= List of Pakistan Tehreek-e-Insaf elected members (2013–2018) =

A list of Pakistan Tehreek-e-Insaf members elected to various national and provincial assemblies in the election 2013.

== Azad Kashmir Assembly ==
Sardar Imtiaz Khan

== National Assembly ==
List of elected Members of the National Assembly from Pakistan Tehreek-e-Insaf.

Name	National Assembly Constituency
Hamid-ul-Haq Khalil	NA-2 Peshawar-II
Sajid Nawaz	NA-3 Peshawar-III
Gulzar Khan	NA-4 Peshawar-IV
Imran Khattak	NA-5 Nowshera-I
Siraj Muhammad Khan	NA-6 Nowshera-II
Ali Muhammad Khan	NA-10 Mardan-II
Mujahid Ali	NA-11 Mardan-III
(Aqib ullah khan) NA-13 swabi II
Shehryar Khan Afridi	NA-14 Kohat
Nasir Khan Khattak	NA-15 Karak
Khial Zaman Aurak Zai	NA-16 Hangu
Dr. Muhammad Azhar Jadoon	NA-17 Abbottabad-I
Dawar Khan Kundi	NA-25 DI Khan-cum-Tank
Col (r) Aminullah Marwat	NA-27 Lakki Marwat
Murad Saeed	NA-29 Swat I
Salim Rehman	NA-30 Swat-II
Junaid Akbar	NA-35 Malakand
Qaiser Jamal	NA-47 Tribal Area-XII
Asad Umar	NA-48 Islamabad
Ghulam Sarwar Khan	NA-53 Rawalpindi-IV
Imran Khan	NA-56 Rawalpindi-VII
Amjid Ali Khan	NA-72 Mianwali-II
Shafqat Mahmood	NA-126 Lahore-IX
Shah Mahmood Qureshi	NA-150 Multan-III
Dr. Arif Alvi	NA-247 Karachi-XII
Attah Ulla NA-250	Karachi West-3
Munaza Hassan	Reserved / Women
Mussarat Ahmed Zeb	Reserved / Women
Ayesha Gulalai	Reserved / Women
Dr. Shireen Mazari	Reserved / Women
Sajida Begum	Reserved / Women
Lal Chand Malhi	Reserved / Minorities

== Khyber Pakhtunkhwa Assembly ==
List of elected Members of the Khyber Pakhtunkhwa Assembly from Pakistan Tehreek-e-Insaf.

Name	KPK Assembly Constituency
Ziaullah Afridi	PK-1 Peshawar-I (Suspended)
Shaukat Ali Yousafzai	PK-2 Peshawar-II (Suspended)
Javed Nasim	PK-3 Peshawar-III (Suspended)
Arif Yousaf	PK-4 Peshawar-IV
Yaseen Khan Khalil	PK-5 Peshawar-V
Fazal Elahi	PK-6 Peshawar-VI (Suspended)
Mehmood Jan	PK-7 Peshawar-VII
Arbab Jahandad Khan	PK-9 Peshawar-IX (Suspended)
Shah Farman	PK-10 Peshawar-X
Syed Muhammad Ishtiaq	PK-11 Peshawar-XI (Suspended)
Khaliq-ur-Rehman	PK-12 Nowshera-I (Suspended)
Pervaiz Khattak	PK-13 Nowshera-II
Jamshaid ud Din	PK-14 Nowshera-III
Muhammad Idrees	PK-15 Nowshera-IV
Qurban Ali Khan (politician)	PK-16 Nowshera-V (Suspended)
Mohammad Arif	PK-22 Charsadda-VI
Muhammad Zahid Durrani	PK-24 Mardan-II (Suspended)
Ubaid Ullah Mayar	PK-25 Mardan-III (Suspended)
Iftikhar Ali Mushwani	PK-26 Mardan-IV
Tufail Anjum	PK-29 Mardan-VII
Muhammad Atif	PK-30 Mardan-VIII
Asad Qaiser	PK-35 Swabi-V
Amjad Khan Afridi	PK-37 Kohat-I (Suspended)
Zia Ullah Khan Bangash	PK-38 Kohat-II
Imtiaz Shahid	PK-39 Kohat-III
Gul Sahib Khan	PK-40 Karak-I (Suspended)
Malik Qasim Khan Khattak	PK-41 Karak-II
Mushtaq Ahmed Ghani	PK-44 Abbottabad-I
Qalandar Khan Lodhi	PK-46 Abbottabad-III
Sardar Muhammad Idrees	PK-48 Abbottabad-V (Suspended)
Yousaf Ayub Khan	PK-50 Haripur-II
Faisal Zaman	PK-52 Haripur-IV
Abdul Haq Khan	PK-61 Kohistan-I
Ali Amin Khan	PK-64 D.I. Khan-I
Sami Ullah	PK-65 D.I. KHAN-II
Israr Ullah Khan Gandapur	PK-67 D.I. KHAN-IV
Shah Muhammad Khan	PK-72 Bannu-III
Fazal Hakim	PK-80 Swat-I (Suspended)
Azizullah Khan	PK-81 Swat-II
Amjad Ali	PK-82 Swat-III
Muhibullah Khan	PK-83 Swat-IV
Mehmood Khan	PK-84 Swat-V
Shakeel Ahmad	PK-99 Malakand
Naseem Hayat	Reserved Seat – Women-1
Zareen Riaz	Reserved Seat – Women-1
Meher Taj Roghani	Reserved Seat – Women-2
Nadia Sher	Reserved Seat – Women-3
Aisha Naeem	Reserved Seat – Women-4
Maliha Tanveer	Reserved Seat – Women-5 (Suspended)
Nargis Ali	Reserved Seat – Women-7
Nagina Khan	Reserved Seat – Women-8
Dina Naz	Reserved Seat – Women-9
Bibi Fozia	Reserved Seat – Women-10
Soran Singh	Reserved Seat – Minorities-1

== Punjab Assembly ==
List of elected Members of the Punjab Assembly from Pakistan Tehreek-e-Insaf.

Name	Punjab Assembly Constituency
Muhammad Siddique Khan	PP-7 Rawalpindi-VII
Malik Taimoor Masood	PP-8 Rawalpindi-VIII
Asif Mehmood	PP-9 Rawalpindi-IX
Raja Rashid Hafeez	PP-11 Rawalpindi-XI
Ijaz Khan	PP-12 Rawalpindi-XII
Muhammad Arif Abbasi	PP-13 Rawalpindi-XIII
Syed Ejaz Hussain Bukhari	PP-15 Attock-I
Salah ud Din Khan	PP-44 Mianwali-II
Ahmed Khan Bhachar	PP-45 Mianwali-III
Muhammad Sibtain Khan	PP-46 Mianwali-IV
Khurram Shehzad	PP-72 Faisalabad-XXII
Nighat Intasar Bhatti	PP-107 Hafiazbad-III
Muhammad Shoaib Siddiqui	PP-147 Lahore-XI
Mian Muhammad Aslam Iqbal	PP-148 Lahore-XII
Mian Mehmood-ur-Rasheed	PP-151 Lahore-XV
Murad Rass	PP-152 Lahore-XVI
Masood Shafqat	PP-189 Okara-V
Zaheer ud Din Khan Alizai	PP-194 Multan-I
Javed Akhtar	PP-195 Multan-II
Waheed Asghar Dogar	PP-224 Sahiwal-V
Muhammad Jahanzaib Khan Khichi	PP-239 Vehari-VIII
Ahmad Ali Khan Dreshak	PP-243 Dera Ghazi Khan-IV
Sardar Ali Raza Khan Dreshak	PP-247 Rajanpur-I
Abdul Majeed Khan Niazi	PP-262 Layyah-I
Mian Mumtaz Ahmad Maharwi	PP-280 Bahawanagar-IV
Sardar Muhammad Saif-ud-Din Khan Khosa	PP-288 Dera Ghazi Khan-IV
Saadia Sohail Rana	Reserved Seat – Women-355
Nausheen Hamid	Reserved Seat – Women-356
Raheela Anwar	Reserved Seat – Women-357
Nabela Hakim Ali Khan	Reserved Seat – Women-358
Naheed Naeem	Reserved Seat – Women-359
Shunila Ruth	Reserved Seat – Minorities-371
Bashir Khan	Reserved Seat – Minorities-219

== Sindh Assembly ==
List of elected Members of the Sindh Assembly from Pakistan Tehreek-e-Insaf.

Name	Sindh Assembly Constituency
Syed Hafeezuddin	PS-93 Karachi-V
Khurrum Sher Zaman	PS-112 Karachi-XXIV
Samar Ali Khan	PS-113 Karachi-XXV
Seema Zia	Reserved Seat – Women-159
