= List of members of the Provincial Assembly of Khyber Pakhtunkhwa (2013–2018) =

Member	Party	Ref
Mehmood Khan (politician)	Pakistan Tehreek-e-Insaf	
Muhammad Ali Shah (politician)	Pakistan Peoples Party	
Muhammad Zahid Durrani	Pakistan Tehreek-e-Insaf	
Muhibullah Khan	Pakistan Tehreek-e-Insaf	
Munawar Khan Advocate	Jamiat Ulema-e Islam (F)	
Qurban Ali Khan (politician)	Pakistan Tehreek-e-Insaf	
Raja Faisal Zaman	Pakistan Muslim League (N)	
Saeed Gul	Jamaat-e-Islami Pakistan	
Sahibzada Sanaullah	Pakistan Peoples Party	
Saleem Khan (politician)	Pakistan Peoples Party	
Saleh Muhammad Khan	Pakistan Muslim League (N)	
Sami Ulllah	Pakistan Tehreek-e-Insaf	
Sardar Aurangzeb Nalota	Pakistan Muslim League (N)	
Sardar Fareed	Pakistan Muslim League (N)	
Sardar Hussain	Pakistan Peoples Party	
Sardar Muhammad Idrees	Pakistan Tehreek-e-Insaf	
Sardar Zahoor Ahmad	Pakistan Muslim League (N)	
Shah Faisal Khan	Independent	
Shah Hussain Khan	Jamiat Ulema-e Islam (F)	
Sikandar Hayat Khan (Pakistani politician)	Qaumi Watan Party	
Sultan Mohammad Khan (politician)	Qaumi Watan Party	
Tufail Anjum	Pakistan Tehreek-e-Insaf	
Ubaid Ullah Mayar	Pakistan Tehreek-e-Insaf	
Yaseen Khan Khalil	Pakistan Tehreek-e-Insaf	
Zar Gul Khan	Pakistan Tehreek-e-Insaf	
Zareen Gul	Jamiat Ulema-e Islam (F)	
Zia Ullah Khan Bangash	Pakistan Tehreek-e-Insaf	
Ziaullah Khan	Pakistan Tehreek-e-Insaf	
