= Constituency WR-07 =

Reserved seat in a Pakistani provincial assembly

- Constituency for the Khyber Pakhtunkhwa Assembly

Current constituency
- Member: Nargis

Constituency WR-07 is a reserved seat for women in the Khyber Pakhtunkhwa Assembly.

== 2013 ==
- Nargis Ali

== See also ==
- Constituency PK-44 (Abbottabad-I)
- Constituency PK-45 (Abbottabad-II)
- Constituency PK-46 (Abbottabad-III)
- Constituency PK-47 (Abbottabad-IV)
- Constituency PK-48 (Abbottabad-V)
- Constituency WR-15
