= Taimur Khan Jhagra =

Pakistani politician

Taimur Saleem Khan Jhagra
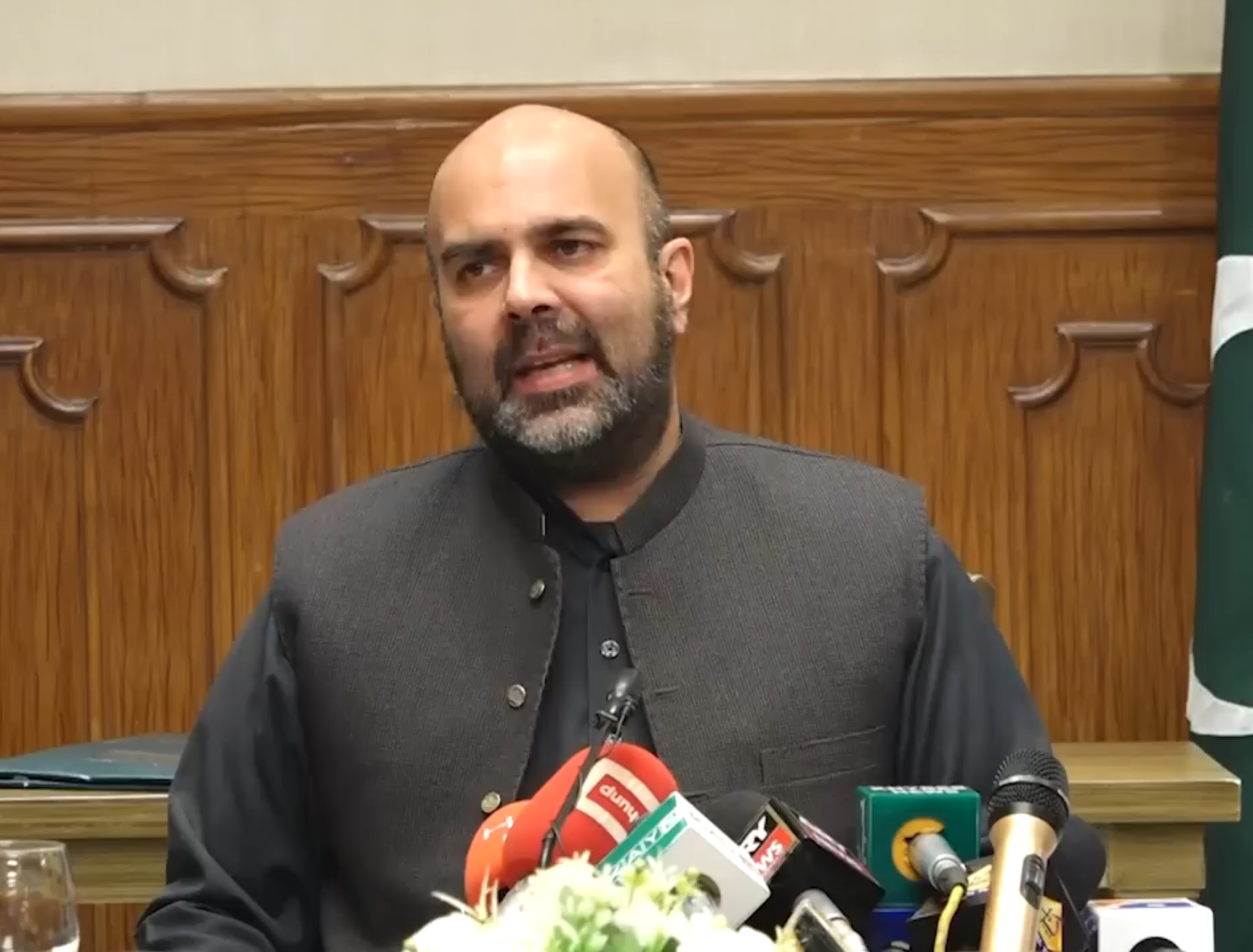

Provincial Minister of Khyber Pakhtunkhwa for Finance
- In office 29 August 2018 – 18 January 2023
- Chief Minister: Mahmood Khan
- Preceded by: Muzafar Said

Provincial Minister of Khyber Pakhtunkhwa for Health
- In office 5 February 2020 – 18 January 2023
- Preceded by: Shahram Khan

Member of the Provincial Assembly of Khyber Pakhtunkhwa
- In office 13 August 2018 – 18 January 2023
- Constituency: PK-73 (Peshawar-VIII)

Personal details
- Born: 9 November 1977 (age 49) Peshawar, Khyber Pakhtunkhwa, Pakistan
- Party: PTI (2018-present)
- Relatives: Ghulam Ishaq Khan (grandfather); Mohammad Ibrahim Khan Jhagra (grandfather); Iftikhar Khan Jhagra (uncle)
- Education: London Business School (MBA); Ghulam Ishaq Khan Institute of Engineering Sciences and Technology (B.S)

Taimur Saleem Khan Jhagra (born 9 November 1977) is a Pakistani politician who was the Provincial Minister of Khyber Pakhtunkhwa for Finance and Health, in office from 29 August 2018 to 18 January 2023. He was a member of the Provincial Assembly of Khyber Pakhtunkhwa from August 2018 to January 2023.

== Early life and education ==
Jhagra was born on 9 November 1977 in Peshawar, Khyber Pakhtunkhwa, Pakistan in a Jhagra , Muslim Khatri family. He is the son of retired federal secretary Mohammad Saleem Khan Jhagra, nephew of late PPP leader and provincial minister Iftikhar Jhagra and grandson of two influential personalities hailing from the province; Mohammad Ibrahim Khan Jhagra, who was a leading figure in the Pakistan movement, and one of the most respected political personalities in the then North West Frontier Province (NWFP); and of Ghulam Ishaq Khan, the influential bureaucrat who served as President of Pakistan between 1988 and 1993.

Jhagra received his primary education in Peshawar, at the PAF (Pakistan Air Force) Degree College School, and his secondary education at The New School Rome, Italy. After completing his pre-engineering studies, also from the PAF Degree College Peshawar, Jhagra graduated with a Bachelor of Science degree in Mechanical Engineering from the Ghulam Ishaq Khan Institute of Engineering Sciences and Technology followed by an MBA (Master of Business Administration) from the London Business School in 2008.

== Political career ==
Jhagra began his political career after quitting his job as partner at McKinsey & Company.

In January 2018, he joined Pakistan Tehreek-e-Insaf (PTI). Following which he was allocated PTI ticket to contest the 2018 general election from Constituency PK-73 (Peshawar-VIII) despite stiff opposition from within PTI. It was noted that at-least 33 PTI workers had applied for a ticket for Constituency PK-73 (Peshawar-VIII) many of which were locals but PTI decided to allocate the ticket to Jhagra, who is relatively unknown in the constituency.

He was elected to the Provincial Assembly of Khyber Pakhtunkhwa as a candidate of PTI from Constituency PK-73 (Peshawar-VIII) in the 2018 general election. He received 15,449 votes and defeated Aman Ullah, a candidate of Muttahida Majlis-e-Amal.

On 29 August 2018, he was inducted into the Khyber Pakhtunkhwa provincial cabinet of Chief Minister Mahmood Khan and was appointed as Provincial Minister of Khyber Pakhtunkhwa for Finance.

On February 5, 2020, he was also given the additional portfolio of Health.

His reforms in the health and finance sectors have been noted for their scope, and have been credited with making Khyber Pakhtunkhwa a leading province for reform in Pakistan.

== Other work ==
=== Lectures and public talks ===
Jhagra has spoken at numerous academic and policy forums, both in Pakistan and internationally:

Pakistan Institute of Development Economics (PIDE) – He has participated in webinars and conferences on economic reform and provincial governance.

Johns Hopkins Bloomberg School of Public Health – Jhagra presented a case study on health policy reform in low- and middle-income countries, based on the Khyber Pakhtunkhwa experience.

== Writings ==
Jhagra has written and spoken extensively on public policy, economic reform, and healthcare governance. His commentary has appeared in both national and international forums.

=== Selected writings ===
Profit by Pakistan Today – He has written regularly on economic issues, fiscal management, and institutional reform.

The News International – Jhagra's columns in this newspaper have addressed themes such as health policy, education, and governance in Khyber Pakhtunkhwa.

Pakistan Institute of Development Economics (PIDE) – He has contributed lectures and policy commentary on reform and development issues through this Islamabad-based think tank.
