= Constituency PK-48 (Abbottabad-V) =

- Former constituency for the Khyber Pakhtunkhwa Assembly

Former constituency
- Abolished: 2018

Constituency PK-48 (Abbottabad-V) is a constituency for the Khyber Pakhtunkhwa Assembly of the Khyber Pakhtunkhwa province of Pakistan.

== See also ==
- Constituency PK-44 (Abbottabad-I)
- Constituency PK-45 (Abbottabad-II)
- Constituency PK-46 (Abbottabad-III)
- Constituency PK-47 (Abbottabad-IV)
- Constituency WR-07
- Constituency WR-15
