= Constituency WR-13 =

Reserved seat in a Pakistani provincial assembly

- Constituency for the Khyber Pakhtunkhwa Assembly

Current constituency
- Member: Najma Shaheen

Constituency WR-13 is a reserved seat for women in the Khyber Pakhtunkhwa Assembly.

== 2013 ==
- Najma Shaheen

== See also ==
- Constituency PK-37 (Kohat-I)
- Constituency PK-38 (Kohat-II)
- Constituency PK-39 (Kohat-III)
- Constituency WR-09
