= Shafi Ullah Jan =

Pakistani politician

Provincial Minister for Information and Public Relations of Khyber Pakhtunkhwa
- Incumbent
- Assumed office 21 May 2026
- Constituency: PK-92 Kohat-III

Member of the Provincial Assembly of Khyber Pakhtunkhwa
- Incumbent
- Assumed office 29 February 2024

Personal details
- Born: 3 April 1989 (age 37) Kohat District, Khyber Pakhtunkhwa, Pakistan
- Citizenship: Pakistani
- Party: PTI (2015–present)
- Education: Bahria University (MBA)
- Occupation: Politician, Businessman

Shafi Ullah Jan (Urdu: شفيع الله جان; born 3 April 1989) is a Pakistani politician and businessman from Kohat District who is currently serving as the Provincial Minister for Information and Public Relations of Khyber Pakhtunkhwa. He has been a member of the Provincial Assembly of Khyber Pakhtunkhwa since February 2024.

== Early life and education ==
Jan was born on 3 April 1989 in Kohat District, Khyber Pakhtunkhwa. He completed his Master of Business Administration (MBA) in Marketing from Bahria University, Islamabad in 2013.

== Political career ==
Jan began his involvement in local politics in 2015. He contested the local government elections for District Mayor in 2021.

He was elected to the Provincial Assembly of Khyber Pakhtunkhwa for the first time in the 2024 general election from the PK-92 Kohat-III constituency as a Pakistan Tehreek-e-Insaf-backed independent candidate. He secured 42,254 votes, defeating runner-up Zia Ullah Khan Bangash of PTI-P.

Following the formation of the provincial government led by Chief Minister Sohail Afridi, Jan served as the Special Assistant to the Chief Minister for Information and Public Relations. During a cabinet expansion in May 2026, he was elevated to full cabinet rank and sworn in as the Provincial Minister for Information and Public Relations of Khyber Pakhtunkhwa.

== Personal life ==
He is married.

== Career ==
He contested the 2024 general elections as a Pakistan Tehreek-e-Insaf/Independent candidate from PK-92 Kohat-III. He secured 42,254 votes. The runner-up was Zia Ullah Khan Bangash of Pakistan Tehreek-e-Insaf Parliamentarians who secured 13,609 votes.
