= Muhammad Khurshid =

Pakistani politician

Member of the Provincial Assembly of Khyber Pakhtunkhwa
- Incumbent
- Assumed office 29 February 2024
- Constituency: PK-97 Karak-I

Personal details
- Born: Karak District, Khyber Pakhtunkhwa, Pakistan
- Political party: PTI (2024-present)

Muhammad Khurshid is a Pakistani politician from Karak District. He is currently serving as a member of the Provincial Assembly of Khyber Pakhtunkhwa since February 2024.

== Career ==
He contested the 2024 general elections as a Pakistan Tehreek-e-Insaf/Independent candidate from PK-97 Karak-I. He secured 51994 votes. While his runner-up was Nisar Gul of JUI-F who secured 21387 votes.
