= Constituency WR-09 =

Reserved seat in a Pakistani provincial assembly

- Constituency for the Khyber Pakhtunkhwa Assembly
- Region: Kohat District

Current constituency
- Member: Dina Naz

Constituency WR-09 is a reserved seat for women in the Khyber Pakhtunkhwa Assembly.

== See also ==
- Constituency PK-37 (Kohat-I)
- Constituency PK-38 (Kohat-II)
- Constituency PK-39 (Kohat-III)
- Constituency WR-13
