= PK-79 Peshawar-VIII =

Pakistani electoral district

- Constituency for the Khyber Pakhtunkhwa Assembly
- Region: Peshawar City area of Peshawar District

Current constituency
- Party: Pakistan Tehreek-e-Insaf
- Member: Taimur Saleem Khan Jhagra (Finance Minister)
- Created from: PK-05 Peshawar-V (before 2018) PK-73 Peshawar-VIII (2018-2022)

PK-79 Peshawar-VIII (پی کے-79 پشاور-8) is a constituency for the Khyber Pakhtunkhwa Assembly of the Khyber Pakhtunkhwa province of Pakistan.

== Elections 2013 ==
Contesting candidates	Party affiliation	Votes polled
Yaseen Khan Khalil	Pakistan Tehreek-E-Insaf	31575
Maulana Amanullah Haqqani	Jamiat Ulama-E-Islam (F)	6908
Muhammad Ibrar	Qaumi Watan Party (Sherpao)	4140
Farhad Ali	Pakistan Muslim League (N)	3228
Ateef Ur Rehman	Independents	3133
Mian Anwar Said Bacha	Jamaat Ahle Hadith Pakistan (Ropri)	2854
Dr.Arbab Alamgir Khan	Pakistan Peoples Party Parliamentarians	2555
Al Haaj Noor Wali Khalil	Mutahida Deeni Mahaz	1882
Arbab Muhammad Tahir Khan Khali	Awami National Party	1620

== See also ==
- PK-78 Peshawar-VII
- PK-80 Peshawar-IX
