= PK-91 Kohat-IV =

Pakistani electoral district

- Constituency for the Khyber Pakhtunkhwa Assembly
- Region: Kohat city area of Kohat District

Current constituency
- Created: 2022
- Party: TBD
- Member: TBD
- Created from: PK-37 Kohat-I and PK-38 Kohat-II

PK-91 Kohat-IV (پی کے-91 کوہاٹ-4) is a constituency for the Khyber Pakhtunkhwa Assembly of the Khyber Pakhtunkhwa province of Pakistan.It was created after 2022 delimitations.

== See also ==
- PK-90 Kohat-III
- PK-92 Hangu-I
