= Muhammad Azam Khan (civil servant) =

Pakistani civil servant (1933–2023)

Chief Minister of Khyber Pakhtunkhwa
- Caretaker
- In office 21 January 2023 – 11 November 2023
- Governor: Haji Ghulam Ali
- Preceded by: Mahmood Khan
- Succeeded by: Arshad Hussain Shah

Federal Minister
- In office 5 June 2018 – 13 August 2018
- Prime Minister: Nasirul Mulk
- Departments: Interior, Inter-Provincial Coordination, Narcotics Control, Capital Administration and Development, Housing and Works
- Preceded by: Ahsan Iqbal
- Succeeded by: Imran Khan

Minister of Finance Planning and Development, Khyber Pakhtunkhwa
- In office 24 October 2007 – 1 April 2008
- Chief Minister: Shamsul Mulk

Chief Secretary of North-West Frontier Province
- In office September 1990 – July 1993
- Governor: Amir Gulistan Janjua
- Chief Minister: Mir Afzal Khan

Personal details
- Born: 1933 Prang, Charsadda, North-West Frontier Province, British India (present-day Khyber Pakhtunkhwa, Pakistan)
- Died: 11 November 2023 (aged 89) Peshawar, Khyber Pakhtunkhwa, Pakistan
- Education: University of Peshawar; Burn Hall College
- Occupation: Civil servant

Muhammad Azam Khan (Urdu: محمد اعظم خان; 1933 – 11 November 2023) was a Pakistani civil servant who served as the caretaker Chief Minister of Khyber Pakhtunkhwa from 21 January 2023 until his death on 11 November 2023.

== Early life ==
Muhammad Azam Khan was born in a village named Parrang in Charsadda. He had a law degree from the University of Peshawar. In addition, Muhammad Azam Khan passed Bar At Law from Lincoln's Inn College London. He joined District Management Group after passing Civil Service Examination, who retired from the top slot of Chief Secretary, Khyber Pukhtunkhwa in 1993.

The family background of Muhammad Azam Khan is most familiar in the socio-political circles hailing from the inter-provincial bordering territory of Punjab and Khyber Pakhtunkhwa. He was the brother of former Inspector General Police (Tenure: 1985-1988), former caretaker Provincial Minister Abbas Khan (Late). Azam Khan was cousin of Chairman Quomi Watan Party Aftab Ahmed Khan Sherpao. Azam Khan was son-in-law of PML (N)'s former MPA Attock Taj Mohammad Khanzada (Late) who was uncle of PML (N) former Provincial Interior Minister Punjab Col (R) Shujah Khanzada (Late). One of his brother-in-law was former Commissioner Khalid Khan (Late) who was brother of former Inspector General Motorway Police (Tenure: 2011-2012) Zufarullah Khan (Late). Such as Khalid Khan and Zafrullah Khan were cousins of former Inspector General Police KPK (Tenure: 2019-2020) Dr Naeem Khan while former Inspector General Frontier Constabulary (Tenure: 2005-2006) Sikandar Mohammad Zai (Late) was also the cousin of Khalid Khan and Zafrullah Khan. Sikandar's son former senator Adnan Khan (Tenure: 2009-2015) is son in law of PTI’s former Chief Minister KPK Pervez Khattak.

== Later career ==
Khan served as the provincial Minister for Finance from 24 October 2007 to 1 April 2008. He was also the secretary of the Ministry of Petroleum and Natural Resources in Islamabad and the Chief Secretary of Khyber Pakhtunkhwa from September 1990 to July 1993.

Muhammad Azam Khan served as the caretaker Chief Minister of Khyber Pakhtunkhwa from 21 January 2023 until his death on 11 November 2023. He was appointed by Governor Haji Ghulam Ali after the dissolution of the Provincial Assembly of Khyber Pakhtunkhwa on 18 January 2023.

== Death ==
After being admitted into an intensive care unit due to feeling unwell the night before, he died at the Rehman Medical Institute on 11 November 2023. He was 89.

Political offices
Preceded by Mahmood Khan	Chief Minister of Khyber Pakhtunkhwa (Caretaker); 21 January 2023 – 11 November 2023	Succeeded by Arshad Hussain Shah
