= Karak Tehsil =

Karak Tehsil تحصیل کرک کرک تحصیل
- Tehsil
- Country: Pakistan
- Region: Khyber Pakhtunkhwa
- District: Karak

Government
  - Chairman: Azmat Ali Khan (PTI)

Population (2017)
  - Tehsil: 293,520
  - Urban: 51,149
  - Rural: 242,371
- Time zone: UTC+5 (PST)
  - Summer (DST): UTC+6 (PDT)

Karak is a tehsil located in Karak District, Khyber Pakhtunkhwa, Pakistan. The population is 339,983 according to the 2023 census. The district HQ is located in this tehsil.It is the administrative capital of the district. It is boasting majority of government offices like Deputy Commissioner, District Accounts Officer, District Police officers etc along with key health facilities like DHQ hospital and Judicial Complex. Furthermore it is home to the only university in the district along with Government Postgraduate college.Most of its population is rural and the most developed tehsil in the district.

== Administrations ==
Karak Tehsil is the administrative capital of Karak District and is divided in to 22 village or neighbourhood councils:

- NC official Colony
- NC College town
- NC Mithawala
- NC Tappi Karak
- VC Rehmat Abad
- VC Jandri
- Sarat Khel
- Tarkha Koi
- Dhoda Khel
- Dhand Idal Khel
- Sabir Abad
- Deli Mela
- Palosa Sar
- Chani Khel
- Ghundi Mirkhan Khel
- Tarki Khel
- Esak Chontra
- Kando Khel
- Mithakhel
- Lakki Ghundaki
- Kanda Karak
- Mandawa
- Latambar Sharqi
- Latambar Gharbi
- Surdog
- Warrana Latamabar

== Mouzas ==
The tehsil comprises 53 mouzas in 17 patwar halqas.

== Patwar halqas ==
There are 17 patwar halqa's in Karak tehsil:

- Latambar
- Tappi Karak
- Karak
- Kanda Karak
- Lakki Ghundaki
- Mitha Khel
- Tarkha Koi
- Esak Chontra
- Jandri
- Kabir Kalla
- Ghundi MirKhan Khel
- Shamshaki
- Kando Khel
- Chani Khel
- Deli Mela
- Dhand Edal Khel
- Talab Khel

There are three Qanungoi circles (QC):

- QC Latambar
- QC Karak
- QC Sabir Abad

== Education ==
Major educational institutions include the following:

- Khushal khan Khattak University
- Government Postgraduate College karak
- Government Girls Degree College KDA Karak
- Government Degree College Sabir Abad
- Government Girls Degree College Sabir Abad

== Judiciary ==
A joint judicial complex of Karak Tehsil and Takht-e-Nasrati Tehsil was constructed near Jail Chowk. It became operational in September 2025.

== Transportation ==
The N55 Indus Highway passes through Karak tehsil and is the main source of transportation. the tehsil also has Bannu Road, which passes through Karak city, Preshan Khattak Road, which links Sabir Abad to Indus highway, Palosa Sar Road, Dagar Nari Road and many more.

== Health ==
Karak tehsil is home to the largest hospitals in the district:

- District Headquarters Hospital KDA Karak
- Type D Hospital Karak

== Markets, bazaars ==
Karak Tehsil is the also the commercial capital of Karak District , with the following markets:

- Karak City Market - the largest in the district
- Mithakhel Bazar
- Niazi culvert Stop Market
- Tangorhi Chowk Market
- Jail chowk Market
- Rehmat Abad Market
- Latambar Bazar

== Notable people ==
- Pareshan Khattak
- Gul Sahib Khan
- Muhammad Khurshid
- Masood Sharif Khan Khattak

== See also ==
- List of tehsils of Khyber Pakhtunkhwa
