= Iqbal Zafar Jhagra =

Pakistani politician

- اقبال ظفر جھگڑا

32nd Governor of Khyber Pakhtunkhwa
- In office 4 March 2016 – 20 August 2018
- President: Mamnoon Hussain
- Prime Minister: Nawaz Sharif; Shahid Khaqan Abbasi
- Chief Minister: Parvez Khattak
- Preceded by: Sardar Mehtab Abbasi
- Succeeded by: Mushtaq Ahmed Ghani (Acting)

Pakistani Senator from Islamabad Capital Territory
- In office March 1997, – October 1999, March 2009
- Constituency: Islamabad Capital Territory
- In office March 2008 – March 2009

Secretary-General of Pakistan Muslim League (N)
- President: Nawaz Sharif

Personal details
- Born: Iqbal Zafar Jhagra; 17 May 1947 (age 79) Peshawar, British Raj
- Party: Pakistan Muslim League (N)
- Spouse: 1
- Relations: Iftikhar Khan Jhagra (cousin)
- Children: 4
- Education: Peshawar University Engineering College; Bachelor's degree in Civil engineering
- Occupation: Politician
- Profession: Engineer
- Cabinet: Secretary-General of PML (N)
- Committees: Chairman Senate Standing Committee for Defence, production and Aviation and Special Assistant to Prime Minister Nawaz Sharif from 1997 to Oct 1999
- Website: Profile

Iqbal Zafar Jhagra (Urdu: اقبال ظفر جھگڑا) (born 17 May 1947) is a Pakistani politician who served as the 28th Governor of Khyber Pakhtunkhwa. Previously, he served as a Senator as well as Secretary-General of the Pakistan Muslim League (N).

== Personal life ==
Jhagra was born on 17 May 1947 in Peshawar.

Political offices
| Preceded by Mehtab Abbasi | Governor of Khyber Pakhtunkhwa; 4 March 2016 - 20 August 2018 | Succeeded by Shah Farman |
