= Khyber Pakhtunkhwa Information Technology Board =

Department of government of Khyber Pakhtunkhwa

Agency overview
- Formed: May 2011; 15 years ago
- Jurisdiction: Government of Khyber Pakhtunkhwa
- Headquarters: Peshawar, Khyber Pakhtunkhwa, Pakistan; 33.9846723°N 71.4298603°E
- Minister responsible: Atif Khan
- Website: Official Website

Khyber Pakhtunkhwa Information Technology Board or KPITB is a public sector autonomous organization of the Khyber Pakhtunkhwa government established in May 2011.
