= Iftikhar Khan Jhagra =

Pakistani politician

Iftikhar Khan Jhagra MPA

Member of the Khyber Pakhtunkhwa Assembly

Personal details
- Relations: Mohammad Ibrahim Khan Jhagra (father); Iqbal Zafar Jhagra (cousin)

Iftikhar Khan Jhagra (died 2017) was a Pakistani politician and former provincial minister who served as a member of the Khyber Pakhtunkhwa Assembly.
