= Qalandar Khan Lodhi =

Pakistani politician

Provincial Minister of Khyber Pakhtunkhwa for Food
- In office 30 August 2018 – 2 June 2021
- Chief Minister: Mahmood Khan

Member of the Provincial Assembly of Khyber Pakhtunkhwa
- In office 31 May 2013 – 28 May 2018
- Constituency: PK-38 (Abbottabad-III)
- In office 2008–2013
- Constituency: PK-46 Abbottabad-III
- In office 2002–2008
- Constituency: PK-46 Abbottabad-III

Personal details
- Born: 19 March 1944 (age 82) Abbottabad, Abbottabad District
- Party: Pakistan Tehreek-e-Insaf (PTI)
- Occupation: Politician

Qalandar Khan Lodhi (Urdu: قلندر خان لودھی; born 19 March 1944) is a Pakistani politician hailing from Abbottabad District who served as Minister for Food in the 10th Khyber Pakhtunkhwa Assembly.

== Political career ==
He is also served as two times member of Khyber Pakhtunkhwa Assembly from 2002 to 2008 and 2008–2013 as independent and later join Pakistan Muslim League (Q), again in the 2013 election elected as independent and later joining Pakistan Tehreek-e-Insaf.

He was elected to PK-38 Abbottabad seat in the 2018 General Election on the ticket of Pakistan Tehreek-e-Insaf. He is advisor to Chief Minister on food since 2 June 2021.
