= Salahuddin Khan =

Pakistani politician

Member of the Provincial Assembly of Khyber Pakhtunkhwa
- In office 29 October 2018 – 18 January 2023
- Preceded by: Shah Farman
- Constituency: PK-71 (Peshawar-VI)

Personal details
- Party: TLP (2025-present)
- Other political affiliations: ANP (2018-2025)

Salahuddin Khan is a Pakistani politician who was a member of the Provincial Assembly of Khyber Pakhtunkhwa from October 2018 to January 2023.

== Political career ==
Khan was elected to the Provincial Assembly of Khyber Pakhtunkhwa from the constituency PK-71 as a candidate of Awami National Party in by-elections held on 21 October 2018. The seat was vacated by Pakistan Tehreek-e-Insaf (PTI)'s Shah Farman due to him being appointed as governor of Khyber Pakhtunkhwa but PTI could not retain it despite Farman's brother Zulfiqar Khan being their candidate. Salahuddin Khan garnered 11,416 votes while Zulfiqar Khan received 10,004 votes.
