= Arshad Hussain Shah =

Pakistani jurist

Syed Arshad Hussain Shah
- سید ارشد حسین شاہ

Chief Minister of Khyber Pakhtunkhwa
- Caretaker
- In office 12 November 2023 – 2 March 2024
- Governor: Haji Ghulam Ali
- Preceded by: Muhammad Azam Khan
- Succeeded by: Ali Amin Gandapur

Chief Judge of the Supreme Appellate Court Gilgit-Baltistan
- In office 8 May 2019 – May 2022
- Preceded by: Rana Shamim
- Succeeded by: Sardar Muhammad Shamim Khan

Provincial Minister for Law, Auqaf, and Human Rights
- Caretaker
- In office 19 August 2023 – 11 November 2023
- Governor: Haji Ghulam Ali
- Chief Minister: Muhammad Azam Khan

Personal details
- Born: 10 January 1964 (age 62) Abbottabad, Khyber Pakhtunkhwa, Pakistan

Syed Arshad Hussain Shah (Urdu: سید ارشد حسین شاہ) is a Pakistani jurist who is currently serving as a Judge in the Federal Constitutional Court of Pakistan since 14 November 2025. He is the former Caretaker Chief Minister of Khyber Pakhtunkhwa for the 2023 Caretaker Government. Prior to his appointment to the FCCP, Shah served as the Chairman of the Commission of Inquiry and Enforced Disappearances alias Missing Person Commission. He has also served as the Chief Judge of the Supreme Appellate Court Gilgit-Baltistan from 2019 to 2022.

He has also served as the Minister for Law, Auqaf, and Human Rights in the caretaker cabinet of Muhammad Azam Khan.

== Judicial career ==
He was appointed as the Chief Judge of the Supreme Appellate Court Gilgit-Baltistan on 8 May 2019. He served in this role until his retirement in May 2022.

== Later career ==
On 19 August 2023, he was inducted into the provincial cabinet of the Caretaker Chief Minister of Khyber Pakhtunkhwa, Muhammad Azam Khan, and was assigned the portfolios of Law, Auqaf, and Human Rights. He served in this position until the Muhammad Azam Khan's death, after which the cabinet was dissolved.

A day later, on 12 November, he was nominated as the next Caretaker Chief Minister of Khyber Pakhtunkhwa. His name was put forward by Akram Khan Durrani, the former Leader of the Opposition in the Provincial Assembly of Khyber Pakhtunkhwa, and was agreed upon by Mahmood Khan, the former elected Chief Minister. He was soon approved by Governor Haji Ghulam Ali and was then administered oath.

Political offices
Preceded by Muhammad Azam Khan	Chief Minister of Khyber Pakhtunkhwa (Caretaker); 12 November 2023– 2 March 2024	Succeeded by Ali Amin Gandapur
