= Constituency WR-06 =

Reserved seat in a Pakistani provincial assembly

- Constituency for the Khyber Pakhtunkhwa Assembly

Current constituency
- Member: Anwar Hayat Khan

Constituency WR-06 is a reserved seat for women in the Khyber Pakhtunkhwa Assembly.

== 2013 ==
- Zareen Riaz

== See also ==
- Constituency PK-74 (Lakki Marwat-I)
- Constituency PK-75 (Lakki Marwat-II)
- Constituency PK-76 (Lakki Marwat-III)
