= Shah Farman =

Pakistani politician

33rd Governor of Khyber Pakhtunkhwa
- In office 5 September 2018 – 16 April 2022
- President: Mamnoon Hussain; Arif Alvi
- Chief Minister: Mahmood Khan
- Preceded by: Iqbal Zafar Jhagra; Mushtaq Ahmed Ghani (Acting)
- Succeeded by: Haji Ghulam Ali

Minister for Public Health Engineering and Information of Khyber Pakhtunkhwa
- In office 21 July 2014 – 28 May 2018
- Governor: Shaukatullah Khan; Mehtab Ahmed Khan
- Chief Minister: Pervez Khattak
- Preceded by: Mushtaq Ahmed Ghani

Member of the Provincial Assembly of Khyber Pakhtunkhwa
- In office 17 August 2018 – 4 September 2018
- Succeeded by: Salahuddin Khan
- Constituency: PK-71 Peshawar-VI
- In office 31 May 2013 – 28 May 2018
- Constituency: PK 10 Peshawar-X

Personal details
- Born: Badaber, Peshawar District, Khyber Pakhtunkhwa, Pakistan
- Party: PTI (1998–present)
- Education: University of Peshawar

Shah Farman (Urdu: شاہ فرمان, born March 1965) is a Pakistani politician from Pakistan Tehreek-e-Insaf. He served as the 32nd Governor of Khyber Pakhtunkhwa from 5 September 2018 to 16 April 2022. Previously, he was a member of the Khyber Pakhtunkhwa Assembly from May 2013 to May 2018, and again from August 2018 to September 2018.

== Early life and education ==
Farman was born in March 1965 in Badaber, a village located in the Peshawar District of Khyber Pakhtunkhwa, and he has earned his LLB from the Khyber Law College, University of Peshawar.

== Political career ==
Farman has been associated with Pakistan Tehreek-e-Insaf (PTI) since at least 1998.

He had been a member of the Khyber Pakhtunkhwa Assembly from 2013 to 2018. He also served as the minister for public health engineering and information in Pervez Khattak cabinet. He was re-elected to the KPK Assembly as a candidate of PTI from Constituency PK-71 Peshawar-VI in 2018 Pakistani general election. He received 17,309 votes and defeated Sifat Ullah, a candidate of the Pakistan Muslim League (N).

On 16 August 2018, he was nominated for the post of Governor of Khyber Pakhtunkhwa. On 4 September 2018, he resigned from his Khyber Pakhtunkhwa Assembly seat after casting his vote in the 2018 Pakistani presidential election. On 5 September 2018, Farman took oath as Governor of Khyber Pakthunkhwa. On 16 April 2022, his resignation as Khyber Pakhtunkhwa Governor was accepted by President Arif Alvi.

Political offices
Preceded by Iqbal Zafar Jhagra	Governor of Khyber Pakhtunkhwa; 5 September 2018 - 16 April 2022	Succeeded by Haji Ghulam Ali
