= Provincial Minister of Khyber Pakhtunkhwa for Finance =

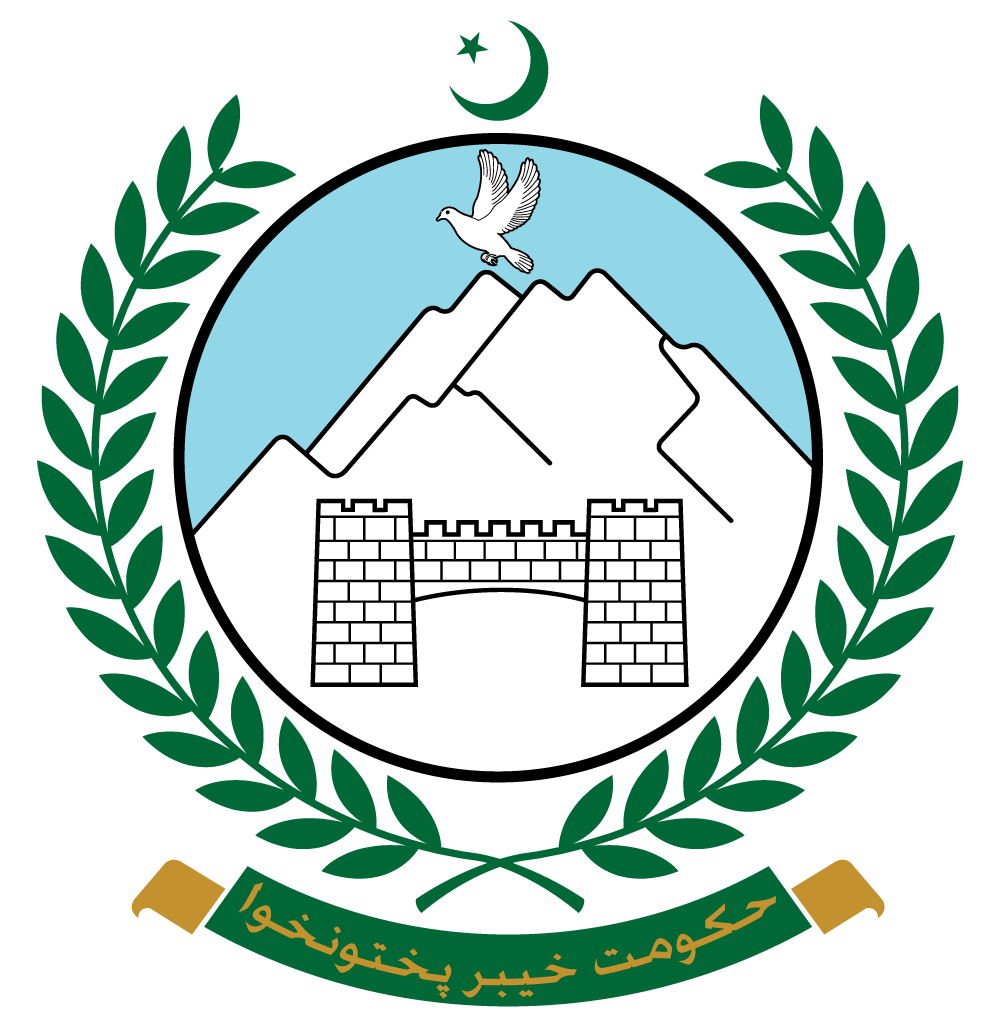
- Incumbent; Muzzammil Aslam since 7 November 2024
- Member of: Provincial Assembly of Khyber Pakhtunkhwa
- Reports to: Chief Minister of Khyber Pakhtunkhwa
- Seat: Peshawar
- Appointer: Chief Minister
- Term length: No term limit
- Website: https://www.finance.gkp.pk/

The Provincial Minister of Khyber Pakhtunkhwa for Finance is the head of the department of Finance in the Pakistani regional Government of Khyber Pakhtunkhwa. The Minister is a member of the Khyber Pakhtunkhwa Chief Minister's Cabinet. Muzzammil Aslam is the current Provincial Minister of Khyber Pakhtunkhwa for Finance, appointed by Chief Minister Ali Amin Gandapur appointed on 7 November 2024.

The last Minister of Finance, Mr. Taimur Saleem Khan Jhagra was appointed by Chief Minister of Khyber Pakhtunkhwa Mahmood Khan on 30 August 2018. The duties of the minister revolve around Finance conditions and concerns in the Khyber Pakhtunkhwa district. This includes advising the Chief Minister on matters of Finance. It strives to administer the department of Finance to carry out approved programs and make the public aware of the objectives of the department.
