= Atif Khan =

Pakistani politician

Provincial Minister of Khyber Pakhtunkhwa for Food
- In office 20 May 2021 – 18 January 2023
- Governor: Shah Farman
- Chief Minister: Mahmood Khan

Provincial Minister of Khyber Pakhtunkhwa for Science and Technology
- In office 20 May 2021 – 18 January 2023
- Governor: Shah Farman
- Chief Minister: Mahmood Khan

Provincial Minister of Khyber Pakhtunkhwa for Information Technology
- In office 20 May 2021 – 18 January 2023
- Governor: Shah Farman
- Chief Minister: Mahmood Khan

Provincial Minister of Khyber Pakhtunkhwa (without portfolio)
- In office 13 April 2021 – 20 May 2021
- Governor: Shah Farman
- Chief Minister: Mahmood Khan

Senior Minister of Khyber Pakhtunkhwa
- In office 29 August 2018 – 26 January 2020
- Governor: Shah Farman
- Chief Minister: Mahmood Khan

Provincial Minister of Khyber Pakhtunkhwa for Tourism, Culture, Sports, Archaeology and Youth Affairs
- In office 29 August 2018 – 26 January 2020
- Chief Minister: Mahmood Khan
- Preceded by: Mahmood Khan

Provincial Minister of Khyber Pakhtunkhwa for Energy and Power
- In office July 2014 – May 2018
- Chief Minister: Pervez Khattak

Provincial Minister of Khyber Pakhtunkhwa for Elementary and Secondary Education
- In office June 2013 – May 2018
- Chief Minister: Pervez Khattak

Member of the Provincial Assembly of Khyber Pakhtunkhwa
- In office 13 August 2018 – 18 January 2023
- Constituency: PK-50 (Mardan-III)
- In office 29 May 2013 – 28 May 2018
- Constituency: PK-30 (Mardan-VIII)

President of PTI Peshawar
- Incumbent
- Assumed office 16 January 2023
- Chairman: Imran Khan; Gohar Ali Khan

Member of the National Assembly of Pakistan
- Incumbent
- Assumed office 29 February 2024
- Constituency: NA-22 Mardan-II

Personal details
- Born: 21 May 1972 (age 54) Mardan, Khyber Pakhtunkhwa, Pakistan
- Party: PTI (2013-present)
- Education: Cadet College Kohat
- Alma mater: University of Peshawar

Muhammad Atif Khan (Urdu: عاطف خان) is a Pakistani politician who was the Provincial Minister of Khyber Pakhtunkhwa for Tourism, Culture, Sports, Archaeology and Youth Affairs, in office from 29 August 2018 till 26 January 2020. He is currently a member of the National Assembly of Pakistan since February 2024. He had been a member of the Provincial Assembly of Khyber Pakhtunkhwa from August 2018 till January 2023.

Previously, he was a member of the Provincial Assembly of Khyber Pakhtunkhwa from May 2013 to May 2018. He served as Provincial Minister of Khyber Pakhtunkhwa for Elementary and Secondary Education from June 2013 to May 2018. He was appointed as Minister for Food and Science and Technology and Information Technology on 20 May 2021.

== Early life and education ==
He was born on 21 May 1972.

He received his matriculation-level education from the Nisar Shaheed College, Risalpur and did intermediate from Cadet College Kohat. He holds an MBA degree.

== Political career ==
He was elected to the Provincial Assembly of Khyber Pakhtunkhwa as a candidate of Pakistan Tehreek-e-Insaf (PTI) from Constituency PK-30 (Mardan-VIII) in the 2013 Pakistani general election. He received 16,985 votes and defeated Azam Khan of PMLN. On 14 June 2013, he was inducted into the provincial Khyber Pakhtunkhwa cabinet of Chief Minister Pervez Khattak and was appointed as Provincial Minister of Khyber Pakhtunkhwa for Elementary and Secondary Education. On 1 July 2014, he was given the additional ministerial portfolio of Energy and Power.

During his tenure as minister for elementary and secondary education, he is credited with introducing a number of reforms (including improvements in curriculum as well as schools infrastructure, increasing enrollment, ensuring teachers attendance and enhancing budget for primary and elementary education) in the Khyber Pakhtunkhwa's education sector. He remained minister for Elementary and Secondary Education till 2018.

He was re-elected to the Provincial Assembly of Khyber Pakhtunkhwa] as a candidate of PTI from Constituency PK-50 (Mardan-III) in the 2018 Pakistani general election. He received 25,807 votes and defeated Haroon Khan, a candidate of Awami National Party (ANP). In the same election, he also ran for the seat of the National Assembly of Pakistan as a candidate of PTI from Constituency NA-21 (Mardan-II) but was unsuccessful. He lost the seat to Ameer Haider Khan Hoti by a narrow margin of 156 votes.

After PTI acquired a two-thirds majority during the general election in the Provincial Assembly of Khyber Pakhtunkhwa Imran Khan preferred Atif Khan for the office of Khyber Pakhtunkhwa Chief Ministership however, had to nominate Mahmood Khan due to strong reservations and grouping within the ranks orchestrated by Pervez Khattak over the former's selection.

On 29 August 2018, he was inducted into the provincial Khyber Pakhtunkhwa cabinet of Chief Minister Mahmood Khan and was appointed as Provincial Minister of Khyber Pakhtunkhwa for Tourism, Culture, Sports, Archaeology and Youth Affairs. He was given the status of a senior minister.

Since taking over his role as minister Atif Khan has revitalized the Khyber Pakhtunkhwa Tourism department and has provided great impetus to the work of sports and Youth affairs that he was partly overseeing in his previous term as minister for Education.
