= Dina Naz =

Pakistani politician

MPA Dina Naz

Parliamentary Secretary in Social Welfare Department to Chief Minister
- In office 4 October 2013 – 28 May 2018

Member of the Khyber Pakhtunkhwa Assembly
- In office 31 May 2013 – 28 May 2018
- Constituency: WR-09

Personal details
- Born: 6 January 1964 (age 62)
- Party: PTI (2013-present)
- Occupation: Politician

Dina Naz is a Pakistani politician from Kohat District, who served as a member of the 10th Khyber Pakhtunkhwa Assembly, belonging to the Pakistan Tehreek-e-Insaf.

== Education ==
Naz earned a Master of Arts degree in Master of Business Administration and human resource management.

== Political career ==
Dina Naz was elected as the member of the Khyber Pakhtunkhwa Assembly on Reserved Seats for Women from Constituency WR-09 in 2013.
