= Najma Shaheen =

Pakistani politician (born 1962)

Najma Shaheen MPA

Member of the Provincial Assembly of Khyber Pakhtunkhwa
- Incumbent
- Assumed office 29 May 2013
- Constituency: Reserved seat for women

Personal details
- Born: 9 February 1962 (age 64) Kohat, Khyber Pakhtunkhwa
- Party: Jamiat Ulema-e Islam (F)

Najma Shaheen (Urdu: نجمہ شاہین; born 9 February 1962) is a Pakistani politician who has been a Member of the Provincial Assembly of Khyber Pakhtunkhwa since May 2013.

== Early life and education ==
Shaheen was born on 9 February 1962 in Kohat, Khyber Pakhtunkhwa.

She has completed intermediate education.

== Political career ==
Shaheen was elected to the Provincial Assembly of Khyber Pakhtunkhwa as a candidate of Jamiat Ulema-e Islam (F) on a reserved seat for women in the 2013 Pakistani general election.

In May 2016, she joined a resolution to establish a Women's Caucus in the Provincial Assembly of Khyber Pakhtunkhwa. She also joined a resolution to declare 8 July as Charity Day in honour of Abdul Sattar Edhi. In December, she joined a resolution to establish a minority Caucus in the Provincial Assembly of Khyber Pakhtunkhwa.
