= Jameel Khan Chamakni =

Pakistani politician

Member-elect of the Provincial Assembly of Khyber Pakhtunkhwa
- Constituency: PK-108 (Kurram-I)

Personal details
- Party: Independent

Jameel Khan Chamakni is a Pakistani politician who is member-elect of the Provincial Assembly of Khyber Pakhtunkhwa.

== Political career ==
Chamakni contested the 2019 Khyber Pakhtunkhwa provincial election on 20 July 2019 from constituency PK-108 (Kurram-I) as an independent. He won the election by the majority of 429 votes over the runner up Muhammad Riaz Bangash of Jamiat Ulema-e-Islam (F). He garnered 8,075 votes while Bangash received 7,646 votes.
