= Hamid Farooq Durrani =

Pakistani Jurist

Chairman of the Khyber Pakhtunkhwa Services Tribunal
- Incumbent
- Assumed office November 2018

Judge at Peshawar High Court
- In office 2009–2017

Hamid Farooq Durrani (born in Pakistan) is a Pakistani jurist and lawyer. He is the current Chairman of the Khyber Pakhtunkhwa Services Tribunal, a position he was appointed to in November 2018. He was formerly a judge of the Peshawar High Court. Durrani was also the Chief Ehtesab Commissioner at Khyber Pakhtunkhwa Ehtesab Commission till his appointment to the tribunal in 2018.
