= Muhammad Idrees (politician) =

Pakistani politician (died 2023)

Sardar Muhammad Idrees

Member of the Provincial Assembly of Khyber Pakhtunkhwa
- In office 29 May 2013 – 28 May 2018
- Constituency: Constituency PK-48 (Abbottabad-V)

Personal details
- Died: 25 March 2023
- Party: PTI (2013-2023)

Sardar Muhammad Idrees (Urdu: سردار محمد ادریس; died 25 March 2023) was a Pakistani politician who served as a member of the Provincial Assembly of Khyber Pakhtunkhwa from 2013 to 2018. Previously he had been a member of the Provincial Assembly of the North-West Frontier Province from 2002 to 2007.

== Life and career ==
Idrees had a degree in Bachelor of Arts.

Idrees was elected to the Provincial Assembly of the North-West Frontier Province as an independent candidate from Constituency PF-48 (Abbottabad-V) in the 2002 Pakistani general election. He received 13,928 votes and defeated a candidate of Muttahida Majlis-e-Amal (MMA). He joined Jamiat Ulema-e Islam (F) (JUI-F) after becoming elected. In December 2002, he was inducted into the North-West Frontier Province (NWFP) provincial cabinet of Chief Minister Akram Khan Durrani and was appointed provincial minister of NWFP for local government and rural development.

Idrees ran for the seat of the Provincial Assembly of the North-West Frontier Province as a candidate of MMA from Constituency PF-48 Abbottabad-V in the 2008 Pakistani general election but was unsuccessful. He received 22,354 votes and lost the seat to a candidate of Pakistan Muslim League (N). In November 2008, he quit JUI-F and joined Pakistan Peoples Party (PPP).

Idrees was re-elected to the Provincial Assembly of Khyber Pakhtunkhwa as a candidate of Pakistan Tehreek-e-Insaf from Constituency PK-48 Abbottabad-V in the 2013 Pakistani general election. He received 32,998 votes and defeated a candidate of Pakistan Muslim League (N).

Idrees also contested the 2018 general elections but lost to Sardar Aurangzeb of Pakistan Muslim League (N).

Idrees died on 25 March 2023.
