= Khyber Pakhtunkhwa Ehtesab Commission =

Accountability body formed by the provincial government of Khyber Pakhtunkhwa, Pakistan

- خیبر پختونخوا احتساب کمیشن

Agency overview
- Formed: 10 January 2014
- Dissolved: 29 December 2018
- Superseding agency: Anti-Corruption Establishment, Khyber Pakhtunkhwa
- Jurisdiction: Government of Khyber Pakhtunkhwa
- Headquarters: Peshawar, Khyber Pakhtunkhwa, Pakistan
- Agency executive: Justice (Retd) Hamid Farooq Durrani, Chief Ehtesab Commissioner

The Khyber Pakhtunkhwa Ehtesab Commission (KPEC) lit. 'Khyber Pakhtunkhwa Accountability Commission' was an accountability body formed by the provincial government of Khyber Pakhtunkhwa, Pakistan, to investigate and prosecute corruption and financial irregularities in the province. The commission was established under the Khyber Pakhtunkhwa Accountability Commission Act 2014.

It was intended to complement or partially take over some of the roles of existing anti-corruption institutions, such as the Anti-Corruption Establishment (ACE), to provide an independent body to examine financial losses to the provincial treasury, conduct investigations within specified time limits, and refer cases to the Accountability Court.

Between April 2015 and early 2016, about 40 suspects, including two former ministers, were arrested. The KPEC registered about 16 cases of corruption, abuse of power, illegal mining, etc., causing a loss of about Rs 6,071,665,000 (US$58.3 million~) to the exchequer.

== Formation and legal framework ==
The commission was established on the basis of legislation as the KP Ehtesab Commission Act, 2014. It was led by a Chief Ehtesab Commissioner and Ehtesab Commissioners. For example, in 2014, Justice (retd) Hamid Farooq Durrani was appointed as the Chief Ehtesab Commissioner along with other commissioners.

The KPEC had its own courts (Ehtesab Courts), which heard cases referred by the commission.

=== Amendments ===
Amendments were made to its law in 2016. One significant amendment was that the Assembly passed a bill to revise the jurisdiction of KPEC, whereby cases involving damages of less than Rs50 million would come under KPEC, while smaller cases would go to ACE. The inquiry period (60 days) and the investigation period (90 days) were defined, with the possibility of extension under certain conditions.

A proposed ordinance was also introduced in 2016 that would have increased the powers of accountability commissioners, reduced the powers of the director general, made the approval of a five-member commission mandatory for arrests, and reduced the maximum period of physical detention from 45 to 15 days. The ordinance was criticized, and then PTI-led government later decided to withdraw some of its amendments.

== Notable cases ==
=== Gul Sahib Khan's father case ===
In April 2015, MPA Gul Sahib Khan's father Noor Daraz Khattak, was arrested on charges of illegal appointments and contracts during his tenure as Town Municipal Officer in Towns 1 and 3 and was also arrested in a land-grabbing case in Kohat. Along with the allegations of irregularities in contracts and appointments.

=== Liaqat Shabab case ===
In May 2015, Liaqat Shabab (former minister of the Khyber Pakhtunkhwa Department of Excise and Taxation) arrested on charges of amassing assets beyond his known sources of income. The commission had issued a form for the declaration of assets. His failure to provide satisfactory justification for his assets led to the arrest.

=== Ziaullah Afridi case ===
In July 2015, Ziaullah Afridi (then Provincial minister of Khyber Pakhtunkhwa Department of Minerals Development) was arrested along with nine others on charges of violating the ban on issuing tenders, abuse of power, favoring certain contractors, illegal mining, and corruption in the Mines and Minerals Department. It was claimed that the provincial treasury suffered losses of billions of rupees.

After the statements of Dr. Liaquat Ali, DG Mines and Minerals, and co-accused Afridi came to light, Dr. Liaquat Ali, Afridi, Mir Zaman, and other departmental officers, licensing/directorate officials were arrested as co-accused. The charges include illegal allotment of mineral leases, illegal mining operations, and misuse of authority.

=== Ex-Ehtesab DG’s allegations ===
In February 2016, Muhammad Hamid Khan (former DG, KPEC) leveled corruption allegations against the then KP government led by PTI. PTI workers demanded a transparent inquiry into him and asked whether every member of the provincial assembly, including the Chief Minister, should be investigated. The workers also said that if the allegations are true, then an investigation should be conducted, and if they are baseless, then appropriate action should be taken against Hamid Khan. Later, he resigned in protest.

=== Islamia College University case ===
On 3 November 2016, Islamia College University professor Dr. Naeem Khalid was arrested following complaints from university staff. He is accused of illegal appointments worth crores of rupees from university funds, embezzlement of funds, and misuse of authority in the university.

== Challenges and criticisms ==
After its first year, the body was widely seen as dysfunctional. The lack of full-time leadership, internal conflicts among its directorate and commissioners, and frequent amendments to its founding law hampered its work.

Several positions in the commission remained vacant, including the key post of Director General (after the resignation of Lieutenant General (retd) Hamid Khan in 2016).

During its existence, the commission has spent Rs 1.056 billion from public funds in about four years. Critics pointed out that despite this expenditure, while the results were meager.

== Abolition ==
The Khyber Pakhtunkhwa Assembly passed the Ehtesab Commission (Repeal) Act 2018, repealing the original 2014 Act, thus formally dissolving the Ehtesab Commission and its courts.

After the abolition, all pending inquiries, investigations and references initiated by the commission were transferred to the Anti-Corruption Establishment (ACE) of Khyber Pakhtunkhwa.

The services of contract employees were terminated. Regular employees were given the option to join as additional employees under the "Golden handshake" or the provincial government.

== See also ==
- Corruption in Pakistan
- National Accountability Bureau
