= PK-97 Karak-I =

Pakistani electoral district

- Constituency for the Khyber Pakhtunkhwa Assembly
- Region: Banda Daud Shah Tehsil and Karak Tehsil (partly) of Karak District

Current constituency
- Party: Muttahida Majlis-e-Amal
- Member(s): Nisar Gul
- Created from: PK-40 Karak-I (before 2018) PK-85 Karak-I (2018-2022)

PK-97 Karak-I (پی کے-97 کرک-1) is a constituency for the Khyber Pakhtunkhwa Assembly of the Khyber Pakhtunkhwa province of Pakistan.

== See also ==
- PK-96 Kurram-II
- PK-98 Karak-II
