= Mayor of Peshawar =

Head of Local Government of Peshawar (District Council Peshawar)

- ناظم پشاور
- City District Government Peshawar
- Incumbent; Zubair Ali since 16 March 2022
- Residence: Peshawar, Pakistan
- Term length: Four years
- Website: cdgpeshawar.gov.pk

Nazim-e-Peshawar (Urdu: ناظم پشاور) is the Mayor who heads the Municipal Corporation of Peshawar (MCP) which controls the City District Government of Peshawar.

== Khyber Pakhtunkhwa Local Government Act 2013 ==
Under the KPK Local government Act 2013, the City District Government of Peshawar by the District Council is formed which is divided into four towns each headed by its own Town Nazim and Naib Nazim.

following is the number of Peshawar district council members

District	General	Women	Peasant/Workers	Minorities	Youth	Total
Peshawar	92	31	5	5	5	138

== List of mayors of Peshawar ==
#	Party	Mayor	Start date	End date	Deputy Mayor
1		Azam Khan Afridi	2001	2005	Dr. Muhammad Iqbal Khalil
2		Haji Ghulam Ali	17 October 2005	11 February 2009	Razaullah
3		Haji Mohammad Umar	2010	2014	
4		Arbab Asim Khan	30 August 2015	2021	Syed Qasim Ali Shah
5		Zubair Ali	16 March 2022	Incumbent	-

== Mayor elections history ==
=== Mayor elections 2015 ===
Peshawar City District Government Elections 2015.
#	Party	Town 1	Town 2	Town 3	Town 4	PMC	Percentage
1	Pakistan Tehreek-e-Insaf	16	13	11	4	44	55.7%
2	Jamiat Ulema-e-Islam (F)	0	2	3	2	7	9%
3	Jamaat-e-Islami Pakistan	0	2	2	2	6	7.6%
4	Pakistan Muslim League (N)	0	0	0	5	5	6.3%
5	Awami National Party	3	0	0	1	4	5%
6	Pakistan Peoples Party	0	2	0	0	2	2.5%
7	Independents	1	3	4	3	11	13.9%
-	Results awaited	5	3	1	4	13	14%
-	Total	25	25	21	21	92	100%
Votes Polled		485,042					32.8%
Total Votes		1,479,002					100%

=== Mayor election 2021 ===
Local bodies election were held on 19 December 2021 after the implementation of new local body structure in Khyber Pakhtunkhwa.

2021 KPK Local Bodies Election
Party	Candidate	Votes	%
JUI-F	Zubair Ali	62,388	
PTI	Rizwan Bangash	50,669	
PPP	Arbab Zarak Khan	45,000	
JUI (F) gain from PTI		Swing	

== See also ==
- Khyber Pakhtunkhwa Local Government Act 2013
- Union Councils of District Peshawar
