= Nisar Gul =

Pakistani politician

Member of the Provincial Assembly of Khyber Pakhtunkhwa
- In office 13 August 2018 – 18 January 2023
- Constituency: PK-85 (Karak-I)
- In office 20 March 2008 – 20 March 2013
- Constituency: PK-40 (Karak-I)

Personal details
- Born: Mian Nisar Gul
- Party: PTI-P (2025-present)
- Other political affiliations: JUI (F) (2013-2025); ANP (2008-2013)

Mian Nisar Gul is a Pakistani politician who had been a member of the Provincial Assembly of Khyber Pakhtunkhwa from March 2008 to March 2013 and August 2018 to January 2023.

== Political career ==
He was elected to the Provincial Assembly of the North-West Frontier Province as a candidate of the Pakistan Tehreek-e-Insaf (PTI) from PF-40 Kohat-IV in the 2002 North-West Frontier Province provincial election. He received 13,835 votes and defeated Muhammad Iqbal Khattak, a candidate of the Muttahida Majlis-e-Amal (MMA). However, during the assembly's tenure, he switched parties, becoming a member of the MMA.

He was re-elected to the Provincial Assembly of the North-West Frontier Province as an independent candidate from PF-40 Kohat-IV in the 2008 North-West Frontier Province provincial election. He received 29,047 votes and defeated Fareed Khan Toofan, a candidate of the Pakistan People's Party (PPP).

After the election, he joined the Awami National Party (ANP) and was inducted into the provincial cabinet of Chief Minister Haider Khan Hoti as the Minister for Prisons. On 25 February 2013, he resigned from the ANP and the provincial cabinet.

He contested the 2013 Khyber Pakhtunkhwa provincial election as an independent candidate from PK-40 Kohat-IV, but was unsuccessful. He received 23,017 votes and lost to Gul Sahib Khan, a candidate of the PTI.

On 8 September 2013, he joined the Jamiat Ulema-e-Islam (F) (JUI(F)).

He was elected to the Provincial Assembly of Khyber Pakhtunkhwa as a candidate of the MMA from PK-85 (Karak-I) in the 2018 Khyber Pakhtunkhwa provincial election. He received 30,253 votes and defeated Fareed Khan Toofan, a candidate of the PTI.

Following his successful election, he was nominated as the joint opposition's candidate for the office of Chief Minister of Khyber Pakhtunkhwa. On 16 August 2018, he received 33 votes and lost the chief ministerial election to the PTI's Mahmood Khan, who secured 77 votes.
