= Gul Sahib Khan =

Pakistani politician

MPA Gul Sahib Khan

Member of the Khyber Pakhtunkhwa Assembly
- In office 31 May 2013 – 28 May 2018
- Constituency: PK-40 (Karak-I)

Personal details
- Party: ANP (2020-present)
- Other political affiliations: PTI (2013-2018)
- Occupation: Politician

Gul Sahib Khan is a Pakistani politician hailing from Karak District, who served as a member of the 10th Khyber Pakhtunkhwa Assembly, belonging to the Pakistan Tehreek-e-Insaf. He is also serving as chairman and member of the different committees

== Political career ==
Khan was elected as the member of the Provincial Assembly of Khyber Pakhtunkhwa from PK-40 (Karak-I) in the 2013 Pakistani general election on the ticket of Pakistan Tehreek-e-Insaf (PTI). He received 24,849 votes and defeated Nisar Gul, an independent candidate.

On 7 March 2020, he joined the Awami National Party (ANP) and contested the 2024 general elections and failed.

== Controversies ==
In April 2015, Gul Sahib Khan's father, Noor Daraz Khattak, was arrested by the Khyber Pakhtunkhwa Ehtesab Commission on charges of illegal appointments and contracts during his tenure as Town Municipal Officer in Towns 1 and 3 and was also arrested in a land-grabbing case in Kohat. Along with the allegations of irregularities in contracts and appointments.
