= Liaqat Shabab =

Pakistani politician (died 2023)

- لیاقت شباب

Provincial Minister for Excise and Taxation in Khyber Pakhtunkhwa
- In office ?–?

Personal details
- Died: 4 July 2023
- Political party: Pakistan Peoples Party (PPP)

Liaqat Shabab (died 4 July 2023) was a Pakistani politician who served as provincial minister for Excise and Taxation in Khyber Pakhtunkhwa. He belonged to Pakistan Peoples Party (PPP). Shabab died from a cardiac arrest on 4 July 2023.

== Arrest ==
In May 2015, Shabab was arrested by the Khyber Pakhtunkhwa Ehtesab Commission on charges of amassing assets beyond his known sources of income. The commission had issued a form for the declaration of assets. His failure to provide a satisfactory justification for his assets led to his arrest.
