= Fazal Hakim =

Pakistani politician

Provincial Minister of Livestock and Fisheries for Khyber Pakhtunkhwa
- In office 25 July 2024 – 13 October 2025
- Chief Minister: Ali Amin Gandapur

Member of the Provincial Assembly of Khyber Pakhtunkhwa
- Incumbent
- Assumed office 29 February 2024
- Constituency: PK-6 (Swat-IV)
- In office 13 August 2018 – 18 January 2023
- Preceded by: Himself
- Constituency: PK-5 (Swat-IV)
- In office 31 May 2013 – 28 May 2018
- Preceded by: Wajid Ali Khan
- Constituency: PK-80 (Swat-I)

President of PTI Malakand
- Incumbent
- Assumed office 16 January 2022
- Chairman: Imran Khan; Gohar Ali Khan

Personal details
- Born: 4 April 1974 (age 52) Swat District, Khyber Pakhtunkhwa, Pakistan
- Party: PTI (2013-present)
- Occupation: Politician

Fazal Hakim Khan (Pashto: فضل حکیم: born 4 April 1974) is a Pakistani politician hailing from Swat District, who is currently a member of the Provincial Assembly of Khyber Pakhtunkhwa since 2024, and prior to that from August 2018 till January 2023. He also served as member of the 10th Provincial Assembly of Khyber Pakhtunkhwa from 2013 to 2018, belonging to the Pakistan Tehreek-e-Insaf (PTI). He also served as member of the different committees. He is a member of PTI and served as Provincial Minister of Livestock and Fisheries for Khyber Pakhtunkhwa in the Gandapur ministry.

== Political career ==
Fazal Hakim was elected as the member of the Khyber Pakhtunkhwa Assembly on ticket of Pakistan Tehreek-e-Insaf (PTI) from PK-80 (Swat-I) in the 2013 Khyber Pakhtunkhwa provincial election. He was re-elected from PK-5 (Swat-IV) in the 2018 Khyber Pakhtunkhwa provincial election on a PTI ticket. He was re-elected from PK-6 Swat-IV in the 2024 Khyber Pakhtunkhwa provincial election on a PTI-backed Independent ticket. Following his victory from his constituency he was made Provincial Minister of Climate Change, Forestry, Environment and Wildlife for Khyber Pakhtunkhwa in March 2024 by Chief Minister Ali Amin Gandapur and the Pakistan Tehreek-e-Insaf.

Reports surfaced of rising deforestation in Khyber Pakhtunkhwa, following this, Chief Minister Ali Amin Gandapur on the advice of Imran Khan in Adiala Jail removed Fazal Hakim from the Forestry ministry and reassigned him to the role of Minister of Livestock and Fisheries, which he is serving as today.

As minister, he stated that he would prioritize growing the livestock sector primarily by giving better conditions to animals with veterinary farms and quality feed. Fazal Hakim inaugurated a project in January 2025 aimed at improving livestock productivity through artificial insemination in Khyber Pakhtunkhwa.
