= PK-77 Peshawar-VI =

Pakistani electoral district

- Constituency for the Khyber Pakhtunkhwa Assembly
- Region: Hassan Khel Tehsil, Badbher Tehsil (partly) and Peshtakhara Tehsil (partly) of Peshawar District

Current constituency
- Party: Awami National Party
- Member: Salahuddin Khan
- Created from: PK-10 Peshawar-X (2002-2018); PK-71 Peshawar-VI (2018-2023)

PK-77 Peshawar-VI (پی کے-77 پشاور-6) is a constituency for the Khyber Pakhtunkhwa Assembly of the Khyber Pakhtunkhwa province of Pakistan.

== See also ==
- PK-76 Peshawar-V
- PK-78 Peshawar-VII
