= Zia Ullah Khan Bangash =

Pakistani politician

Member of the Provincial Assembly of Khyber Pakhtunkhwa
- In office 13 August 2018 – 18 January 2023
- Constituency: PK-82 (Kohat-III)
- In office 31 May 2013 – 28 May 2018
- Constituency: Constituency PK-38 (Kohat-II)

Personal details
- Born: 2 March 1978 (age 48) Kohat, Khyber Pakhtunkhwa, Pakistan
- Party: ANP (2025-present)
- Other political affiliations: PTI-P (2023-2025); PTI (2013-2023)

Zia Ullah Khan Bangash (Urdu: ضیا اللہ خان بنگش) is a Pakistani politician who had been a Member of the Provincial Assembly of Khyber Pakhtunkhwa, from May 2013 to May 2018 and from August 2018 to January 2023. He was Advisor to the Chief Minister of Khyber Pakhtunkhwa on Science Technology and Information Technology but resigned from his post on 17 April 2021 stating that he is resigning due to "unavoidable circumstances".

== Early life and education ==
He was born on 2 March 1978 in Kohat.

He has a degree in Master of Arts in Political Science.

== Political career ==
He was elected to the Provincial Assembly of Khyber Pakhtunkhwa as a candidate of Pakistan Tehreek-e-Insaf (PTI) from Constituency PK-38 Kohat-II in 2013 Pakistani general election. He received 20,796 votes and defeated a candidate of Pakistan Peoples Party.

He was re-elected to Provincial Assembly of Khyber Pakhtunkhwa as a candidate of PTI from Constituency PK-82 (Kohat-III) in 2018 Pakistani general election.

On 14 September 2018, he was appointed as adviser to the Chief Minister of Khyber Pakhtunkhwa Mahmood Khan for elementary and secondary education.
