= Ruqia Hina =

Pakistani politician

Ruqia Hina MPA

Member of the Provincial Assembly of Khyber Pakhtunkhwa
- Incumbent
- Assumed office 29 May 2013
- Constituency: Reserved seat for women

Personal details
- Party: Pakistan Muslim League (N)

Ruqia Hina (Urdu: رقیہ حنا) is a Pakistani politician who has been a Member of the Provincial Assembly of Khyber Pakhtunkhwa, since May 2013.

== Education ==
Hina has completed matriculation education.

== Political career ==
Hina was elected to the Provincial Assembly of Khyber Pakhtunkhwa as a candidate of Pakistan Muslim League (N) on a reserved seat for women in the 2013 Pakistani general election.

In May 2016, she joined a resolution to establish a Women's Caucus in the Provincial Assembly of Khyber Pakhtunkhwa. She also joined a resolution to declare 8 July as Charity Day in honour of Abdul Sattar Edhi.
