= Javed Nasim =

Pakistani politician

Javed Nasim MPA

Parliamentary Secretary in the Khyber Pakhtunkhwa Assembly
- In office 16 October 2015 – 28 May 2018

Member of the Khyber Pakhtunkhwa Assembly
- In office 31 May 2013 – 28 May 2018
- Constituency: PK-03 (Peshawar-III)

Personal details
- Party: PTI (2013-present)
- Occupation: Politician

Javed Nasim is a Pakistani politician hailing from Peshawar, belonging to Pakistan Tehreek-e-Insaf, who served as a Member of the 10th Khyber Pakhtunkhwa Assembly. He is also serving as Parliamentary Secretary in the Khyber Pakhtunkhwa Assembly.

== Political career ==
Nasim was elected as the member of the Khyber Pakhtunkhwa Assembly on ticket of Pakistan Tehreek-e-Insaf from PK-03 (Peshawar-III) in the 2013 Pakistani general election by taking 18080 votes against Awami National Party's Haroon Bashir Bilour.

Nasim developed personal difference with Chief minister khyber pakhtunkhwa, Pervez Khattak, on which he went public and staged a protest against him, charging him with corruption and nepotism. Nasim was served show cause notice by PTI leadership on violating party discipline in early October 2014. However, he was unable to explain his position, therefore, on 26 October 2014 his basic membership from party was cancelled on violating party's discipline. In March, 2015 Pakistani Senate election he sided Waqar Ahmed Khan, an independent candidate, instead of PTI's nominated candidate, Pakistan Tehreek-e-Insaf barred him for casting vote. Party's Information Secretary Shireen Mazari, in March 2015, wrote a letter seeking suspension from Khyber Pakhtunkhwa Assembly. She maintained that, his basic membership was suspended for going public against party, and now he went against party in senate polls. However, Election Commission of Pakistan rejected Pakistan Tehreek-e-Insaf's plea and maintained membership of Nasim. To keep further conflicts in check, Chief minister Pervaiz Khattak politically addressed the problem through dialogues, he also appointed Nasim at position of parliamentary secretary. Nasim was allegedly involved in horse trading during 2018 Pakistani Senate election and didn't voted PTI's supported candidates.
