= Haji Ghulam Ali =

Pakistani politician

34th Governor of Khyber Pakhtunkhwa
- In office 23 November 2022 – 4 May 2024
- Appointed by: Arif Alvi
- President: Arif Alvi; Asif Ali Zardari
- Prime Minister: Shehbaz Sharif; Anwaar ul Haq Kakar (caretaker); Shehbaz Sharif
- Chief Minister: Mahmood Khan; Muhammad Azam Khan (caretaker); Arshad Hussain Shah (caretaker); Ali Amin Gandapur
- Preceded by: Shah Farman
- Succeeded by: Faisal Karim Kundi

Mayor of Peshawar
- In office 17 October 2005 – 11 February 2009

Member of the Senate of Pakistan
- In office March 2009 – March 2015
- Constituency: General seat from Khyber Pakhtunkhwa

Personal details
- Born: Ghulam Ali
- Party: JUI(F) (2009-present)
- Relations: Zubair Ali (son)
- Education: Bachelor of Arts
- Occupation: Politician

Haji Ghulam Ali (Urdu: حاجی غلام علی) is a Pakistani politician and a member of Jamiat Ulema-e-Islam (F) who served as 34th Governor of Khyber Pakhtunkhwa from 23 November 2022 to 4 May 2024. He has previously served as the Mayor of Peshawar for more than 3 years and as a member of the Senate from 2009 to 2015, for 6 years.

== Political career ==
In March 2009 he was elected to the Senate of Pakistan on general seat as Jameet Ulema Islam (F) candidate. He is the chairperson of the Senate Committee on Commerce and Textile Industry, and member: committee of States and frontier Regions, inter-provincial coordination, and parliamentary affairs. His son Fayaz Ali is Son In Law of Jamiat Ulema-e-Islam Leader Fazal-ur-Rehman (politician) while his other son Zubair Ali is Mayor Peshawar City.

== See also ==
- List of Senators of Pakistan
- Ayatullah Durrani
- Hafiz Hamdullah

Political offices
Preceded by Shah Farman	Governor of Khyber Pakhtunkhwa; 23 November 2022 - Present	Succeeded by Faisal Karim Kundi
