= Tufail Anjum =

Pakistani politician

Member of the Provincial Assembly of Khyber Pakhtunkhwa
- In office 13 August 2018 – 18 January 2023
- Constituency: PK-49 (Mardan-II)
- In office 29 May 2013 – 28 May 2018
- Constituency: Constituency PK-29 (Mardan-VII)
- Incumbent
- Assumed office 29 February 2024
- Constituency: PK-55 Mardan-II

Personal details
- Born: 16 April 1985 (age 40) Mardan District, Khyber Pakhtunkhwa, Pakistan
- Party: PTI (2013-present)

Tufail Anjum (born 16 April 1985) is a Pakistani politician who has been a member of the Provincial Assembly of Khyber Pakhtunkhwa, since 2013.

== Early life and education ==
He was born on 16 April 1985 in Mardan District to a dilzak family.

He has a degree in Bachelor of Business Administration.

== Political career ==
He was elected to the Provincial Assembly of Khyber Pakhtunkhwa as a candidate of Pakistan Tehreek-e-Insaf (PTI) from Constituency PK-29 Mardan-VII in the 2013 Pakistani general election. He received 15,986 votes and defeated Abdul Akbar Khan.

He was re-elected to Provincial Assembly of Khyber Pakhtunkhwa as a candidate of PTI from Constituency PK-49 (Mardan-II) in the 2018 Pakistani general election.

Anjum was again re-elected to Provincial Assembly of Khyber Pakhtunkhwa as an independent candidate from Constituency PK-55 (Mardan-II) in the 2024 Pakistani general election.
