= Qurban Ali Khan (politician) =

Pakistani politician

Member of the Provincial Assembly of Khyber Pakhtunkhwa
- In office 29 May 2013 – 28 May 2018
- Constituency: Constituency PK-16 (Nowshera-V)

Personal details
- Party: PTI (2013-present)

Qurban Ali Khan is a Pakistani politician who had been a Member of the Provincial Assembly of Khyber Pakhtunkhwa, from May 2013 to May 2018. Previously he has been a member of the Provincial Assembly of the North-West Frontier Province from 2002 to 2007.

== Political career ==
He was elected to the Provincial Assembly of the North-West Frontier Province as a candidate of Pakistan Peoples Party (PPP) from Constituency PF-16 (Nowshera-V) in the 2002 Pakistani general election. He received 8,691 votes and defeated a candidate of Awami National Party (ANP).

He ran for the seat of the Provincial Assembly of the North-West Frontier Province as a candidate of PPP from Constituency PF-16 (Nowshera-V) in the 2008 Pakistani general election but was unsuccessful. He received 7,753 votes and lost the seat to Pervaiz Ahmad Khan, a candidate of ANP.

He was re-elected to the Provincial Assembly of Khyber Pakhtunkhwa as a candidate of Pakistan Tehreek-e-Insaf from Constituency PK-16 (Nowshera-V) in the 2013 Pakistani general election. He received 9,282 votes and defeated a candidate of Awami National Party.
