= Mussarat Ahmed Zeb =

Pakistani politician

Member of the National Assembly of Pakistan
- In office 1 June 2013 – 31 May 2018
- Constituency: Reserved seat for women

Personal details
- Party: Pakistan Muslim League (N) (present)

Mussarat Ahmed Zeb (Urdu: مسرت احمد ذیب) is a Pakistani politician who had been a member of the National Assembly of Pakistan from June 2013 to May 2018. She is the widowed wife of Miangul Ahmed Zeb, son of the Wāli of Swat Miangul Jahan Zeb.

== Political career ==
She was elected to the National Assembly of Pakistan as a candidate of Pakistan Tehreek-e-Insaf (PTI) on a reserved seat for women from Khyber Pakhtunkhwa in the 2013 Pakistani general election.

In 2014, PTI cancelled her membership and asked for her disqualification from the membership of National Assembly.

In May 2018, she quit PTI and in September 2021, she joined the Awami National Party.
