= Ziaullah Afridi =

Pakistani politician

Member of the Provincial Assembly of Khyber Pakhtunkhwa
- In office 29 May 2013 – 28 May 2018
- Constituency: PK-01 (Peshawar-I)

Provincial Minister of Khyber Pakhtunkhwa for Mines and Mineral Development
- In office March 2014 – July 2015

Personal details
- Born: 2 February 1972 (age 54) Peshawar, Khyber Pakhtunkhwa, Pakistan

Ziaullah Khan Afridi (Urdu: ضیا الله خان آفریدی) is a Pakistani politician who had been a Member of the Provincial Assembly of Khyber Pakhtunkhwa, from May 2013 to May 2018. He had been Provincial minister of Khyber Pakhtunkhwa for mines and mineral development from March 2014 to July 2015.

== Early life and education ==
He was born on 2 February 1972.

He has completed intermediate education.

== Political career ==
He was elected to the Provincial Assembly of Khyber Pakhtunkhwa as a candidate of Pakistan Tehreek-e-Insaf (PTI) from Constituency PK-01 (Peshawar-I) in the 2013 Pakistani general election. He received 22,932 votes and defeated a candidate of Pakistan Muslim League (J).

In March 2014, he was inducted into the provincial Khyber Pakhtunkhwa cabinet of Chief Minister Pervez Khattak and was made Provincial minister of Khyber Pakhtunkhwa for mines and mineral development.

In August 2017, he quit PTI and joined Pakistan Peoples Party. In September 2017, PTI petitioned the Election Commission of Pakistan to unseat Afridi from Khyber Pakhtunkhwa assembly on the grounds for quitting PTI. The petition was rejected in February 2018.

== Corruption charges ==
In July 2015, he was arrested by the Khyber Pakhtunkhwa Ehtesab Commission on charges of corruption. The same month, his party membership was suspended by PTI and he was removed from the Khyber Pakhtunkhwa provincial cabinet.

He was released from jail in October 2016 on bail.
