= Yaseen Khan Khalil =

Pakistani politician

Member of the Provincial Assembly of Khyber Pakhtunkhwa
- In office 29 May 2013 – 28 May 2018
- Constituency: Constituency PK-05 (Peshawar-V)

Personal details
- Party: PTI (2013-present)

Yaseen Khan Khalil is a Pakistani politician who was a Member of the Provincial Assembly of Khyber Pakhtunkhwa, from May 2013 to May 2018.

== Political career ==
He ran for the seat of the Provincial Assembly of the North-West Frontier Province as an independent candidate from Constituency PF-05 (Peshawar-V) in the 2008 Pakistani general election but was unsuccessful. He received 5,292 votes and lost the election to Ateef ur Rehman, a candidate of Awami National Party.

He was elected to the Provincial Assembly of Khyber Pakhtunkhwa as a candidate of Pakistan Tehreek-e-Insaf from Constituency PK-05 (Peshawar-V) in the 2013 Pakistani general election. He received 31,639 votes and defeated a candidate of Jamiat Ulema-e Islam (F).
