= Zareen Riaz =

Pakistani politician

Member of the Provincial Assembly of Khyber Pakhtunkhwa
- In office 29 May 2013 – 28 May 2018
- Constituency: Reserved seat for women

Personal details
- Party: PTI (2013-present)

Zareen Riaz (Urdu: زرین ریاض) is a Pakistani politician who had been a Member of the Provincial Assembly of Khyber Pakhtunkhwa from May 2013 to May 2018.

== Education ==
She has a Bachelor of Arts degree.

== Political career ==
She was elected to the Provincial Assembly of Khyber Pakhtunkhwa as a candidate of Pakistan Tehreek-e-Insaf on a reserved seat for women in the 2013 Pakistani general election.

In May 2016, Riaz joined a resolution to establish a Women's Caucus in the Provincial Assembly of Khyber Pakhtunkhwa. She also joined a resolution to declare 8 July as Charity Day in honour of Abdul Sattar Edhi.
