= Ubaid Ullah Mayar =

Pakistani politician

Member of the Khyber Pakhtunkhwa Assembly
- In office 29 May 2013 – 28 May 2018
- Constituency: Constituency PK-51 (Mardan-III)

Personal details
- Born: 02-10-1978 Mardan
- Spouse: Haleema Ubaid
- Children: Mohammad Ahmad khan, Gulwareena Ubaid

Ubaid Ullah Mayar is a Pakistani politician who had been a Member of the Provincial Assembly of Khyber Pakhtunkhwa, from May 2013 to May 2018.His wife is also a beaurecrate ...he has one son and one daughter..

== Political career ==
He was elected to the Provincial Assembly of Khyber Pakhtunkhwa as a candidate of Pakistan Tehreek-e-Insaf from Constituency PK-25 Mardan-III in the 2013 Pakistani general election. He received 16,851 votes and defeated a candidate of Awami National Party.

In March 2018, he was accused of horse-trading in the 2018 Senate election. Following which Imran Khan announced to expel him from the PTI and issued him a show cause notice to explain his position. In April 2018, he quit PTI and joined Pakistan Peoples Party.
