= Sami Ullah =

Pakistani politician

Provincial Minister of Khyber Pakhtunkhwa for Industries and Commerce
- In office March 2012 – March 2013

Member of the Provincial Assembly of Khyber Pakhtunkhwa
- In office 2008–2013
- Constituency: PK-65 (D.I. Khan-II)
- In office 2013–2018
- Constituency: PF-65 (D.I. Khan-II)

Personal details
- Party: PTI-P (2025-present)
- Other political affiliations: JUI (F) (2022-2025); PTI (2013-2022); PPP (2008-2013)

Sami Ullah Alizai is a Pakistani politician who had been a Member of the Provincial Assembly of Khyber Pakhtunkhwa, from 2008 to 2013 and then again from 2013 to 2018.

== Political career ==
He was elected to the Provincial Assembly of the North-West Frontier Province as a candidate of Pakistan Peoples Party (PPP) from Constituency PF-65 (D.I. Khan-II) in by-polls held in 2008. In March 2012, he was inducted into the North-West Frontier Province (NWFP) provincial cabinet of Chief Minister Ameer Haider Khan Hoti and was appointed as Provincial Minister of NWFP for Industries and Commerce. In March 2013, he quit PPP.

He was re-elected to the Provincial Assembly of Khyber Pakhtunkhwa as an independent candidate from Constituency PK-65 (D.I. Khan-II) in the 2013 Pakistani general election. He received 25,921 votes and defeated Tariq Rahim Kundi, a candidate of PPP.

In May 2013, he joined Pakistan Tehreek-e-Insaf.

In December 2022, he left Pakistan Tehreek-e-Insaf and joined Jamiat Ulema-e-Islam (F).
