= Muhammad Zahid Durrani =

Pakistani politician

Member of the Provincial Assembly of Khyber Pakhtunkhwa
- In office 29 May 2013 – 28 May 2018
- Constituency: Constituency PK-24 (Mardan-II)

Muhammad Zahid Durrani is a Pakistani politician who had been a Member of the Provincial Assembly of Khyber Pakhtunkhwa, from May 2013 to May 2018.

== Political career ==
He was elected to the Provincial Assembly of Khyber Pakhtunkhwa as a candidate of Pakistan Tehreek-e-Insaf (PTI) from Constituency PK-24 Mardan-II in the 2013 Pakistani general election. He received 12,302 votes and defeated a candidate of Awami National Party.

In March 2018, he was accused of horse-trading in the 2018 Senate election. Following which Imran Khan announced to expel him from the party and served him a show cause notice, to explain his position. In April 2018, he quit PTI and joined Pakistan Peoples Party.
