= Nargis Ali =

Pakistani politician (born 1965)

Member of the Provincial Assembly of Khyber Pakhtunkhwa
- In office 29 May 2013 – 28 May 2018
- Constituency: Reserved seat for women

Personal details
- Born: 1 January 1965 (age 61)

Nargis Ali (Urdu: نرگس علی; born 1 January 1965) is a Pakistani politician who had been a member of the Provincial Assembly of Khyber Pakhtunkhwa from May 2013 to May 2018.

== Early life and education ==
Ali was born on 1 January 1965.

She has a Bachelor of Education degree.

== Political career ==
She was elected to the Provincial Assembly of Khyber Pakhtunkhwa as a candidate of Pakistan Tehreek-e-Insaf on a reserved seat for women in the 2013 Pakistani general election.

In November 2013, she was made Parliamentary Secretary of Khyber Pakhtunkhwa Assembly for Relief, Rehabilitation and Settlement.

In May 2016, Ali joined a resolution to establish a Women's Caucus in the Provincial Assembly of Khyber Pakhtunkhwa. She also joined a resolution to declare 8 July as Charity Day in honour of Abdul Sattar Edhi.

In May 2018, Ali quit PTI and joined Pakistan Muslim League (Q).
