= PK-44 Abbottabad-III =

Pakistani electoral district

- Constituency for the Khyber Pakhtunkhwa Assembly
- Region: Lower Tanawal Tehsil, Abbottabad and Havelian Tehsils (partly) in Abbottabad District

Current constituency
- Party: Pakistan Tehreek-e-Insaf
- Member(s): Qalandar Khan Lodhi
- Created from: PK-46 Abbottabad-III (2002-2018); PK-38 Abbottabad-III (2018-2023)

PK-44 Abbottabad-III (پی کے-44 ایبٹ آباد-3) is a constituency for the Khyber Pakhtunkhwa Assembly of the Khyber Pakhtunkhwa province of Pakistan.

== See also ==
- PK-43 Abbottabad-II
- PK-45 Abbottabad-IV
