= PK-42 Abbottabad-I =

Pakistani electoral district

- Constituency for the Khyber Pakhtunkhwa Assembly
- Region: Abbottabad Tehsil (partly) in Abbottabad District

Current constituency
- Party: Pakistan Tehreek-e-Insaf
- Member(s): Nazir Ahmed Abbasi
- Created from: PK-45 Abbottabad-II (2002-2018); PK-36 Abbottabad-I (2018-2023)

PK-42 Abbottabad-I (پی کے-42 ایبٹ آباد-1) is a constituency for the Khyber Pakhtunkhwa Assembly of the Khyber Pakhtunkhwa province of Pakistan.

== See also ==
- PK-41 Torghar
- PK-43 Abbottabad-II
