= PK-43 Abbottabad-II =

Pakistani electoral district

- Constituency for the Khyber Pakhtunkhwa Assembly
- Region: Galiat and Murree Galiat Cantonment of Abbottabad Tehsil, Havelian Tehsil Tehsil (partly) and Lora Tehsil in Abbottabad District

Current constituency
- Party: Pakistan Tehreek-e-Insaaf
- Member(s): Rajab Ali Khan Abbasi
- Created from: PK-47 Abbottabad-IV (2002-2018); PK-37 Abbottabad-II (2018-2023)

PK-43 Abbottabad-II (پی کے-43 ایبٹ آباد-2) is a constituency for the Khyber Pakhtunkhwa Assembly of the Khyber Pakhtunkhwa province of Pakistan.

== See also ==
- PK-42 Abbottabad-I
- PK-44 Abbottabad-III
