= PK-45 Abbottabad-IV =

Pakistani electoral district

- Constituency for the Khyber Pakhtunkhwa Assembly
- Region: Nawan Shehr town, Abbottabad city and Cantonment of Abbottabad Tehsil in Abbottabad District

Current constituency
- Party: Pakistan Tehreek-e-Insaf
- Member(s): Mushtaq Ahmed Ghani (speaker) KPK Assembly
- Created from: PK-44 Abbottabad-I (2002-2018); PK-39 Abbottabad-IV (2018-2022)

PK-45 Abbottabad-IV (پی کے-45 ایبٹ آباد-4) is a constituency for the Khyber Pakhtunkhwa Assembly of the Khyber Pakhtunkhwa province of Pakistan.

== See also ==
- PK-44 Abbottabad-III
- PK-46 Haripur-I
