= Mohammad Ibrahim Khan Jhagra =

Pakistani politician

Muhammad Ibrahim Khan (Urdu: محمد ابراہیم خان جھگڑا) was a leading politician of the Khyber-Pakhtunkhwa province of Pakistan. He was referred to informally by the name Jhagra Khan, and was often referred to as "the kingmaker of the frontier".

== Life ==
Coming from the outskirts of Peshawar area known as Khalisa, he joined Muhammad Ali Jinnah in the Pakistan movement. Jhagra Khan was a former Congressite and was largely responsible for gaining support for the Pakistan Muslim League (PML) in the Khyber Pakhtunkhwa province for Abdul Qayyum Khan, the first Chief Minister of the province after independence.

He was the General Secretary of the PML until he died. He died on 19 April 2017 in England, his family receiving condolences from many heads of nations including Queen Elizabeth II.
