= PK-92 Kohat-III =

Pakistani electoral district

- Constituency for the Khyber Pakhtunkhwa Assembly
- Region: Kohat Tehsil (partly) including Kohat city and Cantt of Kohat District

Current constituency
- Party: Pakistan Tehreek-e-Insaf
- Member: Shafi Ullah Jan
- Created from: PK-38 Kohat-II (2002-2018); PK-82 Kohat-III (2018-2023)

PK-92 Kohat-III (پی کے-92 کوہاٹ-3) is a constituency for the Khyber Pakhtunkhwa Assembly of the Khyber Pakhtunkhwa province of Pakistan.

== See also ==
- PK-91 Kohat-II
- PK-93 Hangu
