= Mushtaq Ahmed Ghani =

Pakistani politician

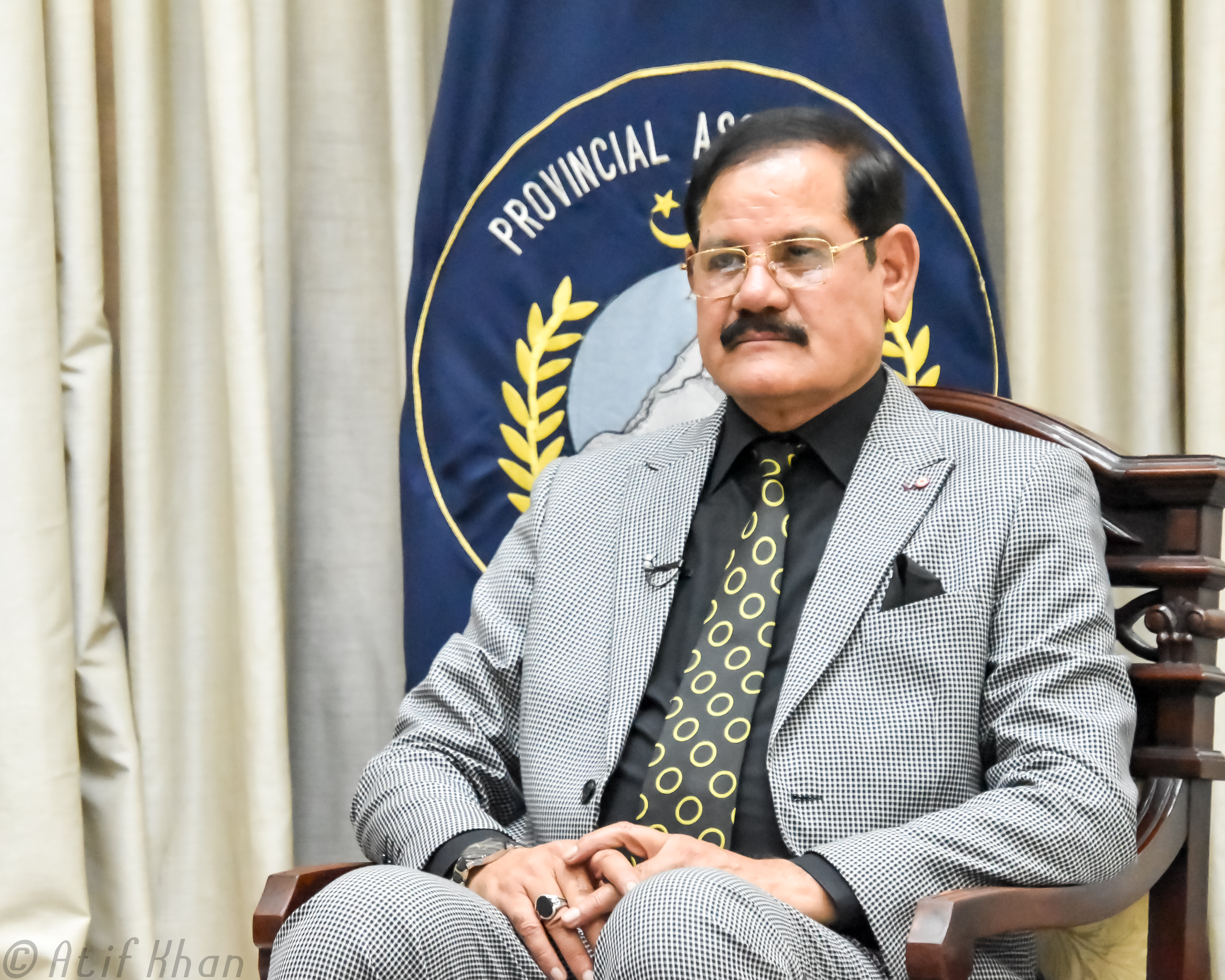

Speaker of the Provincial Assembly of Khyber Pakhtunkhwa
- In office 15 August 2018 – 29 February 2024
- Deputy: Mehmood Jan
- Preceded by: Asad Qaiser
- Succeeded by: Babar Saleem Swati

Member of the Provincial Assembly of Khyber Pakhtunkhwa
- Incumbent
- Assumed office 28 February 2024
- Constituency: PK-45 (Abbottabad-IV)
- In office 13 August 2018 – 18 January 2023
- Constituency: PK-39 (Abbottabad-IV)
- In office 31 May 2013 – 28 May 2018
- Constituency: PK-44 (Abbottabad-I)

Member of the Provincial Assembly of the North-West Frontier Province
- In office 27 November 2002 – 10 October 2007
- Constituency: PF-44 (Abbottabad-I)

Personal details
- Born: 30 October 1956 (age 69) Abbottabad, Khyber Pakhtunkhwa, Pakistan
- Party: PTI (1997-2002; 2013-present)
- Other political affiliations: PML(Q) (2002-2013)

Mushtaq Ahmed Ghani (Urdu: مشتاق احمد غنی; born 30 October 1956) is a Pakistani politician who served as Speaker of the Provincial Assembly of Khyber Pakhtunkhwa from 2018 till 2024.

He had been a member of the Provincial Assembly of Khyber Pakhtunkhwa from August 2018 till January 2023. Previously, he was a member of the Provincial Assembly of Khyber Pakhtunkhwa from 2013 to 2018 and served in the provincial cabinet of Chief Minister Pervez Khattak as Provincial Minister for Higher Education and Information.

== Early life and education ==
Mr. Mushtaq Ahmad Ghani son Mr. Abdul Ghani was born on 30 October 1956 at Abbottabad. He obtained a bachelor of arts degree of from Punjab University and E.F.L. from UK.

== Political career ==
He contested the 1997 North-West Frontier Province provincial election as a candidate of the Pakistan Tehreek-e-Insaf (PTI) from PF-34 Abbottabad-I, but was unsuccessful. He received 4,224 votes and lost to Ali Afzal Khan Jadoon, a candidate of the Pakistan Muslim League (N) (PML(N)).

He was elected to the Provincial Assembly of the North-West Frontier Province as a candidate of the Pakistan Muslim League (Q) (PML(Q)) from PF-44 Abbottabad-I in the 2002 North-West Frontier Province provincial election. He received 13,663 votes and defeated Inayat Ullah Khan Jadoon, a candidate of the PML(N).

He contested the 2008 North-West Frontier Province provincial election as a candidate of the PML(Q) from PF-44 Abbottabad-I, but was unsuccessful. He received 10,675 votes and was defeated by Inayat Ullah Khan Jadoon, a candidate of the PML(N).

He was re-elected to the Provincial Assembly of Khyber Pakhtunkhwa as an independent candidate from PK-44 Abbottabad-I in the 2013 Khyber Pakhtunkhwa provincial election. He received 25,576 votes and defeated Inayat Ullah Khan Jadoon, a candidate of PML(N). Following his successful election, he rejoined the PTI.

On 29 March 2014, he was inducted into the provincial cabinet of Chief Minister Pervez Khattak and was appointed as Provincial Minister of Khyber Pakhtunkhwa for Higher Education. On 23 July 2014, he was given the additional ministerial portfolio of Information and Public Relations where he continued to serve until October 2017.

He was re-elected to the Provincial Assembly of Khyber Pakhtunkhwa as a candidate of the PTI from PK-39 Abbottabad-IV in the 2018 Khyber Pakhtunkhwa provincial election. He received 28,577 votes and defeated Inayat Ullah Khan Jadoon, a candidate of the PML(N).

Following his successful election, the PTI nominated him for the office of Speaker of the Khyber Pakhtunkhwa Assembly. On 15 August, he was elected as Speaker of the Khyber Pakhtunkhwa Assembly. He received 81 votes against his opponent Laiq Muhammad Khan who received 27 votes.
