= Mahmood Khan =

Chief Minister Of Khyber Pakhtunkhwa

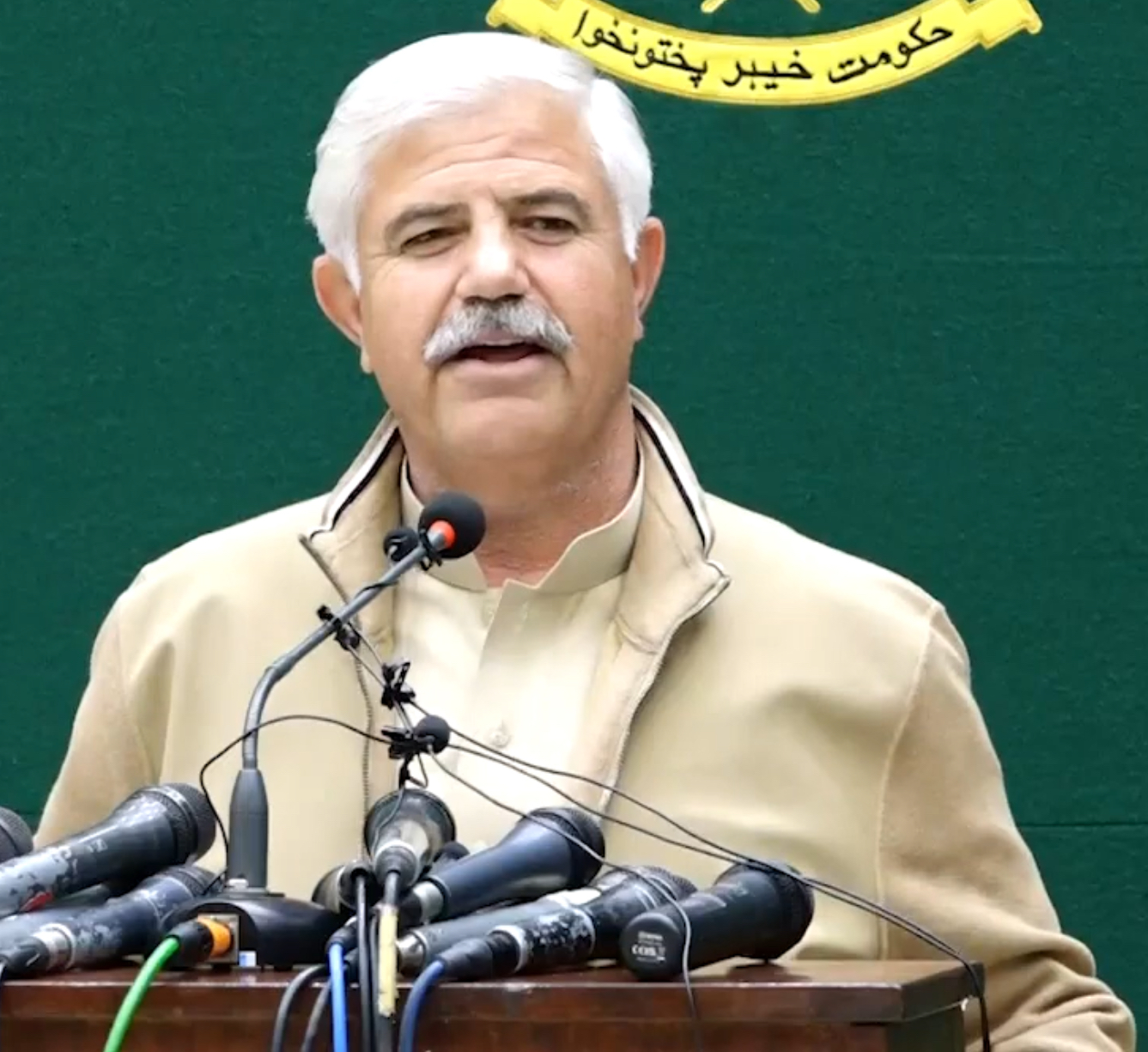
- Mahmood as Chief Minister of Khyber Pakhtunkhwa in January 2023

Chairman of Pakistan Tehreek-e-Insaf – Parliamentarians
- Incumbent
- Assumed office 18 February 2024
- Preceded by: Pervez Khattak

27th Chief Minister of Khyber Pakhtunkhwa
- In office 17 August 2018 – 21 January 2023
- Governor: Shah Farman; Mushtaq Ahmed Ghani (Acting); Haji Ghulam Ali
- Deputy: Atif Khan (2018-20)
- Preceded by: Pervez Khattak; Dost Muhammad Khan ^{(caretaker)}
- Succeeded by: Muhammad Azam Khan ^{(caretaker)} Arshad Hussain Shah ^{(caretaker)} Ali Amin Gandapur

Provincial Minister of Khyber Pakhtunkhwa for Sports, Culture, Tourism and Museums
- In office 29 May 2013 – 28 May 2018
- Chief Minister: Pervez Khattak
- Succeeded by: Atif Khan

Member of the Provincial Assembly of Khyber Pakhtunkhwa
- In office 13 August 2018 – 18 January 2023
- Constituency: PK-9 Swat-VII
- In office 29 May 2013 – 28 May 2018
- Constituency: PK-84 Swat-V

Union Council Nazim
- In office 2005–2012
- Constituency: Matta Kharai, Matta Tehsil

Personal details
- Born: 30 October 1972 (age 54) Matta, Khyber Pakhtunkhwa, Pakistan
- Party: Pakistan Tehreek-e-Insaf – Parliamentarians (2023–present)
- Other political affiliations: PTI (2012–2023); PPP (2005–2012)
- Education: University of Peshawar

Mahmood Khan (Note: Urdu, Pashto: محمود خان) (born 30 October 1972) is a Pakistani politician who was the Chief Minister of Khyber Pakhtunkhwa from August 2018 till January 2023 and is the current chairman of the Pakistan Tehreek-e-Insaf – Parliamentarians (PTI–P). He was prior a member of the Pakistan Tehreek-e-Insaf (PTI). He had been a member of the Provincial Assembly of Khyber Pakhtunkhwa from August 2018 till January 2023, when he, as Chief Minister, dissolved the Assembly. Previously he had been elected a Member of the Provincial Assembly, from May 2013 to May 2018.

In 2012 he became PTI party president of Malakand Division. From 2013 to 2018, he served as a Minister in the cabinet of Chief Minister Pervez Khattak with various portfolios. In 2023 Mahmood Khan left PTI and joined Khattak's breakaway PTI-P, later becoming its chairman in 2024.

== Early life and education ==
He was born on 30 October 1972 in Matta, Swat Pakistan.

He received his early education from Government Primary School Matta and completed his high school education from Peshawar Public School and College. He has a degree of Master of Science (Hons) in Agriculture which he obtained from the University of Peshawar. According to some sources, he obtained his master's degree from the Agricultural University Peshawar.

== Political career ==
According to The Express Tribune and Dawn, Khan was elected as Union Council Nazim of Kharerai, Matta Tehsil in 2005. According to another report by Dawn, he was elected to the same office in 2008 and according to another report by The Express Tribune, he served as Union Council Nazim of Kharerai from 2007 to 2012.

Khan quit Pakistan Peoples Party (PPP) and joined Pakistan Tehreek-e-Insaf (PTI) in 2012.

He was elected to the Provincial Assembly of Khyber Pakhtunkhwa as a candidate of PTI from Constituency PK-84 Swat-V in the 2013 Pakistani general election. He received 11,071 votes and defeated a candidate of Awami National Party. In June 2013, he was inducted into the Khyber Pakhtunkhwa provincial cabinet of Chief Minister Pervez Khattak and was appointed as Provincial Minister of Khyber Pakhtunkhwa for Sports, Culture, Tourism and Museums.

Khan made national news in April 2014, when a social activist Shakil Wahidullah filed a petition against him in the Peshawar High Court alleging him of corruption of Rs 1.8 million during his tenure as Provincial Minister for Sports, Culture, Tourism and Museums. Following which an inquiry was conducted by the Government of Khyber Pakhtunkhwa to probe the matter. The inquiry officer noted that Khan had no role in the matter. It was noted that Rs 1.8 million were transferred from the Directorate of Sports to Khan's personal bank account on his directive. Khan had also acknowledged it but said it had happened due to misunderstanding, While Khan was exonerated by the inquiry officer, saying the handling of financial affairs falls within the jurisdiction of the principal accounts officer and his staff. He was removed from the cabinet and subsequently his ministerial portfolio was withdrawn on the orders of Peshawar High Court, along with suspension of three senior officers of the sports department.

In July 2014, he was re-inducted into the provincial cabinet of Chief Minister Pervez Khattak and appointed as Provincial Minister of Khyber Pakhtunkhwa for Irrigation where he continued to serve until October 2014. In January 2016, he was appointed as Provincial Minister of Khyber Pakhtunkhwa for Home and Tribal Affairs in the Khyber Pakhtunkhwa provincial cabinet of Chief Minister Pervez Khattak. In February 2016, his ministerial portfolio was changed from Home and Tribal Affairs to sports, culture, archaeology, museums and youth affairs where he continued to serve until the dissolution of the provincial assembly on 29 May 2018 upon the completion of the government's five-year term.

== Chief Minister of Khyber Pakhtunkhwa (2018-2023) ==
He was re-elected to the Provincial Assembly of Khyber Pakhtunkhwa as a candidate of PTI from Constituency PK-9 (Swat-VIII) in the 2018 Pakistani general election. He received 25,630 votes and defeated Muhammad Ayub Khan, a candidate of Awami National Party (ANP). PTI acquired a two-thirds majority during the general election in the Provincial Assembly of Khyber Pakhtunkhwa.

Following Khan's successful election, Pervez Khattak recommended his name for the office of the Chief Minister of Khyber Pakhtunkhwa. In August 2018, PTI formally nominated him for the same office. Reportedly, Imran Khan preferred to select Atif Khan for the office of Khyber Pakhtunkhwa Chief Ministership, however had to select Khan due to the strong reservations by Pervez Khattak over the latter's selection. It was noted that his appointment as Khyber Pakhtunkhwa Chief Minister was political and not on merit, and that a tussle between Atif Khan and Pervez Khattak paved his way to become PTI candidate for the slot of Chief Minister.

Khan became Chief Minister as the richest member of the Provincial Assembly of Khyber Pakhtunkhwa. He also became the first person from Malakand Division to be nominated for the position of Khyber Pakhtunkhwa Chief Minister.

On 16 August 2018, he was elected Chief Minister of Khyber Pakhtunkhwa. He received 77 votes against his opponent Mian Nisar Gul who secured 33 votes. The next day, he sworn in as Chief Minister of Khyber Pakhtunkhwa.

=== Cabinet ===
After assuming the office as the Chief Minister, Khan held consultation with Imran Khan and formed an 11-member cabinet. The 11-member cabinet sworn in on 29 August 2018. The second part of his cabinet, consisting of two advisors and two special assistants was sworn in on 13 September 2018 increasing the size of the cabinet to 15. The cabinet included Jamaat-e-Islami and Awami Jamhuri Ittehad Pakistan.

=== Universal Sehat Card Plus ===
The Khyber Pakhtunkhwa government under Mahmood Khan launched the Sehat Card Plus Programme from 1 November 2020 to 14 February 2021, aiming to provide universal health coverage in the province. The initiative resulted in 52,000 receiving free treatment. 400 hospitals were placed under the Sehat Card Plus program. Due to a lack of facilities, 48 hospitals were removed from the program in 2022. The government allocated Rs. 25 billion for the Sehat Card initiative in 2022. By the end of 2022, 7.5 million families were receiving free treatment for curing various diseases and transplants.

In 2022, his government passed the Universal Health Coverage Act, which provided a legal framework for the Sehat Card providing Universal Health Coverage. After the Federal government stopped cashless medication and Sehat Card funding for the newly-merged tribal districts, the KP government announced the inclusion of the merged districts in an interim Sehat Card Plus Programme. In addition to an increase in the tribal areas annual package per family from Rs 720,000 to Rs 1 million, covering costly procedures such as liver and renal transplants. Chief Minister Mehmood Khan criticised the federal government and had written a letter asking it to reconsider.

=== Solarisation and Infrastructure ===
The PTI provincial government completed 265 mini macro-hydel power projects (MMHPPs) in 11 different districts aimed at providing cheaper electricity to people of rural areas of the province. His government also completed eight hydropower projects by September 2021. By October 2022, the Khyber Pakhtunkhwa government had solarized 6,500 mosques, and announced plans to solarize 9,000 more mosques. In 2023, Mehmood Khan announced a Rs36.404 billion project to build Phase II of the Swat Motorway, announced a Rs2 billion Sanam dam, and approved the Chashma Right Bank Canal (CRBC) project to expand self-reliance in wheat production.

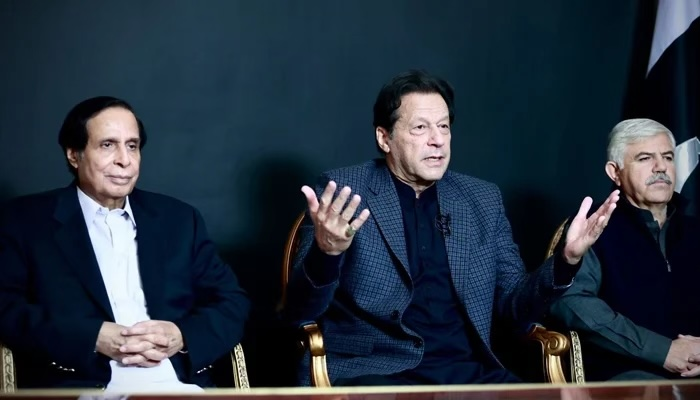
Mahmood (right) alongside Imran Khan (center) and Parvez Elahi (left), announcing the dissolution of the KPK and Punjab assemblies.

=== Dissolution of the 11th Provincial Assembly ===
On 17 January 2023, Khan sent a letter to Governor Haji Ghulam Ali, advising him to dissolve the Provincial Assembly. The Governor accepted the advice the next day, effectively calling snap elections across Khyber Pakhtunkhwa.

He ceased to be Chief Minister on 21 January 2023 after the appointment of Muhammad Azam Khan, a bureaucrat, as the caretaker Chief Minister.

== Personal wealth ==
As of August 2018, Khan declared to own 89 kanals of agricultural land and 150 shops in Swat's Matta Bazaar worth Rs2.516 billion.

== Notes ==
Political offices
Preceded by Dost Muhammad	Chief Minister of Khyber Pakhtunkhwa; 17 August 2018 – 21 January 2023	Succeeded by Azam Khan
