= Provincial Assembly of Khyber Pakhtunkhwa =

Unicameral Legislature of Khyber Pakhtunkhwa

Coordinates: 34°00′50″N 71°33′57″E

Khyber Pakhtunkhwa (KP) Provincial Assembly صوبائی مجلس خیبر پختونخوا (Urdu) د خیبر پښتونخوا ولايتي غونډه (Pashto)
- List of members of the 12th Provincial Assembly of Khyber Pakhtunkhwa

Type
- Type: Unicameral

Leadership
- Speaker: Babar Saleem Swati, PTI since 29 February 2024
- Deputy Speaker: Suraya Bibi, PTI since 29 February 2024
- Chief Minister of Khyber Pakhtunkhwa: Sohail Afridi, PTI since 15 October 2025
- Leader of the Opposition: Ibadullah Khan, PMLN since 4 March 2024

Structure
- Seats
- Political groups: Government (111): SIC (1); Independents (112); JUI-F (18); Opposition (34): PTI-P (3); PPP (10); PML-N (17); ANP (4)

Elections
- Voting system: Mixed member majoritarian: 115 seats elected by FPTP; 26 seats for women, 4 seats for non-Muslims through PR
- Last election: 8 February 2024
- Next election: 2029

Meeting place
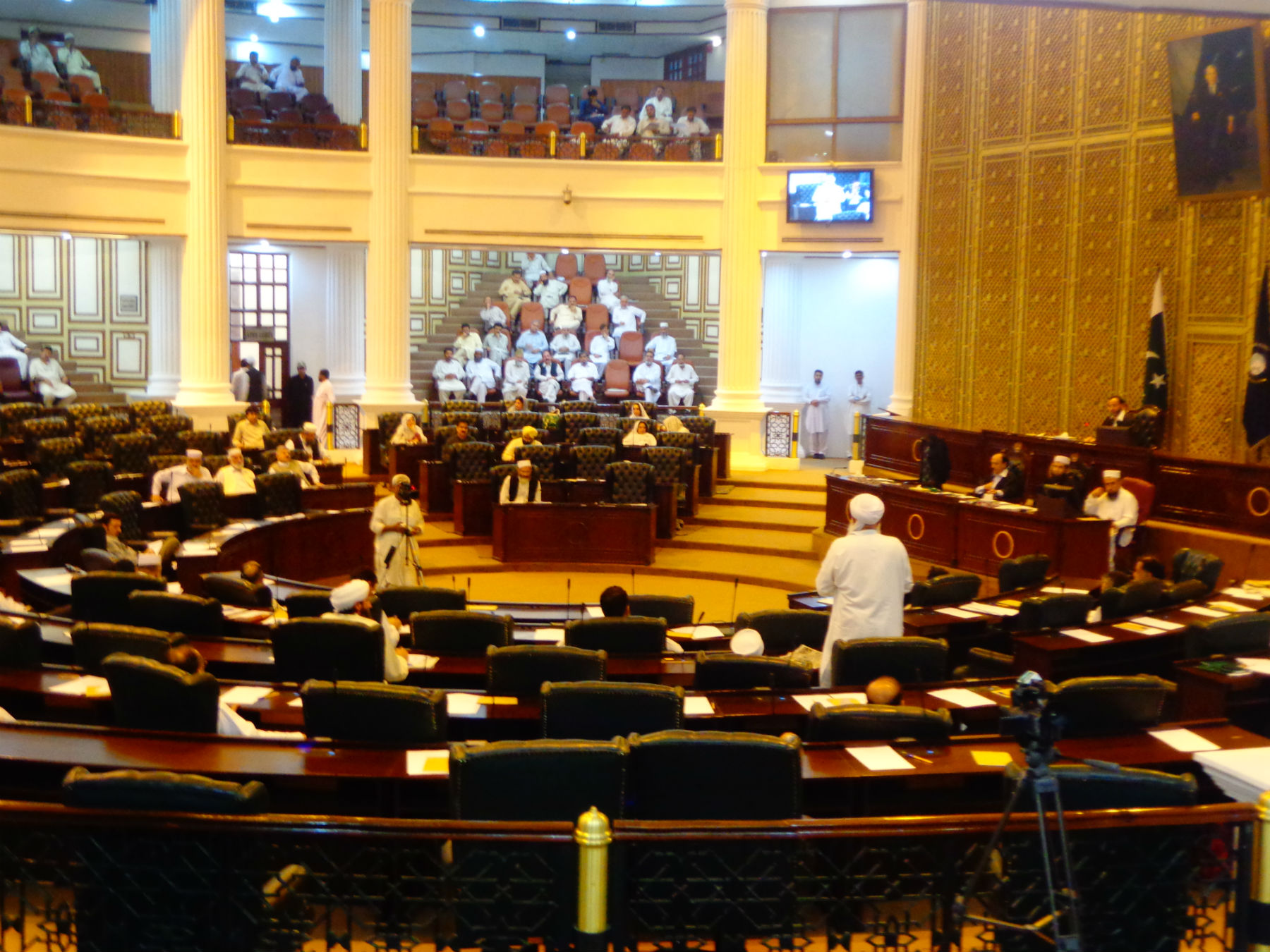
- Provincial Assembly House of Khyber Pakhtunkhwa, Peshawar

Website
- Official website

Constitution
- Constitution of the Islamic Republic of Pakistan

The Provincial Assembly of Khyber Pakhtunkhwa is a unicameral legislature of elected representatives of the Pakistani province of Khyber Pakhtunkhwa, which is located in Peshawar, the provincial capital. It was established under the Article 106 of the Constitution of Pakistan, having a total of 145 seats, with 115 general seats, 26 seats reserved for women and 4 reserved for non-Muslims.

== Introduction ==
The Provincial Assembly of Khyber Pakhtunkhwa is the unicameral legislative body for Pakistan's Khyber Pakhtunkhwa province, located in Peshawar. Established under Article 106 of the Constitution of Pakistan, it legislates on provincial matters including education, health, and local government.

The assembly elects the Chief Minister who leads provincial government and appoints members of provincial cabinet. Under the parliamentary framework of government both chief minister and cabinet are responsible to assembly.

== Composition ==
After Final Delimitation 2018, the composition of Khyber Pakhtunkhwa Assembly seats is as under:

General seats	Reserved for women	Reserved for non-Muslims	Total seats
115	26	4	145

== History ==
The history of the provincial legislature of present-day Khyber Pakhtunkhwa begins during British colonial rule in the Indian subcontinent. Before the British annexed the region, the areas that now form Khyber Pakhtunkhwa were ruled by local tribal systems, the Durrani Empire, and later the Sikh Empire under Maharaja Ranjit Singh. In 1849, after defeating the Sikhs, the British East India Company annexed the region and included it within the Punjab Province of British India.

For many decades, the Pashtun-majority areas were administered directly from Lahore under the Punjab government. The British considered the frontier region strategically important because of its proximity to Afghanistan and the fear of Russian expansion toward India during the "Great Game." As a result, the British introduced a special administrative system with strict frontier laws, military control, and limited political participation.

In 1901, the Viceroy of India, Lord Curzon, separated the north-western districts from Punjab and created the North-West Frontier Province, commonly called NWFP. The new province included Peshawar, Kohat, Bannu, Dera Ismail Khan, and Hazara divisions. At that time, there was no elected provincial assembly. The province was administered by a Chief Commissioner and later a Governor appointed by the British Crown.

Political awareness gradually increased in the province during the early twentieth century. Leaders such as Khan Abdul Ghaffar Khan, also known as Bacha Khan, launched social and political reform movements. His organization, the Khudai Khidmatgar, worked closely with the Indian National Congress and demanded constitutional reforms and greater rights for the people of the frontier.

A major turning point came with the Government of India Act 1935. Under this law, NWFP was granted provincial autonomy and an elected legislative assembly for the first time. Elections were held in 1937, leading to the formation of the first provincial ministry. The Congress Party, supported by Bacha Khan's movement, formed the government under Dr. Khan Sahib, elder brother of Abdul Ghaffar Khan. This was effectively the beginning of the provincial assembly tradition in the province.

During the 1940s, political tensions increased over the future of India. The All-India Muslim League under Muhammad Ali Jinnah gained popularity in the province. In the 1946 elections, the Congress again formed the provincial government, but the Muslim League intensified its campaign for Pakistan.

In 1947, before the partition of British India, the British held the North-West Frontier Province referendum 1947 to determine whether the province would join Pakistan or India. The Congress and Khudai Khidmatgar movement boycotted the referendum because the option of independence was not included. Most voters who participated voted in favor of joining Pakistan. Consequently, NWFP became part of Pakistan on 14 August 1947.

Following the declaration of One Unit on 3 October 1955, the country was divided into two provinces, West Pakistan and East Pakistan and the Legislative Assembly Building was declared as Peshawar High Court.

After the dissolution of West Pakistan in 1970, was restored. The legislative Assembly was restored as a Provincial Assembly through a presidential order known as legal framework order 1970. After the restoration of the Provincial Assembly in 1970, General Elections were held for Khyber Pakhtunkhwa Provincial Assembly on 17 December 1970. At that time the number of member's seats in the Assembly was 43 out of which 2 seats were reserved for women (Constituency WR-06) and only one for minorities. The first session of the Assembly was summoned on 2 May 1972 in the hall of Pakistan Academy for Rural Development, University Town Peshawar. Muhammad Aslam Khan Khattak was elected as Speaker and Arbab Saifur Rehman Khan as Deputy Speaker on 2 May 1972, and opposition leader Mufti Mahmud was elected Chief Minister as part of an alliance between his party the Jamiat Ulema-e-Islam and the National Awami Party (Wali). His government collectively resigned in protest against the dismissal of the Balochistan provincial government. After some political wrangling a minority government was formed by the Pakistan Peoples Party under Sardar Inayatullah Khan Gandapur, he was subsequently replaced by Nasrullah Khan Khattak. The provincial elections in 1977 were boycotted by the opposition Pakistan National Alliance, a short-lived government was formed under Chief Minister Muhammad Iqbal Khan Jadoon.On 5 July 1977 Martial Law was declared and the Provincial Assembly was dissolved.

The 1985 non-party elections brought Arbab Jehangir Khan as Chief Minister, but the assembly was dismissed in 1988 by President Zia-ul-Haq. The 1988 elections, the first after Zia's death, were won by the PPP and ANP alliance, with Aftab Ahmad Khan Sherpao becoming CM. That assembly lasted only two years before being dissolved in 1990. The 1990 elections saw IJI (Islami Jamhoori Ittehad) win, and Sabir Shah of PML-N became CM, but again the assembly was dismissed in 1993 under governor's rule. The 1993 elections brought a PPP-PML coalition, with Aftab Sherpao returning as CM, but he was removed in 1996 after President Farooq Leghari dismissed the provincial government on corruption charges. The 1997 elections gave a landslide to PML-N, with Sardar Mehtab Ahmed Khan as CM, but the Musharraf coup of 1999 dissolved all assemblies once more.

After a four-year gap, the 2002 elections under Musharraf's legal framework saw MMA (Muttahida Majlis-e-Amal), a religious parties' alliance, win a surprising majority in KPK. Akram Khan Durrani of JUI-F became CM, the first religious leader to hold that post. His government completed its full five-year term.

The 2008 elections saw ANP win, with Amir Haider Khan Hoti as CM, focusing on peace and anti-militancy operations. One of the landmark achievements of this term was the passage of a resolution to change the province's name from NWFP to Khyber Pakhtunkhwa, which was formalized in 2010.

In the 2013 election, Pakistan Tehreek-e-Insaf (PTI) won its first-ever provincial government anywhere in Pakistan, with Pervez Khattak being elected as CM. This assembly also served a full term. The 2018 election was historic because the Federally Administered Tribal Areas (FATA) were merged into KPK, raising the assembly size from 124 to 145 seats (115 general, 26 women, 4 non-Muslim). PTI again won a majority, with Mahmood Khan as CM. The assembly was dissolved early in January 2023 by PTI (on orders from party chief Imran Khan to force snap national elections). After a caretaker government, the 2024 elections were held in February. PTI-backed independent candidates (running without a party symbol due to a Supreme Court ruling) won the most seats and Ali Amin Gandapur (PTI-backed) becoming Chief Minister.

=== Qualification of members ===
According to Article 113 of the Constitution, the qualifications for membership in the National Assembly set forth in Article 62 of the Constitution also apply for membership to the Provincial Assembly. Thus, a member of the Provincial Assembly:

1. must be a citizen of Khyber-Pakhtunkhwa;
2. must be at least twenty-five years of age and must be enrolled as a voter in any electoral roll in–
  1. any part of Khyber-Pakhtunkhwa, for election to a general seat or a seat reserved for non-Muslims; and
  2. any area in Khyber-Pakhtunkhwa from which the member seeks membership for election to a seat reserved for women.
3. must be of good character and not commonly known as one who violates Islamic injunctions;
4. must have adequate knowledge of Islamic teachings and practices obligatory duties prescribed by Islam as well as abstains from major sins;
5. must be sagacious, righteous, non-profligate, and honest;
6. must have never been convicted for a crime involving moral turpitude or for giving false evidence;
7. must have never, after the establishment of Pakistan, worked against the integrity of the country or opposed the ideology of Pakistan.

The disqualifications specified in paragraphs 3 and 4 do not apply to a person who is a non-Muslim, but such a person must have good moral reputation and possess other qualifications prescribed by an act of Parliament.

=== Disqualification of members ===
The criteria for disqualification of members of a Provincial Assembly is established by Articles 63, 63A, 113 and 127. A person shall be disqualified from being elected or chosen as, and from being, a member of the Provincial Assembly if the member:

1. is of unsound mind and has been so declared by a competent court; or
2. is an undischarged insolvent; or
3. ceases to be a citizen of Khyber-Pakhtunkhwa, Pakistan or acquires the citizenship of a foreign State; or
4. holds an office of profit in the service of Pakistan other than an office declared by law not to disqualify its holder; or
5. is in the service of any statutory body of any body which is owned or controlled by the Government or in which the Government has a controlling share or interest; or
6. is propagating any opinion, or acting in any manner, prejudicial to the Ideology of Pakistan, or the sovereignty, integrity or security of Pakistan, or morality, or the maintenance of public order, or the integrity or independence of the judiciary of Pakistan, or which defames or brings into ridicule the judiciary or the Armed Forces of Pakistan; or
7. has been convicted by a court of competent jurisdiction on a charge of corrupt practice, moral turpitude or misuse of power or authority under any law for the time being in force; or
8. he has been dismissed from the service of Pakistan or service of a corporation or office set up or controlled by the Provincial Government or a Local Government on the grounds of misconduct or moral turpitude; or
9. has been removed or compulsorily retired from the service of Pakistan or service of a corporation or office set up or controlled by the Provincial Government or a Local Government on the grounds of misconduct or moral turpitude; or
10. has been in the service of Pakistan or of any statutory body or any body which is owned or controlled by the Government or in which the Government has a controlling share or interest, unless a period of two years has elapsed since he ceased to be in such service; or
11. is found guilty of a corrupt or illegal practice under any law for the time being in force, unless a period of five years has elapsed from the date on which that order takes effect; or
12. has been convicted under section 7 of the Political Parties Act, 1962 (III of 1962), unless a period of five years has elapsed from the date of such conviction; or
13. whether by himself or by any person or body of persons in trust for him or for his benefit or on his account or as a member of a Hindu undivided family, has any share or interest in a contract, not being a contract between a cooperative society and Government, for the supply of goods to, or for the execution of any contract or for the performance of any service undertaken by, Government.

Article 63A, which deals with disqualification on grounds of defection, was added to the Constitution in 1997. A member of a Parliamentary Party composed of a single political party defects if the member:

1. resigns from membership of the political party or joins another Parliamentary Party; or
2. votes or abstains from voting in the Provincial Assembly contrary to any direction issued by the Parliamentary Party to which the member belongs, in relations to
  1. election of the Chief Minister; or
  2. a vote of confidence or a vote of no-confidence; or
  3. a Money Bill.

=== Privileges of members ===
Article 66 read with Article 127 confers freedom of speech on the members of the Provincial Assembly. No member is liable to any proceedings in any court of law in respect of anything said or any vote given by him in Assembly. Similarly no member is liable in respect of any publication which is published under the authority of Provincial Assembly.

However, Article 114 of the Constitution curtails this privilege and prohibits members from discussing conduct of judges of High Court and Supreme Court in the discharge of their duties.

=== First day proceedings in the Provincial Assembly ===
(a) Oath of Members. – After general elections, elected members in the first meeting take oath in the form set out in Third Schedule of the Constitution. Article 65 read with Article 127 states "A person elected to a House shall not sit or vote until he has made before the House oath in the form set out in the Third Schedule". Those members who have not taken oath in the first meeting take oath when they attend a meeting for the first time. The first meeting is presided by the outgoing Speaker. Article 53 (8) read with Article 127 says "the Speaker shall continue in his office till the person elected to fill the office by next Assembly enters upon his office." (b) Election and oath of Speaker and Deputy Speaker. – In addition to oath taking by the members, Provincial Assembly according to Article 108 to the exclusion of any other business, elect from amongst its members a Speaker and a Deputy Speaker. When office of Speaker or Deputy Speaker becomes vacant, in any way, the Assembly elects another member as Speaker or Deputy Speaker.

The elected Speaker and Deputy Speaker according to clause 2 of Article 53 read with Article 127 take oath before the House in the form set out in the Third Schedule.

=== Summoning and prorogation of Provincial Assemblies ===
Article 109 authorizes the Governor of the Province to summon Provincial Assembly to meet at such time and place as he thinks fit. Where the Governor summons Assembly he is authorized to prorogue it too. In addition, the Speaker, on a requisition signed by not less than one-fourth of the total membership of the Provincial Assembly, can summon it, at such time and place as he thinks fit, within fourteen days of the receipt of the requisition. Article 54(3) read with Article 127 also empowers the Speaker to prorogue the session where he summons it.

=== Number of sessions and days during a year ===
Article 54 (2) and (3) read with article 127 say there are at least three sessions of Provincial Assembly every year, with not more than 120 days intervening between the last sitting of the Assembly in one session and the date appointed for its first sitting in the next session. While clause 'g' of Article 127 read with Proviso to Article 54 provides that Provincial Assembly shall meet for not less than 70 working days in each year.

=== Duration of Provincial Assembly ===
The term of Provincial Assembly in Pakistan according to Article 107 is five years unless it is sooner dissolved, from the day of its first meeting and stands dissolved at the expiration of its terms.

=== Other methods of dissolution of Provincial Assembly ===
(a) Dissolution of Provincial Assembly on the advice by the Chief Minister. – Under Article 112, clause 1, the Governor of a Province is empowered to dissolve Provincial Assembly if so advised by the Chief Minister. Where the Chief Minister so advises, the Provincial Assembly stands dissolved at the expiration of 48 hours. (b) Dissolution of Provincial Assembly by the Governor on the approval by the President. – Clause 2 of the same Article again empowers the Governor to dissolve Provincial Assembly subject to the approval of the President, where he is of the opinion, that after having been passed a vote of no confidence against the Chief Minister, there is no other member of the Provincial Assembly to command the confidence of the majority of the members of the Provincial Assembly, in a session of the Provincial Assembly summoned for the purpose.

=== Executive Authority of a province ===
Executive Authority is exercised by the Governor and under Article 105, he shall act in accordance with advice of the cabinet or the Chief Minister.

=== Appointment and ascertainment of Chief Minister ===
According to clause 2-A of Article 130, the Governor of a Province invites the member of the Provincial Assembly to be the Chief Minister who commands the confidence of the majority of the members of the Provincial Assembly as ascertained in the session of the Assembly summoned for the purpose in accordance with the provisions of the constitution.

=== Powers and functions of Provincial Assembly ===
There are three major functions or powers of a Provincial Assembly:

1. To make laws (Article 141 and 142 of the Constitution of Pakistan)
2. To manage the purse of the province (Article 123 (3))
3. To keep checks on the policies and practices of the Government (Article 130)

=== Limitations ===
One of the major functions of the Provincial Assembly is to make laws as provided in Article 141 and 142 of the Constitution for conferring of functions upon officers or authorities subordinate to the Provincial Governments, Constitutionally. This function is subject to some limitations.

1. Under Article 142, a Provincial Assembly cannot legislate when an emergency is declared in the country.
2. A Provincial Assembly cannot make law which is against fundamental rights.
3. Principles of policy or rule of law should be the base of each law.
4. A law cannot be enacted if it is not in conformity with the injunctions of Islam.
5. Under Article 142, the Provincial Assembly cannot legislate on matters which fall in the Federal Legislative List.

=== Residuary List ===
The Provincial Assembly has exclusive powers to make law with respect to any matter not enumerated in the Federal Legislative List. Residuary matters are exclusively within Provincial autonomy. From the above, it cannot be extracted that the Province is subordinate to the Federation or Federation is subordinate to Province. In fact, legislative powers are distributed between Federation and Provinces via Article 142. And one institution cannot take over powers of other institution. However, this provincial law making power comes to an end and shifts to the Federation during emergency when declared vide Articles 232, 233 or 234.

== List of Assemblies ==
Order	Date of first session	Date of dissolution
First Assembly	2 May 1972	13 January 1977
Second Assembly	6 April 1977	5 July 1977
Third Assembly	12 March 1985	30 May 1988
Fourth Assembly	2 December 1988	6 August 1990
Fifth Assembly	5 November 1990	30 May 1993
Sixth Assembly	18 October 1993	12 November 1997
Seventh Assembly	19 February 1997	12 October 1999
Eighth Assembly	27 November 2002	10 October 2007
Ninth Assembly	20 March 2008	19 March 2013
Tenth Assembly	30 May 2013	28 May 2018
Eleventh Assembly	13 August 2018	18 January 2023
Twelfth Assembly	28 February 2024	11 October 2026

== Manager of purse of Khyber-Pukhtunkhwa ==
The second important function of the Provincial Assembly of Khyber Pakhtunkhwa under Article 123 (3) is that it acts as a manager or custodian of the purse of Khyber-Pukhtunkhwa.

== Provincial Consolidated Fund ==
No expenditure from the Provincial Consolidated Fund is deemed to be duly authorised unless it is specified in the schedule so authenticated and is laid before the Provincial Assembly. Provincial Assembly exercises checks over executive through control over the Finance. Article 119 provides custody and withdrawal of money from Provincial Consolidated Fund, (defined in Article 118) and public accounts of a Province, unless it is regulated by the Act of the Provincial Assembly.

=== Annual and supplementary Budget statement ===
Provisions given under Article 120 dealing with annual budget statement and Article 124 dealing with supplementary budget or excess grant become effective, when it is approved by the Provincial Assembly.

=== Approval of budgets ===
Article 122(2) and Article 124 authorise Provincial Assembly to approve or refuse any demand and reduce the amount specified in the demand. Once budget is approved, the Government has no right to deviate from these sanctions. For excess expenditure, Government has to seek regularization from the Assembly. Similarly under Article 88 read with Article 127, accounts and audit reports of the Government are further scrutinized by the public accounts Committee of the Assembly.

=== To keep checks on the policies and practices of the Government ===
The significance of Provincial Assembly is that it is a representative institution and keeps checks upon policies, practices and performance of the Government. Article 130 (4) says that the Cabinet shall be collectively responsible to the Provincial Assembly.

== Devices of accountability ==
Issues relating to Public interest are raised by the Members for discussion in the House in the form of questions, adjournment motions, call attention notices, general discussion, resolutions and various Reports.

The Members make the Executive accountable to the legislature through these devices according to the Rules of Procedure of the Provincial Assembly of Khyber-Pukhtunkhwa, 1997.

== Members Support Programme ==
This programme is meant to serve Members of the Provincial Assembly in different areas. They are provided legislative help in drafting private members bills. They are provided useful and informative books. An Internet facility is also available to them, and through Internet research they can polish their ideas.

To provide these facilities to the Members, in 1997 the Research and Reference Division was formed. It was established to provide information to the Members when needed, and to collect up-to-date information from the resources available. The Library and Computer Sections were included in this division. It was also meant to provide help to the representatives in legislative procedures, such as the drafting of a bill. Prior to the establishment of the Research and Reference Wing, this service was performed by the Legislation Branch. Salman Said

== Automation Section and Library Section ==
The primary function of Library Section is to provide data to the Members and to the Research Section. Information such as the Assembly's agenda, date of next sitting, schedule of committee meetings and information about Members is available due to installation of the latest PBX. The Assembly Secretariat has stored vital information in the computer and it is accessible from anywhere around the clock.

Moreover, Research and Reference Division has designed a web page to provide information to the Members about the Assembly Secretariat and proceedings of the Assembly including its schedule and agenda, and a summary of its proceedings. This web page also includes the procedural rules for the Provincial Assembly of Khyber-Pukhtunkhwa and some other important laws of the country.

== Elections ==
1970 Elections

Party	Elected	Reserved	Total
National Awami Party (Wali)	13		
Pakistan Muslim League-Qayyum	11		
Jamiat Ulema-e-Islam-West Pakistan	4		
Pakistan People's Party	3		
Pakistan Muslim League-Conv	2		
Jamaat-e-Islami	1		
Independents	6		
Total	40	3	43

1977 Elections

Party	Elected	Reserved	Total
Pakistan People's Party	60		
Pakistan Muslim League-Qayyum	2		
Others	11		
Independents	4		
Total	77		

1985 Elections

The 1985 elections were held on a non-party basis

Party	Elected	Reserved	Total
Non-Party Elections	80	7	87
Total	80	7	87

1988 Elections

Party	Elected	Reserved	Total
Islami Jamhoori Ittehad	28		
Pakistan People's Party	21		
Awami National Party	13		
Jamiat Ulema-e-Islam	2		
Independents	16		
Total	80	7	87

1990 Elections

Party	Elected	Reserved	Total
Islami Jamhoori Ittehad	33		
Awami National Party	23		
Pakistan Democratic Alliance (PDA)	6		
Jamiat Ulema-e-Islam	2		
Independents	16		
Total	80	7	87

1993 Elections

Party	Elected	Reserved	Total
Pakistan People's Party	22		
Awami National Party	21		
Pakistan Muslim League (N)	15		
Pakistan Muslim League (J)	4		
Pakistan Islamic Front	4		
Muttahida Deeni Mahaz	1		
Islami Jamhoori Mahaz	1		
Independents	12		
Total	80	3	83

1997 Elections

Pakistan Muslim League (N) and Awami National Party emerged as the largest Political Parties in the 1997 Elections.

Party	Elected	Reserved	Total
Pakistan Muslim League (N)	32		
Awami National Party	30		
Pakistan People's Party	4		
Pakistan Muslim League (J)	2		
Jamiat Ulema-e-Islam	1		
Independents	11		
Total	80	3	83

2002 Elections

In the 2002 elections, Muttahida Majlis-e-Amal had won 48 of the seats,PPP (S) 9,PPP parliamentarians 8,ANP 8 seats.

Party	Elected	Reserved	Total
Muttahida Majlis-e-Amal	48	15	63
Pakistan People's Party (S)	9	3	12
Awami National Party	8	2	10
Pakistan People's Party Parliamentarians	8	2	10
Pakistan Muslim League (Q)	6	2	8
Pakistan Muslim League (N)	5	1	6
Pakistan Tehreek-e-Insaf	1	-	1
Independents	14	-	14
Total	99	25	124

2008 Elections

The elections of 2008 resulted in the Awami National Party and Pakistan Peoples Party emerging as the two largest parties at the expense of the conservative Muttahida Majlis-i-Amal.

Party	Elected	Reserved	Total
Awami National Party	39	10	49
Pakistan Peoples Party	16	4	20
Muttahida Majlis-e-Amal	11	3	14
Pakistan Muslim League (N)	6	1	7
Pakistan Muslim League (Q)	5	1	6
Pakistan Peoples Party (Sherpao)	5	1	6
Others	26	7	33
Total	99	25	124

2013 Elections

The elections of 2013 resulted in the Pakistan Tehreek-e-Insaf emerging as the largest party in the province. The Assembly was dissolved on 28 May 2018 after completing a 5-year term.

Party	Elected	Reserved	Total
Pakistan Tehreek-e-Insaf	51	12	63
Jamiat Ulema-e-Islam (F)	12	4	16
Pakistan Muslim League (N)	12	4	16
Qaumi Watan Party	8	2	10
Jamaat-e-Islami	7	1	8
Awami National Party	4	1	5
Pakistan People’s Party	5	1	6
Total	99	25	124

2018 Elections

The elections of 2018 resulted in the Pakistan Tehreek-e-Insaf emerging as the largest party in the province.

Party	Elected	Reserved	Total
Pakistan Tehreek-e-Insaf	66	18	84
Muttahida Majlis-e-Amal	10	3	13
Awami National Party	7	2	9
Pakistan Muslim League (N)	5	1	6
Pakistan People’s Party	4	1	5
Independent	3	-	3
Pakistan Muslim League	1	-	1
Election Postponed	3	-	3
Total	99	25	124

Election was postponed at two constituencies – PK-78 Peshawar and PK-99 Dera Ismail Khan. Election results are withheld in one constituency – PK-23 Shangla – where the number of women voters was less than 10 per cent of the total votes.

2019 Elections

After Merger of FATA in Khyber Pakhtunkhwa in 2017. Elections was held across the merged tribal districts on 20 July 2019. 285 candidates ran for elections on 16 general seats of tribal districts. With addition to 16 general seats 4 seats will be reserved for women and 1 for Non-Muslim, increasing the number of assembly seats from 124 to 145. Unofficial results showed that independents won 6, the Pakistan Tehreek-e-Insaf won 5, JUI-F 3, JI and ANP won one each.

2024 Elections

The Elections of 2024 resulted in PTI-backed Independents getting a 2/3 majority in the provincial assembly; most of them joined the Sunni Itehad Council (SIC) in order to get reserved seats for women and minorities.

Party	Elected	Reserved	Total
SIC	58	0	58
Pakistan Muslim League (N)	8	10	18
Jamiat Ulema-e-Islam (F)	7	11	18
Pakistan People's Party	4	6	10
Pakistan Tehreek-e-Insaf Parliamentarians	2	1	3
Awami National Party	2	2	4
Independents	34	0	34
Total	115	30	145

After a controversial decision by the Election Commission of Pakistan, the PTI was not allotted reserved seats for woman and minorities and the seats which would have been allotted to SIC were distributed to other political parties.

JUI (F) received ten reserved seats from seven general elected seats, PMLN got eight reserved seats from six general seats, PPPP got six reserved seats from four general elected seats, while ANP was allotted one reserved seat. Later on the order of Supreme court of Pakistan, the additional reserved seats given were suspended till the decision of the case filed by PTI.

== Notable members ==
- Jameel Khan Chamakni

== See also ==
- Government of Khyber Pakhtunkhwa
- Government of Pakistan
- Constitution of Pakistan
- Parliament of Pakistan
- Senate of Pakistan
- National Assembly of Pakistan
- Elections in Pakistan
- Peshawar
- Provincial Assembly of the Punjab
- Provincial Assembly of Sindh
- Provincial Assembly of Balochistan
