= Afridi provincial government =

Cabinet of Khyber Pakhtunkhwa, (c. 2026–27

Afridi Ministry
- 18th Cabinet of Khyber Pakhtunkhwa

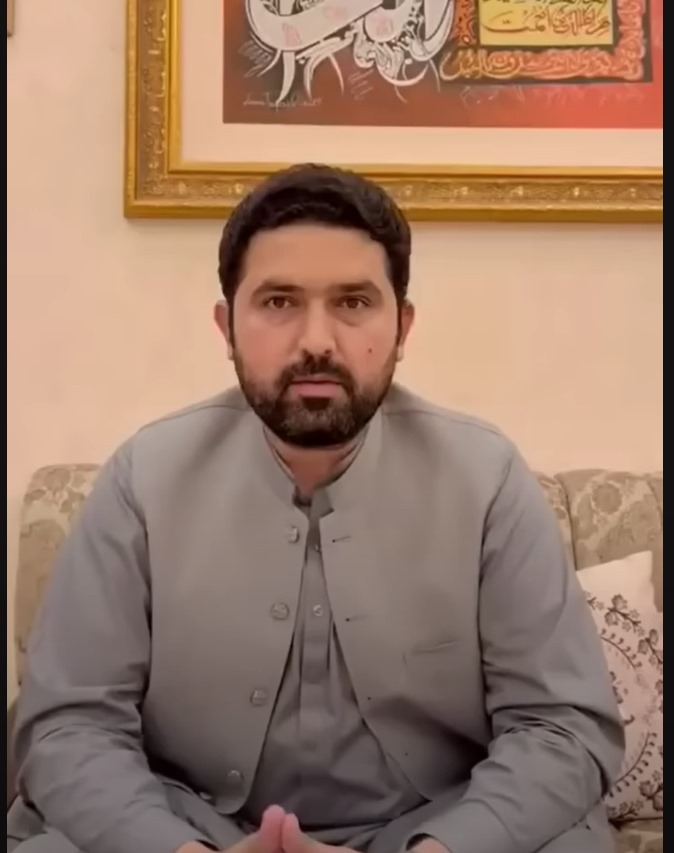
- Date formed: 15 October 2025
- Date dissolved: 11 October 2026

People and organisations
- Head of state: Sohail Afridi
- Governor: Faisal Kundi
- Member party: PTI; PPP; JUI (F)
- Status in legislature: Provincial Assembly of Khyber Pakhtunkhwa 93 / 145 (64%)
- Opposition party: PMLN; PTI-P; ANP
- Opposition leader: Ibadullah Khan

History
- Predecessor: Gandapur provincial government
- Successor: Kundi provincial government

The Afridi ministry was the provincial cabinet of Khyber Pakhtunkhwa, Pakistan, headed by Chief Minister Sohail Afridi of the Pakistan Tehreek-e-Insaf (PTI). The cabinet was dissolved on 11 October 2026 with the imposition of governor's rule by the federal government.

== Inauguration ==
Sohail Afridi was sworn in as the Chief Minister of Khyber Pakhtunkhwa on 15 October 2025. Governor Faisal Kundi administered oath to him.

As Chief Minister, he has taken positions critical of the federal government. He opposed military operations in Khyber Pakhtunkhwa. He also criticized the federal government for the resurgence of militancy in the province, blaming it on "flawed policies of the federal government" and delays in releasing war-on-terror funds and constitutional dues.

== Dismissal ==
On 11 October 2026, Afridi's government was dismissed after KP was put under emergency after recommendations from the PM Shehbaz Sharif's cabinet and approval from the president in light of the long march organized by PTI demanding access to former PM Imran Khan.

Tehreek-i-Tahafuz-Ayin-i-Pakistan (TTAP) leaders requested the Peshawar High Court to declare the proclamation of emergency, issued under Articles 232(1) and 234 of the Constitution, unconstitutional, arguing that the required constitutional conditions had not been met or that the measures exceeded the powers conferred by the Constitution. Petition signatories included opposition leader Mehmood Khan Achakzai, BNP(Mengal) chief Akhtar Mengal, and Sindh United Party President Syed Zainul Abideen, among others.

While questioning the suspension of Article 175(3), the opposition leaders also sought annulment of the notification concerning the deployment of armed forces to the extent where it violated Article 245.

== Members ==
Afridi had sought to meet Imran Khan in Adiala Jail for consultation on the formation of a cabinet. The prison authorities initially rejected the request. In response, Afridi reportedly moved the Islamabad High Court (IHC) just two days after being sworn in. Afridi was prevented from meeting Imran Khan despite an IHC order directing jail authorities to allow such meetings twice a week. His convoy was stopped by the police at the Dahgal checkpoint near the facility. In response, the chief minister staged a brief sit-in outside the jail.

Party
Pakistan Tehreek-e-Insaf (Note: Although Afridi and other governing MPAs are members of the PTI, they are officially listed as independents in assembly records. This is because they contested the previous election as independents due to the PTI intra-party elections case.)

=== Ministers ===
Khyber Pakhtunkhwa Cabinet under Sohail Afridi
Post	Minister	Term
Chief Minister of Khyber Pakhtunkhwa	Sohail Afridi	15 October 2025
Local Government, Elections and Rural Development Higher Education, Archieves and Libraries	Meena Khan	31 October 2025
Elementary and Secondary Education	Arshad Ayub Khan	31 October 2025
Housing	Amjad Ali	31 October 2025
Law, Parliamentry Affairs and Human Rights	Aftab Alam Afridi	31 October 2025
Public Health Engineering	Fazle Shakoor Khan	31 October 2025
Health	Khaliq-ur-Rehman	31 October 2025
Irrigation	Riaz Khan	31 October 2025
Excise, Taxation and Narcotics Control	Syed Fakhr e Jehan	31 October 2025
Relief Rehabilitation and Settlement	Aqibullah Khan	31 October 2025
Labour	Faisal Khan Tarakai	31 October 2025

=== Advisors ===
Portfolio	Name	Term
Finance	Muzzammil Aslam	31 October 2025
Youth Affairs	Taj Muhammad	31 October 2025

=== Special Assistants ===
Portfolios	Name	Term
Information and Public Relations	Shafi Ullah Jan	31 October 2025
