= Ihtisham Ali =

Pakistani politician

Advisor to the Chief Minister of Khyber Pakhtunkhwa for Health
- In office 13 September 2024 – 13 October 2025
- Succeeded by: Syed Fakhr e Jehan

Member of the Provincial Assembly of Khyber Pakhtunkhwa
- Incumbent
- Assumed office 29 February 2024
- Constituency: PK-61 Mardan-VIII

Personal details
- Born: Mardan District, Khyber Pakhtunkhwa, Pakistan
- Party: PTI (2024-present)

Ihtisham Ali is a Pakistani politician and lawyer from Mardan District. He served as Advisor to the Chief Minister of Khyber Pakhtunkhwa, Ali Amin Gandapur for Health. He is also a member of the Pakistan Tehreek-e-Insaf (PTI) and is a member of the Provincial Assembly of Khyber Pakhtunkhwa since 28 February 2024.

== Early life and education ==
Ihtisham Ali was born on 17 January 1984 in the Mardan District of Khyber Pakhtunkhwa. He holds a Master of Arts and Bachelor of Laws Degree and has served as a lawyer.

== Political career ==
He contested the 2015 Khyber Pakhtunkhwa local elections and was elected a district member before becoming a district nazim in 2018.

He contested the 2024 Khyber Pakhtunkhwa provincial elections as a Pakistan Tehreek-e-Insaf/Independent candidate from PK-61 Mardan-VIII. He secured 32,984 votes while the runner-up was Jamshaid Khan of PML-N who secured 20,645 votes. Following his election victory, he was sworn in as a Member of the Provincial Assembly (MPA) on 28 February 2024.

In September 2024, as part of a major cabinet reshuffle in the Gandapur ministry, Provincial Minister of Health, Syed Qasim Ali Shah was handed the Provincial Minister of Social Welfare and Women Empowerment position instead. As part of this, the health portfolio was converted into an advisor role rather than a minister role. Ihsitiham Ali was selected to be Advisor to the Chief Minister of Khyber Pakhtunkhwa, Ali Amin Gandapur for Health on 13 September 2024.
