= Gandapur provincial government =

Cabinet of Khyber Pakhtunkhwa, (c. 2024–25)

Gandapur Ministry
- 17th Cabinet of Khyber Pakhtunkhwa

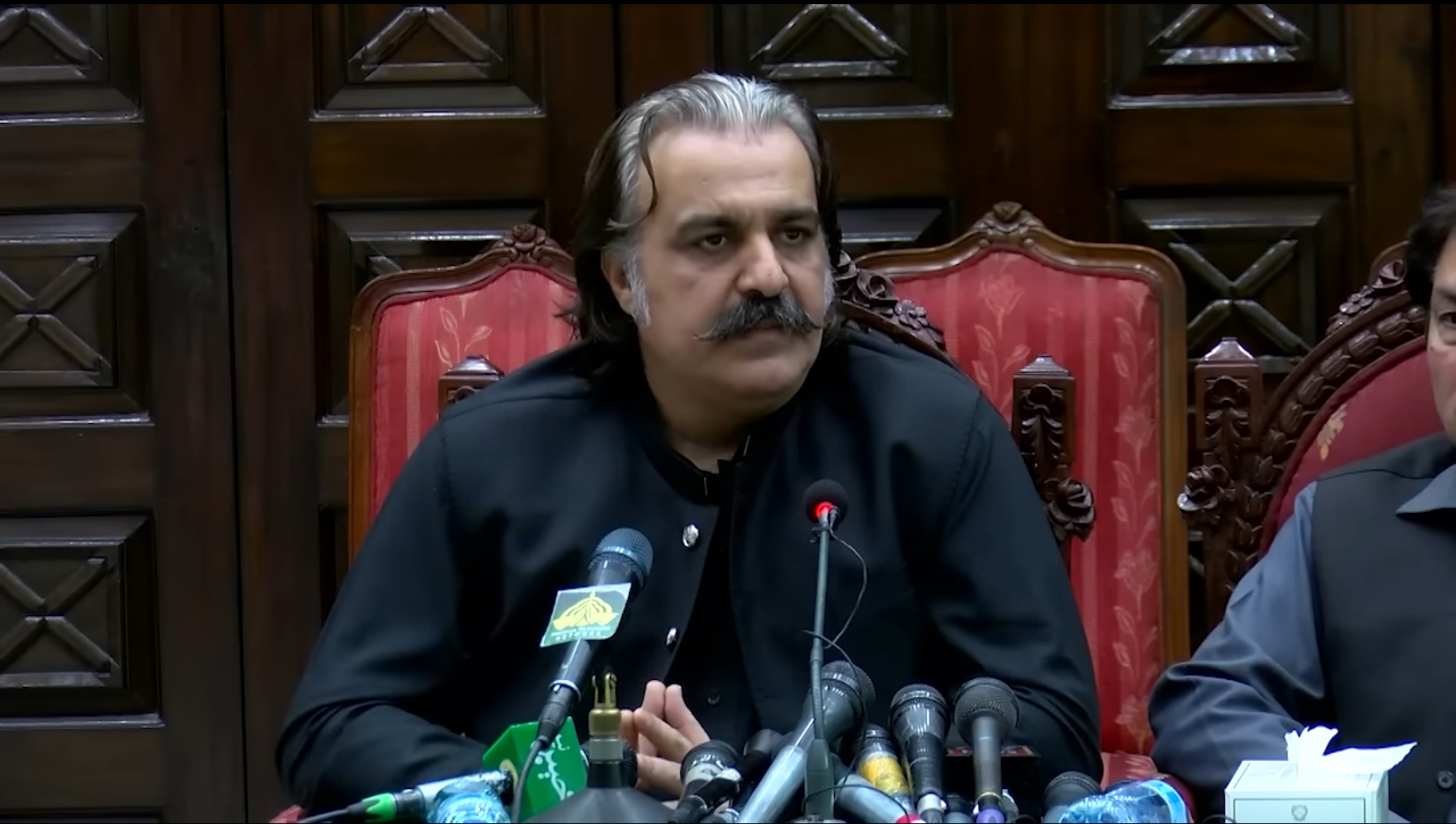
- Date formed: 7 March 2024
- Date dissolved: 8 October 2025

People and organisations
- Head of state: Ali Amin Gandapur
- Governor: Faisal Karim Kundi
- Member party: PTI (Note: Although Gandapur and other governing MPAs are members of the PTI, they are officially listed as independents in assembly records. This is because they contested the previous election as independents due to the PTI intra-party elections case.)
- Status in legislature: Provincial Assembly of Khyber Pakhtunkhwa 92 / 145 (63%)
- Opposition party: PMLN; JUI (F); PPP; PTI-P; ANP; IND
- Opposition leader: Ibadullah Khan

History
- Election: 2024 Khyber Pakhtunkhwa provincial election
- Predecessor: Mahmood Khan provincial government
- Successor: Afridi provincial government

The Gandapur ministry was the governing provincial cabinet of Khyber Pakhtunkhwa, Pakistan, headed by former Chief Minister Ali Amin Gandapur of the Pakistan Tehreek-e-Insaf (PTI). The cabinet stood dissolved with Gandapur's resignation and the subsequent election of Sohail Afridi.

== Inauguration ==
Sardar Ali Amin Gandapur was sworn in as the Chief Minister of Khyber Pakhtunkhwa on 2 March 2024. Governor Haji Ghulam Ali administered oath to him. The inauguration ceremony was held in Peshawar, which was attended by party leaders and workers in large numbers.

As Chief Minister, Ali Amin Gandapur has expressed his determination to restart the process of development in the province. He has prioritized the restoration of Sehat Insaf Card for the welfare of the people. He has also emphasized the importance of law and order and said that the establishment of lasting peace is his first priority. Gandapur has expressed its determination to make the province attractive to foreign investors. He has also promised to talk to the federal government to protect the rights of the province.

== Major decisions ==
=== Budget ===
The total budget for the fiscal year 2024-25 was unveiled by cabinet minister Aftab Alam Afridi and is estimated at Rs 1,754 billion, with a surplus of Rs100 billion. With a total outlay of Rs1.7 trillion, it was described as a “smart surplus budget” by The Express Tribune. It also proposed a 10% increase in salaries and pensions for employees, and hiking the minimum wage from Rs32000 to Rs36000. It prioritized healthcare and education allocations, while implementing reforms to expand its tax and non-tax revenues. It also aimed to create expansionary measures to increase its revenue with a surplus of Rs100 billion in line with the PTI’s election manifesto. The government unveiled the Rs416.3 billion Annual Development Plan (ADP) for 2024-25, an increase of 38% over the previous caretakers government’s Rs301bn.

=== Initiatives ===
The government has announced the KP Solar Scheme, a project to deliver free solar panels to 130,000 citizens in Khyber Pakhtunkhwa. The government also launched the Taleem Card (Education Card) initiative starting in Upper Chitral, aimed at enabling students from backward areas to access quality education. Alongside this, the electronic Jaidad Card (Property Card) was also announced aiming for land reforms in the province. In April 2024, the government announced the decision to undertake the construction of the Tank Zam Dam aiming to irrigate 100,000 acres of land. The Drug Free Peshawar campaign was launched under which 2,397 drug addicts were rehabilitated with 2,000 more planned in Peshawar. The Billion Tree Plus project was also announced, which plans to increase forest cover by 12%. The government initiated three new welfare programs, granting soft and interest-free loans to youth aiming to decrease unemployment, the Ehsaas Rozgar Programme, Ehsaas Naujawan Programme and Ehsaas Hunar Programme. The Ehsaas Apna Ghar scheme was also launched granting interest-free loans for individuals to construct their homes. The Ikhtiyar Awam Ka digital app was also launched, which aims to promote good governance by addressing public grievances and issues of citizens.

Within the first 10 days in office, the government restored medical facilities under the Sehat Insaf Card after it had been suspended for almost a year. The government announced a social protection life insurance facility to be added into the Sehat Insaf Card's Plus Program, offering compensation of Rs500,000 to Rs1,000,000 to the heirs of deceased family heads. Free Outpatient Department (OPD) services were also announced to be covered in the Sehat Card's Plus program.

56 small dams were built in Khyber Pakhtunkhwa by July 2024, at a cost of Rs26.7 billion, and a storage capacity of 281,410 acre feet. 30 more dams were also reported to be in construction by the Irrigation Department. The government's flagship projects include the establishment of the province’s Islamic Takaful insurance company and a home-stay tourism scheme. Other approved projects include the construction of the 365-kilometre Peshawar-Dera Ismail Khan Motorway and a 120-kilometre-long transmission line.. The government also plans to establish a trade corridor hub at Torkham and a debt management fund to strengthen financial stability. The provincial government aims to complete these initiatives by the end of 2027.

In August 2024, a new TransPeshawar route from Peshawar to Pabbi, Nowshera was inaugurated.

== Members ==
=== Ministers ===
The Gandapur ministry cabinet saw a relative reshuffle in the middle of 2024 when Fazal Hakim was assigned different portfolios and Shakeel Ahmad resigned.

PTI

Khyber Pakhtunkhwa Cabinet under Ali Amin Gandapur
Post	Minister	Term
Chief Minister of Khyber Pakhtunkhwa	Ali Amin Gandapur	2 March 2024
Minister of Local Government, Elections and Rural Development	Arshad Ayub Khan	7 March 2024
Minister of Auqaf, Hajj & Religious Affairs	Muhammad Adnan Qadri	7 March 2024
Minister of Livestock, Fisheries & Cooperative	Fazal Hakim	25 July 2024
Minister of Social Welfare and Women Empowerment	Syed Qasim Ali Shah	11 September 2024
Minister of Law, Parliamentary Affairs & Human Rights	Aftab Alam Afridi	7 March 2024
Minister of Irrigation	Fateh-ul-Mulk Ali Nasir	10 September 2025
Minister of Excise, Taxation & Narcotics Control	Khaliq-ur-Rehman	7 March 2024
Minister of Public Health Engineering	Pakhtoon Yar Khan	7 March 2024
Minister of Revenue & Estate	Nazir Ahmed Abbasi	7 March 2024
Minister of Higher Education, Archives and Libraries	Meena Khan	7 March 2024
Minister of Elementary & Secondary Education	Malik Adeel Iqbal	10 September 2025
Minister of Agriculture	Muhammad Sajjad	7 March 2024
Minister of Labour	Fazle Shakoor Khan	7 March 2024
Minister of Food	Muhammad Zahir Shah	7 March 2024
Former Members / Positions in the Cabinet
Minister of Climate Change, Forestry, Environment and Wildlife	Fazal Hakim (Note: Fazal Hakim was reshuffled in July 2024 to Minister of Livestock, Fisheries & Cooperative. This position is currently vacant)	7 March 2024 to 25 July 2024
Minister of Communication & Works	Shakeel Ahmad (Note: Shakeel Ahmad resigned in August 2024, position is currently vacant.)	7 March 2024 to 16 August 2024
Minister of Health	Syed Qasim Ali Shah (Note: Syed Qasim Ali Shah was reshuffled in September 2024 to Minister of Social Welfare and Women Empowerment. The health portfolio is currently an advisory portfolio which is held with Advisor Ihtisham Ali)	7 March 2024 to 11 September 2024

=== Advisors ===
S.No	Name	Portfolios	Term
1	Syed Fakhr e Jehan	Sports & Youth Affairs	7 March 2024
2	Muzzammil Aslam	Finance	7 March 2024
3	Muhammad Ali Saif	Information & Public Relations	7 March 2024
4	Zahid Chanzeb	Culture, Tourism, Archeology and Museums	7 March 2024
5	Ihtisham Ali	Health	13 September 2024
6	Shah Farman	Political Affairs	9 October 2024
Former Advisors
7	Mashal Yousafzai	Zakat, Ushr, Social Welfare and Women Empowerment	7 March 2024 to 11 September 2024

=== Special Assistants ===
S.No	Name	Portfolios	Term
1	Abdul Karim	Industries, Commerce and Technical Education	7 March 2024
2	Liaqat Ali Khan	Population Welfare	7 March 2024
3	Amjad Ali	Housing	7 March 2024
4	Muhammad Sohail Afridi	Communication & Works	13 September 2024
5	Muhammad Musaddiq Abbassi	Anti-Corruption	22 May 2024
6	Musavir Khan	Climate Change, Forestry, Environment & Wildlife	13 September 2024
7	Nek Muhammad Khan	Relief, Rehabilitation & Settlement	13 September 2024
8	Humayun Khan	Prisons	13 September 2024
9	Zarshad Khan	Advisor	10 September 2025
Former Special Assistants
10	Khalid Latif Khan	Science & Technology and Information Technology	7 March 2024 to 3 May 2024

== Allegations of corruption ==
On 3 August 2024, founder of the ruling Pakistan Tehreek-e-Insaf (PTI), Imran Khan warned ministers in the Gandapur ministry of being held accountable for “corruption and governance issues in their departments.”

Shakeel Khan, who served as the Communication and Works Minister under the Gandapur ministry, has accused his department’s secretary of releasing Rs6.87 billion to contractors without his knowledge or consent. He claimed that the funds were disbursed between May and June 2024, under the supervision of Chief Minister Ali Amin Gandapur. Khan further alleged that the secretary admitted to taking a 10-20% commission on the funds, which included payments of Rs200 million to Gandapur and Rs100 million to influential circles, all on Gandapur’s orders. Additionally, Khan claimed that the secretary offered him a bribe of Rs30 million, later increased to Rs50 million, along with a new car, in exchange for his silence, but he refused and claimed he chose to expose the corruption instead. He later stated that his resignation was due to Gandapur's government backing down from its anti-establishment stance, while the government's accountability panel denotified him on the orders of Imran Khan.

In response to the allegations, the Pakistan Tehreek-e-Insaf (PTI) formed a three-member committee to watch over Gandapur’s government. Imran Khan, PTI founder gave Gandapur a 45-day deadline to end corruption in January 2025 after a report uncovered financial corruption by officials in departments.

=== Kohistan scandal ===
On April 30, 2025, the National Accountability Bureau (NAB) said it discovered a “scam” in the KP government, where Rs 40bn was misappropriated over a period of 5 years, despite an annual development budget of Rs 500mil–1.5bn to Upper Kohistan District. The agency said the funds were withdrawn from a provincial account titled ‘Security and Deposit Works KP 10113’, it said it identified 1,000 fake cheques and 50 account holders from the district government. According to Geo News, the “scandal exposes not only serious flaws in KP’s provincial financial system but also hints at deliberate sabotage. Evidence suggests the involvement of rogue officials and elements at the highest levels of provincial leadership, who deliberately allowed financial regulations to be bypassed.”

On May 6, 2025, the KP government launched an investigation into the "mega" corruption case in Upper Kohistan, where Rs 40bn was allegedly drawn from the provincial treasury. According to The Express Tribune "[w]hile an official embezzlement figure of Rs24 billion has been confirmed so far, PAC members expressed dissatisfaction with the explanations provided by Secretary Finance and the Accountant General." On May 14, provincial assembly member Ahmad Karim Kundi accused finance advisor Muzzammil Aslam and the account general of misappropriating Rs40 billion during a session of the Public Accounts Committee. On 15 May the Accountant General of KP recommended disciplinary action against 10 finance department officials. The AG office said it had no responsibility for the forged checks, attributing "the blame" to the National Bank of Pakistan (NBP) and Communications and Works department. The News International on 21 May said, according to an anonymous source, "two transactions of multimillion rupees were made from KP’s treasury accounts to two senior leaders of Pakistan Tehreek-e-Insaf", and said that the two were under NAB investigation.

On 25 May, an accountability court confirmed NAB orders freezing 38 properties belonging to a suspect and his family, as a part of the investigation into the alleged misappropriation of Rs 30 billion from the district accounts office. The court endorsed NAB's findings that a NBP cashier, together with officials of the Communications and Works Department and 'benamidars' engaged in "bogus withdrawal of funds", layered in different accounts.
