= Chief ministership of Pervez Khattak =

Pervez Khattak
- پرویز خٹک
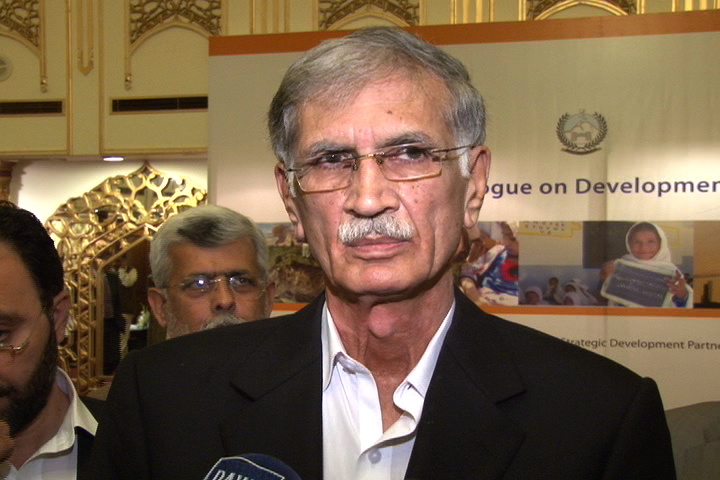
- Pervez Khattak

22nd Chief Minister of Khyber Pakhtunkhwa
- In office 31 May 2013 – 6 June 2018
- President: Asif Ali Zardari
- Prime Minister: Nawaz Sharif
- Governor: Shaukatullah Khan
- Preceded by: Tariq Pervez Khan (caretaker)
- Succeeded by: Dost Muhammad Khan (caretaker); Mahmood Khan
- Constituency: PK-13 Nowshera-II
- Majority: Pakistan Tehreek-e-Insaf
- President: Mamnoon Hussain
- Prime Minister: Shahid Khaqan Abbasi
- Governor: Mehtab Ahmed Khan

The Chief ministership of Pervez Khattak ran from 31 May 2013 to 6 June 2018. It was the coalition of provincial government of Khyber Pakhtunkhwa between Pakistan Tehreek-e-Insaf (PTI), the Islamist Jamaat-e-Islami (JI), Qaumi Watan Party (QWP), and Awami Jamhuri Ittehad Pakistan (AJIP), which later merged with PTI.

Khattak carried out healthcare reforms, such as introducing a Health Insurance Scheme, the Sehat Sahulat Program for poor people and an 'Insulin for life' fund. He also suspended the medical superintendent and staff of a Peshawar children's hospital after inspection. The provincial government severed links with the QWP over corruption and suspended membership of its minister. However, the QWP and Ziaullah Afridi had accused that the Khattak cabinet itself was involved in corruption. Khattak also sacked ministers from its own party, including Shaukat Ali Yousafzai and an advisor to Pervez Khattak over issues of poor performance. Upper limits restricting 'overage' girls above ages 25 to 27 in college admissions was abolished.

The policy of Madrassah reforms, especially funding Darul Uloom Haqqania renowned for its links with Taliban and killers of Benazir Bhutto was criticised by many. Despite PTI saying it would ban VIP culture and protocol, several roads were blocked for Pervez Khattak's convoy. The financial management of the Khyber Pakhtunkhwa government entitled it to Rs 1.5 billion ($150 million) from the federal government. The government also said it had begun construction of 350 small dams.

== Legislations ==
=== Budget ===
==== 2013–2014 ====
The PTI’s budget appeared to mostly ignore the aspects that the provincial government cannot control – militancy, the tribal areas, etc – and chooses to focus on service delivery in areas that are directly under its jurisdiction: education, health, infrastructure, etc.

— The Express Tribune,

The administration began on 13 May 2013, when Pervez Khattak was elected as the chief minister of Khyber Pakhtunkhwa by receiving 84 votes out of 124 from the Khyber Pakhtunkhwa Assembly. He was the secretary general of Pakistan Tehreek-e-Insaf (PTI). He was nominated by the party chief Imran Khan for the post in the parliamentary board meeting, and the parliamentary board after the discussion agreed to nominate him for chief ministership of Pakhtunkhwa.

On June 17, the PTI-led Khyber Pakhtunkhwa government presented a balanced, tax-free budget for the fiscal year 2013–14. Finance Minister Siraj ul Haq presented Rs 344 billion budget in the provincial assembly session, which began with Speaker Asad Qaiser in the chair. The total resources (revenue and non-revenue) and total expenditure both have been estimated at Rs 344 billion, making it a balanced budget. No new tax was imposed. The government proposed an increase of 15 per cent in the salaries and pension of government employees. The minimum limit of the retired employees' pension has been increased from Rs 3,000 to Rs 5,000, while the minimum wages limit has been increased to Rs 10,000. A handsome amount of Rs 118 billion has been allocated for the ADP (annual development programme), showing a 12 per cent increase. The ADP covers a total of 983 projects– including 609 ongoing and 374 new development schemes.

The government's policies are geared towards radical change. At the end of its tenure, it aims at successfully imposing a uniform education system, ending corruption in government offices and bringing economic and political stability to the militancy-hit region. The administration is closely supervised by Imran Khan who chairs the Khyber Pakhtunkhwa Development Advisory Committee. The committee comprises senior PTI members, including Asad Umar, Jehangir Khan Tareen, Ali Asghar Khan, Khalid Mehsud and Rustam Shah Mohmand.

It also increased 30% of total spending for education to 102 billion rupees while Rs 1.97 billion for promotion of technical education and manpower training. The minister said that Rs 22.80 billion have been earmarked for the health sector, Rs 23.78 billion for police, Rs3.12 billion for Irrigation, Rs2.91 billion for agriculture, Rs1.27 billion for the environment, Rs 4.93 billion for communication and works, Rs0.24 billion for pension and Rs2.50 billion for subsidy on wheat, while Rs 11.16 billion have been put aside for debt clearance. The budget was a brainchild of Asad Umar, according to The Express Tribune 'Budgets in Khyber-Pakhtunkhwa have historically been a litany of complaints against the federal government, followed by a recitation of numbers that, frequently, the PTI-led Khyber-Pakhtunkhwa government delivered their first governing document and made sure to lay out their strategy for the development of the province and connect it to their spending decisions, as laid out in the numbers.'

=== Right to Information Bill ===
On July 10, 2013, the provincial Cabinet of Khyber Pakhtunkhwa approved the "Right to Information Bill" to guarantee people's access to information and promote transparency in affairs of the government. Under the proposed law, all matters of the government would be displayed on the official website of the provincial government and in case of seeking any information anybody would submit an application.

=== Local government laws ===
Khyber-Pakhtunkhwa government on July 21, 2013, expressed its willingness to enact laws allocating a quota for youth seats in the local government (LG) setup. The PTI has also suggested legislation to make the female electorate's participation mandatory only when voting for women candidates vying for local government seats. Local government setup would have union councils and district councils comprising farmers and women representatives. The development funds would be given to local governments instead of members of the provincial assemblies. It is expected the elections would be held in September 2013 for a 4-year term. A local government bill was finally passed in October 2013 and included comprehensive reform and devolution of power to Local Government, which included financial and administrative independence, which is unprecedented in Pakistani history.

=== K-P Population Policy 2013 ===
On January 12, 2014, the Khyber Pakhtunkhwa government published the first draft for population policy. According to the draft the government plans to decrease the population growth rate from 2.05% to 1.8% by 2020, by focusing on a major sensitisation drive, particularly among the youth and women, by proposing the inclusion of family planning in the curriculum for higher secondary education and academic levels above it.

== Corruption, accountability and transparency ==
=== Ramadan price regulations ===
Unlike Punjab province, which experienced a runaway rise in prices during Ramadan, due to unfair consumer practices, in Pakhtunkhwa online price markets meant that businesses were forced to sell their goods at a non-monopolistic price, in line with fair trade rules.

=== Asset declaration ===
On August 1, 2013, the government of Khyber-Pakhtunkhwa directed all the government employees in the province to declare their assets by August 30, 2013. K-P minister for health and provincial government spokesperson Shaukat Ali Yousafzai stated that all the secretaries of the government departments were directed to issue notices to their employees to declare assets by August 30, 2013. He added that if politicians are required to declare their financial assets to the nation the same law should also be applied to government employees.

=== Biometric polling ===
On January 2, 2014, The Pakistan Tehreek-e-Insaf (PTI)-led provincial government pushed the Election Commission to hold the forthcoming local government election in Khyber Pakhtunkhwa using the biometric system and offered to assume the costs for such an approach. Official sources told The News that the experience of the recent mock polling held by the Election Commission in cooperation with the provincial government and NADRA at four polling stations in urban and rural Peshawar was discussed at a meeting in Islamabad and the shortcomings were reviewed.

They said another mock polling using the biometric machines developed by National Database and Registration Authority would now be held in Islamabad, possibly before January 14 to see if the process could be improved. The official sources said the PTI-led government in Khyber Pakhtunkhwa was keen to try the biometric system in the local government election in the province to ensure transparent polls and was ready to bear the cost that is estimated at between one and two billion rupees. An estimated 50,000 biometric machines would be required for polling votes in the province.

== Development ==
=== Education ===
==== Education City ====
On December 16, 2013, The Express Tribune stated that around 20 international universities had expressed an interest in opening up campuses at ‘Education City’ in Khyber Pakhtunkhwa. The proposed hub will accommodate campuses of national and international universities to provide Pakistani students with the opportunity to obtain foreign degrees at home, stated officials of the provincial higher education department. Around 30,000 kanals of land in Jehangira will be used to build the education city. The project will be adjacent to the proposed Mega-City near the Swabi Interchange on the Peshawar-Islamabad Motorway.

Moreover, National University of Sciences and Technology, Pakistan and Bahria University agreed to open campuses in Education City.

==== Enrollment drive ====
The K-P government has been making several efforts to enhance the province’s literacy rate. Apart from increasing the education sector’s budget, the government also conducted an enrolment drive in which 5 million children were reportedly enrolled in schools.

— The Express Tribune

On September 28, 2013, The Express Tribune reported that the Khyber-Pakhtunkhwa government had enrolled 142,140 children in schools across the province since the enrollment drive was launched on September 10, according to the education department. Alif Ailaan, a campaign for education reform, is supporting the K-P government's initiative to increase enrollment through its Alif Ailaan Taleemi Karavan. The caravan started the third leg of its journey in Charsadda, where a discussion on the importance of education was held with local communities followed by the enrolment of 16 children. The caravan then moved on to Mardan where it was received by Atif along with more than 350 members of civil society, teachers’ unions, parents and community members. An enrollment ceremony was held following the event where the education minister himself enrolled 10 children.

Since the enrolment drive commenced, 6,486 children have been enrolled in Charsadda, 14,341 in Mardan and 21,821 in the Peshawar district, which currently leads the enrolment headcount. Kohistan is at the bottom of the list with only 531 school enrolments. The data from other districts have not been released by the government as yet.

==== Biometric attendance system ====
On August 28, 2013, the K-P Government installed a global positioning satellite (GPS)-based biometric system (BMS) to ensure 100% attendance of teachers. The BMS mechanism is followed by a file tracking system wherein all records of the education department and schools will be computerised. This will ensure the availability of every record at all times.

==== Uniform learning system ====
Students of grade one will be promoted to grade two where they will also study in English. With every promotion, they (students) will be introduced to the new medium and things will change slowly till they reach matriculation.

— Muhammad Atif Khan, Education minister

On January 6, 2014 the Express Tribune reported that as part of Pakistan Tehreek-e-Insaf's ‘jihad against illiteracy,’ the Khyber-Pakhtunkhwa government had announced the new medium of instruction in state-run schools. A uniform learning system is part of PTI's six-point education policy, which also looks to pad the education budget and boost adult literacy. The most recent annual budget saw a 40% increase in funds allotted to the education department, giving K-P the means to change the medium of instruction for grade one. Starting with the new academic year in April, students of grade one across the province will be studying mathematics and science in the English language. Before letting students dive into the new system, the government will train and prepare teachers for the new course. Moreover, education at the primary level has been made free of cost, and female students have been promised a monthly stipend of RS. 200 to encourage schooling and education for women.

==== Tameer-e-School ====
We have already posted on website 121 schools, missing facilities and estimated costs and asked people to sponsor any facility in any school of their choice.

— Muhammad Atif Khan, Education minister

On April 19, 2014, The News International reported that the government that has declared an education emergency in Khyber Pakhtunkhwa is finding itself unable to reconstruct the destroyed schools or provide for missing facilities, to counter the program Minister for Education Muhammad Atif Khan said the government was launching a “Tameer-e-School” programme to encourage affluent individuals to fund missing facilities in thousands of schools. He said his party Chairman Imran Khan would take ownership of this initiative.

==== Education City ====
On July 9, 2014, the education department has made available all of its statistics and maps, even for schools with missing facilities online on its website. The data on the website includes comprehensive details on all 28,280 government schools in the province. Information from each school on enrolled students, employed teachers, parent-teacher councils as well as both available and missing facilities are cleanly and neatly categorised. You can even download KML formats of the 25 maps to see them in Google Earth.

This information is part of the department's EMIS which stands for “Education Management Information System”. It helps the department collect data, store it, integrate it, analyse and finally disseminate it. This collection of information makes it possible for planners and administrators to assess the system and its workings more effectively.

==== Education Management Information System ====
On July 9, 2014, the education department has made available all of its statistics and maps, even for schools with missing facilities online on its website. The data on the website includes comprehensive details on all 28,280 government schools in the province. Information from each school on enrolled students, employed teachers, parent-teacher councils as well as both available and missing facilities are cleanly and neatly categorised.

This information is part of the department's EMIS which stands for “Education Management Information System”. It helps the department collect data, store it, integrate it, analyse and finally disseminate it. This collection of information makes it possible for planners and administrators to assess the system and its workings more effectively.

=== Counter unemployment schemes ===
The Khattak administration launched the 'Khud Kafalat Scheme', which provided microfinancing between Rs. 50000 to Rs. 0.2 million to unemployed youth in order to help their startup businesses and incentivise entrepreneurship. Rs. 2 billion from the annual budget was dedicated to the scheme.

=== Promoting industrialization ===
The Khyber-Pakhtunkhwa (K-P) approved a policy for rapid industrialization aiming to utilise the province's rich natural resources, according to a statement issued on June 20, 2013. Under the policy, industrialists would be offered cheap electricity near the numerous hydropower generation sites in the province, said the statement issued following a meeting chaired by K-P Chief Secretary Mohammad Shahzad Arbab at Civil Secretariat. The discussed policy also states an independent and autonomous power distribution organisation be formed to enable the provincial government to evenly distribute any power generated from these alternative means between domestic and industrial consumers. Therefore, the offer of cheap electricity will not only be limited to hydropower generating sites alone but include gas-generated electricity as well because gas is in abundance in the southern districts of K-P, said the statement. Various other policy decisions were also made during the meeting including inviting experts to help give a concrete shape to the industrialisation policy. It was also proposed the government should concentrate on creating economic zones in various parts of the province.

=== Energy generation ===
The K-P government has allocated a sum of Rs373 million for power generation schemes in the province for the fiscal year 2013–2014.

On December 26, 2013, The News International reported that a group of the heads of Chinese investment companies, who called on Chief Minister Pervez Khattak and offered to invest in the energy sector particularly the hydel power generation in Malakand Division. Welcoming the offer, the chief minister said the Chinese companies had shown interest to make huge investments in Khyber Pakhtunkhwa. A handout said Pervez Khattak held a meeting with the investors here.

==== Hydel ====
On July 12, 2013, The Pakistan Tehreek-e-Insaf-led provincial government signed a Memorandum of Understanding (MoU) with a foreign company on Friday in a bid to tackle the burgeoning power crisis. The MoU was signed with Galaxy Consortium, a company working in the hydel power sector, during a ceremony at the Chief Minister House. According to the MoU, which was signed by K-P Energy and Power Secretary Khalid Gillani and Galaxy Group Chief Executive Officer Edward Brigham, the company will invest $2 billion in hydel power generation in Khyber-Pakhtunkhwa (K-P) to produce 1,800 megawatts (MW) of electricity. The projects would be based on Public-Private Partnership (PPP) and Build-Operate-Transfer (BOT) basis. The sites for the projects would be decided through mutual consultations, while the provincial government would facilitate the company through one-window operations.

=== Law enforcement ===
==== Capability enhancements ====
To impart efficiency in tracing criminals, the Khyber Pakhtunkhwa government has imparted special training to investigation officers in the Investigation Headquarters of Peshawar. The special investigation courses started under the supervision of Additional Inspector General Investigation. During these training sessions, special investigation officers and experts delivered lectures regarding the process of registering FIRs and preparing challans against criminals. These schools will complete two courses in a single month duration and would be consisted of a variety of subjects about the investigation process. Similarly, in each police line at the district level, special training schools would be established to improve the performance of police both at the rural and the urban levels. It has also been decided that after each terrorist incident, a special investigation team will visit the site and would collect detailed information regarding the incident and its nature in the light of modern techniques of investigation.

==== Police-to-victim service ====
On August 1, 2013, Khyber Pakhtunkhwa Inspector General of Police (IGP) inaugurated the ‘police-to-victim service’ wherein police officials will visit the victims of crimes such as kidnappings, armed robbery, and family members in the event of a murder. This service revolves around the recently established, police operations room, which is a central complaint cell that can be reached via telephone 24 hours a day. Upon receiving the complaint the pertinent police station will be notified. The police will then reach the victim/crime scene, inspect the surroundings, collect evidence, register an FIR and keep the operations room updated on their progress. The operations room will, in turn, keep the victims informed of the developments.

==== Online FIR System ====
On July 6, 2013, Khyber Pakhtunkhwa police launched an online First Information Report (FIR) system, a first of its kind in Pakistan. The system will allow Pakhtunkhwa residents to register FIRs online thus removing the hassle of travelling to police stations.

==== Women-centric developments ====
On July 23, 2013, Khyber Pakthunkhwa police launched a new SMS SOS system for the women of the province. Allowing them to lodge a complaint with the police by sending a text message from their cellular phones. After the text message is received, a central cell will notify the nearest police station to send help to the concerned woman in the shortest possible time. This initiative was taken to help women in distress who are generally reluctant to visit the police stations due to the rampant male chauvinism.

Also, the provincial government aims at forming special women help desks in all police stations in the province to cater for women complainants. As of August 2013, 56 such complaint units have been established in police stations across Khyber Pakhtunkhwa.

On 07 Jan 2014, Al Jazeera English reported K-P's women-centric policy developments. According to the report, the K-P government has ensured 10% of all new recruits would be women with the aim to double the number of female recruits. Regardless of governments support conservative social values and the dangers of the job keep many women away. The report also featured dedicated women desks at police stations and women dorms at police training colleges.

==== Raids ====
- On January 8, 2014, A proclaimed offender was killed while 45 people were arrested on suspicion in a search operation conducted in the jurisdiction of Badhaber and Bhanamari police stations on Tuesday. Police raided several houses in Bazid Khel, Ahmad Khel, Musazai, Badhaber, Khattako Pul and Kagawala areas. In Musazai village, police raided the house of the proclaimed offender, Gongatay, who was not present there at the time. When officials reached the house, another person opened fire at the police, who retaliated and left the offender severely injured. The accused was rushed to the Lady Reading Hospital but succumbed to his injuries on the way.
- On May 16, 2013, a police operation in Nowshera conducted to recover former prime minister Yousaf Raza Gilani's son, security personnel recovered a captive and arrested four abductors, Express News reported.

==== Prison system ====
The number of high-security prisons is being increased in order to jail terrorists. A new prison is being built in Swabi, and the government has purchased the land for the prison correction facility. KPK's first juvenile facility will also be opening its doors in the near future.

=== Justice ===
==== Mobile courts ====
Finance Minister Sirajul Haq said in his budget speech that the provincial government would establish mobile courts in the province so that to ensure justice to people at all levels. In this connection, the high court had prepared two drafts of the Criminal Mobile Courts Act, 2012, and the Civil Mobile Courts Act, 2012 and sent them to the provincial law department for legislation in the assembly. Such courts will hold sittings at town/ union councils/ police stations or other places specified by the high court on a rotation basis as may be directed by the district judge.

On July 26, 2013, the mobile courts' project was inaugurated. The travelling court is equipped with a solar energy generation system and has been prepared at a cost of Rs15 million. International charities are helping the KPK government in financing this new project

=== Health and social welfare ===
==== Sehat ka Insaf ====
In what has been described as a “historic, remarkable achievement”, the government said it inoculated around 0.4 million children against nine diseases, including polio, in 45 union councils of Peshawar on Sunday – the first day of the Sehat ka Insaf campaign.

— The Express Tribune

I am here to congratulate the Pakistan Tehreek-e-Insaf (PTI) for its innovative approach to child health. The model being implemented in Peshawar has completed six rounds, and the experience has been commendable.

— Margaret Chan

Sehat ka Insaf literally 'Justice for Health' is an immunization campaign started by the K-P government after severe criticism of increasing polio cases in the province. On its first day around 0.4 million children against nine diseases were inoculated in 45 union councils of Peshawar.

According to Shaukat Ali Yousafzai, 12,500 hygiene kits carrying soap, water cleaning tablets, and containers for clean drinking water were distributed in 24 union councils while remaining residents will be able to receive their packages from medical camps in their respective union councils from Monday. Yousafzai explained that 1,992 teams, including 981 PTI volunteers, took part on the first day, adding 175 teachers who were also among the team. The campaign will extend to other districts of Khyber-Pakhtunkhwa (K-P) after covering Peshawar entirely. Sehat ka Insaf volunteers will visit homes every Sunday to immunise children against vaccine-preventable diseases and distribute health kits. Following praise from the UN, it was decided to extend the vaccination drive out of Peshawar and into Khyber-Pakthunkwha's rural areas

On February 22, 2014, the Express Tribune reported that the Sindh government, inspired by Pakistan Tehreek-e-Insaf (PTI)’s ‘Sehat Ka Insaf’ immunisation campaign in Khyber-Pakhtunkhwa, has decided to replicate the anti-polio campaign in Karachi. The campaign in Karachi is a replica of the ‘Sehat ka Insaf’ which proved gainful for the Khyber-Pakhtunkhwa government. Despite the fact that the campaign launched by the PTI was a successful model, the provincial government avoids appreciating the drive.

‘Sehat Ka Insaf’ has received praise by the director-general of the World Health Organization Dr. Margaret Chan.

==== Rehabilitation of drug addicts ====
To rehabilitate drug addicts, the K-P government has planned seven new projects to provide better social welfare services to the underprivileged groups of society. A Darul Kafala (shelter home) and Drug Addicts Rehabilitation Centre will be established in Peshawar at an estimated cost of Rs58.5 million.

==== Health insurance ====
Actually launched on September 1, 2016 (Dawn Newspaper Article). On August 7, 2013, the KPK government announced to start a Micro Health Insurance Initiative in four districts of the province to provide medical assistance to impoverished families. The districts that will be covered under this project are Kohat, Mardan, Malakand and Chitral. The cost of the project is Rs. 1.16 billion of which the KPK government will provide Rs. 165.9 million while the rest will be covered by the Germany-based Kreditanstalt für Wiederaufbau (KfW) development bank. The program will cover both public and private healthcare with an annual threshold of Rs. 25,000 per person with a maximum of 7 people per household being accommodated. A total of 15,876 households in Chitral, 26,040 in Malakand, 77,135 in Mardan and 36,256 in Kohat are expected to benefit from this scheme which is the first of its kind in the country. The KpK government extended the program further by providing an extra Rs. 250 million to the health insurance scheme along with Rs. 25 million for 'insulin for life' campaign to allow the poor to have access to insulin in the poorer districts.

==== Human rights directorate ====
On December 14, 2013, the K-P government established countries first Human rights directorate, named Khyber-Pakhtunkhwa (K-P) Human Rights Directorate. Any citizen can lodge a complaint regarding any issue they confront, the head of the directorate would act as a complainant and process the case accordingly. Chief minister's spokesperson Shiraz Paracha, while talking to The Express Tribune said the setting up of the human rights directorate should be viewed as part of a series of laws passed by the K-P government to establish a checks and balances system.

=== Tourism ===
Today, I feel happy to visit this scenic tourist resort. Promotion of tourism is the top priority of our government and we are taking major steps in this regard, Several tourist-friendly projects will soon be launched, including another ski resort, a chairlift and a four-star hotel in Malam Jabba.

— Pervez Khattak
- History Train: On 1 January 2014, Tourism Corporation of Khyber Pakhtunkhwa launched a new train service from Peshawar to Attock, hundreds of tourists travelled on the first of day of service. The journey also takes passengers over Old Attock Bridge, an iron girder bridge built over the Indus River in 1883 and originally designed by Sir Guilford Lindsey Molesworth. Attock Khurd, located in the Attock district of Punjab, houses the historical Attock Fort built by the Mughal king Akbar in 1581. Bahram ki Baradari is another Mughal-era monument situated at the ridge of mountains on the southern side of the Grand Trunk Road near Attock Khurd. Akora Khattak, which the train also traverses, is the birth and burial place of famous Pukhtun poet, warrior, scholar and chief of the Khattak tribe, Khushal Khan Khattak. As part of the joy ride, the women participating also visited Kund Rest House where they enjoyed a boat ride.
- Swat Snow Festival 2014: On 13 March 2014, five-day snow festival kicked off amid scores of tourists from all over the country at the scenic ski resort in Malam Jabba. Chief Minister (CM) Pervez Khattak and Major General Javed Bukhari inaugurated the opening ceremony of the festival which was organised by the army in collaboration with the provincial government. Apart from ski competitions, ski facilities for tourists, snowmobile rides, tobogganing, aeromodelling and paragliding have been arranged as part of the festival to attract tourists. Al Jazeera English reported, 'With one rickety chairlift and hopes for a peaceful future, Pakistan's once-bustling and only commercial ski resort is attempting a comeback. It is gradually being revived under the guidance of the Pakistani army guard.'
- Water sports festival: The three-day festival entertained picnickers with activities like boating, fishing and performances by folk artists from different parts of the country. Traditional food and handicraft stalls have also been set up by the lake. In addition, a play area has been installed for children, keeping in mind the large number of families heading to the festival. The event successfully attracted 150,000 visitors during the three days.

=== Environment ===
The Government launched the 'Green Khyber-Pakthunkhwa' campaign with the aim to plant 8 million trees across the province, within a three-month period

On Apr 30, 2015, Al Jazeera English reported on K-P government's one billion trees project costing $150m in reforestation.

== Conflicts ==
=== Pakistan Tobacco Board ===
On December 23, 2013, The Express Tribune reported that the federal and Khyber Pakhtunkhwa (K-P) governments were at loggerheads after the former turned down the K-P's demand to hand it over the control of Pakistan Tobacco Board (PTB) under the 18th constitutional amendment. The K-P government is of the view that under the said amendment, agriculture has become a provincial subject as tobacco is a cash crop like wheat, sugar cane and cotton. After the federal government's refusal the K-P is trying to take up the matter to the Council of Common Interest (CCI) for more than a year.

=== Peshawar Electric Supply Company ===
On December 27, 2013, Chairman Pakistan Tehreek-e-Insaf Imran Khan asked the federal government to hand over the Peshawar Electric Supply Company (PESCO) to Khyber Pakhtunkhwa in order to control the frequent breakdown of electricity. The demand was accepted by the federal government. Chief Minister Pervez Khattak, in letters sent to Prime Minister Nawaz Sharif and Federal Minister for Water and Power Khawaja Asif, made a formal offer on behalf of his government to take over administrative control of the Peshawar Electric Supply Company (PESCO) on conditions that would be hard for the federal government to accept.

While the federal government wanted to shift as quickly the toughest task of controlling the power theft and collecting of bills to KP, the latter did not want to work only as a ‘meter reader’ and insisted on full control of power generation. While Prime Minister Nawaz Sharif sanctioned the transfer of only administrative control of PESCO, KP sought the handover of all power sector assets, including PESCO, along with the necessary paraphernalia. The province requested that as the central power system had failed to deliver, control of all the three elements of generation, distribution and transmission be given to the province through an all-encompassing package deal.

=== End of coalition with Qaumi Watan Party ===
On November 13, 2013, Dawn News reported that Pakistan Tehreek-i-Insaf chief Imran Khan had ended his party's alliance with the Qaumi Watan Party after Khyber Pakhtunkhwa Chief Minister Pervez Khattak ‘dismissed’ two QWP ministers on corruption charges. The two QWP ministers expelled from the provincial cabinet were Bakht Baidar and Ibrar Hussain. The former held the ministry of industries, commerce and labour, while the latter was the environment minister.

The QWP was the first among the smaller parliamentary groups in the provincial assembly that had consented, after being contacted by Khattak, to support his party in forming the coalition government after it emerged as the largest party in the province. By virtue of Khan's decision, it also happens to be the first party that has been shown the door by the PTI.

== Major events ==
- Peshawar T20 Peace Match: On October 13, 2013, Peshawar hosted the first cricket match in 6 years, organised by the Pakistan Tehreek-e-Insaf Sports and Culture Forum in collaboration with the Khyber-Pakhtunkhwa Sports and Culture Directorate. The match was played by major national cricketers. Chief Minister Pervez Khattak, Information Minister Shah Farman and various MPAs attended the match while PTI chief Imran Khan was the chief guest. Speaking at the closing ceremony, Imran Khan announced the K-P government would build a sports stadium in every tehsil of every district and a talent hunt programme would also be launched in the province and the tribal areas. Khan said players from K-P will make the national team stronger. “Many national players, including Shoaib Akhtar and Shahid Afridi, were selected during the talent hunt programmes. The provincial government will soon start such a programme for under-17 players,” Imran said. The last test match at Arbab Niaz Stadium was played in August 2003 between Pakistan and Bangladesh, while the last One Day International match was played on 6 February 2006, between Pakistan and India.
- Imran Khan's first visit: On June 25, 2013 Imran Khan in his first visit to the Khyber Pakhtunkhwa since Tehreek-e-Insaf formed government, urged for a national policy to end terrorism in the region. He addressed a press conference at the Chief Minister Secretariat after meeting his party's coalition partners and presiding over a high-level meeting of the cabinet members, government lawmakers and top bureaucrats. Khan maintained all government advisors, lawmakers, ministers and bureaucrats will reveal their assets which will be uploaded on government websites for the public's knowledge. Khan announced development funds would no longer be given to provincial lawmakers instead they would be spent through the district development authority once the new local government system is in place. Khan also disallowed Khyber Pakhtunkhwa Chief Minister Pervez Khattak from using a helicopter for traveling.

== Criticism ==
=== China visit decline ===
On September 5, 2014, The Express Tribune reported that the Khyber-Pakhtunkhwa's struggling economy took a hit when the province's chief executive reportedly bowed out of a visit to China, arranged by the Chinese government to discuss investment in various sectors across all provinces. Awami National Party (ANP) parliamentary leader in the K-P Assembly Sardar Hussain Babak also criticised the PTI-led provincial government for being involved in a tussle with the central government and ignoring the province.

=== Forward Bloc ===
On April 2, 2014, The Express Tribune reported that 14 lawmakers belonging to the Pakistan Tehreek-e-Insaf (PTI) have reportedly formed a forward bloc in the Khyber Pakhtunkhwa Assembly, terming it a group of like-minded individuals. PTI Member Provincial Assembly (MPA) from Nowshera, Qurban Ali, is said to be heading the group, which includes Javed Naseem from Peshawar, and twelve other lawmakers from the province.

A party official confirmed the report and informed that the MPAs met and demanded a due share in the government and also displayed reservations at the party high-ups’ interference in provincial matters, especially over the recent appointment of ministers and advisers in the cabinet. The official said the MPAs have shown confidence in PTI Chairman Imran Khan, probably for fear of disqualification from the party, and claim that being party workers, it is their right to raise their voice for their rights as they are accountable to their followers. The recent induction of ministers and advisers in the K-P cabinet, along with the shuffling of the health ministry portfolio, fuelled rumours of internal rifts within the party. When contacted, PTI Provincial General Secretary Khalid Masood said the group is not a forward bloc but just an assembly of like-minded MPAs who share grievances with the party leadership.

=== Oil Theft and Bank of Khyber corruption cases ===
In June 2016, Dawn had reported that the KP government had "swept high-profile cases under the carpet", the first of these being a 2014 oil-theft case, where it was estimated Rs10–20 billion was stolen from the Hungarian Oil and Gas (MOL) company's Banda Daud Shah transmission line. The second case involving financial mismanagement in the Bank of Khyber (BOK). After an inquiry committee submitted a report to CM Pervez Khattak in May 2016, he said it would be presented to the provincial assembly. However, the report was not submitted to the provincial assembly or released. According to Dawn, "PTI and Jamaat-i-Islami both coalition partners are keeping mum over the issue obviously to save the coalition from falling apart. Opposition in the assembly is insisting for judicial inquiry, but PTI and JI are opposing involvement of high court in the matter." Provincial cabinet member Mushtaq Ahmad Ghani said the BOK case was a "dead horse".

=== Protests ===
- On January 6, 2014, Maulana Fazlur Rehman, expressed concerns over the increasing kidnapping for ransom cases, extortion, and law and order situation in the province. Jamiat Ulema-e-Islam announced a protest against the Pakistan Tehreek-e-Insaf-led government's performance from January 26, 2014.
- On March 2, 2014, a seminar held at Peshawar Press Club which was sponsored by feudal of KP termed provincial government's plan to introduce a uniform English-medium curriculum in all state-run institutions across the province is “a conspiracy to keep our young generation away from their national language and culture.” They urged that The government should immediately withdraw the introduction of English-medium education intended for the next academic session. As the PA most members are feudal and elites they seem to have accepted the pressure.
- On May 13, 2014, local businessmen in Nathiagali expressed their concern about the timing of the anti-encroachment drive, which they fear is too close to peak tourist season. The Frontier Highway Authority (FHA), with the assistance of the revenue department, has declared over 150 small and big shops and 70 eateries as having encroached. Over 80% of the occupants have demolished the extended portions of their shops and eateries on a voluntary basis, said the locals. However, businessmen remain concerned about the timing of the drive, which they fear is too close to peak tourist season. Following a verdict of the Peshawar High Court and recommendations of the National Accountability Bureau to the provincial government, GDA kicked off its anti-encroachment initiative. In April, the development authority gave shop and business owners 15 days to voluntarily clear government-owned land to avoid direct action by the anti-encroachment squad.
- Helicopter Fiasco: On June 26, 2013, PTI chief Imran Khan took notice of Khattak's helicopter use and restricted him from using the service again after he used a state helicopter to visit a friend in Haripur. The move drew heavy censure from the party supporters on social media. The next day Khattak informed the house that he had paid the bill for the helicopter from his pocket.

=== Terrorist attacks ===
Attacks have dropped comparatively due to more spending on police and the army launch of Zarb-e-Azb, nonetheless, an insurgency has continued, albeit on a lower level.

- Peshawar church attack On September 22, 2013 The Express Tribune reported that a twin suicide bombing killed at least 78 people at a church service in northwest Pakistan on Sunday, officials said, in what is believed to be the country's deadliest attack on Christians. No one claimed responsibility for the incident. The two attackers struck at the end of a service at All Saints Church in Peshawar, the main town in Khyber Pakhtunkhwa province which has borne the brunt of a bloody Islamist insurgency in recent years. The K-P government announced Rs 500,000 in compensation to the families of victims in the attack. The outlawed Tehreek-e-Taliban Pakistan (TTP) has denied involvement in the Sept 22 twin suicide bombings at All Saints Church in Peshawar – but the group says it condones the attack. However, he added that the TTP had checked with all its groups and none of them owned the church attack.
- Dera Ismail Khan jailbreak: Tehreek-e-Taliban Pakistan insurgents armed with mortars and grenades launched a major attack on the Central Prison in Dera Ismail Khan late on July 29, 2013. According to the DI Khan police commissioner, Mushtaq Jadoon, twelve policemen were killed in the attack, while 243 prisoners escaped of which 30 were hard-profile militants. A large-scale police operation, conducted hours after the initial jailbreak, lead to the arrest of 58 escapees, the remaining 185 still remain at large.
- K-P Law Minister Assassination: On 16 October 2013, a suicide bomb targeted Khyber Pakhtunkhwa Law and Parliamentary Affairs Minister Israrullah Gandapur, who was killed along with nine other people while 30 others were injured. The attack reportedly took place when the minister was meeting visitors at his traditional village in Kulachi, which is located 45 kilometres from Dera Ismail Khan. Gandapur had been elected during the May elections from PK-67 DI Khan-IV as an Independent but he later joined the ruling Pakistan Tehreek-e-Insaf.
- Murder of ANP leader: On January 12, 2014, Unknown gunmen shot dead a senior opposition leader along with two others in Peshawar. The Tehreek-e-Taliban Pakistan (TTP) has claimed responsibility. The ANP is known for its outspoken views against the Taliban and backed military operations against the insurgents while it ruled the restive Khyber Pakhtunkhwa province for five years till March 2013.
- Raiwind Markaz Attack: On January 16, 2014, At least eight worshipers, including two children, were killed and 55 others injured in a powerful bomb blast at a Tableeghi Markaz. Chairman Pakistan Tehreek-e-Insaf, Imran Khan, reprobated this inhuman attack in the strongest of words. He said the perpetrators were hell-bent on destabilizing the country by such cowardly acts of terrorism. In a rare statement, the outlawed militant outfit, Tehreek-e-Taliban Pakistan (TTP), has condemned the attack on the Tableeghi Markaz. TTP spokesman Shahidullah Shahid denied having any role in the blast.
- Aitzaz Hasan Incident: Hassan was a schoolboy from Hangu District in Khyber Pakhtunkhwa province who sacrificed his life while preventing a suicide bomber from entering his school of 2,000 students at Ibrahimzai village of Hangu, on January 6, 2014. Aitzaz's action to save his classmates captured the hearts of many in Pakistan, and he was hailed as a national hero. For his act, the office of Pakistan Prime Minister Nawaz Sharif has advised President Mamnoon Husain to confer Aitzaz Hasan with the high civil award of Sitara-e-Shujaat (Star of Bravery) by the Government of Pakistan.

== Cabinet members ==
Pakistan Tehreek-e-Insaf	Others
Other parties include Jamaat-e-Islami Pakistan and Awami Jamhuri Ittehad Pakistan. Senior ministers and chief minister are written in **bold**.

Khyber Pakhtunkhwa cabinet
Post	Minister	Term
**Chief Minister of Khyber Pakhtunkhwa**	**Pervez Khattak MP**	31 May 2013 – 6 June 2018
**Senior Minister for Finance and Statistics**	**Muzafar Said MPA**	October 2014 – May 2018
**Senior Minister for Elementary & Secondary Education**; **Minister for Energy & Power**	Muhammad Atif MPA	June 2013 - May 2018
Minister of Law	Imtiaz Shahid Qureshi MPA	October 2014 - May 2018
Minister for Irrigation	Mahmood Khan MP	June 2013 – May 2018
**Minister for Health**; **Minister for Information and Technology**	**Shahram Khan MPA**	June 2013 – May 2018
Minister of Public Health Engineering	Shah Farman MPA	June 2013 – May 2018
Minister of Revenue & Estate	**Ali Amin Khan Gandapur MPA**	June 2013 – May 2018
Minister of Local Government, Elections & Rural Development.	Sardar Inayatullah Khan GandapurMPA	June 2013 – May 2018
Minister of Zakat & Usher, Auqaf, Hajj & Religious Affairs.	Habib Ur Rehman MPA	June 2013 – May 2018
Minister for Agriculture	Ikram ullah khan Gandapur MPA	June 2013 – May 2018
**Minister for Higher Education**; **Minister for Information**	**Mushtaq Ahmed Ghani MP**	June 2013 – May 2018
Minister of Food Security	Qalandar Khan LodhiMPA	June 2013 – May 2018
Minister for Minerals and Mining	Ziaullah Afridi	June 2013 – May 2018
Minister of Excise & Taxation	Mian Jamshed ud Din	June 2013 – May 2018
Adviser on Population Welfare	Shakeel Ahmad (Pakistani politician)	June 2013 – May 2018
Adviser on Prisons	Malik Qasim Khan Khattak	June 2013 – May 2018
Adviser on Inter Provincial Coordination	Haji Abdul Haq	June 2013 – May 2018
Adviser on Sport & Tourism	Amjad Khan Afridi	June 2013 – May 2018
Adviser on Communication and Works	Akbar Ayub Khan	June 2013 – May 2018
