= Kohistan scandal =

Pakistani corruption scandal

In 2025, a massive corruption scandal emerged in Upper Kohistan, Khyber Pakhtunkhwa, Pakistan, involving alleged embezzlement of public funds from government treasury accounts, particularly one titled Security and Deposit Works KP 10113, which logged unusually high withdrawals between 2018–2024. Initial estimates of the lost funds ranged from Rs 30 billion to Rs 40 billion. The scandal is "believed to be the biggest financial scandal in the province’s history".

== Background ==
On 30 April 2025, the National Accountability Bureau (NAB) said it discovered a “scam” in the KP government, where Rs 40bn was misappropriated over a period of 5 years, despite an annual development budget of Rs 500mil–1.5bn to Upper Kohistan District. The agency said the funds were withdrawn from a provincial account titled ‘Security and Deposit Works KP 10113’, it said it identified 1,000 fake cheques and 50 account holders from the district government. According to Geo News, "The scandal not only exposed serious flaws in KP's provincial financial system but also indicated deliberate sabotage. Evidence suggests the involvement of rogue officers and elements at the highest levels of the provincial leadership, who deliberately allowed financial regulations to be bypassed."

On 6 May 2025, the KP government launched an investigation into the "mega" corruption case in Upper Kohistan, where Rs 40bn was allegedly drawn from the provincial treasury. According to The Express Tribune "[w]hile an official embezzlement figure of Rs24 billion has been confirmed so far, PAC members expressed dissatisfaction with the explanations provided by Secretary Finance and the Accountant General." On May 14, provincial assembly member Ahmad Karim Kundi accused finance advisor Muzzammil Aslam and the account general of misappropriating Rs40 billion during a session of the Public Accounts Committee. On 15 May the Accountant General of KP recommended disciplinary action against 10 finance department officials. The AG office said it had no responsibility for the forged checks, attributing "the blame" to the National Bank of Pakistan (NBP) and Communications and Works department. The News International on 21 May said, according to an anonymous source, "two transactions of multimillion rupees were made from KP’s treasury accounts to two senior leaders of Pakistan Tehreek-e-Insaf", and said that the two were under NAB investigation.

On 25 May, an accountability court confirmed NAB orders freezing 38 properties belonging to a suspect and his family, as a part of the investigation into the alleged misappropriation of Rs 30 billion from the district accounts office. The court endorsed NAB's findings that a NBP cashier, together with officials of the Communications and Works Department and 'benamidars' engaged in "bogus withdrawal of funds", layered in different accounts.

== Investigation and oversight ==
The Khyber Pakhtunkhwa Chief Minister, Ali Amin Gandapur, ordered a high‑level probe in early May 2025 into the alleged misappropriation of Rs 36 billion, including suspicious transfers to private accounts—even a dumper driver’s account holding Rs 3 billion. The Provincial Public Accounts Committee (PAC), chaired by Assembly Speaker Babar Saleem Swati, initiated hearings and ordered the suspension of officials from the Finance Department, Communication & Works (C&W), and the Accountant General’s Office over suspected involvement.

The Accountant General (AG) KPK later flagged serious irregularities, calling for disciplinary action against 10 officials and identifying 1,293 forged cheques and 52 suspicious bank accounts, estimating corruption in Upper Kohistan alone at Rs 29 billion.

== NAB inquiry & asset recovery ==
Following PAC pressure, the National Accountability Bureau (NAB) KP formally upgraded its inquiry into a full investigation into the mega‑scandal worth ~Rs 40 billion.

- Early investigations recovered over Rs 20 billion in assets, including properties, vehicles, and cash.
- Raids on 12 residences of key suspects yielded Rs 1.59 billion in cash, foreign currency, and gold (approx. 3 kg + USD 50,000).
- Later reporting placed total recovered and frozen assets at Rs 25 billion, including freezing 73 bank accounts (Rs 5 billion), seizing 77 luxury vehicles worth Rs 940 million, and confiscating 109 properties valued at approx. Rs 17 billion—like houses, flats, farmhouses, plazas, and agricultural land across Islamabad, Rawalpindi, Peshawar, Abbottabad and Mansehra.

=== Arrests ===
On 19 July 2025, NAB said it had arrested eight suspects (2 officials, 2 bankers, 4 contractors) in relation to the scandal. They were accused of having committed fraud through using fake treasury cheques towards non-existent development projects in the district through shell accounts and firms.

== Allegations & key players ==
Investigations suggest collusion among officials in the C&W Department, the District Accounts Office, National Bank of Pakistan (NBP) branches in Upper Kohistan, and contractors linked via benamidari schemes (using proxies/relatives to hide assets). Mohammad Riaz, a former bank cashier turned contractor, and his relatives are alleged to be central figures in the fraud, instrumental in bogus cheque withdrawals and layered transfers.

On June 19, NAB ordered Pakistan Tehreek-e-Insaf (PTI) leader and former federal minister Azam Swati to appear before an investigation team as a part of a probe, after it alleged Rs 300 million had been transferred into his personal account. However, it was later reported that Swati failed to appear before the accountability bureau, instead his legal counsel represented him. Later in June, Swati appeared before a NAB investigation committee, where he was questioned. On 14 July 2025, NAB again ordered him to appear, after it said the documents, he submitted in relation to the case were "insufficient".

== Reactions ==
Opposition leaders accused the then-provincial government and the ruling party, Pakistan Tehreek-e-Insaf (PTI), of systemic corruption. Federal officials commended NAB's actions while highlighting governance failures. Punjab's Information Minister Azma Bukhari called the scandal a “disgrace” and a failure of KP’s governance, accusing the ruling coalition of systemic corruption and mismanagement across a decade.
