= The Khyber Pakhtunkhwa Mines and Minerals Bill, 2025 =

Proposed legislation in the Provincial Assembly of Khyber Pakhtunkhwa

Khyber Pakhtunkhwa Mines and Minerals Bill, 2025

Provincial Assembly of Khyber Pakhtunkhwa
- Introduced by: Government of Khyber Pakhtunkhwa
- Introduced: 4 April 2025

Related legislation
- KP Mines and Minerals Act, 2017
- Status: Unknown

The Khyber Pakhtunkhwa Mines and Minerals Bill, 2025 is a legislative proposal introduced in the Provincial Assembly of Khyber Pakhtunkhwa on 4 April 2025 to the existing KP Mines and Minerals Act, 2017. The bill seeks to amend the existing regulatory framework for mining in the province, aiming to attract investment, enhance transparency, and address illegal mining. It also proposes the establishment of new bodies such as a Mineral Investment Facilitation Authority and provisions for joint ventures in large-scale mining projects.

However the bill has sparked controversyamong political leaders, industry stakeholders, and civil society groups., with critics alleging federal overreach and threats to provincial autonomy under the Eighteenth Amendment to the Constitution of Pakistan. As of December 2025, the bill remains under discussion and has not been passed into law.

== Background ==
Khyber Pakhtunkhwa is rich in mineral resources, including marble, limestone, gemstones, and other deposits. The province's mining sector has been regulated under previous laws, including amendments in prior years.

The 2025 bill was introduced by the then Pakistan Tehreek-e-Insaf (PTI)-Ali Amin Gandapur led provincial government amid efforts to align provincial laws with federal initiatives for mineral development and attract foreign investment. It follows national discussions on harmonising mineral regulations across provinces.

The bill was tabled in the KP Provincial Assembly on 4 April 4 2025, to modernize the mining sector, enhance regulatory frameworks, and attract investment following revisions from an initial draft prepared by the federal government. It seeks to modernize mining regulations but has faced backlash from provincial stakeholders, including PTI leaders and small-scale miners, who argue it disproportionately favors large corporations and federal entities. Key objectives include establishing dedicated licensing and exploration sections within the Directorate of Mines and Minerals, creating a provincial Mines and Mineral Force, and forming a Mineral Investment Facilitation Authority (MIFA) to oversee sector development.

== Provisions ==
The bill proposes updates to the 2017 mining law, including requirements for joint ventures with government-owned entities in large-scale mining (investments over Rs 500 million), digitisation of licensing, and the creation of facilitation authorities. It includes provisions for advisory input from federal bodies and measures to curb illegal mining. Special considerations are outlined for merged tribal districts until 2030.

== Controversies ==
The bill faced immediate opposition from within the ruling PTI, opposition parties, mine owners, student groups, and civil society. Critics argued that certain clauses could allow federal overreach, violating provincial rights post the 18th Amendment. Protests and all-parties conferences rejected the draft.

The provincial government issued a white paper defending the bill and called for consultations. Passage was conditioned on approval from PTI founder Imran Khan.

== Political and public reactions ==
=== Intra-party disputes ===
The bill has led to internal disagreements within the ruling Pakistan Tehreek-e-Insaf (PTI) party. Notably, Chief Minister Ali Amin Gandapur and Provincial Minister Atif Khan have clashed over the bill's implications. Atif Khan, along with other ministers, has opposed the bill, stating it is not in the best interest of the people of Khyber Pakhtunkhwa. In response, Gandapur has dismissed the criticisms, suggesting that the issue is personal rather than substantive.

=== Opposition Parties' Stance ===
Opposition parties, including the Qaumi Watan Party (QWP), have expressed strong objections to the bill. QWP leader Sikandar Sherpao criticized the proposed federal involvement in provincial mineral affairs, describing it as an erosion of the province's authority over its resources.

=== Industry stakeholders' concerns ===
The Minerals Association of Khyber Pakhtunkhwa has rejected the bill, citing a lack of consultation and transparency. Association leaders have called for the formation of a committee with representation from all stakeholders to develop a consensus on the proposed law. They have also warned of potential economic implications, including rising unemployment and law and order challenges, if the bill is enacted without addressing their concerns.

== Current status ==
As of 11 April 2025, the bill remains under consideration in the Provincial Assembly. PTI's provincial spokesperson, Malik Adeel Iqbal has said that the assembly will not approve the bill yet and the final decision will be taken by the party's founding chairman Imran Khan.

== See also ==
- Khyber Pakhtunkhwa Department of Minerals Development
