= Mashal Yousafzai =

Pakistani government official

Mashal Yousafzai مشال یُوسفزئی

Member of the Senate of Pakistan
- Incumbent
- Assumed office 8 August 2025
- Preceded by: Sania Nishtar
- Constituency: Khyber Pakhtunkhwa

Advisor to the Chief Minister of Khyber Pakhtunkhwa
- In office 7 March 2024 – 11 September 2024

Personal details
- Party: PTI (2023-present)
- Known for: Lawyer for Imran Khan and PTI

Mashal Azam Yousafzai (Urdu: مشال اعظم یُوسفزئی) is a lawyer and legislator from Pakistan. She has been a member of the Senate of Pakistan since August 2025. She previously served as an advisor on Zakat, Ushr, Social Welfare, and Women Empowerment to then Khyber Pakhtunkhwa Chief Minister, Ali Amin Gandapur.
