= Syed Qasim Ali Shah =

Pakistani politician

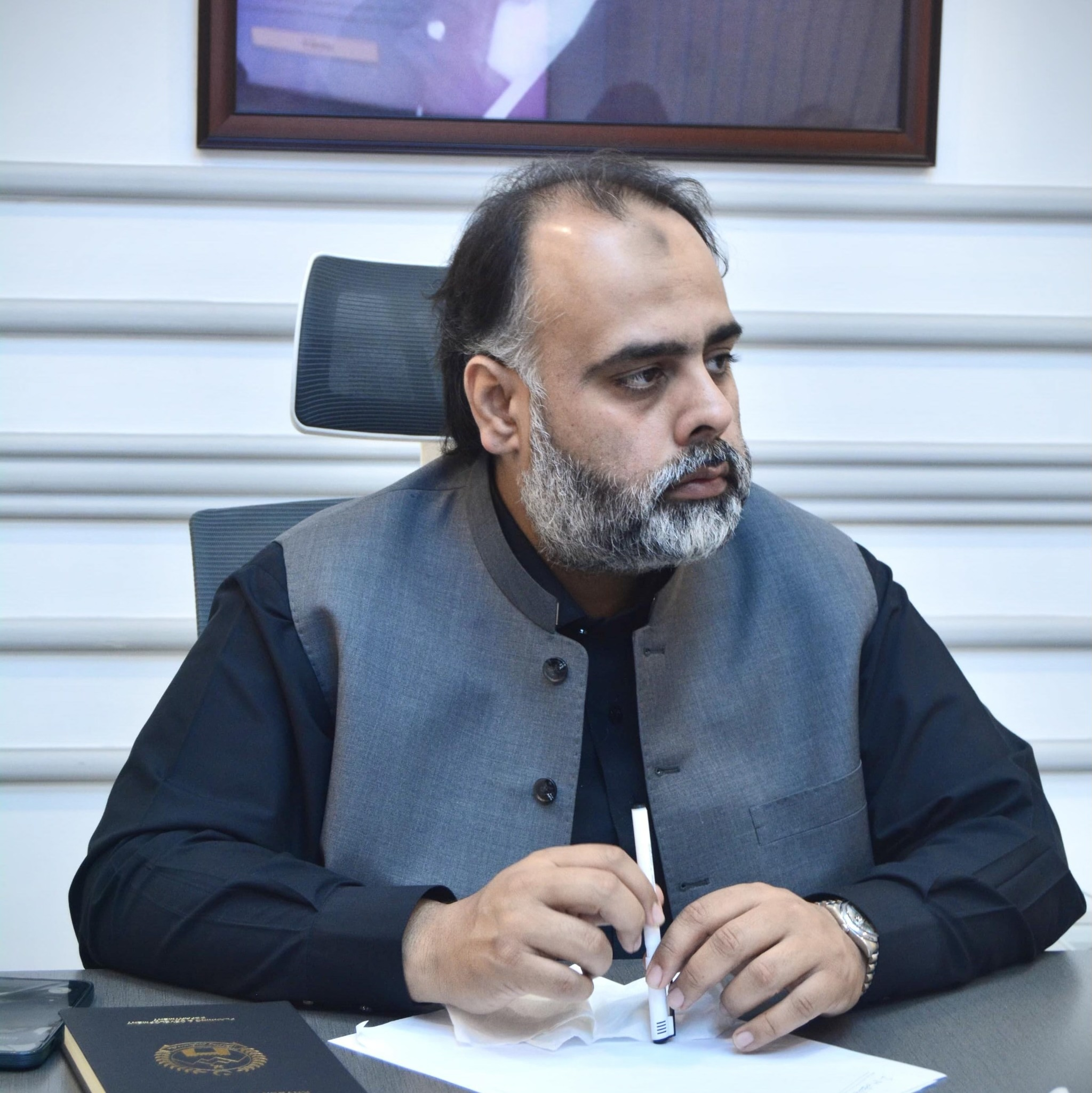

Provincial Minister of Social Welfare and Women Empowerment for Khyber Pakhtunkhwa
- In office 11 September 2024 – 13 October 2025
- Chief Minister: Ali Amin Gandapur

Provincial Minister of Health for Khyber Pakhtunkhwa
- In office 7 March 2024 – 11 September 2024
- Chief Minister: Ali Amin Gandapur

Member of the Provincial Assembly of Khyber Pakhtunkhwa
- Incumbent
- Assumed office 29 February 2024
- Constituency: PK-81 Peshawar-X

Personal details
- Political party: PTI (2013-present)

Syed Qasim Ali Shah is a Pakistani politician from the Peshawar District in Khyber Pakhtunkhwa. He served as the Minister for Social Welfare and Women Empowerment of Khyber Pakhtunkhwa from September 2024 to October 2025 and notably served as Minister of Health for Khyber Pakhtunkhwa since March 2024 until a reshuffle in the Gandapur ministry. He has also been serving as a member of the Provincial Assembly of Khyber Pakhtunkhwa since February 2024 from the seat PK-81 Peshawar-X.

== Early life and education ==
Qasim holds a master's degree in economics and is a businessman by profession. He also belongs to a prominent political family from Peshawar.

== Political career ==
=== Early career ===
He entered politics as a youth member of the Pakistan Tehreek-e-Insaf (PTI) and became Secretary General of the PTI Youth Wing in 2013. He contested in the 2015 Khyber Pakhtunkwa local elections. He contested in the 2024 general elections as a Pakistan Tehreek-e-Insaf-backed Independent candidate from PK-81 Peshawar-X. He won and secured 44,310 votes while the runner-up was Arslan Khan Nazim of ANP who secured 8,177 votes. He was then made Provincial Health Minister for Khyber Pakhtunkhwa in the Gandapur ministry.

=== Minister of Health ===
As Provincial Health Minister for Khyber Pakhtunkhwa, Syed Qasim Ali Shah announced the restoration of the Sehat Insaf Card in March 2024, after it had been suspended by the previous caretaker government due to a lack of funds. Shah claimed that 1,800 different medical treatments were made available for free in 118 public and private hospitals catering to different specialties in the province. Under Shah, the government prioritized mental health by aiming to adopt a new policy. In July 2024, the Health Department increased rates of cardiac procedures under the Sehat Card Plus Program by 40% citing rising medical costs. He was reshuffled to the portfolio of Minister for Social Welfare and Women Empowerment in September 2024.

=== Minister of Social Welfare ===
As Provincial Minister of Social Welfare and Women Empowerment for Khyber Pakhtunkhwa, Syed Qasim Ali Shah intervened to re-open a closed women’s park in Shalimar Park. In December 2024, the three-member Pakistan Tehreek-e-Insaf (PTI) Accountability Committee summoned Syed Qasim Ali Shah over charges of corruption and abuse of power following complaints during his time as both Health Minister and Social Welfare Minister.
