= Meena Khan =

Pakistani politician

Meena Khan Afridi

Provincial Minister for Local Government, Elections and Rural Development
- In office 31 October 2025 – 11 October 2026
- Governor: Faisal Karim Kundi
- Chief Minister: Sohail Afridi
- Preceded by: Arshad Ayub Khan
- Succeeded by: Governor Rule

Provincial Minister of Higher Education, Archives and Libraries for Khyber Pakhtunkhwa
- In office 7 March 2024 – 13 October 2025
- Chief Minister: Ali Amin Gandapur
- Succeeded by: Arshad Ayub Khan

Member of the Provincial Assembly of Khyber Pakhtunkhwa
- Incumbent
- Assumed office 29 February 2024
- Constituency: PK-83 Peshawar-XII

Personal details
- Born: 31 December 1990 (age 35) Peshawar District, Khyber Pakhtunkhwa, Pakistan
- Party: PTI (2024–present)

Meena Khan Afridi (born 31 December 1990) is a Pakistani politician from the Peshawar District. He served as the Provincial Minister of Higher Education, Archives and Libraries for Khyber Pakhtunkhwa from 7 March 2024 to 13 August 2025. He has also been a member of the Provincial Assembly of Khyber Pakhtunkhwa from the Pakistan Tehreek-e-Insaf since 29 February 2024.

== Early life and education ==
He was born on 31 December 1990 and holds a Bachelor of Science (B.S) Economics Degree from the University of Peshawar.

== Political career ==
He contested the 2024 Khyber Pakhtunkhwa provincial election as a Pakistan Tehreek-e-Insaf/Independent candidate from PK-83 Peshawar-XII. He was elected member and secured 38,117 votes while the runner-up was Samar Haroon Bilour of Awami National Party who secured 33,500 votes. He was then inducted into the Gandapur ministry as Provincial Minister of Higher Education, Archives and Libraries for Khyber Pakhtunkhwa on 7 March 2024. As minister, a notification by the University of Peshawar to Meena Khan caused controversy.
