= Mahmood Khan provincial government =

Cabinet of Khyber Pakhtunkhwa, (c. 2018–23)

Mahmood Khan cabinet
- Cabinet of Khyber Pakhtunkhwa, Pakistan
- 2018 - 2023
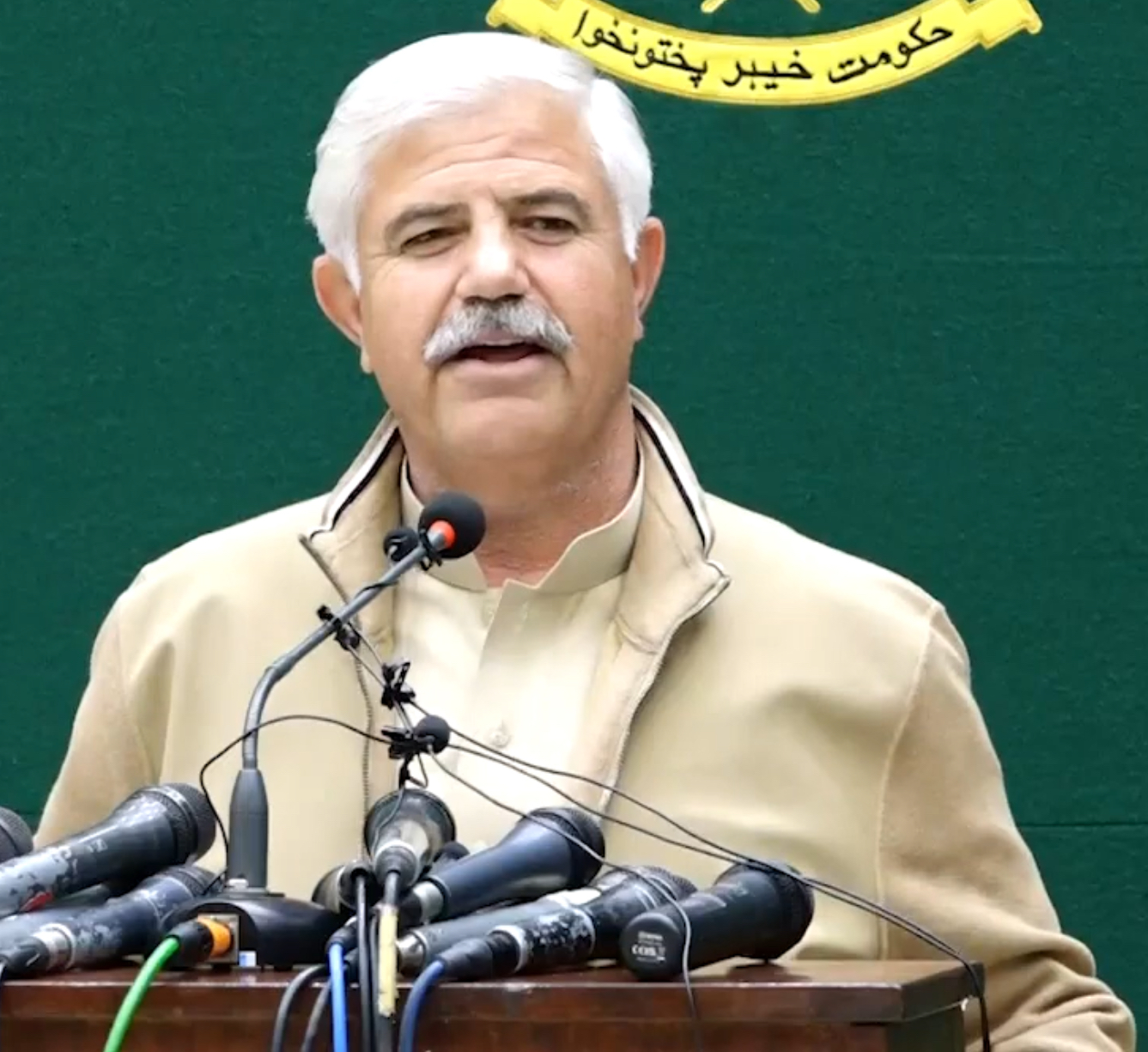
- Date formed: 29 August 2018
- Date dissolved: 21 January 2023

People and organisations
- Governor: Shah Farman (2018 – 2022); Haji Ghulam Ali (2022 – 2024)
- Chief Minister: Mahmood Khan
- Senior Minister: Atif Khan (2018 - 2020)
- Total no. of members: 26
- Member parties: Pakistan Tehreek-e-Insaf
- Status in legislature: Khyber Pakhtunkhwa Assembly 95 / 145 (66%)
- Opposition party: MMA/JUI
- Opposition leader: Akram Khan Durrani

History
- Election: 2018 KPK elections
- Predecessor: Pervez Khattak cabinet
- Successor: Ali Amin Gandapur cabinet

The Mahmood Khan provincial government was the governing cabinet of Khyber Pakhtunkhwa from 29 August 2018 to 21 January 2023, led by Chief Minister Mahmood Khan. The government ended its term after the provincial assembly was dissolved to make way for snap elections; Mahmood Khan stepped down and civil servant Muhammad Azam Khan became caretaker chief minister.

== Election and cabinet formation ==
On 16 August 2018, following general and provincial elections that year, PTI candidate Mahmood Khan was elected Chief Minister by the Khyber Pakhtunkhwa assembly. Khan received 77 votes in the assembly, while his opponent, Nisar Gul of the MMA received 33.

16 August 2018
Candidate	Party	Votes Obtained
Mahmood Khan	Pakistan Tehreek-e-Insaf	77
Mian Nisar Gul	Muttahida Majlis-e-Amal	33

Following his election, Khan announced a cabinet of 11 members, sworn in on August 29. An additional two advisors and two special assistants were sworn in on 13 September. In 2023 the number of advisors was again increased by four.

== Cabinet ==
List of Ministers
S.No	Minister	Post	Party	Term
1	Mahmood Khan, MPA	Chief Minister, Khyber Pakhtunkhwa	PTI	2018 – 2023
2	Atif Khan, MPA	Food; Science & Technology; Information Technology	PTI	2018 – 2023
3	Taimur Saleem Khan Jhagra, MPA	Finance; Health	PTI	2018 – 2023
4	Syed Muhammad Ishtiaq, MPA	Environment, Forest and Wildlife	PTI	2018 – 2023
5	Mohibullah Khan, MPA	Agriculture; Livestock; Fisheries; Cooperatives	PTI	2018 – 2023
6	Dr. Amjad Ali, MPA	Housing	PTI	2018 – 2023
7	Shaukat Ali Yousafzai, MPA	Labour; Culture	PTI	2018 – 2023
8	Muhammad Iqbal Wazir, MPA	Relief & Rehabilitation	PTI	2018 – 2023
9	Malik Shah Mohammad, MPA	Transport	PTI	2018 – 2023
10	Shahram Khan Tarakai, MPA	Elementary & Secondary Education	PTI	2018 – 2023
11	Anwar Zeb Khan, MPA	Zakat & Ushr	PTI	2018 – 2023
12	Fazal e Shakoor Khan, MPA	Law; Parliamentary Affairs; Human Rights	PTI	2018 – 2023
13	Shakeel Ahmad Khan, MPA	Public Health Engineering	PTI	2018 – 2023
14	Kamran Khan Bangash, MPA	Higher Education; Archives & Libraries; Information & Public Relations	PTI	2018 – 2023
15	Faisal Amin Khan, MPA	Local Government; Elections; Rural Development	PTI	2018 – 2023
16	Arshad Ayub Khan, MPA	Irrigation	PTI	2018 – 2023
← Pervez Khattak Cabinet		Ali Amin Gandapur Cabinet →		

List of Advisors
S.No	Name	Designation	Department	Party
1	Khaliq Ur Rehman, MPA	Advisor to CM	Excise & Taxation	PTI
2	Riaz Khan, MPA	Advisor to CM	Communication & Works	PTI
3	Mohammad Arif, MPA	Advisor to CM	Mines & Minerals Development	PTI
4	Muhammad Zahoor, MPA	Advisor to CM	Auqaf; Hajj & Religious Affairs	PTI

List of Special Assistants
S.No	Name	Designation	Department	Party
1	Barrister Dr. Muhammad Ali Saif, MPA	Special Assistant to CM	Information & Public Relations	PTI
2	Abdul Karim Khan, MPA	Special Assistant to CM	Industry & Commerce	PTI
3	Ahmad Hussain Shah, MPA	Special Assistant to CM	Population Welfare	PTI
4	Wazeer Zada, MPA	Special Assistant to CM	Minority Affairs	PTI
5	Taj Muhammad Tarand, MPA	Special Assistant to CM	Power	PTI
6	Shafiullah Khan, MPA	Special Assistant to CM	Prison	PTI

== See also ==
- Mahmood Khan
- Government of Khyber Pakhtunkhwa
