= Aftab Alam Afridi =

Pakistani politician

Provincial Minister of Law, Parliamentary Affairs & Human Rights for Khyber Pakhtunkhwa
- Incumbent
- Assumed office 31 October 2025
- Governor: Faisal Karim Kundi
- Chief Minister: Sohail Afridi
- In office 7 March 2024 – 13 October 2025
- Governor: Haji Ghulam Ali; Faisal Karim Kundi
- Chief Minister: Ali Amin Gandapur

Member of the Provincial Assembly of Khyber Pakhtunkhwa
- Incumbent
- Assumed office 29 February 2024
- Constituency: PK-90 Kohat-I

Personal details
- Born: Kohat District, Khyber Pakhtunkhwa, Pakistan
- Party: PTI (2010-present)

Aftab Alam Afridi is a Pakistani politician from the Kohat District. He is currently serving as a Member of the Provincial Assembly of Khyber Pakhtunkhwa since February 2024. He was also the Provincial Minister of Law, Parliamentary Affairs and Human Rights in the Gandapur ministry.

== Early life and education ==
He was born on 1 January 1984 in Kohat, Khyber Pakhtunkhwa. He received a Bachelor of Laws (L.L.B) Degree from the University of Peshawar and became a lawyer by profession.

== Political career ==
He entered politics in 2010 as a member of the Pakistan Tehreek-e-Insaf (PTI). He contested the 2024 Khyber Pakhtunkhwa provincial election as a PTI-backed Independent candidate from PK-90 Kohat-I. Following this, he was inducted into the Gandapur ministry as Provincial Minister of Law, Parliamentary Affairs and Human Rights.

He has inaugurated two projects including a girls primary school and the Shadikhel-Mandakhel-Kamalkhel Road as provincial minister. He also emphasized the importance of women in education. As law minister, Aftab Alam announced that a letter had been sent by him and the cabinet to the Peshawar High Court (PHC) to enact a judicial probe into the May 9 incidents.
