= PK-90 Kohat-I =

Pakistani electoral district

- Constituency for the Khyber Pakhtunkhwa Assembly
- Region: former Dara Adam Khel Tehsil and Kohat Tehsil (partly) of Kohat District

Current constituency
- Party: Pakistan Tehreek-e-Insaf
- Member: Aftab Alam Afridi
- Created from: PK-37 Kohat-I (2002-2018); PK-80 Kohat-I (2018-2023)

PK-90 Kohat-I (پی کے-90 کوہاٹ-1) is a constituency for the Khyber Pakhtunkhwa Assembly of the Khyber Pakhtunkhwa province of Pakistan.

== See also ==
- PK-89 Nowshera-V
- PK-91 Kohat-II
