= Sohail Afridi =

Chief Minister Of Khyber Pakhtunkhwa from 2025 to 2026

- سہیل آفریدی
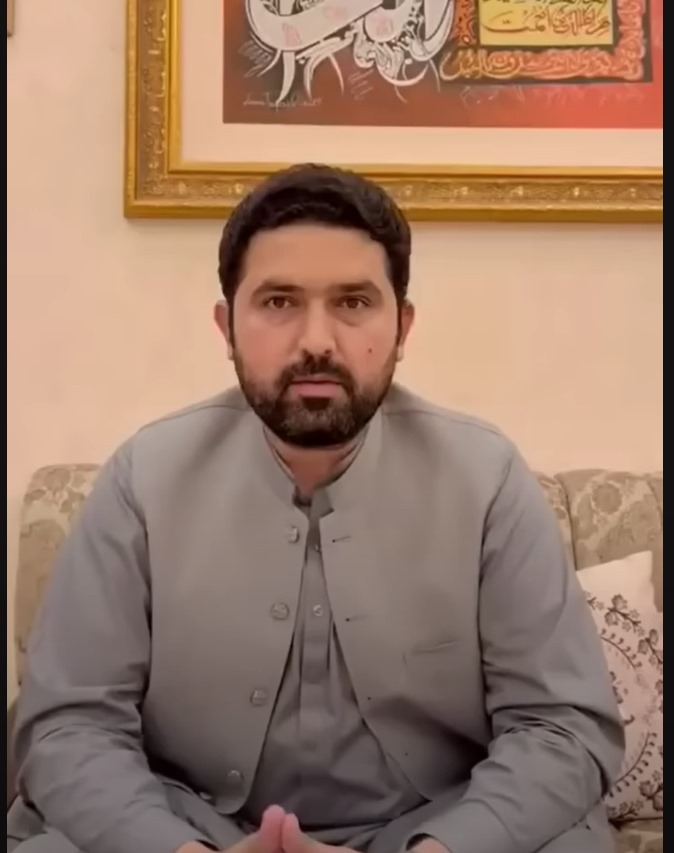
- Afridi in 2025

Chief Minister of Khyber Pakhtunkhwa
- Incumbent
- Assumed office 15 October 2025
- Governor: Faisal Kundi
- Preceded by: Ali Amin Gandapur
- Succeeded by: Faisal Kundi (Governor's Rule)

Special Assistant to the Chief Minister of Khyber Pakhtunkhwa for Communication & Works
- In office 7 October 2024 – 8 October 2025
- Preceded by: Shakeel Ahmad

Member of the Provincial Assembly of Khyber Pakhtunkhwa
- Incumbent
- Assumed office 29 February 2024
- Constituency: PK-70 Khyber-II

Personal details
- Born: 12 July 1989 (age 37) Bara, FATA, Pakistan
- Party: PTI (2015-present)
- Education: University of Peshawar

Muhammad Sohail Khan Afridi (Note: Urdu: محمد سہیل خان آفریدی; Pashto: محمد سهیل خان افریدی) (born 12 July 1989) is a Pakistani politician and businessman who served as the Chief Minister of Khyber Pakhtunkhwa from 15 October 2025 until the imposition of governor's rule by the federal government on 11 October 2026. He also serves as a member of the Provincial Assembly of Khyber Pakhtunkhwa from constituency PK-70 Khyber-II since 29 February 2024 and is affiliated with Pakistan Tehreek-e-Insaf (PTI).

Born in the Khyber District, Afridi began his political career as a student and became known for participating in, and getting arrested alongside Murad Saeed in a protest against Justice Syed Zahid Hussain Bukhari, the father of Punjab’s provincial minister, Azma Bukhari, who represented the criminal Raymond Davis and secured his release.

Afridi's tenure as Chief Minister of Khyber Pakhtunkhwa came to an end following the imposition of governor's rule by the federal government on 11 October 2026; Afridi was subsequently taken into custody by police. The decision came amid escalating political tensions after Afridi announced plans for a long march against the federal government, intensified his criticism of its policies, and opposed military operations in the province. Critics alleged that the move was politically motivated and aimed at weakening the party's provincial leadership, curbing its political mobilisation, and undermining provincial autonomy and democratic representation.

== Early life and education ==
Afridi was born on 12 July 1989 in Bara Tehsil, located in the Khyber District of the Federally Administered Tribal Areas (FATA), now known as Khyber Pakhtunkhwa, Pakistan. He hails from a middle-class Pashtun family belonging to the Afridi (Shalobar) tribe and is the third of six brothers. Afridi received his early education and completed his matriculation from Muslim Public School in Peshawar, followed by studies at FC Government High School. He earned a Bachelor of Science (BS) degree in economics from the University of Peshawar.

Prior to entering politics full-time, he worked in the property business.

== Political career ==
Afridi's involvement in politics began during his student years at the University of Peshawar, where he joined the Insaf Students Federation (ISF), the youth wing of Pakistan Tehreek-e-Insaf (PTI), in 2015. He was elected president of the ISF chapter at the university campus that year and later rose to become Peshawar region president in 2017, followed by provincial president of ISF Khyber Pakhtunkhwa. In this role, he mobilised youth for PTI's campaigns. He advocated for education reforms. Following the riots of 9 May 2023, Afridi maintained communication with PTI workers while much of the provincial leadership went underground.

He contested the 2024 Khyber Pakhtunkhwa election as a PTI candidate from the PK-70 Khyber-II constituency. He secured 31,669 votes while the runner-up was Bilawal Afridi of the Pakistan Muslim League (N) who secured 7,549 votes. Following his victory, he was appointed as Special Assistant for Communication and Works (C&W) for Khyber Pakhtunkhwa in the Gandapur administration. In a subsequent cabinet reshuffle, he was promoted to Provincial Minister for Higher Education.

== Chief Minister of Khyber Pakhtunkhwa (2025–2026) ==
After Ali Amin Gandapur resigned on 8 October 2025 as Chief Minister of Khyber Pakhtunkhwa on Imran Khan's orders, Salman Akram Raja confirmed that Afridi had been named as the next chief minister of the province by Imran Khan.

On 13 October 2025, Afridi was elected as Chief Minister after securing 90 votes in the 145-seat Provincial Assembly of Khyber Pakhtunkhwa, while three other candidates of the opposition received none.

A brief political crisis arose due to Governor Faisal Karim Kundi's refusal to accept Gandapur's resignation. The crisis was ended by the Peshawar High Court (PHC), when it ruled that Gandapur's resignation took effect when he tendered it, and was further confirmed through his speech on the floor of the Provincial Assembly. The court also ordered Kundi to administer the oath of office to Afridi on 15 October 2025. The ruling also stated that Babar Saleem Swati, the Speaker of the Provincial Assembly, may administer the oath in case of Kundi fails to do so.

On 15 October 2025, Afridi was administered the oath of office by Governor Kundi at the Governor's House, thus beginning his tenure as the province's Chief Minister.

After swearing in as the Chief Minister, Afridi took positions critical of the federal government at the centre. He opposed military operations in Khyber Pakhtunkhwa. Afridi also criticised the federal government for the resurgence of militancy in the province, blaming it on "flawed policies of the federal government" and delays in releasing war-on-terror funds and constitutional dues. Afridi rejected faulty bulletproof vehicles provided by the centre, calling them old, substandard, and insulting to the KP police, and ordered their return during his first formal cabinet meeting in Peshawar.

Additionally, he sought to meet Imran Khan in Adiala Jail for consultation on formation of his cabinet. The prison authorities initially rejected the request. In response, Afridi reportedly moved the Islamabad High Court (IHC) just two days after being sworn in. Afridi was prevented from meeting Imran Khan despite an IHC order directing jail authorities to allow such meetings twice a week. His convoy was stopped by the police at the Dahgal checkpoint near the facility. In response, the chief minister staged a brief sit-in outside the jail.

On 31 October 2025, Afridi announced a 13-member cabinet, comprising 10 provincial ministers, two advisers, and one special assistant, all administered oath by Governor Faisal Karim Kundi at the Governor's House in Peshawar. Advisers were Muzzammil Aslam (Finance) and Taj Muhammad (Environment), with Shafi Ullah Jan as Special Assistant for Tourism. Afridi delayed the announcement until after attempting to consult Imran Khan in Adiala Jail.

During his tenure, Afridi has prioritised peace restoration and development in merged tribal districts. In November 2025, he convened the Khyber Pakhtunkhwa Grand Peace Jirga at the Provincial Assembly, where political parties and tribal elders issued a unanimous declaration against militancy, laying groundwork for a provincial peace strategy. He has advocated for enhanced police capabilities, including modern weapons, bulletproof vehicles, and anti-drone technology, while criticising federal delays in releasing NFC shares and development funds for former FATA areas (estimated at PKR 3,000 billion). Afridi inaugurated the 40.8 MW Koto Hydropower Project in Lower Dir in late 2025 to boost energy infrastructure. He has reiterated that military operations alone cannot eradicate terrorism and emphasised Imran Khan's policies as key to sustainable peace.

On 27 November 2025, police allegedly manhandled him during an overnight sit-in, dragging him by the hair and pushing him to the ground, reportedly on army directions; videos of the incident circulated widely, though authenticity was unverified. Afridi accused authorities of isolating Khan and violating court orders, warning of street protests if unresolved. The federal government considered imposing Governor's Rule in KP amid these tensions and Afridi's calls for protests.

In November 2025, the Election Commission of Pakistan (ECP) issued notices to Afridi for "irresponsible" remarks during a rally for the NA-18 Haripur by-election, alleging he threatened district administration, police, and ECP staff, violating the Elections Act 2017 and code of conduct. Afridi clarified his comments were "taken out of context" and challenged the ECP's jurisdiction in Peshawar High Court, calling the notice "malicious." The ECP sought army deployment for the by-poll due to these concerns.

Afridi has also accused the federal government of staging "fake" terrorist attacks in KP to sabotage peace efforts and advance a political agenda, amid a surge in violence near the Afghan border. In December 2025, he warned against "meddling" by unelected individuals in provincial governance, linking it to institutional failures exacerbating terrorism.

In September 2026, Afridi claimed that he was "abducted" by the Lahore authorities in a police van and later "thrown" by the roadside although the Punjab Information minister denied it. He was attempting to secure the release of some detained PTI workers. KP Minister for Information Shafi Jan alleged that Afridi was "separated" from his security detail and forcibly moved into another vehicle. Later, Afridi also claimed that that hurdles were created during his stay in Sialkot and that an "assassin" in civil clothes was sent after him.

In October 2026, Afridi announced a PTI Long March from Lakki Marwat to Islamabad. The primary goals of the march were to secure the release of PTI founder and former Prime Minister Imran Khan, ensure access to medical care and family visits for both Khan and Bushra Bibi, and initiate political negotiations with the federal government. To prevent Afridi and the marchers from entering the capital, Islamabad authorities have placed shipping containers along the city’s borders.

Afridi's tenure as Chief Minister of Khyber Pakhtunkhwa ended on 11 October 2026, after the federal government imposed governor's rule in the province. The decision came amid growing political tensions after Afridi announced a long march against the federal government and strongly criticized its policies, including military operations in the province. Pakistan Tehreek-e-Insaf (PTI) leaders and supporters called the decision politically motivated, claiming that it aimed to weaken the party's provincial leadership, limit its political activities, and undermine provincial autonomy and democratic representation.

== Arrest ==
On 11 October 2026, Afridi was arrested after Pakistani president Asif Ali Zardari and prime minister Shahbaz Sharif imposed governor's rule in Khyber Pakhtunkhwa. Governor Faisal Kundi subsequently took charge as the administrator of Khyber Pakhunkhwa. The decision drew criticism from the public, who opposed federal intervention in the province's affairs and raised concerns regarding provincial autonomy and the constitutional rights of its elected government.

Afridi was taken into custody from the Chief Minister’s House after arrangements had been completed and the Red Zone sealed by around 5 am. He was alone inside his locked room when the door was broken open and two officers entered. After 30 to 40 minutes of "conversation," Afridi was subsequently taken into custody and moved to an "undisclosed location."

Senior journalist Mazhar Abbas questioned the justification for targeting the Afridi government. Abbas said the issue was not the rise in terrorism in Khyber Pakhtunkhwa but the politicisation of terrorism against PTI. He alleged that the security situation was being used as a pretext to target the party.

Former Senior Justice and activist Wajihuddin Ahmed said there was "no provision in law allowing the arrest of a chief minister, in any form, in such circumstances." Ahmed stated that placing both a speaker and a chief minister in custody was "unimaginable under any democratic dispensation." He said that the imposition of emergency should be questioned by the courts.

== Notes ==
Political offices
| Preceded by Ali Amin Gandapur | Chief Minister of Khyber Pakhtunkhwa; 2025 – present | Incumbent |
