= Khyber Pakhtunkhwa Department of Minerals Development =

- Seal of K.P. Government

- Flag of K.P. Government

Agency overview
- Formed: August 14, 1973; 53 years ago
- Jurisdiction: K.P. Government
- Headquarters: Peshawar; 34°01′N 71°35′E
- Agency executive: Ali Amin Gandapur, Minister of Minerals Development
- Website: Official Website

The Khyber Pakhtunkhwa Department of Minerals Development is concerned with Minerals Development in the Pakistan province of Khyber Pakhtunkhwa. It is headed by the Khyber Pakhtunkhwa Minister of Minerals Development, who is a member of the Chief Minister's Cabinet.

Amjad Ali was appointed as Minister of Minerals Development by Chief Minister of KP Mahmood Khan on August 30, 2018.
