= Pakistan Tobacco Board =

Pakistan Tobacco Board (PTB) is a statutory semi-autonomous department of Government of Pakistan under Ministry of National Food Security and Research. Pakistan Tobacco Board oversees the promotion of the cultivation, manufacture and export of tobacco and tobacco products in Pakistan.

Advisor to K-P CM on Finance Muzammil Aslam and Special Assistant to K-P CM on Industries Abdul Karim Tordher chaired a meeting in view of the federal cabinet's proposal to dissolve the Pakistan Tobacco Board (PTB) and transfer its essential functions to the federating units.

In early 2025, the federal cabinet's proposal to dissolve the PTB and transfer its functions to the provinces was being considered by at least one province to prioritize the protection of tobacco growers.
