= Syed Fakhr e Jehan =

Pakistani politician

Syed Fakher Jehan

Provincial Minister of Excise, Taxation & Narcotics Control for Khyber Pakhtunkhwa
- Incumbent
- Assumed office 31 October 2025
- Governor: Faisal Karim Kundi
- Chief Minister: Sohail Afridi

Advisor To Chief Minister Khyber Pakhtunkhwa for Sports & Youth Affairs
- In office 7 March 2024 – 13 October 2025
- Chief Minister: Ali Amin Gandapur

Member of the Provincial Assembly of Khyber Pakhtunkhwa
- Incumbent
- Assumed office 29 February 2024
- Constituency: PK-26 Buner-II
- In office 13 August 2018 – 18 January 2023
- Constituency: PK-21 (Buner-II)

Personal details
- Party: PTI (2018-present)
- Occupation: Politician

Syed Fakhr e Jehan is a Pakistani politician who had been a member of the Provincial Assembly of Khyber Pakhtunkhwa from August 2018 till January 2023. He was the second youngest member of the Assembly at the time. Beside being a legislator, he is also the advisor to chief minister Khyber Pakhtunkhwa on Sports and Youth Affairs.

== Political career ==
He was elected to the Provincial Assembly of Khyber Pakhtunkhwa as a candidate of Pakistan Tehreek-e-Insaf from Constituency PK-21 (Buner-II) in the 2018 Pakistani general election.
