= Tank Zam Dam =

Dam in Khyber Pakhtunkhwa, Pakistan

Tank Zam Dam بند ٹانک زام
- Country: Pakistan
- Location: Tank District, Khyber Pakhtunkhwa
- Construction cost: Rs. 18 billion
- Operator: WAPDA

Dam and spillways
- Type of dam: Earth fill and Rock fill

Tank Zam Dam (بند ٹانک زام ) is a proposed dam located in Tank District, Khyber Pakhtunkhwa, Pakistan.
