= Dahgal =

Village in Punjab

Daghal
- Village
- Location within Pakistan
- Coordinates: 33.49°N 73.04°E
- Country: Pakistan
- Province: Punjab (Pakistan)
- District: Rawalpindi
- Time zone: UTC+5 (PST)

Dahgal is a village of Rawalpindi District in the Punjab province of Pakistan on Adiyala road. It is located at 33.4920° N, 73.0479° E with an altitude of 418 metres and lies south of the district capital, Rawalpindi near Central Jail Rawalpindi, also known as Adiala Jail.

== Telecommunication ==
The PTCL provides the main network of landline telephone. Many ISPs and all major mobile phone, Wireless companies operating in Pakistan provide service in Dahgal.

== Languages ==
Punjabi is the main language of Dahgal. Other languages include Urdu, Pothohari and rarely spoken language Pashto.
