= Shakeel Ahmad (Pakistani politician) =

Pakistani politician from malakand batkhela

Provincial Minister of Communication & Works for Khyber Pakhtunkhwa
- In office 9 March 2024 – 16 August 2024

Provincial Minister of Revenue for Khyber Pakhtunkhwa
- In office 29 August 2018 – 26 January 2020

Member of the Provincial Assembly of Khyber Pakhtunkhwa
- Incumbent
- Assumed office 28 February 2024
- Constituency: PK-23 Malakand-I
- In office 13 August 2018 – 18 January 2023
- Constituency: PK-18 (Malakand Protected Area-I)
- In office 29 May 2013 – 28 May 2018
- Constituency: PK-99 (Malakand Protected Area-II)

Personal details
- Party: PTI (2013-present)

Shakeel Ahmad (Urdu: شکيل احمد) is a Pakistani politician who was the Provincial Minister of Khyber Pakhtunkhwa for Revenue, in office from 29 August 2018 till 26 January 2020. He is currently a member of the Provincial Assembly of Khyber Pakhtunkhwa as a member of the Pakistan Tehreek-e-Insaf since 28 February 2024. Prior to that Shakeel was a member of the Provincial Assembly of Khyber Pakhtunkhwa from 2013 to 2018 and from 2018 to 2023. He has served as the Minister for Public Health Engineering. He also served as Provincial Minister for Communication & Works in the 2024 Gandapur ministry but resigned over controversy in August 2024.

Previously, he was a member of the Provincial Assembly of Khyber Pakhtunkhwa from May 2013 to May 2018 and served as special assistant to the Chief minister on Population Welfare for the same period.

== Political career ==
He was elected to the Provincial Assembly of Khyber Pakhtunkhwa as a candidate of Pakistan Tehreek-e-Insaf (PTI) from Constituency PK-99 (Malakand Protected Area-II) in 2013 Pakistani general election. He received 27,312 votes and defeated Muhammad Humayun Khan, a candidate of Pakistan Peoples Party (PPP).

On 19 January 2013, he was inducted into the provincial Khyber Pakhtunkhwa cabinet of Chief Minister Pervez Khattak and was appointed as special assistant to the chief minister on population welfare.

He was re-elected to the Provincial Assembly of Khyber Pakhtunkhwa as a candidate of PTI from Constituency PK-18 (Malakand Protected Area-I) in 2018 Pakistani general election. On 29 August 2018, he was inducted into the provincial Khyber Pakhtunkhwa cabinet of Chief Minister Mahmood Khan and was appointed as Provincial Minister of Khyber Pakhtunkhwa for Revenue. He got the portfolio of Minister for Public Health Engineering on 20 May 2021.

He was officially appointed as Communication and Works Minister in the Gandapur ministry in March 2024. But later resigned in August 2024.

He has accused his department's secretary of releasing Rs6.87 billion to contractors without his knowledge or consent. He claimed that the funds were disbursed between May and June 2024, under the supervision of Chief Minister Ali Amin Gandapur. Khan further alleged that the secretary admitted to taking a 10-20% commission on the funds, which included payments of Rs200 million to Gandapur and Rs100 million to influential circles, all on Gandapur's orders. Additionally, Khan claimed that the secretary offered him a bribe of Rs30 million, later increased to Rs50 million, along with a new car, in exchange for his silence, but he refused and claimed he chose to expose the corruption instead. He later stated that his resignation was because of Gandapur's government backing down on its anti-establishment stance, while Gandapur's accountability panel de-notified him on Clause 3 of Article 132 of the Constitution of Pakistan.
