= Muzzammil Aslam =

Pakistani government official

Muzzammil Aslam مزمل اسلم
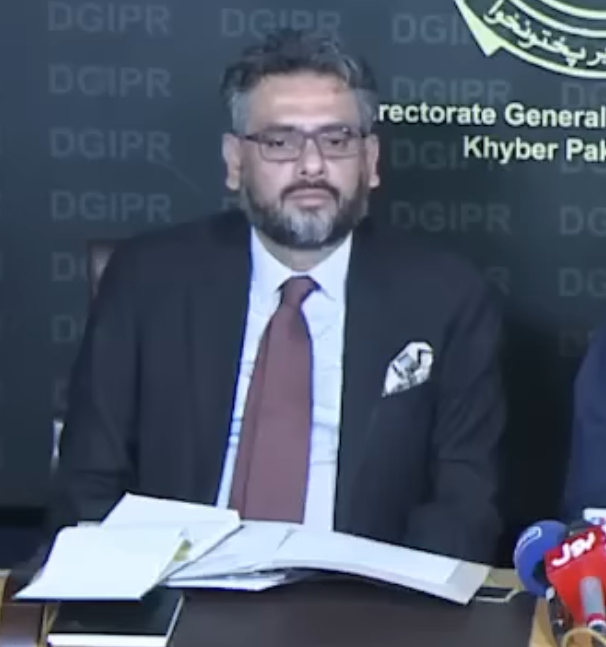

Advisor to Chief Minister of Khyber Pakhtunkhwa on Finance
- Incumbent
- Assumed office 31 October 2025
- Governor: Faisal Karim Kundi
- Chief Minister: Sohail Afridi
- In office 7 March 2024 – 13 October 2025
- Governor: Haji Ghulam Ali; Faisal Karim Kundi
- Chief Minister: Ali Amin Gandapur

Personal details
- Born: 21 May 1977 (age 49) Karachi, Sindh, Pakistan
- Party: PTI (2021-present)
- Education: University of Karachi (B Com, Master's, and MAS); University of Bath (Msc Economics)

Muzzammil Aslam (Urdu: مزمل اسلم; born 21 May 1977) is a Pakistani former government official, businessman, and financial analyst, who was advisor to the Chief Minister of Khyber Pakhtunkhwa, Ali Amin Gandapur for Finance. He was previously spokesperson for the federal Ministry of Finance in the Imran Khan government, and an adviser on finance and revenue to Imran Khan.

== Early life and education ==
Aslam is originally from Karachi and was born on 21 May 1977. He earned his Bachelor of Commerce degree from the University of Karachi and separately obtained a Master's degree in Public Administration and Applied Economics. Additionally, he has a master's degree (MSc) in economics from the University of Bath, UK.

== Career ==
In 2021, during the Pakistan Tehreek-e-Insaf (PTI) government, Aslam was appointed spokesperson for the Ministry of Finance. He was later appointed spokesperson for the Ministry of Energy while continuing his role with the Ministry of Finance. Aslam has also served as the adviser on finance and revenue to former Prime Minister Imran Khan. On 7 March 2024, he was appointed as an advisor on finance to the Chief Minister of Khyber Pakhtunkhwa, Ali Amin Gandapur.

Aslam is also engaged in the real estate and vehicle business and trades on the Pakistan Stock Exchange. He is knowledgeable in taxation matters. Through PTI's platform, Aslam has published numerous economic surveys. He has also spoken at both local and international economic conferences.
