= Sehat Sahulat Program =

Pakistan's national social health insurance programme

Federal Sehat Sahulat Program
- Abbreviation: FSSP
- Formation: 2015; 11 years ago
- Founder: Government of Khyber Pakhtunkhwa under the Pakistan Tehreek-e-Insaf-led provincial government
- Type: Government social health insurance programme
- Purpose: Providing financial protection and cash-free inpatient care to low-income and vulnerable households
- Owner: Government of Pakistan
- Parent organization: Ministry of National Health Services, Regulations and Coordination
- Website: pmhealthprogram.gov.pk

The Federal Sehat Sahulat Programme (FSSP) also called the Sehat Card, is one of Pakistan's major social health protection initiatives, aimed at providing free health services to all citizens, offering a framework for social health protection and access to secondary and tertiary healthcare services.

The origins of the Sehat Sahulat Programme can be traced to Khyber Pakhtunkhwa, where the Pakistan Tehreek-e-Insaf (PTI)-led provincial government launched the Sehat Sahulat Programme on 15 December 2015. The programme was inaugurated by then Chief Minister Pervez Khattak in Peshawar and initially covered four districts Chitral, Kohat, Malakand and Mardan. The initiative was developed with financial and technical support from the German development bank KfW, and was intended to provide health insurance coverage and cash-free medical treatment to poor and vulnerable households.

Later in the same month, on 31 December 2015, Prime Minister Nawaz Sharif launched the separate Prime Minister's National Health Programme (PMNHP) in Islamabad. The federal programme was designed to provide free medical treatment to poor and vulnerable households through designated public and private hospitals. It was initially launched in 15 districts, with plans for expansion to 23 districts.

Thus, the provincial Sehat Sahulat Programme launched in Khyber Pakhtunkhwa on 15 December 2015 preceded the federal Prime Minister's National Health Programme launched by Nawaz Sharif on 31 December 2015. The two initiatives were separate programmes operated at provincial and federal levels, respectively, although both sought to provide financial protection and access to hospital treatment for low-income and vulnerable populations.

The subsequent expansion and development of these health protection initiatives contributed to the broader evolution of Pakistan's social health protection system, including the Sehat Sahulat Programme and the Federal Sehat Sahulat Programme.

== Background ==
Pakistan has historically faced challenges in healthcare financing. High out-of-pocket expenditures, limited access to specialised care in rural areas, and the financial burden of tertiary care have left large sections of the population vulnerable to catastrophic medical expenses. In 2015, the PML-N government recognised the need for a national social health insurance mechanism to reduce financial barriers and improve access to essential healthcare services.

The PMNHP was conceived as a welfare-driven initiative to provide free inpatient treatment to low-income families through health cards, facilitating services in empanelled hospitals across the country.

== Launch and Early Implementation (2015–2016) ==
Prime Minister Nawaz Sharif officially launched the Prime Minister’s National Health Programme on 31 December 2015. The program initially covered families living below the poverty line, identified through the Benazir Income Support Programme (BISP) and National Socio-Economic Registry (NSER) database.

Key features of the initial programme:

- Cash-free inpatient treatment for low-income households
- Coverage for surgeries, maternity care, chronic diseases, cancer treatment, and emergency services
- Partnership with selected public and private hospitals (empanelled hospital network)
- Financial coverage limits per family, reducing catastrophic out-of-pocket medical expenses
- Health insurance cards issued to eligible households

The program was piloted in select districts with planned phased expansion, prioritising districts with high poverty rates and limited access to tertiary healthcare facilities.

== Evolution and Renaming (2018–2019) ==
After the 2018 general elections, the PMNHP was restructured and renamed by Imran Khan led PTI-government as Sehat Sahulat Programme which later named as Sehat Card.

== Structure and Administration ==
The Federal Sehat Sahulat Program operates as a government-administered social health insurance scheme, involving multiple institutions:

- Eligibility & Enrolment: Beneficiaries are identified using BISP and NSER poverty data. NADRA issues health insurance cards to eligible families.
- Service Coverage: Cash-free inpatient hospital care includes maternity services, surgeries, emergency care, treatment for chronic and severe diseases (cancer, cardiovascular, renal, neuro-surgical care), dialysis, and specialised procedures.
- Administration: The programme is funded by the Government of Pakistan and managed with third-party administrators, primarily State Life Insurance Corporation of Pakistan (SLIC), overseeing reimbursements, hospital contracts, and benefit monitoring.
- Hospital Network: Both public and private tertiary hospitals participate, providing services to eligible cardholders.

== Beneficiaries ==
As of 2023, the programme has enrolled:

- Tens of millions of individuals have been enrolled across different provinces.
- Millions of inpatient treatments delivered in empanelled hospitals
- Special focus on vulnerable groups, including women, children, elderly, and chronically ill patients

== Impact ==
The Federal Sehat Sahulat Program has been associated with increased healthcare utilisation on healthcare accessibility and financial protection:

- Reduced out-of-pocket spending for low-income households
- Increased access to tertiary and specialised healthcare services
- Strengthened collaboration between federal and provincial governments
- Increased utilisation of public hospitals while incentivising private hospital participation
- Contributed to Pakistan's progress toward Universal health coverage and Sustainable Development Goals related to health

== Timeline ==
- 2015: PMNHP launched by Prime Minister Nawaz Sharif (PML-N)
- 2016–2017: Pilot phase in selected districts, initial enrolment and hospital network establishment
- 2018: Programme reviewed and prepared for expansion under renamed Sehat Sahulat Programme
- 2019: Renamed to Sehat Insaf Card
- 2020–2022: Coverage expanded to additional provinces and regions
- 2023: Federal institutionalisation as Federal Sehat Sahulat Program with over 43 million families enrolled

== See also ==
- Healthcare in Pakistan
- Universal health coverage
- Health insurance
