= Ali Amin Gandapur =

Pakistani politician

- علی امین گنڈا پور
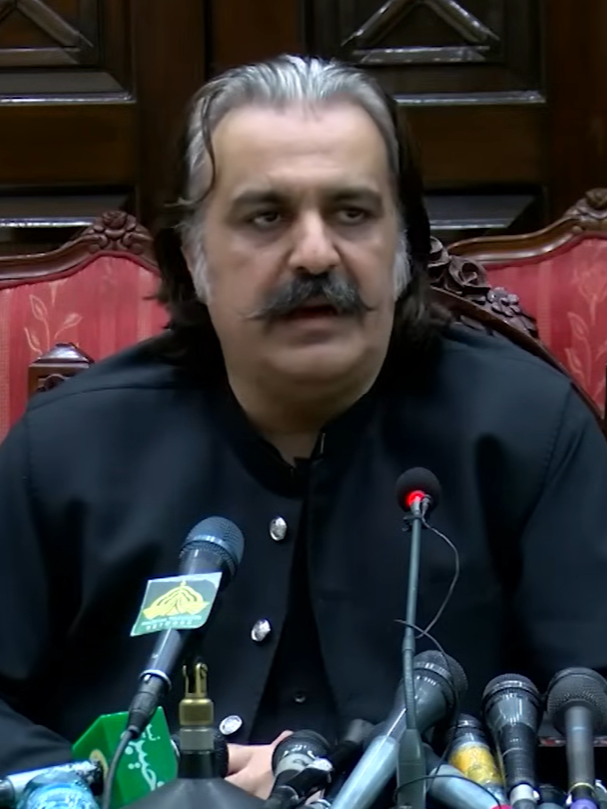
- Gandapur in 2024

18th Chief Minister of Khyber Pakhtunkhwa
- In office 2 March 2024 – 15 October 2025
- Governor: Haji Ghulam Ali; Faisal Karim Kundi
- Preceded by: Arshad Hussain Shah (caretaker)
- Succeeded by: Sohail Afridi

Federal Minister of Kashmir Affairs and Gilgit-Baltistan
- In office 5 October 2018 – 10 April 2022
- President: Arif Alvi
- Prime Minister: Imran Khan
- Preceded by: Roshan Khursheed Bharucha (caretaker)
- Succeeded by: Qamar Zaman Kaira (as Advisor)

Member of the National Assembly of Pakistan
- In office 13 August 2018 – 17 January 2023
- Constituency: NA-38 (Dera Ismail Khan-I)

Provincial Minister of Khyber Pakhtunkhwa for Revenue and Estate
- In office 17 June 2013 – 28 May 2018
- Governor: Shaukatullah Khan; Mehtab Abbasi; Iqbal Zafar Jhagra
- Chief Minister: Pervez Khattak
- Preceded by: Sameen Jan Babar (caretaker)
- Succeeded by: Muqadas Shah (caretaker)

Member of the Provincial Assembly of Khyber Pakhtunkhwa
- Incumbent
- Assumed office 28 February 2024
- Constituency: PK-113 Dera Ismail Khan-III
- In office 31 May 2013 – 28 May 2018
- Constituency: PK-64 Dera Ismail Khan-I

President of Pakistan Tehreek-e-Insaf, Khyber Pakhtunkhwa
- In office 3 June 2023 – 25 January 2025
- Chairman: Imran Khan; Gohar Ali Khan
- Preceded by: Pervez Khattak
- Succeeded by: Junaid Akbar

Personal details
- Party: PTI (2008-present)
- Relations: Faisal Amin Khan Gandapur (brother)
- Education: Saint Helen’s Public School DI Khan; Police Public School Peshawar; Government College University, Lahore (FSc); National College of Arts; Gomal University (BA)

Sardar Ali Amin Khan Gandapur (Note: Urdu: سردار علی امین خان گنڈا پور) is a Pakistani politician who served as the 18th Chief Minister of Khyber Pakhtunkhwa from March 2024 to October 2025. He also served as the Federal Minister for Kashmir Affairs and Gilgit-Baltistan from 5 October 2018 to 10 April 2022. He had been a member of the National Assembly of Pakistan from August 2018 till January 2023.

Previously, he was a member of the Provincial Assembly of Khyber Pakhtunkhwa from 2013 to 2018 and served as Provincial Minister of Khyber Pakhtunkhwa for Revenue for the same period of time. He contested his first election in 2013, winning in PK-94 Dera Ismail Khan, he would win again later on in 2018. He contested 2 seats, PK-97 Dera Ismail Khan City 1, and NA-38, winning both seats. In 2024, he was elected again to a seat in the Provincial Assembly, winning in PK-113 Dera Ismail Khan.

== Early life and education ==
Born in 1978 as Sardar Ali Amin Khan Gandapur, he belongs to a politically active Gandapur tribe of Pashtuns from Kulachi, Dera Ismail Khan. His father Aminullah Gandapur served as a caretaker cabinet member under Pervez Musharraf.

Gandapur received his early education from Saint Helen's Public School in his hometown, while he matriculated from Police Public School in Peshawar. He did his intermediate studies from Government College University, Lahore and graduated from the National College of Arts, Lahore, majoring in fashion design. He then attended Gomal University for his Bachelor's (Hons) degree.

== Political career ==
He became a member of the Pakistan Tehreek-e-Insaf (PTI) in 2007, and was elected as the party's South Khyber Pakhtunkhwa region President in the 2013 intra-party elections.

He was elected to the Provincial Assembly of Khyber Pakhtunkhwa as a candidate of Pakistan Tehreek-e-Insaf (PTI) from the PK-64 (Dera Ismail Khan-I) in the 2013 Khyber Pakhtunkhwa provincial election. He received 14,047 votes and defeated an independent candidate, Qayyum Nawaz.

Following his successful election, he was inducted into the provincial Khyber Pakhtunkhwa cabinet of Chief Minister Pervez Khattak and was made Provincial Minister of Khyber Pakhtunkhwa for Revenue and Estate.

He was elected to the National Assembly of Pakistan as a candidate of PTI from Constituency NA-38 (Dera Ismail Khan-I) in the 2018 Pakistani general election.

On 5 October 2018, he was inducted into the federal cabinet of Prime Minister Imran Khan and was appointed Federal Minister for Kashmir Affairs and Gilgit-Baltistan, a position which he served until 10 April 2022.

== Chief Minister of Khyber Pakhtunkhwa (2024-2025) ==
He was elected to the Provincial Assembly of Khyber Pakhtunkhwa a second time in the 2024 Khyber Pakhtunkhwa provincial election, running on an independent ticket affiliated with the Pakistan Tehreek-e-Insaf. Following his successful election as a Member of the Provincial Assembly (MPA), he was voted in as Chief Minister of Khyber Pakhtunkhwa by a majority of 90 votes with the runner-up, Ibadullah Khan, receiving 16.

As Chief Minister, Gandapur expressed commitment to resuming the province's development initiatives. He has prioritized the restoration and expansion of the Sehat Insaf Card for public welfare and highlighted the establishment of lasting peace as a top priority. Gandapur has also pledged to work with the federal government to safeguard the province's rights.

On 8 October 2025, he tendered his resignation from the position of Chief Minister. Later, a political crisis arose in Khyber Pakhtunkhwa. On 14 October, the crisis came to an end when the Peshawar High Court (PHC) ruled that the post of Chief Minister became vacant when Gandapur tendered his resignation, further confirmed by his speech on the floor of the Provincial Assembly on 13 October.

=== Healthcare ===
Within the first 10 days in office, on 12 March 2024, Ali Amin Gandapur and his government restored medical facilities under the Sehat Insaf Card after it had been suspended for almost a year by the previous caretaker government due to a lack of funds. In September 2024, free healthcare coverage under the Sehat Insaf Card was restored again after the State Life Insurance Company temporarily discontinued it due to the Khyber Pakhtunkhwa government's failure to clear dues. The facility was resumed following the government's assurance to pay Rs6 billion to the company.

The government announced a social protection life insurance facility to be added into the Sehat Insaf Card's Plus Program. The life insurance scheme is the Pakistan Tehreek-e-Insaf (PTI) government's second major social security initiative after the Sehat Insaf Card, offering compensation of Rs500,000 to Rs1,000,000 to the heirs of deceased family heads. Additionally, a ‘stringent’ crackdown on drugs was ordered by Gandapur, as part of an anti-drug plan under which 2,397 drug addicts were rehabilitated with 2,000 more planned in Peshawar and seizures of illegal drugs.

In January 2025, it was reported that only 15 percent (Rs 5.29 billion) was spent from the 2024 health budget of Rs 232 bn, in the first half of the fiscal year. In addition, the Sehat Card continued to face Rs 12 billion in unpaid dues, while a proposed air ambulance project "remained buried in bureaucratic red tape". An anyonmous healthcare official said that "[d]espite claims of universal health coverage, many people in KP are still struggling to avail even basic healthcare. KP and its merged areas still lack Basic Health Units and District Headquarter Hospitals hence compelling people to shift their patients to Peshawar for treatment." Expansion of specialized cardiac care beyond Peshawar has "gone unfulfilled" according to The Express Tribune.

=== Mines and Minerals ===
In April 2025, the Gandapur government introduced The Khyber Pakhtunkhwa Mines and Minerals Bill, 2025, in the Provincial Assembly, aiming to amend the 2017 mining law by establishing a Mineral Investment Facilitation Authority, digitising licensing processes, and introducing measures against illegal mining. Chief Minister Gandapur defended the bill as necessary for curbing corruption and boosting provincial revenue, dismissing criticism as "propaganda". The proposal faced significant opposition from opposition parties, mine owners, and some within PTI, who alleged it risked undermining provincial autonomy under the 18th Amendment. Passage was linked to approval from PTI founder Imran Khan, and the bill remained pending without enactment by the end of Gandapur's tenure.

=== Infrastructure and property ===
On 17 October 2024, Gandapur and his Finance advisor, Muzzammil Aslam, approved several key development projects for Khyber Pakhtunkhwa (KPK). These flagship projects include the establishment of the province's own Islamic Takaful insurance company, a solarisation program, and a home-stay tourism scheme. Other approved projects include the construction of the Peshawar-Dera Ismail Khan Motorway, a 120-kilometre-long transmission line, the creation of a trade corridor hub, and a debt management fund. The provincial government aims to complete these initiatives by the end of 2027.

In a meeting with the KP Auqaf Department, Gandapur directed the initiation of GIS mapping and the creation of an Assets Management Unit for auqaf properties, together with a Quran Mahal in Peshawar to preserve old Qu'ran copies. In another meeting the Khyber Pakhtunkhwa Local Governments (Property Lease) Rules, 2024 was announced, extending the lease period of new "large-scale investments" of up to 90-years.

=== Local government ===
On 5 September 2024, Khyber Pakhtunkhwa Police broke up protests by local government representatives using tear gas, water cannons, and baton charges. Local representatives protested against the withholding of funds since the 2021 local elections three years ago, and a failure to give powers at the tehsil level as well as establish local government departments, despite the end of the district governments. Protestors broke the gate of the provincial assembly and began to march towards the CM's house. Protests ended after a delegation from the chief minister.

In October 2024, the Mayor of Mardan criticised the provincial government for not having "released a single penny out of our cumulative share of Rs94 billion" assigned to local governments in the Annual Development Program (ADP), adding that it had brought local services to a "standstill". CM Gandapur informed local body representatives that due to financial constraints it could not release any funds. In a meeting with the Gandapur, local leaders called off protests planned for October 30 after receiving promises of financing and amendments to tehsil laws. That month on the 20th, local government elections were held in 17 districts, with The News International reporting that polling data "pointed to a lack of public interest in the elections", one individual interviewed said they did not vote in local elections, due to a failure by local governments to deliver service. Local representatives criticised amendments in 2022 as having "rendering them ‘inefficient’ and ‘financially crippled.’"

=== Environment ===
As part of Gandapur's projects, he also began the Billion Tree Plus project which aims to curb rising deforestation in the province, the project plans to increase forest cover by 12%.

Conservationists criticised Gandapur's government for approving the clearance of over six million cubic feet of timber, the government's handling of the ecological crisis as well as alleged complicity in ecological vandalism through its deforestation plan, which drew harsh criticism from the Sarhad Conservation Network (SCN) for alarming rates of deforestation.

=== Solarization ===
Chief Minister Ali Amin Gandapur announced the KP Solar Scheme, a project to deliver free solar panels to 130,000 citizens in Khyber Pakhtunkhwa. The project was inaugurated on 15 August 2024. It included solar panels, wiring and panel stands, through online registration. Preference would be given to residences in the hotter areas of the province.

In May 2025, however, the solarization initiative stalled due to "bureaucratic hurdles", high costs, and "violations of procurement rules". After the Pakhtunkhwa Energy Development Organisation (PEDO) completed financial and technical tenders without approval of the projects PC-I, a violation of rules. The opening of bids and contracting was also without approval. The Provincial Development Working Party (PDWP) withheld PC-I approval, citing high costs, for more than three months. Meeting on April 22, the PDWP again deferred it. Project tenders were initially issued in December 2024, and technical & financial proposals opened in January 2025. The KP assembly Public Accounts Committee (PAC) also called for an inquiry into a Rs 200 million advance payment for Mardan mosque solarization. The same month, The Express Tribune reported that an anonymous source said "many logistical and technical elements were still being 'worked out,' raising doubts about the readiness of the project."

=== Anti-unemployment measures ===
To address unemployment in Khyber Pakhtunkhwa, Gandapur initiated three new welfare programs under the wing of the Ehsaas Programme. These programs include: the Ehsaas Rozgar Programme, Ehsaas Nojawan Rozgar Programme and Ehsaas Hunar Programmes. The Ehsaas Rozgar Programme and Nojawan Rozgar Programmes aim to give soft loans of Rs10 million or interest-free loans of Rs200,000 for young business owners or youth attempting to start a business. Meanwhile, the Ehsaas Hunar Programme aims to give interest-free loans of Rs500,000 for new businesses owners to curb unemployment. Additionally, Gandapur launched the Ehsaas Apna Ghar Programme initiative which allows for loans of up to Rs1.5 million for the construction or expansion of residential homes.

In February 2025, the KPK government dismissed 9,762 employees recruited during the previous caretaker tenure, mainly in the police department. The move received criticism for contributing to unemployment and taking away jobs. In May 2025, Business Recorder reported that due to a "law and order situation" and terrorism, people in the province including university graduates were "facing difficulties" in finding jobs.

=== Corruption and Accountability ===
Shakeel Khan, who served as the Communication and Works Minister in the Gandapur ministry, accused the department's secretary of disbursing Rs6.87 billion to contractors without his approval. He stated that these funds were released between May and June 2024 under the direction of Gandapur. Khan also alleged that the secretary confessed to taking a 10-20% commission on the disbursed amount, which included payments of Rs200 million to Gandapur and Rs100 million to other influential figures, all on Gandapur's instructions. Furthermore, Khan claimed that the secretary offered him a bribe of Rs30 million, later increased to Rs50 million along with a new car, in exchange for his silence, but he refused and claimed that he decided to expose the corruption.

In response to the allegations, the Pakistan Tehreek-e-Insaf (PTI) formed a three-member committee to watch over Gandapur's government. Imran Khan, PTI founder gave Gandapur a 45-day deadline to end corruption in January 2025 after a report uncovered financial corruption by officials in departments. Khan warned cabinet ministers of being held answerable and accountable for corruption after meeting with Shakeel Khan.

=== Conflicts within government ===
Following the allegations of Shakeel Khan, Gandapur was seen "sending a strong message to those criticizing his governance" by relieving Mohammad Atif Khan, Sher Ali Arbab and Junaid Akbar from their parties positions. According to The News International "Atif Khan and another PTI MNA Junaid Akbar Khan had taken a stand for the former provincial minister for communication and works Shakeel Ahmad Khan when Chief Minister Gandapur removed him from the provincial cabinet allegedly on corruption charges." According to another press media, The Express Tribune, "sources reported that Atif Khan's removal followed his public support for the dismissed Minister Shakeel Khan, while Sher Ali Arbab's refusal to sign a declaration of confidence in the Chief Minister led to his ouster." In Business Recorder, "sources said that MNAs Atif Khan, Junaid Akbar Khan, and ex-provincial minister Shakeel Khan held detailed meetings with Arif Alvi. They complained about the chief minister Ali Amin Gandapur, saying he is completely ignoring the leaders and workers who raise voice against the injustices within the party."

In July 2025, Gandapur rejected claims of intra-party divisions and called it a narrative "engineered by decision-makers" to weaken PTI, adding "[w]e may have disagreements, but our mission is united — Imran Khan's release and Pakistan's restoration". The statement was supported by party general-secretary Salman Akram Raja who was present in the same press-conference.

=== Criticism ===
The Federal government and its allies criticised Gandapur for "unilaterally" holding peace talks with the Government of Afghanistan. Aasim Sajjad Akhtar in Dawn criticised Gandapur's government for its law-and-order situation, saying the "chief minister of KP nor the prime and interior minister at the centre provide the general public with any meaningful information let alone chart out a strategy to deal with what, by any account, is a situation spiralling completely out of control."

The PTI Peshawar district party body criticized Gandapur in a communiqué that said constituencies in the area had been neglected, with funding diverted, and claimed that sanitation and sewerage had deteriorated or were in "dissary". The communiqué also claimed that real estate had "collapsed" and business activity had declined. Provincial leaders responded that mega-projects had been planned for Peshawar. The Nation criticised the KP government since May 2024 for having "passed only 30 new bills, primarily concerning government employees' perks and departmental matters rather than public welfare." And for a 28% increase in the provinces debt to Rs 680 billion, and financial "irregularities" such as the "diversion of Rs. 10 billion from the pension fund to the provincial treasury under the pretext of 'dividends.'"

== Controversies ==
=== Accusations of having paraded a girl naked ===
He was accused of being involved in a case where a girl was allegedly stripped and publicly humiliated in his village in 2017. Gandapur visited the girl and maintained that he had not supported the accused and offered to take financial responsibility of the girl.

=== Accusations of sexism ===
At several occasions, Gandapur made provocative and sexist remarks about Maryam Nawaz with aggressive language. In 2020, he remarked, "She is beautiful but she spent millions on her surgeries from the taxpayers’ money". In 2021, He referred to Maryam as a daku rani (queen of thieves) and alleged that she underwent a cosmetic surgery worth Rs80 million. He stated, "I have more to reveal, but I'll only say this to her: if we resort to slapping, she will be slapped so hard that her true face, covered by the Rs80 million surgery funded by taxpayers, will be revealed."

In March 2024, during a session of the Khyber Pakhtunkhwa provincial assembly, Sobia Shahid, faced sexual harassment and lewd gestures from male PTI members when she displayed wristwatches, symbolizing allegations against PTI leader Imran Khan for purchasing wristwatches from the state treasury at a discounted price and selling them at a higher price to make a profit. Gandapur, recently elected as the leader of the house, addressed the incident by saying "she asked for it," suggesting that Sobia Shahid should have expected such behavior beforehand when she waved the wristwatches.

=== Firearms audio leak case ===
On 29 October 2022, then Interior Minister Rana Sanaullah claimed Pakistan Tehreek-e-Insaf (PTI) was bringing arms to Islamabad during the party's two-month long march to "spread chaos". Sanaullah showed an alleged audio clip of Gandapur, who Dawn said, "is heard asking an unidentified person about the number of guns and individuals available. He also asks the other person to keep 'things and people' ready at a location near the Islamabad border." In response to Sanaullah's accusation, Gandapur said "If you beat us, what do you think, we will be carrying garlands for you?", referring to a government crackdown on 25 May. Gandapur later said in a press conference the audio leaks were meant to pressure PTI leadership and said it was "fake audio".

Gandapur was arrested on 6 April 2023 after he voluntarily surrendered to the police. He said that the police were arresting him "illegally". On 19 April 2023, an Additional District and Sessions judge granted him post-arrest bail (Rs 300,000 surety bond) in the audio leak case. A first information report (FIR) filed at Golra police station charged Gandapur under the Anti-Terrorism Act (ATA). A police investigation officer (IO) told the court that the audio had been sent to the Federal Investigation Agency (FIA) cybercrime wing for forensic analysis and that an application for Call Data Recording had been made. The IO said that Gandapur told the police that the phone on which the audio originated had been taken by someone during his arrest.

On 17 December 2024, an Islamabad sessions court rejected Gandapur's petition to cancel his arrest warrant; non-bailable arrest warrants against him were upheld on 25 February, 25 March, and 6 May due to Gandapur's "continued absence" from the court.

=== Alleged ties to the military establishment ===
Gandapur has been accused of being close or having ties with "the establishment", and being engaged in "back-door contacts" with it, previously having claimed in March that "Imran Khan will decide on reconciliation with the establishment" and stated that the establishment and state institutions “are ours”. In April he was nominated to be a part of a PTI group including Omar Ayub Khan and Shibli Faraz charged with holding talks with the Establishment and stated PTI were ready for talks. Gandapur has noted that “[w]e won't keep anything [regarding negotiations with the establishment] secret,” and “Khan sahib has given the task now. He has named the people [for negotiations]. When it happens it will come before everyone. Nothing will happen in secret.” On 3 August, Gandapur stated that "No substantial outcome emerged in the interactions [with the establishment]”, He further remarked that "The government urges us to negotiate, but we assert that you are not even the government, so what should we negotiate with you?" On 27 August, the CM stated that the Establishment contacted him to cancel a scheduled rally in Islamabad, claiming that after this he consulted Imran Khan, the rally in turn would be rescheduled to 8 September, with the party claiming a government conspiracy. Federal Information Minister Attaullah Tarar also claimed that the government had contacted Gandapur to cancel the rally. Gandapur on 25 May also stated that he had met with COAS General Asim Munir at a meeting of the SIFC to convey KPK's concerns; while clarifying that the meetings did involve Imran Khan and were limited to greetings and economic affairs.

== Arrests ==
Gandapur was charged by Islamabad Police on 31 October 2016, for allegedly carrying and exhibiting unlicensed firearms and liquor. These items were reportedly found in Gandapur's vehicle outside PTI Chairman Imran Khan's residence when he arrived for the party's scheduled capital lockdown.

In February 2024, Gandapur was declared a proclaimed offender for his alleged participation in the 2023 May 9 riots. Later, in March, an Anti-Terrorism Court issued a non-bailable warrant for his arrest.

== Notes ==
Political offices
Preceded by Arshad Hussain Shah	Chief Minister of Khyber Pakhtunkhwa; 2024 – 2025	Succeeded by Sohail Afridi
