= Chief Minister of Khyber Pakhtunkhwa =

Chief Executive & Chief Minister of government of Khyber Pakhtunkhwa SBN

- د خیبر پښتونخوا اعلی وزیر
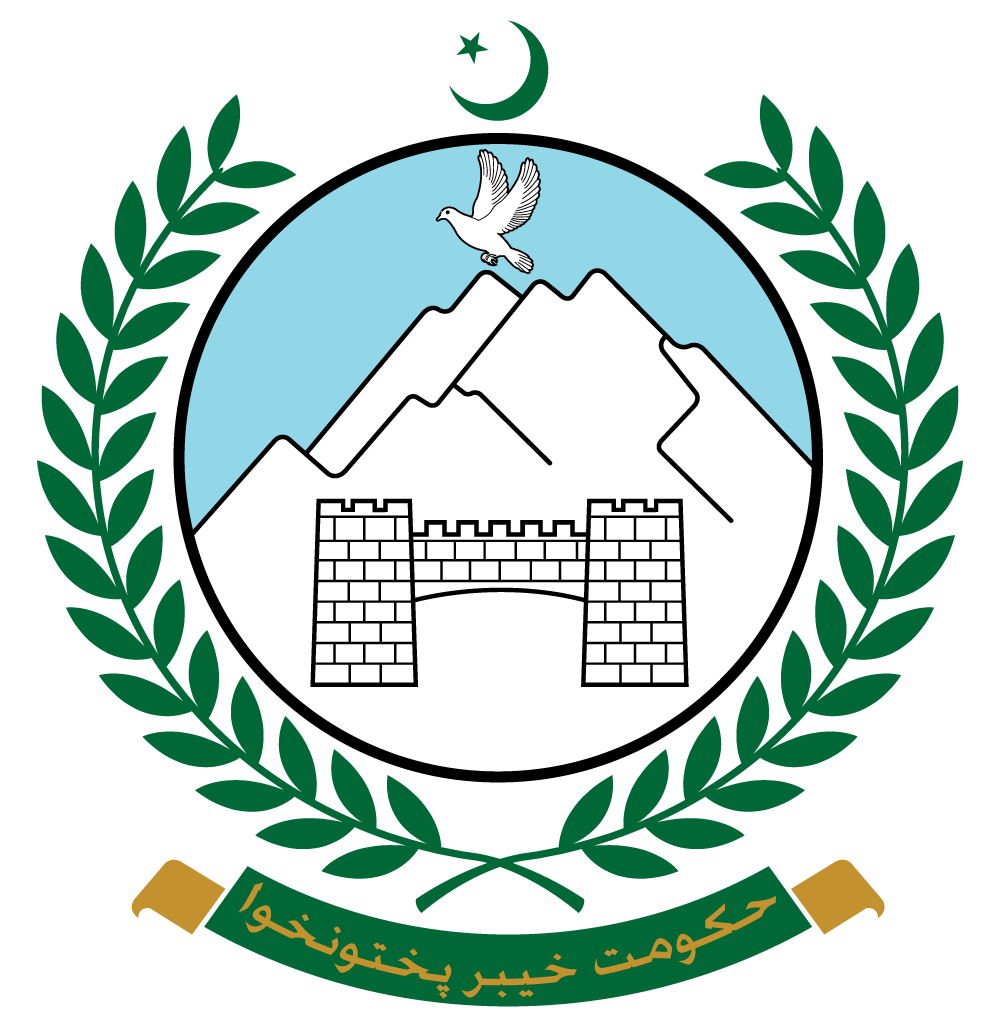
- Seal of K.P. Government

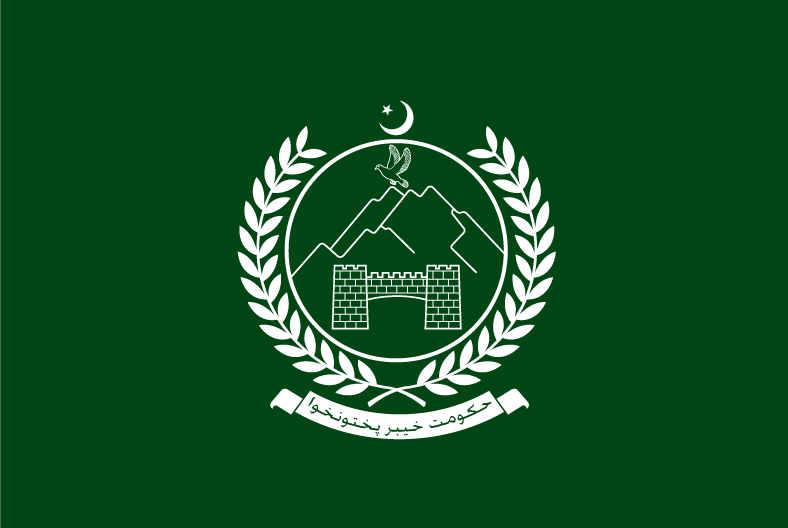
- Flag of K.P. Government
- Incumbent; Governor's rule since 11 October 2026
- Government of Khyber Pakhtunkhwa
- Style: His Excellency
- Member of: Provincial Assembly of Khyber Pakhtunkhwa; Cabinet of Khyber Pakhtunkhwa
- Reports to: Governor of Khyber Pakhtunkhwa; Provincial Assembly of Khyber Pakhtunkhwa
- Residence: Chief Minister House, Peshawar
- Seat: Peshawar
- Appointer: Assembly of Khyber Pakhtunkhwa
- Term length: Five years
- Constituting instrument: Constitution of Pakistan
- Inaugural holder: Sahibzada Abdul Qayyum
- Formation: April 1, 1937; 89 years ago
- Website: www.cmkp.gov.pk

The chief minister of Khyber Pakhtunkhwa is the head of government of the Pakistani province of Khyber Pakhtunkhwa. The chief minister leads the legislative branch of the provincial government, and is elected by the Provincial Assembly. As long as the chief minister has the confidence of the assembly, they can serve for a term of five years. There is no limit on the number of terms.

The chief minister of Khyber Pakhtunkhwa is elected by the Provincial Assembly of Khyber Pakhtunkhwa to serve as the head of the provincial government in Khyber-Pakhtunkhwa, Pakistan.

== History ==
In 1901, the North-West Frontier Province (NWFP) was declared as a Chief Commissioner Province, and, thirty-one years later, in 1932, its status was raised to that of a Governor Province, leading to the formation of the NWFP Legislative Council.

The first session of the council was summoned on 18 May 1932, under the presidentship of His Lordship Hon'ble K.B. Khan Abdul Ghafoor Khan, Khan of Zaida, at the Town Hall Abbottabad, at 9 a.m., swearing Sir Sahibzada Abdul Qayyum as the Minister for Transferred Departments.

In 1937, the Government of India Act 1935 was enforced in NWFP changing the pre set regulations which introduced the portfolio of the chief minister, abolishing the portfolio of the president.

The first session of the new parliament was summoned on 12 March 1946, under the Chairmanship of Sardar Bahadur Khan while Nawabzada Allah Nawaz Khan was elected as Speaker, and Lala Girdheri Lal was elected as Deputy Speaker on 13 March 1946. The total number of members was 50.

This Assembly was dissolved in 1951 and the number of members was increased from 50 to 58. The legislative Assembly became a Provincial Assembly through a presidential order known as Legal Framework Order, 1970.

After the restoration of the Provincial Assembly in 1970, general elections were held for the NWFP Provincial Assembly on 17 December 1970. At that time the number of member's seats in the Assembly was 43 out of which 2 seats were reserved for women and only one for minorities.

The first session of the Assembly was summoned on 2 May 1972, in the hall of Pakistan Academy for Rural Development, University Town, Peshawar. Mr. Muhammad Aslam Khan Khattak was elected as Speaker and Arbab Saifur Rehman as Deputy Speaker.

== See also ==
- Government of Pakistan
- Prime Minister of Pakistan
- Government of Khyber Pakhtunkhwa
- Governor of Khyber Pakhtunkhwa
- Chief Secretary Khyber Pakhtunkhwa
- List of chief ministers of Khyber Pakhtunkhwa
- List of current Pakistani chief ministers
- List of current Pakistani governors
- Chief Minister of Punjab
- Chief Minister of Balochistan
- Chief Minister of Sindh
- Chief Minister of Gilgit-Baltistan
- Prime Minister of Azad Jammu and Kashmir
