= Tajwal =

Pakistani administrative area

Coordinates: 34.0000°N 73.0000°E

تاجوال
- Union council
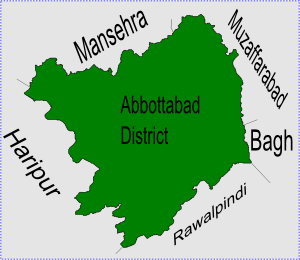
- Tajwal is located in Abbottabad District
- Interactive map of تاجوال
- Country: Pakistan
- Province: Khyber-Pakhtunkhwa
- District: Abbottabad
- Tehsil: Abbottabad

Government
  - Member District Council: Malik Muhammad Zaroof
  - Member Tehsil Council: Sardar Baba Fiaz
  - National Youth Assembly: Muhammad Ali(Member NYA)

Tajwal is one of the 51 union councils of Abbottabad District in Khyber-Pakhtunkhwa province of Pakistan. It contains an Expanded Programme on Immunization (EPI) centre. Their primary role is to provide routine immunisation services to children and mothers, helping prevent vaccine-preventable diseases such as polio, measles, hepatitis B, diphtheria, tetanus, and tuberculosis.

== Location ==
Tajwal is located in the south of the district and is in the north western part of Havelian Tehsil, it is bounded by the following union councils: Nathia Gali to the north, Palak to the east, Seer Gharbi and Nara to the south, as well as Dewal Manal and Nara to the west.

Tajwal, located in a valley, is near Changla Gali en route from Murree to Abbottabad. From Murree to Nathiagali a small stop of Changlagali with little shops and hotels. On this stop a link road lead to Tajwal, Jeeps, Texi and Toyota Hice for public transport, simple man and women travel by these transport. Some basic necessity that is water, electric, school and road has been established in this village. The Nadi Aro is a small river that divides this village from Bagan. Culture and religious factor are common element in these villages. The main tribe of this area are the Karlal.

== Subdivisions ==
The Union Council of Tajwal is subdivided into the following areas: Nowshera, Pirkot, Tajwal and Topla.
