= Lora Union Council =

Lora لورا
- Union council
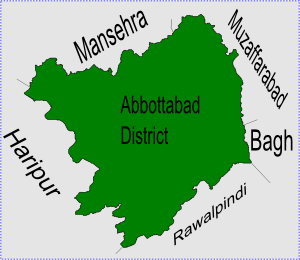
- Lora is located in Abbottabad District
- Interactive map of Lora
- Coordinates: 33°53′0″N 73°17′0″E
- Country: Pakistan
- Province: Khyber Pakhtunkhwa
- District: Abbottabad
- Tehsil: Lora

Lora is one of the 51 union councils of Abbottabad District in the Khyber Pakhtunkhwa province of Pakistan. Lora Union Council takes its name from the main village of area. The local language is Hindko but Urdu is also universally understood.

== Demography ==
According to the 2023 census the total population of the Union Council of Lora was 17,106 of which 8,342 were males and 8,764 were females. Regarding religion - 17,026 were recorded as being Muslims with 80 belong to other faiths. Lora village itself was recorded as having a total population of 7,530 of which 3,681 were male and 3,849 were female. 7,473 residents were recorded as Muslim with 57 belonging to other faiths.

== Subdivisions ==
The Union Council of Lora is subdivided into the following areas: Chabgran, Ghari, Ghora, Dheri Kiala, Lora, Kotli, Narhota, Noorpur, Seri and Thath Karam Shah, Mohra Maira, Kundbatal, Ghambeer, Phallah, Roper.

== Location ==
Lora is located in the southern part of Abbottabad District formerly part of Havelian Tehsil, it is now the headquarters of Lora Tehsil. It is bounded by the following union councils, Nara to the north, Nagri Totial to the north and east, Goreeni to the south, and Phallah to the west.

== Transport ==
Lora is connected with Abbottabad via the Ghora Gali- Shah Maqsood road, the travelling time from Abbottabad is about 3 hours by bus and two hours by car. Murree is about 22 km from Lora and can be reached in 40 minutes . Islamabad is about 60 km and 90 minutes drive.
