= Haripur rocket attack =

2023 attack in Havelian, Pakistan

Abbottabad Attack
- Location: Langra Havelian, Abbottabad District, Khyber Pakhtunkhwa, Pakistan
- Date: 20 March 2023
- Target: Atif Munsif Khan Jadoon, Tehsil Nazim and PTI candidate
- Attack type: Ambush, Shooting, Mass murder
- Weapons: Rocket, firearms
- Deaths: 11
- Injuries: 2
- Perpetrator: Unknown

On Monday, 20 March 2023, an attack took place in Havelian, a town in Abbottabad District, Khyber Pakhtunkhwa, Pakistan which caused the death of at least eleven people, including Atif Munsif Khan Jadoon, a leader of the PTI party and Havelian Tehsil Mayor-(Nazim). Atif Munsif Khan Jadoon had been elected as an independent candidate in the 2022 municipal elections, and later joined the Imran Khan-led PTI.

== Background ==
Police officials reported that Atif Munsif Khan Jadoon's vehicle was ambushed by individuals from Basti Buland Khan, who are known to be arch-rivals of Basti Sher Khan. The attackers fired a rocket at the vehicle in the Langra area in Havelian district, Abbottabad. The vehicle was completely destroyed, seven people were killed including Atif Munsif Khan Jadoon, and three others were injured. Police officials clarified that Atif Munsif Khan Jadoon was killed in a firing incident, rather than a rocket-propelled grenade attack. The incident is believed to be a result of an enmity since the 1970s which has killed about 50 people from both sides.

The police registered a case against the unidentified accused. There were difficulties identifying the victims due to the extent of their injuries. The bodies were taken to the Abbottabad District Headquarters Hospital for further formalities, and the authorities assured that the bodies would be handed over to their families after identification.

== Reactions ==
PTI Senior Vice President Fawad Chaudhry and former Khyber Pakhtunkhwa chief minister Mahmood Khan condemned the attack and urged the provincial government to take immediate action to bring the perpetrators to justice.
