= Langra, Abbottabad =

Langra
- Union council
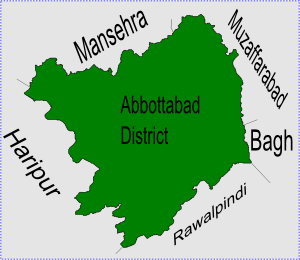
- Langra is located in Abbottabad District
- Interactive map of Langra
- Coordinates: 34°04′0″N 73°10′0″E
- Country: Pakistan
- Province: Khyber Pakhtunkhwa
- District: Abbottabad
- Tehsil: Havelian

Government
  - Nazim: Nisar Khan Jadoon

Population
  - Total: 9,876

Langra is one of the 51 union councils of Abbottabad District in the Khyber Pakhtunkhwa province of Pakistan.

== History ==
In 1848, during the Second Anglo-Sikh War, Jullal Khan who was a landowner of Langra - was described as a "friend" by James Abbott. Khan had brought news to Abbott that John Nicholson had halted the forces of Chatar Singh.

== Location ==
Langra is located at 34°4'0N 73°10'0E and has an average elevation of 871 metres (2860 feet). It is situated to the south of Abbottabad city, neighbouring Union councils are, Salhad - which lies to the North and forms the approach to Abbottabad city, Rajoya to the east, Havelian to the South and Kokal to the west (which forms the approach to Haripur District).

== Administration ==
The Union Council, which is part of Havelian Tehsil, is subdivided into the following areas: Banda Sahib Khan, Lari and Langra.

== Tribes ==
Jadoons are the main tribe with good number of Gujars, Malik Awans, Tanolis and others.
