= Dewal Manal =

Coordinates: 34.0000°N 73.0000°E

- Union council
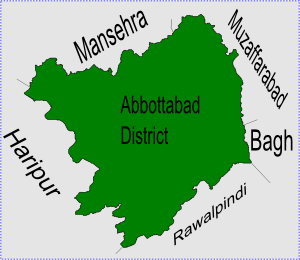
- Dewal Manal is located in Abbottabad District
- Interactive map of Dewal Manal
- Country: Pakistan
- Province: Khyber-Pakhtunkhwa
- District: Abbottabad
- Tehsil: Havelian

Government
  - Nazim: Vacant
  - Naib Nazim: Vacant

Population
  - Total: 9,951

Dewal Manal is one of the 51 union councils of Abbottabad District in the Khyber-Pakhtunkhwa province of Pakistan.

== History ==
The village of Dewal Manal is situated in the Dhun <دهن> valley, the word dewal came from an Urdu word Dewalia <ديواليه>, meaning 'bankrupt', which was attached to this locale due to many wars and other disasters. The villages here have been destroyed many times. During British rule the area was initially a major command post for the local Karlals, but the British made a fort at Nara.

Local politician Haider Zaman Khan, known as Baba Haider Zaman, was the leader of the movement for a Hazara Province - Quaid E Tehreek E Sooba Hazara. He was buried in the village after his death in 2018, Zaman had been instrumental in banding together various politicians for the Hazara movement, Dewal Manal was his native village.

== Location ==
Dewal Manal is located in the central part of Abbottabad District and borders Nara and Seer Gharbi (to the South), Nathia Gali and Nagri Bala to the east, and Garhi Phulgran to the west and north. The area is scenic, with mountains, pine trees, and lakes, such as Jandar Lake.

== Subdivisions ==
The Union Council is subdivided into the following areas: Chehr, Makol Payeen, Nagri Payeen, Haari Khetar, Khann Thoha Tarairi Nalotha, and Sajikot.

The villages of union council are Cher, Saji Kot, Dewal, Makol Payeen, Nagri Payeen and Nalotha.

Central Valley: The central village of Dewal-Manal union council is Dewal. The population here is almost 99% Karlal (Bakaryal clan). Surrounded villages are:

- Sajikott
- Cher
- Kalanda
- Nara
- Ghora
- Narwara
- Pathian
- Nagri Payeen
- Nagri Tarli
- Makool Payeen
- Poona
- Hairla Maira.
