= Batnara, Abbottabad =

Batnara
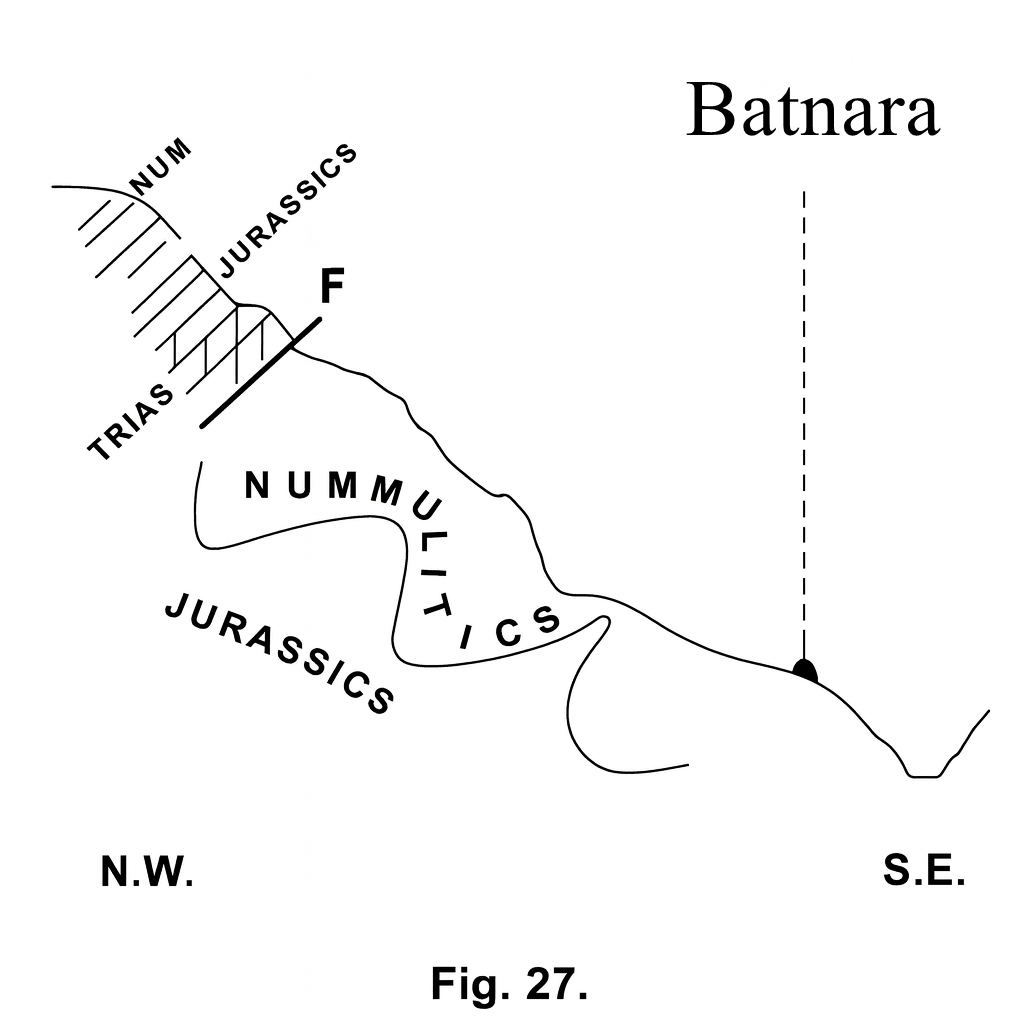
- This map is a schematic geological cross-section of the area around the village.

- Location within Pakistan
- Coordinates: 33.97056°N 73.35139°E
- Country: Pakistan
- Province: Khyber Pakhtunkhwa
- District: Abbottabad
- Tehsil: Lora
- Union Council: Seer Gharbi
- Elevation: 2,093 m (6,867 ft)
- Time zone: UTC+5 (PST)

Batnara is a village in the Khyber Pakhtunkhwa province of Pakistan. It is located at 33°58'14N 73°21'5E with an altitude of 1560 metres (5121feet). The village is part of Seer Gharbi Union Council in Abbottabad District.

== Geology ==
The area around the village was described by British geologist Charles Stewart Middlemiss when he was doing a survey of the area as part of his geological fieldwork in Hazara for the colonial era Geological Survey of India (which was prior to the emergence of Pakistan as a separate state to India). Middlemiss noted how the Jurassic rocks near Batnara are exposed briefly, then subducted beneath younger Nummulitic layers as you travel up the valley. This reflects a structural and depositional complexity, possibly due to faulting and folding, where older rocks are juxtaposed with younger ones in a tight topographic setting.

The cul-de-sac morphology and steep ascent described by Middlemiss imply that this is a geologically constrained area — ideal for observing transitions between formations but also challenging to map due to limited exposure.

Note: in his work the spellings of the areas he surveyed differ slightly from modern day ones thus Batnara is referred to as Bhatnara, Lora as Loruh and Nagri as Nugree.

== Infrastructure ==
Both locals and tourists have asked that the government build an expressway linking Batnara to the town of Jhika Gali in Punjab.*
