= Takia Sheikhan =

Pakistani village

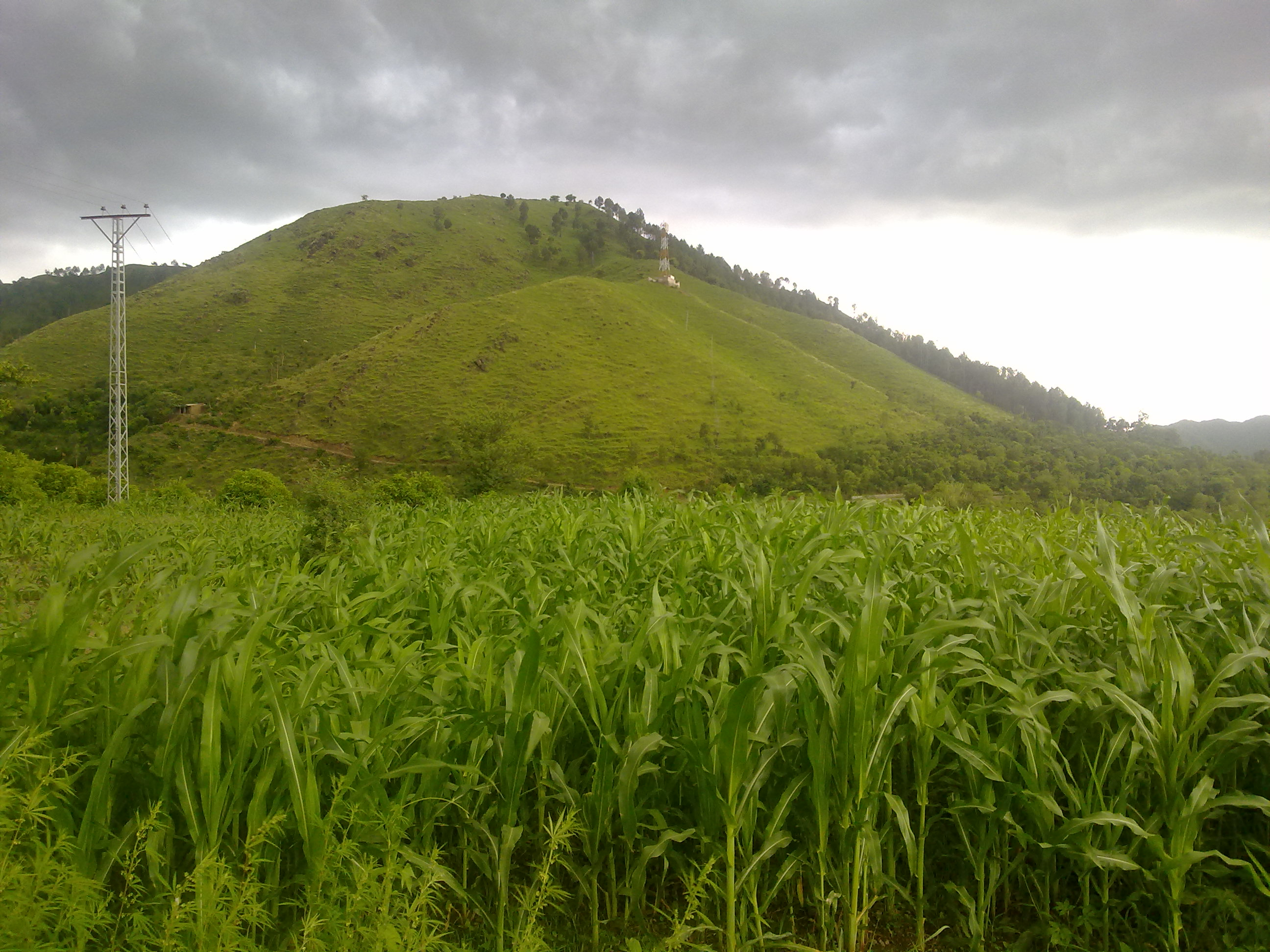
Takia Sheikhan

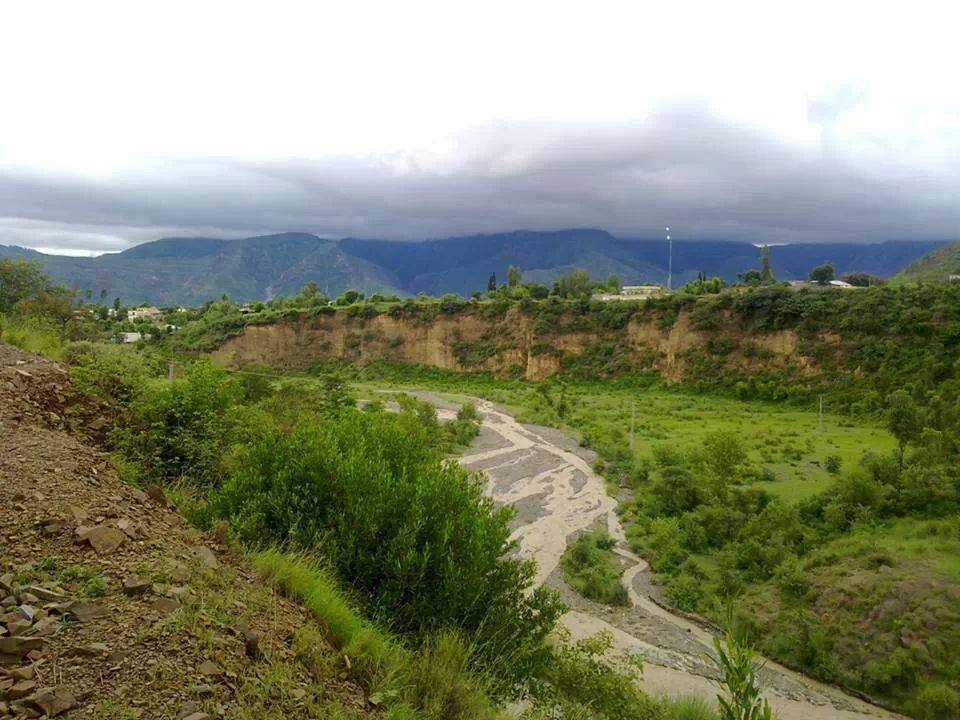
An Image of the locality

Takia Sheikhan is a village in Union Council Ghari Phulgran, Tehsil Havelian, Abbottabad District, Khyber Pakhtunkhwa, Pakistan.

Wheat and maize are major crops that are cultivated.
