= Seer Gharbi =

Pakistani administrative sub-division

- Union council
- The location of Seer Gharbi union council (highlighted in blue) within Abbottabad district, the names of the neighbouring districts to Abbottabad are also shown
- Interactive map of Seer Gharbi
- Coordinates: 33°57′N 73°21′E
- Country: Pakistan
- Province: Khyber-Pakhtunkhwa
- District: Abbottabad
- Tehsil: Lora

Government
  - Member District council: Tahir Javed Abbasi

Area
  - Total: 3,535 ha (8,740 acres)

Population
  - Total: 9,415

Seer Gharbi (Hindko, سير غربي) is one of the 51 union councils of Abbottabad District in Khyber-Pakhtunkhwa province of Pakistan. It is located in the southeastern part of the province, bordering the Rawalpindi District of Punjab province (the Murree Hills area).

Seer Gharbi also shares a border with the following Union Councils within Abbottabad District - to the north by Tajwal, to the east Nara and Nagri Totial, to the South by Seer Sharqi Bhattian and to the west by Palak.

The terrain of the whole area is hilly and mountainous, to the South lie the plains of the Punjab, travellers from the South find the land rising, the Murree region signals the start of the Himalayan mountain range. The higher altitude makes the climate of this area cooler than the land to the south, and there is usually heavy snowfall in the winter blocking roads and making travel difficult.

A notable tourist area of Seer Gharbi is the hill resort of Changla Gali which has also been the location of elections for the Pakistan Football Federation.

There are no cities in Seer Gharbi, it is mainly a mountainous rural area, the town of Seer is the largest settlement, the nearest cities to people living in Seer Gharbi are, Murree. to the South, Abbottabad (the district capital to the North West), Haripur (to the east) as well as Muzaffarabad to the North east

== Geology ==
There are a few areas of interest to geologists in Seer Gharbi, the village of Hothla gives its name to the Hothla Group which is a geologic unit in Hazara.

While the area around the village of Batnara has Jurassic rocks that are exposed briefly, then subducted beneath younger Nummulitic layers as one travels up the valley near the village.

== Wildlife ==
The area is home to a rare species of leopard which are under threat due to deforestation.

== Politics ==
Seer Gharbi is part of the NA-15, Abbottabad-I constituency and is represented by PML-N party politician Murtaza Javed Abbasi.

== Culture ==
Seer Gharbi is enriched with history and culture before partition in 1947 Seer is centre of culture and traditions. Seer has fertile land, high mountains, small rivers, and water falls. The language spoken in the area is pahari (پہاڑی) with same accent in murree.

== History ==
=== 2005 earthquake ===
On 8 October 2005 Seer Gharbi, like much of Abbottabad district, was affected by the 2005 Kashmir earthquake, however human casualties were low, the damage was largely to infrastructure - including damage to water supplies

=== 2017 blizzard ===
In December 2017 three feet of snow fell in part of Abbottabad District, Seer Gharbi was one of the Union Councils where public schools were ordered closed by the Deputy Commissioner of Abbottabad.

=== 2020 winter protest ===
In 2020 residents of Seer Gharbi (along with those from Seer Sharqi) protested in Barian Bazar demanding that their roads be cleared first as they felt their roads were being neglected in favour of tourist areas.

=== 2022 floods ===
In 2022 heavier than usual rains led incidents of flooding throughout Pakistan, in August of that year heavy rains caused damage across Khyber Pakhtunkhwa including Seer Gharbi, damaged to housing and livestock occurred.

=== 2025 floods ===
In August 2025, monsoon floods impacted much of Pakistan and during this time Seer Gharbi had road closures due to a landslide.

== Subdivisions ==
Administrative subdivisions of Seer Gharbi, the names of the neighbouring Union Councils (as well as Murree Tehsil) are also shown.

The Union Council of Seer Gharbi is subdivided into the following regions: Basbher, Malmola and Seer Gharbi.

== Census data ==
According the 2017 census - housing in the Union Council were as follow:

Housing Data by Region
Region	Housing Units	Average Household Size	Area in Hectares
Basbher	105	5.78	221
Malmola	169	6.15	715
Seer Gharbi	1587	6.95	2599

According to the 1981 district census the population of Seer Gharbi was 6,671 of which 3,123 were males and 3,548 were females. The 1998 census recorded a population of 8,895, by the time of the 2017 census the overall population of Seer Gharbi was reported as being 12,723 of which 6,397 were male and 6,326 were female, the overall literacy rate was 76.17% of which 86.57% was for males and 65.67% for females. Six years later the 2023 census reported the overall population of Seer Gharbi as being 12,232 of which 6,138 were male and 6,094 were female, the overall literacy rate was 79.3% of which 88.81% was for males and 70.3% for females.
