= Galyat =

Region in northern Pakistan

Galyat (Urdu: گلیات) region, or hill tract, (also written Galliat and Galiyat) is a narrow strip or area roughly 50 km (31 mi)–80 km (50 mi) north-east of Islamabad, Pakistan, extending on both sides of the Khyber Pakhtunkhwa–Punjab provincial border, between Abbottabad and Murree.

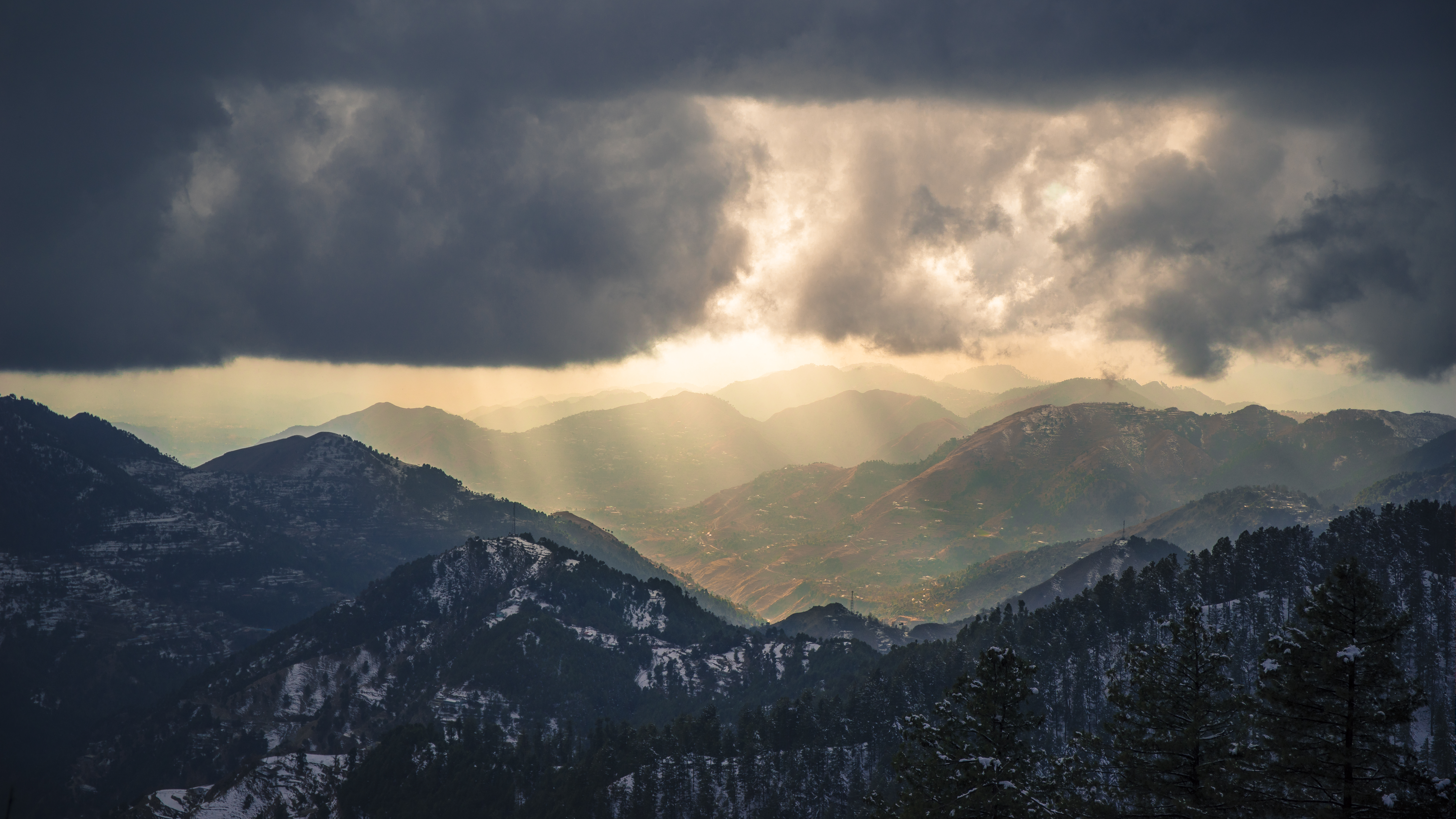
Sun through clouds in the Galyat mountains

The word itself is derived from the plural of the Urdu word gali, which means an alley between two mountains on both sides of which there are valleys and which is not the highest point in the range. Many of the towns in the area have the word gali as part of their names, and are popular tourist resorts. The area, together with the surrounding regions, is home to a linguistic continuum, which has challenged social scientists in terms of anomalous classification.

== History and ethnology ==
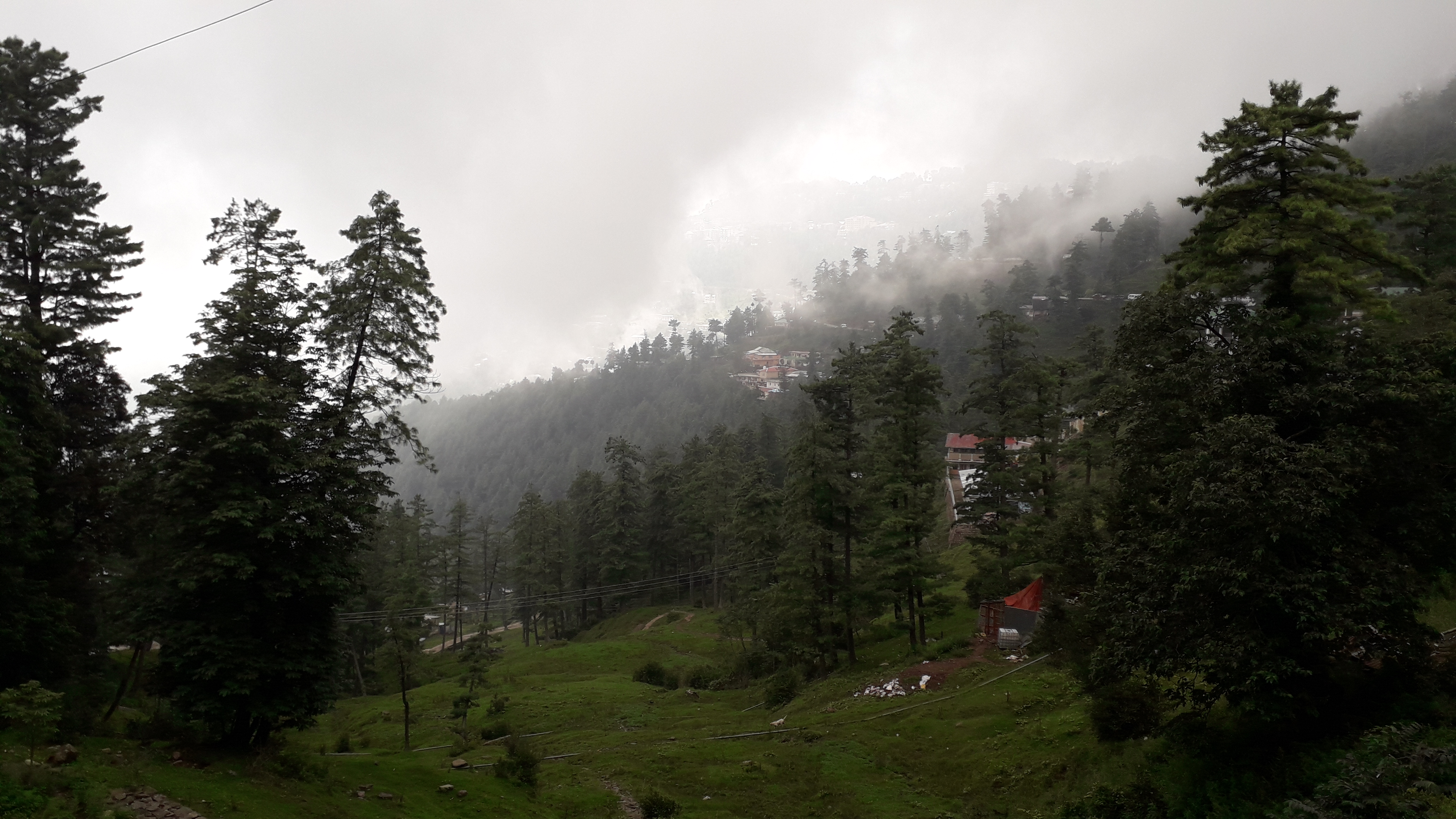
Nathia Gali in the Galyat region

The Galyat tracts were first documented by early British colonial officials, such as James Abbott, who ventured into these areas circa 1846–47. The British found them climatically conducive to them and began to develop some of the sites in the range/tract as hill resorts, to escape the summer heat of the low-lands. Later on, after the partition and independence of Pakistan in 1947, these were neglected for some time but eventually developed further from the 1960s onwards as popular resorts.

The area, being home to the Karlal tribe, was called the 'Karral country' during the colonial times by the British (named after the tribe). The Karlal's are still the dominant tribe of the Galyat. The language spoke by the tribesmen is Hindko whereas the dialect of Hindko spoken is called the 'Dhundi-Kairali'. It is today located in what is the Abbottabad District, Khyber Pakhtunkhwa. At an elevation of 2,410 m (7,905 ft), it is a popular tourist resort in the summer months. It is forested with pine, cedar, oak walnut and also oak and maple trees.

In 2023, this region has been included by UNESCO in prestigious biosphere reserve sites.

== Localities ==
=== Khyber Pakhtunkhwa ===
- Ayubia
- Bagnotar
- Bandi Mera
- Bara Gali
- Changla Gali
- Dagri Naka
- Darwaza Ayubia
- Dunga Gali
- Khaira Gali
- Khanspur
- Makool Tarli
- Namli Maira
- Nathia Gali
- Thandiani

=== Punjab ===
- Ghora Gali
- Jhika Gali
- Murree
