= Khaira Gali =

Human settlement in Pakistan

Coordinates: 33°58′N 73°24′E

Khaira Gali is one of the tourist mountain resort towns of the Galyat area of Pakistan. It has an altitude of 2347m. Khaira Gali is located in Palak which is a Union Council of Abbottabad District in Khyber Pakhtunkhwa province of Pakistan. This hill station was also used as a barricade by the British during the colonial period and during the summer months it was occupied by one of the British mountain batteries, which were stationed at Rawalpindi during the winter. It is also famous for the hexagon manor on the highest elevation of the town.
