= Hothla =

Pakistani village

- Location within Pakistan
- Coordinates: 33.97339°N 73.35874°E
- Country: Pakistan
- Province: Khyber Pakhtunkhwa
- District: Abbottabad
- Tehsil: Lora
- Union Council: Seer Gharbi
- Elevation: 1,713 m (5,620 ft)
- Time zone: UTC+5 (PST)

Hothla is a village in Seer Gharbi, located within the Abbottabad District of Khyber Pakhtunkhwa province, Pakistan. The village lies approximately 30 kilometres (19 mi) northeast of Islamabad, near the border with Punjab.

== Politics ==
It falls under the NA-15 constituency in the National Assembly of Pakistan. It was previously represented by local politician Murtaza Javed Abbasi. His father, Javed Iqbal Abbasi, had also held the same seat. The political landscape changed in the 2023 general elections, when Abbasi was defeated by Ali Asghar Khan, an independent candidate backed by Pakistan Tehreek-e-Insaf (PTI).

== Geology ==
The village lends its name to the Hothla Group which is a geologic formation in northern Pakistan that marks a major transition in depositional environments succeeding the Jurassic-aged Thandiani Group. The term was introduced following the description of the Hazara stratigraphy by Charles Stewart Middlemiss in 1896.
