= Mayor of Abbottabad =

Head of local government in Pakistan

- ناظم ایبٹ آباد
- District Government Abbottabad
- Incumbent; Sardar Shuja Nabi since 21 June 2022
- Residence: Abbottabad, Pakistan
- Website: http://dga.com.pk/

Nazim-e-Abottabad (Urdu: ناظم ایبٹ آباد) is the Mayor who heads the District Government of Abbottabad which controls the Local Government system of Abbottabad District.

== Local government system of Abbottabad ==
Abbottabad local government is headed by District Government Abottabad which itself consists of District Council consisting of 77 members who elect their respective District Nazim (mayor) and Naib Nazim (Deputy Mayor).

The powers and functions of District Council are defined in KPK Local Government Act 2013.

Following are the number of seats for Abbottabad

General	Women	Peasant	Minorities	Youth	Total
51	17	3	3	3	77

== List of mayors of Abbottabad ==
#	Mayor	Start date	End date	Deputy Mayor	Affiliation	Notes
1	Baba Haider Zaman Khan					
2	Raja Mumtaz Abbasi					
3	Col (retd) Mustafa Jadoon	2001	2005	Barrister Javed Abbasi	PMLN	
4	Haider Zaman Khan	2005	2009	Malik Juned Tanoli	PML(J)	
Administrator System was implemented 2010 - 2016
5	Sardar Sher Bahadur	30 August 2015 Ali khan Jadoon—–	incumbent	Shaukat Tanoli	IND	ex-PTI district president

6- Ali Khan Jadoon, Sardar waqar Nabi PTI 7-Sardar Saeed Anwar. Babu Javed PTI 18 August 2018-21Jan 2019

== Abbottabad local government elections 2015 ==
1. PTI (43.0%)
2. PML(N) (37.0%)
3. IND (18.0%)
4. JI (2.00%)

detailed results: KPK Local Elections 2015

Following are the results of Abbottabad Local Elections 2015

Party	UC
Pakistan Tehreek-e-Insaf	22
Pakistan Muslim League (N)	19
INDEPENDENTS	9
Jamaat-e-Islami Pakistan	1
Total	51

PTI got a marginal lead in a PMLN stronghold in the Abbottabad local elections, but couldn't bring its mayor in Abbottabad

PTI dissident Sardar Sher Bahadur who has been ex-district president for the party was refused party ticket to contest local elections, thus competed as Independent candidate. He later secured support from PMLN and PTI forward bloc and got elected as mayor of Abbottabad. He was unseated by ECP for defection but Peshawar high court has suspended ECP's decision Moreover, they have filed a case against the provincial government for demanding their budget. They have been succeeded in that case. Now that district government has been given their required budget.

== See also ==
- Mayor of Peshawar
