= Goreeni =

Coordinates: 34.0000°N 73.0000°E

- Union council
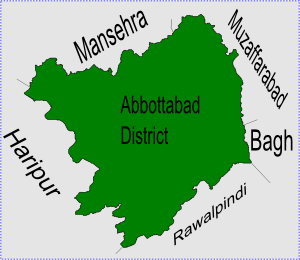
- Goreeni is located in Abbottabad District
- Interactive map of Goreeni
- Country: Pakistan
- Province: Khyber-Pakhtunkhwa
- District: Abbottabad
- Tehsil: Lora

Government
  - Nazim: Mazhar Khan Abbasi
  - Naib Nazim: Muhammad Ishtiaq Abbasi

Population
  - Total: 15,516

Goreeni is one of the 51 union councils of Abbottabad District in Khyber-Pakhtunkhwa province of Pakistan.

== Location ==
Goreeni is located in the southern part of Abbottabad district in Khyber-Pakhtunkhwa. It also meet Murree at the eastern point. It is bounded by the following union councils, Nagri Totial to the north, Lora to the south and Nara to the west. UC Goreeni is bisected by Haro river from east. People use the cable car to cross the river.

Murree is about 20 km far from Goorine and can be reached in 40 minutes. Islamabad is about 60 km far and can be reached in 80 minutes.

== Subdivisions ==
The Union Council of Goreeni is divided into the following areas: Bagla, Bajarian, Banwari, Danah, Goreeni, Chabgran, Bawar, Kotal, Palasi and Suma Garhaga.

=== Goreeni ===
Goreeni is divided into two Village Councils (VCs):

VC Goreeni - 1

VC Goreeni - 2

Chabgran (VC Goreeni - 1)

Chabgran is one of the largest village in Abbottabad District. Located above of the coast Haro River. As of today there are District Body Elections going on. Political situation in Chabgran is pretty much heated.

Candidates for the General Councilor are Haji Saqib Nawaz Abbasi, Nambardar Faisal Abbasi, Basharat Abbasi and Abdul Hameed Khan (Minnu).

== Culture and living ==
They wear simple clothes like Shalwar Kameez and Vest Coat on special occasion. They eat simple foods. Most of the people work in Islamabad due to easy access by road through the Ghora Gali- Rawalpindi road butsome of them earn by agriculture and small business. The main tribe in Goreeni are Abbasi, (Gujjars)Chaudhary and Awan.
