= Makol =

Makol (Urdu: مکول) is a village in Abbottabad District of Khyber Pakhtunkhwa province of Pakistan. The village Makol is divided into two parts: Makol Bala (Urdu: مکول بالا یا اپری مکول) and Makol Payeen (Urdu: مکول پائیں‘ بنی مکول‘ ترلی مکول). Makol Bala is the part of Union Council Nagri Bala while Makol Payeen is part of the Union Council of Dewal Manal and is located at 34°1′30″N 73°19′0″E with an altitude of 2064 metres (6774 feet).
