= Batnara =

Batnara may refer to:

- Batnara, Abbottabad
- Batnara, Muzaffarabad
