= M-15 motorway (Pakistan) =

Motorway in Pakistan, opened 2017

M-15 motorway
- ایم ١٥ موٹروے
- Hazara Motorway ہزارہ موٹروے
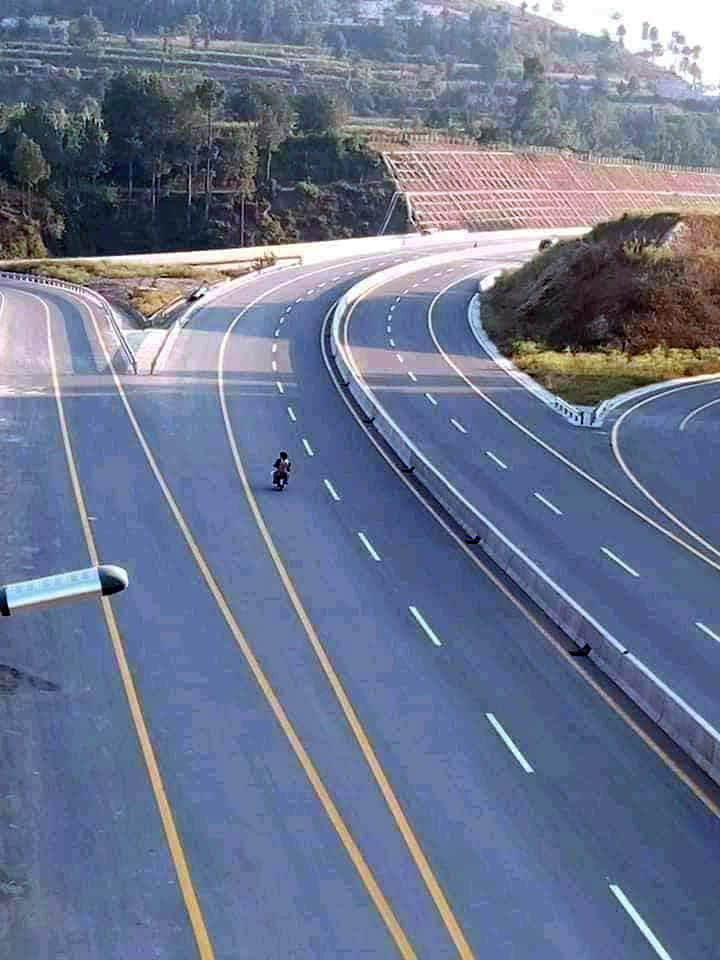
- Motorway M-15 at Mansehra

Route information
- Maintained by National Highway Authority
- Length: 180 km (110 mi)
- Existed: 2017 (initial stages)–present

Major junctions
- South end: Hassan Abdal
- Jharikass Interchange; Haripur Interchange; Shah Maqsood Interchange; Havelian Interchange; Qalandarabad Interchange; Mansehra Interchange; Bedadi Interchange; Battagram Interchange
- North end: Thakot

Location
- Country: Pakistan
- Major cities: Battagram, Mansehra, Abbottabad, Haripur

Highway system
- Roads in Pakistan
← M-14	→ M-16

The M-15 Motorway or the Hasan Abdal–Thakot Motorway, also known as the Hazara Motorway (Hindko/Urdu: ہزارہ موٹروے, Pashto: د هزاره موټروې), is a 180-kilometer controlled-access motorway in Pakistan. It links the Burhan Interchange near Hasan Abdal in the Punjab province with Haripur, Havelian, Abbottabad, Mansehra, Shinkiari, Battagram, and Thakot in the Hazara Division of the Khyber Pakhtunkhwa province.

The project is divided into seven packages – the first four (from Burhan to Mansehra) were completed and inaugurated on 27 December 2017 and 18 November 2019, and the last three sections, from Maneshra to Thakot, were inaugurated on 29 July 2020.

The Hasan Abdal and Havelian section was financed by the Asian Development Bank, along with a Rs. 10.021 billion (US$36 million) grant from the United Kingdom, while the Havelian to Shinkiari and Shinkiari to Thakot sections of the motorway were financed under the China–Pakistan Economic Corridor.

== Route ==
The motorway starts from Havelian, passes through Abbottabad, Mansehra and Shinkiari, and ends at Thakot. It has five tunnels – two at Abbottabad, and one each at Battal, Karmong and Mansehra. Up to Haripur, it is a six-lane controlled-access road, the section from Havelian to Mansehra has four lanes, while the Mansehra to Thakot section has two lanes.

The route begins at its southernmost extent – the Hazara Expressway interchange, located to the west of Hasan Abdal near the village of Koliya on the banks of the Haro River in northern Punjab province on the M-1 motorway. The route tracks northeast, and crosses the Haro River. The Jharikass Interchange is located immediately east of the river, where the motorway intersects with the N-35 National Highway at Tareen Abad bus stop.

Further eastwards is the Hattar Industrial Area and on west is the village Char. The motorway continues eastwards, where it connects to Haripur Road via the Hattar Interchange near the town of Kot Najeebullah. From there, it continues towards the east to N-125 National Highway, which it joins via the Chechiyan Interchange, six miles south of Haripur. It thus serves as a bypass and alternative route to the N-35 National Highway which courses directly through the city of Haripur.

The motorway further continues eastwards for two miles before turning northeast towards the town of Shah Maqsood, where the Shah Maqsood Interchange connects the motorway, for a second time, with the N-35 National Highway. From there, the highway runs roughly parallel to the N-35 National Highway as it travels northeast towards the city of Havelian. At the confluence of the Dor River and the Salhad Nalah, the Havelian Interchange connects the motorway with the N-35 National Highway for direct access to Havelian.

The next phase extends the motorway further north to Abbottabad via the 1.7 km Shimla tunnel and continues on to Manshera, Battagram and terminate at Thakot to rejoin the N-35.

== Inauguration ==
=== Hasan Abdal–Shah Maqsood opening ===
Former Prime Minister Nawaz Sharif inaugurated the construction of the project on 29 November 2014. The first phase of the project would cost PKR 33 billion and will include the 60-kilometre-long (37 mi), six-lane, fenced portion of the motorway from Hasan Abdal to Havelian. Packages one and two comprising a 39.61 stretch of road between Burhan and Serai Saleh were awarded to the Chinese firm Gezhouba Group. Prime Minister Shahid Khaqan Abbasi inaugurated the 47-kilometre stretch from Burhan-Shah Maqsood Interchange to Havelian on 27 December 2017. The Prime Minister unveiled the plaque at Lora Chowk interchange, located 13 kilometres from Haripur.

=== Shah Maqsood–Mansehra opening ===
The 40 kilometers long Shah Maqsood to Mansehra section was inaugurated on 18 November 2019 by Prime Minister Imran Khan. Havelian to Thakot Hazara Is divided into three sections which included 47 bridges, 6 tunnels, and 6 service areas i.e. Abbottabad Shimla Hill tunnel 1.75 Kilometer, 2nd tunnel 390 meters, Mansehra Lassan Nawab tunnel 2.75 kilometers.

=== Mansehra–Thakot opening ===
In July 2020, the extension of Hazara Motorway was completed with a length of 80 km, linking Mansehra to Thakot. The project was inaugurated on 29 July 2020, by chief minister Khyber Pakhtunkhwa, Mahmood Khan. The Mansehra-Thakot section cost Rs. 133 billion and was funded under China–Pakistan Economic Corridor.

== See also ==
- Motorways of Pakistan
- Roads in Pakistan
- China–Pakistan Economic Corridor
- National Highways of Pakistan
- Transport in Pakistan
- National Highway Authority
