= Khota Qabar =

Village in Pakistan

Khota Qabr (literally 'The Donkey's Grave'), now also called Muslimabad is the name of a small village near the Haro River, in the hills above Havelian town, en route to Abbottabad city, Pakistan.

The village lies slightly to one side, across the Khota Qabar/Muslimabad Kattha (small stream feeding the Haro River). It is around 60 miles North of Islamabad and around 7 miles from Abbottabad.
