= Seer Sharqi Bhattian =

Coordinates: 34°12′30″N 73°29′0″E

Seer Sharqi Mera Rehmal Bhattian Abbottabad
- Union council
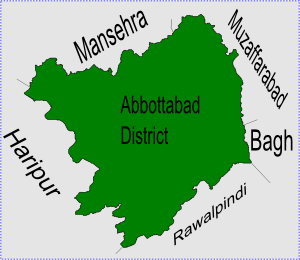
- Seer Sharqi Bhattian is located in Abbottabad District
- Interactive map of Seer Sharqi Mera Rehmal Bhattian Abbottabad
- Country: Pakistan
- Province: Khyber-Pakhtunkhwa
- District: Abbottabad
- Tehsil: Abbottabad

Government
  - District Councilor: Raees Abbasi
  - Tehsil Councilor: Shohaib abbasi

Seer Sharqi is one of the 51 union councils of Abbottabad District in Khyber-Pakhtunkhwa province of Pakistan. It is located in the south of the district – to the south and east it borders Murree, it also borders the following union councils within Abbottabad District, to the north Seer Gharbi, and to the west is Nagri Totial.

== Subdivisions ==
The Union Council is subdivided into the following areas: Nareela, Maira Rehmal, Lower Bhattian, Pandan, Tian, Leeran, Bhattian, Seer Sharqi and Taror. Former Tehsil Nazam Mehmood Hayat Abbasi also belongs to this Uc. He is the person who gave this Uc to people during his era. Before, it was a part of Uc Nagri tutial.

== Demography ==
According to the 2017 census the total number of households was 1,787 with an average of 6.35 people per household.

2017 Census Figures – Household Data By Village
Village Name	Number Of Households	Number Of People Per Household
Bhatian	429	6.01
Seer Sharqi	882	6.19
Taror	476	6.95
