= Rahi, Abbottabad =

Pakistani village

Coordinates: 34°12′30″N 73°29′0″E

Rahi is a village in the Union Council of Phallah, Abbottabad District, Khyber Pakhtunkhwa, Pakistan. It is located in the southwest of the district.

Until the local government reforms of 2000 Rahi was a separate Union Council to Phalla,

== Location ==
Rahi is in the northern part of the Union Councils - its western border is with Abbottabad District.
