= Rajab Ali Khan Abbasi =

Member of the provincial assembly of KPK

Sardar Rajab Ali Khan Abbasi

Member of the Provincial Assembly of Khyber Pakhtunkhwa
- Incumbent
- Assumed office 29 February 2024
- Constituency: PK-43 Abbottabad-II

Personal details
- Born: Abbottabad District, Khyber Pakhtunkhwa, Pakistan
- Party: PTI (2024-present)

Sardar Rajab Ali Khan Abbasi is a Pakistani politician from Abbottabad District. He is currently serving as member of the Provincial Assembly of Khyber Pakhtunkhwa since February 2024.

== Biography ==
Mr. Rajab Ali Khan Abbasi was born on April 23, 1974 in Nagri Tutial village, Abbottabad Tehsil. He is a businessman by profession. He belongs to a Dhund Abbasi family. His ancestors played pivotal role in freedom movement of Pakistan. His Younger brother Sardar Sajid Ali Khan Abbasi served as member district council Abbottabad. He defeated ex-senator Javed Abbasi in 2024 General Election. He and his family members always supported Imran Khan and P.T.I. Abbasi put particular focus in the field of education, health and infrastructure after becoming M.P.A. He is known as "Dervish" or "Awami" (of the people) M.P.A. His style of politics is very Popular among all segments in Abbottabad and his constituency.

== Career ==
He contested the 2024 general elections as a Pakistan Tehreek-e-Insaf/Independent candidate from PK-43 Abbottabad-II. He secured 41,242 votes. Sardar Rajab Abbasi contested Chairman Tehsil Election in 2018 of Lora Tehsil.

== Politics ==
In April 2025 Abbasi noted that thousands of tourists visit the Galiyat every year and that his helps to boost income and employment - however he also noted that the people of region face a water shortage as water from the Galiyat area is transported to Murree - this then forces people to buy water. Abbasi also attended a meeting of the Khyber Pakhtunkhwa Assembly’s Standing Committee on Culture, Tourism, Archaeology and Museums at the Assembly Secretariat in Peshawar. The committee reviewed coordination gaps between the Departments of Forests, Local Government, and Environment, which are affecting tourism development.

To address these issues, the committee instructed relevant departments to submit a 15-day action plan to clarify roles, eliminate overlaps, and improve inter-agency coordination. It also stressed the need for better infrastructure, tourist safety, sustainable practices, transparent fund usage, and a system for handling tourist feedback.
