= Ghari Phulgran =

Coordinates: 34.0000°N 73.0000°E

Garhi Phulgran
- Union council
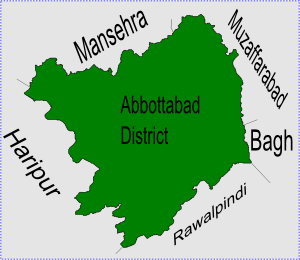
- Garhi Phulgran is located in Abbottabad District
- Interactive map of Garhi Phulgran
- Country: Pakistan
- Province: Khyber-Pakhtunkhwa
- District: Abbottabad
- Tehsil: Havelian

Government
  - Nazim: Aurangzaib Khan Jadoon
  - Naib Nazim: Faridoon Khan jadoon

Population (Hazarywalls and pathans (khan and jadoon))
  - Total: 20,433
- Website: Www.takiasheikhan.blogspot.com

Garhi Phulgran is one of the 51 union councils (administrative subdivisions) of Abbottabad District in Khyber-Pakhtunkhwa province of Pakistan.

== Subdivisions ==
The Union Council is divided into the following areas: Garhi Phulgran, Takia Sheikhan, Banda Sheikhan, Ghora Bazgram, Harnara, Kiala, Mannan, Rajoya and Thith Ochar. Until the local government reforms of 2000, Rajoya was a separate union council.

== Major villages ==
- Rajoya
- Kiala
- Banda Sheikhan
- Ghari Phulgran (state of khan)
- Takia Sheikhan
- Ghora Baz Garan
- Malkan
- Batala
- Hurnara
- Sajawal
- Upper Sajawal
