= Nagri Tarli =

Nagri Tarli is a village in Abbottabad District of Khyber Pakhtunkhwa province of Pakistan. It is part of the Union Council of Dewal Manal and is located at 34°1′20″N 73°18′0″E with an altitude of 1712 metres (5620 feet). Famous Points: Barrian ( Kashif Karlal's House Barian), Bagh, Balyasar, Garlani, Jalsiyan, Hellan, Mohari, Charrat, Katha, Nalla, Kanat, Graan, kathi, Taroli, Upri Pandi.
