= Hazara Province Movement =

Movement for a separate province in Pakistan

Hazara Province Movement (Urdu and Hindko: تحریک صوبہ ہزارہ) is a movement aimed at gaining a separate provincial status for the Hazara Division in Khyber Pakhtunkhwa province of Pakistan.

== Background ==
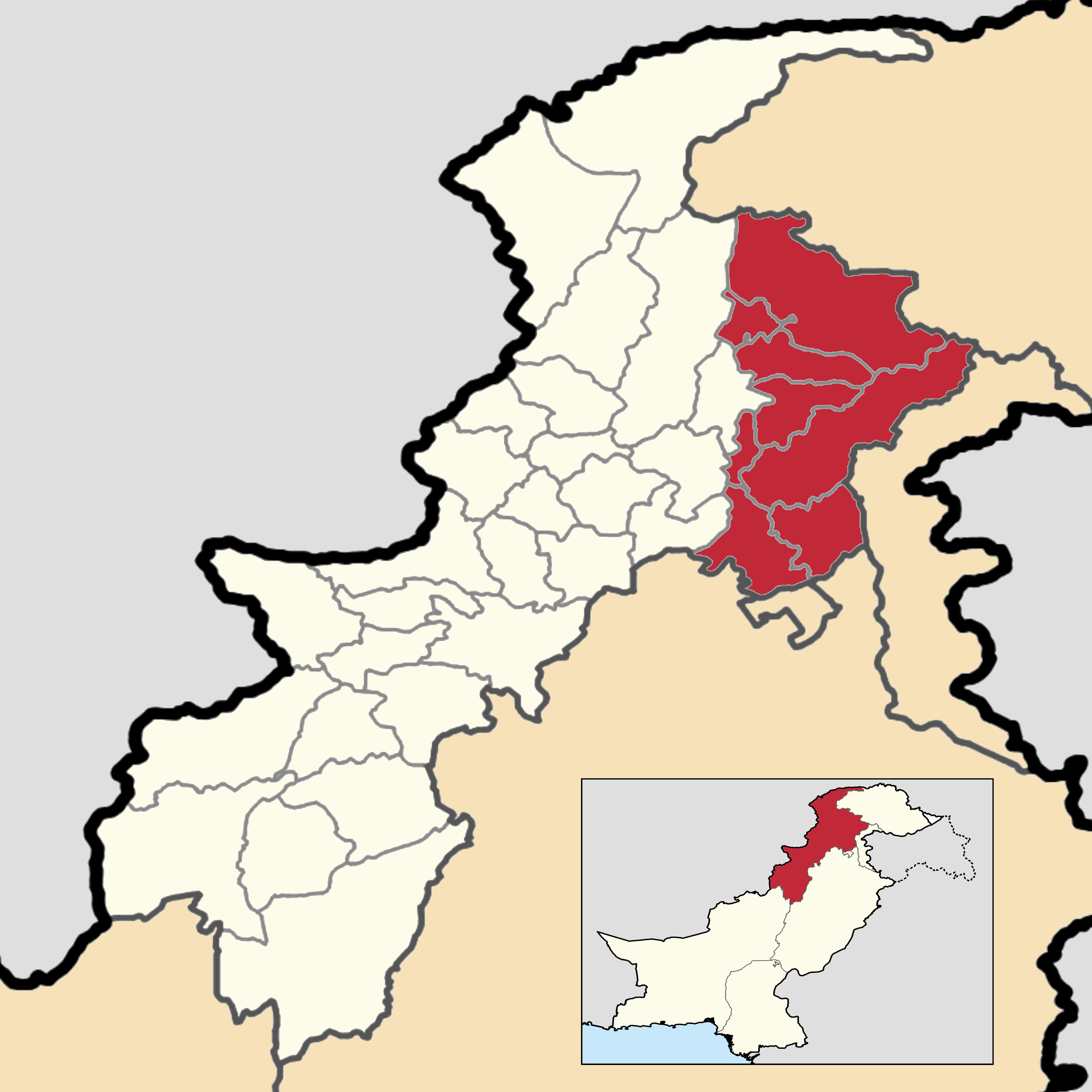
Map of the constituent parts of the Hazara Division of Pakistan

Hazara Division is linguistically and ethnically diverse which distinguish it from the rest of the Pashtun-majority province. According to the 2023 Census of Pakistan, the three largest ethnolinguistic groups in Hazara are Hindkowans (56%), Pashtuns (20.7%) and Kohistanis (14.6%).

The movement for Hazara province began in 1957, when regional lawyers Mufti Idrees and Abdul Khaliq first raised the question of a separate province, Kohistan. In 1987, Hazara Qaumi Mahaz (HQM) was founded by Muhammad Asif Malik a prominent advocate who campaigned for the creation of a separate province. The movement has a strong support among the residents of Hazara region, also known as Hazarewals.

== 2010 protests ==
The Eighteenth Amendment to the Constitution of Pakistan was passed on 8 April 2010, which among other changes, renamed the North-West Frontier Province to Khyber Pakhtunkhwa. The name change of the province was met with strong opposition from the people of Hazara and protests erupted in the region with wheel and shutter jam strikes. Abbottabad became the nerve center of the movement. On 12 April, the Khyber Pakhtunkhwa Police fired at unarmed protesters, leaving 7 dead and dozens injured. Allegedly, the firing was ordered by the coalition government of Khyber Pakhtunkhwa, led by the Awami National Party. This is one of the most violent incidents of police brutality in Pakistan, occurring before the Model Town Lahore incident, whose FIR has not been registered still today.

== Later developments ==
In 2014, the resolution for the creation of the Hazara Province was adopted by the Khyber Pakhtunkhwa Assembly. The movement later slowed down and shrunk to only observing the 12th of April martyrs' anniversary and the death of the movement's pioneer Baba Haider Zaman in 2018.

In 2020, the movement sparked again when the government began groundwork for the creation of the Saraiki and Bahawalpur provinces. Hazarewal leaders sought to include the creation of the Hazara Province along with it. A bill for the creation of the Hazara province was also tabled in the Parliament of Pakistan. Another resolution was passed by the KP assembly in 2022, calling for the implementation of the 2014 resolution.

The Hazara Province Movement saw revival in 2024 after the Awami National Party leader Aimal Wali Khan suggested the province to be renamed as Pakhtunkhwa, drawing criticism from the Hazara Division-based political parties who vowed for a separate provincial status. In December 2025, the Khyber Pakhtunkhwa Assembly unanimously passed another resolution calling for the creation of Hazara province and urged the federal government to initiate the constitutional process for its establishment.

== Notable leaders ==
- Baba Haider Zaman
- Gohar Ayub Khan
- Engr sardar Mehmood Khaliq karlal ANP Dupty gernal sectory Abbottabad

== See also ==
- Eighteenth Amendment to the Constitution of Pakistan
- Karachi Province movement
