= Rahi =

Rai may refer to:

== Given name ==
- Rahi (goddess), a regional form of Hindu goddess Radha
- Rahi Chakraborty, a singer and songwriter from India
- Rahi Masoom Raza, an Indian writer
- Rahi Mo'ayyeri, an Iranian poet and musician
- Rahi Rezvani, an Iranian photographer and director

== Surname ==
- Chander Singh Rahi, an Indian folk singer from Uttarakhand
- Bechara Boutros al-Rahi, Maronite Patriarch of Antioch from 2011
- Sultan Rahi, a Pakistani film actor
- Yamila Diaz-Rahi, an Argentine supermodel

== Other uses ==
- The RAHI Foundation (Recovering and Healing from Incest), an Indian support organization
- Rahi (film), a 1952 Hindi film by Khwaja Ahmad Abbas, based on a Mulk Raj Anand story
- Rahi Badal Gaye, a 1985 Hindi film produced by Ravi Malhotra.
- Hum Hain Rahi Pyar Ke, a 1993 Bollywood movie
- Rahi (Lego), the animals and wildlife of Lego's fictional Bionicle franchise
- Rahi, Abbottabad, a village in Abbottabad district, Pakistan
- Rahi, Raebareli, a village in Uttar Pradesh, India

== See also ==
- Rakhi (disambiguation)
