= Reconstruction of the Karakoram Highway =

Overview of the reconstruction of the Chinese–Pakistani Karakoram Highway

National Highway 35
- قومی شاہراہ ٣٥
- Karakoram Highway Reconstruction
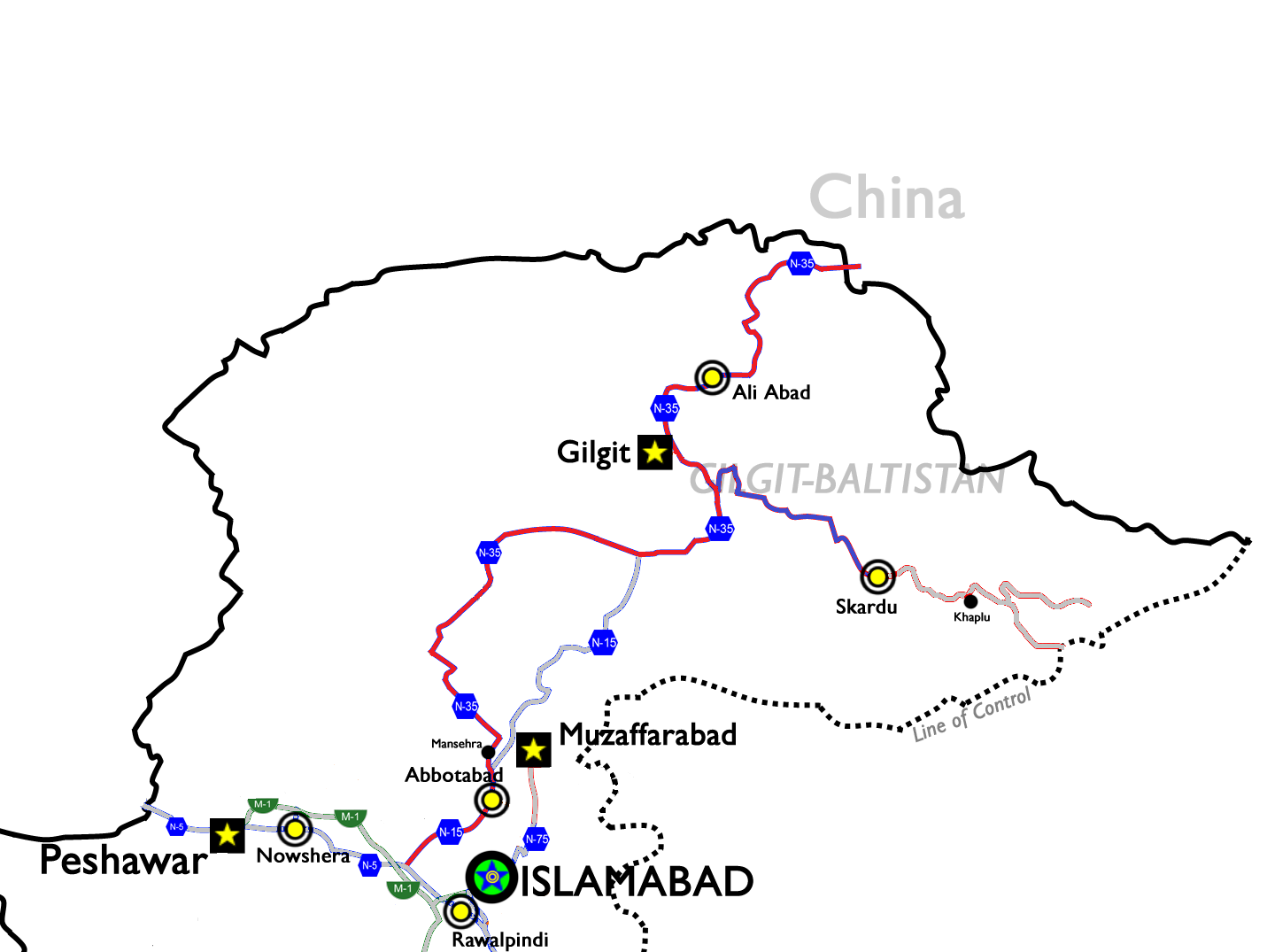
- Highlighted in red is the route of National Highway 35, which is to be completely rebuilt and upgraded under the CPEC agreement. Highlighted in blue is the 175 km (109 mi) road between Gilgit and Skardu which is to be upgraded to a four-lane highway.

Route information
- Length: 806 km (501 mi)

Major junctions
- North end: China–Pakistan border
- South end: Hasan Abdal, Punjab

Location
- Country: Pakistan

Highway system
- Roads in Pakistan

As part of the China–Pakistan Economic Corridor, reconstruction and upgrade works are underway on the 887-kilometre-long (551 mi) National Highway 35 (N-35), which forms the Pakistani portion of the Karakoram Highway (KKH).

== Route description ==
The KKH spans the 806-kilometre-long (501 mi) distance between the China–Pakistan border and the town of Hasan Abdal. At Burhan Interchange near Hasan Abdal, the existing M1 motorway will intersect the N-35 at the Shah Maqsood Interchange. From there, access onwards to Islamabad and Lahore continues as part of the existing M1 and M2 motorways. Hasan Abdal will also be at intersection of the Eastern Alignment, and Western Alignment.

The planned upgrades to the 470-kilometre-long (290 mi) section between Hasan Abdal and Raikot of the Karakoram Highway over the next many years is officially referred to in Pakistan as the Karakoram Highway Phase 2 project.

=== Hasan Abdal and Havelian ===
This is currently a 54 kilometres (34 mi) of 2 lane roadway referred to as the N-35. Work is completed to construct a new 59-kilometre-long (37 mi), six-lane controlled-access highway between Hasan Abdal and Haripur officially referred as the Hazara Motorway or M-15. This section of reconstruction is not part of CPEC and has been co-financed by Asian Development Bank and UK.

=== Havelian to Shinkiari ===
North of Havelian, the next 61 kilometres (38 mi) of the 2 lane roadway has been upgraded to a four-lane dual carriageway between Havelian and Shinkiari as part of CPEC. This upgraded section is also refereed as the second part of Hazara Motorway & was completed in November 2019. Groundbreaking on this portion commenced in April 2016.

=== Shinkiari to Thakot ===
The Shinkiari to Thakot 76 kilometres (47 mi) is a 2 lane roadway. This will be upgraded to a 2 lane highway as part of CPEC and construction commenced in April 2016 jointly with construction of the Havelian to Shinkiari four-lane dual carriageway. Construction on both these sections is expected to be completed within 42 months at a cost of approximately $1.26 billion with 90% of funding to come from China's EXIM bank in the form of low interest rate concessional loans. The section is also refereed as the third part of Hazara Motorway.&It is completed and opened for traffic, this part includes 3 big tunnels.

=== Thakot to Raikot ===
The 279 kilometres (173 mi) of 2 lane roadway between Thakot and Raikot spans an area in which the government of Pakistan is currently either planning or actively constructing several hydropower projects, most notably the Diamer-Bhasha Dam and Dasu Dam. Sections of the N-35 around these projects will be completely rebuilt in tandem with dam construction In the interim, this section of the N-35 is currently being improved from its current state until dam construction commences in full force at a later date. Improvement projects on this section are expected to be completed by January 2017 at a cost of approximately $72 million.

China suspended funding for improvement of this portion of Karakorum Highway (KKH) in December 2017, apparently due to allegations of corruption in the project.

=== Raikot to the Khunjerab Pass at Chinese border ===
The next 336 kilometres (209 mi) of 2 lane roadway connect Raikot to Khunjerab Pass. Reconstruction works on this section of roadway preceded the CPEC, and were initiated after severe damage to roadways in the area following the 2010 Pakistan floods. Most of this section of roadway was completed in September 2012 at a cost of $510 million, and was severely dilapidated even prior to the 2010 flooding. No additional upgrade is proposed for this section in the current reconstruction phase.

=== Khunjerab Pass ===
The Khunjerab Pass is the highest paved international border crossing in the world and the highest point on the Karakoram Highway. The long, relatively flat pass is snow-covered during the winter season and as a consequence is generally closed for heavy vehicles from 30 November to 1 May and for all vehicles from 30 December to 1 April. No additional upgrade is proposed for the Khunjerab pass section of KKH in the current reconstruction phase.

=== Landslide shelters on KKH ===
Many sites on the Karakoram Highway are prone to landslides specially during the monsoon and winter months. Landslide shelters have been constructed at many points to protect the highway but still the highway often gets closed for traffic for 2–3 days due to landslides triggered by rainfall or snowfall

=== China-Pakistan Friendship Tunnels ===
In addition to flooding, a large earthquake rocked the region nearest to the China-Pakistan border in 2010, triggering massive landslides which dammed the Hunza River, and resulted in the formation of the Attabad Lake. Portions of the N-35 were submerged in the lake, forcing all vehicular traffic onto barges to traverse the new reservoir. Construction on a 24-kilometre (15 mi) series of bridges and tunnels to Attabad Lake began in 2012 and required 36 months for completion. The bypass consists of two large bridges, 78 culverts and five kilometres (3.1 mi) worth of tunnels that were inaugurated for public use on 14 September 2015 at a cost of $275 million.

=== Gilgit to Skardu ===
The 175-kilometre (109 mi) road between Gilgit and Skardu will be upgraded to a four-lane road at a cost of $475 million to provide direct access to Skardu from the N-35.

== Cost and Financing ==
As part of CPEC, approximately $11 billion worth of infrastructure projects being developed by the Pakistani government will be financed by concessionary loans, with composite interest rates of 1.6%, after Pakistan successfully lobbied the Chinese government to reduce interest rates from an initial 3%. The concessional loans are subsidised by the government of China, and are to be dispersed by the Exim Bank of China and the China Development Bank. For comparison, loans for previous Pakistani infrastructure projects financed by the World Bank carried an interest rate between 5% and 8.5%, while interest rates on market loans approach 12%.

The China Development Bank will finance the $920 million towards the cost of reconstruction of the 487-kilometre (303 mi) portion of the Karakoram Highway between Hasan Abdal and Raikot.

An addition $1.26 billion will be lent by the China Exim Bank for the construction of the Havelian to Thakot portion of this stretch of roadway, to be dispersed as low-interest rate concessional loans.

Construction works on the China-Pakistan Friendship Tunnels can be traced to 2013, when China began construction on a 24-kilometre (15 mi) bypass of Attabad Lake with a combination of 5 km worth of tunnels, two large bridges, and 78 small bridges to bypass the lake which had been formed after a 2010 earthquake triggered massive landslides. The resulting landslides cut off both the Hunza River and Karakoram Highway resulting in the formation of the reservoir. Prior to completion of the bypass, all vehicular traffic had to be loaded onto barges to traverse the new reservoir. Construction of the tunnels began in 2012 and required 36 months for completion. The 24 km long series of bridges and tunnels was inaugurated on 15 September 2015 at a cost of $275 million and was hailed as a major accomplishment.
