= Satora =

Satora, Khyber pakhtunkhwa, Pakistan Satora
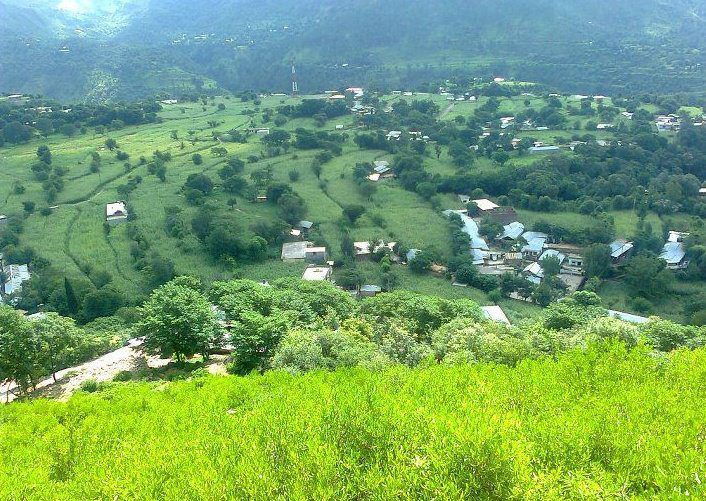
- Satora Valley.

- Location within Pakistan
- Coordinates: 33°57′29″N 73°14′59″E
- Country: Pakistan
- Province: Khyber Pakhtunkhwa
- District: Abbottabad
- Union council: Nara

Satora Valley is a village situated on the bank of Haro River, in the District of Abbottabad, Khyber Pakhtunkhwa, Pakistan.

== Geography ==
There are tall pine trees surrounding the village and the lesser Himalayas are to be seen in the distance. Satora lies in a plain valley.
