= Havelian Cantonment =

Cantonment in Khyber Pakhtunkhwa, Pakistan

Havelian Cantonment is a cantonment adjacent to Havelian in Abbottabad District, Khyber Pakhtunkhwa, Pakistan.
