= Lora Tehsil =

Pakistani administrative area

Abbottabad Tehsil تحصیل لورا
- Tehsil
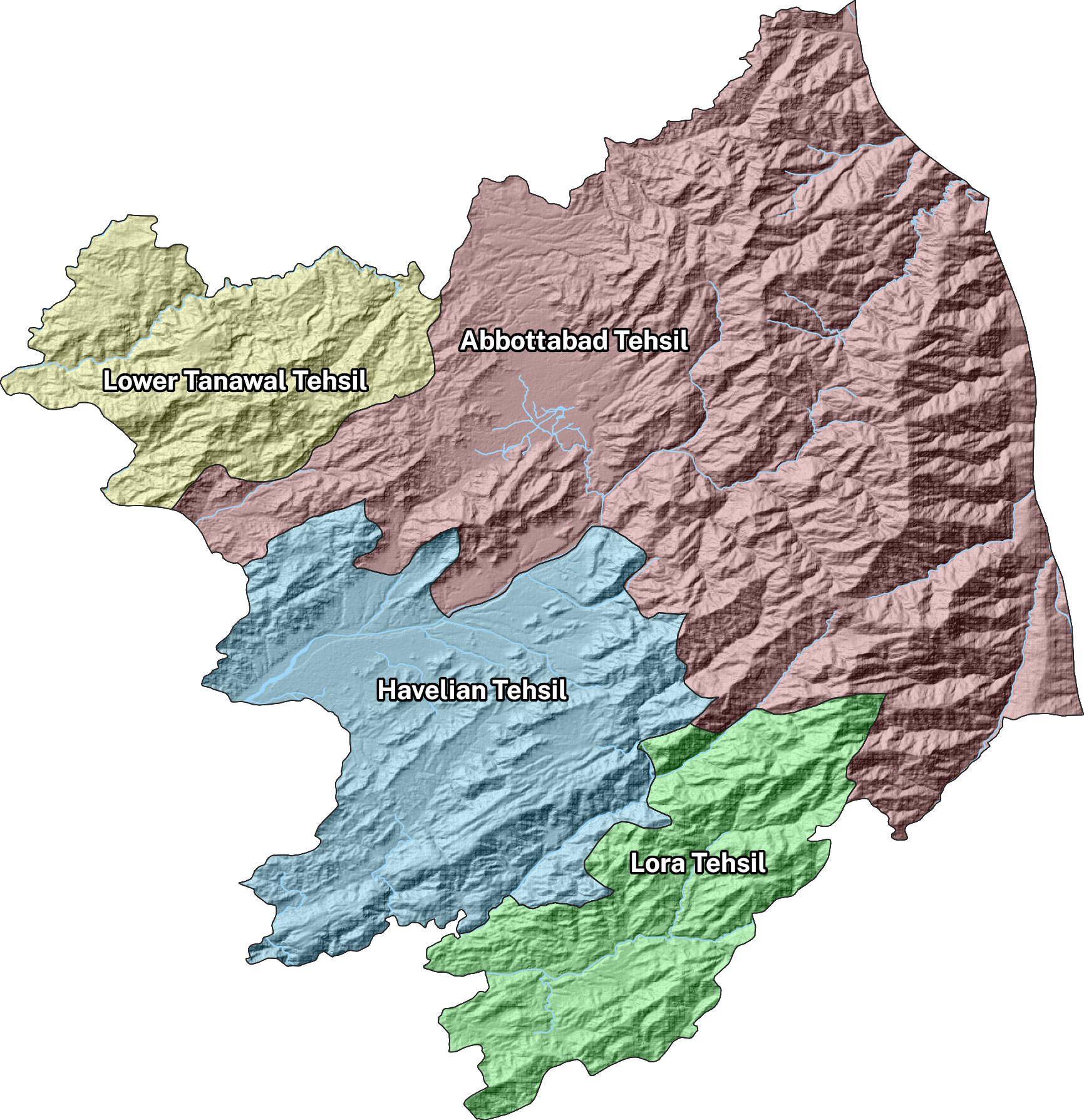
- Country: Pakistan
- Province: Khyber Pakhtunkhwa
- District: Abbottabad
- Headquarters: Lora

Area
  - Total: 187 km^{2} (72 sq mi)

Population (2023)
  - Total: 98,717
- Time zone: UTC+5 (PST)

Lora Tehsil (Urdu: تحصیل لورا) is an administrative subdivision (tehsil) of Abbottabad District in the Khyber Pakhtunkhwa province of Pakistan. It is located in the southern part of the district and borders Punjab province, it covers an area of 187 km^{2} (72 sq mi).

== History ==
During the British rule, the current district of Abbottabad was created as a Tehsil of Hazara District. After Pakistan′s independence from Britain on 14 August 1947, it remained a tehsil of Hazara until 1981 when the old Abbottabad Tehsil became a district, containing two tehsils - Abbottabad and Havelian. In recent years Lora itself has been created as a tehsil in its own right.

Tehsil Lora has always been an important place and also a business hub of Circle Lora which consists of six union councils (Lora, Goreeni, Phallah, Nagri Tutial, Seer Sharqi and Seer Gharbi). It lies at the peripheral boundary of Abbottabad and most of the people works in Islamabad due to easy access by road through the Ghora Gali- Rawalpindi road and now Rakhala road is more important. The tribes of Lora are Abbasi, Gujjar, Junjua, Awan, Qureshies and others.

== Administration ==
The tehsil was created from Havelian Tehsil and consists of 6 union councils these are Phallah, Lora, Seer Sharqi, Seer Gharbi, Goreeni and Nagri Totial. It is currently part of the NA-16 Abbottabad-I constituency.

== Politics ==
In April 2022 Iftikhar Abbasi of the PML-N was elected Chairman of Lora Tehsil defeating Rajab Ali Khan Abbasi of the PTI the latter is currently MPA Of PK-43 Abbottabad-II. In July 2024 local politician Murtaza Javed Abbasi discussed the recurrent electricity outages in Lora Tehsil that not only was making life difficult for local residents but was also impacting traders and their business operations.

== Geography ==
Tehsil Lora is bisected by the Haro River (on which the Khanpur Dam is built). Locals grow seasonal crops such as Maize (makai) and Wheat (gandum).

== Demography ==
According to the 2023 census the total population of Lora Tehsil was 98,717 of which 48,662 were male and 50,054 were female. The census also recorded religious affiliation as follows: 98326 Muslim, 268 Christians, 10 Hindus, 2 Ahmadi Muslims, 1 Sikh, 1 Parsi and 60 listed as others.

Religious affiliation of residents
Religion	Followers	Percentage
Muslim	98,326	99.65%
Christian	268	0.27%
Hindu	10	0.01%
Ahmadis	2	<0.01%
Sikh	1	<0.01%
Parsi	1	<0.01%
Others	60	0.06%

The mother tongue of residents were recorded as follows: 4,982 Urdu, 228 Punjabi, 5 Sindhi, 739 Pushto, 6 Balochi, 33 Kashmiri, 58 Saraiki, 83,676 Hindko, 36 Brahvi, 129 Shina, 15 Kalasha, 16 Kohistani and 17 listed as others. The overall literacy rate was 73.73% for the population aged 10 and above with male literacy being 84.09% and female 61.75%.

Mother-tongue of Lora Tehsil residents (2023 census)
Language	Number of speakers	Percentage
Hindko	83,676	93.01%
Urdu	4,982	5.54%
Punjabi	228	0.25%
Pushto	739	0.82%
Shina	129	0.14%
Saraiki	58	0.06%
Brahvi	36	0.04%
Kashmiri	33	0.04%
Others	17	0.02%
Sindhi	5	0.01%
Balochi	6	0.01%
Kalasha	15	0.02%
Kohistani	16	0.02%

== Health ==
In October 2025 as deaths from dengue fever continued to rise the District Health Office order anti-dengue spray to be used throughout Lora Tehsil. Infections are caused by mosquito bites and symptoms tend to appear within a week of being bitten.
