= 2015 Khyber Pakhtunkhwa local elections =

Local elections in Pakistan in 2015

- May 30, 2015

41,762 20,882 seats needed for a majority

Local elections were held in Khyber Pakhtunkhwa, Pakistan on 30 May 2015. A total of 84,420 candidates contested 41,762 seats on district, town, neighbourhood and village councils. They were the first local elections in the province for ten years.

== Background ==
The last local elections in the province took place in February 2005. The local councils that were then elected were dissolved on 20 February 2010 after their term of office ended and they were replaced by administrators until the 2015 elections.

The local elections in Khyber Pakhtunkhwa were to elect members of district councils, tehsil councils and village councils. To elect the 41,762 councillors, 11,261 polling stations were set up for the 13.1 million people who were eligible to vote. Each voter could cast seven votes, which meant 72.2 million ballot papers were printed. However, there were no elections in Kohistan after its division into two districts was challenged at Peshawar High Court.

== Seats distribution ==
Category	District council	Tehsil council	Village council	Total
General	978	978	23111	25067
Women	329	335	6678	7342
Peasants/worker	59	85	3339	3483
Youth	59	85	3339	3483
Minority	59	85	3339	3483
Total	1484	1568	39806	42858

Expected district council seats versus actual results

Based on actual votes cast at the 2013 general election

		PTI		ANP		JUIF		PMLn		PPP		JI		QWP		Others		Total		Status
District	Available	Expected	Actual	Exp	Act	Exp	Act	Exp	Act	Exp	Act	Exp	Act	Exp	Act	Exp	Act	Exp	Act	
Abbottabad	51	19	22	0	0	1	0	19	19	0	0	2	1	0	0	10	9	51	51	Complete
Bannu	49	7	6	0	2	22	17	1	0	1	0	4	0	0	0	14	5	49	30	
Battagram	20	1	10	0	0	5	6	3	0	0	0	0	0	0	0	11	2	20	18	
Buner	29	5	7	5	8	5	1	3	3	0	0	7	6	0	0	4	2	29	27	
Charsadda	49	11	11	9	16	14	7	1	0	2	0	5	3	6	9	1	3	49	49	Complete
Chitral	24	5	5	1	0	0	6	0	2	4	3	0	6	1	0	13	2	24	24	Complete
D I Khan	49	5	16	0	1	21	8	2	0	16	2	0	1	0	0	5	9	49	37	
Hangu	19	7	2	1	2	6	6	2	0	2	0	1	0	0	0	0	4	19	14	
Haripur	45	18	22	1	1	3	0	18	3	3	1	1	0	0	0	1	4	45	31	
Karak	21	7	3	1	1	2	6	4	0	0	0	1	0	0	0	6	5	21	15	
Kohat	32	12	2	1	0	6	0	3	1	2	0	1	2	0	0	7	0	32	5	
Lakki Marwat	33	4	1	1	0	17	6	11	0	0	3	0	0	0	0	0	0	33	10	
Dir Lower	41	13	4	2	5	0	0	2	0	2	3	13	23	2	0	7	3	41	38	
Malakand	28	10	8	2	0	4	2	4	0	4	8	3	1	0	0	1	5	28	24	
Mansehra	59	15	17	0	0	11	2	30	20	0	0	1	0	0	0	2	20	59	59	Complete
Mardan	75	19	21	12	22	12	5	9	0	7	3	6	2	1	0	9	12	75	65	
Nowshehra	47	20	14	7	5	2	2	8	0	3	0	3	2	0	0	4	3	47	26	
Peshawar	92	45	45	9	6	10	4	8	1	8	5	7	7	1	0	4	3	92	71	
Shangla	30	0	2	10	5	4	1	14	13	0	2	0	0	0	0	2	7	30	30	Complete
Swabi	56	12	6	10	21	10	7	5	2	2	0	1	2	0	0	16	18	56	56	Complete
Swat	67	29	24	6	8	4	2	12	21	5	1	5	1	1	0	5	10	67	67	Complete
Tank	16	4	6	0	0	7	5	0	0	4	1	0	0	0	0	4	4	16	16	Complete
Torghar	15	1	3	5	5	7	3	1	0	1	0	0	0	0	0	0	0	15	11	
Dir Upper	31	3	2	1	0	5	0	0	0	5	6	8	21	0	0	9	0	31	29	
	978	272	259	84	108	178	96	160	85	71	38	69	78	12	9	132	130			

== Election incidents ==
Women were prevented from voting in Shangla District after a local Jirga ruling, as well as in Lower Dir District, Buner District and parts of Swabi District. A number of people were injured during voting, while in Kohat a presiding officer at a polling station was suspended after allowing people to cast multiple votes.

Violent incidents after the election resulted in the deaths of at least 24 people. In one incident in Tank District ten people were killed and 10 wounded after supporters of a losing candidate threw hand grenades at the celebrating supporters of the winner.

== See also ==
- 2021–22 Khyber Pakhtunkhwa local elections
