= Barian =

- Location within Pakistan
- Coordinates: 33.57°N 73.23°E
- Country: Pakistan
- Province: Punjab
- District: Murree
- Time zone: UTC+5 (PST)

Barian, Barrian or Bariyan is a town in Murree District of Punjab, Pakistan. It is located at 33°57'0N 73°23'0E. The town is linked to the city of Abbottabad by a 71 km road via Nathia Gali, the area is often cut off during bad winter weather, in 2005 heavy snowfall had cut the roads to Khanspur and Changla Gali, and in January 2008 snow and heavy landslides cut off roads.
