= Phallah =

- Union council
- Location of Phallah within Abbottabad District
- Interactive map of Phallah
- Coordinates: 33°52′8.51″N 73°13′9.04″E
- Country: Pakistan
- Province: Khyber-Pakhtunkhwa
- District: Abbottabad
- Tehsil: Lora

Government

Population
  - Total: 20 000

Phalla is a Union council and village of Abbottabad District in the Khyber Pakhtunkhwa province of Pakistan. According to the 2017 census it had a population of 2,484 of which 1,143 were male and 1,341 female.

== Villages ==
The Union Council of Phallah contains the following villages:

- Battal Kund
- Dhakhan Paiser
- Dheri Rakhala
- Ghambeer
- Phallah
- Rahi

== Location ==
Phallah Village lies in a scenic valley along the Lora–Shah Maqsood Road, approximately 6 miles from Lora and 16 miles from Ghora Gali. The village is nestled between two prominent mountains—Muri and Khadan. Access from the Lora side is via a narrow road known as Gali.

Upon entering the valley, visitors see a cluster of homes built closely together, giving the impression of a multistory structure. Nearby villages include Riala and Rupper, both located about 2 miles west of Phallah. Educational facilities in the area include a Government Middle School and a Primary School for boys in Pallah Gali

Phallah Union Council is located in the southwestern corner of Abbottabad District. It borders Murree to the east, Haripur District to the west, and Islamabad/Rawalpindi District of Punjab to the south. Thanks to its location, Phallah is easily accessible.

The village is divided into two sections—Rara Phallah and Para Phallah—separated by a stream. At the centre of these two parts lies an old water well, which serves as a primary water source for residents.
