= Bara Gali =

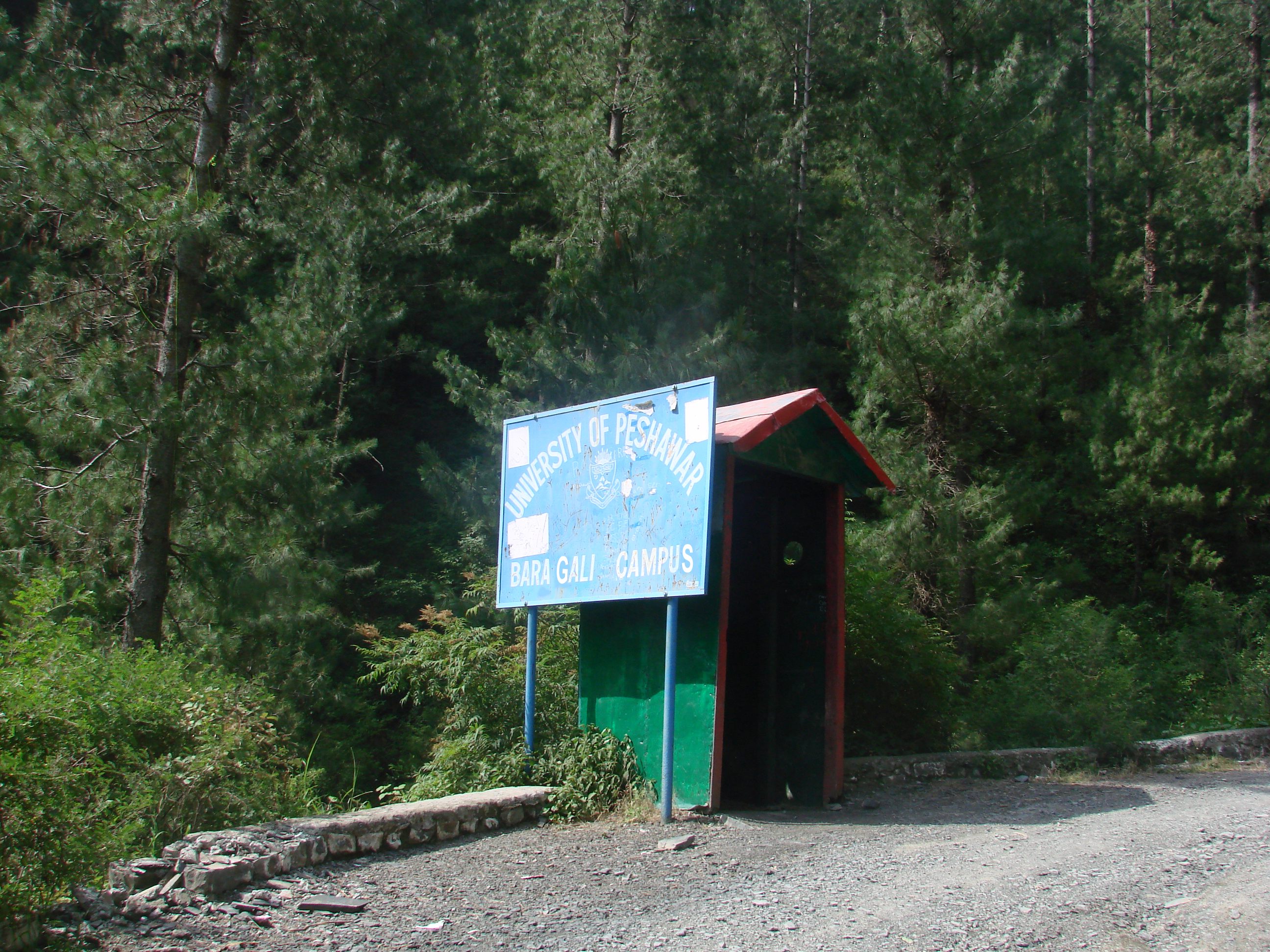
- Bara Gali Summer Campus, Pakistan

- Location within Pakistan
- Coordinates: 34°6′0″N 73°21′0″E
- Country: Pakistan
- Province: Khyber Pakhtunkhwa
- District: Abbottabad
- Elevation: 2,350 m (7,710 ft)

Bara Gali is one of the mountain resort towns of the Galyat and Ayubia National Park, at an altitude of 2,350 metres (7,710 ft). It is located in the Abbottabad District of Khyber Pakhtunkhwa province in northern Pakistan.

The town lies on the road between Abbottabad and Murree, is 15 miles (24 km) from Abbottabad, and 25 miles (40 km) from Murree. Bara Gali is the summer campus of the University of Peshawar.

== History ==
During British Rule, Bara Gali was a small cantonment that was occupied in the hot summer months by one of the British mountain batteries which were stationed at Rawalpindi in the winter.
