= Changla Gali =

- Town
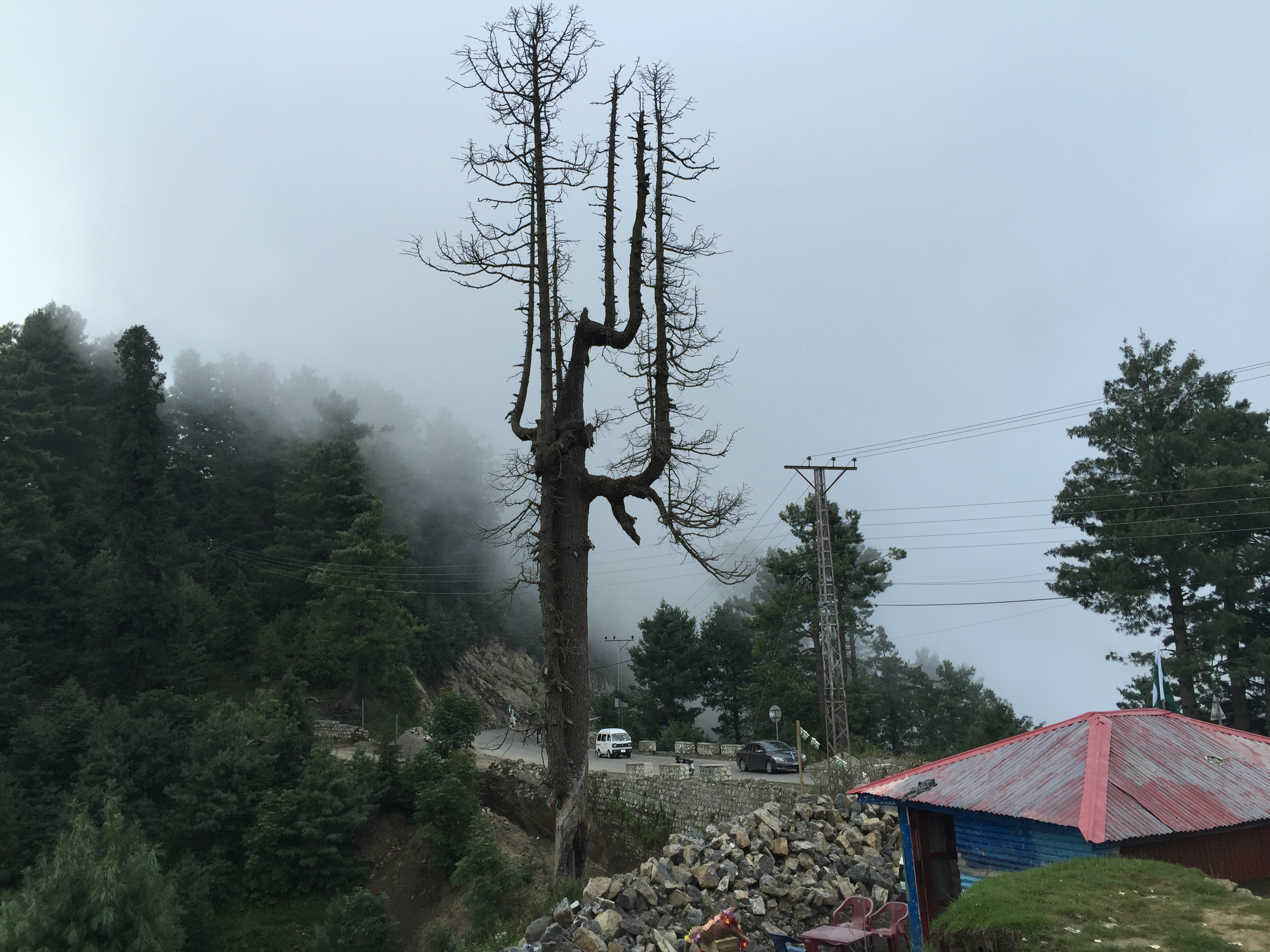

- Location within Pakistan
- Coordinates: 33°59′18.63″N 73°23′17.91″E
- Country: Pakistan
- Province: Khyber-Pakhtunkhwa
- District: Abbottabad District
- Elevation: 2,804 m (9,199 ft)
- Time zone: UTC+5 (PST)

Changla Gali is one of the tourist mountain resort towns of the Galyat area of Pakistan. It has an elevation of 2804m.

== History ==
During British rule it was the headquarters of the Northern Command School of Musketry. In the 1890s Changla Gali, referred to as Changla Gulee, was mentioned by British geologist Charles Stewart Middlemiss when he was doing a survey of the area as part of his geological fieldwork in Hazara for the colonial era Geological Survey of India, he noted how it was half-way halting-place for travellers from Murree to Donga Gali or to Nathia Gali.

== Location ==
Changla Gali is located in Seer Gharbi which is a Union Council of Abbottabad District, and is located 16 km north from the more famous Galyat town of Murree in Rawalpindi District.
