= Darwaza, Abbottabad =

Village in Pakistan

Darwaza
- A picture of village Darwaza near Ayubia
- Country: Pakistan
- Time zone: UTC+5 (PST)

Darwaza is a village near Ayubia, situated in the Palak Union Council of the Abbottabad District, Khyber Pakhtunkhwa, Pakistan. It is located at 34°0'39N 73°25'30E at an altitude of 1788 metres.
