= Rajoya =

Pakistani village

Coordinates: 34°04′43″N 73°13′35″E

Rajoya is a village in the Abbottabad District of Khyber Pakhtunkhwa, Pakistan. According to the 2017 Census of Pakistan, the village contained 1,926 households, with an average household size of 6.81 persons.

== History ==
In the 1890s Rajoya, referred to as Rujoeeuh, was mentioned by British geologist Charles Stewart Middlemiss when he was doing a survey of the area as part of his geological fieldwork in Hazara for the colonial era Geological Survey of India, he described it as one of a "few large villages" that lay along the course of the Dore river.
