= Makool Tarli =

Makool Tarli (Urdu: مکول ترلی) is a village in Abbottabad District, Khyber Pakhtunkhwa, Pakistan. According to the 2023 Population and Housing Census of Pakistan, the village had a population of 2,569.
