= Bahawalpur Province =

Proposed Province in Punjab, Pakistan

Bahawalpur Province (Urdu: صوبہ بہاولپور, romanized: Sūbā Bahāwalpūr) is the name for the proposals to create a new province in Pakistan consisting of the Bahawalpur Division in Punjab. If established, it would result into the restoration of the former state of Bahawalpur (1748–1955). It was discussed as early as 1989, and was recommended by the parliamentary committee on new provinces in January 2013, to be created in the southeastern region of Punjab. The Bahawalpur province proposal has been a subject of debate amongst various political parties along with the South Punjab province proposal.

== See also ==
- Bahawalpur (princely state)
