= Batnara, Muzaffarabad =

Pakistani village

Batnara
- Location within Pakistan
- Coordinates: 34°22′25″N 73°40′0″E
- Country: Pakistan
- Province: Azad Kashmir
- Elevation: 2,093 m (6,867 ft)
- Time zone: UTC+5 (PST)

Batnara is a village in the Neelum valley of Muzaffarabad District, Azad Kashmir, Pakistan. It is located at an altitude of 2093 metres (6870 feet) above sea level.

The village was severely affected by the 2005 Kashmir earthquake, with residents reportedly travelling for several days to obtain assistance. In August 2025, villagers held protests over what they described as a lack of government investment in the area.
