= Haider Zaman Khan =

Pakistani political leader (1934-2018)

Sardar Haider Zaman

Personal details
- Born: 1934
- Died: 24 October 2018 (aged 84)
- Party: Pakistan Muslim League (Jinnah); Hazara Qoumi Mahaz
- Profession: Former Nazim (counselor) of Abbottabad District; Former Minister in NWFP Assembly of Pakistan

Baba Haider Zaman (1934 – 24 October 2018) was a Hazarewal politician from the Hazara region of Khyber Pakhtunkhwa province in Pakistan.

He was one of the leading figures of Hazara Province Movement for the separation of the Hazara Division from the province Khyber Pakhtunkhwa of Pakistan. Haider Zaman joined Hazara Qumai Mahaz on 17 January 2009 for the cause of a separate Hazara province. He had also served as a Provincial Minister and District Nazim of Abbottabad District.

== Biography ==
Haider Zaman Khan was born in the Dewal Manal village of Abbottabad District in 1934, to the Karlal tribe. He completed his FA degree (12th grade high school equivalent in some countries) in the 1950s and joined the Pakistan Air Force. After retirement, he entered politics in 1962 but failed to win a provincial seat.

In 1977, he took part in the Movement for the Restoration of Democracy against Zia-ul-Haq's regime and got arrested for it.

He got elected to the NWFP assembly from Abbottabad in 1985. The then chief minister Arbab Jehangir Khan appointed Zaman as the labour and human resource minister in his cabinet.

During his tenure as nazim, he rose to prominence for opposing the renaming of the NWFP to Pakhtunkhwa. He criticised the President of Pakistan, Asif Ali Zardari, for referring to the province as Pakhtunkhwa - saying this was unconstitutional and done to please coalition partners.

Zaman said he was in contact with the nazims of the southern districts and all five nazims of the erstwhile Hazara Division opposed the name change. If the district was renamed in line with the proposal from the Awami National Party then, according to Zaman, a creation of a Hazara Province would be justified.

He was also involved in a petition against the provincial government of the NWFP claiming that they were curtailing the powers of district government. In March 2006, five months after a devastating earthquake struck the region, Zaman said repatriation of people from tent villages (set up in the aftermath of the earthquake) might be held up due to lack of resources possessed by the district governments. That year he also supported an initiative to raise awareness of the effects of the earthquake.

In 2007, he criticised Pakistani tour operators for the way they organised the Hajj and Umrah arrangements for pilgrims in Saudi Arabia, he also claimed that the tour operators were fleecing pilgrims and pilgrims were unable to get rid of greedy tour managers.

In 2010, following the renaming of the North-West Frontier Province (NWFP) to Khyber Pakhtunkhwa (KP), Khan was again prominent by his opposition to the new name, he became the head of the Action Committee for Hazara province – he stated that the new name of the province is on an ethnic basis and so deprived the people of Hazara of their identity. In August 2010, Khan stated that the people of Hazara would stop payments of utility bills until their demands were met.

== Death ==
Baba Haider Zaman Khan died on 24 October 2018 at age 84. and was buried in his home village. He was hospitalized for a few days before his death.

== See also ==
- Hazara province movement
