= Haro River =

River in Pakistan

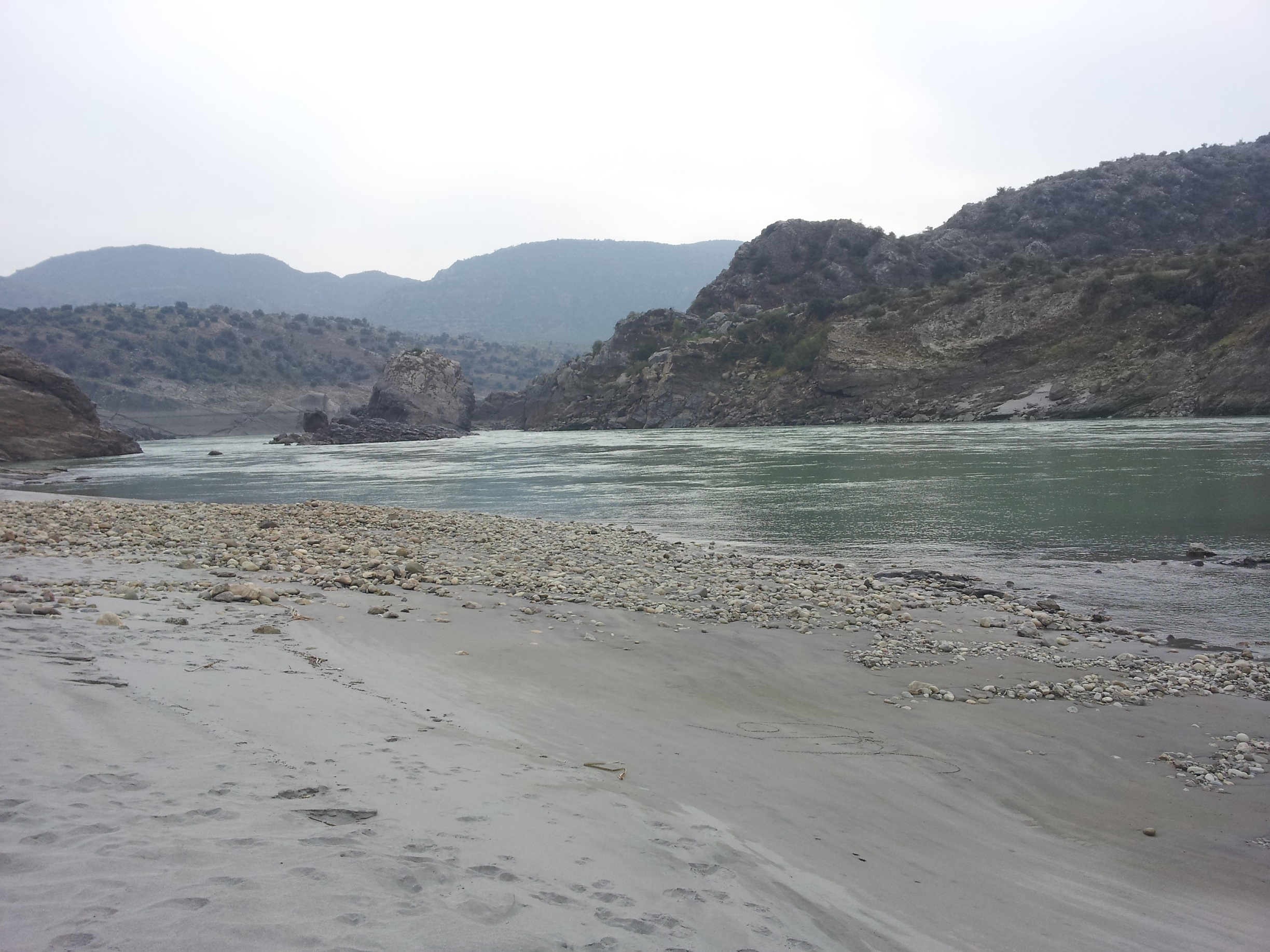
- The river in the Bagh Nilaab region

- Location within Pakistan

Physical characteristics
- Source
  - location: Dunga Gali
  - coordinates: 33.9060914°N 73.377423°E
- Mouth
  - coordinates: 33.7672704°N 72.243408°E

Basin features
- Progression: Indus→ Arabian Sea
- River system: Indus River

The Haro (Urdu: دریائے ہرو) is a river in Pakistan that flows through Khyber Pakhtunkhwa and parts of Punjab. It is a left tributary of the Indus. Its main valley is in Abbottabad District, in the Hazara Division of Khyber Pakhtunkhwa Province, northern Pakistan. The famous Khanpur Dam has been built on this river at Khanpur in the Haripur District of Hazara Division to provide drinking water to the twin cities, i.e. Islamabad (the capital of Pakistan) and Rawalpindi. The decrease in inflows from Khanpur dam from the Haro River results in a water shortage in the twin cities during the summer season.

The Haro River rises at the southern end of the Dunga Gali range, where it has two branches. The eastern branch of the river is called Dhund, and the western is called Karral - these two branches appear to be named after the Dhund and Karlal tribes respectively. The River Haro enters Rawalpindi District near Bhallan and flows through Attock District.

It is fed by four major tributaries:

1. The Lora Haro, rising in the Murree Hills around Lora
2. The Satora Haro, rising in the Galiat Mallach hills
3. Both Lora Haro and Satora Haro merge at Dotara near Jabri
4. The Neelan, rising in the Nara Hills
5. The Kunhad, draining the area of Siribang and Dubran.

Minor tributaries include the following rivulets.

- Chanjah
- Jab Kattha
- Sajikot kattha
- Najafpur Kattha

This river joins the Indus near Ghazi Barotha Dam.
