= Karachi Province movement =

Pakistani province movement

A map of Karachi Division, the proposed area to be made into a separate province.

The Karachi Province movement is the movement and proposal to create a new province in Pakistan by carving out the area of Karachi, the largest city in Pakistan and the current provincial capital of Sindh province. It originated in February 1969, when student activists belonging to a left-wing faction of the National Students Federation (NSF) formed the Jeay Karachi Committee and demanded the creation of a Karachi province.

The modern movement has largely been spearheaded by the Muttahida Qaumi Movement (MQM), while the proposal is heavily opposed by the Pakistan People's Party (PPP). Several minor parties and movements have also supported making Karachi a province. Alternate versions of the proposal have called for making Karachi a federal territory of Pakistan.

Karachi is the former capital of Pakistan, and a megacity with distinct ethnolinguistic and demographic features compared to the rest of Sindh. Karachi is the only division of Sindh with an Urdu-speaking majority; 50.7% of its population is Urdu-speaking and 11.1% is Sindhi-speaking, (Note: Per data from the 2023 Pakistani census.) making it a Sindhi-minority provincial capital of a Sindhi-majority province. Karachi generates around 12-15% of Pakistan's GDP and contributes 55% of federal tax revenue. Karachi also contributes almost 96% of taxes collected in Sindh province as well.

A map of the literacy rate of Sindh's districts as of 2023.

Karachi's districts also have the highest literacy rates in Sindh, while Sindh's literacy rate lags well below the national literacy rate of 60.7%.
