= Dor River =

Pakistani River

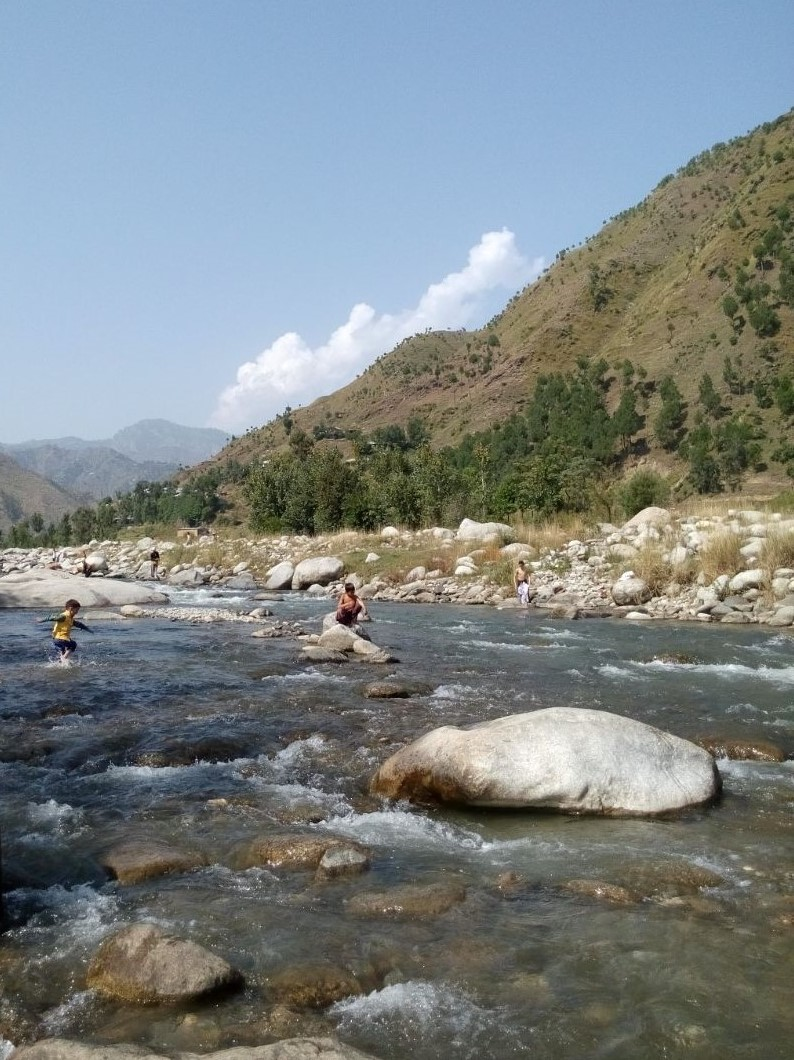

Location
- Country: Pakistan
- Region: Hazara
- District: Abbottabad

Physical characteristics
- Mouth: Tarbela Lake
  - coordinates: 34°04′12″N 72°53′21″E

Basin features
- Cities: Havelian
- Bridges: Ayub Bridge Havelian

The Dor River is a river near the city of Havelian in Abbottabad District in the Khyber Pakhtunkhwa province of Pakistan. The Dor River Havelian has a length of about 60 km (37 mi).

== History ==
During the colonial era - geologist Charles Stewart Middlemiss had been sent to assess coal near the Dor River as the Punjab government were eager for details about this (until 1901 Hazara was part of Punjab), but his findings were so extensive and interconnected that he ended up conducting a full geological survey of Hazara. The Dor River has a rich history in the Hazara region of KPK. it connects Karakoram Highway to Gilgit-Baltistan and other parts of Pakistan with the help of Ayub bridge.
