= 1885 Bengal earthquake =

Earthquake in South Asia

- UTC time: 1885-07-14
- Local date: 14 July 1885
- Magnitude: 6.9-7

The 1885 Bengal earthquake, also known as the Manikganj earthquake occurred on 14 July 1885 in Manikganj, Bengal, British India. The earthquake had an estimated moment magnitude (Mw) of 6.9–7.0. Its likely epicentre was near Kodalia in present-day Saturia Upazila, Manikganj District and approximately 170 kilometres from Dhaka. The earthquake caused substantial damage and casualties in Dhaka and several other districts of Bengal.

== Earthquake ==
The damaging earthquake caused widespread destruction in Dhaka. The earthquake's likely epicentre was near Kodalia in Saturia Upazila, approximately 170 kilometres from Dhaka. It was estimated at magnitude 7.0 (Mw). The earthquake was felt throughout Bengal Province extending westwards into Chota Nagpur and Bihar, northwards into Sikkim and Bhutan, as well as eastwards into Assam, Manipur and Burma. Loss of life and property occurred at Bogra, Jamalpur, Sherpur, Mymensingh, and Rangpur Districts. Contemporary accounts and later historical summaries differ in their descriptions of the earthquake's impact and loss of life.

A seismological study by researchers at the Geological Survey of India reassessed the 1885 earthquake using historical records, including newspaper archives, district gazetteers and Geological Survey of India documents. The study estimated its Mw at 6.9 and reconstructed its intensity distribution using the Medvedev–Sponheuer–Karnik scale. It located the earthquake near the eastern Indian continental margin beneath the Bengal Basin and proposed the north–south-trending Dhubri Fault as a possible source. That fault has also been associated with the 1930 Dhubri earthquake. The earthquake has also been associated with the deep-seated Jamuna Fault.

== See also ==
- List of historical earthquakes
