= 2021–22 Khyber Pakhtunkhwa local elections =

Pakistani provincial elections

- 19 December 2021 (Phase I); 31 March 2022 (Phase II)

66 tehsils (Phase I) 70 tehsils (Phase II)

	First party	Second party
Party	PTI	JUI (F)
Seats won	45	35
- Results of each tehsil chairman election

The 2021-22 Khyber Pakhtunkhwa local elections were held in 17 districts of Khyber Pakhtunkhwa, Pakistan on 19 December 2021 and 31 March 2022. In the first phase of the election, the Jamiat Ulema-e-Islam (F) (JUI(F)) won 23 tehsil chairman positions while the Pakistan Tehreek-e-Insaf (PTI) won 16 tehsil chairman positions. In the second phase, the PTI won 29 tehsils while the JUI(F) won 12 tehsils.

== First phase ==
The first phase of the election was held on 19 December 2021 across 17 districts.

=== Re-voting ===
On 13 February 2022 re-voting of the first phase were held in 13 different districts.

=== Mayoral elections ===
Mayor of Peshawar Election
Party	Candidate	Votes	%	±%
JUI (F)	Zubair Ali	63,610		
PTI	Muhammad Rizwan Khan	51,523		
ANP	Sher Rehman	49,845		
PPP	Arbab Zarak Khan	46,198		
JI	Bahrullah	18,390		
PML(N)	Nek Zada	2,372		
Independent	Muhammad Ibrahim	1,858		
Independent	Shoaib Khan	1,542		
Independent	Kifayat Ullah	1,284		
Independent	Amin Jan	1,258		
Independent	Zia Ullah Afridi	1,123		
Independent	Shamsher Khan	1,092		
PRHP	Muhammad Anwar Khan	1,015		
Independent	Amir Iqbal Khalil	884		
Independent	Nadeem	377		
Independent	Muhammad Siddique Ur Rehman Paracha	205		
Independent	Muhammad Tahir Shah	170		
Turnout		265,859		
Rejected ballots		23,113		
Majority		12,087		
Registered electors		880,003		
JUI (F) gain from PTI		Swing	{{{swing}}}	

Mayor of Mardan Election
Party	Candidate	Votes	%	±%
ANP	Himayat Ullah Mayar	56,458		
JUI (F)	Amanat Shah Haqqani	49,938		
PTI	Lakhkar Khan	30,383		
JI	Mushtaq Khan	17,196		
Independent	Kaleem Ullah Khan	13,254		
PPP	Asad Khan	12,230		
Independent	Zahir Shah	8,384		
PML(N)	Syed Inayat Khan Bacha	6,849		
BPP	Anwar Shah Bacha	1,613		
Independent	Jalil Ul Mulk	727		
Turnout		213,974		
Rejected ballots		16,097		
Majority				
Registered electors		550,577		
ANP hold		Swing	{{{swing}}}	

== Second phase ==
The second phase will be held in March in the remaining districts.

== See also ==
- 2015 Khyber Pakhtunkhwa local elections
