= Havelian =

Municipality in Pakistan

Havelian حویلیاں
- Municipality
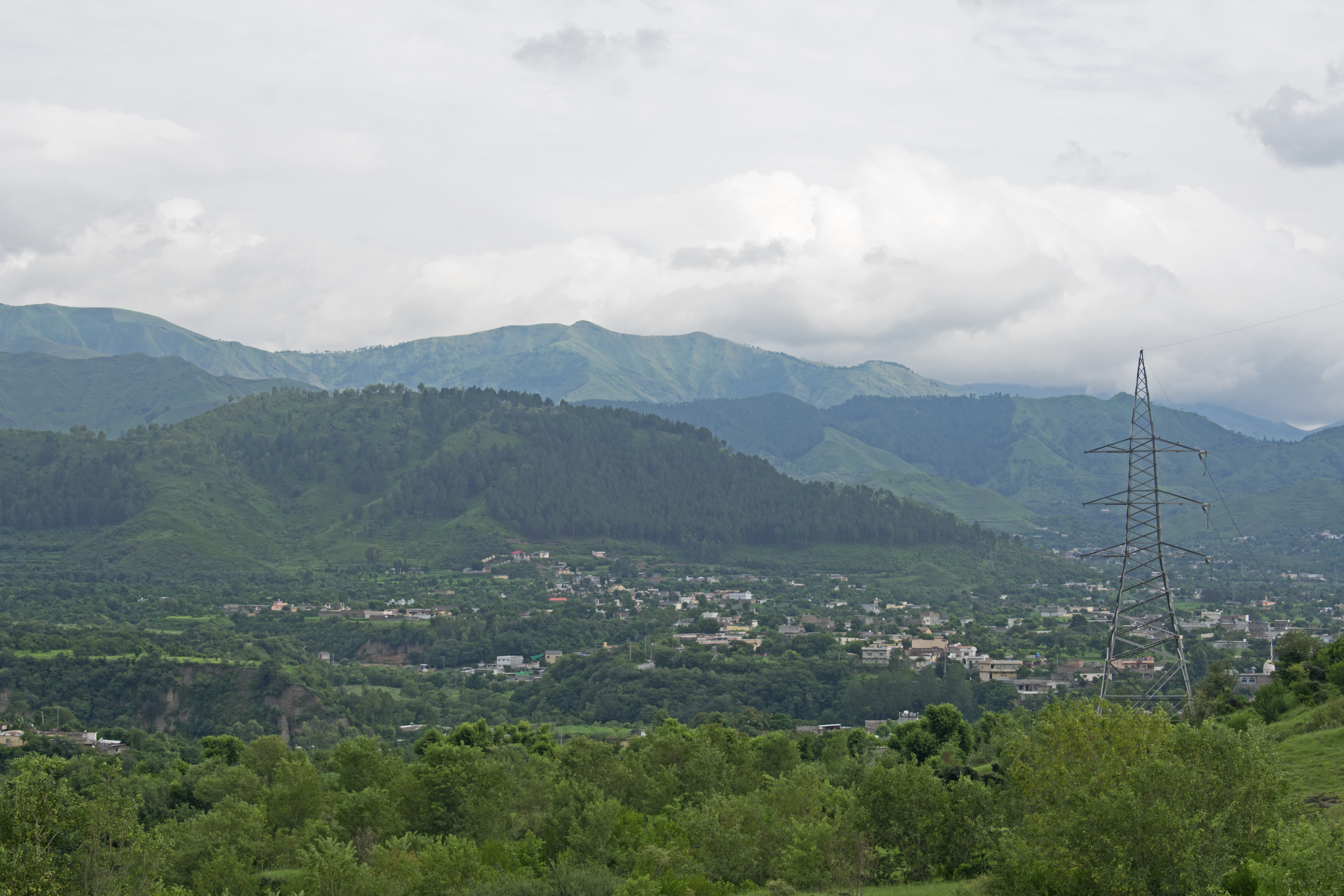
- Panorama of Havelian Village from the other bank of the Dor

- Location within Khyber Pakhtunkhwa Location within Pakistan
- Coordinates: 34°03′11″N 73°09′12″E
- Country: Pakistan
- Province: Khyber Pakhtunkhwa
- District: Abbottabad
- Tehsil: Havelian Tehsil

Area
  - Total: 12.5 km^{2} (4.8 sq mi)

Population (2023)
  - Total: 37,509
  - Density: 3,000/km^{2} (7,770/sq mi)
- Postal code: 22500

Havelian (Urdu: حویلیاں [ɦəˈʋeːlɪjãː]) is the second largest municipality in the Abbottabad District, in the Hazara Division, Khyber Pakhtunkhwa province of Pakistan. It serves as the headquarters for Havelian Tehsil. The word literally translates into English as "mansions". The outskirts of the city are also home to one of the largest ordnance factories of Pakistan, Pakistan Ordnance Factories Havelian. An ordnance depot also exists in the vicinity of the city and the factory.

== History ==
In the 1890s Havelian, referred to as Huveliyan, was mentioned by British geologist Charles Stewart Middlemiss when he was doing a survey of the area as part of his geological fieldwork in Hazara for the colonial era Geological Survey of India, he described it as one of a "few large villages" that lay along the course of the Dore river.

== Geography ==
Havelian is located on the Karakoram Highway and on the banks of Dor River, about 15.5 kilometers south west of Abbottabad, and is also an important rail transit route.

== Demographics ==
=== Population ===
Historical population
| Year | Pop. | ±% p.a. |
|---|---|---|
| 1951 | ... | — |
| 1961 | 4,671 | — |
| 1972 | 7,803 | +4.78% |
| 1981 | 16,305 | +8.53% |
| 1998 | 31,625 | +3.97% |
| 2017 | 48,295 | +2.25% |
| 2023 | 37,509 | −4.12% |

As of the 2023 census, Havelian had a population of 37,509.

== Transport ==
Havelian's main public transport consist of auto rickshaws, modified Suzuki pickup vehicles, tongs, which can accommodate anywhere from 8 to 13 people at a time. Taxis and automobiles for hire are also available. Vans and buses are frequently used for connecting Havelian to the surrounding cities and towns in the region.

Prime Minister Nawaz Sharif performed the groundbreaking ceremony of the Hazara Motorway, a road link of the China-Pakistan Economic Corridor, on November 29, 2014. The 60-kilometre, 4-lane expressway will cost Rs33 billion. The Hazara Motorway will reduce the drive time from Islamabad to Havelian to just 30 minutes, additionally providing a road to the Havelian Dry Port project. The project anticipates hundreds of thousands of employment opportunities, possibilities of new business ideas, and a socio-economic uplift of the whole region. CM KPK Parveez Khattak announced a bypass from Havelian to Damtor and another bypass from the Havelian city to Havelian Village. The CM also announced a network of roads in Havelian.

== Railway ==
Havelian is the last railway station while traveling to the northern areas of Pakistan in KPK province.

Havelian is the terminus of a branch railway.

In February 2007, consultants investigated the construction of a railway link to China. The line would cross the 4,730m-high Khunjerab Pass.
