= Karlal =

- کڑلال
- Religions: Islam
- Languages: Hindko, Pahari
- Country: Pakistan
- Region: Hazara, Khyber Pakhtunkhwa

The Karlal (Urdu: کڑلال), also known as Karral, Kiraal, and Sardar are a Hindko- and/or Pahari-speaking tribe, dwelling mostly in the Abbottabad District of the Hazara Division of Khyber Pakhtunkhwa, Pakistan.

== History ==
In 1957, Mohammad Abdul Ghafoor Hazarvi, a Karlal, became the first recipient of the highest civilian award of Pakistan, the Nishan-e-Imtiaz. Most Karlals today are still living in their ancestral villages in the Galiyat and the Nilan Valley of the Abbottabad District. More recently, the Karlals, led by Baba Haider Zaman Khan along with some other tribesmen of Hazara, have engaged in a political struggle to separate the Hazara Division from Khyber Pakhtunkhwa in order to form the Hazara Province.
