= Havelian Tehsil =

Administrative subdivision in Pakistan

Coordinates: 33°56′N 73°07′E

Havelian Tehsil تحصیل حویلیاں
- Tehsil
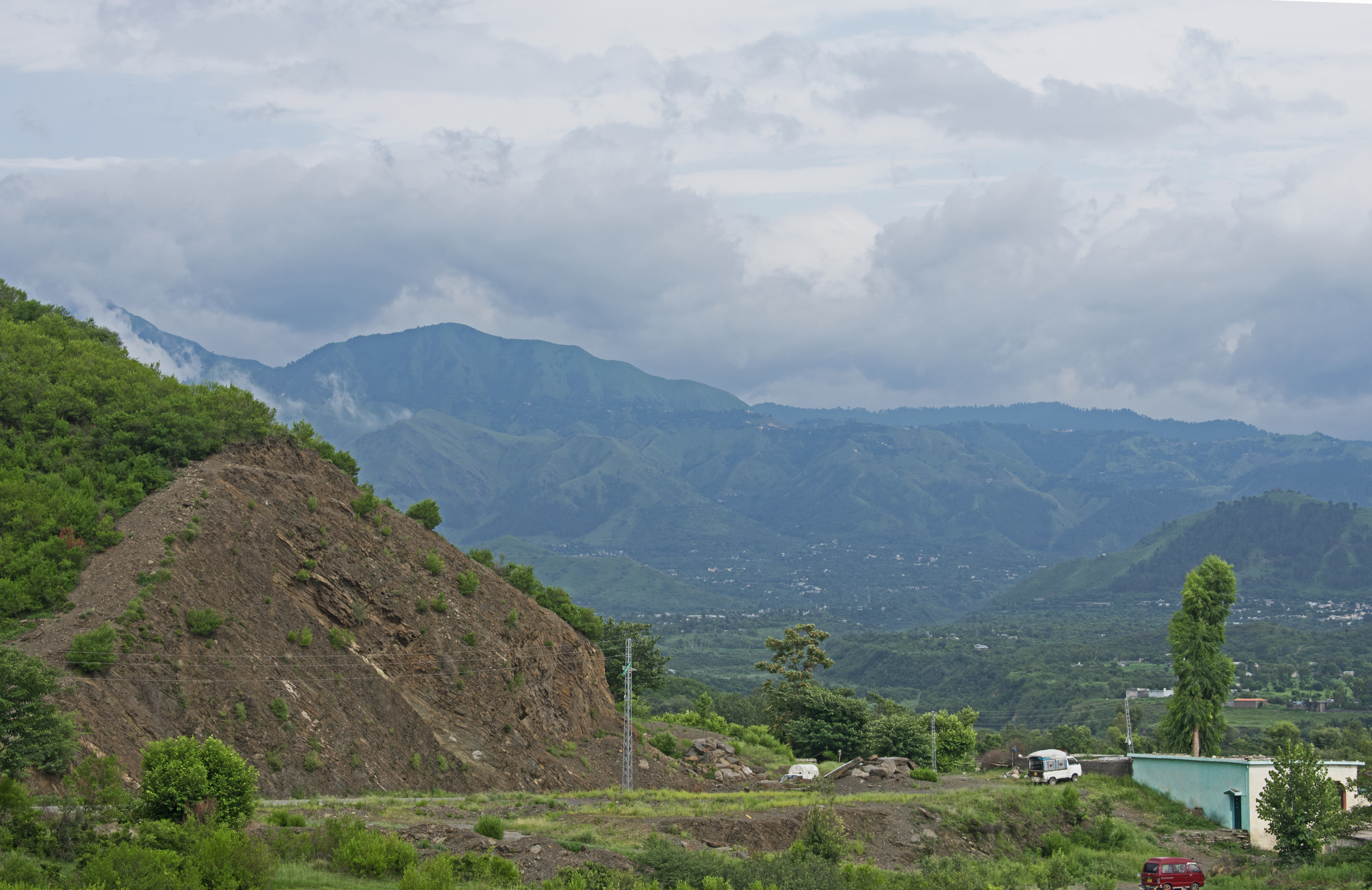
- The valley of the Dor

- Country: Pakistan
- Province: Khyber Pakhtunkhwa
- District: Abbottabad
- Headquarters: Havelian

Government
  - Chairman: Uzair Sher Khan (IND)

Population (2017 Census of Pakistan)
  - Total: 351,322
- Time zone: UTC+5 (PST)
- Number of towns: 1
- Number of Union Councils: 16

Havelian Tehsil is an administrative subdivision (tehsil) of Abbottabad District in the Khyber Pakhtunkhwa province of Pakistan.

== History ==
During British rule, the current district of Abbottabad was created as an administrative subdivision tehsil of Hazara District. After the independence of Pakistan it remained a tehsil of Hazara until 1981, when the old Abbottabad Tehsil became a district. Subsequently, the district was split into two tehsils, namely Abbottabad and Havelian.

== Demography ==
According to the 2023 census the total population of Havelian Tehsil was 200,329 of which 99,396 were male and 100,931 were female. The census also recorded religious affiliation as follows: 255703 Muslim, 945 Christians, 1 Hindus, 2 Ahmadi Muslims, 10 Sikhs and 47 listed as others.

Religious affiliation of residents
Religion	Followers	Percentage
Muslim	255,703	99.62%
Christian	945	0.37%
Hindu	1	0.00%
Ahmadi Muslim	2	0.00%
Sikh	10	0.00%
Others	47	0.02%

The mother tongue of residents were recorded as follows: 7,479 Urdu, 1,795 Punjabi, 295 Sindhi, 7,263 Pushto, 65 Balochi, 240 Kashmiri, 355 Saraiki, 236,897 Hindko, 91 Brahvi, 177 Shina, 19 Balti, 12 Mewati, 1,153 Kohistani and 869 listed as others.

Mother tongue of residents
Language	Speakers	Percentage
Urdu	7,479	2.86%
Punjabi	1,795	0.69%
Sindhi	295	0.11%
Pushto	7,263	2.78%
Balochi	65	0.02%
Kashmiri	240	0.09%
Saraiki	355	0.14%
Hindko	236,897	90.61%
Brahvi	91	0.03%
Shina	177	0.07%
Balti	19	0.01%
Mewati	12	<0.01%
Kohistani	1,153	0.44%
Others	869	0.33%

== Subdivisions ==
=== Municipal Committees ===
- Havelian (Headquarters)

=== Cantonments ===
- Havelian Cantonment

=== Union Councils ===
- Nara
- Havelian
- Nagri Totial
