= Palak Union Council =

Coordinates: 34.0000°N 73.0000°E

Palak
- Union council
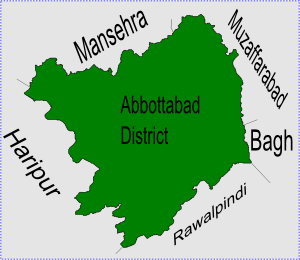
- Palak is located in Abbottabad District
- Interactive map of Palak
- Country: Pakistan
- Province: Khyber Pakhtunkhwa
- District: Abbottabad
- Tehsil: Abbottabad

Population (2017)
  - Total: 13,275

Palak is one of the 51 union councils of Abbottabad District in the Khyber Pakhtunkhwa Province of Pakistan. The Union Council has seven seats, two for women, 1 peasant \ workers, 1 for youth and one minotiry seat.
