= Nagri Totial =

Town in Pakistan

- Union council
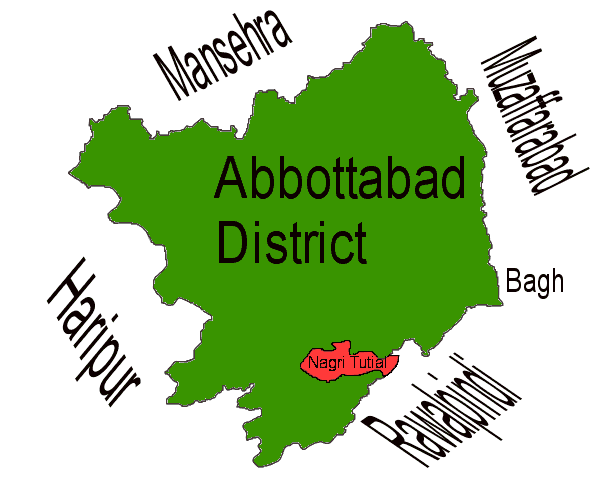
- Location of Nagri Tutial (highlighted in red) within Abbottabad district, the names of the neighbouring districts to Abbottabad are also shown.
- Coordinates: 33.93333°N 73.3167°E
- Country: Pakistan
- Province: Khyber Pakhtunkhwa
- District: Abbottabad
- Tehsil: Lora

Government
  - Nazim: Muhammad Ibrahim PTI
  - Naib Nazim: Muhammad Ibrahim Abdul Qayoom

Population (2017 Census of Pakistan)
  - Total: 12,623

Nagri Totial, also known as Nagri Tutial, is one of the 57 union councils of Abbottabad District in Khyber Pakhtunkhwa province, Pakistan. According to the 2023 census the total population was 14,002 of which 6,983 were male and 7,019 female.

== Demography ==
Nagri Tutial or the town of the Tutials is named after a Dhund Raja (chief) Toota Khan, who was a son of Doomat Khan.

The villagers of Nagri Totial predominantly belong to the 'Totialian' branch of the Dhund (Abbasi) tribe, named after Raja Toota Khan, an Abbasi chief. They have settled along a stretch southeast of Abbottabad, extending to Ghora Gali near Murree in the east. Additionally, some Qureshis, Awans, and Bhattis also reside in the village.

== History ==
The village has a unique history. Before the partition, Hindus and Sikhs lived alongside Muslims in harmony, until many fled to India during that period.

== Geography ==
Nagri Tutial is situated in the south east of the district and forms part of Abbottabad district's frontier with the Punjab (Nagri Tutial's eastern border is with Punjab's Rawalpindi Tehsil). Nagri Tutial shares a border with the following Union Councils within Abbottabad District - to the North and east by Seer Gharbi, to the west by Nara, and to the south by Lora. Nagri Tutial has an average elevation of 1243 metres (4081 feet). Lora, the nearest town to Nagri Totial, is accessible by road.

The Haro River cuts across the village of Nagri Totial, this can cause problems during heavy rains - in October 2025 the authorities warned people to be vigilant are a car was washed away by the river and two people were missing.

As part of the Galiyat area, Nagri Totial is prone to heavy snowfall in winter months which can cause problems for the people in the area due to power outages and other issues.
