= Lora, Abbottabad =

Pakistani village

Lora لورا
- Interactive map of Lora
- Coordinates: 33°53′0″N 73°17′0″E
- Country: Pakistan
- Province: Khyber Pakhtunkhwa
- District: Abbottabad
- Tehsil: Lora
- Union Council: Lora

Lora is a village in the Abbottabad District of the Khyber Pakhtunkhwa province of Pakistan. The village serves as the headquarters of the Union Council and tehsil of the same name. Lora has a bus station that has services to neighbouring villages, there are also government offices based in Lora.

It is situated at an altitude of 1,148 metres (3,769 feet) above sea level. It lies in the southern part of Abbottabad District and was formerly part of Havelian Tehsil. Lora now serves as the administrative headquarters of Lora Tehsil.

== Health ==
As the headquarters of a Lora Tehsil, Lora Hospital is equipped with basic medical and surgical facilities. During the second wave of the COVID-19 pandemic, the hospital received medical and surgical equipment through joint assistance from the European Commission for Humanitarian Aid and CARE International.

== Demography ==
According to available records, Lora village has a total population of 7,530, comprising 3,681 males and 3,849 females. Of these, 7,473 residents are recorded as Muslim, while 57 belong to other faiths.

== Transport ==
Lora is connected to Abbottabad via the Ghora Gali–Shah Maqsood Road. Travel time from Abbottabad is approximately three hours by bus and about two hours by car. Murree is located around 22 kilometres (14 mi) from Lora and can be reached in approximately 40 minutes, while Islamabad is about 60 kilometres (37 mi) away.
