= Charles Stewart Middlemiss =

British geologist who worked in British India and the Princely States

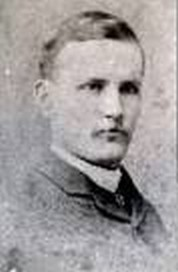
Photo of Charles Stewart Middlemiss taken in 1882

Charles Stewart Middlemiss FRS (1859 – 11 June 1945) was a British geologist who worked in British India and the Princely States.

After education at Caistor Grammar School, Middlemiss matriculated in 1878 at St John's College, Cambridge, and graduated there in 1881 with B.A. and then spent two more years in private study of geology.

== Career ==
On 20 September 1883, he was officially selected for service in India by the British government while still in Europe. The following day, 21 September 1883, he joined the Geological Survey of India as Assistant Superintendent. In India he joined as 3rd grade assistant on 29 December 1883 thus beginning his role in the Geological Survey of India at a junior level. In 1884 he was assigned fieldwork in the Himalayan regions of Jaunsar and Kumaun (modern-day Uttarakhand).

He officiated in 2nd grade from 7 May to 7 November 1884, having been temporarily promoted to a higher grade (2nd grade assistant) for six months. Middlemiss passed in the Vernacular examinations on 6 October 1884 after successfully passing a language proficiency exam in a local Indian language (likely Hindi or Urdu), which was often required for administrative or field roles.

Between 1884 and 1886 Middlemiss continued his geological work in Kumaun while also being assigned to investigate the Bengal Earthquake in 1885. He officiated as Deputy Superintendent, 2nd grade, from 20 May 1886, temporarily holding a senior post, indicating recognition of his expertise and leadership.

The next year in the Himalayan town of Nainital on 6 June 1887 he married Martha Frances Wheeler, whose father was Major-General Frederick Wheeler.

In the summer of 1890 Middlemiss was introduced to the geology of Hazara by William King who was then Director of the Geological Survey of India. Middlemiss then spent most of the cold weather season alone in Hazara until the Black Mountain Campaign allowed him to be able to push his survey into Hassanzai and Akazai country.

During his service Middlemiss did field work in the Himalayas, the Salt Range and Hazara; in Coimbatore, Salem and the Vizagapatam Hill Tracts in the Madras Presidency; in the Shan States and Karenni in Burma; in Bombay, Central India and Rajputana, and finally in Kashmir. During spells at Headquarters he was Curator of the Geological Museum in 1898–1899, and in charge of the Headquarters Office during 1907–1908.

In the service of the Geological Survey of India he became in 1889 Deputy Superintendent and in 1895 Superintendent, retiring in April 1917. He then went into the service of the Maharaja of Kasmir and Jammu. He was given the title of Superintendent, Mineral Survey of Jammu and Kashmir State, and held this position from 1917 to 1930.

== Later life ==
He returned to the UK in 1930 and settled at Crowborough in East Sussex. He died in hospital in the nearby town of Tunbridge Wells in Kent in 1945.

== Awards and honours ==
- 1900 — Fellow of the Geological Society of London
- 1914 — Lyell Medal
- 1916 — C.I.E.
- 1921 — Fellow of the Royal Society

== Selected publications ==
- The Geology of Hazara and the Black Mountain. Memoirs of the Geological Survey of India. Vol. 26. Calcutta. 1896.
- The Kangra Earthquake of 4th April 1905. Memoirs of the Geological Survey of India. Vol. 38. Calcutta. 1910.
- The Geology of Idar State. Memoirs of the Geological Survey of India. Vol. 44, Part 1. Calcutta. 1921.
