= Nara, Abbottabad =

Nara
- Union council
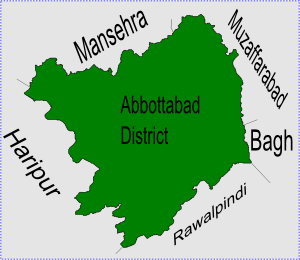
- Nara is located in Abbottabad District
- Interactive map of Nara
- Coordinates: 33°59′N 73°13′E
- Country: Pakistan
- Province: Khyber-Pakhtunkhwa
- District: Abbottabad
- Tehsil: Havelian

Government
  - Nazim: Sajjad
  - Naib Nazim: Saleem Akhtar

Population
  - Total: 15,690

Nara is one of the 51 union councils of Abbottabad District in the Khyber-Pakhtunkhwa province of Pakistan; it is located in the southern part of the district.

== History ==
During the Second Sikh War after gaining the support of the Mashwani tribe – James Abbott set up base with the forces of Jageerdar of Nara. The base was vital to keep an eye on Chatar Singh and his forces, Abbott wrote:

"I had no roofs, no tents for the shelter of my picturesque bands. Each shifted for himself, amongst the ravines, the rocks and bushes. It was the rainy season, but happily for us, no rain actu-ally fell. The favourite bivouak was a deep ravine, south of the ruined village. The spring there wells forth from the base of the cliff, the only water procurable within an area of several miles. Here natural excavations in the cliff sheltered some, trees, shrubs and rocks others, and nearly the whole of the men crowded there. Being clad in the black cotton garb of the Pathans of the Indus, the effect was truly wild and savage. The standards varied, according to the taste of each chief. Our only martial music was the harsh clarinet of the mountains, which, as played by the natives, resembled the bagpipe or hurdy gurdy; a dolorous strain, well calculated to fill an enemy with the blue-devils. Such was the state of my Camp."

Abbott then marched his forces eastwards to Salhad to battle Chatar Singh.

Abbott would return to Nara later in the war when the entry of the Afghans on the side of the Sikhs threatened to undo all his efforts and break his alliances, he called a jirga and managed to obtain fealty from the local tribes, this provided to be a turning point in his and the East India Company's fortunes.

Once the war was over Lord Dalhousie praised Abbott for the "gallant stand" in the hills of Hazara and it was at Nara that Abbott held a farewell feast that his replacement Herbert Edwardes observed.

And there for three days and nights ... he might be seen walking among the groups of guests and hecatombs of pots and cauldrons the kind and courteous host of a whole people."

According to Edwardes, after the event had finished and Abbott departed, he was escorted along the way by a "weeping and lamenting" crowd of Hazarawals.

In the 1930s, Sir Olaf Caroe, asked an elderly Yusufzai from Hazara if he had ever met Abbott, he confirmed he had and described him as "a little man with bristly hair on his face and kind eyes, and we loved him. I was in the jirga when he was asking us if we would stand and fight the Sikhs if he stood by us. We swore we would, and there were tears in our eyes, and a tear in Abbott Sahib's eye too. And we did! He was our father, and we were his children. There are no Angrez like Abbott Sahib now."

== Demography ==
According to the 2023 census the Union Council of Nara had a total population of 8,746 of which 4,214 were male and 4,532 were female.

Population Data by Village
Village	Total Population	Male Population	Female Population
Gohra	1,782	906	876
Mera-Utla	969	490	479
Mohribadbhen	703	397	306
Nara	5,292	2,421	2,871
