= Union councils of Pakistan =

Lowest level of local government in Pakistan

The union councils of Pakistan (Urdu: یونین کونسل), are the lowest tier of local government bodies in the country. They are headed by a chairperson, and a vice chairperson. Union Councils in Pakistan are established under the respective Local Government Acts of all provinces and federal units. Pakistan is a federal country where local government is the third level of government following federal and provincial governments.

They form the second-tier of local government and the last tier overall in Pakistan's administrative structure. The structure and responsibilities of union councils differ across provinces and territories of the country.

As of 2007, there were 5,375 rural union councils across 115 districts.

== Administration ==
Union councils are the primary governmental institution in Pakistan. They are often known as "local councils" in urban and rural areas. In rural areas union councils are formed by combining some of the surrounding villages and in urban areas they consist of some urban neighborhoods.

Headed by a union chairperson, each union council has some elected members or councillors. In addition to four male and two female members elected directly, there are two male and two female representatives of the labour, a minority member, a Union Chairperson, and his deputy, known as Union vice chairperson. Besides elected members, there are several government employees and functionaries in every union council, who report to the secretary of the union council. The latter is a civil servant appointed by the state. The addition of seats for minority members and special interests was partly driven by a reluctance among specific group to run for election when the union council system was first implemented.

Union councils perform numerous functions including levying taxes, building infrastructure, and acting as an alternative dispute resolution system.

=== Structure ===
Shown below is a simplified structure of the political hierarchy, the federal government governs the provinces (allocation of resources and policy decisions), the provinces govern the districts etc., the union councils are involved directly in local government administration.

Federal government
Province
District
Tehsil
Union Council

=== Example ===
For example, Abbottabad District in Khyber Pakhtunkwa province is made up of four tehsils: Abbottabad, Havelian, Lower Tanawal and Lora in this example only Lora and three of its Union Councils are shown

Federal Government
KPK Government
Abbottabad District
Lora
Lora	Seer Gharbi	Goreeni
