= List of Army Burn Hall College alumni =

This list of Army Burn Hall College alumni includes students who studied at any of ABHC’s campuses in Abbottabad, Pakistan. This article summarizes some of the more notable ABHC alumni, or Hallians - as they are called - with some indication of the reasons they are notable in the world. The Burn Hall Alumni Association is the official and formal community of Hallians which has numerous national and international chapters.

Members of this list must either have an existing Wikipedia article or be referenced with reliable sources that mention the school.

== Alumni ==
- Professor Dr Akbar S. Ahmed (born 1943), Cambridge University, CSP, author, producer of the film Jinnah; studied (1954–1959)
- Lt Gen (R) Ali Kuli Khan Khattak, Pakistan Army
- Professor Hassan Abbas, scholar and writer, studied 1981-83 Hassan Abbas (legal scholar)
- Ex Chairman Senate, Acting President Wasim Sajjad
- Admiral (r) Noman Bashir, former Pakistan Navy officer
- Salman Bashir, former Foreign Secretary of Pakistan
- Maj Gen (r) Mahmud Ali Durrani (1947–1959), ex-Ambassador to the US; former National Security Advisor to PPP/Zardari Govt
- Lt Gen Farrakh Khan SI(M)(1957), former Chief of General Staff, former DG Pakistan Rangers
- Lt Gen (r) Munir Hafiez, former Pakistan Army general and ex-Chairman NAB
- The Nawab of Junagarh (circa 1960s), present Nawab Sahib Muhammad Jahangir Khanji
- Habibullah Khan Swati (The Second), 14th Chief of the Swati tribe, 7th Nawab of Neelishang State, 10th "Khan of Garhi Habibullah"
- Prof Daud Kamal, Pakistani poet and scholar
- Prof Dr Ajmal Khan, Vice-Chancellor of the Islamia College University, Peshawar
- Nawabzada Salahuddin Saeed Khan ex-MNA and Chief of Tanoli tribe
- Chaudhary Nisar Ali Khan (1968 Senior Cambridge), Member of National Assembly, political party PML-N; present leader of the opposition, since 2008
- Gohar Ayub Khan, politician, son of late Gen Muhammad Ayub Khan
- Naeem Rashid, the hero and victim of Christchurch mosque shootings
- Wing Commander Mervyn Middlecoat, airforce ace pilot and 1971 War hero
- Lt Gen (r) Tariq Khan, former Pakistan Army general (SC 1973)
- Haissam Hussain, director of the film Bin Roye (2015) and the TV series Durr-e-Shehwar (2012–2012), Aik Nayee Cinderella (2012–2013), Bin Roye (2016–2017).
- Dr Tariq Rahman, linguist, scholar and author, Emeritus Professor at Quaid-i-Azam University, Islamabad, Pakistan
- Miangul Asfandyar Amir Zeb, politician, former education Minister NWFP
- Omar Ayub Khan, MNA and Pakistani minister
- Raja Muhammad Asad Khan, ex-MNA from district Jhelum, Punjab (2002-2012)
- Yousuf Ayub Khan, ex-MPA and ex-provincial minister in NWFP/KPK
- Akbar Ayub Khan, MP from Haripur district, NWFP/KPK (2016)
- Muhammad Azam Khan, Former Principal Secretary to PM Khan.

== See also ==
- Alumnus
- List of Pakistanis
