= Babar Nawaz Khan =

Pakistani politician

- بابرنوازخان

Member of the National Assembly of Pakistan
- Incumbent
- Assumed office 29 November 2025
- Prime Minister: Shahbaz Sharif
- Preceded by: Omar Ayub Khan
- Constituency: NA-18 Haripur
- In office 6 November 2015 – 31 May 2018
- Prime Minister: Nawaz Sharif
- Preceded by: Raja Aamer Zaman
- Constituency: NA-19 (Haripur)

Personal details
- Born: Haripur, Pakistan
- Party: PMLN (2015-present)
- Relatives: Chaudhry Wajahat Hussain (brother-in-law)

Babar Nawaz Khan (Urdu: بابر نواز خان; born 24 August 1986) is a Pakistani politician who had been a member of the National Assembly of Pakistan, from November 2015 to May 2018. Babar Nawaz Khan was born to a Utmanzai Pathan (Hindko Speaking ) family in Haripur, in 1986. He is the son of late politician and Senator "Shaheed e Awam" Akhtar Nawaz Khan. His family belongs to the semi-tribal area of Khyber Pakhtunkhwa called Utman Upper Keya Khabal Area now in Haripur.

== Early life and education ==
He was born in Haripur in 1986. He was educated at the Jinnah Jame High School & College and received FSC (Pre Engineering Degree) from Board of Intermediate Abbottabad.

== Political career ==
He ran for the seat of the Khyber Pakhtunkhwa Assembly as an independent candidate from Constituency PK-50 (Haripur-II) in by-polls held in January 2014, but was unsuccessful. He received 24,000 votes and lost the seat to Akbar Ayub Khan.

Khan was elected to the National Assembly of Pakistan as a candidate of Pakistan Muslim League (N) from Constituency NA-19 (Haripur) in a by-elections held in August 2015. He received 137,700 votes and defeated a candidate of Pakistan Tehreek-e-Insaf. During his tenure as Member of the National Assembly, he served as chairman of Standing Committee of the National Assembly on Human Rights. Babar Nawaz Khan's greatest achievement in his tenure from 2015 to 2018 was the supply of Sui Gas to more than 600 villages in Haripur. Khan was the Youngest Parliamentarian during former government tenure.

In the 2018 Pakistani general elections, Babar Nawaz Khan lost to Omar Ayub Khan of PTI from Constituency NA-17 (Haripur). He got 132,756 votes, while Omar Ayub got 172,609 votes.

In the 2024 general elections, Babar Nawaz again lost to Omar Ayub from NA-18 Haripur, this time getting 112,839 votes, while Omar Ayub got 192,948 votes.

NA-18 was vacated after Omar Ayub was disqualified. In the by-elections held on 23 November 2025, Babar Nawaz was elected as MNA as candidate of PML (N), getting 163,996 votes. His opponent Shehernaz Omar Ayub got 120,220 votes, as an independent candidate with backing from PTI.
