= Constituency WR-14 =

Reserved seat in a Pakistani provincial assembly

- Constituency for the Khyber Pakhtunkhwa Assembly

Current constituency
- Member: Aamna Sardar

Constituency WR-14 is a reserved seat for women in the Khyber Pakhtunkhwa Assembly.

== See also ==
- Constituency PK-49 (Haripur-I)
- Constituency PK-50 (Haripur-II)
- Constituency PK-51 (Haripur-III)
- Constituency PK-52 (Haripur-IV)
- Constituency WR-18
