= Ajmal Khan =

Ajmal Khan may refer to:

- M. Ajmal or Ajmal Khan (also Mohammad Ajmal Qadri, 1910–1988), Pakistani actor
- Ajmal Khan (botanist), Pakistani botanist and vice-chancellor of University of Karachi
- Ajmal Khan (Pakistani politician), Provincial Assembly of Khyber Pakhtunkhwa member from Bajaur
- Ajmal Khan (Islamia College University), Pakistani vice-chancellor
- Muhammad Ajmal Khan Chandia, politician from Muzaffargarh, Pakistan
- Ajmal Khan Lahori, Pakistani scholar and politician
- Hakim Ajmal Khan (1868–1927), Indian physician and politician
  - Ajmal Khan Park, Delhi, India
    - Ajmal Khan Road, Delhi, India
  - Ajmal Khan Tibbiya College, Aligarh Muslim University, Aligarh, Uttar Pradesh, India
