= Constituency PK-52 (Haripur-IV) =

- Former constituency for the Khyber Pakhtunkhwa Assembly

Former constituency
- Abolished: 2018

Constituency PK-52 (Haripur-IV) was a constituency for the Khyber Pakhtunkhwa Assembly of the Khyber Pakhtunkhwa province of Pakistan.

== See also ==
- Constituency PK-49 (Haripur-I)
- Constituency PK-50 (Haripur-II)
- Constituency PK-51 (Haripur-III)
- Constituency WR-14
- Constituency WR-18
