= Akbar Ayub Khan =

Pakistani politician (born 1971)

- اکبر ایوب خان

Chief Whip of the Treasury Benches, Provincial Assembly of Khyber Pakhtunkhwa (Note: The assembly has been suspended under governor's rule since 11 October 2026.)
- Incumbent
- Assumed office 24 May 2024
- Chief Minister: Ali Amin Gandapur; Sohail Afridi

Parliamentary Leader of the Sunni Ittehad Council, Provincial Assembly of Khyber Pakhtunkhwa (Note: PTI-backed members of the assembly joined the Sunni Ittehad Council (SIC) in February 2024 and took the oath as its members. In July 2024, after the Supreme Court's reserved-seats ruling, the Election Commission declared 58 of them PTI members. The provincial government and APP have since continued to describe him as "provincial parliamentary leader", and The Express Tribune as the PTI's parliamentary leader.)
- Incumbent
- Assumed office March 2024

Chairman, District Development Advisory Committee, Haripur (Note: A separate post from that of provincial parliamentary leader. The notification of his appointment was reported on 21 July 2024.)
- Incumbent
- Assumed office July 2024

Member of the Provincial Assembly of Khyber Pakhtunkhwa
- Incumbent
- Assumed office 28 February 2024
- Constituency: PK-46 Haripur-I
- In office 13 August 2018 – 18 January 2023
- Constituency: PK-40 Haripur-I
- In office 2014–2018
- Preceded by: Yousuf Ayub Khan
- Constituency: PK-50 Haripur-II

Khyber Pakhtunkhwa Minister for Local Government, Elections and Rural Development
- In office 18 September 2020 – 5 August 2021
- Chief Minister: Mahmood Khan
- Preceded by: Kamran Bangash (as special assistant)

Khyber Pakhtunkhwa Minister for Parliamentary Affairs and Human Rights (additional charge)
- In office June 2021 – 5 August 2021
- Chief Minister: Mahmood Khan
- Preceded by: Fazal-i-Shakoor Khan
- Succeeded by: Shaukat Ali Yousafzai

Khyber Pakhtunkhwa Minister for Law and Parliamentary Affairs (additional charge)
- In office 16 February 2021 – 20 May 2021
- Chief Minister: Mahmood Khan
- Preceded by: Sultan Mohammad Khan
- Succeeded by: Fazal-i-Shakoor Khan

Khyber Pakhtunkhwa Minister for Elementary and Secondary Education
- In office 4 January 2020 – 18 September 2020
- Chief Minister: Mahmood Khan
- Preceded by: Ziaullah Bangash (as adviser)
- Succeeded by: Shahram Khan Tarakai

Khyber Pakhtunkhwa Minister for Communication and Works
- In office 2018 – 4 January 2020
- Chief Minister: Mahmood Khan
- Succeeded by: Mahmood Khan (held by the chief minister)

Adviser to the Chief Minister of Khyber Pakhtunkhwa (Note: No portfolio was named when his appointment was announced in March 2014; by 2015 he was reported as adviser on communication and works.)
- In office March 2014 – 2018
- Chief Minister: Pervez Khattak

Personal details
- Born: 17 August 1971 (age 55)
- Party: Pakistan Tehreek-e-Insaf (Note: Elected in 2024 as a PTI-backed independent; the assembly lists him as an independent.)
- Parent: Shoukat Ayub Khan (father)
- Relatives: Ayub Khan (grandfather); Gohar Ayub Khan (uncle); Yousuf Ayub Khan (brother); Arshad Ayub Khan (brother); Omar Ayub Khan (cousin)
- Education: Army Burn Hall College; Matriculation (1988)
- Occupation: Politician, businessman, landowner

Akbar Ayub Khan (Urdu: اکبر ایوب خان; born 17 August 1971) is a Pakistani politician who has been elected three times (2014, 2018 and 2024) to the Provincial Assembly of Khyber Pakhtunkhwa from Haripur District. A grandson of President Ayub Khan, he was first elected in a January 2014 by-election for the seat vacated by the disqualification of his elder brother Yousuf Ayub Khan, and served as an adviser to Chief Minister Pervez Khattak, latterly on communication and works, for the rest of that assembly's term.

Re-elected for the Pakistan Tehreek-e-Insaf (PTI) in 2018, he served in Chief Minister Mahmood Khan's cabinet as minister for communication and works, for elementary and secondary education, and for local government. His appointment as education minister in January 2020 drew criticism because his highest recorded qualification is matriculation. He resigned from the cabinet in August 2021, citing his health and constituency commitments.

After the unrest of 9 May 2023 he was named in police cases in Haripur and was reported to have gone abroad. He won a third term as a PTI-backed independent in 2024, was parliamentary leader of the Sunni Ittehad Council, under whose banner the PTI-backed members sat, from March 2024, and was notified as chief whip of the treasury benches in May 2024, and, separately, as chairman of Haripur's District Development Advisory Committee in July 2024. He held these posts when the assembly was suspended under governor's rule in October 2026.

== Early life and family ==
Khan earlier in his career

Akbar Ayub Khan was born on 17 August 1971 to Shoukat Ayub Khan. He is a grandson of the former president Ayub Khan. Dawn has described Ayub Khan's descendants as a "politically significant Tareen clan of Haripur" and has called the family the "Tareens of Rehana"; its ancestral graveyard is in Rehana village, Haripur.

He is the younger brother of Yousuf Ayub Khan, a former provincial minister for communication and works, and the brother of Arshad Ayub Khan, who became a provincial minister in 2021. The former federal minister and PTI general secretary Omar Ayub Khan is his first cousin, and the former foreign minister Gohar Ayub Khan is his uncle.

Defending his appointment as education minister in 2020, the provincial information minister said Akbar Ayub had left his studies in the 12th grade and moved to Canada. His election nomination papers record matriculation as his highest qualification, as did the provincial assembly's website in 2020, which recorded it as completed in 1988. In those papers he gave his occupation as businessman and landlord, and before his first election The Express Tribune described him as running his own construction company.

== Political career ==
=== By-election (2014) ===
The PK-50 Haripur-II seat fell vacant when an election tribunal disqualified Yousuf Ayub, then the provincial minister for communication and works, on 27 September 2013. The petition had been brought by Yousuf's opponent, Qazi Muhammad Asad, and the University of the Punjab produced records showing that the graduation degree Yousuf had submitted for the 2002 election was fake. The Supreme Court upheld the disqualification on 13 November 2013.

Yousuf nominated Akbar, a first-time candidate with no previous political experience, to contest the by-election. His cousin Omar Ayub, by contrast, had joined the PML-N before the 2013 general election and was then its member of the National Assembly for Haripur. Asad, standing for the Pakistan Muslim League (N) (PML-N), was backed by the former assembly speaker Habibullah Khan Tareen, a relative of the family who was said to have played a key role in Yousuf's unseating. PTI chairman Imran Khan and Awami Muslim League leader Sheikh Rasheed Ahmad addressed rallies in Akbar's support, and The Express Tribune described him as new to parliamentary politics and relying on his brother's vote bank and influence. During the campaign rival candidates accused him of holding Canadian as well as Pakistani nationality; he said he had already given up his Canadian nationality. Rivals also said his campaign had benefited from a recent rally in Haripur by Chief Minister Pervez Khattak, which Akbar Ayub called "purely coincidental".

Polling took place on 23 January 2014. Unofficial results on polling night gave Akbar Ayub 25,671 votes, ahead of Asad and the independent Babar Nawaz Khan (19,417). (Note: Asad's polling-night total was reported as 19,969 by Dawn and as 19,669 by The Express Tribune.) Fuller unofficial figures reported by The Express Tribune the next day put him at 26,957, against 23,760 for Babar Nawaz and 22,028 for Asad.

Babar Nawaz accused the provincial government of using official machinery to influence the result and said he had seen police stamping ballot papers in Akbar Ayub's favour. His camp also alleged that the PTI's provincial president, Azam Swati, had pressured election staff at polling stations, which Akbar Ayub rejected. The Free and Fair Election Network (FAFEN) recorded 24 violations of the electoral code of conduct, and its press release reported policemen stamping ballots at one unnamed polling station. Reports differ on whether the returning officer ordered a constituency-wide recount. The Express Tribune reported on 24 January that he had done so, and on 29 January that he had rejected the request, after which Babar Nawaz applied to the Election Commission of Pakistan (ECP) for a recount of all 116 polling stations. Akbar Ayub retained the seat and was named an adviser two months later.

=== Adviser to the chief minister (2014–2018) ===
In late March 2014 the provincial government announced that Akbar Ayub would join Khattak's cabinet as an adviser; no portfolio was named. He was later adviser on communication and works, the portfolio his brother had held, and remained an adviser until the end of the assembly's term in 2018. In November 2015 he attended the meeting at which Khattak approved six development schemes for Haripur and Abbottabad districts, including an engineering college, an information technology training centre and a sports ground in Haripur. In the 2015 local government elections the family backed opposing candidates. Omar Ayub, then a PML-N member of the National Assembly, worked to get his party's candidate elected Haripur tehsil nazim, while his cousin Yousuf Ayub supported the PTI's candidate. Omar later decided not to stand in the by-election for his National Assembly seat, NA-19 Haripur, where Akbar and Yousuf campaigned for the PTI candidate, Raja Aamir Zaman, against the PML-N's nominee. In August 2016 he briefed the press before work began on the 81-kilometre Swat Motorway, which he called the largest project in the province's history; he said the Rs41 billion contract had been awarded to the Frontier Works Organization through competitive bidding under the province's public–private partnership law. According to Dawn, he initiated a bypass road in Haripur, and he inaugurated the building of a trauma centre (see below).

=== Provincial minister (2018–2021) ===
Ahead of the 2018 election Akbar Ayub was the only aspirant for the PTI ticket in the redrawn PK-40 Haripur-I constituency. A rival aspirant for a neighbouring seat objected to the party awarding tickets to three members of the Ayub family: Akbar, his brother Arshad and his cousin Omar. Akbar Ayub won PK-40 with 66,624 votes to 46,007 for Qazi Muhammad Asad Khan, listed as the PML-N candidate, according to provisional results, on a turnout of 49.41 per cent. (Note: Dawn had reported in April 2018 that Asad had left the PML-N to contest a different constituency as an independent.) He took the oath on 13 August 2018.

==== Communication and works ====
He was sworn in as a minister without portfolio in Mahmood Khan's cabinet on 29 August 2018, (Note: Both reports spell his name "Akhtar Ayub Khan".) and was given communication and works a few days later. In April 2019 he said that Prime Minister Imran Khan was expected to inaugurate the Swat Motorway the following month, and promised that it would open before Eid al-Fitr as an "Eid gift" from the government. No formal inauguration took place then; the road was opened temporarily for Eid traffic in June 2019, with the prime minister's formal opening still expected about two months later.

Khan at a meeting

In July 2019 he set out plans for a road between Peshawar and Dera Ismail Khan, a bypass from Badaber to Chamkani and a dual carriageway on the Hattar road. The following month, at a meeting with an Asian Development Bank delegation, he said that roads across the province, including its northern districts, would be developed under the Provincial Roads Infrastructure Project. In December 2019 he briefed the chief minister at the launch of the province's first online registration system for government contractors, which he said replaced manual registration by 12 to 15 departments.

==== Elementary and secondary education ====
In a cabinet reshuffle on 4 January 2020 Akbar Ayub was moved to elementary and secondary education, replacing the chief minister's adviser Ziaullah Bangash. An unnamed source told Dawn that he had himself asked to leave communication and works because of problems with contractors arising from limited cash flow; the chief minister kept that portfolio himself. Information Minister Shaukat Yousafzai said the reshuffle was based mainly on performance.

The appointment was widely criticised, especially on social media, because his nomination papers showed only matriculation. Gulf News reported that opposition leaders and commentators called Yousafzai's justification "bizarre", noting that Imran Khan had promised to declare an education emergency. Yousafzai called Akbar Ayub "exceptionally qualified", citing his command of English and his record at communication and works, and said there was "no education standard for elected candidates". Akbar Ayub told a private television channel that his qualifications were inconsequential because he had experience in educational and administrative affairs. In February 2021, when he was given the additional charge of the law department, Aaj News again headlined him as a "matric-pass" minister.

Days after taking office he faced opposition questions in the assembly over a teachers' recruitment test in Bannu and Lakki Marwat. Opposition leader Akram Khan Durrani alleged that the paper had leaked with the involvement of senior education officials, and that a former adviser on education had owned shares in the testing agency. Akbar Ayub said the matter was held up by a court stay and that the government would blacklist the agency if irregularities were found. Closing an education debate in September 2020, he said 12,000 teachers had been recruited and an agreement signed with a testing agency to recruit 30,000 more, including 5,000 for the merged tribal districts, and that the government had approved 1,000 community schools. Sardar Hussain Babak of the Awami National Party alleged that the National Testing Service had collected Rs55 billion from jobless candidates and demanded a National Accountability Bureau inquiry into testing agencies. Akbar Ayub rejected allegations of corruption and favouritism in recruitment through private testing agencies, saying the department could not itself shortlist hundreds of thousands of applicants.

==== Local government ====
On 18 September 2020 Akbar Ayub was reassigned to local government, elections and rural development, previously handled by Special Assistant Kamran Bangash, and Shahram Khan Tarakai succeeded him at education. Asset statements released by the ECP in November 2020 showed him, then a provincial minister, owning assets worth Rs230 million. On 16 February 2021 he was given the additional charge of law and parliamentary affairs after Sultan Mohammad Khan resigned. In April 2021 Speaker Mushtaq Ghani, rebuking ministers as powerless before the bureaucracy, asked him to decide "whether you are the minister or the secretary is your minister"; Akbar Ayub acknowledged that he was unable to rein in the bureaucracy and promised action through the cabinet. Law, parliamentary affairs and human rights were assigned to the new minister Fazal-i-Shakoor Khan on 20 May 2021, and in early June parliamentary affairs and human rights were returned to Akbar Ayub.

Answering an opposition motion in May 2021 over the demolition of a public square and the alleged award of works without tender in Bannu, he said the government was ready to examine all leases of government property issued over the previous 20 years; the opposition rejected the proposed panel and demanded a parliamentary committee. In July 2021 he said the province had completed preparations for local government elections under a new two-tier system of village or neighbourhood councils and tehsil or city councils, with union and district councils abolished, and that the schedule would follow the cantonment board elections. On 3 August 2021 he presented the Khyber Pakhtunkhwa Probation and Parole Bill, which the assembly adopted.

==== Departure from the cabinet ====
Akbar Ayub left the cabinet on 5 August 2021. The chief minister's special assistant on information, Kamran Bangash, said he had resigned because of health problems and to give more time to his constituency, and the chief minister accepted the resignation. In his own statement Akbar Ayub cited his health and constituency commitments, and his handwritten letter referred to a "recently diagnosed illness". He was de-notified the same day, and parliamentary affairs and human rights passed to Shaukat Ali Yousafzai.

=== Out of cabinet (2021–2024) ===
Akbar Ayub remained a member of the assembly. In the December 2021 local elections, in which Dawn described the Ayub family as the key player in Haripur, he and his brothers backed the PTI's Akhtar Nawaz Khan for chairman of Haripur tehsil; Akhtar Nawaz lost by a wide margin to the independent Samiullah Khan. The assembly was dissolved on 18 January 2023.

After the protests of 9 May 2023 that followed Imran Khan's arrest, Haripur police registered cases against more than 25 PTI activists for blocking roads and trying to attack government buildings; Haripur's acting district police officer said Akbar Ayub was among those named in the FIRs. In June 2023 Omar Ayub said police had raided Akbar's homes at night without search warrants, and later that month police raided the Haripur homes of Omar, Yousuf, Akbar and Arshad Ayub, none of whom was present. In August 2023 party and police sources told Dawn that Akbar and Yousuf had been out of the country since the protests, and in September Dawn, citing PTI sources, reported that Akbar had gone abroad to avoid arrest.

=== Third term (2024–present) ===
In December 2023 Akbar Ayub obtained nomination papers for PK-46 Haripur-I for the February 2024 election. He stood as the PTI's nominee, seeking a third consecutive win; observers saw the main contest as between him and Qazi Muhammad Asad, by then an independent, while a first cousin, Zafir Khan Tareen, was the nominee of the PTI-Parliamentarians. On 2 February 2024 police detained his brother Yousuf, who was leading Akbar's and Arshad's campaigns, under public-order laws. In challenging the detention, Yousuf's lawyers told the Peshawar High Court that the family faced harassment and "unwarranted raids", and that a high court bench had ordered on 30 January that no action be taken against the brothers until further orders. On 7 February the high court suspended the detention order and ordered Yousuf's release.

Campaign poster for PK-46 in 2024, showing his electoral symbol, the dove (fakhta)

Like other PTI-backed candidates, Akbar Ayub appeared on the ballot as an independent. He won with 68,835 votes to 28,327 for Asad, on a turnout of 48.18 per cent, according to unofficial results. After the election Dawn reported that he and Arshad were among the senior leaders the PTI was considering for chief minister, with Ali Amin Gandapur and Mushtaq Ghani the front-runners. He took the oath on 28 February 2024, and the assembly lists him as an independent. To claim a share of the reserved seats, the PTI-backed winners had joined the Sunni Ittehad Council (SIC) on 21 February 2024, and most of those in the provincial assembly took the oath as SIC members; after the Supreme Court awarded the PTI reserved seats in July 2024, the Election Commission declared 58 of the assembly's SIC members to be PTI members on 29 July, but after the court reversed that ruling on review it declared all PTI and SIC members of the assembly independents in July 2025. Asad petitioned the ECP for a recount or re-poll, alleging that his agents had been denied result forms and that bogus votes had been cast. In August 2025 the ECP dismissed the petition, noting the 40,508-vote margin recorded in Form-47 and finding no reliable evidence of irregularities that had materially affected the result.

==== Chief Whip of the Provincial Assembly, Provincial Parliamentary Party Leader and Chairman DDAC Haripur ====
On 24 May 2024 Chief Minister Gandapur nominated Akbar Ayub chief whip of the treasury benches, a role involving co-ordination with party members and negotiation with other parties. In July 2024 he was notified as chairman of Haripur's District Development Advisory Committee (DDAC); according to a 2025 court petition, the chief minister had appointed ruling-party legislators to chair the DDACs of 30 districts that year. Separately, he had been notified as parliamentary leader of the SIC in the assembly in March 2024. After the PTI-backed members were recognised as PTI members in July 2024, the provincial government and the state news agency APP continued to call him the "provincial parliamentary leader"; The Express Tribune has called him the PTI's parliamentary leader. The assembly's website lists his past membership of its standing committees on finance and on planning and development.

Khan speaking in the Provincial Assembly of Khyber Pakhtunkhwa

In October 2024, after the government withdrew its own Khyber Pakhtunkhwa Police (Amendment) Bill, Akbar Ayub laid a revised bill, which Dawn described as a diluted version; the assembly passed it unanimously and without debate. In January 2025 he complained in the house that the provincial government owed Rs13 billion to Swabi, Haripur and Mansehra districts and Rs18 billion to oil- and gas-producing districts. The following month the assembly passed, on his motions, the Pak-Austria Fachhochschule Institute of Applied Sciences and Technology Haripur Bill, 2025, and the Institute of Management Sciences (Amendment) Bill, 2025.

At a session on 5 September 2025 he asked that the commander of the army's XI Corps and the provincial police chief brief the assembly on counter-terrorism strategy, saying lawmakers were unaware of the discussions of the province's apex committee and that "those responsible for fighting terrorism should come and brief us". At the same session he said the merged districts were being denied funds and called for a special flood relief package for the province. Days later he pressed for members from districts affected by terrorism to be included in a new assembly security committee.

When Sohail Afridi succeeded Gandapur as chief minister in October 2025, Akbar Ayub continued as chief whip. (Note: Some 2026 press reports described him as a provincial minister; assembly documents from May 2026 list him as "MPA/Chief Whip".) After the PTI-backed candidate Shehrnaz Omar Ayub (Note: Dawn spells her name "Sheher Naz Umar Ayub Khan".) lost the NA-18 Haripur by-election in November 2025, which the PTI said had been rigged through Form-47, he addressed a PTI protest in Haripur that blocked the Grand Trunk Road. He objected to the returning officers, said he would not let the PML-N's member-elect lay gas pipelines, and demanded fresh elections: "We do not need such assemblies". In April 2026 he said the PTI wanted Imran Khan released through an expedited legal process rather than immediately, and called the delays in the cases against Khan and his wife an injustice.

After a gas pipeline explosion at the Hattar Industrial Estate on 14 April 2026 killed at least eight people, he called in the assembly for the causes to be identified and those responsible held to account. In May 2026 he was named to the assembly's Parliamentary Committee on the Constitutional and Financial Rights of the province, and chaired a PTI parliamentary party meeting at which members complained that some districts had been left out of an expanded cabinet; according to unnamed sources, members threatened to boycott assembly sessions. In June 2026, amid reports of a possible forward bloc, he was named to a six-member PTI committee headed by Asad Qaiser to resolve differences within the provincial party. In July he was among those convened by the speaker to review a contested bill on members' privileges. On 7 August 2026 the assembly unanimously passed his resolution rejecting any move to include Haripur, Abbottabad or any other district of the province in Islamabad and declaring every district an inseparable part of Khyber Pakhtunkhwa.

On 11 October 2026 the federal government imposed governor's rule in Khyber Pakhtunkhwa, suspending Afridi's government, with an emergency in 12 districts; Hazara Division, which includes Haripur, was exempted from the emergency. The assembly was suspended and its secretariat closed. On 20–21 October Akbar Ayub took part in an online meeting of the PTI's provincial parliamentary party, which tasked Gandapur with negotiating with the federal government to end governor's rule.

== Constituency work in Haripur ==
=== Roads and bridges ===
According to Dawn, Akbar Ayub initiated the Haripur bypass during the 2013–2018 PTI government. The 25-kilometre road links about 20 villages with the Grand Trunk Road and the Hazara Motorway and was intended to relieve congestion on the Grand Trunk Road. As minister he visited the site in November 2018 and told the provincial highway authority to finish the road on schedule. In June 2019 Dawn reported that its cost had risen from Rs4.7 billion to Rs9.686 billion and that a shortage of funds threatened delays; he said the approved funds would soon be released and the road completed on time; the deadline was December 2019. At the end of September 2019 he said the second phase, from Khanpur Road to Chappar Road, would be finished within two months. Chief Minister Mahmood Khan inaugurated the bypass, together with the Shah Maqsood–Kohala Bala–Pir Sohawa road, on 1 June 2021 at an event Akbar Ayub attended.

In December 2018 he inaugurated the Rs100 million Akhoon Bandi bridge over the River Daur, which he said he had had approved during his previous term. In May 2020 he announced that work would begin on widening the Rs1.17 billion, 20-kilometre Beer–Kalinjar road, saying the union councils it served had long been neglected.

=== Health and water supply ===
As adviser he inaugurated the building of a 40-bed, Rs60 million trauma centre in Haripur in October 2017; the health department then failed to provide the machinery and staff it needed. In March 2019, as minister, he inaugurated the centre as an operational facility after a delay of more than three years; it was to have at least 75 staff. During his June 2021 visit the chief minister announced a medical college for Haripur and the upgrading of its district headquarters hospital to Category A. In July 2021 Akbar Ayub said work had begun on a Rs210 million drinking water scheme for Haripur city, funded by the German development bank KfW, including about 60 kilometres of main pipeline and 30 kilometres of distribution lines, and that a Rs70 million storm-water drain along the Hazara Highway had been completed.

=== Technology, education and housing ===
In May 2019 he said the provincial government had approved an information technology park and a "digital city" for Haripur, which he said would create 35,000 jobs. He repeated the jobs figure to Haripur traders in December 2019, saying he had secured approval for Rs12 billion of projects for the district. On 4 June 2021 he, his brothers and Omar Ayub met Imran Khan to discuss Haripur's development, including plans for Khalabat as a model town and the digital city. In January 2025, with Omar and Arshad Ayub, he visited the Pakistan Digital City site, then under construction, and he and Arshad promised the provincial government's full co-operation. The same month he was present when the chief minister's aide on housing said work on the first phase of a Haripur housing scheme would begin within three to six months.

== Offices held ==
Offices held in the Government of Khyber Pakhtunkhwa and the provincial assembly
Office	From	To	Chief Minister
Adviser to the Chief Minister	March 2014	2018	Pervez Khattak
Minister for Communication and Works	2018 (Note: Sworn in without portfolio on 29 August 2018; the communication and works allocation was reported on 1 September 2018.)	4 January 2020	Mahmood Khan
Minister for Elementary and Secondary Education	4 January 2020	18 September 2020	Mahmood Khan
Minister for Local Government, Elections and Rural Development	18 September 2020	5 August 2021	Mahmood Khan
Minister for Law and Parliamentary Affairs (additional charge)	16 February 2021	20 May 2021	Mahmood Khan
Minister for Parliamentary Affairs and Human Rights (additional charge)	June 2021	5 August 2021	Mahmood Khan
Parliamentary Leader of the Sunni Ittehad Council	March 2024	–	Ali Amin Gandapur; Sohail Afridi
Chief Whip, Treasury Benches	24 May 2024	–	Ali Amin Gandapur; Sohail Afridi
Chairman, District Development Advisory Committee, Haripur	July 2024	–	Ali Amin Gandapur; Sohail Afridi

== Electoral history ==
Elections to the Provincial Assembly of Khyber Pakhtunkhwa
Year	Constituency	Affiliation	Votes	Runner-up	Margin	Turnout	Result	Ref.
2014 (by-election)	PK-50 Haripur-II	Pakistan Tehreek-e-Insaf	26,957 (Note: Unofficial. Polling-night unofficial results gave him 25,671 votes and placed Qazi Muhammad Asad (PML-N) second; the fuller unofficial count shown here placed Babar Nawaz Khan second.)	Babar Nawaz Khan (Independent), 23,760	3,197	–	Won	
2018	PK-40 Haripur-I	Pakistan Tehreek-e-Insaf	66,624 (Note: Provisional figures reported by the Associated Press of Pakistan the day after polling.)	Qazi Muhammad Asad Khan (PML-N, per APP), 46,007	20,617	49.41%	Won	
2024	PK-46 Haripur-I	Independent (PTI-backed)	68,835	Qazi Muhammad Asad Khan (Independent), 28,327	40,508	48.18%	Won	
