= Yousuf Ayub Khan =

Pakistani politician and businessman (born 1961)

- یوسف ایوب خان
- Khan in 2024; Known as Baba-e-Baldiyat ("father of local government")

Minister for Communication and Works, Khyber Pakhtunkhwa
- In office 13 June 2013 – November 2013
- Chief Minister: Pervez Khattak

Member of the Provincial Assembly of Khyber Pakhtunkhwa
- In office 29 May 2013 – 27 September 2013
- Preceded by: Qazi Muhammad Asad Khan
- Succeeded by: Akbar Ayub Khan
- Constituency: PK-50 (Haripur-II)

District Nazim of Haripur
- In office 17 October 2005 – February 2010

Provincial Minister, North-West Frontier Province
- In office 1988–1990; 1997–1999
- Portfolios: Transport (1988–1990); Industries (1997–1998); Communication and Works (1997–1998); Local Government and Rural Development (1998–1999)
- Chief Minister: Aftab Ahmad Khan Sherpao (1988–1990); Sardar Mehtab Ahmed Khan (1997–1999)

Member of the Provincial Assembly of the North-West Frontier Province
- In office 1988–1990; 1993–1996; 1997–1999
- Constituency: PF-40 (Haripur)

Personal details
- Born: 1961 (age 64–65) Rehana, Haripur District, Pakistan
- Party: Pakistan Tehreek-e-Insaf (2011–present)
- Other political affiliations: Pakistan Muslim League (N) (1993–2011); Independent (1988–1993)
- Relatives: Ayub Khan (grandfather); Gohar Ayub Khan (uncle); Omar Ayub Khan (cousin); Akbar Ayub Khan (brother); Arshad Ayub Khan (brother)
- Education: Army Burn Hall College

Yousuf Ayub Khan (also spelled Yousaf or Yusuf; Urdu: یوسف ایوب خان; born 1961) is a Pakistani politician and businessman from Haripur District, Khyber Pakhtunkhwa. A grandson of former President Ayub Khan, he was elected to the provincial assembly of the North-West Frontier Province (now Khyber Pakhtunkhwa) several times from 1988 onwards, served as a provincial minister in governments that included two coalitions with the Awami National Party, holding at various times the Transport, Industries, Communication and Works, and Local Government portfolios, and was District Nazim of Haripur from 2005 to 2010. He won the 2013 general election as a Pakistan Tehreek-e-Insaf (PTI) candidate and became the province's Minister for Communication and Works. Later that year an election tribunal disqualified him for submitting a fake graduation degree before the 2002 election, and the Supreme Court of Pakistan upheld the ruling. He has since stayed active in Haripur politics, mainly through the campaigns of his brothers Akbar Ayub Khan and Arshad Ayub Khan and his cousin Omar Ayub Khan. Among his supporters he is known as Baba-e-Baldiyat ("father of local government").

== Early life and family ==
Yousuf Ayub Khan was born in 1961 in the village of Rehana in Haripur District. His father, Shaukat Ayub Khan, was a son of Field Marshal Ayub Khan, who was President of Pakistan from 1958 to 1969. He is a nephew of the former foreign minister Gohar Ayub Khan and a first cousin of Gohar's son, the PTI politician and former Leader of the Opposition in the National Assembly Omar Ayub Khan. His younger brothers Akbar Ayub Khan and Arshad Ayub Khan are also politicians and have represented Haripur in the provincial assembly. The family belongs to the Hindko-speaking Tareen tribe.

He went to school at Army Burn Hall College in Abbottabad. Alongside politics he has business interests; in 1997 Dawn listed him among the flour mill owners in the ruling provincial coalition.

== Political career ==
=== Provincial politics, 1988–2002 ===
Khan as a young man

Yousuf Ayub Khan entered electoral politics in the 1988 general election, winning the PF-40 seat (then part of Abbottabad District) as an independent candidate with 18,324 votes. After the election the Pakistan People's Party (PPP) and the Awami National Party (ANP) formed a coalition government in the province under Chief Minister Aftab Ahmad Khan Sherpao, with the support of a group of independent members from Hazara and other areas. Yousuf Ayub Khan was one of those independents and served as Minister for Transport from 1988. The ANP withdrew its ministers from the cabinet on 27 April 1989, ending the coalition. Yousuf Ayub Khan stayed in the cabinet until 5 August 1990, when he and Health Minister Shahzada Gustasap Khan announced their resignations, a day before the provincial government was dismissed. He was not returned in the 1990 election, in which the PF-40 seat was won by Habibullah Khan Tareen of the Islami Jamhoori Ittehad.

He returned to the assembly in the 1993 election, winning PF-40 (Haripur-II) as an independent and defeating the Pakistan Muslim League (N) (PML-N) candidate Babar Nawaz Khan. Although the assembly recorded him as an independent member, he aligned himself with the PML-N, which formed a short-lived government under Pir Sabir Shah in coalition with the ANP and independent members in October 1993.

After Aftab Sherpao returned as chief minister in 1994, Yousuf Ayub Khan was among the opposition figures detained during the anti-government agitation that autumn. He was held under the Maintenance of Public Order Ordinance from 8 October 1994 and charged in three cases, including under the sedition law, over processions and speeches in Haripur. He was granted bail in each case but detained again under fresh orders and held in Dera Ismail Khan jail. On 30 November 1994 the Peshawar High Court quashed the detention orders as made "without lawful authority". It found that the cases had been registered weeks after the events and that he and a local PML-N organiser had been singled out from the many people involved.

He kept the seat as a PML-N candidate in the 1997 election and took his oath on 19 February 1997. The PML-N formed the provincial government under Chief Minister Sardar Mehtab Ahmed Khan in coalition with the ANP. Yousuf Ayub Khan, then a senior vice-president of the provincial PML-N, was given two portfolios. At the June 1997 budget session he moved the demands for grants both as Minister for Industries and as Minister for Communication and Works, and in November 1997, as Industries minister, he moved the North-West Frontier Province Consumers' Protection Bill, 1997.

The ANP left the coalition in February 1998 after talks on its demand to rename the province "Pakhtoonkhwa" broke down. The Local Government and Rural Development department, which had been held by the ANP's Farid Khan Toofan, then passed to Yousuf Ayub Khan; the assembly record lists him as Minister for Local Government from 5 March 1998, while he also continued to answer for Communication and Works. In April 1998 Dawn described him as Minister for Industries "holding at least six other portfolios" of the provincial government. The chief minister also asked him to represent him on the province's new privatisation and investment board.

Later in 1998 two of his main portfolios passed to other ministers: Communication and Works, which he still held in July, was held by Syed Ali Shah by September, and Industries was held by Habibullah Khan Kundi by December. He remained Minister for Local Government until the end of the government. In May 1999 he announced that, following an agreement between the federal and provincial governments, the province would abolish octroi and the district export ("zila") tax from the next financial year. The government was removed by the military takeover of October 1999.

In the 2002 general election, held under the military government of Pervez Musharraf, he lost the PF-50 (Haripur) seat to Qazi Muhammad Asad Khan of the Pakistan Muslim League (Q). His own family was divided in that election: his uncle Gohar Ayub Khan was in the PML-Q camp and his cousin Omar Ayub Khan contested the National Assembly seat on a PML-Q ticket. Asad Khan polled 22,314 votes to his 16,117. Dawn noted at the time that he had won the seat three times before. Asad Khan remained his main electoral rival for the next decade. He stayed with the PML-N during the Musharraf years, and by 2004 was a member of its central executive council.

=== District Nazim of Haripur, 2005–2010 ===
In the 2005 local government elections he stood as the PML-N candidate for District Nazim of Haripur. He was backed by PML-N provincial president Pir Sabir Shah and, despite reported pressure from the ruling PML-Q leadership, by his uncle Gohar Ayub Khan and his cousin Omar Ayub Khan, who was then Minister of State for Finance. His main opponent was Raja Amer Zaman, son of former federal minister Raja Sikander Zaman. He won the indirect election of 6 October 2005 by a margin of five votes and took the oath of office on 17 October 2005. He said his priorities would be basic health care, drinking water and roads in a district that largely lacked them. As nazim he repeatedly clashed with provincial governments over funds and the powers of district governments. In July 2006 he said Musharraf had failed to deliver on devolution of power and that he and other nazims would ask the Peshawar High Court to interpret the local government law. In November 2008 he was one of four district nazims who petitioned the court against the ANP–PPP government's revival of divisional commissioners and its ordinances curtailing district governments; the court admitted the petition in February 2009. As president of the NWFP Local Councils Association he also challenged the executive-magistracy provisions of the Shariah Nizam-e-Adl Regulation, 2009; in 2015 the High Court struck down several of those provisions as unconstitutional. Elected local governments in the province completed their term in December 2009 and were dissolved on 20 February 2010. Among his supporters he became known as Baba-e-Baldiyat ("father of local government").

=== Pakistan Tehreek-e-Insaf and the 2013 election ===
Yousuf Ayub Khan later said he left the PML-N because the party supported renaming the province Khyber Pakhtunkhwa; he had been active in the campaign for a separate Hazara province. On 17 December 2011 Imran Khan addressed a public gathering at his residence in Haripur, at which he formally announced that he was joining Pakistan Tehreek-e-Insaf with his supporters. Before the 2013 general election, the returning officer for PK-50 (Haripur-II) rejected his nomination papers after an objection about his educational qualifications. The objection noted that he had declared a Bachelor of Arts degree when contesting in 2002 but declared his education only up to intermediate level in 2013. He initially said he would not challenge the decision and asked his supporters to back his brother Arshad Ayub Khan as a covering candidate. He later appealed, and the election appellate tribunal of the Peshawar High Court accepted his appeal and allowed him to contest.

He won PK-50 with 35,117 votes against 32,879 for Qazi Muhammad Asad Khan of the PML-N. On 13 June 2013 he was one of seven PTI members sworn in to the provincial cabinet of Chief Minister Pervez Khattak. He was given the Communication and Works portfolio.

=== Disqualification ===
After the election, Qazi Muhammad Asad Khan challenged the result before an election tribunal in Abbottabad. He argued that Yousuf Ayub Khan had claimed a bachelor's degree in his papers for the 2002 general election and the 2005 local government election, but had listed his qualification as intermediate in 2013. He also said that the University of the Punjab had denied issuing the degree. The university's registrar appeared before the tribunal and produced records showing that the degree was fake. Khan's counsel argued that a graduation degree was no longer required to contest elections, so the objection was irrelevant.

On 27 September 2013 the tribunal, presided over by Ziauddin Khattak, disqualified him under Articles 62 and 63 of the Constitution and ordered a by-election in PK-50. On 13 November 2013 a three-member Supreme Court bench headed by Chief Justice Iftikhar Muhammad Chaudhry dismissed his appeal and upheld the disqualification. He was then removed as minister. His brother Akbar Ayub Khan won the seat for PTI in the by-election of 23 January 2014.

The disqualification was generally treated as a lifetime bar under Article 62(1)(f). His lawyers later argued that it had in fact carried a five-year term under section 100 of the Representation of the People Act, 1976. They said his earlier legal advisers had overlooked this, so he had waited about a decade before seeking office again. In January 2024 the Supreme Court ruled that Article 62(1)(f) does not impose lifetime disqualification, noting that the Elections Act, 2017 as amended in 2023 limits such disqualification to five years.

=== Later political activity ===
In May 2015 PTI chairman Imran Khan dissolved the party's bodies in Khyber Pakhtunkhwa and named Yousuf Ayub Khan provincial organiser ahead of local government elections. He declined the post within a day, citing personal reasons. A PTI leader, Saad Abdullah, said the appointment had probably been a mistake because the Political Parties Order 2002 barred de-seated lawmakers from holding party office. In a 2015 by-election for the Haripur National Assembly seat, he supported the PTI candidate Raja Amer Zaman, while his cousin Omar Ayub Khan, then in the PML-N, backed Babar Nawaz Khan. In the local government elections later that year Dawn described him as PTI's "main pillar" in Haripur; the party won most tehsil and village council seats in the district but did poorly in the city.

Khan with PTI chairman Imran Khan in Haripur, 2017

Dawn reported in 2024 that, despite his disqualification, he had stayed in contact with voters and campaigned for his brothers and cousin in the 2018 election. According to local observers, he also exercised considerable informal influence over development schemes in Haripur. In August 2020 a district forest officer complained to police that he had attacked him during a dispute over forest land claimed for a road scheme near Budhar; Yousuf Ayub Khan accused the officer of misbehaviour, and the dispute was settled through a compromise at the deputy commissioner's office. In July 2022 he led villagers protesting against forest department eviction notices.

Before the February 2024 general election, he filed nomination papers for NA-18 (Haripur) and PK-46 (Haripur-I) as a covering candidate for Omar Ayub Khan and Akbar Ayub Khan. Rival candidates objected that he was disqualified for life and that he had not declared employment with a company in the United Arab Emirates; his lawyers disputed the employment documents as unattested photocopies. The returning officers rejected the objections, and an election appellate tribunal upheld their decisions. In the end Omar Ayub Khan and Akbar Ayub Khan contested the two seats, and Yousuf Ayub Khan ran their campaigns and that of Arshad Ayub Khan in PK-47, addressing joint public meetings on their behalf while Omar Ayub Khan was in hiding.

Khan with his brothers Akbar and Arshad Ayub Khan, 2024

On 2 February 2024 police detained him near the Hazara Motorway as he returned from a campaign meeting in Khanpur. He was held under the Maintenance of Public Order Ordinance, which his grandfather's government had promulgated in 1960. Police said the detention related to "provocative language" used at campaign meetings. He was already on bail in two cases connected with the 9 May 2023 protests. A two-member bench of the Peshawar High Court suspended the 30-day detention order, ordered his release and granted him interim bail in a separate case. The court also criticised the police for turning a weeks-old daily diary report into a first information report.

After Omar Ayub Khan was disqualified in August 2025, Yousuf Ayub Khan was discussed as a possible candidate in the NA-18 by-election. The family instead fielded Omar Ayub's wife, Shehrnaz Omar Ayub Khan, who lost to Babar Nawaz Khan of the PML-N on 23 November 2025. Yousuf Ayub Khan accused the Election Commission of Pakistan of bias in its arrangements for the poll, and told a PTI protest in Haripur that the party would prove in court that its mandate had been stolen.

== Other roles ==
In April 2024 the Government of Khyber Pakhtunkhwa nominated him as one of the province's three members of the Pakistan Climate Change Authority.

He is president of the Khyber Pakhtunkhwa chapter of the Pakistan-China Friendship Association. In that role he has hosted Chinese diplomats in Peshawar and spoken about his family's part in Sino-Pakistani relations in the 1960s. In June 2025 he opened the association's event at Khyber Pakhtunkhwa House, Islamabad, marking the 74th anniversary of diplomatic relations between Pakistan and China. In May 2026 he led a delegation of Chinese mining companies that met the Governor of Khyber Pakhtunkhwa, Faisal Karim Kundi.

== Personal life ==
Yousuf Ayub Khan is married to Farzana Yousaf, a member of the Raja family of Khanpur and a cousin of his one-time rival and later party colleague Raja Amer Zaman. His mother died in January 2024.

== Electoral history ==
Year	Office / constituency	Party	Votes	Result
1988	Provincial Assembly, PF-40 (Abbottabad)	Independent	18,324	Won
1993	Provincial Assembly, PF-40 (Haripur)	Independent	22,002	Won
1997	Provincial Assembly, PF-40 (Haripur)	PML-N	24,763	Won
2002	Provincial Assembly, PF-50 (Haripur)	PML-N	16,117	Lost
2005	District Nazim, Haripur (indirect)	PML-N	—	Won (by 5 votes)
2013	Provincial Assembly, PK-50 (Haripur-II)	PTI	35,117	Won (later disqualified)

== See also ==
- Omar Ayub
- Raja Sikander Zaman
- Habibullah Khan Tarin
