= Raja Aamer Zaman =

Pakistani politician

Dr. Raja Amir Zaman
- ڈاکٹر راجہ عامر زمان

Member of the National Assembly of Pakistan
- In office 1 June 2013 – 2015
- Constituency: NA-19 (Haripur)

Personal details
- Party: PTI (2013-present)
- Relations: Faisal Zaman (brother)
- Parent: Raja Sikander Zaman (father)

Raja Amir Zaman (Urdu: راجہ عامر زمان) is a Pakistani politician who had been a member of the National Assembly of Pakistan and remained the mayor of district Haripur. He and his family are entitled as a 'Nawab of Khanpur', because of their roots with royal family of Afghanistan. Currently his son named, Raja Haroon Sikandar is serving as a mayor of Tehsil Khanpur KPK. Raja Amir Zaman is MBBS doctor by profession. He is the son of Late Raja Sikander Zaman who served multiple times as member of parliament, federal minister and as a Chief Minister of Khyber PakhtunKhuwa (KPK). His brother Raja Faisal Zaman was a former minister of the provisional assembly of Khyber Pakhtunkhwa.

== Political career ==
He ran for the seat of the Provincial Assembly of Khyber Pakhtunkhwa as a candidate for Pakistan Muslim League (J) from Constituency PF-39 (Haripur) in the 1993 Pakistani general election but was unsuccessful. He received 23,430 votes and lost the seat to Muhammad Mushtaq Khan.

He ran for the seat of the Provincial Assembly of Khyber Pakhtunkhwa as an independent candidate from Constituency PF-39 (Haripur) in the 1997 Pakistani general election but was unsuccessful. He received 22,185 votes and lost the seat to Muhammad Mushtaq Khan.

He ran for the seat of the National Assembly of Pakistan as an independent candidate from Constituency NA-19 (Haripur) in the 2008 Pakistani general election but was unsuccessful. He received 71,254 votes and lost the seat to Sardar Muhammad Mushtaq Khan.

Zaman was elected to the National Assembly on a ticket of Pakistan Tehreek-e-Insaf (PTI) from Constituency NA-19 (Haripur) in the 2013 Pakistani general election. He received 117,612 votes and defeated Omar Ayub Khan. In 2014, he was de-notified as member of the National Assembly after the constituency election was invalidated due to rigging.
