= Raja Jahandad Khan =

Gakhar chief (died 1906)

Khan Bahadur Raja Jahandad Khan, CIE (1849–1906) was a politician and the chief of the Gakhar tribe in the British Indian Empire. He was granted the title of Khan Bahadur on 24 May 1881 and the Companion of the Order of the Indian Empire (CIE) on 1 January 1904.

== Biography ==
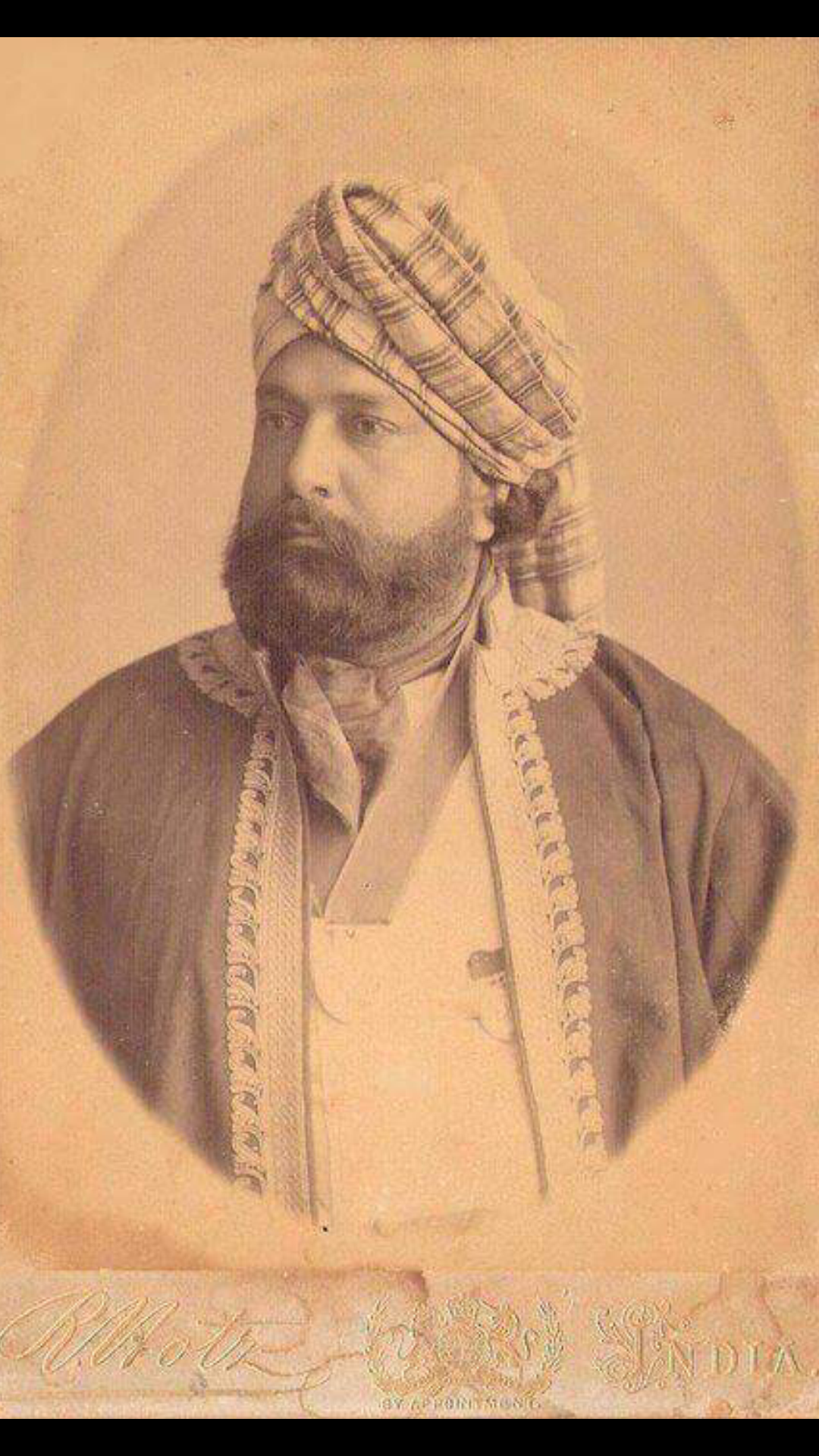
Raja Jahandad Khan in 1890.

Khan was from the Khanpur family of Gakhars. He belonged to the Sarangal clan of the Gakhar tribe. Raja Jahandad inherited the Khanpur estate containing 84 villages from his father Sultan Raja Haider Bukhsh. He was invested with the gold Kaisar-i-Hind Medal by the Viceroy of India, Lord Hardinge, in recognition of the many years of service since 1877 he had so loyally rendered to the British Raj. Raja Jahandad Khan remained Assistant Commissioner of Rawalpindi, Punjab. He was sent as an ambassador of the British Government of India to Afghanistan to congratulate Amir Habibullah Khan on his accession. He had close relations with the Afghan monarchy, and married the daughter of Amir Sher Ali Khan.

== Family ==
Raja Jahandad Khan had three sons — Captain Sultan Raja Haider Zaman (MBE, Delhi Durbar Medal, Delhi Coronation Medal, Chairman District board Hazara); Raja Manochehar Khan (MLA NWFP Assembly 1937) and Raja Safdar Jung. His grandsons Raja Rukan Zaman, Who was appointed as the Chief of Gakhars in 1958 was a member of Legislative Assembly West pakistan and Raja Sikander Zaman who later served as CM of NWFP.

== See also ==
- Sultan Muhammad Khan
