= Rehana, Haripur =

Town in Haripur District, Khyber Pakhtunkhwa, Pakistan

Rehana ریحانہ
- Town and union council
- Interactive map of Rehana
- Coordinates: 33°56′42″N 73°01′31″E
- Country: Pakistan
- Province: Khyber Pakhtunkhwa
- Division: Hazara
- District: Haripur

Population
  - Total: 91,915
- (Population of Haripur per 2023 census)
- Time zone: UTC+5 (PST)

Rehana is a village and one of the 44 union councils, administrative subdivisions, of Haripur District in the Khyber Pakhtunkhwa province of Pakistan.

The largest village in the union council is Rehana village itself, which is renowned for being the birth- and resting place of Sardar Bahadur Khan and Field Marshal Muhammad Ayub Khan, who rose to prominence as a military dictator after his 1958 military coup.

It remains the home village of his family, which includes political figures like Gohar Ayub Khan, Yousuf Ayub Khan, Omar Ayub Khan, Arshad Ayub Khan. The indigenous tribe is Tareen. The word Rehana has etymological origin in Arabic word for 'Flower of Paradise'.
