= Faisal Zaman =

Pakistani politician

Members of Public Safety Commission
- In office 21 November 2016 – 28 May 2018

Member of the Khyber Pakhtunkhwa Assembly
- In office 13 August 2018 – 18 January 2023
- Constituency: PK-42 (Haripur-III)
- In office 31 May 2013 – 28 May 2018
- Constituency: PK-52 (Haripur-IV)

Personal details
- Party: Pakistan Tehreek-e-Insaf Parliamentarians (2023-present)
- Other political affiliations: PTI (2018-2022)
- Occupation: Politician

Faisal Zaman (Urdu: فیصل زمان) is a Pakistani politician hailing from Haripur District, who had been a member of the Khyber Pakhtunkhwa Assembly from August 2018 till January 2023 when he fled the country after escaping from jail. He also served as the chairman and a member of different committees.

== Political career ==
Faisal Zaman was elected as the member of the Khyber Pakhtunkhwa Assembly on ticket of Pakistan Tehreek-e-Insaf from PK-52 (Haripur-IV) in the 2013 Pakistani general election. In 2018, he was expelled from PTI for allegedly selling his vote in the Senate polls.

He ran again for the PK-42 Haripur seat in 2018 General Elections and won as an Independent candidate. In 2021, he was arrested on murder case of Pakistan Tehreek-e-Insaf (PTI) provincial deputy general secretary Malik Tahir Iqbal. In April 2022, he escaped from the MPA hostel which was declared as a sub-jail.
