= Kalinjar, Haripur =

Kalinjar
- Union council
- Interactive map of Kalinjar
- Coordinates: 34°10′0″N 72°53′0″E
- Country: Pakistan
- Province: Khyber Pakhtunkhwa
- District: Haripur

Government
  - Ex Chairman: Muhammad Jaffar , Fawad Ali Shah
  - Ex. District Member: Sheraz Abbasi (PTI)
  - Ex. Tehsile Member: Malik Khanwaiz (PTI)

Population (2018)
  - Total: 18,000
- Postal code: 22810

Kalinjar is one of the 44 union councils, (administrative subdivisions), of Haripur District in the Khyber Pakhtunkhwa province of Pakistan. It is located to the north of the district capital Haripur and borders Mensehra and Abbottabad District area.

== Health ==
Rural Health Center (RHC) which was established in 2002, funded by Save the Children at Swabi Maira Chappar Darband Road Haripur. Basic Health Unit (BHU), Kalinjar and veterinary dispensary Sawabi Mera are also there to help out.

== Education ==
- Govt Tanawal Degree College Gandaf situated at Moon Street Gandaf.(Functional)
- Govt Boys High School Kalinjar
- Govt Girls Higher Secondary School Kalinjar.
- Govt Middle school Swabi Maira.
- Govt Primary School Kalinjar No, 1, 2 and 3.
- Govt. Boys High School Kheri

== Wildlife ==
Game Reserve Kalinjar Contain 2000 ha area, Gray Goral, Black partridge Bird, Gray partridge, See-See partridge, Hare, Fox, Jackal are famous wildlife. Every year more than thousands of migrating birds come into this game Reserve.

== Business ==
Biryani is the most popular and successful business in kalinjar, mostly people engaged with it. They have shops across the Pakistan. There are several names of group like Al Naseeb Biryani, Al Naaz Biryani, Alnoorani Biryani,Student Biryani, Pak Ghazi Biryani, Sabir Biryani etc. Other than that people are mostly daily wagers, do farming, shopkeepers and government servers (mostly Security forces, health department and teaching).

== Problems of UC Kalinjar ==
- Drinking water
- Education
- Health (Staff deficiency)
- Kalinjar to Jam bypass (Under construction)

== Famous and attractive places in U/C Kalinjar ==
- Kani Kot Top
- Tawi Khanpur lake view
- Mari & Swabi Maira Lake View Point
- Chajakka rest house
- Moon Street Gandaf
- Kheri Boys Higher Secondary School
- Kheri Forest " SEHRA" Top

== Village names of Union Council Kalinjar ==
Kalinjar, Sawabi Mera, Gandaf, Marri, Khairi, Tawi Khanpur, Kani Kot, Salabatt, Chajakka, Jam, Muradpur and many more small villages.
