= Ajmal Khan Lahori =

Pakistani Islamic scholar

Khatib-e-Islam Ajmal Khan
- اجمل خان لاہوری

Personal life
- Born: 1930 Kalinjar, Haripur District
- Died: 21 May 2002 (aged 71–72) Lahore
- Resting place: Kalinjar, Haripur District
- Political party: Jamiat Ulema-e-Islam

Religious life
- Religion: Islam
- Founder of: Jamia Rahmania in Gujjar Singh
- Profession: Islamic scholar, Khatib and politician

Ajmal Khan (1930 – 21 May 2002) was a Pakistani Islamic scholar, elocutionist and politician. He was the patron of Jamiat Ulema-e-Islam and the founder of Jamia Rahmania in Gujjar Singh. He was considered as one of the great Khatibs of his time and for this reason he got the title of Khatib-e-Islam (preacher of Islam).

== Early life and education ==
Ajmal Khan was born in 1930 in Kalinjar, a suburban village in Haripur District of NWFP, to a learned family. From beginning to end, he studied Hadith at the Jamia Islamia Rahmania Haripur, Hazara. The education and training of Maulana Khalil-ur-Rehman, the founder and director of Jamia Rahmaniya played a special role in shaping his personality, so after graduating from Dars-i Nizami, he was nominated as a teacher in the same institution.

He was associated with the Jamiat Ulema-e-Islam from the very beginning and was considered a direct follower of Mufti Mahmood. Ajmal Khan remained in Jamiat Ulema-e-Islam all his life, and held various positions, and at the time of his death was the patron saint of Jamiat Ulema-e-Islam.

== Career ==
Khan started his speech in Lahore during the reign of Ahmed Ali Lahori with his full compassion and guidance. He was considered one of the greatest preachers of his time and his title was remembered as the Khatib-e-Islam (preacher of Islam). The title "Khatib-e-Islam" was first used for Thabit bin Qais Ansari who used to attend various meetings as a representative of Muhammad. Since then, many great preachers have been remembered with this title in every era, while Maulana Muhammad Ajmal Khan was the most famous with this title in Pakistan during the last half century.

== Death ==
Khan died on Tuesday, 21 May 2002. After the funeral prayers in Lahore, his body was brought to his native village of Kalinjar. Maulana Fazlur Rehman offered funeral prayers in the presence of thousands of scholars and was buried at Kalinjar in Haripur District.

== See also ==
- List of Deobandis
