= Gohar Ayub Khan =

Pakistani politician (1937–2023)

- گوہر ایوب خان
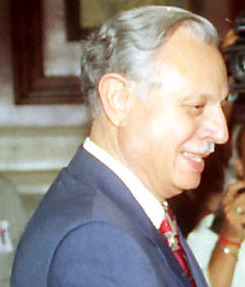
- Khan in 2004

Minister of Foreign Affairs
- In office 25 February 1997 – 7 August 1998
- Prime Minister: Nawaz Sharif
- Preceded by: Sahabzada Yaqub Khan (Acting)
- Succeeded by: Sartaj Aziz

12th Speaker of the National Assembly of Pakistan
- In office 4 November 1990 – 17 October 1993
- Deputy: M. Nawaz Khokhar
- Preceded by: Malik Meraj Khalid
- Succeeded by: Yousaf Raza Gillani

Personal details
- Born: 15 January 1937 Rehana, North-West Frontier Province, British India (now Khyber Pakhtunkhwa, Pakistan)
- Died: 17 November 2023 (aged 86) Islamabad, Pakistan
- Party: Pakistan Muslim League (N) (2012–2018)
- Other political affiliations: Pakistan Peoples Muslim League (2009–2012); Pakistan Muslim League (Q) (1999–2009); Islamic Democratic Alliance (1988–1990); Pakistan Muslim League (F) (1985–1988); Tehrik-e-Istiqlal (1977–1985); Convention Muslim League (before 1977)
- Children: 4, including Omar Ayub Khan
- Parent: Ayub Khan (father)
- Relatives: Mir Dad Khan (grandfather); Sardar Bahadur Khan(uncle); Omar Ayub Khan (son); Yousuf Ayub Khan(nephew); Nusrat Ayub Khan(sister); Arshad Ayub Khan (nephew); Akbar Ayub Khan (nephew)
- Education: Royal Military Academy Sandhurst
- Nickname: Kaptaan

Military service
- Allegiance: Pakistan
- Branch/service: Pakistan Army
- Years of service: (1957–1962; 1971–1972)
- Rank: Captain
- Unit: 1/14 Punjab
- Battles/wars: Indo-Pakistan War of 1971

Gohar Ayub Khan (Urdu: گوہر ایوب خان; 15 January 1937 – 17 November 2023) was a Pakistani politician, businessman, army officer, and a leader of the Pakistan Muslim League (N), who held ministerial positions during the administration of prime minister Nawaz Sharif.

== Early life and military career ==
Gohar Ayub Khan hailed from the village of Rehana, located in the Haripur District of Khyber Pakhtunkhwa province and belonged to the Tareen tribe of ethnic Pashtuns. He was fluent in Hindko and Pashto. He was the son of military dictator former president and field marshal, Ayub Khan, and played an influential role in sustaining his father's presidential rule after the 1965 presidential election. Educated at the Royal Military Academy Sandhurst, Gohar Ayub Khan was commissioned in the Pakistan Army in 1959. During his military service, he served as his father's aide-de-camp, travelling with him on several foreign trips. Upon his resignation in 1962 with the rank of captain, he established a business conglomerate and entered politics in 1974.

Khan contested the 1977 general election through the Tehrik-e-Istiqlal platform and joined the Islamic Democratic Alliance (IDA) in 1988. After the 1990 general election, he was appointed the 14th Speaker of the National Assembly of Pakistan. He became the 20th Minister of Foreign Affairs after securing his seat with a heavy margin in the 1997 general election. Later he shifted to the energy department, serving as Minister for Water and Power beginning 7 August 1998. His term was abruptly ended after the 1999 Pakistani coup d'état by General Pervez Musharraf, and he subsequently retired from national politics.

Gohar Ayub Khan was born on 15 January 1937, in the village of Rehana, in Haripur District during the British Raj in the North-West Frontier Province into a Pashtun military family. A native Hindko speaker, Gohar Ayub belonged to the Tareen tribe of Pashtuns. His father, Ayub Khan, was a senior commanding officer in the British Army and later ascended to staff and field operational assignments in the Pakistan Army. Ayub Khan subsequently became President of Pakistan through a bloodless military coup that commenced in 1958.

Gohar Ayub was sent to study at the military-controlled Army Burn Hall College and eventually moved on to attend Saint Mary's Academy, a private school in Rawalpindi. Gohar Ayub joined the Pakistan Army in 1957, and trained at the Royal Military Academy Sandhurst in the United Kingdom. Upon his return from the UK, he began active duty with the Pakistan Army and started to serve on staff appointments. In 1958, he began to serve as his father's aide-de-camp, travelling with him on several foreign trips in Europe, the Americas, the Soviet Union, and Asia. He did not rise beyond the rank of Captain during his time in the army, despite his father's support. In his army records, there are allegations of professional and behavioural misconduct.

Gohar Ayub was prematurely given retirement in 1962 by the Army's Promotion Branch, despite his father's efforts to stop the investigations against his son. After his early retirement, he and his father-in-law, General (retired) Habibullah Khan established a private industrial firm, the Universal Insurance Co. Ltd.

During the 1971 War, Gohar Ayub briefly returned to active service, seeing action in the Punjab border areas.

== Political career ==
=== Role in the 1965 presidential election ===
Gohar Ayub reportedly played an influential, but controversial, role in Karachi after his father's election in the allegedly rigged 1965 presidential election against Fatima Jinnah. This move led to fierce clashes between rival political groups. Gohar Ayub also faced criticism during that time on questions of family corruption and cronyism through his business links with his father-in-law.

=== Speaker of the National Assembly ===
Gohar Ayub had been a long-standing member of the Pakistan Muslim League and was elected five times to the National Assembly from his home constituency. He first successfully contested a presidential election in March 1965 on a Muslim League platform. In 1977, he contested the National Assembly seat from Peshawar Jail and was elected on the ticket of Asghar Khan's Independence Movement party, defeating the candidate Akhtar Nawaz Khan of the Pakistan People's Party.

After successfully contesting the 1990 general election, Ayub Khan was appointed the 14th Speaker of the National Assembly of Pakistan on 4 November 1990, remaining until 1993. He was succeeded by Yousaf Raza Gillani (later Prime minister) after the 1993 general election. Gohar Ayub also served as senior vice president of the Pakistan Muslim League from 1990 to 1993. After his re-election in 1993, Gohar Ayub became deputy leader of the opposition in the National Assembly.

=== Foreign affairs and water and power ministry under Nawaz Sharif ===
After securing a heavy mandate from his constituency, Gohar Ayub was appointed as the 20th Minister of Foreign Affairs in 1997 by Prime Minister Nawaz Sharif. Gohar Ayub publicly backed Prime Minister Sharif in authorising a nuclear testing programme in response to India's nuclear test in May 1998. Although the prime minister was much more subdued, Gohar Ayub reportedly issued hostile statements and began to call for atomic tests in response to India. He prematurely issued media reports to the media, which reportedly displeased the prime minister.

On 7 August 1998, Gohar Ayub was replaced by economic minister Sartaj Aziz (who put forth efforts to make peace between India and Pakistan), and was reassigned as Minister for Water and Power, a position he filled until he was ousted and forced to resign on 12 October 1999 as a result of a military coup commenced by General Pervez Musharraf.

=== Parting ways with Nawaz Sharif ===
Gohar Ayub's relationship with Nawaz Sharif eventually became strained, causing the former to leave the Pakistan Muslim League in 1999. Gohar Ayub defected to the Pakistan Muslim League's splinter group in 2001. He was appointed the first secretary general of the party. Unable to contest the 2002 election because of a graduation degree restriction introduced by Pervez Musharraf, Gohar Ayub instead endorsed and provide vital support to his family. His younger son, Omar Ayub Khan, won his Haripur District seat, while his wife Zeb Gohar Ayub was elected MNA on the reserved women seats. Gohar Ayub's strongest political opponent in his constituency was former chief minister Raja Sikander Zaman. Once Nawaz Sharif preferred to leave country after signing an accord with General Musharaf, Gohar Ayub Khan left his party PMLN.

=== Post-retirement and controversies ===
After his retirement from national politics in 2002, Gohar Ayub wrote Glimpses into the Corridors of Power and published his father's diary.

He opposed the proposal to rename the NWFP to Khyber-Pakhtunkhwa, while supporting the creation of a separate Hazara province.

=== Reconciliation with Nawaz Sharif ===
After spending few years with the Pakistan Muslim League (Q) during the 2000s, he eventually rejoined PML-N in December 2012, following his reconciliation with Nawaz Sharif.

== Business career ==
Gohar Ayub Khan co-established an industrial firm under the business umbrella of Universal Insurance company Limited, founded by his father-in-law Habibullah Khan Khattak. During a short span of time, Ayub Khan intensified pro-Western and pro-Capitalism policies, and Gohar Ayub emerged as a powerful businessman. There was no evidence that suggests Gohar Ayub secured all these positions with the consent of his father. In 1969, a Western commentator estimated Gohar Ayub's wealth at $4 million, while his family's wealth was put in the range of $10–20 million.

Gohar Ayub served as the Chief Executive of Universal Insurance and was on the board of several other companies in his in-laws, Khan Khattak family's corporation the Bibojee Group.

== Death ==
Gohar Ayub Khan died at Kulsum International Hospital in Islamabad, Pakistan on 17 November 2023, at the age of 86 following a brief illness. He was buried in Rehana, Khyber Pakhtunkhwa, his native village where most of his ancestors are already buried.

He left four children behind, two daughters and two sons, including politician Omar Ayub Khan.

== Books ==
- Glimpses Into the Corridors of Power, Karachi: Oxford University Press, 2007, 354 p. Autobiography.
- Testing Times as Foreign Minister, Islamabad: Dost Publications, 2009, 352 p. Autobiography.
- Shikar: In The Days Gone By, Islamabad: Dost Publications, 2009, 148 p. On hunting.
- Aivān-i Iqtidār Ke Mushāhidāt, Lahore: Sang-e-Mil Publications, 2018, 364 p. Autobiography.

== See also ==
- Omar Ayub Khan (son)
- Iskander Mirza

Political offices
Preceded by Malik Meraj Khalid	Speaker of the National Assembly of Pakistan; 1990–1993	Succeeded by Yousaf Raza Gillani
Preceded by Sahabzada Yaqub Khan; Acting	Minister of Foreign Affairs (Pakistan); 1997–1998	Succeeded by Sartaj Aziz
