= Hattar Industrial Estate =

- Industrial park
- Location in Pakistan Hattar Industrial Estate (Pakistan)
- Coordinates: 33°54′N 72°51′E
- Country: Pakistan
- Province: Khyber Pakhtunkhwa
- District: Haripur
- Established: 2014

Government
  - Type: Managed by Khyber Pakhtunkhwa Department of Industries
- Time zone: PST
- Size: 1443 acres
- Website: https://hattarassociation.com/

The Hattar Industrial Estate (Urdu: حطار انڈسٹریل اسٹیٹ, abbreviated HIE), is an industrial region in Haripur District of Pakistan. It is one of the biggest economic projects of the country's Khyber Pakhtunkhwa province.

== History ==
Hattar Industrial Estate was established between 1985 and 1986 by the Government of Pakistan in order to promote industrialization and create employment opportunities in the region.

The project initiation took place in November 2015 by the Khyber Pakhtunkhwa Economic Zone Development and Management Company. At the time, it was expected to generate PKR 15 billion worth capital investments and provide job opportunities to 200,000 people.

In 2016, HIE was legally declared as a Special Economic Zone by the Board of Investment which gave various industrial companies a ten-year income-tax holiday amongst other duty-free obligations.

== Facilities ==
The Industrial Park is connected to a road network making transport of goods efficient. Furthermore, it is connected to the nearby Hazara Motorway. The Industrial zone also has its own power grid to provide un-interrupted power supply to manufacturing sites.

== Industries ==
- Heavy Electrical Complex
- Ghani Chemical Industries
- Ali Steel Industries
- Farhad Enterprises
- Qarshi Industries
- Raaz Food Industries

== Criticism ==
Areas around the Industrial zone, particularly the Hattar Village and other small villages within a 15 km radius of the large industrial complex have been reportedly heavily affected by air and water pollution resulting from unchecked flushing of untreated chemical-laden liquid and solid waste in open sewage lines with many people suffering from various air and water borne diseases.

== See also ==
- Goleniów Industrial Park
- Kiryat Eliezer Kaplan Industrial Zone
- Shahak Industrial Park
