= Anisa Zeb Tahirkheli =

Pakistani politician

MPA Anisa Zeb Tahirkheli

Member of the Provincial Assembly of Khyber Pakhtunkhwa
- Incumbent
- Assumed office 31 May 2013
- Constituency: WR-18

Personal details
- Party: Qaumi Watan Party
- Occupation: Politician

Anisa Zeb Tahirkheli is a Pakistani woman politician hailing from Haripur District. She is currently serving as member of the Khyber Pakhtunkhwa Assembly belong to the Qaumi Watan Party.

== Education ==
Zeb got her degrees of BSc (Hons) in LLB and MSc in geology.
