= Arshad Ayub Khan =

Pakistani politician from Haripur

- ارشد ایوب خان
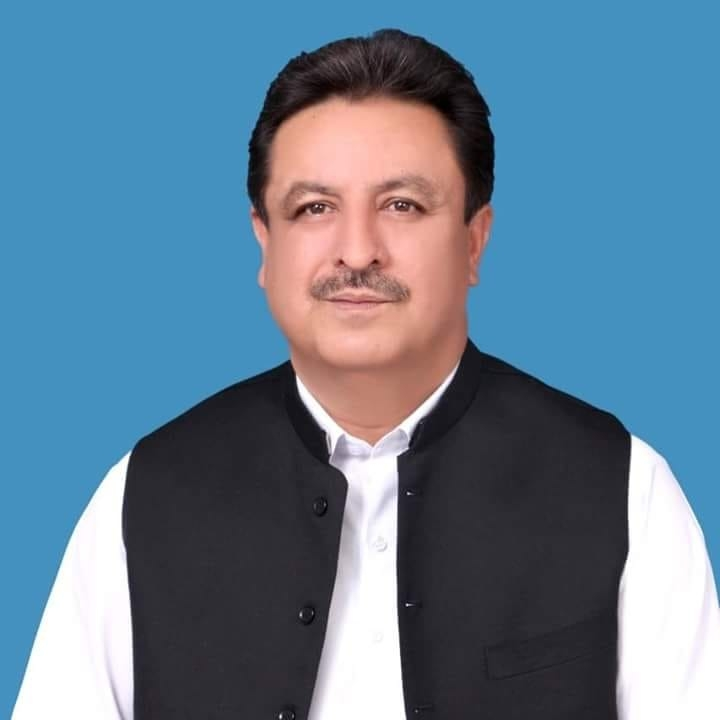

Khyber Pakhtunkhwa Minister for Elementary and Secondary Education
- In office 31 October 2025 – 11 October 2026 (Note: The provincial government and assembly were suspended when governor's rule was imposed on 11 October 2026; an adviser to the governor took charge of education.)
- Chief Minister: Sohail Afridi
- Preceded by: Faisal Khan Tarakai
- Succeeded by: Syed Amir Abdullah (as adviser to the governor)

Khyber Pakhtunkhwa Minister for Local Government, Elections and Rural Development
- In office 7 March 2024 – October 2025
- Chief Minister: Ali Amin Gandapur
- Succeeded by: Meena Khan

Khyber Pakhtunkhwa Minister for Irrigation
- In office 29 November 2021 (Note: Appointed a minister without portfolio on 1 November 2021; given the irrigation portfolio on 29 November 2021.) – 18 January 2023
- Chief Minister: Mahmood Khan

Member of the Provincial Assembly of Khyber Pakhtunkhwa
- Incumbent
- Assumed office 28 February 2024
- Constituency: PK-47 Haripur-II
- In office 13 August 2018 – 18 January 2023
- Constituency: PK-41 Haripur-II

Chairman of the District Development Advisory Committee, Haripur
- In office c. 2019–2021

Personal details
- Party: Pakistan Tehreek-e-Insaf (Note: Following the Supreme Court's reserved-seats judgment of July 2024, the Election Commission notified him on 29 July 2024 as having been returned as a PTI candidate. That notification was withdrawn after the review judgment of June 2025, and the Commission's party-position list of October 2025 and the assembly's records show him as an independent.)
- Other political affiliations: Pakistan Muslim League (N) (2007); Independent (2008)
- Parent: Shaukat Ayub Khan (father)
- Relatives: Ayub Khan (grandfather); Gohar Ayub Khan (uncle); Yousuf Ayub Khan (brother); Akbar Ayub Khan (brother); Omar Ayub Khan (cousin)
- Alma mater: Army Burn Hall College; Concord College; United States International University (BA)

Arshad Ayub Khan (Urdu: ارشد ایوب خان) is a Pakistani politician from Haripur District, Khyber Pakhtunkhwa, who has represented the Haripur-II constituency in the Provincial Assembly of Khyber Pakhtunkhwa since 2018. A grandson of President Ayub Khan and a member of the Tareen family of Rehana, he is the brother of the former provincial ministers Yousuf Ayub Khan and Akbar Ayub Khan and a first cousin of Omar Ayub Khan.

After an unsuccessful run for the provincial assembly in 2008, he was elected for Pakistan Tehreek-e-Insaf (PTI) from PK-41 Haripur-II in 2018 and was re-elected as a PTI-backed independent from PK-47 Haripur-II in 2024. He has served in three provincial cabinets: as minister for irrigation under Mahmood Khan (2021–2023), minister for local government, elections and rural development under Ali Amin Gandapur (2024–2025), and minister for elementary and secondary education under Sohail Afridi (2025–2026), until the provincial government was suspended by the imposition of governor's rule in October 2026.

== Early life and family ==
Arshad Ayub Khan is a son of Shaukat Ayub Khan and a grandson of Field Marshal Ayub Khan, who was President of Pakistan from 1958 to 1969. The family belongs to the Tareen clan of Haripur and is known locally as the "Tareens of Rehana", after its ancestral village of Rehana, which he gives as his address in election records. His uncle Gohar Ayub Khan, a former Speaker of the National Assembly and foreign minister, was buried in the family graveyard at Rehana in November 2023.

He is the younger brother of Yousuf Ayub Khan, a former provincial minister and district nazim of Haripur, and the brother of Akbar Ayub Khan, who has represented Haripur in the provincial assembly since 2014. Gohar Ayub's son, Omar Ayub Khan, a former federal minister and PTI secretary-general, is his first cousin. Dawn has noted that the family's affiliation with the PTI dates only from 2013, and that it had previously been criticised for "fickle political loyalties", but that it stood by Imran Khan after 2023. Several other Tareen politicians from Haripur, including relatives of the former assembly speaker Habibullah Khan Tareen, have contested elections against members of the Ayub family.

== Political career ==
=== Early political career (2002–2013) ===
In the 2002 general election, Arshad Ayub's nomination papers for the provincial seat PF-50 (Haripur-II) were filed and accepted alongside those of his brother Yousuf, the Pakistan Muslim League (N) candidate, who lost the seat to Qazi Muhammad Asad of the PML-Q.

In late 2007 he was named as the PML-N candidate for PF-50 for the 2008 election, in what Dawn described as a three-way contest with Qazi Asad and Dr Faiza Rasheed of the Pakistan Peoples Party; local PML-N office-bearers loyal to the Ayub family had blocked Qazi Asad's bid for the party ticket. By January 2008 he was listed as an independent. He finished second with 21,207 votes, 3,850 behind Qazi Asad, who also ran as an independent and later joined the Awami National Party and served as a provincial minister.

Before the 2013 election, the returning officer rejected Yousuf's nomination papers for PK-50 over contradictory statements about his educational qualifications. Yousuf, by then a PTI candidate, asked his supporters to back Arshad as a "covering candidate"; the PTI's district president said no decision had been made, and a rival PTI aspirant argued that Arshad had not applied for the ticket before the deadline. An appellate tribunal of the Peshawar High Court then allowed Yousuf to contest, and he won the seat; he was disqualified later that year over a fake degree, and Akbar Ayub won the resulting by-election in January 2014.

=== First term (2018–2023) ===
==== 2018 election ====
Ahead of the 2018 general election, Arshad Ayub was one of three main aspirants for the PTI ticket in the newly delimited PK-41 (Haripur-II). A rival aspirant, Chaudhry Abid Mukhtar, claimed that Arshad "did not know the names of villages" in the constituency and warned against giving three tickets to one family. The party nevertheless nominated Arshad for PK-41, Akbar for PK-40 and Omar for NA-17, despite having said that it would award no more than one ticket per family; Dawn reported that the decision further divided the party in Haripur. His principal opponent was Raja Faisal Zaman of the PML-N, from the Raja family of Khanpur.

He won the seat on 25 July 2018 with 56,421 votes to Zaman's 39,362, a margin of 17,059, on a turnout reported at 56.8 per cent in unofficial results. He was notified as the returned candidate on 7 August and took the oath at the assembly's inaugural sitting on 13 August 2018, alongside his brother Akbar.

==== Chairman of the Haripur DDAC ====
By March 2019 Arshad Ayub was chairman of the District Development Advisory Committee (DDAC) for Haripur. In February 2019 he attended a meeting at which Chief Minister Mahmood Khan approved a list of Haripur projects presented by Omar Ayub, including a medical college, the upgrading of the district headquarters hospital and a development authority for Makhnial in upper Khanpur, to be funded from the province's hydel profits. As DDAC chairman he attended the opening of the Haripur trauma centre, which had been delayed by more than three years, and of the Jashn-i-Hazara festival in April 2019.

In 2020 a road he had secured funds for, from Budhar to Danna Ferozpur in Jabri union council, was held up when the forest department refused a no-objection certificate, claiming part of the route as forest land. The district forest officer accused the MPA and his brother of reluctance to include the forest land in the project, while residents said it was common village land; the dispute was settled by a revenue department demarcation in August 2020. The following month the provincial government ordered the demarcation of the Makhinal Guzara forests after illegal construction in the area; Arshad told Dawn that the forest limits had not been marked since 1872 and that he had raised the matter with the chief minister a year earlier.

In June 2021 he announced the chief minister's visit to Haripur to inaugurate projects including the Haripur Bypass and the Shah Maqsood–Kohala Bala–Pir Sohawa road, and with his brothers and Omar Ayub called on Prime Minister Imran Khan to discuss Haripur's development, including proposals for a digital city and low-cost housing. In July 2021 the Speaker appointed him to the assembly's Committee on Petitions.

==== Minister for Irrigation (2021–2023) ====
On 1 November 2021 the governor, on Mahmood Khan's advice, appointed Arshad Ayub and Kamran Bangash provincial ministers, bringing the cabinet to its constitutional limit of 15. Dawn described him as "a PTI lawmaker from the influential Ayub family of Haripur"; his brother Akbar had left the cabinet in August after citing illness. On 29 November he was given the irrigation portfolio.

His first months in office were taken up with the department's annual canal-cleaning and de-silting campaign, for which he ordered inspection committees, weekly progress reviews and action against negligent officials; and with the remodelling of the Warsak Canal and the extension of the Pehur High Level Canal. In February 2022 he announced 59 irrigation projects worth Rs44 billion in the merged tribal districts, including the Jabba and Bara dams, 200 check dams and 475 solar-powered tube wells. At the same press conference he dismissed renewed talk of the Kalabagh Dam as a disputed project rejected by three provinces, and said that the design of the Chashma Right Bank Canal lift scheme would be completed by March, with Khyber Pakhtunkhwa to fund 65 per cent of construction. In April 2022 he visited the Rs2.8 billion Siran Right Bank Canal project in Mansehra, intended to irrigate about 11,872 acres.

The floods of August 2022 badly damaged the province's irrigation network. On 29 August he inspected the Munda Headworks on the Swat River in Charsadda, part of which had collapsed under a flow of more than 260,000 cusecs against a design capacity of 225,000. A month later, as farmers in Shabqadar besieged the Charsadda irrigation office over the slow pace of repairs, he ordered the restoration completed within 15 days so that water would be available for wheat sowing; a temporary embankment restored supply in early October, and he ordered planning for a permanent reconstruction. He also pressed for the recovery of arrears of abiana (water charges).

In Hazara, he oversaw the creation of a separate Hazara Irrigation Circle, notified in December 2022 with a new irrigation division and two subdivisions in Haripur, and laid the foundation stone of a Rs163 million check dam on the Daur River at Sera-i-Saleh. One of his last acts as minister, on 17 January 2023, was to inaugurate the Kotkay small dam and hydropower project in Mansehra, where he predicted that the PTI would return to power after the "imminent" dissolution of the assembly. (Note: Dawn put the cost of the Kotkay project at over Rs2 billion; the Associated Press of Pakistan gave Rs1.84 billion and an output of 1.6 MW.) The next day the governor dissolved the assembly and the cabinet on the chief minister's advice, as part of the PTI's push for early elections.

While a minister he also took part in PTI street protests: after the November 2022 attempt on Imran Khan's life, he, Akbar and Yousuf led workers who blocked the GT Road in Haripur.

=== Out of office (2023–2024) ===
During the crackdown on the PTI that followed the 9 May 2023 unrest, police raided the Haripur homes of Arshad Ayub, his brothers and Omar Ayub in June 2023; Omar said the raids were carried out without search warrants, and none of the brothers were at home. In February 2024 Yousuf's lawyers told the Peshawar High Court that the three brothers had been "continuously harassed" and their homes subjected to "unwarranted raids" because of their PTI affiliation.

=== Second term (2024–present) ===
==== 2024 election ====
He filed nomination papers for PK-47 (Haripur-II) in December 2023. Because the PTI had lost its election symbol, he contested as a PTI-backed independent, while Omar Ayub, who was in hiding and facing charges arising from 9 May, ran for the National Assembly from NA-18. Dawn judged that the Rajgans of Khanpur, who had allied with the former MNA Sardar Mushtaq Khan and the PML-N's Babar Nawaz Khan behind Raja Faisal Zaman, were a stronger challenge than before, while the Tareens were relying on the PTI's popularity and on development schemes "worth billions of rupees". On 2 February 2024 police arrested Yousuf, who was running the brothers' campaigns, under the Maintenance of Public Order law as he returned from one of Arshad's rallies in Khanpur; the high court suspended the detention order on the eve of the poll.

He won the seat on 8 February 2024 with 73,113 votes to Zaman's 34,654, according to the Election Commission's final notification, and was notified as the returned candidate on 18 February. Zaman and the losing candidates in the neighbouring PK-46 and PK-48 petitioned for recounts, alleging that their agents had been denied result forms and that turnout had been inflated; the Election Commission dismissed the petitions in August 2025, noting that the PK-47 margin far exceeded the legal threshold for a recount.

After the election, Dawn reported that he and Akbar were under consideration for chief minister, being "senior party leaders" among a relatively inexperienced group of PTI-backed members; the party chose Ali Amin Gandapur. Like other PTI-backed members he joined the Sunni Ittehad Council in a bid to secure reserved seats, and took the oath on 28 February 2024.

==== Minister for Local Government (2024–2025) ====
Arshad Ayub was sworn in on 6 March 2024 as one of the 15 ministers in Gandapur's cabinet, and the next day was given the portfolio of local government, elections and rural development, a post Akbar had held until August 2021.

His early meetings focused on the finances of the province's tehsil municipal administrations (TMAs), which he told to become financially self-sufficient rather than depend on provincial grants; he ordered biometric attendance and fuel tracking in TMA vehicles, the recovery of official vehicles held by ineligible officers in Peshawar, and performance-based postings. To raise revenue from local government property, his department drafted the Khyber Pakhtunkhwa Local Governments (Property Lease) Rules, 2024, which proposed leases of up to 66 years, extendable by 33 years, for investments above Rs500 million, and he ordered that TMA properties be rented at market rates. He oversaw the province's urban water and sanitation companies, including their Eid al-Adha cleanliness operations in 2024 and 2025, and the Asian Development Bank-funded Khyber Pakhtunkhwa Cities Improvement Project in Peshawar, Abbottabad, Kohat, Mardan and Mingora. In 2025 he set a June 2026 deadline for a World Bank-supported financial management system for local governments, and after the August 2025 floods he led the provincial review of relief in Hazara, announcing Rs100 million for Mansehra and compensation of Rs2 million for each family that had lost a member.

===== Legislation =====
As minister he introduced the Local Government (Amendment) Bill, 2024, which allowed provincial grants to be counted as local government funds, on 19 July 2024; the Land-Use and Building Control (Amendment) Bill and the District Development Advisory Committee (Amendment) Bill on 21 October 2024; and the Parks and Horticulture Authority Bill, which he piloted to passage on 5 December 2024. The assembly also credits him with moving the Police (Amendment) Bill, 2024. His last bill as local government minister, the Local Government (Amendment) Bill, 2025, deleted a clause of section 25(1) of the Local Government Act, 2013, with the stated aim of "rationalising" the powers of mayors and tehsil chairmen; it was introduced on 15 August and passed on 9 September 2025. Elected local representatives and civil society groups condemned it as an attempt to revive amendments that the Peshawar High Court had struck down in May 2025.

===== Dispute with local governments =====
His tenure was dominated by a dispute with the province's elected mayors and tehsil chairmen, who said they had received none of the 20 per cent share of the provincial development budget reserved for local governments. In May 2024 the government doubled their honoraria and promised legal changes to allow provincial grants to local bodies, but in October Gandapur told a meeting attended by Arshad Ayub that the province could not afford development funds for them. In December 2024 the local councils' association accused the government of releasing funds only to PTI-run councils, and 22 tehsil chairmen challenged the allocation in the high court. After police used tear gas to disperse local representatives blocking the GT Road in Peshawar in January 2025, he was one of four ministers in a jirga that promised to meet their demands within 20 days. When that deadline passed, he persuaded them to postpone further road blockades in February 2025 by promising a meeting with the chief minister, notification of rules of business, a three-year extension of their terms and a first release of Rs2.7 billion.

His tenure ended with the Gandapur government, after Gandapur resigned on 8 October 2025 and the assembly elected Sohail Afridi as chief minister on 13 October.

==== Minister for Elementary and Secondary Education (2025–2026) ====
Arshad Ayub was one of ten ministers sworn into Afridi's 13-member cabinet on 31 October 2025, and was given the elementary and secondary education portfolio; the local government department passed to Meena Khan. The department is the province's largest, with about 245,000 employees.

===== Administration and transfers =====
At his first departmental briefing he said the education secretariat and directorate would go paperless, that free textbooks and bags would be provided in all public schools, and that the existing ban on teacher transfers would remain until an online merit-based system was in place. In January 2026 he suspended the procurement of school bags and stationery pending e-bidding, ordered an electronic pension-processing system and directed district officers to hear public complaints in daily live sessions on Facebook. On 31 March 2026 he launched the "E-Transfer Policy Plus", under which teacher transfers are scored on criteria such as length of service, student–teacher ratios, disability and widowhood and applied for through a mobile app; he called it the end of the "culture of recommendations".

He ordered several inquiries into departmental irregularities. In November 2025 he called for a report on alleged financial irregularities and poor construction in the World Bank-funded Khyber Pakhtunkhwa Human Capital Investment Project; a subsequent inquiry found Rs106 million had been embezzled, and the project director was removed and the case recommended for referral to the National Accountability Bureau and the Federal Investigation Agency. In December 2025 he ordered an inquiry into the Textbook Board's alleged printing of 400,000 surplus textbooks worth Rs130 million, and in January 2026 into alleged negligence in the recruitment of Class-IV staff in Abbottabad.

===== Teachers and curriculum =====
In December 2025 he announced the recruitment of 16,000 teachers at a cost of Rs11 billion, in addition to 6,000 contract teachers, and the separation of the teaching and management cadres. In May 2026 a ministerial committee he chaired agreed in principle to regularise about 14,000 ad hoc teachers, subject to cabinet approval, and in June, during a heated assembly debate on teachers paid below the minimum wage, he said he had no objection to raising their pay and that a summary would be sent to the cabinet. He also backed a proposed teacher licensing regime, saying it should meet international standards.

Following a directive from Chief Minister Afridi in November 2025 to introduce artificial intelligence courses from grade six, he announced in February 2026 that AI classes for grades 6 to 12 would begin on 1 March 2026, subject to cabinet approval, with about 7,000 teachers being recruited for the purpose. Press reports noted that the province lacked 5,525 IT laboratories. In examinations he directed the boards to adopt a uniform policy against cheating and to introduce electronic marking, which was used in the 2026 secondary school examinations.

===== Enrolment and schools =====
On 6 March 2026 he launched the province's enrolment campaign for 2026–27, with a target of 1,328,620 children and the aim of reducing primary dropout from seven to five per cent, and backed the expansion of double-shift schooling to 1,165 schools. At International Literacy Day in September 2026 he said that nearly 4.9 million children in the province were out of school, and called on parents, communities and religious leaders to help. In April 2026 he announced a plan to restore seven long-established public institutions, including Abbottabad Public School, Peshawar Public School, Fazl-e-Haq College in Mardan and Excelsior College in Swat, to their former standing. As chairman of the board of governors of the model schools in the merged districts he directed in September 2026 that they be developed into centres of excellence. The same month, the department closed all public and private schools on Fridays and Saturdays for two months as a fuel-saving measure.

He opened the general debate on the 2026–27 provincial budget on 23 June 2026, and announced that 10,000 new classrooms would be built with support from the Asian Development Bank.

==== Governor's rule (2026) ====
On 11 October 2026 the federal government imposed a state of emergency and governor's rule in Khyber Pakhtunkhwa under Articles 232 and 234 of the Constitution, the fourth such imposition in the province's history, suspending the Afridi government and the provincial assembly. Afridi and some cabinet members were placed in preventive custody. On 13 October Syed Amir Abdullah, the governor's adviser on education, held his first meeting with the department.

== Constituency work in Haripur ==
As irrigation minister he inaugurated several projects in Khanpur tehsil, part of his constituency, including a Rs600 million grid station and a Rescue 1122 centre in September 2022, a water supply scheme and link road in December 2022, and roads, a bridge and flood-protection works in upper Khanpur days before the assembly's dissolution. Dawn later reported that plaques on scores of Haripur projects from this period bore the name of his brother Yousuf, who was disqualified from holding office, alongside those of Arshad, Akbar and Omar, and that observers described Yousuf as a "de facto minister".

As local government minister he visited the site of the Pakistan Digital City project in Haripur with Omar and Akbar Ayub in January 2025, pledging the provincial government's support, accompanied Gandapur when he inaugurated a paramedical school and technology park at Pak-Austria Fachhochschule in Haripur in November 2024, and began the process of bringing Makhniyal and neighbouring villages under the Haripur urban development authority. As education minister he chaired a meeting in December 2025 on spending Haripur's 10 per cent share of the province's net hydel profits, which he said the district had long been denied, designated Government Higher Secondary School No. 1 Haripur a centre of excellence, inspected new classrooms and laboratories at the girls' higher secondary school in Khanpur, and pressed for the completion of a girls' cadet college at Mirpur, Haripur.

=== Local and by-elections ===
In the December 2021 local government elections, Arshad, Akbar and Omar Ayub campaigned for the PTI's candidate for chairman of Haripur tehsil, the former district nazim Akhtar Nawaz Khan, and for its nominee in Khanpur; both lost, an independent winning Haripur and the PML-N winning Khanpur and Ghazi.

After Omar Ayub was disqualified in 2025, the family put forward his wife, Shehrnaz Omar Ayub, for the NA-18 by-election on 23 November 2025, which she lost to the PML-N's Babar Nawaz Khan. Arshad Ayub, then a provincial minister, addressed PTI workers who blocked the GT Road outside Omar's office alleging that the election had been "stolen", and Chief Minister Afridi ordered an inquiry into the role of provincial officials in the poll. In January 2026 he received Afridi in Haripur at the launch of the PTI's street movement for Imran Khan's release.

== Offices held ==
| Office | Term | Chief Minister |
|---|---|---|
| Member, Provincial Assembly (PK-41 Haripur-II) | 13 August 2018 – 18 January 2023 | — |
| Chairman, District Development Advisory Committee, Haripur | c. 2019 – 2021 | Mahmood Khan |
| Provincial Minister (without portfolio) | 1 – 29 November 2021 | Mahmood Khan |
| Provincial Minister for Irrigation | 29 November 2021 – 18 January 2023 | Mahmood Khan |
| Member, Provincial Assembly (PK-47 Haripur-II) | 28 February 2024 – present | — |
| Provincial Minister for Local Government, Elections and Rural Development | 7 March 2024 – October 2025 | Ali Amin Gandapur |
| Provincial Minister for Elementary and Secondary Education | 31 October 2025 – 11 October 2026 | Sohail Afridi |

== Electoral history ==
| Year | Constituency | Party | Votes | % | Result | Runner-up | Margin | Ref. |
|---|---|---|---|---|---|---|---|---|
| 2008 | PF-50 (Haripur-II) | Independent | 21,207 | 36.2 | Lost | Qazi Muhammad Asad Khan (Ind.), 25,057 | −3,850 | |
| 2018 | PK-41 (Haripur-II) | PTI | 56,421 | 47.4 | Won | Raja Faisal Zaman (PML-N), 39,362 | 17,059 | |
| 2024 | PK-47 (Haripur-II) | Independent (PTI-backed) | 73,113 | 59.3 | Won | Raja Faisal Zaman (Ind.), 34,654 | 38,459 | |

Percentages are of valid votes. Turnout was 42.7 per cent in 2008, about 56.8 per cent in 2018 and 52.3 per cent in 2024. Unofficial results reported on election night differed slightly from the final figures. (Note: Unofficial results reported by the Associated Press of Pakistan gave 56,270 to 39,268 in 2018 and 73,038 to 34,620 in 2024.)

== See also ==
- Afridi provincial government
