= Aamna Sardar =

Pakistani politician

Aamna Sardar MPA

Member of the Provincial Assembly of Khyber Pakhtunkhwa
- Incumbent
- Assumed office 31 May 2013
- Constituency: WR-14

Personal details
- Born: Haripur District
- Party: Pakistan Muslim League (N)
- Occupation: Politician

Aamna Sardar (Urdu: آمنہ سردار) is a Pakistani politician. She comes from Haripur District and belongs to Pakistan Muslim League (N) (PML (N)).

She serves as Member of the Provincial Assembly of Khyber Pakhtunkhwa in a seat reserved for a woman. She is a member on the Special Committee on the issue of Business activities in the University Town, Peshawar, Standing Committee No. 25 on Establishment Department, Standing Committee No. 14 on Industries and Technical Education Department, Standing Committee No. 12 on Health Department and Right to Information in the Khyber Pakhtunkhwa Assembly.

Sardar earned the degrees of Bachelor of Arts, Bachelor of Education, and Master of Arts in English.
