= Raja Faisal Zaman =

Pakistani politician

Member of the Provincial Assembly of Khyber Pakhtunkhwa
- In office 2002 – 28 May 2018
- Minister: Youth Affairs, Tourism, Sports, Agricultural
- Constituency: Constituency PK-49 (Haripur-I)

Personal details
- Party: PMLN

Raja Faisal Zaman is a Pakistani politician and the former Minister of Youth Affairs, Tourism, Sports, Agricultural Khyber Pakhtunkhwa Pakistan, He is also the advisor of Metrix Tech Summit Pakistan's biggest technology Summit. He had been a Member of the Provincial Assembly of Khyber Pakhtunkhwa, from 2002 to May 2018. He is the son of Raja Sikander Zaman former chief minister of Khyber Pakhtunkhwa.

== Education ==
He has done Master of Business Administration.

== Political career ==
He was elected to the Provincial Assembly of the North-West Frontier Province as an independent candidate from Constituency PF-49 (Haripur-I) in the 2002 Pakistani general election. He received 30,153 votes and defeated Raja Sheraz Haider, a candidate of Pakistan Muslim League (N) (PML-N).

He was re-elected to the Provincial Assembly of the North-West Frontier Province as a candidate of Muttahida Majlis-e-Amal from Constituency PF-49 (Haripur-I) in the 2008 Pakistani general election. He received 27,654 votes and defeated Raja Sheraz Haider, a candidate of PML-N.

He was re-elected to the Provincial Assembly of Khyber Pakhtunkhwa as a candidate of Pakistan Muslim League (N) (PML-N) from Constituency PK-49 (Haripur-I) in the 2013 Pakistani general election. He received 28,372 votes and defeated an independent candidate, Raja Ejaz Akhter.
