= Jahangir Khanji =

Nawab of Junagadh state (died 2023)

Nawab Muhammad Jahangir Khanji
- Succeeded by: Nawab Ali Murtaza Khanji

Personal details
- Born: 1955/56
- Died: 20 July 2023 (aged 67) Karachi, Sindh, Pakistan
- Cause of death: Cancer
- Known for: Advocating for secession of Junagarh state from India

Muhammad Jahangir Khanji (1955/56 – 20 July 2023) was the claimed Nawab of Junagarh who advocated for Junagarh state's secession from India. His grandfather, Nawab Mahabat Khanji, had previously signed an instrument of accession to Pakistan on 15 September 1947, during his reign as the ruler of Junagarh State.

Khanji died of cancer in Karachi on 20 July 2023, at the age of 67. His funeral took place at Junagarh House on 21 July following the Friday prayers. He left behind his aged mother Shah Begum Sahab Musarrat Jahan Begum, a son, Nawabzada Ali Murtaza Khanji and daughter Nawabzadi Dure Mariam Khanji.
