= Shaukat Ali Yousafzai =

Pakistani politician

KP Minister of Industries
- In office 1 April 2014 – 3 May 2014
- President: Mamnoon Hussain
- Governor: Shaukatullah Khan; Mehtab Ahmed Khan

KP Minister of Health
- In office 31 May 2013 – 31 March 2014
- President: Asif Ali Zardari; Mamnoon Hussain
- Governor: Shaukatullah Khan; Mehtab Ahmed Khan
- Chief Minister: Pervez Khattak
- Preceded by: Syed Zafar Ali Shah
- Succeeded by: Shahram Khan

Member of the Provincial Assembly of Khyber Pakhtunkhwa
- In office 15 October 2018 – 18 January 2023
- Speaker: Mushtaq Ahmad Khan
- Constituency: PK-23 (Shangla-I)
- In office 31 May 2013 – 28 May 2018
- Speaker: Asad Qaiser
- Constituency: PK-21 (Peshawar-II)

Personal details
- Born: 1 February 1963 (age 63) Besham, Shangla District, Khyber Pakhtunkhwa, Pakistan
- Other political affiliations: PTI (1996-present)
- Spouse: 2
- Children: 14
- Education: Aitchison College; Gordon College
- Occupation: Politician
- Chief Minister: Pervez Khattak

Shaukat Ali Yousafzai (born 1 February 1963) is a Pakistani politician who had been a member of the Provincial Assembly of Khyber Pakhtunkhwa from May 2013 till January 2023. He also served as a member of the 10th Provincial Assembly of Khyber Pakhtunkhwa, representing the Pakistan Tehreek-e-Insaf (PTI) and as Minister for Health and Information Khyber Pakhtunkhwa in the Pervez Khattak administration. He also serves as the Secretary General of PTI’s provincial chapter of Khyber Pakhtunkhwa and previously has served as the political advisor to Imran Khan.

== Background ==
Yousafzai is a senior journalist and a senior leader of Pakistan Tehreek-e-Insaf. He remained the president of Khyber Union of Journalist for three times. He is a Chief Editor of Daily Surkhab which is published from Peshawar. He basically belongs to Besham a remote village of District Shangla, and settled in Peshawar since 90s. He is a member and Deputy Parliamentary Leader of Provincial Assembly KP.Currently he is holding no Ministry in Khyber Pukhtunkhwa.

== Education ==
He obtained his early education from Government High School Shang District Shangla and then his Intermediate from Jehanzeb College Swat. He has done MSc from KP Agricultural University Peshawar. He obtained a degree in Journalism from the University of Peshawar.

== Political career ==
Yousafzai remained active in politics during his university and was the President of People Student Federation of KP Agricultural University, Peshawar. He joined Pakistan Tehreek-e-Insaf in 1996 and also contested election from District Shangla. Since from that time, he remained active in politics and given his efforts for establishing PTI in KP. In 2011 he was appointed as Political Advisor to chairman Imran khan. He then resigned from this post to contest intra party election. He was elected as Provincial General Secretary of Pakistan Tehreek-e-Insaf in KP. In the 2013 general elections, he contested for Provincial Assembly seats from PK-2 Peshawar and got a huge victory against Syed Zahir Ali Shah of Pakistan People Party with a margin of 16,000 votes. PTI has assigned Shaukat Ali Yousafzai as Deputy Parliamentary Leader in KP Provincial Assembly. He is also serving as Minister for Health and Information Khyber Pukhtunkhwa. He is the most influential Provincial leader of Khyber Pukhtunkhwa province. He got worldwide recognition following a 14 June 2019 conference when he was accidentally equipped with a cat face filter by a social media team volunteer.
