= NA-18 Haripur =

Constituency of the National Assembly of Pakistan

- Constituency for the National Assembly of Pakistan
- Region: Haripur District
- Electorate: 724,915

Current constituency
- Member: Vacant
- Created from: NA-17 (Haripur)

NA-18 Haripur (این اے-18، ہری پور) is a constituency for the National Assembly of Pakistan. It covers tho whole of district swabi.The constituency was formerly known as NA-19 (swabi) from 1977 to 2018. The name changed to NA-17 (swabi) after the delimitation in 2018 and to NA-18 (swabi) after the delimitation in 2022.

== Members of Parliament ==
=== 1977–2002: NA-19 Haripur ===
Election	Member	Party
1977	Maulana Sadrushaheed	PNA
1985	Maula Dad Khan	Independent
1988	Maulvi Ali Akbar Khan	JUI (F)
1990	Maulvi Ali Akbar Khan	JUI (F)
1993	Syed Abbas Shah	PML-N
1997	Malik Nasir Khan	PML-N

=== 2002–2018: NA-19 Haripur ===
Election	Member	Party
2002	Omar Ayub Khan	PML (Q)
2008	Sardar Muhammad Mushtaq	PML (N)
2013	Raja Aamer Zaman	PTI
2015 By-election	Babar Nawaz Khan	PML (N)

=== 2018–2023: NA-17 Haripur ===
Election	Member	Party
2018	Omar Ayub	PTI

=== 2024–2025: NA-18 Haripur ===
Election	Member	Party
2024	Omar Ayub	SIC

== Detailed Results ==
2025 By-election: NA-18 (Haripur)
Party	Candidate	Votes	%	±%
PML-N	Babar Nawaz Khan	163,996	52.98%	▲20.76
Independent	Shehrnaz Omar Ayub	120,220	38.84%	▼15.55
Independent	Asad Usman	12,723	4.11%	▲4.11
PPP	Iram Fatima	7,147	2.31%	

=== 2002 general election ===
2002 General Election: NA-19 (Haripur)
Party	Candidate	Votes	%	±%
PML-Q	Omar Ayub	81,496	40.79	
PML-N	Syed Muhammad Sabir Shah	61,359	30.71	
MMA	Ghulam Nabi	30,514	15.28	
PPPP	Sardar Abdur Raoof Khan	16,902	8.46	
PML-J	Muhammad Shehryar Khan	5,956	2.98	
PAT	Abdul Hamid Khan	1,978	0.99	
Independent	Syed Waqar Hussain Shah	1,582	0.79	
Majority		20,137	10.08	
Turnout		199,787	45.44	
PML(Q) gain from PML (N)				

A total of 6,277 votes were rejected.

=== 2008 general election ===
2008 General Election: NA-19 (Haripur)
Party	Candidate	Votes	%	±%
PML-N	Sardar Muhammad Mushtaq Khan	98,670	44.35	+13.64
Independent	Raja Aamer Zaman	71,254	32.02	
PML	Omar Ayub	50,631	22.76	
Independent	Syed Waqar Hussain Shah	1,363	0.61	−0.18
Independent	Dr Riaz Baig	580	0.26	
Majority		27,416	12.33	
Turnout		222,498	47.10	+1.66
PML(N) gain from PML (Q)				

A total of 5,757 votes were rejected.

=== 2013 general election ===
2013 General Election: NA-19 (Haripur)
Party	Candidate	Votes	%	±%
PTI	Raja Aamer Zaman	116,979	40.61	
PML-N	Omar Ayub	114,807	39.85	−4.50
JUI-F	Pir Syed Alamzeb Shah	19,860	6.89	
PPPP	Sardar Muhammad Mushtaq Khan	16,474	5.72	
JI	Ghulam Nabi	5,117	1.78	
Tehreek-e-Suba Hazara	Major Rtd Jameel Ehsan Kiyani	3,625	1.26	
Independent	Irum Fatima	3,590	1.25	
Independent	Farooq Shah	3,096	1.07	
Independent	Faiza Bibi Rasheed	2,464	0.86	
Independent	Muhammad Riaz Baig	1,346	0.47	+0.21
MQM	Habibullah Khan	699	0.24	
Majority		2,172	0.76	
Turnout		288,057	55.55	+8.45
PTI gain from PML (N)				

A total of 8,467 votes were rejected.

=== 2015 By-election ===
A by-election took place on 16 August 2015.

2015 By-election: NA-19 (Haripur)
Party	Candidate	Votes	%	±%
PML-N	Babar Nawaz Khan	137,227	58.63	+18.78
PTI	Raja Aamer Zaman	90,702	38.75	−1.86
JUI-F	Pir Syed Aalamzeb Shah	2,473	1.06	−5.83
PPPP	Muhammad Tahir Qureshi	1,396	0.60	−5.12
Independent	Shah Khan	939	0.40	
Independent	Raja Sardar Zaman Hazarvi	583	0.25	
Independent	Safeer Muhammad Gujjar Naqibi	418	0.18	
Independent	Khan Ser	157	0.07	
Independent	Muhammad Aqeel Khan Durrani	153	0.06	
Majority		46,525	19.88	
Turnout		234,048	44.00	−11.55
PML(N) gain from PTI				

A total of 3,918 votes were rejected.

=== 2018 general election ===
General elections were held on 25 July 2018. The constituency got the third-highest total votes polled in all of Pakistan. Omar Ayub Khan of Pakistan Tehreek-e-Insaf won, getting the most votes by any candidate in all of Pakistan.

General election 2018: NA-17 (Haripur)
Party	Candidate	Votes	%	±%
PTI	Omar Ayub	172,609	50.27	▲11.52
PML(N)	Babar Nawaz Khan	132,756	38.66	▼19.97
Others	Others (eleven candidates)	29,014	8.48	
Turnout		343,442	52.22	▲8.22
Rejected ballots		8,862	2.59	
Majority		39,853	11.61	
Registered electors		657,628		
PTI gain from PML(N)				

=== 2024 general election ===
General elections were held on 8 February 2024. Omar Ayub Khan won with 194,429 votes.

General election 2024: NA-18 Haripur
Party	Candidate	Votes	%	±%
Independent	Omar Ayub (Note: Filed nomination papers as PTI candidate but ECP allowed him to run as an Independent)	194,429	55.39	▲5.12
PML(N)	Babar Nawaz Khan	113,079	32.22	▼6.44
TLP	Muhammad Saleh	12,382	3.53	▲0.65
Others	Others (thirteen candidates)	31,100	8.86	
Turnout		362,748	50.04	▼2.18
Rejected ballots		11,758	3.24	
Majority		81,350	23.18	▲11.57
Registered electors		724,915		

=== 2025 By-election ===
A by-election was held on 23 November 2025 due to the disqualification of Omar Ayub Khan, the previous member from this seat.

2025 By-election: NA-18 Haripur
Party	Candidate	Votes	%	±%
PML(N)	Babar Nawaz Khan	163,996	52.99	
Independent	Shehnaz Umar Ayub	120,220	38.84	
Independent	Asad Ashan	12,723	4.11	
Others	Others (six candidates)	12,577	4.06	
Turnout		317,342	42.09	
Rejected ballots		7,826	2.47	
Majority		43,776	14.15	
Registered electors		753,944		

== See also ==
- NA-17 Abbottabad-II
- NA-19 Swabi-I
