= Swabi Maira =

Village in Pakistan

Swabi Maira is a historical village in Haripur District, Pakistan.
