= Khyber Pakhtunkhwa Department of Industries =

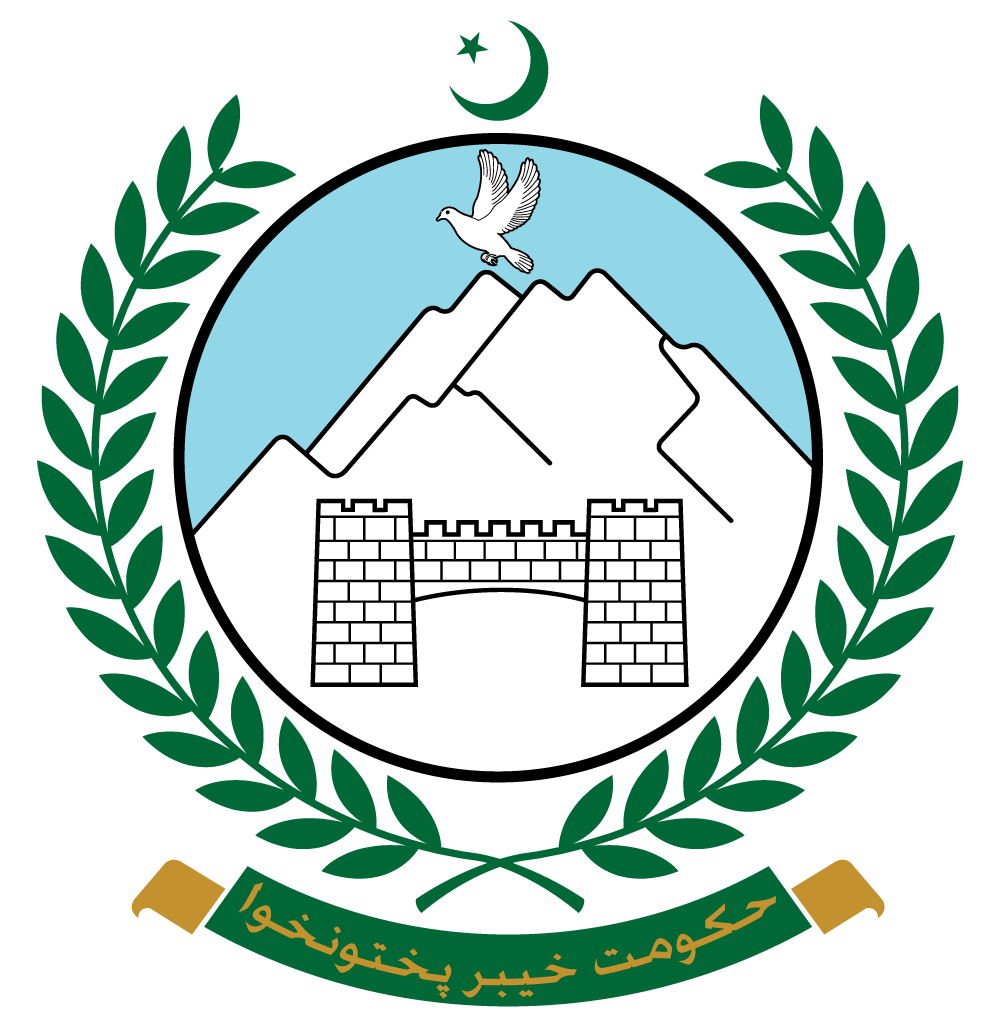
- Khyber Pakhtunkhwa emblem

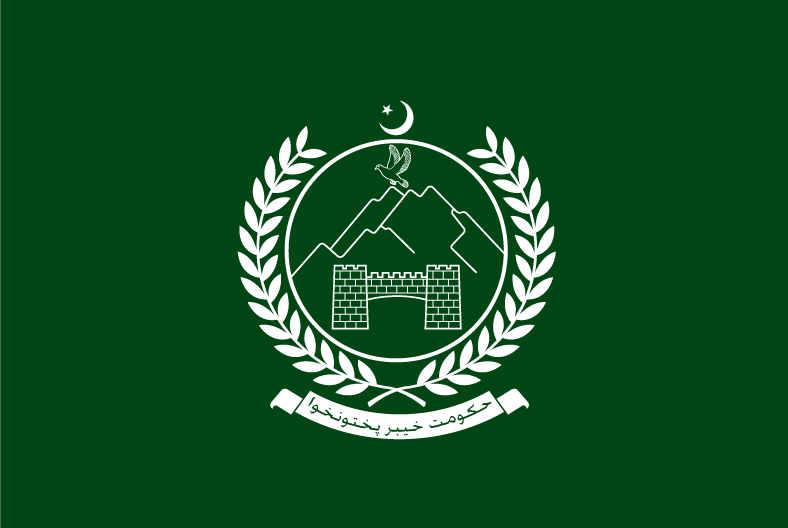
- Khyber Pakhtunkhwa flag

Agency overview
- Formed: August 14, 1973; 52 years ago
- Jurisdiction: Government of Khyber Pakhtunkhwa
- Headquarters: Peshawar; 34°01′N 71°35′E
- Agency executive: Abdul Munim, Assistant to CM; Secretary
- Website: Official Website

The Khyber Pakhtunkhwa Department of Industries (Pashto: د صنايعو رياست خیبر پښتونخو, Urdu: محکمہ صنعت خیبر پښتونخوا) is concerned with industry in the Pakistani province of Khyber Pakhtunkhwa. It is headed by the Khyber Pakhtunkhwa Minister of Industries, who is a member of the Chief Minister's Cabinet. Mr. Shaukat Ali Yousafzai was appointed as Minister of Industries by Chief Minister of KP Pervez Khattak on April 1, 2014.

== History ==
The department was created on August 14, 1973. This department's main purpose is to create jobs, promote Industrial growth, encourage sustainable development and improve standards of living for all citizens of Khyber Pakhtunkhwa. The department is currently headed by Secretary Sajjid Khan.

== Organization ==
The Department is under the control and supervision of a Khyber Pakhtunkhwa Minister of Industries, a political appointee of the Chief Minister of Khyber Pakhtunkhwa. The Industries Minister is assisted in managing the Department by a Secretary of Industries, also appointed by the Chief Minister, who assumes the duties of the Minister in his absence.

=== Structure ===
- Minister of Industries
  - Secretary of Industries

== Duties ==
The duties of the Department are to carry out approved programs and make the public aware of the objectives of the department.

== List of ministers ==
No.	Name	Photo	Term began	Term ended	Governor(s)
1.		Samiullah Khan Alizai	March 24, 2013	May 31, 2013	Shaukatullah Khan
2.		Umar Farooq Khan (caretaker)	March 24, 2013	May 31, 2013	Shaukatullah Khan
3.		Pervez Khattak	June 1, 2013	March 31, 2014	Shaukatullah Khan
4.		Shaukat Ali Yousafzai	April 1, 2014	May 3, 2014	Shaukatullah Khan
4.		Shaukat Ali Yousafzai	April 1, 2014	May 3, 2014	Mehtab Ahmed Khan
5.		Pervez Khattak	May 3, 2014	Incumbent	Mehtab Ahmed Khan
