= Omar Ayub =

Pakistani politician (born 1970)

- عمر ایوب
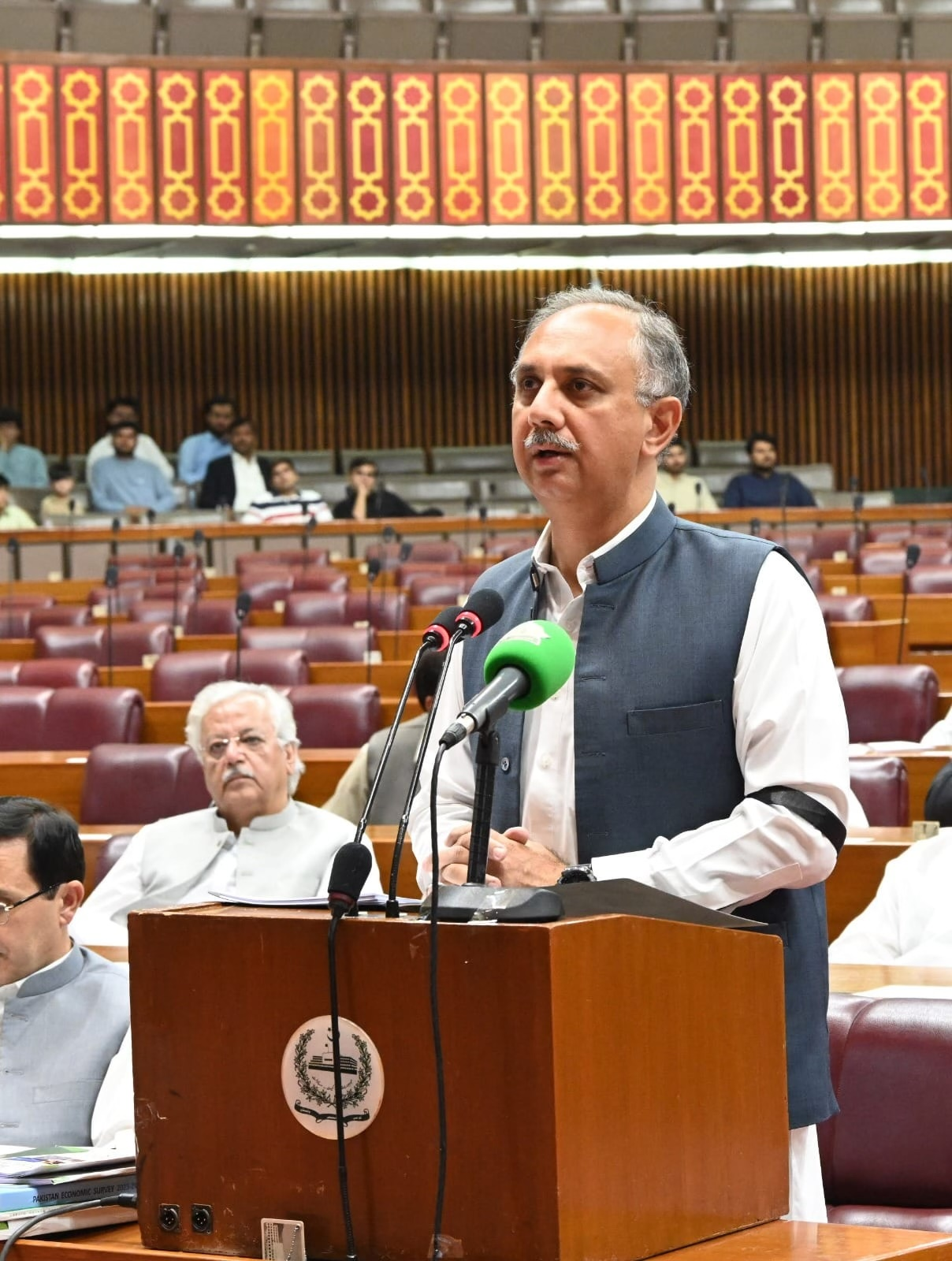
- Ayub in 2024

22nd Leader of the Opposition (Pakistan)
- In office 2 April 2024 – 8 August 2025
- President: Asif Ali Zardari
- Prime Minister: Shehbaz Sharif
- Preceded by: Raja Riaz
- Succeeded by: Mahmood Khan Achakzai

Federal Minister for Economic Affairs
- In office 17 April 2021 – 10 April 2022
- President: Arif Alvi
- Prime Minister: Imran Khan
- Preceded by: Khusro Bakhtiar

Federal Minister for Petroleum
- In office 18 April 2019 – 17 April 2021
- President: Arif Alvi
- Prime Minister: Imran Khan
- Preceded by: Ghulam Sarwar Khan
- Succeeded by: Hammad Azhar

Federal Minister for Power
- In office 11 September 2018 – 17 April 2021
- President: Arif Alvi
- Prime Minister: Imran Khan
- Preceded by: Imran Khan
- Succeeded by: Hammad Azhar

Member of the National Assembly of Pakistan
- In office 29 February 2024 – 5 August 2025
- Succeeded by: Babar Nawaz Khan
- Constituency: NA-18 Haripur
- In office 13 August 2018 – 17 January 2023
- Constituency: NA-17 (Haripur)
- In office January 2014 – June 2015
- Constituency: NA-19 (Haripur)
- In office 2002–2007
- Constituency: NA-19 (Haripur)

Personal details
- Born: 26 January 1970 (age 56) Haripur, Khyber Pakhtunkhwa, Pakistan
- Party: PTI (2018–present)
- Other political affiliations: PMLN (2012–2018); PPML (2009–2012); PML-Q (2001–2009); PMLN (1993–2001)
- Parent: Gohar Ayub Khan (father)
- Relatives: Ayub Khan (grandfather); Yousuf Ayub Khan (cousin); Arshad Ayub Khan (cousin); Akbar Ayub Khan (cousin)

Omar Ayub Khan (Urdu: عمر ایوب خان; born 26 January 1970) is a Pakistani politician who previously served as the Leader of the Opposition from April 2024 to August 2025. He was the last federal minister for economic affairs under the premiership of Imran Khan from April 2021 until April 2022.

Previously, he served as federal minister for energy from 11 September 2018 to 16 April 2021. He had been a member of the National Assembly of Pakistan from August 2018 till January 2023. He is the grandson of the former President of Pakistan Ayub Khan, and the son of Gohar Ayub Khan, who was also a politician. Previously, he served as a member of the National Assembly from 2002 to 2007 and again from 2014 to 2015. He also served as the Minister of State for Finance in the federal cabinet from 2004 to 2007. He has served as Secretary General of Pakistan Tehreek-e-Insaf since he assumed the role on 27 May 2023. He resigned from the position on 4 September 2024, and his resignation was accepted by Imran Khan on 7 September.

In 2025, he was sentenced to 10 years in prison by the Faisalabad Court for his alleged connections to the May 9 riots in 2023.

== Early life and education ==
Khan was born on 26 January 1970 to Gohar Ayub Khan, a politician and retired army officer belonging to the Pakistan Muslim League (N). He is the grandson of President Ayub Khan, who became President of Pakistan from 1958 to 1969 and was also the 1st Commander-in-Chief of Pakistan Army .

He obtained his early education at Army Burn Hall College and completed his high schooling at Aitchison College. In 1989, he moved to the United States for higher studies, and the next year he took a semester off to help his father run the election campaign, which became his introduction to politics. In 1993, he completed his BBA, followed by his MBA in 1996, both from the George Washington University.

== Political career ==
=== Pakistan Muslim League (Q) ===
He was elected to the National Assembly of Pakistan from Constituency NA-19 (Haripur) as a candidate of Pakistan Muslim League (Q) (PML-Q) in 2002 Pakistani general election. He received 81,496 votes and defeated Pir Sabir Shah. Khan was inducted into the federal cabinet of Prime Minister Shaukat Aziz and was appointed the Minister of State for Finance where he served from 2004 to 2007.

He ran for the seat of the National Assembly from Constituency NA-19 (Haripur) as a candidate of PML (Q) in 2008 Pakistani general election, but was unsuccessful. He received 50,631 votes and lost the seat to Sardar Muhammad Mushtaq Khan.

=== Pakistan Muslim League (N) ===
He joined Pakistan Muslim League (N) (PML-N) in 2012. He ran for the seat of the National Assembly from Constituency NA-19 (Haripur) as a candidate of PML (N) in 2013 Pakistani general election, but was unsuccessful. He received 116,308 votes and lost the seat to Raja Aamer Zaman.

He was re-elected to the National Assembly from Constituency NA-19 (Haripur) as a candidate of PML (N) in the by-election held in 2014 and also served as Chairman Standing Committee on Finance, Revenue and Economic Affairs. In 2015, he was unseated as he became ineligible to continue in office as constituency election was invalidated by voting irregularities due to rigging.

=== Pakistan Tehreek-e-Insaf ===
In February 2018, he joined Pakistan Tehreek-e-Insaf (PTI). He was re-elected to the National Assembly from Constituency NA-17 (Haripur) as a candidate of PTI in 2018 Pakistani general election. He received 172,609 votes and defeated Babar Nawaz Khan.

On 11 September 2018, he was inducted into the federal cabinet of Prime Minister Imran Khan and was appointed Federal Minister for Power.

On 24 April 2019 after the Prime Minister reshuffled the cabinet team, he was given the additional charge of the Ministry of Petroleum, which was previously held by Ghulam Sarwar Khan.

In mid-April 2021 Prime Minister Imran Khan reshuffled the Cabinet, again transferring Omar Ayub Khan from Minister of Energy to Minister of Economic Affairs.

Khan was reelected to the National Assembly as a PTI-affiliated independent following the party's banning. On 16 February, senior PTI official Asad Qaiser said that Imran Khan had nominated Ayub Khan as the party's nominee for prime minister, despite him being in hiding over charges relating to the May 9 riots in 2023.

Omar Ayub Khan was a key member in organizing the Imran Khan-led 2022 Long March, a protest against the PML(N) government and the military establishment’s role in politics, in the long march he was severely wounded and bruised by police.

==== Leader of the Opposition ====
Ayub played a leadership role in the Pakistan Tehreek-e-Insaf (PTI) following Imran Khan’s removal from office. Ayub was given a high leadership role in the upcoming 2024 Pakistani elections, in which he served as the PTI-Independents candidate for prime minister, campaign head and Secretary-General. Omar Ayub participated by holding press conferences and taking a party leadership role alongside Gohar Ali Khan. Ayub is a key advocate for Imran Khan and claims that the 2024 elections were rigged. Following the 2024 elections which Omar Ayub and the PTI alleged were rigged, Ayub was elected as 12th Leader of Opposition by PTI-SIC parliamentarians. As Leader of the Opposition, he has furthered the claims that the elections were rigged, as well as delivered pro-Imran Khan and anti-Military establishment in politics speeches inside the National Assembly of Pakistan.

On 27 June 2024, (Note: The resignation papers shown by Omar Ayub Khan were dated on 22 June 2024.) Ayub announced his resignation as Pakistan Tehreek-e-Insaf's chairman of the central finance board and party secretary general, announcing on Twitter that his resignation letter addressed to Imran Khan and Gohar Ali Khan had been accepted. He remarked that he would continue as opposition leader in the NA and as a party worker, citing as opposition leader he was not able to fulfil the role of party general secretary, calling for another appointment in his place. The resignation came amidst reports of 27 PTI-backed Sunni Ittehad MNAs resigning from the National Assembly in protest against party leadership and criticism from other party leaders including Sher Afzal Marwat, Shahryar Afridi, Shandana Gulzar and ex-PTI leader Fawad Chaudhry. According to reports, 21 of these MNAs displayed their intention to establish a "forward bloc" due to party leaderships failure to release Imran Khan from jail. The next day on 28 June, a PTI parliamentary party meeting resolution called for rejecting Omar Ayub's resignation supporting Ayub's running of the party during "testing times" and "unanimously" expressing confidence in him. The party meeting was attended by Gohar Ali Khan, Omar Ayub Khan, Asad Gohar, Ali Muhammad Khan and others. On 4 September 2024, Ayub tendered his resignation for the second time as the party's secretary general, which according to him was accepted by PTI founder Imran Khan.

On 21 October 2024, he argued against the Twenty-sixth Amendment to the Constitution of Pakistan, which he said would undermine the independence of the Judiciary. He further claimed the legislation would "slaughter democracy". He added that "Our [PTI's] members Mubarak Zeb Khan, Zahoor Hussain Qureshi, Aurangzeb Khan Khichi, Riaz Fatyana, Zain Qureshi and Adil Khan Bazai were harassed and intimidated".

On 31 July 2025, Ayub and 195 others were convicted by a court in Faisalabad and sentenced to up to 10 years' imprisonment over the 2023 Pakistani protests. On 5 August 2025, Election Commission of Pakistan disqualified him due to his conviction in terrorism cases.

== Publications ==
- Roles and Responsibilities of MNAs, Pakistan Institute of Legislative Development and Transparency, 2008.
