= Sardar Muhammad Mushtaq Khan =

Pakistani politician

Member of the National Assembly of Pakistan
- In office 2008–2013
- Constituency: NA-19 (Haripur)

Member of the Provincial Assembly of Khyber Pakhtunkhwa
- In office 1993–1996
- Constituency: PF-39 (Haripur)
- In office 1997–1999
- Constituency: PF-39 (Haripur)

Personal details
- Party: Pakistan Muslim League (N)

Sardar Muhammad Mushtaq Khan is a Pakistani politician and Landlord who has been a member of the National Assembly of Pakistan from 2008 to 2013 and a member of the Provincial Assembly of Khyber Pakhtunkhwa from 1993 to 1999.

== Political career ==
He was elected to the Provincial Assembly of Khyber Pakhtunkhwa as a candidate of the Pakistan Muslim League (N) (PML-N) from Constituency PF-39 (Haripur) in the 1993 Pakistani general election. He received 24,867 votes and defeated a candidate of Pakistan Muslim League (J).

He was re-elected to the Provincial Assembly of Khyber Pakhtunkhwa as a candidate for PML-N from Constituency PF-39 (Haripur) in the 1997 Pakistani general election. He received 24,287 votes and defeated Raja Aamer Zaman.

He was elected to the National Assembly of Pakistan as a candidate of PML-N for Constituency NA-19 (Haripur) in the 2008 Pakistani general election.

In 2012, he left PML-N to join the Pakistan Peoples Party (PPP).

He ran for a seat in the National Assembly as a candidate of the PPP from Constituency NA-19 (Haripur) in the 2013 Pakistani general election but was unsuccessful.

He rejoined the PML-N in August 2015.
