= Khanpur Tehsil, Haripur =

Administrative division in Khyber Pakhtunkhwa, Pakistan

Khanpur Tehsil تحصیل خانپور خانپور تحصیل
- Tehsil
- Interactive map of Khanpur Tehsil
- Coordinates: 33°48′53″N 72°56′22″E
- Country: Pakistan
- Region: Khyber Pakhtunkhwa
- Division: Hazara
- District: Haripur
- Seat: Khanpur

Government
  - Chairman: Raja Haroon Sikandar (PML(N))
- Elevation: 545 m (1,788 ft)
- Time zone: UTC+5 (PST)
- Postal code: 22650
- Area code: 0995

Khanpur Tehsil (Urdu: خان پور) is an administrative subdivision (tehsil) of Haripur District in the Khyber Pakhtunkhwa province of Pakistan, the mayor of khanpur Tehsil is Raja Haroon Sikandar grandson of Former chief minister of Khyber Pakhtunkhwa Raja Sikandar Zaman. Khanpur Dam is located near Khanpur Town. It is located to the south of the district capital Haripur.

== Demography ==
According to the 2023 census the total population of Khanpur Tehsil was 186,886 of which 92,914 were male and 93,969 were female. The census also recorded religious affiliation as follows: 186197 Muslim, 404 Christians, 17 Hindus, 1 Ahmadi Muslim, 5 Sikhs and 11 listed as others.

Religious affiliation of residents
Religion	Followers	Percentage
Muslim	186,197	99.77%
Christian	404	0.22%
Hindu	17	0.01%
Ahmadis	1	<0.01%
Sikh	5	<0.01%
Others	11	0.01%

The mother tongue of residents were recorded as follows: 2,933 Urdu, 817 Punjabi, 4 Sindhi, 11,755 Pushto, 9 Balochi, 216 Kashmiri, 114 Saraiki, 167,790 Hindko, 45 Brahvi, 20 Shina, 21 Balti, 320 Kohistani and 2,592 listed as others.

Mother tongue of residents
Language	Speakers	Percentage
Urdu	2,933	1.57%
Punjabi	817	0.44%
Sindhi	4	<0.01%
Pushto	11,755	6.30%
Balochi	9	<0.01%
Kashmiri	216	0.12%
Saraiki	114	0.06%
Hindko	167,790	89.90%
Brahvi	45	0.02%
Shina	20	0.01%
Balti	21	0.01%
Kohistani	320	0.17%
Others	2,592	1.39%
