= Ajmal Khan (Islamia College University) =

Pakistani college administrator

Muhammad Ajmal Khan
- Born: Charsadda, Khyber Pakhtunkhwa, Pakistan
- Awards: Sitara-i-Imtiaz
- Scientific career
- Workplaces: Edwardes College, Peshawar; University of Peshawar; Islamia College University

Muhammad Ajmal Khan was the first Vice-Chancellor of Islamia College University, Peshawar from 26 June 2008 to 25 June 2016. He is also a cousin of Awami National Party chief Asfandyar Wali Khan.

== Career ==
After receiving his education from Burn Hall Abbottabad and Peshawar University, Ajmal Khan started off his career as a lecturer at Edwardes College, Peshawar. Dr. Khan also remained associated with the University of Peshawar as deputy provost, provost and registrar and was later appointed as the principal of Islamia College University. Khan also served at Gomal University, Dera Ismail Khan as a Vice-Chancellor and then returned as the first Vice-Chancellor of Islamia College University-when Islamia College became a university in 2008.

== Kidnapping ==
Khan was kidnapped from Professors Colony on Peshawar's University Road along with his ramesh vidhani driver Mohibullah in September 2010 by Tehrik-i-Taliban Pakistan (TTP) while on the way to the university. TTP demanded the release of four Taliban prisoners in exchange for Dr. Khan's release but the government had earlier refused the offer. They then threatened to kill the professor if the government failed to accept their demands. An earlier deadline had been extended by the militants after appeals by his family and religious scholars hailing from Khan's native Charsadda district. Security officials said that the kidnapping of Khan was used as a bargaining tool for the release of their militants being held by Pakistani authorities. A statement issued by the Inter-Services Public Relations (ISPR) said that security forces and intelligence agencies had been trying to locate Khan.

Mohibullah was released on September 16, 2012, in exchange for one Taliban prisoner. Khan was released on August 28, 2014, in exchange for three Taliban prisoners.

"I was kidnapped by armed men from the Professors Colony. They whisked me up into a vehicle and injected some intoxicating medicine and when I regained consciousness I was in a mountainous region. Tehreek-i-Taliban Pakistan (TTP) kept me in Waziristan Agency and the security forces helped me in getting freedom and I was never tortured while in Taliban custody and mostly spent my time reading books and praying. I spent four years in captivity and am thankful to Allah Almighty I am back. I am really happy to return home and see my family."

— Prof. Ajmal Khan speaking to Dawn

"The militant group had orders to kidnap former Khyber Pakhtunkhwa Information Minister Mian Iftikhar Hussain or me (Ajmal Khan).I had lengthy discussions with the Sajna group over suicide attacks and the group admitted that blasts and suicide attacks in Bazaars, mosques and in funeral processions were against the teachings of Islam. And I did not meet the sons of Yousaf Raza Gillani and Salmaan Taseer when they were in the custody of the Taliban."

== Rejoining ==
On September 9, 2014, he took charge as Vice Chancellor of Islamia College University, Peshawar, again after four years, and the staff presented a bouquet of flowers to him when he reached the university.

== Sitara-e-Imtiaz ==
In light of the services rendered by Islamia College University, Peshawar Vice Chancellor Ajmal Khan in the field of education, President Mamnoon Hussain has awarded him the Sitara-e-Imtiaz.

== Controversy ==
The Peshawar High Court (PHC) issued a notice on Khan on October 29, 2015, after a petitioner challenged his eligibility for the post of Vice Chancellor at Islamia College University Peshawar.
