= Raja Sikander Zaman =

Pakistani politician

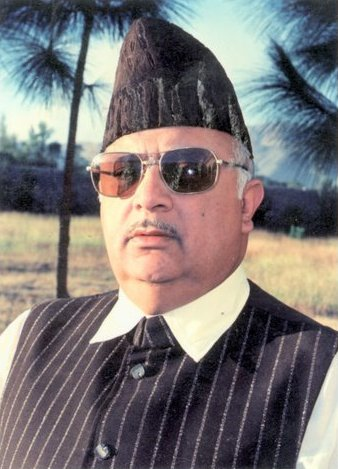
- Minister: Federal Minister for Water, Power and Natural Resources, Senior Minister Excise and Revenue

Chief Minister of North-West Frontier Province (Caretaker)
- In office 12 November 1996 – 21 February 1997
- Preceded by: Aftab Ahmed Sherpao
- Succeeded by: Mehtab Abbasi

Personal details
- Born: 1935 Khanpur, North-West Frontier Province, British India
- Died: 16 March 2007 (aged 71–72) Islamabad, Pakistan
- Children: Raja Shadab Sikander; Raja Aamer Zaman; Raja Faisal Zaman

Raja Sikandar Zaman Khan (Urdu: راجہ سکندر زمان; 1935 – 16 March 2007) was a Pakistani politician and the former Chief Minister of Khyber-Pakhtunkhwa. During a 50-year political career, he served on various political positions in Pakistan, and as opposition leader in the NWFP Assembly. His first political office was in the 1960s as a member of the Abbottabad District Council.

== Early life and education ==
He was born in Khanpur, Hazara in 1935. He was a grandson of Raja Jehandad Khan, the chief of the Gakhars tribe. His father, Sultan Capt. Raja Haider Zaman Khan and his older brother Sultan Raja Rukan Zaman were also active in politics. He received his early education from Burn Hall School in Abbottabad and Aligarh University.

== Career ==
He started his political career as a Member of the Abbottabad District Council in the 1950s, while his brother Sultan Raja Rukan Zaman was a Member Legislative Assembly in West Pakistan. He remained Chief Minister of Khyber-Pakhtunkhwa and Minister for WAPDA, Education, and Revenue respectively. He was also the opposition leader in the Khyber-Pakhtunkhwa Assembly and a senior minister in the provincial cabinet.

Brief History of Political Career, MPA, 1957 Lahore Assembly Chairman, Union Council Khanpur, 1960; Senior Vice Chairman, Hazara Division, 1965 Provincial Minister for Education, Sports and Tourism, 1973 Provincial Minister for Agriculture- (1977) Federal Minister for Water, Power and Natural Resources (1981–1985), MNA and Opposition Leader (1988), Senior Minister Excise and Revenue (1990–1993)

Political offices
Preceded by Aftab Ahmad Sherpao	Chief Minister of Khyber-Pakhtunkhwa (caretaker); 1996 – 1997	Succeeded by Mehtab Ahmed Khan
