= PK-47 Haripur-II =

Pakistani electoral district

- Constituency for the Khyber Pakhtunkhwa Assembly
- Region: Haripur Tehsil (partly) Khanpur Tehsil (partly) of Haripur District

Current constituency
- Party: Pakistan Tehreek-e-Insaf
- Member(s): Arshad Ayub Khan
- Created from: PK-49 Haripur-I (2002-2018); PK-41 Haripur-II (2018-2023)

PK-47 Haripur-II (پی کے-47 ہری پور-2) is a constituency for the Khyber Pakhtunkhwa Assembly of the Khyber Pakhtunkhwa province of Pakistan.

== See also ==
- PK-46 Haripur-I
- PK-48 Haripur-III
