= PK-46 Haripur-I =

Pakistani electoral district

- Constituency for the Khyber Pakhtunkhwa Assembly
- Region: Haripur Tehsil (partly) including Haripur city of Haripur District

Current constituency
- Party: Pakistan Tehreek-e-Insaf
- Member(s): Akbar Ayub Khan
- Created from: PK-50 Haripur-II (2002-2018); PK-40 Haripur-I (2018-2023)

PK-46 Haripur-I (پی کے-46 ہری پور-1) is a constituency for the Khyber Pakhtunkhwa Assembly of the Khyber Pakhtunkhwa province of Pakistan.

== See also ==
- PK-45 Abbottabad-IV
- PK-47 Haripur-II
