= PK-48 Haripur-III =

Pakistani electoral district

- Constituency for the Khyber Pakhtunkhwa Assembly
- Region: Ghazi Tehsil and Haripur Tehsil (partly) of Haripur District

Current constituency
- Party: Pakistan Tehreek-e-Insaf
- Member: Malik Adeel Iqbal Awan
- Created from: PK-51 Haripur-III (2002-2018); PK-42 Haripur-III (2018-2023)

PK-48 Haripur-III (پی کے-48 ہری پور-3) is a constituency for the Khyber Pakhtunkhwa Assembly of the Khyber Pakhtunkhwa province of Pakistan.

== See also ==
- PK-47 Haripur-II
- PK-49 Swabi-I
