= 2024 Khyber Pakhtunkhwa provincial election =

Pakistani provincial election

- 8 February 2024

115 out of 145 seats in the Khyber Pakhtunkhwa Assembly (Note: 26 seats are reserved for women and 8 are reserved for non-Muslims filled through Proportional representation) 73 seats needed for a majority
- Registered: 21,928,119
- Turnout: 39.5% (▼6.02%)
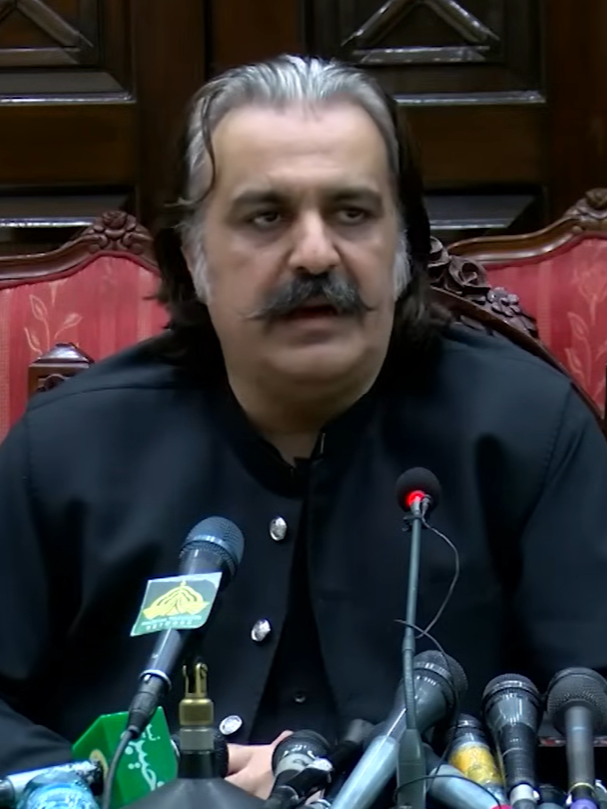

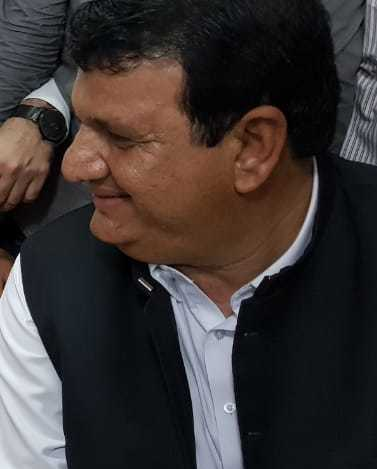
| | First party | Second party | Third party |
|---|---|---|---|
| Leader | Ali Amin Gandapur | Akram Khan Durrani | Amir Muqam |
| Party | PTI (designated as IND) | JUI (F) | PML(N) |
| Leader since | 3 June 2023 | 2 October 2018 | 18 April 2017 |
| Leader's seat | Dera Ismail Khan-III | Bannu-IV | Swat-III (lost) |
| Last election | 85 seats, 32.32% | Did not contest (Note: JUI (F) did not contest the 2018 elections, as they were part of an electoral alliance called Muttahida Majlis-e-Amal, which had won 13 seats and 18.01% of the vote) | 6 seats, 10.47% |
| Seats before | 95 | 13 | 7 |
| Seats won | 93 | 19 | 19 |
| Seat change | ▼2 | ▲6 | ▲12 |
| Popular vote | 3,160,946 | 1,269,230 | 625,515 |
| Percentage | 38.44% | 15.44% | 7.61% |
| Swing | ▲6.12pp | ▼2.57pp | ▼2.86pp |
- Map of Khyber Pakhtunkhwa showing Provincial Assembly constituencies and winning parties.
Chief Minister before election
Mahmood Khan
PTI
Elected Chief Minister
Ali Amin Gandapur
PTI-Ind.

Provincial elections were held in the Pakistani province of Khyber Pakhtunkhwa on 8 February 2024 to elect members of the 12th Provincial Assembly of Khyber Pakhtunkhwa. On 5 August 2023, the results of the 2023 digital census were approved by the Council of Common Interests headed by Prime Minister Shehbaz Sharif. Therefore, elections have been delayed for several months, as new delimitations will be published on 14 December 2023, as announced by the Election Commission of Pakistan (ECP). On 2 November 2023, the ECP announced, in agreement with the President of Pakistan, Arif Alvi, that the elections would be held on 8 February 2024. This election was held concurrently with nationwide general elections and other provincial elections.

== Background ==
In the 2018 election, the Pakistan Tehreek-e-Insaf (PTI) won a landslide victory in the province by securing a two-thirds majority in the Khyber Pakhtunkhwa Assembly. The PTI became the only party in the province's history to return to government with more seats after completing a 5-year term.

Before the 2018 elections, Jamiat Ulema-e-Islam (F) (JUI-F) and Jamaat-e-Islami (JI) restored their electoral alliance, the Muttahida Majlis-e-Amal, to counter the PTI's support but failed to make gains and in fact lost even more seats.

The Pashtun nationalist and leftist Awami National Party (ANP) also failed to counter the PTI, but slightly increased their share of seats.

The conservative Pakistan Muslim league (N) (PML-N) once the most popular party in the Hazara Division, also faced defeat and was nearly wiped out from the region.

Due to circumstances arising after the successful motion of no confidence against Prime Minister Imran Khan, a motion of no confidence was also filed to remove Chief Minister Mahmood Khan from office. The motion was rejected on 11 April 2022, as 88 votes were cast against the motion to just 2 in favor.

On 26 June 2022, the PTI flipped the PK-7 Swat-VI constituency in a by-election, winning by a margin of 4,341 votes and defeated the ANP, which enjoyed the support of the Pakistan Democratic Movement (PDM), particularly the JUI(F) and PML(N).

On 17 January 2023, Chief Minister Khan sent a letter to Governor Haji Ghulam Ali, advising him to dissolve the Provincial Assembly. Ali accepted the advice the next day. Elections must be conducted within 90 days of the dissolution, meaning by or before 18 April 2023.

After two days of talks, on 20 January 2023, the government and opposition agreed on appointing Muhammad Azam Khan, a former bureaucrat, as the caretaker Chief Minister.

After a month of delay from Governor Ali and the Election Commission of Pakistan (ECP), President Arif Alvi decided to unilaterally appoint 9 April 2023 as the date for the provincial election.

On 1 March 2023, in a 3-2 split verdict, the Supreme Court ruled that since Governor Ali had dissolved the Assembly, he was "in breach of his constitutional duty" by not appointing an election date and should immediately do so, after consultation with the ECP. As a consequence, the date appointed by President Alvi was set aside.

On 15 March 2023, Governor Ali suggested the date for the provincial election to be 28 May 2023. However, on 24 March, in a letter to the ECP, he sought a postponement of the elections to 8 October. Consequently, on 29 March, the ECP announced that they would hold the provincial elections on 8 October.

On 25 March 2023, Mushtaq Ahmed Ghani, the Speaker of the Provincial Assembly of Khyber Pakhtunkhwa, filed a constitutional petition and a contempt of court petition in the Supreme Court on behalf of the PTI, over the violation of the Supreme Court's March 1 verdict. However, no verdict had been issued.

After the 2023 Pakistani protests, Pervez Khattak, the Chief Minister of the province from 2013 to 2018, was accused of inciting other PTI members to leave the party. Due to this, his basic party membership was terminated on 12 July 2023. Five days later, on 17 July, Khattak announced the formation of his new party, Pakistan Tehreek-e-Insaf Parliamentarians (PTI-P) and many politicians across the province, mainly from the PTI, joined the new party. The most notable of these politicians was Chief Minister Mahmood Khan.

In July, 52 former MPAs of the PTI signed a letter to the ECP seeking a "level-playing field" and alleging that the caretaker cabinet "consists almost exclusively of nominees from parties of Pakistan Democratic Movement and their allies like PPP and ANP". A month later, the ECP asked caretaker Chief Minister Muhammad Azam Khan to sack ministers who were openly involved in politics. As a result, on 10 August 2023, twenty-five members of the caretaker cabinet had tendered their resignations to the Chief Minister. One day later, the Governor accepted all of their resignations.

=== Ban on PTI from contesting as a party ===
On 22 December 2023, the Election Commission of Pakistan (ECP) decided against letting the PTI retain its electoral symbol, arguing that the party had failed to hold intra-party elections. On 22 December, the PTI approached the Peshawar High Court (PHC) against the ECP's order and hence, a single-member bench suspended the ECP's order until 9 January 2024. On 30 December 2023, the ECP filed a review application within the PHC, and days later, a two-member bench withdrew the suspension order as it heard the case. However, on 10 January 2024, the two-member bench had declared the ECP's order to be "illegal, without any lawful authority, and of no legal effect. On 11 January, the ECP challenged this ruling in the Supreme Court, and on 13 January, a three-member bench ruled in favor of the ECP and stripped the PTI of its electoral symbol. As a consequence of this ruling, the PTI could not allot party tickets to any of its candidates. Therefore, all candidates of the party will be listed as independent candidates and each will have a different electoral symbol.

== Schedule ==
The schedule of the election was announced by the Election Commission of Pakistan (ECP) on 15 December 2023. The by-elections for PK-22 and PK-91 constituencies, which were postponed due to an ISIS-K assassination and an unexpected heart failure, respectively, were announced by the ECP on 14 March and took place on 21 April 2024.

| Sr no | Poll Event | Schedule |
|---|---|---|
| 1 | Public Notice Issued by the Returning Officers | 19 December 2023 |
| 2 | Dates of filing Nomination papers with the Returning Officers by the candidates | 20 December 2023 to 24 December 2023 |
| 3 | Publication of names of the nominated candidates. | 24 December 2023 |
| 4 | Last date of scrutiny of nomination papers by the Returning Officer | 25 December 2023 to 30 December 2023 |
| 5 | Last date of filing appeals against decisions of the Returning Officer rejecting/accepting nomination papers. | 3 January 2024 |
| 6 | Last date for deciding of appeals by the Appellate Tribunal | 10 January 2024 |
| 7 | Publication of revised list of candidates | 11 January 2024 |
| 8 | Last date of withdrawal of candidate and publication of revised list of candidates | 12 January 2024 |
| 9 | Allotment of election symbol to contesting candidates | 13 January 2024 |
| 10 | Polling and preliminary vote counts | 8 February 2024 |
| 11 | Postponed elections in PK-22 and PK-91 constituencies | 21 April 2024 |
| 12 | Publication of final vote counts | Unknown |

== Electoral system ==
The 145 seats of the Khyber Pakhtunkhwa Assembly consist of 115 general seats, whose members are elected by the first-past-the-post voting system through single-member constituencies. 26 seats are reserved for women and 8 seats are reserved for non-Muslims. The members on these seats are elected through proportional representation based on the total number of general seats secured by each political party.

== Opinion polls ==
| Polling firm | Last date of polling | Link | PTI | JUIF | ANP | PML(N) | PPP | JI | MMA | Ind. | Other | Lead | Sample size | Undecideds & Non-voters (Note: This is a column that lists the percentage of undecided voters and non-voters in certain polls that publish this data. As some polls do not publish any data whatsoever on undecided voters and non-voters, the columns with survey participants that had a preference when polled are all that is needed to reach 100%. In surveys that do include data on non-voters and undecided voters, a scaling factor is applied to the margin of error and the rest of the data (for example, if the number of undecideds and non-voters equals 20%, each party would have their vote share scaled up by a factor of 100/80 (the formula is 100/(100-UndecidedPercentage)). This is done to keep consistency between the different polls and the different types data they provide.) |
|---|---|---|---|---|---|---|---|---|---|---|---|---|---|---|
| Gallup Pakistan | 30 June 2023 | PDF | 69% | 1% | 1% | 12% | 2% | 0% | -- | 15% | | 57% | 3,500 | N/A (Note: This poll or crosstabulation did not include any data about undecided voters or non-voters and cut them out completely from the published results.) |
| PA | 18 January 2023 | The Provincial Assembly is dissolved and a provincial snap election is called. | | | | | | | | | | | | |
| NA | 11-12 April 2022 | Imran Khan is removed from office in a no-confidence motion | | | | | | | | | | | | |
| IPOR (IRI) | 21 March 2022 | PDF | 38% | 23% | 8% | 13% | 8% | 3% | -- | 7% | | 15% | ~600 | N/A |
| Gallup Pakistan | 31 January 2022 | PDF | 32% | 9% | 4% | 15% | 6% | 2% | -- | 1% | 3% | 17% | ~970 | 28% |
| IPOR (IRI) | 9 January 2022 | PDF | 44% | 17% | 11% | 11% | 7% | 3% | -- | 7% | | 27% | 641 | N/A |
| IPOR (IRI) | 11 November 2020 | PDF | 34% | 8% | 3% | 12% | 4% | 3% | -- | 36% | | 22% | 331 | N/A |
| 2018 Elections | 25 July 2018 | ECP | 32.3% | New | 12.2% | 10.5% | 9.7% | New | 17.1% | 14.9% | 3.3% | 20.4% | 6,255,014 | N/A |

== Results ==
=== Result by party ===
| 58 | 9 | 9 | 5 | 2 | 2 | 31 |
| PTI | JUI (F) | PML(N) | PPP | PTI(P) | ANP | IND |

Vote Share of different parties in the election.
1. PTI (38.4%)
2. JUI (F) (15.4%)
3. ANP (8.46%)
4. JI (5.31%)
5. PML(N) (7.61%)
6. PPP (6.21%)
7. PTI-P (3.88%)
8. IPP (14.7%)
9. 0.00%
Seat Share of different parties in the election.
1. PTI (80.0%)
2. JUI (F) (6.21%)
3. PML(N) (6.21%)
4. PPP (3.45%)
5. PTI-P (1.38%)
6. ANP (0.69%)
7. IPP (0.69%)
8. Postponed (1.38%)

| Party | Votes | % | Seats | | | | |
| Party | Votes | % | General | Independents joined | Women | Minority | Total |
|---|---|---|---|---|---|---|---|
| PTI | 3,160,946 | 38.44 | 87 | 4 | – | – | 91 |
| JUI (F) | 1,269,230 | 15.44 | 7 | 0 | 2 | 0 | 9 |
| ANP | 695,738 | 8.46 | 1 | 0 | 0 | 0 | 2 |
| JIP | 436,383 | 5.31 | 0 | 0 | 0 | 0 | 0 |
| PMLN | 625,515 | 7.61 | 5 | 2 | 2 | 0 | 9 |
| PPP | 510,982 | 6.21 | 4 | 0 | 1 | 0 | 5 |
| PTI-P | 319,026 | 3.88 | 2 | 0 | 0 | 0 | 2 |
| IPP | 1,205,007 | 14.65 | 0 | 0 | 0 | 0 | 0 |
| TLP | 0 | 0.00 | 0 | 0 | 0 | 0 | 0 |
| Total | 8,222,827 | 100.00 | 106 | 6 | 5 | 0 | 118 |
Source: ECP Gallup

=== Results by division ===
| Division | Seats | PTI (Note: Contesting as independent candidates in all constituencies) | JUI(F) | PML(N) | PPP | PTI(P) | ANP | IND | Others | Postponed |
| Malakand | 30 | 27 | 0 | 2 | 0 | 0 | 1 | 0 | 0 | 0 |
| Hazara | 18 | 13 | 1 | 1 | 0 | 0 | 0 | 3 | 0 | 0 |
| Mardan | 13 | 13 | 0 | 0 | 0 | 0 | 0 | 0 | 0 | 0 |
| Peshawar | 28 | 19 | 1 | 2 | 2 | 1 | 1 | 2 | 0 | 0 |
| Kohat | 9 | 7 | 1 | 0 | 0 | 0 | 0 | 1 | 0 | 0 |
| Bannu | 9 | 5 | 2 | 0 | 0 | 1 | 0 | 1 | 0 | 0 |
| Dera Ismail Khan | 8 | 4 | 2 | 0 | 2 | 0 | 0 | 0 | 0 | 0 |
| Total | 115 | 88 | 7 | 5 | 4 | 2 | 2 | 7 | 0 | 0 |

=== Results by district ===
| Division | District | Seats | PTI | JUI(F) | PML(N) | PPP | PTI(P) | ANP | IND | Others | Postponed |
| Malakand | Upper Chitral | 1 | 1 | 0 | 0 | 0 | 0 | 0 | 0 | 0 | 0 |
| Malakand | Lower Chitral | 1 | 1 | 0 | 0 | 0 | 0 | 0 | 0 | 0 | 0 |
| Malakand | Swat | 8 | 8 | 0 | 0 | 0 | 0 | 0 | 0 | 0 | 0 |
| Malakand | Upper Dir | 3 | 3 | 0 | 0 | 0 | 0 | 0 | 0 | 0 | 0 |
| Malakand | Lower Dir | 5 | 5 | 0 | 0 | 0 | 0 | 0 | 0 | 0 | 0 |
| Malakand | Bajaur | 4 | 3 | 0 | 0 | 0 | 0 | 1 | 0 | 0 | 0 |
| Malakand | Malakand | 2 | 2 | 0 | 0 | 0 | 0 | 0 | 0 | 0 | 0 |
| Malakand | Buner | 3 | 3 | 0 | 0 | 0 | 0 | 0 | 0 | 0 | 0 |
| Malakand | Shangla | 3 | 1 | 0 | 2 | 0 | 0 | 0 | 0 | 0 | 0 |
| Hazara | Upper Kohistan | 1 | 0 | 0 | 0 | 0 | 0 | 0 | 1 | 0 | 0 |
| Hazara | Lower Kohistan | 1 | 0 | 1 | 0 | 0 | 0 | 0 | 0 | 0 | 0 |
| Hazara | Kolai-Palas | 1 | 0 | 0 | 0 | 0 | 0 | 0 | 1 | 0 | 0 |
| Hazara | Battagram | 2 | 2 | 0 | 0 | 0 | 0 | 0 | 0 | 0 | 0 |
| Hazara | Mansehra | 5 | 4 | 0 | 1 | 0 | 0 | 0 | 0 | 0 | 0 |
| Hazara | Torghar | 1 | 0 | 0 | 0 | 0 | 0 | 0 | 1 | 0 | 0 |
| Hazara | Abbottabad | 4 | 4 | 0 | 0 | 0 | 0 | 0 | 0 | 0 | 0 |
| Hazara | Haripur | 3 | 3 | 0 | 0 | 0 | 0 | 0 | 0 | 0 | 0 |
| Mardan | Swabi | 5 | 5 | 0 | 0 | 0 | 0 | 0 | 0 | 0 | 0 |
| Mardan | Mardan | 8 | 8 | 0 | 0 | 0 | 0 | 0 | 0 | 0 | 0 |
| Peshawar | Charsadda | 5 | 4 | 0 | 0 | 0 | 0 | 0 | 1 | 0 | 0 |
| Peshawar | Mohmand | 2 | 2 | 0 | 0 | 0 | 0 | 0 | 0 | 0 | 0 |
| Peshawar | Khyber | 3 | 3 | 0 | 0 | 0 | 0 | 0 | 0 | 0 | 0 |
| Peshawar | Peshawar | 13 | 5 | 1 | 2 | 2 | 1 | 1 | 1 | 0 | 0 |
| Peshawar | Nowshera | 5 | 5 | 0 | 0 | 0 | 0 | 0 | 0 | 0 | 0 |
| Kohat | Kohat | 3 | 3 | 0 | 0 | 0 | 0 | 0 | 0 | 0 | |
| Kohat | Hangu | 1 | 1 | 0 | 0 | 0 | 0 | 0 | 0 | 0 | 0 |
| Kohat | Orakzai | 1 | 1 | 0 | 0 | 0 | 0 | 0 | 0 | 0 | 0 |
| Kohat | Kurram | 2 | 0 | 1 | 0 | 0 | 0 | 0 | 1 | 0 | 0 |
| Kohat | Karak | 2 | 2 | 0 | 0 | 0 | 0 | 0 | 0 | 0 | 0 |
| Bannu | Bannu | 4 | 2 | 2 | 0 | 0 | 0 | 0 | 0 | 0 | 0 |
| Bannu | North Waziristan | 2 | 1 | 0 | 0 | 0 | 1 | 0 | 0 | 0 | 0 |
| Bannu | Lakki Marwat | 3 | 2 | 0 | 0 | 0 | 0 | 0 | 1 | 0 | 0 |
| Dera Ismail Khan | Tank | 1 | 1 | 0 | 0 | 0 | 0 | 0 | 0 | 0 | 0 |
| Dera Ismail Khan | Upper South Waziristan | 1 | 1 | 0 | 0 | 0 | 0 | 0 | 0 | 0 | 0 |
| Dera Ismail Khan | Lower South Waziristan | 1 | 1 | 0 | 0 | 0 | 0 | 0 | 0 | 0 | 0 |
| Dera Ismail Khan | Dera Ismail Khan | 5 | 1 | 2 | 0 | 2 | 0 | 0 | 0 | 0 | 0 |
| Total | | 115 | 88 | 7 | 5 | 4 | 2 | 2 | 7 | 0 | 0 |

=== Results by constituency ===
| District | Constituency | | Winner | | | | Runner Up | | | | Margin | Turnout % |
| District | No. | Name | Candidate | Party | Votes | % | Candidate | Party | Votes | % | Margin | Turnout % |
|---|---|---|---|---|---|---|---|---|---|---|---|---|
| Upper Chitral | PK-1 | Upper Chitral | Suraya Bibi | PTI | 18,914 | 29.50 | Shakeel Ahmad | JUI(F) | 10,533 | 16.43 | 8,381 | 50.48 |
| Lower Chitral | PK-2 | Lower Chitral | Fateh ul-Mulk Nasir | PTI | 28,510 | 28.96 | Saleem Khan | PPP | 22,995 | 23.36 | 5,515 | 55.45 |
| Swat | PK-3 | Swat-I | Sharafat Ali | PTI | 25,170 | 37.51 | Jahangir | PML(N) | 11,774 | 17.54 | 13,396 | 32.73 |
| Swat | PK-4 | Swat-II | Ali Shah | PTI | 30,022 | 47.31 | Sardar Khan | PML(N) | 12,514 | 19.72 | 17,508 | 38.28 |
| Swat | PK-5 | Swat-III | Akhtar Khan | PTI | 24,055 | 40.47 | Sanaullah Khan | JUI(F) | 15,462 | 26.01 | 8,593 | 41.34 |
| Swat | PK-6 | Swat-IV | Fazal Hakim | PTI | 25,330 | 32.65 | Iftikhar Ahmad | PTI(P) | 19,422 | 25.04 | 5,908 | 40.35 |
| Swat | PK-7 | Swat-V | Amjad Ali | PTI | 25,129 | 38.66 | Habib Ali Shah | PTI(P) | 13,917 | 21.41 | 11,212 | 39.01 |
| Swat | PK-8 | Swat-VI | Hamid Ur Rahman | PTI | 33,152 | 47.67 | Jalat | PML(N) | 15,007 | 21.58 | 18,145 | 34.05 |
| Swat | PK-9 | Swat-VII | Sultan e Rum | PTI | 28,525 | 51.09 | Muhib Ullah Khan | PTI-P | 6,913 | 12.38 | 21,612 | 31.67 |
| Swat | PK-10 | Swat-VIII | Muhammad Naeem Khan | PTI | 21,681 | 41.47 | Mahmood Khan | PTI-P | 10,537 | 20.16 | 11,144 | 29.45 |
| Upper Dir | PK-11 | Upper Dir-I | Gul Ibrahim Khan | PTI | 20,130 | 31.35 | Muhammad Ali | JI | 14,533 | 22.63 | 5,597 | 34.12 |
| Upper Dir | PK-12 | Upper Dir-II | Muhammad Yamin | PTI | 23,915 | 37.19 | Azam Khan | JI | 12,531 | 19.48 | 11,384 | 34.45 |
| Upper Dir | PK-13 | Upper Dir-III | Muhammad Anwar Khan | PTI | 32,043 | 42.22 | Inayatullah Khan | JI | 22,457 | 29.59 | 9,586 | 39.84 |
| Lower Dir | PK-14 | Lower Dir-I | Muhammad Azam Khan | PTI | 31,200 | 44.68 | Sahibzada Muhammad Yaqoob | JI | 16,552 | 23.71 | 14,648 | 39.24 |
| Lower Dir | PK-15 | Lower Dir-II | Hamayun Khan | PTI | 31,246 | 41.64 | Naeemullah | PPP | 14,691 | 19.58 | 16,555 | 43.12 |
| Lower Dir | PK-16 | Lower Dir-III | Shafi Ullah | PTI | 31,208 | 41.90 | Shad Nawaz Khan | JI | 11,525 | 15.48 | 19,683 | 44.52 |
| Lower Dir | PK-17 | Lower Dir-IV | Ubaidur Rahman | PTI | 23,229 | 34.90 | Izazul Mulk | JI | 19,990 | 30.04 | 3,239 | 39.75 |
| Lower Dir | PK-18 | Lower Dir-V | Liaqat Ali Khan | PTI | 24,625 | 49.79 | Saeed Gul | JI | 16,059 | 32.47 | 8,566 | 31.15 |
| Bajaur | PK-19 | Bajaur-I | Hamid Ur Rehman | PTI | 23,044 | 44.29 | Khalid Khan | BPP | 13,571 | 26.08 | 9,473 | 29.48 |
| Bajaur | PK-20 | Bajaur-II | Anwar Zeb Khan | PTI | 12,917 | 31.89 | Shahab Uddin Khan | PML(N) | 6,969 | 17.20 | 5,948 | 28.39 |
| Bajaur | PK-21 | Bajaur-III | Ajmal Khan | PTI | 16,712 | 41.96 | Sardar Khan | JI | 8,128 | 20.41 | 8,548 | 25.47 |
| Bajaur | PK-22 (Note: PK-22 election was postponed after independent candidate (Rehan Zeb Khan) was assassinated by ISIS-K. Mubarak Zeb, an independent candidate won the subsequent by-election but then vacated the seat. The ANP won the subsequent by-election.) | Bajaur-IV | Muhammad Nisar | ANP | 11,926 | 26.56 | Najibullah Khan | BPP | 10,622 | 23.66 | 1,304 | 2.91 |
| Malakand | PK-23 | Malakand-I | Shakil Ahmad | PTI | 51,939 | 50.97 | Hamayun Khan | PPP | 23,064 | 22.63 | 28,875 | 42.80 |
| Malakand | PK-24 | Malakand-II | Musavir Khan | PTI | 43,193 | 46.07 | Syed Muhammad Ali Shah Bacha | PPP | 22,191 | 23.67 | 21,002 | 43.59 |
| Buner | PK-25 | Buner-I | Riaz Khan | PTI | 28,490 | 43.80 | Fazli Ghafoor | JUI(F) | 12,702 | 19.53 | 15,788 | 33.25 |
| Buner | PK-26 | Buner-II | Syed Fakhr e Jehan | PTI | 26,782 | 40.00 | Nasir Ali | JI | 15,216 | 22.71 | 11,566 | 38.03 |
| Buner | PK-27 | Buner-III | Abdul Kabir Khan | PTI | 27,821 | 40.34 | Sardar Hussain Babak | ANP | 15,439 | 22.38 | 12,382 | 41.63 |
| Shangla | PK-28 | Shangla-I | Muhammad Rashad Khan | PML(N) | 17,172 | 35.81 | Shaukat Ali Yousafzai | PTI | 11,873 | 24.76 | 5,299 | 32.41 |
| Shangla | PK-29 | Shangla-II | Abdul Munim | PTI | 14,255 | 28.16 | Shaukat Ali | JUI(F) | 13,160 | 26.00 | 1,095 | 31.83 |
| Shangla | PK-30 | Shangla-III | Ibadullah Khan | PML(N) | 14,221 | 32.26 | Sadar ur-Rehman | PTI | 13,863 | 31.45 | 358 | 30.87 |
| Upper Kohistan | PK-31 | Kohistan Upper | Fazal-e Haq | PTI | 14,384 | 38.26 | Satbar Khan | IND | 9,181 | 24.42 | 5,203 | 50.43 |
| Lower Kohistan | PK-32 | Kohistan Lower | Sajjad Ullah | JUI(F) | 13,826 | 33.54 | Khan Member | PTI | 12,496 | 30.32 | 1,330 | 54.68 |
| Kolai-Palas | PK-33 | Kolai Palas | Muhammad Riaz (Pakistani politician) | PTI | 7,118 | 36.72 | Jamaluddin | IND | 3,657 | 18.86 | 3,461 | 45.32 |
| Battagram | PK-34 | Battagram-I | Zubair Khan | PTI | 13,501 | 33.07 | Shah Hussain Khan | JUI(F) | 11,628 | 28.48 | 1,873 | 25.97 |
| Battagram | PK-35 | Battagram-II | Taj Muhammad | PTI | 24,142 | 48.85 | Nawab Zada Wali Muhammad Khan | JUI(F) | 17,340 | 35.09 | 6,802 | 31.10 |
| Mansehra | PK-36 | Mansehra-I | Munir Hussain | PTI | 35,074 | 31.92 | Syed Junaid Al Qasim | PML(N) | 30,414 | 27.68 | 4,660 | 45.24 |
| Mansehra | PK-37 | Mansehra-II | Babar Saleem Swati | PTI | 35,213 | 52.04 | Zahoor Ahmad | PML(N) | 20,950 | 30.96 | 14,263 | 46.75 |
| Mansehra | PK-38 | Mansehra-III | Zahid Chanzeb | PTI | 38,804 | 42.20 | Naeem Sakhi Tanoli | PML(N) | 26,601 | 28.93 | 12,203 | 42.14 |
| Mansehra | PK-39 | Mansehra-IV | Ikram Ullah | PTI | 23,853 | 28.78 | Muhammad Arif | PML(N) | 19,331 | 23.32 | 4,522 | 36.05 |
| Mansehra | PK-40 | Mansehra-V | Shahjahan Yousuf | PML(N) | 44,012 | 43.71 | Abdul Shakoor | PTI | 43,680 | 43.38 | 332 | 43.56 |
| Torghar | PK-41 | Torghar | Laiq Muhammad Khan | PTI | 11,059 | 30.79 | Zareen Gul | ANP | 9,469 | 26.36 | 1,590 | 30.45 |
| Abbottabad | PK-42 | Abbottabad-I | Nazir Ahmed Abbasi | PTI | 35,443 | 35.37 | Sardar Farid Ahmed Khan | PML(N) | 27,623 | 27.57 | 7,820 | 44.79 |
| Abbottabad | PK-43 | Abbottabad-II | Rajab Ali Khan Abbasi | PTI | 41,242 | 35.36 | Muhammad Javed Abbasi | IND | 20,869 | 17.89 | 20,373 | 45.54 |
| Abbottabad | PK-44 | Abbottabad-III | Iftikhar Ahmad Jadoon | PTI | 34,867 | 37.69 | Aurangzeb Nalota | PML(N) | 32,858 | 35.51 | 2,009 | 42.52 |
| Abbottabad | PK-45 | Abbottabad-IV | Mushtaq Ahmed Ghani | PTI | 50,143 | 49.50 | Muhammad Arshad | PML(N) | 27,498 | 27.15 | 22,645 | 45.17 |
| Haripur | PK-46 | Haripur-I | Akbar Ayub Khan | PTI | 68,835 | 57.33 | Qazi Muhammad Asad Khan | IND | 28,327 | 23.59 | 40,508 | 48.18 |
| Haripur | PK-47 | Haripur-II | Arshad Ayub Khan | PTI | 73,038 | 59.31 | Raja Faisal Zaman | PML(N) | 34,620 | 28.11 | 38,418 | 52.30 |
| Haripur | PK-48 | Haripur-III | Malik Adeel Iqbal | PTI | 41,777 | 38.66 | Gohar Nawaz Khan | IND | 21,737 | 20.12 | 20,040 | 49.75 |
| Swabi | PK-49 | Swabi-I | Rangez Ahmad | PTI | 36,692 | 47.41 | Ghafoor Khan Jadoon | JUI(F) | 15,312 | 19.79 | 21,380 | 38.56 |
| Swabi | PK-50 | Swabi-II | Aqibullah Khan | PTI | 40,870 | 44.13 | Babar Khan | PML(N) | 21,089 | 22.77 | 19,781 | 40.81 |
| Swabi | PK-51 | Swabi-III | Abdul Kareem | PTI | 39,653 | 45.91 | Nawabzada | PML(N) | 17,898 | 20.72 | 21,755 | 41.26 |
| Swabi | PK-52 | Swabi-IV | Faisal Khan | PTI | 42,269 | 47.68 | Touseef Ijaz | ANP | 23,317 | 26.30 | 18,952 | 40.56 |
| Swabi | PK-53 | Swabi-V | Murtaza Khan | PTI | 40,825 | 51.31 | Muhammad Zahid | ANP | 20,661 | 25.97 | 20,164 | 37.02 |
| Mardan | PK-54 | Mardan-I | Zarshad Khan | PTI | 42,754 | 52.61 | Gohar Ali Shah | ANP | 17,064 | 21.00 | 25,690 | 43.96 |
| Mardan | PK-55 | Mardan-II | Tufail Anjum | PTI | 41,084 | 44.13 | Adnan Khan | JUI(F) | 28,623 | 30.74 | 12,461 | 45.68 |
| Mardan | PK-56 | Mardan-III | Amir Farzand Khan | PTI | 33,430 | 45.37 | Abdul Aziz | ANP | 16,823 | 22.83 | 16,607 | 40.37 |
| Mardan | PK-57 | Mardan-IV | Muhammad Zahir Shah | PTI | 34,437 | 45.34 | Ahmed Khan Bahadur | ANP | 16,237 | 21.38 | 18,200 | 42.03 |
| Mardan | PK-58 | Mardan-V | Muhammad Abdul Salam | PTI | 38,126 | 46.89 | Haider Khan Hoti | ANP | 26,497 | 32.59 | 11,629 | 38.28 |
| Mardan | PK-59 | Mardan-VI | Tariq Mehmood Aryani | PTI | 28,349 | 38.88 | Muhammad Haroon Khan | ANP | 14,256 | 19.55 | 14,093 | 42.07 |
| Mardan | PK-60 | Mardan-VII | Iftikhar Ali Mushwani | PTI | 29,186 | 35.86 | Sher Afghan Khan | ANP | 15,203 | 18.68 | 13,983 | 44.97 |
| Mardan | PK-61 | Mardan-VIII | Ihtisham Ali | PTI | 32,984 | 38.91 | Jamshaid Khan Mohmand | PML(N) | 20,645 | 24.35 | 12,339 | 46.29 |
| Charsadda | PK-62 | Charsadda-I | Khalid Khan | PTI | 29,402 | 36.89 | Sikandar Hayat Khan Sherpao | QWP | 17,310 | 21.72 | 12,092 | 42.63 |
| Charsadda | PK-63 | Charsadda-II | Arshad Ali | PTI | 35,273 | 43.24 | Shakeel Bashir Khan | ANP | 24,369 | 29.87 | 10,904 | 42.04 |
| Charsadda | PK-64 | Charsadda-III | Iftikhar Ullah Jan | PTI | 39,538 | 43.70 | Sultan Mohammad Khan | ANP | 19,022 | 21.02 | 20,516 | 40.56 |
| Charsadda | PK-65 | Charsadda-IV | Fazle Shakoor Khan | PTI | 43,103 | 49.37 | Muhammad Ahmad Khan | JUI(F) | 18,266 | 20.92 | 24,837 | 38.00 |
| Charsadda | PK-66 | Charsadda-V | Mohammad Arif | PTI | 33,155 | 44.77 | Haji Zafar Ali Khan | JUI(F) | 17,598 | 23.77 | 15,557 | 36.29 |
| Mohmand | PK-67 | Mohmand-I | Mehboob Sher | PTI | 15,127 | 35.47 | Nisar Mohmand | ANP | 7,413 | 17.38 | 7,714 | 31.14 |
| Mohmand | PK-68 | Mohmand-II | Muhammad Israr | PTI | 20,690 | 39.97 | Haneef Ul Zaman | JUI(F) | 12,156 | 23.49 | 8,534 | 24.41 |
| Khyber | PK-69 | Khyber-I | Muhammad Adnan Qadri | PTI | 25,596 | 60.28 | Shafiq Sher Afridi | PML(N) | 10,095 | 23.78 | 15,501 | 21.66 |
| Khyber | PK-70 | Khyber-II | Muhammad Sohail Afridi | PTI | 31,649 | 61.61 | Bilawal Afridi | PML(N) | 7,401 | 14.41 | 24,248 | 26.22 |
| Khyber | PK-71 | Khyber-III | Abdul Ghani | PTI | 15,061 | 36.64 | Khan Wali | JI | 7,903 | 19.23 | 7,158 | 18.18 |
| Peshawar | PK-72 | Peshawar-I | Kiramat Ullah Khan | PPP | 18,527 | 31.63 | Mehmood Jan | PTI | 14,332 | 24.47 | 4,195 | 37.13 |
| Peshawar | PK-73 | Peshawar-II | Arbab Muhammad Wasim Khan | PTI-P | 21,949 | 43.38 | Abdul Haseeb | JUI(F) | 14,752 | 29.15 | 7,197 | 39.61 |
| Peshawar | PK-74 | Peshawar-III | Ijaz Muhammad | JUI(F) | 45,959 | 49.06 | Arbab Jahandad Khan | PTI | 21,817 | 23.28 | 24,142 | 62.20 |
| Peshawar | PK-75 | Peshawar-IV | Arbab Muhammad Usman Khan | ANP | 44,564 | 50.37 | Malik Shahab Hussain | PTI | 26,126 | 29.53 | 18,438 | 64.00 |
| Peshawar | PK-76 | Peshawar-V | Samiullah Khan | PTI | 18,888 | 39.12 | Khush Dil Khan | ANP | 12,986 | 26.90 | 5,902 | 37.62 |
| Peshawar | PK-77 | Peshawar-VI | Sher Ali Afridi | PTI | 30,544 | 56.62 | Sifatullah | JUI(F) | 7,615 | 14.12 | 22,929 | 32.40 |
| Peshawar | PK-78 | Peshawar-VII | Zahir Khan | PML(N) | 22,559 | 35.20 | Zahir Shah | JUI(F) | 7,558 | 11.80 | 15,001 | 44.50 |
| Peshawar | PK-79 | Peshawar-VIII | Jalal Khan | PML(N) | 16,031 | 39.29 | Taimur Khan Jhagra | PTI | 11,495 | 28.17 | 4,536 | 37.98 |
| Peshawar | PK-80 | Peshawar-IX | Arbab Zarak Khan | PPP | 23,311 | 44.31 | Hamid Ul Haq | PTI | 10,251 | 19.49 | 13,060 | 36.19 |
| Peshawar | PK-81 | Peshawar-X | Syed Qasim Ali Shah | PTI | 44,310 | 61.85 | Arslan Khan Nazim | ANP | 8,177 | 11.41 | 36,133 | 35.31 |
| Peshawar | PK-82 | Peshawar-XI | Malik Tariq Awan | PML(N) | 20,334 | 34.09 | Kamran Khan Bangash | PTI | 14,030 | 23.52 | 6,304 | 36.67 |
| Peshawar | PK-83 | Peshawar-XII | Meena Khan | PTI | 38,117 | 38.52 | Samar Haroon Bilour | ANP | 33,500 | 33.85 | 4,617 | 34.88 |
| Peshawar | PK-84 | Peshawar-XIII | Fazal Elahi | PTI | 14,829 | 27.94 | Farhad Khan | ANP | 8,248 | 15.54 | 6,581 | 34.82 |
| Nowshera | PK-85 | Nowshera-I | Zar Alam Khan | PTI | 32,075 | 46.11 | Hamid Ali Khan | ANP | 11,056 | 15.89 | 21,019 | 45.93 |
| Nowshera | PK-86 | Nowshera-II | Muhammad Idrees | PTI | 38,030 | 49.82 | Masood Abbas Khattak | ANP | 12,860 | 16.85 | 25,170 | 47.63 |
| Nowshera | PK-87 | Nowshera-III | Khaliq-ur-Rehman | PTI | 44,762 | 44.47 | Pervez Khattak | PTI-P | 18,176 | 18.05 | 26,586 | 46.01 |
| Nowshera | PK-88 | Nowshera-IV | Mian Muhammad Umar | PTI | 38,384 | 52.16 | Ahad Khattak | JUI(F) | 12,071 | 16.40 | 26,313 | 42.69 |
| Nowshera | PK-89 | Nowshera-V | Ishfaq Ahmed | PTI | 30,416 | 35.95 | Mian Iftikhar Hussain | ANP | 15,630 | 18.47 | 14,786 | 49.91 |
| Kohat | PK-90 | Kohat-I | Aftab Alam Afridi | PTI | 45,358 | 47.22 | Amjad Khan Afridi | PPP | 34,354 | 35.77 | 11,004 | 40.67 |
| Kohat | PK-91 (Note: PK-91 election was postponed as ANP candidate (Asmatullah Khattak) died from a heart attack on 30 January 2024.) | Kohat-II | Daud Shah Afridi | PTI | 23,496 | 42.87 | Imtiaz Shahid | IPP | 16,518 | 30.14 | 6,978 | 24 |
| Kohat | PK-92 | Kohat-III | Shafi Ullah Jan | PTI | 42,254 | 56.87 | Zia Ullah Khan Bangash | PTI-P | 13,609 | 18.32 | 28,645 | 37.69 |
| Hangu | PK-93 | Hangu | Shah Abu Tarab Khan Bangash | PTI | 31,136 | 39.17 | Maulana Tehseenullah | JUI(F) | 16,933 | 21.31 | 14,203 | 24.96 |
| Orakzai | PK-94 | Orakzai | Aurangzeb Khan | PTI | 18,648 | 34.84 | Abdul Rehman | JUI(F) | 8,274 | 14.45 | 10,374 | 24.42 |
| Kurram | PK-95 | Kurram-I | Muhammad Riaz Shaheen | JUI(F) | 29,379 | 51.23 | Imran Khan | PTI | 23,059 | 40.21 | 6,320 | 29.38 |
| Kurram | PK-96 | Kurram-II | Ali Hadi | PTI | 38,593 | 40.26 | Wasi Syed Mian | IND | 24,874 | 25.95 | 13,719 | 45.79 |
| Karak | PK-97 | Karak-I | Muhammad Khurshid | PTI | 51,994 | 46.51 | Nisar Gul | JUI(F) | 21,387 | 19.13 | 30,607 | 43.36 |
| Karak | PK-98 | Karak-II | Muhammad Sajjad | PTI | 37,160 | 36.31 | Malik Qasim Khan Khattak | IND | 31,853 | 31.12 | 5,307 | 46.69 |
| Bannu | PK-99 | Bannu-I | Zahid Ullah Khan | PTI | 27,792 | 45.18 | Sher Azam Khan | JUI(F) | 27,253 | 44.31 | 539 | 37.18 |
| Bannu | PK-100 | Bannu-II | Pakhtoon Yar Khan | PTI | 30,925 | 44.02 | Akram Khan Durrani | JUI(F) | 23,909 | 34.04 | 7,016 | 39.58 |
| Bannu | PK-101 | Bannu-III | Adnan Wazir | JUI(F) | 25,513 | 44.56 | Shah Muhammad Khan | PTI | 21,369 | 37.33 | 4,144 | 36.02 |
| Bannu | PK-102 | Bannu-IV | Akram Khan Durrani | JUI(F) | 39,061 | 44.01 | Haji Malik Adnan Khan | PTI | 35,825 | 40.36 | 3,236 | 42.74 |
| North Waziristan | PK-103 | North Waziristan-I | Muhammad Iqbal Wazir | PTI-P | 24,229 | 33.05 | Asadullah | JUI(F) | 17,723 | 24.18 | 6,506 | 40.76 |
| North Waziristan | PK-104 | North Waziristan-II | Nek Muhammad Khan | PTI | 11,281 | 24.12 | Pir Muhammad Aql Shah | JUI(F) | 10,422 | 22.28 | 859 | 19.66 |
| Lakki Marwat | PK-105 | Lakki Marwat-I | Johar Muhammad | PTI | 36,757 | 42.38 | Munawar Khan | JUI(F) | 26,122 | 30.12 | 10,635 | 52.88 |
| Lakki Marwat | PK-106 | Lakki Marwat-II | Hisham Inamullah Khan | PML(N) | 32,268 | 37.00 | Noor Saleem Malik | PTI | 26,900 | 30.84 | 5,368 | 45.24 |
| Lakki Marwat | PK-107 | Lakki Marwat-III | Tariq Saeed | PTI | 34,400 | 50.49 | Muhammad Fawad Raza Zakori | JUI(F) | 21,679 | 31.82 | 12,721 | 46.61 |
| Tank | PK-108 | Tank | Muhammad Usman | PTI | 42,611 | 49.88 | Mahmood Ahmad Khan | JUI(F) | 30,770 | 36.02 | 11,841 | 39.18 |
| Upper South Waziristan | PK-109 | Upper South Waziristan | Asif Khan | PTI | 11,519 | 34.45 | Saeed Anwar | IND | 7,668 | 22.93 | 3,851 | 11.93 |
| Lower South Waziristan | PK-110 | Lower South Waziristan | Ajab Gul | PTI | 12,525 | 31.03 | Taj Muhammad | IND | 5,354 | 13.26 | 7,171 | 24.07 |
| Dera Ismail Khan | PK-111 | Dera Ismail Khan-I | Makhdoom Zada Muhammad Aftab Haider | JUI(F) | 41,052 | 34.70 | Ehtesham Javed Akber Khan | PTI-P | 37,008 | 31.28 | 4,044 | 60.98 |
| Dera Ismail Khan | PK-112 | Dera Ismail Khan-II | Ahmad Kundi | PPP | 33,312 | 36.00 | Samiullah | JUI(F) | 25,360 | 27.40 | 7,952 | 59.54 |
| Dera Ismail Khan | PK-113 | Dera Ismail Khan-III | Ali Amin Gandapur | PTI | 35,454 | 43.19 | Muhammad Kafeel Ahmad | JUI(F) | 21,885 | 26.66 | 13,569 | 45.25 |
| Dera Ismail Khan | PK-114 | Dera Ismail Khan-IV | Maulana Lutfur Rehman | JUI(F) | 30,291 | 37.92 | Qaizar Khan | PPP | 27,606 | 34.56 | 2,685 | 57.77 |
| Dera Ismail Khan | PK-115 | Dera Ismail Khan-V | Ehsanullah Khan | PPP | 31,861 | 47.70 | Aghaz Ikramullah Gandapur | JUI(F) | 19,865 | 29.74 | 11,996 | 38.39 |

=== Members elected on Reserved seats ===
| Reserved Seats | Party | Members |
|---|---|---|
| For Women | TBA | |
| For Women | JUI(F) | Rehana Ismail |
| For Women | JUI(F) | Amina Aslam |
| For Women | PML(N) | Sobia Shahid |
| For Women | PML(N) | Shehla Bano |
| For Women | PPP | Nelofar Babar |
| For Non-Muslims | TBA | |

== Aftermath ==
After Elections all PTI backed Independents except Ali Amin Khan Gandapur joined Sunni Ittehad Council as per party policy. 2 Independents from PK-82 Peshawar-XI and PK-106 Lakki Marwat-II joined PML(N).

=== Elections for Speaker and Deputy Speaker ===
Babar Saleem Swati and Suraya Bibi elected as Speaker and Deputy Speaker of Khyber Pakhtunkhwa Assembly.

| Candidate | Party | Contesting for | Votes Obtained |
| Required majority → | | | 73 out of 145 |
|---|---|---|---|
| Babar Saleem Swati | PTI-SIC | Speaker | 89 |
| Suraya Bibi | PTI-SIC | Deputy Speaker | 87 |
| Ehsanullah Khan | PPP; PTI-P | Speaker | 17 |
| Arbab Waseem | PPP; PTI-P | Deputy Speaker | 19 |

=== Election for Chief Minister ===
Ali Amin Gandapur elected as Chief Minister of Khyber Pakhtunkhwa of Khyber Pakhtunkhwa by securing 90 votes. He was sworn in Governor House Peshawar day after.

| Candidate | Party | Votes Obtained |
| Required majority → | | 73 out of 145 |
|---|---|---|
| Ali Amin Khan Gandapur | PTI-SIC | 90 |
| Ibadullah Khan | PML(N) | 16 |

== See also ==
- 2024 Pakistan General Election
- 2024 Punjab provincial election
- 2024 Sindh Provincial election
- 2024 Balochistan Provincial election
