= List of members of the 12th Provincial Assembly of Khyber Pakhtunkhwa =

The List of members of the 12th Provincial Assembly of Khyber Pakhtunkhwa represents the elected members of the 12th Provincial Assembly of Khyber Pakhtunkhwa, a legislative body in the Khyber Pakhtunkhwa province of Pakistan.

The assembly was formed after the provincial elections held on February 8, 2024. The first session of this assembly began on February 28, 2024. There are 145 seats in the assembly, including 115 general seats, 22 reserved for women and 3 seats for non-Muslims.

== Elected members ==
12th Assembly of Khyber Pakhtunkhwa
Constituency		Member		Note(s)	Ref
No.	Name	Party	Name of Member	Note(s)	Ref
PK-1	Upper Chitral	SIC	Suraya Bibi		
PK-2	Lower Chitral	SIC	Fateh-ul-Mulk Ali Nasir		
PK-3	Swat-I	SIC	Sharafat Ali		
PK-4	Swat-II	SIC	Ali Shah		
PK-5	Swat-III	SIC	Akhtar Khan		
PK-6	Swat-IV	SIC	Fazal Hakim		
PK-7	Swat-V	SIC	Amjad Ali		
PK-8	Swat-VI	SIC	Hamid Ur Rahman		
PK-9	Swat-VII	SIC	Sultan e Rum		
PK-10	Swat-VIII	SIC	Muhammad Naeem Khan		
PK-11	Upper Dir-I	SIC	Gul Ibrahim Khan		
PK-12	Upper Dir-II	SIC	Muhammad Yamin		
PK-13	Upper Dir-III	SIC	Muhammad Anwar Khan		
PK-14	Lower Dir-I	SIC	Muhammad Azam Khan		
PK-15	Lower Dir-II	SIC	Hamayun Khan		
PK-16	Lower Dir-III	SIC	Shafi Ullah		
PK-17	Lower Dir-IV	SIC	Ubaidur Rahman		
PK-18	Lower Dir-V	SIC	Liaqat Ali Khan		
PK-19	Bajaur-I	SIC	Hamid Ur Rehman		
PK-20	Bajaur-II	SIC	Anwar Zeb Khan		
PK-21	Bajaur-III	SIC	Ajmal Khan		
PK-22	Bajaur-IV	ANP	Nisar Baaz		
PK-23	Malakand-I	SIC	Shakeel Ahmad		
PK-24	Malakand-II	SIC	Musavir Khan		
PK-25	Buner-I	SIC	Riaz Khan		
PK-26	Buner-II	SIC	Syed Fakhr e Jehan		
PK-27	Buner-III	SIC	Abdul Kabir Khan		
PK-28	Shangla-I	PML(N)	Muhammad Rashad Khan		
PK-29	Shangla-II	SIC	Abdul Munim		
PK-30	Shangla-III	PML(N)	Ibadullah Khan		
PK-31	Kohistan Upper	SIC	Fazal-e Haq		
PK-32	Kohistan Lower	JUI(F)	Sajjad Ullah		
PK-33	Kolai Palas	SIC	Muhammad Riaz		
PK-34	Battagram-I	SIC	Zubair Khan		
PK-35	Battagram-II	SIC	Taj Muhammad		
PK-36	Mansehra-I	SIC	Munir Hussain		
PK-37	Mansehra-II	SIC	Babar Saleem Swati		
PK-38	Mansehra-III	SIC	Zahid Chanzeb		
PK-39	Mansehra-IV	SIC	Ikram Ullah		
PK-40	Mansehra-V	PML(N)	Shahjahan Yousuf		
PK-41	Torghar	SIC	Laiq Muhammad Khan		
PK-42	Abbottabad-I	SIC	Nazir Ahmed Abbasi		
PK-43	Abbottabad-II	SIC	Rajab Ali Khan Abbasi		
PK-44	Abbottabad-III	SIC	Iftikhar Ahmad Khan Jadoon		
PK-45	Abbottabad-IV	SIC	Mushtaq Ahmed Ghani		
PK-46	Haripur-I	SIC	Akbar Ayub Khan		
PK-47	Haripur-II	SIC	Arshad Ayub Khan		
PK-48	Haripur-III	SIC	Malik Adeel Iqbal		
PK-49	Swabi-I	SIC	Rangez Ahmad		
PK-50	Swabi-II	SIC	Aqibullah Khan		
PK-51	Swabi-III	SIC	Abdul Kareem		
PK-52	Swabi-IV	SIC	Faisal Khan Tarakai		
PK-53	Swabi-V	SIC	Murtaza Khan Tarakai		
PK-54	Mardan-I	SIC	Zarshad Khan		
PK-55	Mardan-II	SIC	Tufail Anjum		
PK-56	Mardan-III	SIC	Amir Farzand Khan		
PK-57	Mardan-IV	SIC	Muhammad Zahir Shah		
PK-58	Mardan-V	SIC	Muhammad Abdul Salam		
PK-59	Mardan-VI	SIC	Tariq Mehmood Aryani		
PK-60	Mardan-VII	SIC	Iftikhar Ali Mushwani		
PK-61	Mardan-VIII	SIC	Ihtisham Ali		
PK-62	Charsadda-I	SIC	Khalid Khan		
PK-63	Charsadda-II	SIC	Arshad Ali		
PK-64	Charsadda-III	SIC	Iftikhar Ullah Jan		
PK-65	Charsadda-IV	SIC	Fazle Shakoor Khan		
PK-66	Charsadda-V	SIC	Mohammad Arif		
PK-67	Mohmand-I	SIC	Mehboob Sher		
PK-68	Mohmand-II	SIC	Muhammad Israr		
PK-69	Khyber-I	SIC	Muhammad Adnan Qadri		
PK-70	Khyber-II	SIC	Sohail Afridi		
PK-71	Khyber-III	SIC	Abdul Ghani		
PK-72	Peshawar-I	PPP	Kiramat Ullah Khan		
PK-73	Peshawar-II	PTI-P	Arbab Muhammad Wasim Khan		
PK-74	Peshawar-III	JUI(F)	Ijaz Muhammad		
PK-75	Peshawar-IV	ANP	Arbab Muhammad Usman Khan		
PK-76	Peshawar-V	SIC	Samiullah Khan		
PK-77	Peshawar-VI	SIC	Sher Ali Afridi		
PK-78	Peshawar-VII	PML(N)	Zahir Khan		
PK-79	Peshawar-VIII	PML(N)	Jalal Khan		
PK-80	Peshawar-IX	PPP	Arbab Zarak Khan		
PK-81	Peshawar-X	SIC	Syed Qasim Ali Shah		
PK-82	Peshawar-XI	PML(N)	Malik Tariq Awan		
PK-83	Peshawar-XII	SIC	Meena Khan		
PK-84	Peshawar-XIII	SIC	Fazal Elahi		
PK-85	Nowshera-I	SIC	Zar Alam Khan		
PK-86	Nowshera-II	SIC	Muhammad Idrees		
PK-87	Nowshera-III	SIC	Khaliq-ur-Rehman		
PK-88	Nowshera-IV	SIC	Mian Muhammad Umar		
PK-89	Nowshera-V	SIC	Ishfaq Ahmed		
PK-90	Kohat-I	SIC	Aftab Alam Afridi		
PK-91	Kohat-II	SIC	Daud Shah Afridi		
PK-92	Kohat-III	SIC	Shafi Ullah Jan		
PK-93	Hangu	SIC	Shah Abu Tarab Khan Bangash		
PK-94	Orakzai	SIC	Aurangzeb Khan		
PK-95	Kurram-I	JUI(F)	Muhammad Riaz Shaheen		
PK-96	Kurram-II	PTI-P	Ali Hadi		
PK-97	Karak-I	SIC	Muhammad Khurshid		
PK-98	Karak-II	SIC	Muhammad Sajjad		
PK-99	Bannu-I	SIC	Zahid Ullah Khan		
PK-100	Bannu-II	SIC	Pakhtoon Yar Khan		
PK-101	Bannu-III	JUI(F)	Adnan Wazir		
PK-102	Bannu-IV	JUI(F)	Akram Khan Durrani		
PK-103	North Waziristan-I	PTI-P	Muhammad Iqbal Wazir		
PK-104	North Waziristan-II	SIC	Nek Muhammad Khan		
PK-105	Lakki Marwat-I	SIC	Johar Muhammad		
PK-106	Lakki Marwat-II	PML(N)	Hisham Inamullah Khan		
PK-107	Lakki Marwat-III	SIC	Tariq Saeed		
PK-108	Tank	SIC	Muhammad Usman		
PK-109	Upper South Waziristan	SIC	Asif Khan		
PK-110	Lower South Waziristan	SIC	Ajab Gul		
PK-111	Dera Ismail Khan-I	JUI(F)	Makhdoom Zada Muhammad Aftab Haider		
PK-112	Dera Ismail Khan-II	PPP	Ahmad Kundi		
PK-113	Dera Ismail Khan-III	SIC	Ali Amin Gandapur		
PK-114	Dera Ismail Khan-IV	JUI(F)	Luftur Rehman		
PK-115	Dera Ismail Khan-V	PPP	Ehsanullah Khan		
Reserved	For Women				
Reserved	For Non-Muslims				
