= Hazara Division =

Administrative division of Khyber Pakhtunkhwa, Pakistan

Hazara Division ہزارہ ڈویژن هزاره څانګه
- Division
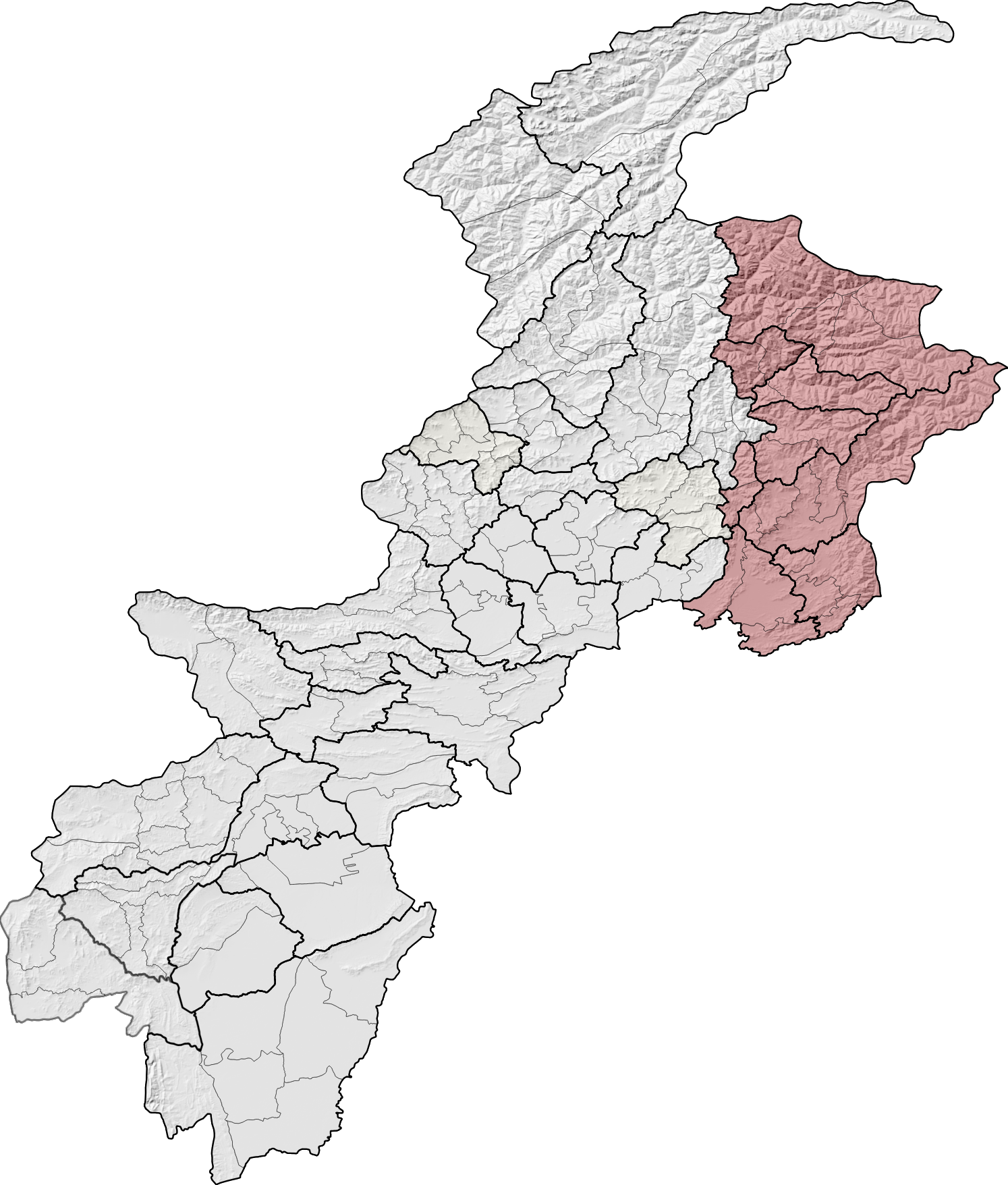
- Hazara Division (red) in Khyber Pakhtunkhwa
- Country: Pakistan
- Province: Khyber Pakhtunkhwa
- Headquarters: Abbottabad
- Districts: 9

Government
  - Type: Divisional Administration
  - Commissioner: Aamir Sultan Tareen (BPS-20 PAS)
  - Regional police officer: Tahir Ayub Khan (BPS-20 PSP)

Area
  - Division: 17,064 km^{2} (6,588 sq mi)

Population (2023)
  - Division: 6,188,736
  - Density: 362.68/km^{2} (939.33/sq mi)
  - Urban: 634,914 (10.26%)
  - Rural: 5,553,822 (89.74%)

Native Speakers
  - Speakers: Largest: Hindko (55.99%); Others: Pashto (20.69%)

Literacy
  - Literacy rate: Total: (60.95%); Male: (71.42 %); Female: (50.33 %)
- Time zone: UTC+5 (PST)
- Area code: CNIC: 13
- Website: chd.kp.gov.pk

Hazara Division, located along the Indus River in Pakistan's Khyber Pakhtunkhwa province, serves as an administrative region of the province, encompassing nine districts: Abbottabad, Allai District, Battagram, Haripur, Kolai-Palas, Lower Kohistan, Mansehra, Torghar, and Upper Kohistan.

== Location ==
Hazara Division is located in the east of Khyber Pakhtunkhwa province - to the west it is bordered by Malakand and Mardan divisions of the province - to the south it is bordered by the Rawalpindi Division of Punjab and Islamabad Capital Territory, to the east by Azad Kashmir and to the north by Gilgit-Baltistan.

== History ==
During the colonial era Hazara Division (then Hazara District) had been part of Peshawar Division and was made up of three tehsils namely Haripur, Mansehra and Abbottabad - following the dissolution of West Pakistan in 1970, Hazara District and the two tribal agencies were merged to create the new Hazara Division, with Abbottabad designated as its capital. Initially, the division comprised two districts: Abbottabad and Mansehra. Over the next few years, administrative changes led to the creation of two additional districts—Haripur was carved out of Abbottabad District, and Batagram was separated from Mansehra District.

Hazara functioned as a district until 1976, when it was formally upgraded to a division. In October of that year, Mansehra was granted full district status, encompassing the tehsils of Mansehra and Batagram. Later, in July 1991, Haripur Tehsil was separated from Abbottabad and established as an independent district. This left only the original Abbottabad Tehsil, which then officially became Abbottabad District.

In 2000, Pakistan abolished its administrative divisions, elevating districts to serve as the new third tier of government. At the time of abolition, Hazara Division consisted of eight districts.

However, in 2008, administrative divisions were reinstated, and Hazara Division was formally re-established.

Hazara Division Administrative Timeline with Tehsil Details
Year	Event	Tehsil Details
1970	Hazara District and two tribal agencies merged to form Hazara Division (capital: Abbottabad)	Hazara District included Abbottabad, Mansehra, and Haripur tehsils
1970s	Haripur District created from Abbottabad; Batagram District created from Mansehra	Haripur Tehsil became Haripur District; Batagram Tehsil separated from Mansehra
1976	Hazara formally upgraded to division status; Mansehra becomes a full district	Mansehra District comprised Mansehra and Batagram tehsils
1991	Haripur Tehsil separated from Abbottabad and made into a district	Abbottabad Tehsil was then split into Havelian and Abbottabad tehsils forming the tehsils of Abbottabad District
2000	Administrative divisions abolished; Hazara Division dissolved	Districts functioned independently; tehsil structure remained intact
2008	Administrative divisions reinstated; Hazara Division restored	Hazara Division included Abbottabad, Mansehra, Haripur, Batagram, and later Kohistan and Torghar districts

== Demographics ==
=== Population ===
According to the 2023 census, Hazara Division had a population of 6,188,736 roughly equal to the nation of Bulgaria or the US state of Missouri.

Historical population
Year	Pop.	±% p.a.
1951	...	—
1961	...	—
1972	...	—
1981	2,701,257	—
1998	3,505,581	+1.54%
2017	5,325,121	+2.22%
2023	6,188,736	+2.54%

The increase in population from 1981 to 2023 was 129.1% equivalent to an average increase of approximately 1.96% per annum.

== List of the Districts ==
Hazara Division contains the following districts:

- Abbottabad District
- Allai District (part of Mansehra District until 1993 and part of Battagram District from 1993 to 2023)
- Batagram District (part of Mansehra District until 1993)
- Haripur District
- Kolai-Palas District
- Upper Kohistan District (part of Mansehra District until 1993 and Kohistan District until 2014)
- Lower Kohistan District (part of Mansehra District until 1993 and Kohistan District until 2014)
- Mansehra District
- Torghar District (part of Mansehra District until 2011)

#	District	Headquarter	Area (km^{2})	Pop. (2023)	Density (ppl/km^{2}) (2023)	Lit. rate (2023)
1	Abbottabad	Abbottabad	1,967	1,419,072	721.6	77.34%
2	Allai	Allai Valley	521	N/A	N/A	N/A
3	Battagram	Battagram	1,301	554,133	425.9	39.09%
4	Haripur	Haripur	1,725	1,174,783	681.3	74.88%
5	Kolai Palas	Kolai	1,410	280,162	198.7	18.80%
6	Lower Kohistan	Pattan	642	340,017	529.5	22.05%
7	Mansehra	Mansehra	4,125	1,797,177	435.6	63.79%
8	Torghar	Judba	454	200,445	441.6	29.74%
9	Upper Kohistan	Dasu	5,440	422,947	77.8	19.05%

== List of the Tehsils ==
The following are a list of tehsils in Hazara Division along with their respective districts.

#	Tehsil	Area (km^{2})	Pop. (2023)	Density (ppl/km^{2}) (2023)	Lit. rate (2023)	Districts
1	Abbottabad Tehsil	1,285	1,003,339	101.76		Abbottabad
2	Havelian Tehsil	342	256,754	98.8		Abbottabad
3	Lora Tehsil	187	98,717	97.22		Abbottabad
4	Lower Tanawal Tehsil	153	60,262	98.88		Abbottabad
5	Allai Tehsil	804	218,149	271.33		Batagram
6	Batagram Tehsil	497	335,984	676.02		Batagram
7	Ghazi Tehsil	595	151,839	255.19		Haripur
8	Haripur Tehsil	834	836,058	1,002.47		Haripur
9	Khanpur Tehsil	296	186,886	631.37		Haripur
10	Bataira / Kolai	170	142,660	839.18		Kolai-Palas
11	Palas	1,240	137,502	110.89		Kolai-Palas
12	Bankad Tehsil	331	205,851	621.91		Lower Kohistan
13	Pattan Tehsil	311	134,166	431.4		Lower Kohistan
14	Baffa Pakhal	640	460,090	718.89		Mansehra
15	Bala Kot Tehsil	2,376	310,339	130.61		Mansehra
16	Darband Tehsil	102	51,702	506.88		Mansehra
17	Mansehra Tehsil	700	723,325	1,033.32		Mansehra
18	Oghi Tehsil	307	251,721	819.94		Mansehra
19	Tanawal Tehsil					Mansehra
20	Daur Maira Tehsil	86	50,503	587.24		Torghar
21	Judba Tehsil	63	63,083	1,001.32		Torghar
22	Khander Hassanzai Tehsil	305	86,859	284.78		Torghar
23	Dassu Tehsil	1,958	148,914	76.05		Upper Kohistan
24	Harban Basha Tehsil					Upper Kohistan
25	Kandia Tehsil	1,926	165,232	85.79		Upper Kohistan
26	Seo Tehsil	258	59,557	230.84		Upper Kohistan

== Constituencies ==
Provincial Assembly Constituency	National Assembly Constituency	District
PK-31 Kohistan Upper	NA-12 Kohistan-cum-Lower Kohistan-cum-Kolai Palas Kohistan	Upper Kohistan
PK-32 Kohistan Lower	NA-12 Kohistan-cum-Lower Kohistan-cum-Kolai Palas Kohistan	Lower Kohistan
PK-33 Kolai Palas	NA-12 Kohistan-cum-Lower Kohistan-cum-Kolai Palas Kohistan	Kolai-Palas
PK-34 Battagram-I	NA-13 Battagram	Battagram
PK-35 Battagram-II	NA-13 Battagram	Battagram
PK-36 Mansehra-I	NA-14 Mansehra	Mansehra
PK-37 Mansehra-II	NA-14 Mansehra	Mansehra
PK-38 Mansehra-III	NA-15 Mansehra-cum-Torghar	Mansehra
PK-39 Mansehra-IV	NA-15 Mansehra-cum-Torghar	Mansehra
PK-40 Mansehra-V	NA-15 Mansehra-cum-Torghar	Mansehra
PK-41 Torghar	NA-15 Mansehra-cum-Torghar	Torghar
PK-42 Abbottabad-I	NA-16 Abbottabad-I	Abbottabad
PK-43 Abbottabad-II	NA-16 Abbottabad-I	Abbottabad
PK-44 Abbottabad-III	NA-17 Abbottabad-II	Abbottabad
PK-45 Abbottabad-IV	NA-17 Abbottabad-II	Abbottabad
PK-46 Haripur-I	NA-18 Haripur	Haripur
PK-47 Haripur-II	NA-18 Haripur	Haripur
PK-48 Haripur-III	NA-18 Haripur	Haripur

== See also ==
- Hazara
- Divisions of Khyber Pakhtunkhwa
