= Peshawar Division =

Administrative division of Khyber Pakhtunkhwa, Pakistan

Coordinates: 34°00′N 72°00′E

Peshawar Division پشاور ڈویژن پېښور څانګه
- Division
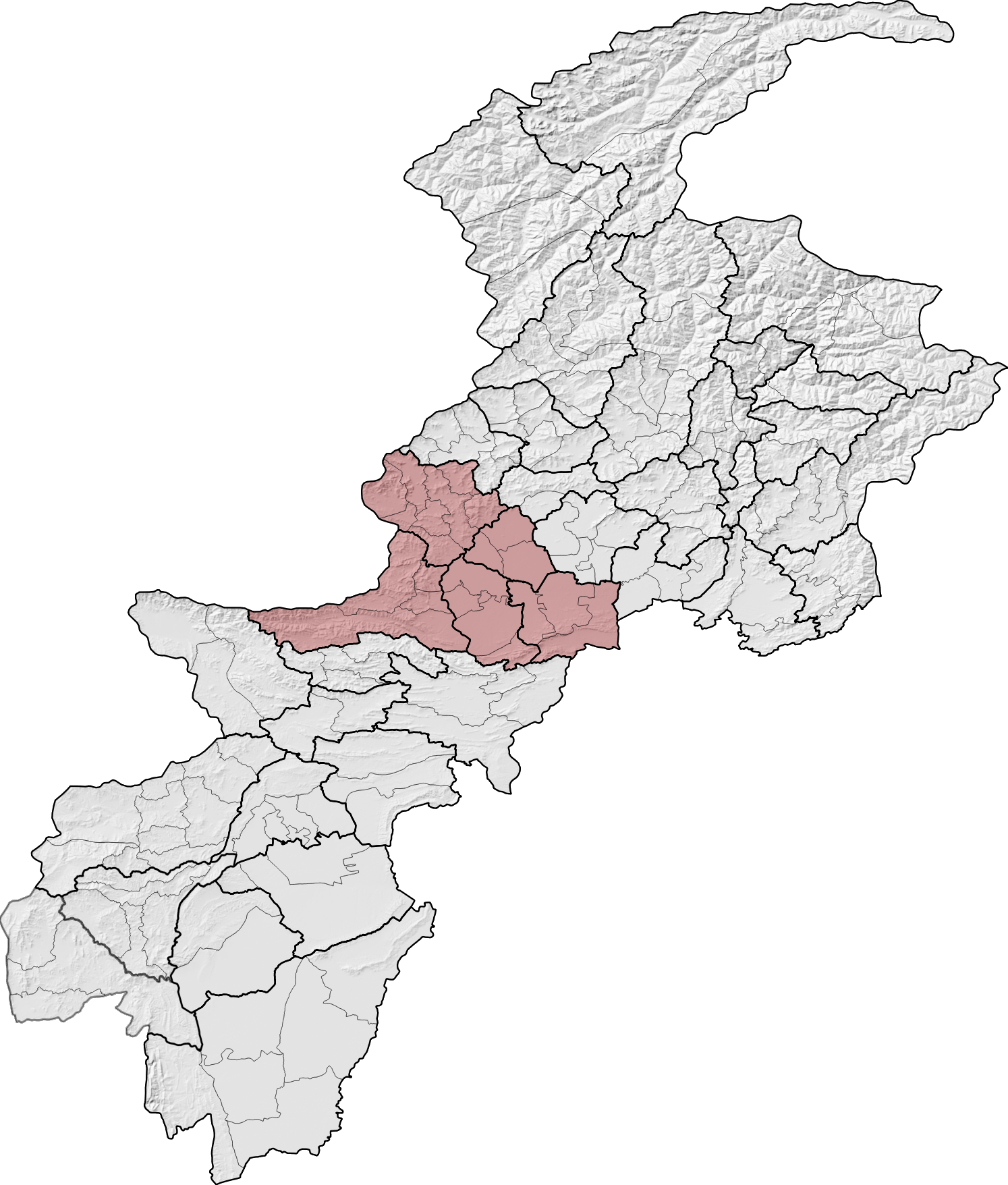
- Peshawar Division (red) in Khyber Pakhtunkhwa
- Country: Pakistan
- Province: Khyber Pakhtunkhwa
- Capital: Peshawar

Government
  - Type: Divisional Administration
  - Mayor: Zubair Khan (JUI-F)
  - Commissioner: Riaz Khan Mehsud (BPS-20 PCS)
  - Capital City Police Officer: Syed Ashfaq Anwar (BPS-20 PSP)

Area
  - Division: 4,001 km^{2} (1,545 sq mi)

Population (2023)
  - Division: 10,035,171
  - Density: 2,508/km^{2} (6,496/sq mi)
  - Urban: 2,635,067 (26.26%)
  - Rural: 7,400,104 (73.74%)

Language Speakers
  - Speakers: Largest: Pashto (95.75%); Others: Hindko (2.19%)

Literacy
  - Literacy rate: Total: (51.32%); Male: (64.20 %); Female: (37.71%)
- Website: cpd.kp.gov.pk

Peshawar Division is an administrative division of Khyber Pakhtunkhwa Province, Pakistan. It was abolished in the reforms of 2000, like all divisions, but reinstated in 2008. At independence in 1947, the Khyber Pakhtunkhwa (then North-West Frontier Province) was split into two divisions, Dera Ismail Khan and Peshawar. Until 1976, Peshawar Division contained the districts of Hazara and Kohat, when they both became divisions themselves. Later in the mid-1990s, the district of Mardan (and its tehsils) also became a division itself. CNIC code of Peshawar Division is 17.

== List of the Districts ==
#	District	Headquarter	Area (km²)	Pop. (2023)	Density (ppl/km²) (2023)	Lit. rate (2023)
1	Charsadda	Charsadda	996	1,835,504	1,843.1	53.94%
2	Khyber	Landi Kotal	2,576	1,146,267	445.0	38.45%
3	Nowshera	Nowshera	1,748	1,740,705	995.8	56.78%
4	Peshawar	Peshawar	1,518	4,758,762	3,135.6	53.28%
5	Mohmand	Ghalanai	2,296	553,933	241.2	31.28%

== List of the Tehsils ==
#	Tehsil	Area (km²)	Pop. (2023)	Density (ppl/km²) (2023)	Lit. rate (2023)	Districts
1	Charsadda Tehsil	445	909,438	2,043.68		Charsadda District
2	Shabqadar Tehsil	204	440,524	2,159.43		Charsadda District
3	Tangi Tehsil	347	485,542	1,399.26		Charsadda District
4	Bagh Maidan Tehsil					Khyber District
5	Bara Tehsil	1,430	548,084	383.28		Khyber District
6	Bazar Zakha Khel Tehsil					Khyber District
7	Fort Salop Tehsil					Khyber District
8	Jamrud Tehsil	311	243,290	782.28		Khyber District
9	Landi Kotal Tehsil	679	312,313	459.96		Khyber District
10	Mula Gori Tehsil	156	42,580	272.95		Khyber District
11	Painda Cheena Tehsil					Khyber District
12	Ambar Utman Khel Tehsil	273	79,455	291.04		Mohmand District
13	Halim Zai Tehsil	211	89,149	422.51		Mohmand District
14	Pindiali Tehsil	454	112,247	247.24		Mohmand District
15	Pran Ghar Tehsil	257	36,046	140.26		Mohmand District
16	Safi Tehsil	322	109,620	340.43		Mohmand District
17	Upper Mohmand (Baizai) Tehsil]]	513	63,659	124.09		Mohmand District
18	Yake Ghund Tehsil	266	63,757	239.69		Mohmand District
19	Jehangira Tehsil	718	434,984	100.72		Nowshera District
20	Nowshera Tehsil	679	796,226	106.39		Nowshera District
21	Pabbi Tehsil	351	509,495	102.42		Nowshera District
22	Badbher Tehsil	357	439,912	1,232.25		Peshawar District
23	Chamkani Tehsil	226	624,354	2,762.63		Peshawar District
24	Hassan Khel Tehsil	261	72,557	278		Peshawar District
25	Mathra Tehsil	218	495,059	2,270.91		Peshawar District
26	Peshawar City Tehsil	176	2,113,596	12,009.07		Peshawar District
27	Peshtakhara Tehsil	135	480,436	3,558.79		Peshawar District
28	Shah Alam Tehsil	145	532,848	3,674.81		Peshawar District

== Demographics ==
Historical population
Year	Pop.	±% p.a.
1951	...	—
1961	...	—
1972	...	—
1981	2,281,752	—
1998	3,923,588	+3.24%
2017	7,403,817	+3.40%
2023	10,035,171	+5.20%

According to the 2023 census, Peshawar Division had a population of 10,035,171 roughly equal to the nation of Portugal or the US state of Michigan or Chinese province of Liaoning.

Religious groups in Peshawar Division (British North-West Frontier Province era)
Religious group	1881		1891		1901		1911		1921		1931		1941	
Religious group	Pop.	%	Pop.	%	Pop.	%	Pop.	%	Pop.	%	Pop.	%	Pop.	%
Islam	546,117	92.14%	654,443	92.99%	732,870	92.92%	807,788	93.38%	836,222	92.16%	898,683	92.24%	769,589	90.35%
Hinduism	39,321	6.63%	35,417	5.03%	40,183	5.09%	35,367	4.09%	48,144	5.31%	42,321	4.34%	51,212	6.01%
Christianity	4,088	0.69%	4,742	0.67%	4,288	0.54%	5,604	0.65%	7,652	0.84%	8,974	0.92%	6,890	0.81%
Sikhism	3,103	0.52%	9,125	1.3%	11,318	1.44%	16,196	1.87%	15,326	1.69%	24,271	2.49%	24,030	2.82%
Zoroastrianism	39	0.01%	37	0.01%	46	0.01%	49	0.01%	20	0%	59	0.01%	24	0%
Jainism	3	0%	0	0%	0	0%	4	0%	3	0%	0	0%	0	0%
Buddhism	0	0%	0	0%	0	0%	0	0%	0	0%	2	0%	18	0%
Judaism	—N/a	—N/a	4	0%	2	0%	1	0%	0	0%	11	0%	70	0.01%
Others	3	0%	0	0%	0	0%	0	0%	0	0%	0	0%	0	0%
Total population	592,674	100%	703,768	100%	788,707	100%	865,009	100%	907,367	100%	974,321	100%	851,833	100%
Note: British North-West Frontier Province era figures are for Peshawar District, which roughly corresponds to present-day Peshawar Division.

== Constituencies ==
Provincial Assembly Constituency	National Assembly Constituency	District
PK-62 Charsadda-I	NA-24 Charsadda-I	Charsadda
PK-66 Charsadda-V	NA-24 Charsadda-I	Charsadda
PK-63 Charsadda-II	NA-25 Charsadda-II	Charsadda
PK-65 Charsadda-IV	NA-25 Charsadda-II	Charsadda
PK-64 Charsadda-III	NA-25 Charsadda-II	Charsadda
PK-67 Mohmand-I	NA-26 Mohmand	Mohmand
PK-68 Mohmand-II	NA-26 Mohmand	Mohmand
PK-69 Khyber-I	NA-27 Khyber	Khyber
PK-70 Khyber-II	NA-27 Khyber	Khyber
PK-71 Khyber-III	NA-27 Khyber	Khyber
PK-72 Peshawar-I	NA-28 Peshawar-I	Peshawar
PK-73 Peshawar-II	NA-28 Peshawar-I	Peshawar
PK-74 Peshawar-III	NA-28 Peshawar-I	Peshawar
PK-75 Peshawar-IV	NA-29 Peshawar-II	Peshawar
PK-76 Peshawar-V	NA-29 Peshawar-II	Peshawar
PK-77 Peshawar-VI	NA-30 Peshawar-III	Peshawar
PK-78 Peshawar-VII	NA-30 Peshawar-III	Peshawar
PK-79 Peshawar-VIII	NA-31 Peshawar-IV	Peshawar
PK-80 Peshawar-IX	NA-31 Peshawar-IV	Peshawar
PK-81 Peshawar-X	NA-31 Peshawar-IV	Peshawar
PK-82 Peshawar-XI	NA-32 Peshawar-V	Peshawar
PK-83 Peshawar-XII	NA-32 Peshawar-V	Peshawar
PK-84 Peshawar-XIII	NA-32 Peshawar-V	Peshawar
PK-85 Nowshera-I	NA-33 Nowshera-I	Nowshera
PK-86 Nowshera-II	NA-33 Nowshera-I	Nowshera
PK-87 Nowshera-III	NA-33 Nowshera-I	Nowshera
PK-88 Nowshera-IV	NA-34 Nowshera-II	Nowshera
PK-89 Nowshera-V	NA-34 Nowshera-II	Nowshera

== See also ==
- Hazara Division
- Kohat Division
- Mardan Division
