= Abdul Khel, Peshawar =

Abdul Khel عبدل خیل
- Location within Pakistan
- Coordinates: 33.91°N 70.90°E
- Country: Pakistan
- Territory: Federally Administered Tribal Areas
- Elevation: 1,329 m (4,360 ft)
- Time zone: UTC+5 (PST)
  - Summer (DST): UTC+6 (PDT)

Abdul Khel (Urdu: عبدل خیل) is a town of Khyber District in the Peshawar Division of Pakistan. It is located at 33°54'46N 70°54'9E with an altitude of 1329 metres (4363 feet).
