= Ayub Kaley =

Ayub Kaley is a village in Khyber District in the Peshawar Division of Khyber Pakhtunkhwa province, Pakistan. It is located on the Khyber Pass, the highway that links Kabul and Peshawar. In 2002 angry tribesmen installed anti aircraft guns in the area in a dispute with government.
