= Khush Dil Khan =

Pakistani politician

Member of the Provincial Assembly of Khyber Pakhtunkhwa
- In office 13 August 2018 – 18 January 2023
- Constituency: PK-70 (Peshawar-V)
- In office 20 March 2008 – 20 March 2013
- Constituency: PK-10 (Peshawar-X)

Deputy Speaker of the Provincial Assembly of Khyber Pakhtunkhwa
- In office 29 March 2008 – 20 March 2013
- Preceded by: Ikramullah Shahid
- Succeeded by: Imtiaz Shahid
- Speaker: Kiramat Ullah Khan

Personal details
- Party: PTI-P (2025-present)
- Other political affiliations: ANP (2008-2025)

Khush Dil Khan is a Pakistani politician who was the member of the Provincial Assembly of Khyber Pakhtunkhwa from March 2008 to March 2013 and from August 2018 to January 2023. He is the provincial Senior Vice President of the Awami National Party. He has also been the Deputy Speaker of the Provincial Assembly of Khyber Pakhtunkhwa from March 2008 to March 2013.
