= Meher Taj Roghani =

Pakistani politician

MPA Dr. Meher Taj Roghani

Pakistani Senator for Khyber Pakthunkhwa
- In office 12 March 2018 – 12 March 2024
- Constituency: Khyber Pakhtunkhwa

Deputy Speaker of the Khyber Pakhtunkhwa Assembly
- In office 11 December 2015 – 28 May 2018
- Governor: Iqbal Zafar Jhagra (2016–); Mehtab Abbasi (2013–2016)
- Preceded by: Imtiaz Shahid
- Succeeded by: Mehmood Jan

Member of the Khyber Pakhtunkhwa Assembly
- In office 31 May 2013 – 28 May 2018
- Constituency: WR-02

Personal details
- Born: 14 April 1942 (age 83) Mardan, Khyber Pakhtunkhwa, Pakistan
- Other political affiliations: PTI (2013-2018)
- Occupation: Doctor, politician

Dr. Meher Taj Roghani (Urdu: مہر تاج روغانی; born 14 April 1942) is a Pakistani politician hailing from Mardan, and is currently serving as a Pakistan Tehreek-e-Insaf Senator for Khyber Pakthunkhwa. Roghani served as Deputy Speaker of the 10th Khyber Pakhtunkhwa Assembly. She also served as a member and Committee Chairperson of the different committees. She is also served as Minister for Health and Special Advisor to the Chief Minister of Khyber Pakhtunkhwa on Social Welfare and Women's Empowerment. She is the first woman Deputy Speaker of the Khyber Pakhtunkhwa Assembly.

== Political career ==
In April 2019, she was unanimously elected as Chairperson of the Parliamentary Committee on Appointment of the Chairperson of the National Commission on the Status of Women (NCSW).

During her farewell speech in March 2024, Roghani called for austerity measures in government, including the elimination of free petrol, electricity, and other perks for high-ranking officials.

== Philanthropy ==
In 2019, Roghani donated land in Mardan which became the site of the Rehmat Maroof Saqib Roghani Hospital, a primary eye-care facility serving Sawaldher and surrounding areas.

== Education and career ==
Dr. Roghani holds the degrees of MBBS (Khyber Medical College) from Pakistan, DCH from Glasgow, FCPS (Hons) from Pakistan and MRCP from Ireland.
