= Shah Muhammad Khan =

Pakistani politician

Shah Muhammad Khan شاہ محمد خان

Member of Khyber Pakhtunkhwa Assembly
- In office 13 August 2018 – 18 January 2023
- Constituency: PK-89 (Bannu-III)
- In office 29 May 2013 – 31 May 2018
- Constituency: PK-72 (Bannu-III)

Personal details
- Born: Bannu, Khyber-Pakhtunkhwa, Pakistan
- Party: PTI-P (2025-present)
- Other political affiliations: PTI (2018-2025)

Shah Muhammad Khan is Pakistani politician. He had been a member of the Provincial Assembly of Khyber Pakhtunkhwa from May 2013 to May 2018 and from August 2018 to January 2023. He belongs to Narmi Khel tribe of Baka Khel - a sub group of Utmanzai Wazir, Bannu. He is a member of the Pakistan Tehreek-e-Insaf.

== Political career ==
Shah Muhammad won the PK-72 Bannu-III provincial assembly seat in the elections of 2013 as an independent candidate and later on joined Pakistan Tehreek-e-Insaf and was appointed as special assistant on transport and mass transit, and was re-elected to PK-89 (Bannu-III) in 2018. He was selected as provincial minister of transport in January 2020.

In February 2022, Khan was disqualified from public office for five years by the Election Commission of Pakistan. The Islamabad High Court later overturned the election commission's decision.

== Bomb attack accusation ==
Former Chief Minister Akram Khan Durrani accused Malik Shah Muhammad Khan in a bombing incident which he was proved clear later by court.

== Sino Pak International Logistic Complex ==
Shah Muhammad Khan Wazir headed the 25-member forum from KPk that departed for China on June 17, 2016 to participate in the commencement ceremony of Sino Pak International Logistic Complex (SPIL) in China. SPIL was launched in order to build a modern land logistic system and advance the infrastructure construction process for the “China Pakistan Economic Corridor”.
