= Adnan Wazir =

Pakistani politician

Member of the Provincial Assembly of Khyber Pakhtunkhwa
- Incumbent
- Assumed office 29 February 2024
- Constituency: PK-101 Bannu-III

Personal details
- Born: Bannu District, Khyber Pakhtunkhwa, Pakistan
- Political party: JUI (F) (2024-present)

Adnan Wazir is a Pakistani politician from Bannu District who has been a member of the Provincial Assembly of Khyber Pakhtunkhwa since February 2024.

== Career ==
He contested the 2024 general elections as a Jamiat Ulema-e-Islam (F) candidate from PK-101 Bannu-III and secured 25,513 votes. The runner-up was Shah Muhammad Khan of Pakistan Tehreek-e-Insaf/Independent, who secured 21,369 votes.
