= 2024 Pakistani provincial elections =

The 2024 Pakistani provincial elections may refer to:

- 2024 Balochistan provincial election
- 2024 Khyber Pakhtunkhwa provincial election
- 2024 Punjab provincial election
- 2024 Sindh provincial election
