= Samiullah Khan (politician) =

Pakistani politician

Member of the Provincial Assembly of Khyber Pakhtunkhwa
- Incumbent
- Assumed office 29 February 2024
- Constituency: PK-76 Peshawar-V

Personal details
- Born: Peshawar District, Khyber Pakhtunkhwa, Pakistan
- Party: PTI (2024-present)

Samiullah Khan is a Pakistani politician from Peshawar District. He is currently serving as member of the Provincial Assembly of Khyber Pakhtunkhwa since February 2024.

== Career ==
He contested the 2024 general elections as a Pakistan Tehreek-e-Insaf/Independent candidate from PK-76 Peshawar-V. He secured 18,888 votes while the runner-up was Khush Dil Khan of ANP who secured 12,986 votes.
