= Iftikhar Ahmad Khan Jadoon =

Pakistani politician

Member of the Provincial Assembly of Khyber Pakhtunkhwa
- Incumbent
- Assumed office 29 February 2024
- Preceded by: Aurangzeb Nalota
- Constituency: PK-44 Abbottabad-III

Personal details
- Born: Abbottabad District, Khyber Pakhtunkhwa, Pakistan
- Political party: PTI (2024-present)

Iftikhar Ahmad Khan Jadoon is a Pakistani politician from Abbottabad District. He is currently serving as member of the Provincial Assembly of Khyber Pakhtunkhwa since February 2024, currently serving as president Pakistan Tehreek-e-Insaf district Abbottabad also serving as Chairman District Development Advisory Committees.

== Career ==
He contested a 2023 by-election for the Tehsil chairmanship of Havelian Tehsil as a candidate of Pakistan Tehreek-e-Insaf (PTI) but was unsuccessful. He received 18,521 votes and lost to Uzair Sher Khan, an independent candidate.

He contested the 2024 general elections as a PTI/Independent candidate from PK-44 Abbottabad-III. He secured 34867 votes while runner-up was Aurangzeb Nalota of PML-N who secured 32858 votes.
