= Ahmed Khan Bahadur =

Pakistani politician from Mardan (born 1967)

Ahmed Khan Bahadur MPA

Member of the Provincial Assembly of Khyber Pakhtunkhwa
- Incumbent
- Assumed office 31 May 2013
- Constituency: PK-23 Mardan-I, PK-24 (Mardan-II), PK-52
- In office 2008–2013
- In office 2013–2018

Personal details
- Born: 9 July 1967 (age 59) Mardan, Khyber Pakhtunkhwa, Pakistan
- Party: ANP (2008-present)
- Education: Government Post Graduate College Mardan; Muslim Law College in Islamabad
- Occupation: Politician

Ahmed Khan Bahadur (Urdu: احمد خان بہادُر; born 9 July 1967) is a Pakistani politician from Mardan who serves as a member of the Khyber Pakhtunkhwa Assembly belong to the Awami National Party (ANP). He also serves as committee member of the Standing Committee No. 28 (Science and Technology and Information Technology Department), the Standing Committee No. 36 (Relief, Rehabilitation and Settlement Department) and the Standing Committee No. 14 (Industries and Technical Education Department). He also served as a member of the Khyber Pakhtunkhwa Assembly in 2008, again in 2013, and for a third time in 2018.

He earned his BA degree from the Government Post Graduate College Mardan and his LLB from the Muslim Law College in Islamabad.
