= Ajmal Khan (Pakistani politician) =

Member of the Provincial Assembly of Khyber Pakhtunkhwa from Bajaur (2024–2029)

- اجمل خان

Member of the Provincial Assembly of Khyber Pakhtunkhwa
- Incumbent
- Assumed office 29 February 2024
- Constituency: PK-21 Bajaur-III

Personal details
- Party: PTI (2024-present)

Ajmal Khan (Urdu: اجمل خان), is a Pakistani politician who is a member of the Provincial Assembly of Khyber Pakhtunkhwa.

== Political career ==
Khan won from PK-21 Bajaur-III constituency of the Provincial Assembly of Khyber Pakhtunkhwa during the 2024 Khyber Pakhtunkhwa provincial election. He received 16,712 votes as an independent candidate while the runner up candidate Sardar Khan of Jamaat-e-Islami received 8,128 votes.
