= Ishfaq Ahmed (politician) =

Pakistani politician

Member of the Provincial Assembly of Khyber Pakhtunkhwa
- Incumbent
- Assumed office 29 February 2024
- Constituency: PK-89 Nowshera-V

Personal details
- Born: Nowshera District, Khyber Pakhtunkhwa, Pakistan
- Political party: PTI (2024-present)

Ishfaq Ahmed is a Pakistani politician from Nowshera District. He is currently serving as a member of the Provincial Assembly of Khyber Pakhtunkhwa since February 2024.

== Career ==
He contested the 2024 general elections as a Pakistan Tehreek-e-Insaf/Independent candidate from PK-89 Nowshera-V. He secured 30,416 votes. The runner-up was Mian Iftikhar Hussain of Awami National Party who secured 15,630 votes.
