= Zar Alam Khan =

Pakistani politician

Member of the Provincial Assembly of Khyber Pakhtunkhwa
- Incumbent
- Assumed office 29 February 2024
- Constituency: PK-85 Nowshera-I

Personal details
- Born: Nowshera District, Khyber Pakhtunkhwa, Pakistan
- Political party: PTI (2024-present)

Zar Alam Khan is a Pakistani politician from Nowshera District. He is currently serving as a member of the Provincial Assembly of Khyber Pakhtunkhwa since February 2024.

== Career ==
He contested the 2024 general elections as a Pakistan Tehreek-e-Insaf/Independent candidate from PK-85 Nowshera-I. He secured 32,075 votes. The runner-up was Hamid Ali Khan of Awami National Party who secured 11,056 votes.
