= Muhammad Naeem Khan (Swat politician) =

Pakistani politician

Member of the Provincial Assembly of Khyber Pakhtunkhwa
- Incumbent
- Assumed office 29 February 2024
- Constituency: PK-10 Swat-VIII

Personal details
- Born: Swat District, Pakistan
- Political party: PTI (2024-present)

Muhammad Naeem Khan is a Pakistani politician from Swat District. He is currently serving as a member of the Provincial Assembly of Khyber Pakhtunkhwa since February 2024.

== Career ==
He contested the 2024 general elections as a Pakistan Tehreek-e-Insaf/Independent candidate from PK-10 Swat-VIII. He secured 21,681 votes. The runner-up was Mahmood Khan of PTI-P who secured 8,741 votes.
