= Ibrahim Khattak =

Pakistani politician

Member of the Provincial Assembly of Khyber Pakhtunkhwa
- In office 14 October 2018 – 21 January 2023
- Constituency: PK-61 (Nowshera-I)

Personal details
- Born: Nowshera, Khyber Pakhtunkhwa, Pakistan
- Party: PTI-P (2023-present)
- Other political affiliations: PTI (2018-2023)
- Parent: Pervez Khattak (father)

Muhammad Ibrahim Khan Khattak is a Pakistani politician who was a member of the Provincial Assembly of Khyber Pakhtunkhwa.

== Personal life ==
Ibrahim Khattak is the son of Pervez Khattak.

== Political career ==
Khattak was elected to the Provincial Assembly of Khyber Pakhtunkhwa as a candidate of Pakistan Tehreek-e-Insaf (PTI) from the constituency PK-61 in the 2018 Pakistani by-elections held on 14 October 2018. Now he is serving as a Parliamentary Secretary Of Relief Department KPK. He defeated Noor Alam Khan of Awami National Party (ANP). Khattak garnered 14,557 votes while his closest rival secured 9,282 votes.
