= Hamid Ur Rahman =

Pakistani politician

Member of the Provincial Assembly of Khyber Pakhtunkhwa
- Incumbent
- Assumed office 29 February 2024
- Constituency: PK-8 Swat-VI

Personal details
- Born: Swat District, Pakistan
- Party: PTI (2024-present)

Hamid Ur Rahman is a Pakistani politician from Swat District. He is currently serving as member of the Provincial Assembly of Khyber Pakhtunkhwa since February 2024.

== Career ==
He contested the 2024 general elections as a Pakistan Tehreek-e-Insaf/Independent candidate from PK-8 Swat-VI. He secured 33,152 votes. The runner-up was Jalat of PML-N who secured 15,007 votes.
