= Mehmood Jan =

Pakistani politician (born 1969)

Deputy Speaker of Provincial Assembly of Khyber Pakhtunkhwa
- In office 15 August 2018 – 18 January 2023
- Speaker: Mushtaq Ahmed Ghani
- Preceded by: Meher Taj Roghani
- Succeeded by: Suraya Bibi

Member of Provincial Assembly of Khyber Pakhtunkhwa
- In office 13 August 2018 – 18 January 2023
- Constituency: PK-66 (Peshawar-I)
- In office 31 May 2013 – 28 May 2018
- Constituency: PK-7 (Peshawar-VII])

Personal details
- Born: May 5, 1969 (age 57) Peshawar, Khyber Pakhtunkhwa, Pakistan
- Party: PTI (2013-present)

Mehmood Jan (Urdu: محمود جان; born 5 May 1969) is a Pakistani politician who served as the Deputy Speaker of the Provincial Assembly of Khyber Pakhtunkhwa, in office from August 2018 till January 2023. He had been a member of the Provincial Assembly of Khyber Pakhtunkhwa from August 2018 till January 2023. Previously, he was a member of the Provincial Assembly of Khyber Pakhtunkhwa from May 2013 to May 2018.

== Early life and education ==
He was born on 5 May 1969 in Peshawar, Pakistan.

== Political career ==
He was elected to the Provincial Assembly of Khyber Pakhtunkhwa as a candidate of Pakistan Tehreek-e-Insaf (PTI) from Constituency PK-7 (Peshawar-VII) in the 2013 Pakistani general election. He received 12,583 votes and defeated Hashmat Khan, a candidate of Jamaat-e-Islami Pakistan (JI).

He was re-elected to the Provincial Assembly of Khyber Pakhtunkhwa as a candidate of PTI from Constituency PK-66 (Peshawar-I) in the 2018 Pakistani general election. Following his successful election, PTI nominated him for the office of Deputy Speaker of the Khyber Pakhtunkhwa Assembly. On 15 August, he was elected as Deputy Speaker of the Khyber Pakhtunkhwa Assembly. He received 78 votes against his opponent Jamshaid Khan Mohmand who received 30 votes.
