= Ikram Ullah =

Pakistani politician

Member of the Provincial Assembly of Khyber Pakhtunkhwa
- Incumbent
- Assumed office 29 February 2024
- Constituency: PK-39 Mansehra-IV

Personal details
- Born: Mansehra District, Khyber Pakhtunkhwa, Pakistan
- Political party: PTI (2024-present)

Ikram Ullah is a Pakistani politician from Mansehra District. He is currently serving as a member of the Provincial Assembly of Khyber Pakhtunkhwa since February 2024.

== Career ==
He contested the 2024 general elections as a Pakistan Tehreek-e-Insaf/Independent candidate from PK-39 Mansehra-IV. He secured 23,853 votes while the runner-up was Muhammad Arif of PML-N who secured 19,331 votes.
