= Nawab Zada Wali Muhammad Khan =

Pakistani politician (born 1965)

Nawab Zada Wali Muhammad Khan MPA

Member of Provincial Assembly
- Incumbent
- Assumed office 2 June 2013

Personal details
- Born: 4 May 1965 (age 60) Battagram, Pakistan
- Party: PMLN (2025-present)
- Other political affiliations: PMLN (2013-2025)
- Parent: BEHRAM KHAN

Nawab Zada Wali Muhammad Khan (born 4 May 1965) is a Pakistani politician, and parliamentarian. He was elected a member of Provincial assembly on a ticket of Pakistan Muslim League N from PK-59 (Battagram) in the 2013 Pakistani general election.
