= Tariq Saeed (politician) =

Pakistani politician

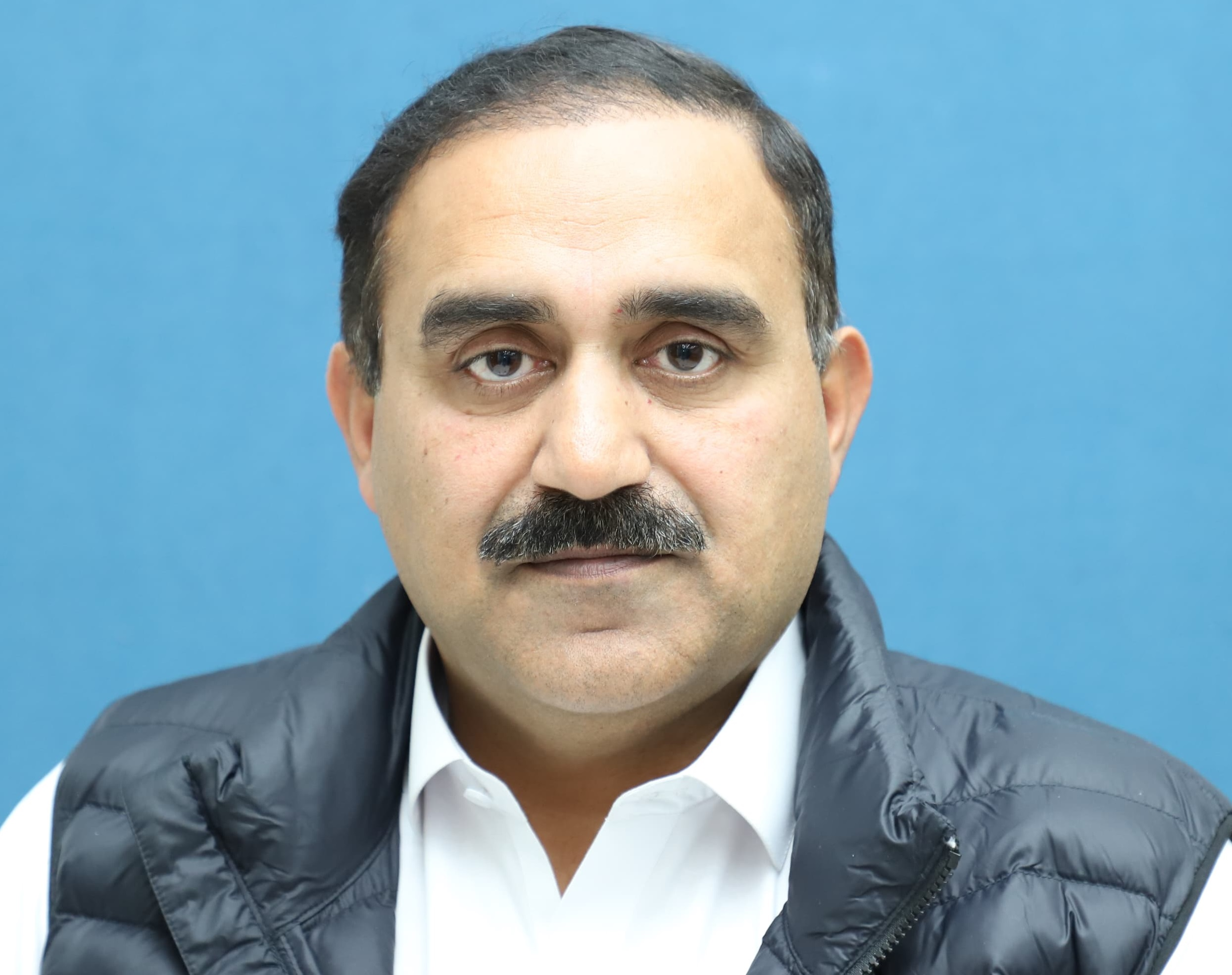
- Tariq Saeed Marwat

Special Assistant to the Chief Minister of Khyber Pakhtunkhwa on Home & Tribal Affairs
- Incumbent
- Assumed office 16 May 2026
- Governor: Faisal Karim Kundi

Member of the Provincial Assembly of Khyber Pakhtunkhwa
- Incumbent
- Assumed office 29 February 2024
- Constituency: PK-107 Lakki Marwat-III

Personal details
- Born: March 20, 1977 (age 49) Lakki Marwat District, Khyber Pakhtunkhwa, Pakistan
- Party: PTI (2024–present)

Tariq Saeed (born 20 March 1977) is a Pakistani politician from Lakki Marwat District who has been a member of the Provincial Assembly of Khyber Pakhtunkhwa since February 2024. He was appointed as the Special Assistant to the Chief Minister of Khyber Pakhtunkhwa on Home & Tribal Affairs on 16 May 2026.

== Career ==
He contested the 2024 general elections as a Pakistan Tehreek-e-Insaf/Independent candidate from PK-107 Lakki Marwat-III. He secured 34,400 votes.
