= Hisham Inamullah Khan =

Pakistani politician

Member of the Provincial Assembly of Khyber Pakhtunkhwa
- Incumbent
- Assumed office 29 February 2024
- Constituency: PK-92 (Lakki Marwat-II)

Member of the Provincial Assembly of Khyber Pakhtunkhwa
- In office 13 August 2018 – 10 August 2023
- Constituency: PK-92 (Lakki Marwat-II)

Provincial Minister of Khyber Pakhtunkhwa for Health
- In office 29 August 2018 – July 2021

Personal details
- Party: PMLN (2024-present)
- Other political affiliations: PTI-P (2023-2024); PTI (2018-2023)

Hisham Inamullah Khan is a Pakistani politician who is the incumbent member of the Provincial Assembly of Khyber Pakhtunkhwa since 10 February 2024. He has been former Provincial Minister of Khyber Pakhtunkhwa for Health, in office from 29 August 2018 to July 2021. He had been a member of the Provincial Assembly of Khyber Pakhtunkhwa from August 2018 to January 2023.

== Political career ==
He was elected to the Provincial Assembly of Khyber Pakhtunkhwa as a candidate of Pakistan Tehreek-e-Insaf from Constituency PK-92 (Lakki Marwat-II) in the 2018 Pakistani general election.

On 29 August 2018, he was inducted into the provincial Khyber Pakhtunkhwa cabinet of Chief Minister Mahmood Khan and was appointed as Provincial Minister of Khyber Pakhtunkhwa for Health.

On 20 May 2023, he left the PTI due to the 2023 Pakistani protests.
