= Muhammad Azam Khan (Pakistani politician) =

Pakistani politician

Member of the Provincial Assembly of Khyber Pakhtunkhwa
- Incumbent
- Assumed office 29 February 2024
- Constituency: PK-14 Lower Dir-I
- In office 13 August 2018 – 18 January 2023
- Constituency: PK-13 (Lower Dir-I)

Personal details
- Born: Lower Dir District, Khyber Pakhtunkhwa, Pakistan
- Party: PTI (2018-present)
- Other political affiliations: ANP (2015-2018)

Muhammad Azam Khan is a Pakistani politician from Lower Dir District. He is currently serving as a member of the Provincial Assembly of Khyber Pakhtunkhwa since February 2024 and previously served in this position from August 2018 to January 2023.

== Political career ==
He contested the 2008 North-West Frontier Province provincial election as a candidate of Awami National Party (ANP) from PF-94 Lower Dir-I, but was unsuccessful. He received 5,772 votes and was defeated by Mehmood Zaib Khan, a candidate of Pakistan People's Party (PPP).

He contested the 2013 Pakistani general election as a candidate of ANP from NA-34 Lower Dir, but was unsuccessful. He received votes and was defeated by Sahibzada Muhammad Yaqoob, a candidate of Jamaat-e-Islami (JI).

He was elected the Provincial Assembly of Khyber Pakhtunkhwa in the 2018 Khyber Pakhtunkhwa provincial election as a candidate of Pakistan Tehreek-e-Insaf (PTI) from PK-13 (Lower Dir-I). He received 21,683 votes and defeated Shad Nawaz Khan, a candidate of Muttahida Majlis-e-Amal (MMA).

He was re-elected to the Provincial Assembly in the 2024 Khyber Pakhtunkhwa provincial election as an independent candidate supported by PTI from PK-14 Lower Dir-I. He secured 31,228 votes, while the runner-up, Sahibzada Muhammad Yaqoob of JI, secured 16,840 votes.
