= Fazal e Haq =

Pakistani politician

Member of the Provincial Assembly of Khyber Pakhtunkhwa
- Incumbent
- Assumed office 29 February 2024
- Preceded by: Muhammad Dedar
- Constituency: PK-31 Kohistan Upper

Personal details
- Born: Upper Kohistan District, Khyber Pakhtunkhwa, Pakistan
- Political party: PTI (2024-present)

Fazal e Haq is a Pakistani politician from Upper Kohistan District. He is currently serving as member of the Provincial Assembly of Khyber Pakhtunkhwa since Feb 2024.

== Career ==
He contested the 2024 general elections as a Pakistan Tehreek-e-Insaf/Independent candidate from PK-31 Kohistan Upper. He secured 14384 votes.
