= Asif Khan (Waziristan politician) =

Pakistani politician

Member of the Provincial Assembly of Khyber Pakhtunkhwa
- Incumbent
- Assumed office 29 February 2024
- Constituency: PK-109 Upper South Waziristan

Personal details
- Born: Upper South Waziristan District, Khyber Pakhtunkhwa, Pakistan
- Political party: PTI (2024-present)

Asif Khan is a Pakistani politician from Upper South Waziristan District who has been a member of the Provincial Assembly of Khyber Pakhtunkhwa since February 2024.

== Career ==
He contested the 2024 general elections as a Pakistan Tehreek-e-Insaf/Independent candidate from PK-109 Upper South Waziristan and secured 11519 votes.
