= Pakistan Tehreek-e-Insaf – Parliamentarians =

Political party in Pakistan

Pakistan Tehreek-e-Insaf – Parliamentarians پاکستان تحریکِ انصاف – پارلیمنٹرینز Pakistan Movement for Justice – Parliamentarians
- Abbreviation: PTI-P
- Leader: Mahmood Khan
- General Secretary: Habib Noor
- Spokesperson: Arbab Muhammad Wasim Khan
- Founder: Pervez Khattak
- Founded: July 17, 2023; 3 years ago
- Split from: PTI
- Headquarters: Peshawar, Khyber Pakhtunkhwa, Pakistan
- National affiliation: PDM
- Colors: Red, dark green
- Slogan: Aman, Taraqqi, Khushhali, Khidmat (lit. 'Peace, Progress, Prosperity, Service')
- National Assembly of Pakistan: 1 / 366
- Provincial Assembly of Khyber Pakhtunkhwa: 4 / 145

Election symbol
- Turban

Party flag
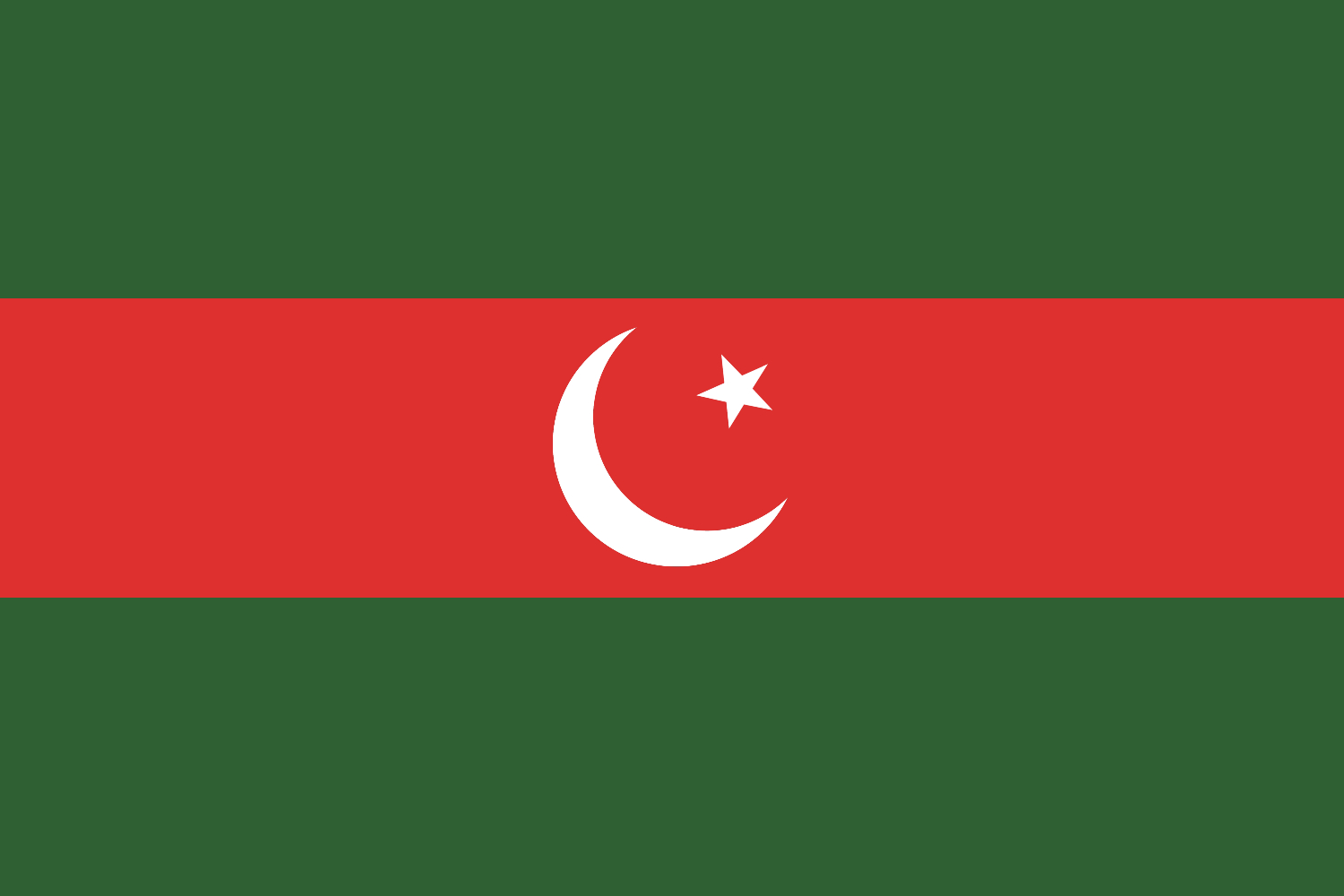

Website
- Official website

Pakistan Tehreek-e-Insaf – Parliamentarians (PTI–P) (Note: Urdu: پاکستان تحریکِ انصاف – پارلیمنٹرینز) is a political party in Pakistan. It was founded on 17 July 2023 by the former Chief Minister of Khyber Pakhtunkhwa, Pervez Khattak. The party was formed as a reaction to the 2023 Pakistani protests by breaking away from the Pakistan Tehreek-e-Insaf (PTI) led by Imran Khan.

Since the 2024 general election, the PTI–P has been led by Mahmood Khan after Pervez Khattak announced his retirement from politics. The PTI–P currently has four seats in the Khyber Pakhtunkhwa Assembly and one reserve seat in the National Assembly of Pakistan. The PTI–P is part of the opposition to the government of Khyber Pakhtunkhwa led by the PTI.

== History ==
On 9 May 2023, Imran Khan, the chairman of the Pakistan Tehreek-e-Insaf (PTI) and former Prime Minister of Pakistan, was arrested by the National Accountability Bureau in the Al-Qadir University case from inside the Islamabad High Court. As a result, mass protests were held across the country during which some military installations were attacked, such as the General Headquarters of the Pakistan Army in Rawalpindi and the Corps Commander House in Lahore.

In the aftermath of these events, many politicians from the PTI had condemned the protests and announced their resignations from the party due to pressure from the Pakistani army. On 2 June 2023, Pervez Khattak, the former Chief Minister of Khyber Pakhtunkhwa and Minister of Defence, while not leaving the party, had resigned from his position as the party's provincial president in Khyber Pakhtunkhwa.

On 12 July 2023, Khattak's basic membership with the PTI was terminated due to his lack of response to a show-cause notice which was issued because of allegations that he was inciting other members to leave the party.

Five days later, on 17 July, Khattak announced his own breakaway party called the Pakistan Tehreek-e-Insaf Parliamentarians (PTI–P) at a gathering he had held with other senior politicians. Mahmood Khan, another former Chief Minister of the province, sat alongside Khattak at the time of the announcement. According to a handout issued at the gathering, Khattak would be the chief of the PTI–P while more than 57 former members of the Provincial Assembly of Khyber Pakhtunkhwa had joined. The handout further explained that the cause of the new party's formation was differences and conflict with the PTI over the 9 May riots.

=== 2024 election ===
The PTI–P failed to win any seat in the 2024 general election, yet get one reserved seat in the National Assembly of Pakistan.

== Notable members ==
Member	Positions held
Mahmood Khan	Chief Minister of Khyber Pakhtunkhwa (2018-2023); Provincial Minister of Khyber Pakhtunkhwa for Sports, Culture, Tourism and Museums (2013-2018); Member of the Provincial Assembly for PK-9 Swat-VIII (2018-2023) and for PK-84 Swat-IV (2013-2018)
Ibrahim Khattak	Son of Pervez Khattak; Member of the Provincial Assembly for PK-61 Nowshera-I (2018-2023)
Muhammad Iqbal Wazir	Member of the Provincial Assembly for PK-111 North Waziristan-I (2019-2023)
Muhammad Ishtiaq Urmar	Member of the Provincial Assembly for PK-69 Peshawar-IV (2018-2023) and for PK-11 Peshawar-XI (2013-2018); Provincial Minister of Khyber Pakhtunkhwa for Environment, Forest and Wildlife (2018-2023)
Zia Ullah Khan Bangash	Member of the Provincial Assembly for PK-82 Kohat-III (2018-2023) and for PK-38 Kohat-II (2013-2018); Advisor to the Chief Minister for Elementary Education (2018-2020); Advisor to the Chief Minister for Information and Technology (2020-2021)
Muhammad Yaqoob Sheikh	Member of the National Assembly for NA-39 Dera Ismail Khan-II (2018-2023)
Saleh Muhammad Khan	Member of the National Assembly for NA-13 Mansehra-I (2018-2023); President of PTI Hazara (January 2023-July 2023)
Sher Akbar Khan	Member of the National Assembly for NA-9 Buner (2018-2023) and NA-28 Buner (2002-2007, 2013-2018)
Shaukat Ali	Member of the National Assembly for NA-31 Peshawar-V (2018-2022)
