= Ajab Gul (politician) =

Pakistani politician

Member of the Provincial Assembly of Khyber Pakhtunkhwa
- Incumbent
- Assumed office 29 February 2024
- Constituency: PK-110 Lower South Waziristan

Personal details
- Born: Lower South Waziristan District, Khyber Pakhtunkhwa, Pakistan
- Party: PTI (2024-present)

Ajab Gul is a Pakistani politician from Lower South Waziristan District. He is currently serving as a member of the Provincial Assembly of Khyber Pakhtunkhwa since February 2024.

== Career ==
He contested the 2024 general elections as a Pakistan Tehreek-e-Insaf/Independent candidate from PK-110 Lower South Waziristan. He secured 12,525 votes.
