= Akhtar Khan (politician) =

Pakistani Politician

Member of the Provincial Assembly of Khyber Pakhtunkhwa
- Incumbent
- Assumed office 29 February 2024
- Constituency: PK-5 Swat-III

Personal details
- Born: Swat District, Pakistan
- Party: PTI (2024-present)

Akhtar Khan is a Pakistani politician from Swat District. He is currently serving as member of the Provincial Assembly of Khyber Pakhtunkhwa and chairman ddac swat since February 2024.

== Career ==
He contested the 2024 general elections as a Pakistan Tehreek-e-Insaf/Independent candidate from PK-5 Swat-III. He secured 24055 votes. His runner-up was Sanaullah Khan of JUI-F who secured votes.
