= Shah Abu Tarab Khan Bangash =

Pakistani politician

Member of the Provincial Assembly of Khyber Pakhtunkhwa
- Incumbent
- Assumed office 29 February 2024
- Constituency: PK-93 Hangu-II

Personal details
- Born: Hangu District, Khyber Pakhtunkhwa, Pakistan
- Political party: PTI (2024-present)

Shah Abu Tarab Khan Bangash is a Pakistani politician from Hangu District. He is currently serving as a member of the Provincial Assembly of Khyber Pakhtunkhwa since February 2024.

== Career ==
He contested the 2024 general elections as a Pakistan Tehreek-e-Insaf/Independent candidate from PK-93 Hangu-II. He secured 31136 votes. His runner-up was Maulana Tehseen Ullah of JUI-F who secured 16933 votes.
