= Malik Adeel Iqbal =

Pakistani politician

Member of the Provincial Assembly of Khyber Pakhtunkhwa
- Incumbent
- Assumed office 29 February 2024
- Constituency: PK-48 Haripur-III

Personal details
- Born: Haripur District, Khyber Pakhtunkhwa, Pakistan
- Political party: PTI (2024-present)

Malik Adeel Iqbal is a Pakistani politician from Haripur District. He is currently serving as member of the Provincial Assembly of Khyber Pakhtunkhwa since February 2024.

== Career ==
He contested the 2024 general elections as a Pakistan Tehreek-e-Insaf/Independent candidate from PK-48 Haripur-III. He secured 41777 votes.
