= Zahir Khan (politician) =

Pakistani politician

Member of the Provincial Assembly of Khyber Pakhtunkhwa
- Incumbent
- Assumed office 29 February 2024
- Constituency: PK-78 Peshawar-VII

Personal details
- Born: Peshawar District, Khyber Pakhtunkhwa, Pakistan
- Party: PMLN (2024-present)

Zahir Khan is a Pakistani politician from Peshawar District. He is currently serving as member of the Provincial Assembly of Khyber Pakhtunkhwa since February 2024.

== Career ==
He contested the 2024 general elections as a Pakistan Muslim League (N) candidate from PK-78 Peshawar-VII. He secured 22,559 votes while the runner-up was Zahir Shah of JUI-F who secured 7,558 votes.
