= Muhammad Riaz (Pakistani politician) =

Pakistani politician

Member of the Provincial Assembly of Khyber Pakhtunkhwa
- Incumbent
- Assumed office 29 February 2024
- Constituency: PK-33 Kolai Palas

Personal details
- Born: Kolai Palas District, Khyber Pakhtunkhwa, Pakistan
- Party: PTI (2024-present)

Muhammad Riaz is a Pakistani politician and provincial legislator from Kolai Palas District. He is currently serving as member of the Provincial Assembly of Khyber Pakhtunkhwa since February 2024.

He contested the 2024 general elections as a Pakistan Tehreek-e-Insaf/Independent candidate from PK-33 Kolai Palas. He secured 7024 votes.
