= Imtiaz Shahid =

Pakistani politician

Imtiaz Shahid Minister

Minister for Law, Parliamentary Affairs and Human Rights
- In office 17 October 2014 – 28 May 2018
- Preceded by: Israr Ullah Khan Gandapur
- Constituency: PK-39 Kohat-III

Personal details
- Born: 10 April 1961 (age 65) Shakardara, Kohat District
- Party: PTI-P (2025-present)
- Other political affiliations: PTI (2013-2025)
- Occupation: Politician

Imtiaz Shahid Qureshi (Urdu: امتیاز شاہد قریشی; born 10 April 1961) is a Pakistani politician from Shakardara, Kohat District. He served as Minister for Law, Parliamentary Affairs and Human Rights in the 10th Khyber Pakhtunkhwa Assembly in 2014.

He also played an instrumental role as a member of committees, including The Khyber Pakhtunkhwa Police Bill, 2017, the Committee on The Khyber Pakhtunkhwa Whistleblower Protection and Vigilance commission Bill, and Right to Information. In addition, he served as the Deputy Speaker of Khyber Pakhtunkhwa Assembly.
