= Sajjad Ullah =

Sajjad Ullah: KP Assembly member

Member of the Provincial Assembly of Khyber Pakhtunkhwa
- Incumbent
- Assumed office 29 February 2024
- Constituency: PK-32 Kohistan Lower

Personal details
- Born: Lower Kohistan District, Khyber Pakhtunkhwa, Pakistan
- Political party: JUI (F) (2024-present)

Sajjad Ullah is a Pakistani politician from Lower Kohistan District. He is currently serving as member of the Provincial Assembly of Khyber Pakhtunkhwa since February 2024.

== Career ==
He contested the 2024 general elections as a Jamiat Ulema-e-Islam (F) candidate from PK-32 Kohistan Lower. He secured 13826 votes while runner-up was Pakistan Tehreek-e-Insaf/Independent of Khan Member who secured 12496 votes.
