= Arbab Muhammad Wasim Khan =

Pakistani politician

Parliamentary Leader Of PTI-P on Khyber Pakhtunkhwa Assembly
- Incumbent
- Assumed office 4 March 2024
- Deputy: Muhammad Iqbal Wazir

Member of the Khyber Pakhtunkhwa Assembly
- Incumbent
- Assumed office 29 February 2024
- Constituency: PK-73 Peshawar-II
- In office 13 August 2018 – 18 January 2023
- Constituency: PK-8 (Peshawar-VIII)
- In office 24 May 2016 – 28 May 2018
- Constituency: PK-67 (Peshawar-II)

Personal details
- Born: Peshawar, Khyber Pakhtunkhwa, Pakistan
- Party: PTI-P (2023-present)
- Other political affiliations: PTI (2018-2023); PMLN (2016-2018)
- Occupation: Politician

Arbab Muhammad Wasim Khan (Pashto: ارباب محمد وسيم خان) is a Pakistani politician hailing from Peshawar, who had been a member of the Khyber Pakhtunkhwa Assembly from May 2016 to May 2018 and from August 2018 to January 2023.

== Political career ==
Arbab waseem hayat was elected as the member of the Khyber Pakhtunkhwa Assembly on the ticket of Pakistan Muslim League (N) from PK-8 (Peshawar-VIII) in by-polls held in May 2016 following the vacancy caused by the death of his uncle and father in law Arbab Akbar Hayat.

He contested the 2018 provincial election on the ticket of Pakistan Tehreek-e-Insaf and won PK-67 (Peshawar-II).
