= Aurangzeb Nalota =

Pakistani politician

Sardar Aurangzeb Nalota

Member of the Provincial Assembly of Khyber Pakhtunkhwa
- In office 13 August 2018 – 18 January 2023
- Constituency: PK-37 (Abbottabad-II)
- In office 2008 – 28 May 2018
- Constituency: Constituency PK-47 (Abbottabad-IV)

Personal details
- Born: 4 June 1961 (age 65) Abbottabad, Khyber Pakhtunkhwa, Pakistan
- Party: PMLN

Sardar Aurangzeb Nalota is a Pakistani politician from the province of Khyber Pakhtunkhwa. He had been a member of the Provincial Assembly of Khyber Pakhtunkhwa from 2008 to May 2018 and from August 2018 to January 2023.

== Early life and education ==
He was born on 4 June 1961 in Abbottabad District.

He has a Bachelors of Arts degree.

== Political career ==
He ran for the seat of the Provincial Assembly of the North-West Frontier Province as a candidate of Pakistan Muslim League (N) (PML-N) from Constituency PF-47 (Abbottabad-IV) in the 2002 Pakistani general election but was unsuccessful. He received 12,434 votes and lost the seat to Nisar Safdar Khan, a candidate of Pakistan Muslim League (Q) (PML-Q).

He was elected to the Provincial Assembly of the North-West Frontier Province as a candidate of PML-N from Constituency PF-47 (Abbottabad-IV) in the 2008 Pakistani general election. He received 18,377 votes and defeated Ijaz Zar Khan Jadoon, an independent candidate.

He was re-elected to the Provincial Assembly of Khyber Pakhtunkhwa as a candidate of PML-N from Constituency PK-47 (Abbottabad-IV) in the 2013 Pakistani general election. He received 25,797 votes and defeated a candidate of Pakistan Tehreek-e-Insaf.

He was re-elected to Provincial Assembly of Khyber Pakhtunkhwa as a candidate of PML-N from Constituency PK-37 (Abbottabad-II) in the 2018 Pakistani general election.
