= Ali Shah (Pakistani politician) =

Pakistani politician

Member of the Provincial Assembly of Khyber Pakhtunkhwa
- Incumbent
- Assumed office 29 February 2024
- Constituency: PK-4 Swat-II

Personal details
- Born: Swat District, Pakistan
- Political party: PTI (2024-present)

Ali Shah is a Pakistani politician from Swat District. He is currently serving as a member of the Provincial Assembly of Khyber Pakhtunkhwa since February 2024.

== Career ==
He contested the 2024 general elections as a Pakistan Tehreek-e-Insaf/Independent candidate from PK-4 Swat-II. He secured 30022 votes. His runner-up was Sardar Khan of PML-N who secured 12514 votes.
