= Riaz Khan (politician) =

Pakistani politician

- ریاض خان

Provincial Minister of Irrigation for Khyber Pakhtunkhwa
- Incumbent
- Assumed office 31 October 2025

Member of the Provincial Assembly of Khyber Pakhtunkhwa
- Incumbent
- Assumed office 29 February 2024
- Constituency: PK-25 Buner-I
- In office 13 August 2018 – 18 January 2023
- Constituency: PK-20 (Buner-I)

Personal details
- Born: 2 April 1976 (age 50) Buner, Khyber Pakhtunkhwa, Pakistan
- Party: PTI (2018-present)
- Occupation: Politician

Riaz Khan (born 2 April 1976) is a Pakistani politician who had been a member of the Provincial Assembly of Khyber Pakhtunkhwa from August 2018 till January 2023. He beat Maulana Fazli Ghafoor and Bakht Jehan Khan in the 2018 general elections.

In the February 2024 general election he remained elected member of Khyber pakhtunkhwa Provincial assembly member.

He is the PTI President in Buner, and he has held the positions of MPA and Minister for C&W and Public health engineering from 2018 to 2022.

Riaz Khan succeeded his father Bahadar Khan in 2003 as the Khan of Gadezai.

== Political career ==
Before he was elected as a KPK provincial member in 2018, he also served as A District Counceler from UC Malakpur elected in Khyber Pakhtunkhwa Local Government Election 2015. He was elected to the Provincial Assembly of Khyber Pakhtunkhwa as a candidate of Pakistan Tehreek-e-Insaf from Constituency PK-20 (Buner-I) in 2018 Pakistani general election.
