= Aurangzeb Khan (politician) =

Pakistani politician

Member of the Provincial Assembly of Khyber Pakhtunkhwa
- Incumbent
- Assumed office 29 February 2024
- Constituency: PK-94 Orakzai

Personal details
- Born: Orakzai District, Khyber Pakhtunkhwa, Pakistan
- Political party: PTI (2024-present)

Aurangzeb Khan is a Pakistani politician from Orakzai District. He is currently serving as a member of the Provincial Assembly of Khyber Pakhtunkhwa since February 2024.

== Career ==
He contested the 2024 general elections as a Pakistan Tehreek-e-Insaf/Independent candidate from PK-94 Orakzai. He secured 18,648 votes. The runner-up was Abdul Rehman of JUI-F who secured 8,274 votes.
