= Muhammad Abdul Salam =

Pakistani politician

Member of the Provincial Assembly of Khyber Pakhtunkhwa
- Incumbent
- Assumed office 29 February 2024
- Constituency: PK-58 Mardan-V

Personal details
- Born: Mardan District, Khyber Pakhtunkhwa, Pakistan
- Party: PTI (2018-present)

Muhammad Abdul Salam is a Pakistani politician from Mardan District. He is currently serving as member of the Provincial Assembly of Khyber Pakhtunkhwa since February 2024.

== Career ==
He contested the 2024 general elections as a Pakistan Tehreek-e-Insaf/Independent candidate from PK-58 Mardan-V. He secured 38126 votes while runner-up was Haider Khan Hoti of ANP who secured 26497 votes.
