= Iftikhar Ullah Jan =

Pakistani politician

Member of the Provincial Assembly of Khyber Pakhtunkhwa
- Incumbent
- Assumed office 29 February 2024
- Constituency: PK-64 Charsadda-III

Personal details
- Born: Charsadda District, Khyber Pakhtunkhwa, Pakistan
- Political party: PTI (2024-present)

Iftikhar Ullah Jan is a Pakistani politician from Charsadda District. He is currently serving as member of the Provincial Assembly of Khyber Pakhtunkhwa since February 2024.

== Career ==
He contested the 2024 general elections as a Pakistan Tehreek-e-Insaf/Independent candidate from PK-64 Charsadda-III. He secured 39538 votes while the runner-up was Sultan Muhammad Khan of ANP who secured 19022 votes.He defeated two former provincial law ministers (Sultan Muhammad Khan, Arshad Abdullah) with a huge majority in the provincial election 2024.
