= Ubaidur Rahman (politician) =

Pakistani politician

Member of the Provincial Assembly of Khyber Pakhtunkhwa
- Incumbent
- Assumed office 29 February 2024
- Constituency: PK-17 Lower Dir-IV

Personal details
- Born: Lower Dir District, Khyber Pakhtunkhwa, Pakistan
- Political party: PTI (2024-present)

Ubaidur Rahman is a Pakistani politician from Lower Dir District. He is currently serving as a member of the Provincial Assembly of Khyber Pakhtunkhwa since 28 February 2024. Currently he is working as advisor to Chief minister Khyber Pakhtunkhwa for health affairs.

== Career ==
He contested the 2024 general elections as a Pakistan Tehreek-e-Insaf/Independent candidate from PK-17 Lower Dir-IV. He secured 23,229 votes. The runner-up was Izazul Mulk of Jamaat-e-Islami Pakistan who secured 19,990 votes.

In July 2024 he was appointed as the District Development Advisory Committee Chairman Lower Dir by the Chief Minister of Khyber Pakhtunkhwa.
