= PK-106 Lakki Marwat-II =

Pakistani electoral district

- Constituency for the Khyber Pakhtunkhwa Assembly
- Region: Bettani Tehsil and Ghazni Khel Tehsil of Lakki Marwat District

Current constituency
- Party: Pakistan Tehreek-e-Insaf
- Member(s): Hisham Inamullah Khan
- Created from: PK-75 Lakki Marwat-II (2002-2018); PK-92 Lakki Marwat-II (2018-2023)

PK-106 Lakki Marwat-II (پی کے-106، لکی مروت-2) is a constituency for the Khyber Pakhtunkhwa Assembly of the Khyber Pakhtunkhwa province of Pakistan.

== See also ==
- PK-105 Lakki Marwat-I
- PK-107 Lakki Marwat-III
