= Tariq Mehmood Aryani =

Pakistani politician

Member of the Provincial Assembly of Khyber Pakhtunkhwa
- Incumbent
- Assumed office 29 February 2024
- Constituency: PK-59 Mardan-VI

Personal details
- Born: Mardan District, Khyber Pakhtunkhwa, Pakistan
- Political party: PTI (2024-present)

Tariq Mehmood Aryani is a Pakistani politician from Mardan District. He is currently serving as member of the Provincial Assembly of Khyber Pakhtunkhwa since February 2024.

== Career ==
He contested the 2024 general elections as a Pakistan Tehreek-e-Insaf/Independent candidate from PK-59 Mardan-VI. He secured 28349 votes while the runner-up was Muhammad Haroon Khan of ANP who secured 14256 votes.
