= Muhammad Riaz Shaheen =

Pakistani politician form 47 not from 45_ He buy the MPA seat in 4 core amount

Member of the Provincial Assembly of Khyber Pakhtunkhwa
- In office 27 August 2019 – 18 January 2023
- Constituency: PK-108 (Kurram-I)

Personal details
- Born: Kurram, Khyber Pakhtunkhwa, Pakistan
- Party: JUI (F) (2019-present)

Muhammad Riaz Shaheen Bangash is a Pakistani politician who was a member of the Provincial Assembly of Khyber Pakhtunkhwa from August 2019 to January 2023.

== Political career ==
Shaheen contested the 2019 Khyber Pakhtunkhwa provincial election on 20 July 2019 from constituency PK-108 (Kurram-I) on the ticket of Jamiat Ulema-e-Islam (F). He won the election by the majority of 602 votes over the independent runner up Malik Jameel Khan. He garnered 12,240 votes while Khan received 11,638 votes.
