= PK-102 Bannu-IV =

Pakistani electoral district

- Constituency for the Khyber Pakhtunkhwa Assembly
- Region: Bannu Tehsil of Bannu District

Current constituency
- Seats: 1
- Party: Vacant
- Member: Akram Khan Durrani
- Created from: PK-70 Bannu-I (before 2018) PK-90 Bannu-IV (2018-2022)

PK-102 Bannu-IV (پی کے-102 بنوں-4) is a constituency for the Khyber Pakhtunkhwa Assembly of the Khyber Pakhtunkhwa province of Pakistan.

== See also ==
- PK-101 Bannu-III
- PK-103 North Waziristan-I
