= Zubair Khan (Pakistani politician) =

Pakistani politician

Zubair Khan Swati
- محمد زبیر خان الائی

Member of the Provincial Assembly of Khyber Pakhtunkhwa

Member of the U.S. House of Representatives from 's Battagram District district
- In office 13 August 2018 – 18 January 2023
- Constituency: PK-34 Battagram-I

Personal details
- Party: PTI (2018-present)

Prince Zubair Khan Swati is a Pakistani politician who is a member of the Provincial Assembly of Khyber Pakhtunkhwa for the second time. He is the grandson of Nawab Ayub Khan Swati, the last Nawab of Allai tribal territory and a four-times elected member of the National Assembly of Pakistan. His father, Fateh Muhammad Khan Swati, was a member of the Provincial Assembly of Khyber Pakhtunkhwa for 5 consecutive terms. His uncle, Prince Nawaz Khan Swati, is also the current MNA of NA-13 Battagram.

== Political career ==
He was elected to the Provincial Assembly of Khyber Pakhtunkhwa as a candidate of Pakistan Tehreek-e-Insaf from Constituency PK-28 (Battagram-I) in 2018 Pakistani general election.

In the 2024 general election, he was re-elected as Member of the Provincial Assembly (MPA) for third time from PK 34 Battagram-I.
