= Jalal Khan (politician) =

Pakistani politician

Member of the Provincial Assembly of Khyber Pakhtunkhwa
- Incumbent
- Assumed office 29 February 2024
- Preceded by: Taimur Khan Jhagra
- Constituency: PK-79 Peshawar-VIII

Personal details
- Born: Peshawar District, Khyber Pakhtunkhwa, Pakistan
- Party: PMLN (2024-present)

Jalal Khan is a Pakistani politician from Peshawar District. He is currently serving as member of the Provincial Assembly of Khyber Pakhtunkhwa since February 2024.

== Career ==
He contested the 2024 general elections as a Pakistan Muslim League (N) candidate from PK-79 Peshawar-VIII. He secured 16031 votes while the runner-up was Taimur Khan Jhagra of Independent politician supported (PTI) Pakistan Tehreek-e-Insaf, who secured 11495 votes.
