= Suraya Bibi =

Pakistani politician

Suriya Bibi

Deputy Speaker of the Provincial Assembly of Khyber Pakhtunkhwa
- Incumbent
- Assumed office 29 February 2024
- Speaker: Babar Saleem Swati
- Preceded by: Mehmood Jan

Member of the Provincial Assembly of Khyber Pakhtunkhwa
- Incumbent
- Assumed office 29 February 2024
- Constituency: PK-1 Upper Chitral

Personal details
- Born: Upper Chitral District, Pakistan
- Political party: PTI (2024-present)

Suriya Bibi (born 4 January 1979) is a Pakistani politician from Upper Chitral District. She is currently serving as Deputy Speaker of the Provincial Assembly of Khyber Pakhtunkhwa since Feb 2024.

== Career ==
She contested the 2024 general elections as a Pakistan Tehreek-e-Insaf/Independent candidate from PK-1 Upper Chitral. She secured 18,914 votes. The runner-up candidate was Shakeel Ahmad of Jamiat Ulema-e-Islam (F) who secured 10,533 votes.
