= Sher Ali Afridi (Pakistani politician) =

Pakistani politician

Member of the Provincial Assembly of Khyber Pakhtunkhwa
- Incumbent
- Assumed office 29 February 2024
- Constituency: PK-77 Peshawar-VI

Personal details
- Born: 15 March 1992 (age 34) Peshawar District, Khyber Pakhtunkhwa, Pakistan
- Party: PTI (2024-present)

Sher Ali Afridi is a Pakistani politician from Peshawar District. He is currently serving as member of the Provincial Assembly of Khyber Pakhtunkhwa since February 2024.

== Career ==
He contested the 2024 general elections as a Pakistan Tehreek-e-Insaf/Independent candidate from PK-77 Peshawar-VI. He secured 30,544 votes while the runner-up was Sifat Ullah of JUI-F who secured 7,615 votes.
