= Nek Muhammad Khan =

Pakistani politician

Special Assistant to Chief Minister for Relief on Khyber Pakhtunkhwa
- In office 13 September 2024 – 13 October 2025
- Governor: Faisal Karim Kundi
- Chief Minister: Ali Amin Gandapur
- Succeeded by: Aqib Ullah Khan (As Minister)

Member of the Provincial Assembly of Khyber Pakhtunkhwa
- Incumbent
- Assumed office 29 February 2024
- Preceded by: Mir Kalam Wazir
- Constituency: PK-104 North Waziristan-II

Personal details
- Born: North Waziristan District, Khyber Pakhtunkhwa, Pakistan
- Political party: PTI (2024-present)

Nek Muhammad Khan is a Pakistani politician from North Waziristan District who has been a member of the Provincial Assembly of Khyber Pakhtunkhwa since February 2024.

== Career ==
He contested the 2024 general elections as a Pakistan Tehreek-e-Insaf/Independent candidate from PK-104 North Waziristan-II and secured 11,281 votes. The runner-up was Pir Muhammad Aqal Shah of Jamiat Ulema-e-Islam (F) who secured 10,422 votes.
