= PK-10 Swat-VIII =

Pakistani electoral district

- Constituency for the Khyber Pakhtunkhwa Assembly
- Region: Matta Tehsil (partly) of Swat District

Current constituency
- Created: 2018
- Created from: PK-84 Swat-V (2002-2018); PK-9 Swat-VIII (2018-2023)

PK-10 Swat-VIII (پی کے-10، سوات-8) is a constituency for the Khyber Pakhtunkhwa Assembly of the Khyber Pakhtunkhwa province of Pakistan. It was created in 2018 after 2017 Delimitations when Swat gained 1 seat after Census 2017.

== See also ==
- PK-9 Swat-VII
- PK-11 Upper Dir-I
