= PK-34 Battagram-I =

Pakistani electoral district

- Constituency for the Khyber Pakhtunkhwa Assembly
- Region: Allai Tehsil and Battagram Tehsil (partly) of Battagram District

Current constituency
- Party: Pakistan Tehreek-e-Insaf
- Member: Zubair Khan
- Created from: PK-60 Batagram-II (2002-2018) PK-28 Battagram-I (2018-2023)

PK-34 Battagram-I (پی کے-34 بٹگرام-1) is a constituency for the Khyber Pakhtunkhwa Assembly of the Khyber Pakhtunkhwa province of Pakistan.

== See also ==
- PK-33 Kolai Palas
- PK-35 Battagram-II
