= PK-107 Lakki Marwat-III =

Pakistani electoral district

- Constituency for the Khyber Pakhtunkhwa Assembly
- Region: Sarai Naurang Tehsil of Lakki Marwat District

Current constituency
- Party: Muttahida Majlis-e-Amal
- Member(s): Munawar Khan
- Created from: PK-74 Lakki Marwat-I (2002–2018); PK-93 Lakki Marwat-III (2018–2023)

PK-107 Lakki Marwat-III (پی کے-107، لکی مروت-3) is a constituency for the Khyber Pakhtunkhwa Assembly of the Khyber Pakhtunkhwa province of Pakistan.

== See also ==
- PK-106 Lakki Marwat-II
- PK-108 Tank
