= PK-8 Swat-VI =

Pakistani electoral district

- Constituency for the Khyber Pakhtunkhwa Assembly
- Region: Kabal Tehsil (partly) of Swat District

Current constituency
- Party: Pakistan Tehreek-e-Insaf
- Member(s): Mahmood Khan, CM of KPK
- Created from: PK-83 Swat-IV (2002–2018); PK-7 Swat-VI (2018–2023)

PK-8 Swat-VI (پی کے-8، سوات-6) is a constituency for the Khyber Pakhtunkhwa Assembly of the Khyber Pakhtunkhwa province of Pakistan.

== See also ==
- PK-7 Swat-V
- PK-9 Swat-VII
