= Kiramat Ullah Khan =

Pakistani politician

- کرامت اللہ خان

Member of the Provincial Assembly of Khyber Pakhtunkhwa
- Incumbent
- Assumed office 29 February 2024
- Constituency: PK-72 Peshawar-I

Speaker of the Provincial Assembly of Khyber Pakhtunkhwa
- In office 2008–2013

Personal details
- Born: December 12, 1953 (age 72) Peshawar District, Khyber Pakhtunkhwa, Pakistan
- Party: PPP (1996-present)

Kiramat Ullah Khan (Urdu: کرامت اللہ خان; born December 12, 1953) is a senior Pakistani politician and former speaker of the Provincial Assembly of Khyber Pakhtunkhwa, serving from 2008 to 2013. He hails from Peshawar District, Pakistan. Presently, he holds the position of a member of the Provincial Assembly of Khyber Pakhtunkhwa since February 2024.

== Career ==
He is a Senior Politician from Khyber Pakhtunkhwa, Pakistan, and a central leader of the Pakistan Peoples Party (PPP) . He served as the Speaker of the Provincial Assembly of Khyber Pakhtunkhwa, Pakistan, from 2008 to 2013. During his political career, he also held the Position of Acting Governor of Khyber Pakhtunkhwa for a brief period, reflecting his strong administrative and constitutional experience.

He has been serving again as a Member of the Provincial Assembly of Khyber Pakhtunkhwa since February 2024, where he remains actively involved in legislative affairs and public policy matters

He is the first Politician from Khyber Pakhtunkhwa who established the first women’s university in Khyber Pakhtunkhwa, Peshawar The Shaheed Mohtarma Benazir Bhutto Women University marking a major milestone in promoting women’s higher education in the province

He belongs to a highly influential and large feudal (landed aristocratic) family from Chaghar Matti. His father, Khan Nasrullah Khan ChagharMatti, was a prominent feudal lord and a widely respected social and political figure of his time. He was closely associated with Khan Abdul Ghaffar Khan (Bacha Khan) and the Khudai Khidmatgar movement, and is remembered as a committed companion and supporter of its ideology of social reform, non-violence, and public service
