= PK-41 Torghar =

Pakistani electoral district

- Constituency for the Khyber Pakhtunkhwa Assembly
- Region: Torghar District

Current constituency
- Party: Awami National Party
- Member: Laiq Muhammad Khan
- Created from: PK-58 Tor Ghar (2002–2018); PK-35 Torghar (2018–2023)

PK-41 Torghar (پی کے-41 تورغر) is a constituency for the Khyber Pakhtunkhwa Assembly of the Khyber Pakhtunkhwa province of Pakistan.

== See also ==
- PK-40 Mansehra-V
- PK-42 Abbottabad-I
