= PK-75 Peshawar-IV =

Constituency for the Khyber Pakhtunkhwa Assembly, in Pakistan

- Constituency for the Khyber Pakhtunkhwa Assembly
- Region: Chamkani Tehsil (partly) and Badhber Tehsil (partly) of Peshawar District

Current constituency
- Created: 2018
- Party: Pakistan Tehreek-e-Insaf
- Member(s): Syed Muhammad Ishtiaq
- Created from: PK-09 Peshawar-IX and PK-11 Peshawar-XI

PK-75 Peshawar-IV (پی کے-75 پشاور-4) is a constituency for the Khyber Pakhtunkhwa Assembly of the Khyber Pakhtunkhwa province of Pakistan.

== Members of Assembly ==
=== 2018-2022 PK-69 Peshawar-IV ===
Election	Member	Party
2018	Syed Muhammad Ishtiaq	PTI

== Elections 2018 ==
Syed Muhammad Ishtiaq of Pakistan Tehreek-e-Insaf won the seat by getting 17,652 votes.

Provincial election 2018: PK-69 Peshawar-IV
Party	Candidate	Votes	%
PTI	Syed Muhammad Ishtiaq	17,652	29.11
Independent	Arbab Muhammad Usman Khan	12,388	20.43
MMA	Khalid Waqar	8,581	14.15
ANP	Saqib Ullah Khan	8,548	14.09
PPP	Muhammad Sharif	5,920	9.76
TLP	Naushad Khan	3,898	6.43
Independent	Shakeel Afridi	2,976	4.91
QWP	Israr Khan	359	0.59
Independent	Others (2 Independents)	326	0.54
Turnout		63,386	46.80
Valid ballots		60,648	95.68
Rejected ballots		2,738	4.32
Majority		5,264	8.68
Registered electors		1,35,445	
PTI win (new seat)			

== See also ==
- PK-74 Peshawar-III
- PK-76 Peshawar-V
