= PK-40 Mansehra-V =

Pakistani electoral district

- Constituency for the Khyber Pakhtunkhwa Assembly
- Region: Baffa Pakhal Tehsil (partly) including Baffa town of Mansehra District

Current constituency
- Party: Pakistan Muslim League (N)
- Member: Sardar Shahjahan Yousaf
- Created from: PK-55 Mansehra-III (2002-2018); PK-34 Mansehra-V (2018-2023)

PK-40 Mansehra-V (پی کے-40 مانسہرہ-5) is a constituency for the Khyber Pakhtunkhwa Assembly of the Khyber Pakhtunkhwa province of Pakistan.

== See also ==
- PK-39 Mansehra-IV
- PK-41 Torghar
