= PK-101 Bannu-III =

Provincial constituency in Pakistan

- Constituency for the Khyber Pakhtunkhwa Assembly
- Region: Gumatti Tehsil, Baka Khel Tehsil and Tehsil Miryan of Bannu District

Current constituency
- Seats: 1
- Party: JUI(F)
- Member: Adnan Khan
- Created from: PK-72 Bannu-III (before 2018) PK-89 Bannu-III (2018-2023)

PK-101 Bannu-III (پی کے-101 بنوں-3) is a constituency for the Khyber Pakhtunkhwa Assembly of the Khyber Pakhtunkhwa province of Pakistan.

== See also ==
- PK-100 Bannu-II
- PK-102 Bannu-IV
