= PK-39 Mansehra-IV =

Pakistani electoral district

- Constituency for the Khyber Pakhtunkhwa Assembly
- Region: Baffa Pakhal Tehsil (partly) Oghi and Darband Tehsils of Mansehra District

Current constituency
- Party: Pakistan Tehreek-e-Insaf
- Member(s): Nawabzada Farid Salahuddin
- Created from: PK-56 Mansehra-IV (2002-2018); PK-33 Mansehra-IV (2018-2023)

PK-39 Mansehra-IV (پی کے-39 مانسہرہ-4) is a constituency for the Khyber Pakhtunkhwa Assembly of the Khyber Pakhtunkhwa province of Pakistan.

== See also ==
- PK-38 Mansehra-III
- PK-40 Mansehra-V
