= PK-89 Nowshera-V =

Pakistani electoral district

- Constituency for the Khyber Pakhtunkhwa Assembly
- Region: Pabbi Tehsil (partly) of Nowshera District

Current constituency
- Party: Pakistan Tehreek-e-Insaf
- Member(s): Khaliq-ur-Rehman
- Created from: PK-12 Nowshera-I (2002-2018); PK-65 Nowshera-V (2018-2023)

PK-89 Nowshera-V (پی کے-89 نوشہرہ-5) is a constituency for the Khyber Pakhtunkhwa Assembly of the Khyber Pakhtunkhwa province of Pakistan.

== See also ==
- PK-88 Nowshera-IV
- PK-90 Kohat-I
