= PK-85 Nowshera-I =

Pakistani electoral district

- Constituency for the Khyber Pakhtunkhwa Assembly
- Region: Nowshera Tehsil (partly) and Jehangira Tehsil (partly) of Nowshera District

Current constituency
- Party: Pakistan Tehreek-e-Insaf
- Member(s): Muhammad Ibrahim Khan Khattak
- Created from: PK-14 Nowshera-III (2002-2018); PK-61 Nowshera-I (2018-2023)

PK-85 Nowshera-I (پی کے-85 نوشہرہ-1) is a constituency for the Khyber Pakhtunkhwa Assembly of the Khyber Pakhtunkhwa province of Pakistan.

== See also ==
- PK-84 Peshawar-XIII
- PK-86 Nowshera-II
