= PK-76 Peshawar-V =

Pakistani electoral district

- Constituency for the Khyber Pakhtunkhwa Assembly
- Region: Badbher, Chimkani and Peshtakhara Tehsils (partly) of Peshawar District

Current constituency
- Party: Awami National Party
- Member: Khush Dil Khan
- Created from: PK-11 Peshawar-XI (2002-2018); PK-70 Peshawar-V (2018-2023)

PK-76 Peshawar-V (پی کے-76 پشاور-5) is a constituency for the Khyber Pakhtunkhwa Assembly of the Khyber Pakhtunkhwa province of Pakistan.

== See also ==
- PK-75 Peshawar-IV
- PK-77 Peshawar-VI
