= 2018 Khyber Pakhtunkhwa provincial election =

Pakistani provincial election

- 25 July 2018

All 124 seats in the Khyber Pakhtunkhwa Assembly 63 seats needed for a majority
- Opinion polls
- Turnout: 45.52% (▲0.78%pp)
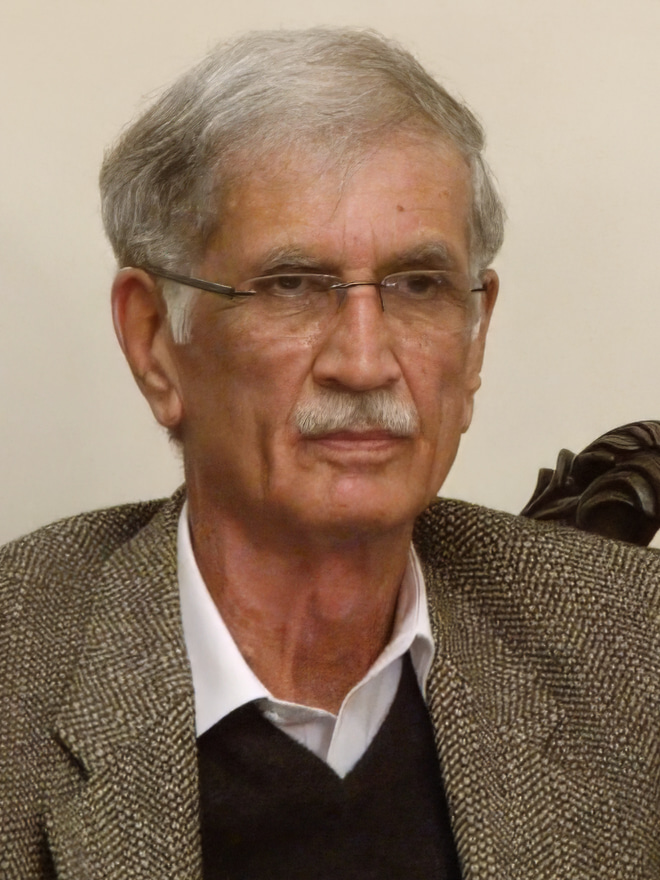

	First party	Second party	Third party
Leader	Pervez Khattak	Akram Khan Durrani	Haider Khan Hoti
Party	PTI	MMA	ANP
Leader's seat	Nowshera-I; Nowshera-IV	Bannu-IV	Mardan-VI
Last election	48 seats, 19.31%	23 seats, 22.15%	5 seats, 10.34%
Seats won	85	13	9
Seat change	▲37	▼10	▲4
Popular vote	2,132,517	1,127,707	803,895
Percentage	32.32%	17.08%	12.19%
Swing	▲12.01pp	▼5.07pp	▲1.85pp
- Map of Khyber Pakhtunkhwa Showing Assembly constituencies and winning Parties
Chief Minister before election
Pervez Khattak
PTI
Elected Chief Minister
Mahmood Khan
PTI

Provincial elections were held in the Pakistani province of Khyber Pakhtunkhwa on 25 July 2018 to elect the members of the 11th Provincial Assembly of Khyber Pakhtunkhwa, alongside nationwide general elections and three other provincial elections in Sindh, Balochistan and Punjab. The remaining two territories of Pakistan, AJK and Gilgit-Baltistan, were ineligible to vote due to their disputed status.

== Background ==
In the 2013 elections, Pakistan Tehreek-e-Insaf, led by former cricketer Imran Khan emerged as the largest party in the province with 48 seats. While this was a considerably higher number than the second largest party, (Jamiat Ulema-e-Islam (F), with 16 seats), it was still 15 seats short of a majority government.

To overcome this, Pakistan Tehreek-e-Insaf formed a coalition government with Jamaat-e-Islami and the Qaumi Watan Party, giving them 15 extra seats. As well as this, 9 out of the 14 independents elected joined PTI, giving them a comfortable majority in the assembly.

Following this, Pervez Khattak was elected as Chief Minister of Khyber Pakhtunkhwa, securing 84 out of 124 votes.

However, in 2017, PTI ousted QWP from the ruling coalition over allegations of corruption. There was considerable mistrust with the other alliance partner, JI, during the tenure as well. It, too, left the coalition with less than 40 days to go in the government's tenure.

With just a few weeks remaining till the assembly completed its term, PTI expelled 20 of its MPs over allegations of horse-trading in the senate elections. A move which made the party's government susceptible to a no-confidence motion, but the incumbent opposition refrained from doing so.

== Pre-election violence ==
On 10 July, there was a suicide bombing attack on political rally of Awami National Party (ANP) in YakaToot neighborhood of Peshawar in which fourteen people were killed and sixty five injured. Among the killed was ANP's Khyber Pakhtunkhwa Assembly candidate, Haroon Bilour. Bilour was son of Bashir Ahmad Bilour who was also killed in a suicide bombing attack in December 2012. Elections for Constituency PK-78 were postponed to an disclosed date by the Election Commission. On 12 July, a spokesperson for former Member of National Assembly Alhaj Shah Jee Gul Afridi was killed and another citizen was injured after unidentified men opened fire at the spokesperson's car in Peshawar.

On 13 July, 4 citizens were killed and 10 were injured after a planted bomb exploded near the car of JUI-F candidate Akram Khan Durrani in Bannu.

== Results ==
=== Results by party ===
85	13	9	6	5	1	3
PTI	MMA	ANP	PML(N)	PPP	PML(Q)	IND

Vote Share of different parties in the election.
1. PTI (34.1%)
2. MMA (18.0%)
3. ANP (12.8%)
4. PML-N (10.5%)
5. PPP (9.67%)
6. IND (14.9%)
Seat Share of different parties in the election.
1. PTI (68.5%)
2. MMA (10.5%)
3. ANP (7.26%)
4. PML-N (4.84%)
5. PPP (4.03%)
6. PML(Q) (0.81%)
7. IND (1.61%)

2018 Khyber Pakhtunkhwa provincial election
Party	%	Votes	Seats				-/+
Party	%	Votes	General	Women	Non-Muslims	Total	-/+
Pakistan Tehreek-e-Insaf	34.09	2,132,364	67*	16	2	85	▲28
Muttahida Majlis-e-Amal	18.01	1,126,445	10	2	1	13	new party
Awami National Party	12.85	803,895	7	2	0	9	▲2
Pakistan Muslim League (N)	10.47	655,391	5	1	0	6	▼7
Pakistan Peoples Party	9.67	604,930	4	1	0	5	▲5
Pakistan Muslim League (Q)	0.00	0	1**	0	0	1	▲1
Independents	14.89	931,989	3	0	0	3	▼9
Elections postponed			2	0	0	2	
Total	100	6,255,014	99	22	3	124	
*2 candidates were elected as independents but later joined the PTI **The PML(Q)'s sole member was elected as an independent but later joined the party

=== Results by division ===
Division	Total seats	PTI	MMA	ANP	PML(N)	PPP	IND
Malakand	24	17	2	3	0	2	0
Hazara	18	9	0	1	4	0	4
Mardan	13	11	0	1	1	0	0
Peshawar	24	21	0	2	0	0	0
Kohat	7	3	3	0	0	0	1
Bannu	7	3	3	0	0	1	0
D I Khan	6	1	2	0	0	1	1
Total	99	65	10	7	5	4	6

=== Results by district ===
Division	District	Seats	PTI	MMA	ANP	PML(N)	PPP	IND
Malakand	Chitral	1	0	1	0	0	0	0
Malakand	Swat	8	8	0	0	0	0	0
Malakand	Upper Dir	3	0	1	0	0	2	0
Malakand	Lower Dir	5	4	0	1	0	0	0
Malakand	Malakand	2	2	0	0	0	0	0
Malakand	Buner	3	2	0	1	0	0	0
Malakand	Shangla	2	1	0	1	0	0	0
Hazara	Upper Kohistan	1	0	0	0	0	0	1
Hazara	Lower Kohistan	1	0	0	0	0	0	1
Hazara	Kolai Palas	1	0	0	0	0	0	1
Hazara	Battagram	2	2	0	0	0	0	0
Hazara	Mansehra	5	2	0	0	3	0	0
Hazara	Torghar	1	0	0	1	0	0	0
Hazara	Abbottabad	4	3	0	0	1	0	0
Hazara	Haripur	3	2	0	0	0	0	1
Mardan	Swabi	5	5	0	0	0	0	0
Mardan	Mardan	8	6	0	1	1	0	0
Peshawar	Charsadda	5	4	0	1	0	0	0
Peshawar	Nowshera	5	5	0	0	0	0	0
Peshawar	Peshawar	14	12	0	1	0	0	0
Kohat	Kohat	3	1	1	0	0	0	1
Kohat	Hangu	2	2	0	0	0	0	0
Kohat	Karak	2	0	2	0	0	0	0
Bannu	Bannu	4	2	1	0	0	1	0
Bannu	Lakki Marwat	3	1	2	0	0	0	0
Dera Ismail Khan	Tank	1	0	1	0	0	0	0
Dera Ismail Khan	Dera Ismail Khan	5	1	1	0	0	1	1
Total		99	65	10	7	5	4	6

=== Results by constituency ===
District	Constituency		Winner				Runner Up				Margin	Turnout %
District	No.	Name	Candidate	Party	Votes	%	Candidate	Party	Votes	%	Margin	Turnout %
Chitral	PK-1	Chitral	Hidayat ur Rehman	MMA	46,050	28.81	Israr ud Din	PTI	40,556	25.38	5,494	61.29
Swat	PK-2	Swat-I	Sharafat Ali	PTI	21,099	31.06	Jafar Shah	ANP	13,187	19.41	7,912	46.09
Swat	PK-3	Swat-II	Haider Ali Khan	PTI	18,569	30.76	Sardar Khan	PML(N)	13,103	21.71	5,466	43.83
Swat	PK-4	Swat-III	Azizullah Khan	PTI	14,276	25.37	Amir Muqam	PML(N)	14,208	25.25	68	40.97
Swat	PK-5	Swat-IV	Fazal Hakim	PTI	22,497	37.42	Muhammad Amin	MMA	12,621	20.99	9,876	39.91
Swat	PK-6	Swat-V	Amjad Ali	PTI	24,239	41.75	Sher Shah	ANP	10,275	17.70	13,964	40.13
Swat	PK-7	Swat-VI	Amjad Ali	PTI	19,461	35.24	Waqar Ahmad Khan	ANP	13,681	24.78	5,780	37.30
Swat	PK-8	Swat-VII	Muhibullah Khan	PTI	21,825	39.06	Said Akbar Khan	PPP	10,653	19.07	11,172	41.01
Swat	PK-9	Swat-VIII	Mehmood Khan	PTI	25,697	48.88	Muhammad Ayub Khan	ANP	11,509	21.89	14,188	39.21
Upper Dir	PK-10	Upper Dir-I	Malik Badshah Saleh	PPP	21,201	29.71	Muhammad Ali	MMA	19,724	27.64	1,477	49.51
Upper Dir	PK-11	Upper Dir-II	Sahibzada Sanaullah	PPP	22,334	33.72	Azam Khan	MMA	17,916	27.05	4,418	46.13
Upper Dir	PK-12	Upper Dir-III	Inayatullah Khan	MMA	27,599	38.55	Naveed Anjum Khan	PTI	19,287	26.94	8,312	50.27
Lower Dir	PK-13	Lower Dir-I	Muhammad Azam Khan	PTI	21,683	33.26	Shad Nawaz Khan	MMA	18,832	28.83	2,851	47.55
Lower Dir	PK-14	Lower Dir-II	Humayun Khan	PTI	19,619	26.03	Bakht Baidar	PPP	18,598	24.68	1,021	48.79
Lower Dir	PK-15	Lower Dir-III	Shafi Ullah	PTI	21,338	33.13	Mehmood Zeb Khan	PPP	17,564	27.27	3,774	53.23
Lower Dir	PK-16	Lower Dir-IV	Bahadar Khan	ANP	19,021	37.83	Izaz ul Mulk	MMA	16,301	32.42	2,720	46.11
Lower Dir	PK-17	Lower Dir-V	Liaqat Ali Khan	PTI	22,886	39.97	Saeed Gul	MMA	18,850	32.92	4,036	41.12
Malakand	PK-18	Malakand-I	Shakeel Ahmad	PTI	33,495	36.66	Muhammad Humayun Khan	PPP	25,789	28.23	7,706	46.48
Malakand	PK-19	Malakand-II	Musavir Khan	PTI	34,549	37.98	Syed Muhammad Ali Shah Bacha	PPP	27,800	30.56	6,749	51.02
Buner	PK-20	Buner-I	Riaz Khan	PTI	16,026	28.33	Bakht Jehan Khan	IND	13,337	23.57	2,689	35.27
Buner	PK-21	Buner-II	Syed Fakhr e Jehan	PTI	16,613	29.54	Nasir Ali	MMA	16,309	28.99	304	41.27
Buner	PK-22	Buner-III	Sardar Hussain Babak	ANP	23,146	35.88	Raj Wali Khan	MMA	17,414	26.99	5,732	49.38
Shangla	PK-23	Shangla-I	Shaukat Ali Yousafzai	PTI	17,712	25.84	Muhammad Rashad Khan	PML(N)	16,007	23.35	1,705	35.53
Shangla	PK-24	Shangla-II	Faisal Zeb	ANP	15,060	25.96	Abdul Maula	PTI	14,695	25.33	365	34.60
Upper Kohistan	PK-25	Upper Kohistan	Muhammad Dedar	IND	7,018	31.22	Muhammad Idrees	MMA	5,001	22.25	2,017	41.28
Lower Kohistan	PK-26	Lower Kohistan	Abdul Ghaffar	IND	17,450	59.33	Afsar	IND	11,609	39.47	5,841	49.30
Kolai Palas	PK-27	Kolai Palas	Mufti Ubaid ur Rahman	IND	4,973	41.71	Muhammad Iqbal Khan	PTI	2,841	23.83	2,132	32.21
Battagram	PK-28	Battagram-I	Zubair Khan	PTI	14,354	41.69	Shah Hussain Khan	MMA	12,611	36.63	1,743	32.72
Battagram	PK-29	Battagram-II	Taj Muhammad	PTI	21,106	37.82	Atta Muhammad	PRHP	17,349	31.09	3,757	39.04
Mansehra	PK-30	Mansehra-I	Mian Zia Ur Rehman	PML(N)	28,997	31.33	Ahmed Hussain Shah	PPP	28,747	31.06	250	50.18
Mansehra	PK-31	Mansehra-II	Babar Saleem Swati	PTI	26,734	35.86	Zahoor Ahmed	PML(N)	21,962	29.46	4,772	50.01
Mansehra	PK-32	Mansehra-III	Naeem Sakhi Tanoli	PML(N)	22,660	25.54	Zaid Chanzeb	PTI	20,678	23.30	1,982	47.90
Mansehra	PK-33	Mansehra-IV	Nawabzada Farid Salahuddin	PTI	21,611	31.34	Ali Muhammad Khan	PML(N)	11,762	17.05	9,849	37.91
Mansehra	PK-34	Mansehra-V	Sardar Muhammad Yousuf	PML(N)	42,945	43.03	Shahzada Muhammad Gushtasap Khan	IND	33,511	33.58	9,434	48.07
Torghar	PK-35	Torghar	Laiq Muhammad Khan	ANP	11,728	37.51	Shokat Ali Khan	MMA	8,022	25.65	3,706	36.50
Abbottabad	PK-36	Abbottabad-I	Nazir Ahmed Abbasi	PTI	37,349	31.38	Sardar Fareed Ahmed Khan	IND	33,072	27.78	4,277	51.98
Abbottabad	PK-37	Abbottabad-II	Sardar Aurangzeb Nalota	PML(N)	38,927	33.43	Waqar Nabi	PTI	29,214	25.09	9,713	49.68
Abbottabad	PK-38	Abbottabad-III	Qalandar Khan Lodhi	PTI	29,703	31.14	Muhammad Arshad	PML(N)	26,550	27.83	3,153	48.86
Abbottabad	PK-39	Abbottabad-IV	Mushtaq Ahmed Ghani	PTI	28,577	35.73	Inayatullah Khan Jadoon	PML(N)	19,351	24.19	9,226	51.57
Haripur	PK-40	Haripur-I	Akbar Ayub Khan	PTI	66,988	54.51	Qazi Muhammad Asad Khan	PML(N)	46,228	37.61	20,760	49.65
Haripur	PK-41	Haripur-II	Arshad Ayub Khan	PTI	56,421	47.42	Raja Faisal Zaman	PML(N)	39,362	33.08	17,059	56.92
Haripur	PK-42	Haripur-III	Faisal Zaman	IND	32,877	35.54	Gohar Nawaz Khan	IND	24,147	26.10	8,730	50.85
Swabi	PK-43	Swabi-I	Rangez Ahmad	PTI	26,413	36.39	Sajad Khan Jadoon	MMA	13,656	18.82	12,757	43.75
Swabi	PK-44	Swabi-II	Asad Qaisar	PTI	31,912	37.41	Gul Zaman Shah	MMA	20,959	24.57	10,953	42.25
Swabi	PK-45	Swabi-III	Abdul Karim	PTI	25,188	31.19	Muhammad Amin	MMA	15,122	18.72	10,066	45.46
Swabi	PK-46	Swabi-IV	Mohammad Ali Tarakai	PTI	27,431	34.39	Muhammad Ayaz	ANP	26,114	32.74	1,317	46.55
Swabi	PK-47	Swabi-V	Shahram Khan	PTI	34,851	45.36	Ameer Rahman	ANP	21,161	27.54	13,690	45.13
Mardan	PK-48	Mardan-I	Malik Shaukat Ali	PTI	22,095	30.25	Muhammad Farooq Khan	ANP	18,401	25.19	3,694	49.21
Mardan	PK-49	Mardan-II	Tufail Anjum	PTI	24,497	33.50	Adnan Khan	IND	12,536	17.14	11,961	46.08
Mardan	PK-50	Mardan-III	Muhammad Atif	PTI	25,888	38.79	Muhammad Haroon Khan	ANP	11,814	17.70	14,074	43.88
Mardan	PK-51	Mardan-IV	Amir Farzand Khan	PTI	19,460	29.97	Himayat Ullah Mayar	ANP	18,533	28.54	927	43.79
Mardan	PK-52	Mardan-V	Muhammad Zahir Shah	PTI	27,006	42.22	Ali Khan	ANP	21,138	33.05	5,868	44.78
Mardan	PK-53	Mardan-VI	Haidar Khan Hoti	ANP	29,206	40.79	Sayed Umar Farooq	PTI	22,465	31.38	6,741	48.56
Mardan	PK-54	Mardan-VII	Iftikhar Ali Mushwani	PTI	22,537	28.97	Sher Afghan Khan	ANP	17,290	22.08	5,247	52.30
Mardan	PK-55	Mardan-VIII	Jamshid Khan	PML(N)	22,539	29.62	Adil Nawaz	PTI	20,025	26.31	2,514	51.24
Charsadda	PK-56	Charsadda-I	Khalid Khan	PTI	20,310	27.11	Gohar Ali	ANP	20,129	26.87	181	46.21
Charsadda	PK-57	Charsadda-II	Shakeel Bashir Khan	ANP	27,024	34.62	Arshad Ali	QWP	21,235	27.21	5,789	45.96
Charsadda	PK-58	Charsadda-III	Sultan Mohammad Khan	PTI	28,915	37.28	Aimal Wali Khan	ANP	22,141	28.55	6,774	45.27
Charsadda	PK-59	Charsadda-IV	Fazle Shakoor Khan	PTI	30,252	36.28	Qasim Ali	ANP	19,792	23.80	10,460	44.06
Charsadda	PK-60	Charsadda-V	Mohammad Arif	PTI	20,759	31.40	Musammir Shah	MMA	13,916	21.05	6,843	43.41
Nowshera	PK-61	Nowshera-I	Pervez Khattak	PTI	20,676	31.99	Pervez Ahmad Khan	ANP	16,078	24.88	4,598	48.41
Nowshera	PK-62	Nowshera-II	Muhammad Idrees	PTI	40,504	48.38	Khalil Abbas	ANP	19,608	23.42	20,896	51.15
Nowshera	PK-63	Nowshera-III	Jamshid Uddin	PTI	24,832	40.39	Ikhtiar Wali Khan	PML(N)	13,987	22.75	10,845	43.93
Nowshera	PK-64	Nowshera-IV	Pervez Khattak	PTI	38,276	47.80	Muhammad Shahid	ANP	19,659	24.55	18,617	51.64
Nowshera	PK-65	Nowshera-V	Khaliq-ur-Rehman	PTI	36,949	51.89	Mian Iftikhar Hussain	ANP	21,912	30.74	15,037	51.01
Peshawar	PK-66	Peshawar-I	Mehmood Jan	PTI	19,146	34.66	Hashmat Khan	MMA	11,434	20.70	7,712	46.37
Peshawar	PK-67	Peshawar-II	Arbab Muhammad Wasim Khan	PTI	16,922	31.84	Asif Iqbal Daduzai	MMA	11,671	21.96	5,251	46.79
Peshawar	PK-68	Peshawar-III	Arbab Jahandad Khan	PTI	22,585	39.57	Malik Tamash Khan	PPP	11,819	20.71	10,766	47.16
Peshawar	PK-69	Peshawar-IV	Syed Muhammad Ishtiaq	PTI	17,652	29.11	Arbab Muhammad Usman Khan	IND	12,388	20.43	5,264	46.80
Peshawar	PK-70	Peshawar-V	Khush Dil Khan	ANP	14,871	31.61	Shah Farman	PTI	14,684	31.21	187	45.59
Peshawar	PK-71	Peshawar-VI	Shah Farman	PTI	17,388	35.65	Sifat Ullah	PML(N)	9,232	18.93	8,156	38.29
Peshawar	PK-72	Peshawar-VII	Fahim Ahmad	PTI	15,447	40.00	Ashfaq Ahmad Khalil	ANP	5,892	15.26	9,555	39.36
Peshawar	PK-73	Peshawar-VIII	Taimur Saleem Khan Jhagra	PTI	15,465	52.32	Aman Ullah	MMA	3,810	12.89	11,655	39.99
Peshawar	PK-74	Peshawar-IX	Pir Fida Muhammad	PTI	19,379	43.47	Muhammad Ibrar	ANP	8,271	18.55	11,108	40.94
Peshawar	PK-75	Peshawar-X	Wajid Ullah Khan	PTI	27,686	51.67	Syed Aqil Shah	ANP	8,460	15.80	19,226	40.94
Peshawar	PK-76	Peshawar-XI	Asif Khan	PTI	19,054	49.13	Hidayat Ullah Khan	ANP	6,240	16.14	12,814	41.72
Peshawar	PK-77	Peshawar-XII	Kamran Khan Bangash	PTI	30,427	53.95	Syed Zahir Ali Shah	PPP	9,272	16.44	21,155	41.57
Peshawar	PK-78	Peshawar-XIII	Election Postponed									
Peshawar	PK-79	Peshawar-XIV	Fazal Elahi	PTI	18,065	39.88	Malik Naushad Khan	MMA	5,776	12.75	12,289	41.46
Kohat	PK-80	Kohat-I	Amjad Khan Afridi	IND	29,279	39.98	Aftab Alam Afridi	PTI	26,704	36.47	2,575	44.95
Kohat	PK-81	Kohat-II	Shah Dad Khan	MMA	17,631	29.01	Imtiaz Shahid	PTI	16,599	27.31	1,032	37.69
Kohat	PK-82	Kohat-III	Zia Ullah Khan Bangash	PTI	21,074	36.14	Syed Iftikhar Hussain Shah	IND	14,786	25.36	6,288	35.60
Hangu	PK-83	Hangu-I	Shah Faisal Khan	PTI	14,130	30.20	Ubaid Ullah	MMA	10,210	21.82	3,920	32.88
Hangu	PK-84	Hangu-II	Muhammad Zahoor	PTI	10,171	31.89	Jahanzaib	MMA	7,915	24.82	2,256	26.22
Karak	PK-85	Karak-I	Mian Nisar Gul	MMA	30,253	30.18	Farid Khan Toofan	PTI	28,879	28.81	1,374	48.42
Karak	PK-86	Karak-II	Zafar Azam	MMA	35,846	37.38	Malik Qasim Khan Khattak	PTI	32,866	34.27	2,980	51.81
Bannu	PK-87	Bannu-I	Sher Azam Khan	PPP	21,160	37.74	Zahid Ullah Khan	PTI	18,242	32.54	2,918	42.78
Bannu	PK-88	Bannu-II	Pakhtoon Yar Khan	PTI	30,535	51.39	Zahid Akram Durrani	MMA	26,290	44.25	4,245	43.80
Bannu	PK-89	Bannu-III	Shah Muhammad Khan	PTI	11,643	21.47	Sahib Zaman	IND	10,363	19.11	1,280	41.51
Bannu	PK-90	Bannu-IV	Akram Khan Durrani	MMA	32,795	46.93	Haji Malik Adnan Khan	PTI	32,767	46.89	28	42.68
Lakki Marwat	PK-91	Lakki Marwat-I	Munawar Khan Advocate	MMA	25,242	34.33	Johar Muhammad	PTI	21,798	29.65	3,444	51.14
Lakki Marwat	PK-92	Lakki Marwat-II	Hisham Inamullah Khan	PTI	38,476	52.44	Noor Saleem Malik	MMA	28,450	38.77	10,026	50.66
Lakki Marwat	PK-93	Lakki Marwat-III	Anwar Hayat Khan	MMA	16,781	30.75	Tariq Saeed	PTI	16,047	29.41	734	47.92
Tank	PK-94	Tank	Mahmood Ahmad Khan	MMA	27,911	36.32	Ghulam Qadir Khan	ANP	15,725	20.47	12,186	44.57
Dera Ismail Khan	PK-95	Dera Ismail Khan-I	Ehtesham Javed Akber Khan	IND	44,557	44.59	Makhdoom Mureed Qasim Shah	IND	39,865	39.89	4,692	63.23
Dera Ismail Khan	PK-96	Dera Ismail Khan-II	Ahmad Kundi	PPP	18,416	27.34	Samiullah	IND	16,692	25.14	1,724	55.95
Dera Ismail Khan	PK-97	Dera Ismail Khan-III	Ali Amin Gandapur	PTI	31,197	43.92	Qayyum Nawaz	PPP	14,645	20.62	16,552	47.30
Dera Ismail Khan	PK-98	Dera Ismail Khan-IV	Lutf ur Rehman	MMA	20,010	29.96	Fakher Ullah Khan	IND	18,922	28.33	1,088	58.83
Dera Ismail Khan	PK-99	Dera Ismail Khan-V	Election Postponed									

=== Members elected on reserved seats ===
Reserved Seats	Party	Member
For Women	Pakistan Tehreek-e-Insaf	Nadia Sher
For Women	Pakistan Tehreek-e-Insaf	Maliha Ali Asghar Khan
For Women	Pakistan Tehreek-e-Insaf	Aisha Naeem
For Women	Pakistan Tehreek-e-Insaf	Momina Basit
For Women	Pakistan Tehreek-e-Insaf	Sumera Shams
For Women	Pakistan Tehreek-e-Insaf	Rabia Basri
For Women	Pakistan Tehreek-e-Insaf	Asiya Asad
For Women	Pakistan Tehreek-e-Insaf	Sajida Haneef
For Women	Pakistan Tehreek-e-Insaf	Somi Falak Naz
For Women	Pakistan Tehreek-e-Insaf	Aisha Bano
For Women	Pakistan Tehreek-e-Insaf	Sitara Afreen
For Women	Pakistan Tehreek-e-Insaf	Zeenat Bibi
For Women	Pakistan Tehreek-e-Insaf	Asia Khattak
For Women	Pakistan Tehreek-e-Insaf	Maria Fatima
For Women	Pakistan Tehreek-e-Insaf	Sumaiyah Bibi
For Women	Pakistan Tehreek-e-Insaf	Madiha Nisar
For Women	Muttahida Majlis-e-Amal	Rehana Ismail
For Women	Muttahida Majlis-e-Amal	Humaira Khatoon
For Women	Awami National Party	Shagufta Malik
For Women	Awami National Party	Shahida Waheed
For Women	Pakistan Muslim League (N)	Sobia Shahid
For Women	Pakistan Peoples Party	Nighat Orakzai
For Non-Muslims	Pakistan Tehreek-e-Insaf	Ravi Kumar
For Non-Muslims	Pakistan Tehreek-e-Insaf	Wazir Zada
For Non-Muslims	Muttahida Majlis-e-Amal	Ranjeet Singh

== See also ==
- List of members of the 11th Provincial Assembly of Khyber Pakhtunkhwa (2018–2023)
- 2018 Pakistani general election
- 2018 Punjab provincial election
- 2018 Sindh provincial election
- 2018 Balochistan provincial election
