= List of members of the 11th Provincial Assembly of Khyber Pakhtunkhwa (2018–2023) =

This is the list of current members of the Provincial Assembly of Khyber Pakhtunkhwa elected following the 2018 provincial election.

After the merger of FATA into Khyber Pakhtunkhwa, the number of members of the Assembly rose from 124 to 145, adding 16 general seats, 4 reserved seats for women and 1 reserved seat for non-Muslims. Elections on the 16 general seats were held on 20 July 2019.

The 11th Provincial Assembly was dissolved on 18 January 2023.

== Members ==
Constituency	District	Party	Member	Assumed office
PK-1 (Chitral-I)	Upper Chitral & Lower Chitral	Muttahida Majlis-e-Amal	Hidayat ur Rehman	13 August 2018
PK-2 (Swat-I)	Swat	Pakistan Tehreek-e-Insaf	Sharafat Ali	13 August 2018
PK-3 (Swat-II)	Swat	Pakistan Muslim League (N)	Sardar Khan	24 October 2018
PK-4 (Swat-III)	Swat	Pakistan Tehreek-e-Insaf	Azizullah Khan	13 August 2018
PK-5 (Swat-IV)	Swat	Pakistan Tehreek-e-Insaf	Fazal Hakim	13 August 2018
PK-6 (Swat-V)	Swat	Pakistan Tehreek-e-Insaf	Amjad Ali	13 August 2018
PK-7 (Swat-VI)	Swat	Pakistan Tehreek-e-Insaf	Fazal-e-Maula	18 July 2022
PK-8 (Swat-VII)	Swat	Pakistan Tehreek-e-Insaf	Muhibullah Khan	13 August 2018
PK-9 (Swat-VIII)	Swat	Pakistan Tehreek-e-Insaf	Mehmood Khan	13 August 2018
PK-10 (Upper Dir-I)	Upper Dir	Pakistan Peoples Party	Malik Badshah Saleh	13 August 2018
PK-11 (Upper Dir-II)	Upper Dir	Pakistan Peoples Party	Sahibzada Sanaullah	13 August 2018
PK-12 (Upper Dir-III)	Upper Dir	Muttahida Majlis-e-Amal	Inayatullah Khan	13 August 2018
PK-13 (Lower Dir-I)	Lower Dir	Pakistan Tehreek-e-Insaf	Muhammad Azam Khan	13 August 2018
PK-14 (Lower Dir-II)	Lower Dir	Pakistan Tehreek-e-Insaf	Humayun Khan	13 August 2018
PK-15 (Lower Dir-III)	Lower Dir	Pakistan Tehreek-e-Insaf	Shafi Ullah	13 August 2018
PK-16 (Lower Dir-IV)	Lower Dir	Awami National Party	Bahadar Khan	13 August 2018
PK-17 (Lower Dir-V)	Lower Dir	Pakistan Tehreek-e-Insaf	Liaqat Ali Khan	13 August 2018
PK-18 (Malakand Protected Area-I)	Malakand	Pakistan Tehreek-e-Insaf	Shakeel Ahmad	13 August 2018
PK-19 (Malakand Protected Area-II)	Malakand	Pakistan Tehreek-e-Insaf	Musavir Khan	13 August 2018
PK-20 (Buner-I)	Buner	Pakistan Tehreek-e-Insaf	Riaz Khan	13 August 2018
PK-21 (Buner-II)	Buner	Pakistan Tehreek-e-Insaf	Syed Fakhr e Jehan	13 August 2018
PK-22 (Buner-III)	Buner	Awami National Party	Sardar Hussain Babak	13 August 2018
PK-23 (Shangla-I)	Shangla	Pakistan Tehreek-e-Insaf	Shaukat Ali Yousafzai	15 October 2018
PK-24 (Shangla-II)	Shangla	Awami National Party	Faisal Zeb	13 August 2018
PK-25 (Kohistan)	Upper Kohistan	Pakistan Tehreek-e-Insaf	Muhammad Dedar	13 August 2018
PK-26 (Kohistan Lower)	Lower Kohistan	Pakistan Tehreek-e-Insaf	Abdul Ghaffar	13 August 2018
PK-27 (Kolai Palas Kohistan)	Kolai-Palas	Pakistan Muslim League (Q)	Mufti Ubaid ur Rahman	13 August 2018
PK-28 (Battagram-I)	Battagram	Pakistan Tehreek-e-Insaf	Zubair Khan	13 August 2018
PK-29 (Battagram-II)	Battagram	Pakistan Tehreek-e-Insaf	Taj Muhammad	13 August 2018
PK-30 (Mansehra-I)	Mansehra	Pakistan Tehreek-e-Insaf	Ahmed Hussain Shah	March 15, 2019
PK-31 (Mansehra-II)	Mansehra	Pakistan Tehreek-e-Insaf	Babar Saleem Swati	13 August 2018
PK-32 (Mansehra-III)	Mansehra	Pakistan Muslim League (N)	Naeem Sakhi Tanoli	13 August 2018
PK-33 (Mansehra-IV)	Mansehra	Pakistan Tehreek-e-Insaf	Nawabzada Farid Salahuddin	13 August 2018
PK-34 (Mansehra-V)	Mansehra	Pakistan Muslim League (N)	Sardar Muhammad Yousuf	13 August 2018
PK-35 (Torghar)	Torghar	Awami National Party	Laiq Muhammad Khan	13 August 2018
PK-36 (Abbottabad-I)	Abbottabad	Pakistan Tehreek-e-Insaf	Nazir Ahmed Abbasi	13 August 2018
PK-37 (Abbottabad-II)	Abbottabad	Pakistan Muslim League (N)	Sardar Aurangzeb Nalota	13 August 2018
PK-38 (Abbottabad-III)	Abbottabad	Pakistan Tehreek-e-Insaf	Qalandar Khan Lodhi	13 August 2018
PK-39 (Abbottabad-IV)	Abbottabad	Pakistan Tehreek-e-Insaf	Mushtaq Ahmed Ghani	13 August 2018
PK-40 (Haripur-I)	Haripur	Pakistan Tehreek-e-Insaf	Akbar Ayub Khan	13 August 2018
PK-41 (Haripur-II)	Haripur	Pakistan Tehreek-e-Insaf	Arshad Ayub Khan	13 August 2018
PK-42 (Haripur-III)	Haripur	Pakistan Tehreek-e-Insaf	Faisal Zaman	13 August 2018
PK-43 (Swabi-I)	Swabi	Pakistan Tehreek-e-Insaf	Rangez Ahmad	13 August 2018
PK-44 (Swabi-II)	Swabi	Pakistan Tehreek-e-Insaf	Aqibullah Khan	24 October 2018
PK-45 (Swabi-III)	Swabi	Pakistan Tehreek-e-Insaf	Abdul Karim	13 August 2018
PK-46 (Swabi-IV)	Swabi	Pakistan Tehreek-e-Insaf	Mohammad Ali Tarakai	13 August 2018
PK-47 (Swabi-V)	Swabi	Pakistan Tehreek-e-Insaf	Shahram Khan	13 August 2018
PK-48 (Mardan-I)	Mardan	Pakistan Tehreek-e-Insaf	Malik Shaukat Ali	13 August 2018
PK-49 (Mardan-II)	Mardan	Pakistan Tehreek-e-Insaf	Tufail Anjum	13 August 2018
PK-50 (Mardan-III)	Mardan	Pakistan Tehreek-e-Insaf	Muhammad Atif	13 August 2018
PK-51 (Mardan-IV)	Mardan	Pakistan Tehreek-e-Insaf	Amir Farzand Khan	13 August 2018
PK-52 (Mardan-V)	Mardan	Pakistan Tehreek-e-Insaf	Muhammad Zahir Shah	13 August 2018
PK-53 (Mardan-VI)	Mardan	Pakistan Tehreek-e-Insaf	Muhammad Abdul Salam	23 October 2018
PK-54 (Mardan-VII)	Mardan	Pakistan Tehreek-e-Insaf	Iftikhar Ali Mushwani	13 August 2018
PK-55 (Mardan-VIII)	Mardan	Pakistan Muslim League (N)	Jamshid Khan	13 August 2018
PK-56 (Charsadda-I)	Charsadda	Pakistan Tehreek-e-Insaf	Khalid Khan	13 August 2018
PK-57 (Charsadda-II)	Charsadda	Awami National Party	Shakeel Bashir Khan	13 August 2018
PK-58 (Charsadda-III)	Charsadda	Pakistan Tehreek-e-Insaf	Sultan Mohammad Khan	13 August 2018
PK-59 (Charsadda-IV)	Charsadda	Pakistan Tehreek-e-Insaf	Fazle Shakoor Khan	13 August 2018
PK-60 (Charsadda-V)	Charsadda	Pakistan Tehreek-e-Insaf	Mohammad Arif	13 August 2018
PK-61 (Nowshera-I)	Nowshera	Pakistan Tehreek-e-Insaf	Muhammad Ibrahim Khan Khattak	14 October 2018
PK-62 (Nowshera-II)	Nowshera	Pakistan Tehreek-e-Insaf	Muhammad Idrees	13 August 2018
PK-63 (Nowshera-III)	Nowshera	Pakistan Muslim League (N)	Ikhtiar Wali Khan	2 March 2021
PK-64 (Nowshera-IV)	Nowshera	Pakistan Tehreek-e-Insaf	Liaquat Khan Khattak	14 October 2018
PK-65 (Nowshera-V)	Nowshera	Pakistan Tehreek-e-Insaf	Khaliq-ur-Rehman	13 August 2018
PK-66 (Peshawar-I)	Peshawar	Pakistan Tehreek-e-Insaf	Mehmood Jan	13 August 2018
PK-67 (Peshawar-II)	Peshawar	Pakistan Tehreek-e-Insaf	Arbab Muhammad Wasim Khan	13 August 2018
PK-68 (Peshawar-III)	Peshawar	Pakistan Tehreek-e-Insaf	Arbab Jahandad Khan	13 August 2018
PK-69 (Peshawar-IV)	Peshawar	Pakistan Tehreek-e-Insaf	Syed Muhammad Ishtiaq	13 August 2018
PK-70 (Peshawar-V)	Peshawar	Awami National Party	Khush Dil Khan	13 August 2018
PK-71 (Peshawar-VI)	Peshawar	Awami National Party	Salahuddin Khan	29 October 2018
PK-72 (Peshawar-VII)	Peshawar	Pakistan Tehreek-e-Insaf	Fahim Ahmad	13 August 2018
PK-73 (Peshawar-VIII)	Peshawar	Pakistan Tehreek-e-Insaf	Taimur Saleem Khan Jhagra	13 August 2018
PK-74 (Peshawar-IX)	Peshawar	Pakistan Tehreek-e-Insaf	Pir Fida Muhammad	13 August 2018
PK-75 (Peshawar-X)	Peshawar	Pakistan Tehreek-e-Insaf	Wajid Ullah Khan	13 August 2018
PK-76 (Peshawar-XI)	Peshawar	Pakistan Tehreek-e-Insaf	Asif Khan	13 August 2018
PK-77 (Peshawar-XII)	Peshawar	Pakistan Tehreek-e-Insaf	Kamran Khan Bangash	13 August 2018
PK-78 (Peshawar-XIII)	Peshawar	Awami National Party	Samar Haroon Bilour	24 October 2018
PK-79 (Peshawar-XIV)	Peshawar	Pakistan Tehreek-e-Insaf	Fazal Elahi	13 August 2018
PK-80 (Kohat-I)	Kohat	Pakistan Peoples Party	Amjad Khan Afridi	13 August 2018
PK-81 (Kohat-II)	Kohat	Muttahida Majlis-e-Amal	Shah Dad Khan	13 August 2018
PK-82 (Kohat-III)	Kohat	Pakistan Tehreek-e-Insaf	Zia Ullah Khan Bangash	13 August 2018
PK-83 (Hangu-I)	Hangu	Pakistan Tehreek-e-Insaf	Shah Faisal Khan	13 August 2018
PK-84 (Hangu-II)	Hangu	Pakistan Tehreek-e-Insaf	Muhammad Zahoor	13 August 2018
PK-85 (Karak-I)	Karak	Muttahida Majlis-e-Amal	Mian Nisar Gul	13 August 2018
PK-86 (Karak-II)	Karak	Muttahida Majlis-e-Amal	Zafar Azam	13 August 2018
PK-87 (Bannu-I)	Bannu	Pakistan Peoples Party	Sher Azam Khan	13 August 2018
PK-88 (Bannu-II)	Bannu	Pakistan Tehreek-e-Insaf	Pakhtoon Yar Khan	13 August 2018
PK-89 (Bannu-III)	Bannu	Pakistan Tehreek-e-Insaf	Shah Muhammad Khan	13 August 2018
PK-90 (Bannu-IV)	Bannu	Muttahida Majlis-e-Amal	Akram Khan Durrani	13 August 2018
PK-91 (Lakki Marwat-I)	Lakki Marwat	Muttahida Majlis-e-Amal	Munawar Khan Advocate	13 August 2018
PK-92 (Lakki Marwat-II)	Lakki Marwat	Pakistan Tehreek-e-Insaf	Hisham Inamullah Khan	13 August 2018
PK-93 (Lakki Marwat-III)	Lakki Marwat	Muttahida Majlis-e-Amal	Anwar Hayat Khan	13 August 2018
PK-94 (Tank)	Tank	Muttahida Majlis-e-Amal	Mahmood Ahmad Khan	13 August 2018
PK-95 (Dera Ismail Khan-I)	Dera Ismail Khan	Pakistan Tehreek-e-Insaf	Ehtesham Javed Akber Khan	13 August 2018
PK-96 (Dera Ismail Khan-II)	Dera Ismail Khan	Pakistan Peoples Party	Ahmad Kundi	13 August 2018
PK-97 (Dera Ismail Khan-III)	Dera Ismail Khan	Pakistan Tehreek-e-Insaf	Faisal Amin Khan Gandapur	22 October 2018
PK-98 (Dera Ismail Khan-IV)	Dera Ismail Khan	Muttahida Majlis-e-Amal	Maulana Lutf ur Rehman	13 August 2018
PK-99 (Dera Ismail Khan-V)	Dera Ismail Khan	Pakistan Tehreek-e-Insaf	Aghaz Ikramullah Gandapur	22 October 2018
PK-100 (Bajaur-I)	Bajaur	Pakistan Tehreek-e-Insaf	Anwar Zeb Khan	27 August 2019
PK-101 (Bajaur-II)	Bajaur	Pakistan Tehreek-e-Insaf	Ajmal Khan	27 August 2019
PK-102 (Bajaur-III)	Bajaur	Jamaat-e-Islami Pakistan	Sirajuddin Khan	27 August 2019
PK-103 (Mohmand-I)	Mohmand	Awami National Party	Nisar Mohmand	27 August 2019
PK-104 (Mohmand-II)	Mohmand	Balochistan Awami Party	Malik Abbas Rehman	27 August 2019
PK-105 (Khyber-I)	Khyber	Balochistan Awami Party	Shafiq Sher Afridi	27 August 2019
PK-106 (Khyber-II)	Khyber	Balochistan Awami Party	Bilawal Afridi	27 August 2019
PK-107 (Khyber-III)	Khyber	Pakistan Tehreek-e-Insaf	Muhammad Shafiq Afridi	27 August 2019
PK-108 (Kurram-I)	Kurram	Jamiat Ulema-e-Islam (F)	Muhammad Riaz Shaheen	27 August 2019
PK-109 (Kurram-II)	Kurram	Pakistan Tehreek-e-Insaf	Iqbal Mian	27 August 2019
PK-110 (Orakzai)	Orakzai	Pakistan Tehreek-e-Insaf	Syed Ghazi Ghazan Jamal Orakzai	27 August 2019
PK-111 (North Waziristan-I)	North Waziristan	Pakistan Tehreek-e-Insaf	Muhammad Iqbal Wazir	27 August 2019
PK-112 (North Waziristan-II)	North Waziristan	Independent	Mir Kalam Wazir	27 August 2019
PK-113 (South Waziristan-I)	South Waziristan	Jamiat Ulema-e-Islam (F)	Hafiz Assamuddin	27 August 2019
PK-114 (South Waziristan-II)	South Waziristan	Pakistan Tehreek-e-Insaf	Naseerullah Wazir	27 August 2019
PK-115 (Ex-Frontier regions)	Frontier Regions	Jamiat Ulema-e-Islam (F)	Muhammad Shoaib Khan Afridi	27 August 2019
Reserved seat for women	Reserved seat for women	Pakistan Tehreek-e-Insaf	Nadia Sher	13 August 2018
Reserved seat for women	Reserved seat for women	Pakistan Tehreek-e-Insaf	Maliha Ali Asghar Khan	13 August 2018
Reserved seat for women	Reserved seat for women	Pakistan Tehreek-e-Insaf	Aisha Naeem	13 August 2018
Reserved seat for women	Reserved seat for women	Pakistan Tehreek-e-Insaf	Momina Basit	13 August 2018
Reserved seat for women	Reserved seat for women	Pakistan Tehreek-e-Insaf	Sumera Shams	13 August 2018
Reserved seat for women	Reserved seat for women	Pakistan Tehreek-e-Insaf	Rabia Basri	13 August 2018
Reserved seat for women	Reserved seat for women	Pakistan Tehreek-e-Insaf	Asiya Asad	13 August 2018
Reserved seat for women	Reserved seat for women	Pakistan Tehreek-e-Insaf	Sajida Haneef	13 August 2018
Reserved seat for women	Reserved seat for women	Pakistan Tehreek-e-Insaf	Somi Falak Naz	13 August 2018
Reserved seat for women	Reserved seat for women	Pakistan Tehreek-e-Insaf	Aisha Bano	13 August 2018
Reserved seat for women	Reserved seat for women	Pakistan Tehreek-e-Insaf	Sitara Afreen	13 August 2018
Reserved seat for women	Reserved seat for women	Pakistan Tehreek-e-Insaf	Zeenat Bibi	13 August 2018
Reserved seat for women	Reserved seat for women	Pakistan Tehreek-e-Insaf	Asia Khattak	13 August 2018
Reserved seat for women	Reserved seat for women	Pakistan Tehreek-e-Insaf	Maria Fatima	13 August 2018
Reserved seat for women	Reserved seat for women	Pakistan Tehreek-e-Insaf	Sumaiyah Bibi	15 October 2018
Reserved seat for women	Reserved seat for women	Pakistan Tehreek-e-Insaf	Madiha Nisar	15 October 2018
Reserved seat for women	Reserved seat for women	Pakistan Tehreek-e-Insaf	Aysha Bibi	13 November 2019
Reserved seat for women	Reserved seat for women	Pakistan Tehreek-e-Insaf	Anita Mehsud	27 August 2019
Reserved seat for women	Reserved seat for women	Muttahida Majlis-e-Amal	Rehana Ismail	13 August 2018
Reserved seat for women	Reserved seat for women	Muttahida Majlis-e-Amal	Humaira Khatoon	13 August 2018
Reserved seat for women	Reserved seat for women	Muttahida Majlis-e-Amal	Naeema Kishwar	27 August 2019
Reserved seat for women	Reserved seat for women	Awami National Party	Shagufta Malik	13 August 2018
Reserved seat for women	Reserved seat for women	Awami National Party	Shahida Waheed	13 August 2018
Reserved seat for women	Reserved seat for women	Pakistan Muslim League (N)	Sobia Shahid	13 August 2018
Reserved seat for women	Reserved seat for women	Pakistan Peoples Party	Nighat Orakzai	13 August 2018
Reserved seat for women	Reserved seat for women	Balochistan Awami Party	Baserat Khan	13 November 2019
Reserved seat for Non Muslims	Reserved seat for Non Muslims	Pakistan Tehreek-e-Insaf	Ravi Kumar	13 August 2018
Reserved seat for Non Muslims	Reserved seat for Non Muslims	Pakistan Tehreek-e-Insaf	Wazir Zada	13 August 2018
Reserved seat for Non Muslims	Reserved seat for Non Muslims	Pakistan Tehreek-e-Insaf	Wilson Wazir	27 August 2019
Reserved seat for Non Muslims	Reserved seat for Non Muslims	Muttahida Majlis-e-Amal	Ranjeet Singh	13 August 2018
