= 2021 Karachi grenade attack =

Grenade attack in Karachi, Pakistan

2021 Karachi massacre
- Date: 14 August 2021
- Time: 9:30 pm (UTC+05:00)
- Location: Karachi, Pakistan
- Target: Family of Swat District, Khyber Pakhtunkhwa
- Deaths: 14
- Injuries: 10 - 15

On 14 August 2021, at 9:30 pm 14 people, were killed and several others injured in a grenade attack on Independence Day at night in Karachi. All the victims belonged to a family in Khwazakhela, Swat District.

== Background ==
A family of 20 members was on their way to a wedding in a mini-truck when an unidentified man attacked with a grenade. Ambulances of various welfare organizations shifted the injured to the Civil Hospital. Law enforcement agencies (LEAs), including police and Rangers, cordoned off the scene to gather evidence. Initially, the LEAs claimed the incident as a cylinder explosion. Hours later, police confirmed based on the initial report of the Bomb Disposal Squad, that it was a terrorist attack. The BDS report the device a Russian manufactured grenade - RGD-1.

== Protest ==
On 17 August a rally protested in Khwazakhela Bazaar of Swat District, chanted slogans and demand the Sindh Police to immediate arrest of the accused.

== Investigation ==
Interior Minister Shaikh Rasheed Ahmad, Chief Minister Sindh Murad Ali Shah and Murtaza Wahab expressed deep sorrow over the tragic incident. And they demanded a detailed report from DG Rangers, IGP Sindh and deputy commissioner Keamari District.

Khyber Pakhtunkhwa Chief Minister Mahmood Khan telephoned Sindh Chief Minister Murad Ali Shah and demand for action to arrest and punish the accused.

The Khyber Pakhtunkhwa Assembly, while protesting and condemning the attack, has decided to take up the matter with the Sindh government through the inter-provincial liaison department and send an assembly delegation to Karachi.

== Reactions ==
Khyber Pakhtunkhwa Assembly;

On 23 August, Awami National Party member of the assembly Waqar Ahmad Khan demanded that the affected family be given a martyr's package, the ministers go to the family and console them. PML-N's Sardar Khan said that it was a great injustice. PPP's Nighat Orakzai said that Sindh Chief Minister also took notice and compensation was also given to the dead and injured. PTI's Fazal Hakim said that Chief Minister Mahmood Khan had spoken to Sindh Chief Minister but a letter should also be written to the Sindh government on behalf of the Assembly. Provincial Minister Amjad Ali said that the family of Swat was unjustly killed and the Sindh government would be contacted by the provincial liaison affairs.
