= Izazul Mulk =

Pakistani politician

Izazul Mulk MPA

Member of the Khyber Pakhtunkhwa Assembly
- In office 21 March 2016 – 28 May 2018
- Constituency: PK-95 (Lower Dir-II)

Personal details
- Born: 28 June 1967 (age 58) Lower Dir District
- Party: Jamaat-e-Islami Pakistan (JI)
- Occupation: Politician

Izazul Mulk (born; 28 June 1967) is a Pakistani politician from Lower Dir District, belonging to Jamaat-e-Islami Pakistan, who served as a member of the Khyber Pakhtunkhwa Assembly. He also served as a member of various committees.

== Political career ==
Izazul Mulk was elected as the member of the Khyber Pakhtunkhwa Assembly on ticket of Jamaat-e-Islami Pakistan from PK-95 (Lower Dir-II) in by-polls election held in May 2015, after the seat became vacant in March 2015 when the party's leader, Siraj ul Haq, was elected as senator. He received 20,288 votes and defeated Bahadar Khan, a candidate of the Awami National Party (ANP).

He ran for a seat of the Provincial Assembly of Khyber Pakhtunkhwa as a candidate of JI from PK-16 Lower Dir-IV in the 2018 Khyber Pakhtunkhwa provincial election, but was unsuccessful. He received 16,301 votes and was defeated by Bahadar Khan, a candidate of the ANP.
