= Maria Fatima (given name) =

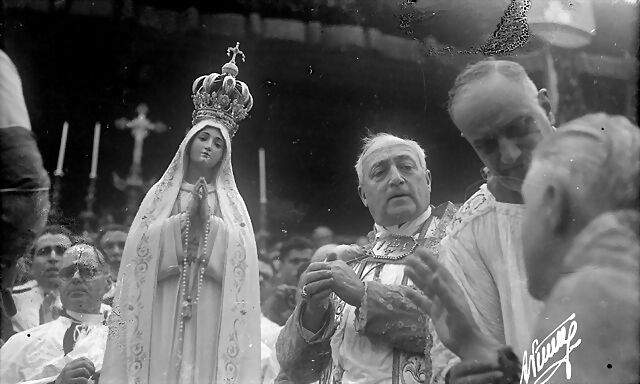
- Coronation of the Statue of Our Lady of Fatima on May 13, 1946 by Cardinal Benedetto Aloisi Masella.
- Gender: Female
- Language: English

Origin
- Meaning: Combination of Maria and Fatima, given in reference to Our Lady of Fatima.

Maria Fatima or María Fátima or Maria de Fatima is a feminine given name, a combination of the names Maria and Fatima. The combination name is sometimes given in reference to Our Lady of Fátima, a Roman Catholic title of Mary based on the 1917 Marian apparitions reported by three shepherd children in Fátima, Portugal. The name is most predominant among Portuguese and Spanish speakers.

The name might refer to:

- Maria Fatima, Pakistani politician
- María de Fátima Acosta (born 1992), Peruvian volleyball player
- María Fátima Báñez García (born 1967), Spanish politician
- María Fátima Blázquez Lozano (born 1975), Spanish road cyclist and 1996 Summer Olympian
- Maria Fatima Deguara (born 1949), Maltese politician
