= PK-82 Peshawar-XIV =

Pakistani political constituency

- Former constituency for the Khyber Pakhtunkhwa Assembly
- Region: Peshtakhara and Chamkani Tehsils (partly) and Peshawar City areas of Peshawar District

Former constituency
- Created: 2018
- Abolished: 2023
- Created from: PK-03 Peshawar-III, PK-04 Peshawar-IV and PK-06 Peshawar-VI

PK-82 Peshawar-XIV (پی کے-82 پشاور-14) was a constituency for the Khyber Pakhtunkhwa Assembly of the Khyber Pakhtunkhwa province of Pakistan.

== Members of Assembly ==
=== 2018-2022 PK-79 Peshawar-XIV ===
Election	Member	Party
2018	Fazal Elahi	PTI

== Elections 2018 ==
Fazal Elahi of Pakistan Tehreek-e-Insaf won the seat by getting 18,065 votes.

Provincial election 2018: PK-79 Peshawar-XIV
Party	Candidate	Votes	%
PTI	Fazal Elahi	18,065	39.88
MMA	Malik Naushad Khan	5,776	12.75
PPP	Umar Khitab	5,690	12.56
ANP	Abdul Jabbar	5,658	12.49
PML(N)	Raees Khan	3,967	8.76
TLP	Hujjat Ullah	3,697	8.16
QWP	Ghulam Haider Khan	1,571	3.47
APML	Wakeel Khan	208	0.46
Independent	4 Independents and TJP	663	1.47
Turnout		47,010	41.46
Valid ballots		45,295	96.35
Rejected ballots		1,715	3.65
Majority		12,289	27.13
Registered electors		1,13,386	
PTI win (new seat)			

== See also ==
- PK-81 Peshawar-XIII
- PK-83 Nowshera-I
