= Anwar Khan =

Anwar Khan is the name of:

- Anwar Khan (cricketer) (born 1955), Pakistani former cricketer
- Anwar Khan (Guantanamo detainee 948), Afghan, former Guantanamo detainee
- Anwar Ahmed Khan (born 1933), Pakistani field hockey player
- Anwar Ahmed Khan (cricketer) (born 1986), Indian cricketer
- Anwar Hayat Khan, Pakistani politician
- Anwar Kamal Khan (1946–2012), Pakistani politician
- Anwar Saifullah Khan (born 1946), Pakistan politician
- Anwar Khan, a fictional character portrayed by Mukesh Tiwari in the 2005 Indian film Apaharan
