= Himayat Ullah Mayar =

Pakistani politician

Mayor of Mardan
- In office 16 March 2022 – 16 March 2026

Member of the National Assembly of Pakistan
- In office 2012–2013
- Constituency: NA-9 (Mardan-I)

Personal details
- Born: =4 April 1968 (age 58)

Himayat Ullah Mayar (Urdu: حمایت اللہ مایار) is a Pakistani politician who is currently serving as Mayor of Mardan since March 2022. He had also served as a member of the National Assembly of Pakistan from 2008 to 2013.

== Political career ==
He served as former nazim of Mardan district.

He ran for the seat of the Khyber Pakhtunkhwa Assembly as a candidate of Awami National Party (ANP) from Constituency PK-25 (Mardan-III) in the 2002 Pakistani general election but was unsuccessful. He received 5,483 votes and lost the seat to Israr-ul-Haq, a candidate of Muttahida Majlis-e-Amal (MMA).

He was elected to the National Assembly of Pakistan from Constituency NA-9 (Mardan-I) as a candidate of ANP in by-polls held in 2012. He received 30,770 votes and defeated Maulana Shuja Ul Mulk, a candidate of Jamiat Ulema-e Islam (F) (JUI-F).

In August 2015, he was elected district nazim of Mardan.
