= Fateh-ul-Mulk Ali Nasir =

Pakistani politician and ceremonial Mehtar of Chitral

His Highness Mehtar Fateh-ul-Mulk Ali Nasir
- فاتح الملک علی ناصر
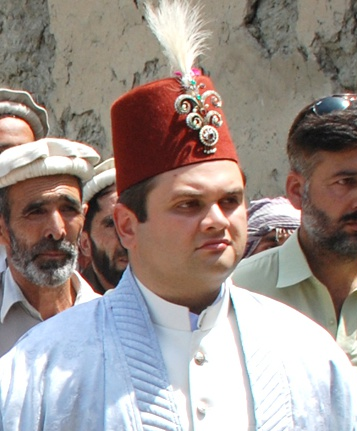
- Mehtar Fateh-ul-Mulk Ali Nasir in 2012

Member of the Provincial Assembly of Khyber Pakhtunkhwa
- Incumbent
- Assumed office 29 February 2024
- Constituency: PK-2 Lower Chitral

Mehtar of Chitral
- Incumbent
- Assumed office 20 October 2011
- Preceded by: Saif-ul-Mulk Nasir

Personal details
- Born: 27 November 1983 (age 42)
- Party: PTI (2022-present)
- Education: University of Buckingham University of Miami

Fateh-ul-Mulk Ali Nasir (Urdu: فاتح الملک علی ناصر; born 27 November 1983) is a Pakistani politician and the current head of the Royal House of Katur and ceremonial Mehtar of Chitral.

== Early life, education and family background ==
Fateh-ul-Mulk Ali Nasir was born on 27 November 1983 to H. H. Mehtar Saif-ul-Mulk Nasir, the last ruling Mehtar of Chitral and Ismat Khonza, daughter of Nawab Saeed Khan of Amb State. He was installed as the Mehtar of the former Chitral State at Chitral Fort following the death of his father in 2011. He started his education in Hong Kong, where his father was the Counsel General of Pakistan and went on to continue his schooling at the International School of Islamabad. He received his LL.B Hons. from the University of Buckingham and an LLM from the University of Miami. Following his education he was enrolled as an Advocate of the High Court by the Khyber Pakhtunkhwa Bar Council. He completed a Certificate in International Environmental Law from UNITAR.

He is married to Rahemeen Ayub Khan, daughter of Akbar Ayub Khan and great-granddaughter of President Muhammad Ayub Khan.

== Writing ==
Fateh-ul-Mulk is a writer and has written many articles about travel, history, archaeology, fishing, geopolitics and Chitral. He mostly writes for The Friday Times.

== Political career ==
He joined Pakistan Tehreek-e-Insaf (PTI) in 2022. In the 2024 Khyber Pakhtunkhwa provincial election, he participated as an independent candidate from PK-2 Lower Chitral and won by securing 28,510 votes.

In July 2024 he was appointed as the District Development Advisory Committee (DDAC) Chairman Lower Chitral by the Chief Minister of Khyber Pakhtunkhwa.

In September 2024 he was selected to be the Chairman of the Standing Committee on Revenue & Estate of the Khyber Pakhtunkhwa Assembly.

Chief Minister Sohail Afridi appointed him to be Parliamentary Secretary for Culture, Tourism, Archaeology and Museums in July 2026. Now he is formally part of the provincial government (executive).

== Bibliography ==
Asiatic Angling Adventures is a book Fateh-ul-Mulk wrote about his fishing expeditions across seven countries catching gamefish such as barramundi, giant snakehead, mahseer and sailfish. In it he also talks about the history, culture and geography of the countries visited.

Nasir, Fateh-ul-Mulk Ali (2018). Asiatic Angling Adventures. Le Topical. ISBN 978-969-712-003-1
