= Ehtesham Javed Akber Khan =

Pakistani politician

Member of the Provincial Assembly of Khyber Pakhtunkhwa
- In office 13 August 2018 – 18 January 2023
- Preceded by: Himself
- Constituency: PK-95 (Dera Ismail Khan-I)
- In office 8 September 2014 – 28 May 2018
- Preceded by: Javed Akbar Khan
- Succeeded by: Himself
- Constituency: PK-68 (D.I. Khan-V)

Personal details
- Party: PTI-P (2023-present)
- Other political affiliations: PTI (2014-2018; 2022-2023); Independent (2018-2022)
- Occupation: Politician

Ehtesham Javed Akber Khan is a Pakistani politician, who had been a member of the Khyber Pakhtunkhwa Assembly from September 2014 to May 2018 and from August 2018 to January 2023, belonging to the Pakistan Tehreek-e-Insaf.

== Political career ==
Khan was elected as the member of the Khyber Pakhtunkhwa Assembly as a candidate of Pakistan Tehreek-e-Insaf (PTI) from PK-68 (D.I. Khan-V) in a by-election held in September 2014 due to the disqualification of Javed Akbar Khan, his father, over a fake degree case.

He was re-elected as a member of the Provincial Assembly of Khyber Pakhtunkhwa from PK-95 (Dera Ismail Khan-I) as an independent candidate in the 2018 elections.

He rejoined PTI on 29 October 2022.
