= Liaqat Ali Khan (Khyber Pakhtunkhwa politician) =

Pakistani politician

Member of the Provincial Assembly of Khyber Pakhtunkhwa
- Incumbent
- Assumed office 29 February 2024
- Constituency: PK-18 (Lower Dir-V)
- In office 13 August 2018 – 18 January 2023
- Constituency: PK-17 (Lower Dir-V)

Personal details
- Party: PTI (2018-present)

Liaqat Ali Khan is a Pakistani politician who had been a member of the Provincial Assembly of Khyber Pakhtunkhwa from August 2018 till January 2023.

== Political career ==
He was elected to the Provincial Assembly of Khyber Pakhtunkhwa as a candidate of Pakistan Tehreek-e-Insaf (PTI) from PK-17 Lower Dir-V in the 2018 Pakistani general election. He received 22,886 votes and defeated Saeed Gul, a candidate of Muttahida Majlis-e-Amal (MMA).
