= Syed Muhammad Ali Shah Bacha =

Pakistani politician

Syed Muhammad Ali Shah (Bacha)

Member of the Provincial Assembly of Khyber Pakhtunkhwa
- In office 2002 – 28 May 2018
- Constituency: PK-98 (Malakand Protected Area-I)

Personal details
- Party: PPP (1987- present)

Syed Muhammad Ali Shah (Bacha) is a member of Pakistan People's Party since 1987. Currently he is serving as the Provincial President PPP Khyber Pukhtunkhwa. He remained a Member of the Provincial Assembly of Khyber Pakhtunkhwa, from 2002 to May 2018, three consecutive terms. Held the office of Minister Of State for Water Resources for a year (2022-2023).

== Political career ==
He was elected to the Provincial Assembly of the North-West Frontier Province as a candidate of Pakistan Peoples Party (PPP) from Constituency PF-98 (Malakand Protected Area-I) in 2002 Pakistani general election. He received 9,926 votes and defeated a candidate of Muttahida Majlis-e-Amal.

He was re-elected to the Provincial Assembly of the North-West Frontier Province as a candidate of PPP from Constituency PF-98 (Malakand Protected Area-I) in 2008 Pakistani general election. He received 17,654 votes and defeated a candidate of Awami National Party.

He was re-elected to the Provincial Assembly of Khyber Pakhtunkhwa as a candidate of PPP from Constituency PK-98 (Malakand Protected Area-I) in 2013 Pakistani general election. He received 16,150 votes and defeated a candidate of Pakistan Tehreek-e-Insaf.

In a released video by the Pakistan Tehreek Insaf, multiple members of the parliament, were allegedly seen “horse trading” in Senate Election 2018. While clarifying his presence in one of the many videos where he was sitting across the table, he said that the video was recorded in Asad Qaiser’s home, further he said that as a parliamentary leader of PPP it was his duty to go and ask for vote from any party. Pakistan Tehreek Insaf never held any inquiry on the alleged video. The video surfaced on 9th Feb, 2021 by the government just before a month of new senate elections. Although it put some skepticism on the fairness of Elections, further proof was never released nor was any action taken, which led citizens to question the validity of the video and the hands behind the release of it.
