= Azam Khan Durrani =

Pakistani politician

MPA Azam Khan Durrani

Member of the Khyber Pakhtunkhwa Assembly
- Incumbent
- Assumed office 31 May 2013
- Constituency: PK-70 (Bannu-I)

Personal details
- Born: 1968 (age 57–58) Bannu
- Party: Jamiat Ulema-e-Islam (F)
- Occupation: Politician

Azam Khan Durrani (Pashto: اعظم خان دراني) is a Pakistani politician, who is currently a member of the Khyber Pakhtunkhwa Assembly, belonging to the Jamiat Ulema-e-Islam (F). He was also elected as District Nazim bannu from 2005 to 2010. He is also serving as member of different committees in Khyber Pakhtunkhwa Assembly. He is the grandson of Khalifa Gul Nawaz, who was a military commander with Haji Mirzali Khan and fought many battles against British Empire.

== Political career ==
Ali was elected as the member of the Khyber Pakhtunkhwa Assembly on ticket of Jamiat Ulema-e-Islam (F) from PK-70 (Bannu-I) in the 2013 Pakistani general election.
