= Muhammad Deedar =

Pakistani politician

Muhammad Dedar

Member of the Provincial Assembly of Khyber Pakhtunkhwa
- In office 13 August 2018 – 18 January 2023
- Constituency: PK-25 (Kohistan)

Personal details
- Party: PTI-P (2023-present)
- Other political affiliations: PTI (2018-2023)

Muhammad Dedar is a Pakistani politician who had been a member of the Provincial Assembly of Khyber Pakhtunkhwa from August 2018 till January 2023.

== Political career ==
He was elected to the Provincial Assembly of Khyber Pakhtunkhwa as an independent candidate from Constituency PK-25 (Kohistan) in the 2018 Pakistani general election.
