= Hidayat Ullah Khan =

Pakistani politician

Member of the Senate of Pakistan
- Incumbent
- Assumed office March 2021
- Constituency: Khyber Pakhtunkhwa

Provincial Minister for Livestock and Dairy Development
- In office 2008–2013

Personal details
- Born: 1 January 1956 (age 70)
- Party: ANP (2008-present)

Hidayat Ullah Khan (Pashto: ہدایت اللہ خان) (born 1 January 1956) is a Pakistani politician who is currently serving as a member of the Senate of Pakistan from the Khyber Pakhtunkhwa since March 2021. He belongs to Awami National Party. He also served as a member of the Khyber Pakhtunkhwa Assembly and Provincial Minister for Livestock and Dairy Development from 2008 to 2013.
