= Saeed Gul =

Pakistani politician

Member of the Provincial Assembly of Khyber Pakhtunkhwa
- In office 29 May 2013 – 29 May 2018
- Constituency: Constituency PK-96 (Lower Dir-III)

Personal details
- Party: JIP (2025-present)
- Other political affiliations: JIP (2013-2025)

Saeed Gul is a Pakistani politician who had been a Member of the Provincial Assembly of Khyber Pakhtunkhwa, from May 2013 to May 2018. Previously he had been a member of the Provincial Assembly of the Provincial Assembly of Khyber Pakhtunkhwa from 2002 to 2007.

== Education ==
He has a Master of Arts degree.

== Political career ==
He was elected to the Provincial Assembly of the North-West Frontier Province as a candidate of Muttahida Majlis-e-Amal from Constituency PF-96 (Lower Dir-III) in the 2002 Pakistani general election. He received 10,326 votes and defeated a candidate of Pakistan Peoples Party (PPP).

He was re-elected to the Provincial Assembly of Khyber Pakhtunkhwa as a candidate of Jamaat-e-Islami Pakistan from Constituency PK-96 (Lower Dir-III) in the 2013 Pakistani general election. He received 14,193 votes and defeated a candidate of PPP.
