= Gohar Nawaz Khan =

Pakistani politician

Member of the Khyber Pakhtunkhwa Assembly
- In office 31 May 2013 – 28 May 2018
- Constituency: PK-51 (Haripur-III)

Personal details
- Party: QWP
- Occupation: Politician

Gohar Nawaz Khan (Urdu: گوہر نواز خان) is a Pakistani politician hailing from Haripur District. He is an advisor of Metrix Tech Summit Pakistan's biggest tech Summit. He had served as a member of the Khyber Pakhtunkhwa Assembly belonging to the Qaumi Watan Party. He had also served as member of several different committees.

== Political career ==
Gohar was elected a member of the Khyber Pakhtunkhwa Assembly, an Independent from PK-51 (Haripur-III) in the 2013 Pakistani general election and later joined the Qaumi Watan Party.
