= Sumera Shams =

Pakistani politician

Dr Sumera Shams MPA

Member of the Provincial Assembly of Khyber Pakhtunkhwa
- In office 13 August 2018 – 18 January 2023

Personal details
- Born: August 19, 1991 (age 34)
- Party: PTI (2018-present)
- Occupation: MBBS doctor, politician

Sumera Shams is a Pakistani politician who had been a member of the Khyber Pakhtunkhwa Assembly from August 2018 till January 2023.

== Early life ==
Her younger sister Noorena Shams has represented Pakistan in international squash.

== Political career ==
Shams was elected as the member of the Khyber Pakhtunkhwa Assembly on a ticket of Pakistan Tehreek-e-Insaf from Lower Dir District in the provincial election held in July 2018.

She is the youngest person to be elected as a Member of the Provincial Assembly. She was also one of the first women to cast a vote in Lower Dir.

Previously she served as a district councillor in Lower Dir in 2015.

Shams was named a 2022 Politician of the Year by One Young World, receiving her award in Manchester, England, in September 2022 alongside four other young politicians from around the world.
