= Shah Hussain Khan =

Pakistani politician

Member of the Provincial Assembly of Khyber Pakhtunkhwa
- In office 2002 – 28 May 2018
- Constituency: Constituency PK-60 (Batagram-II)

Personal details
- Party: JUI (F)

Shah Hussain Khan is a Pakistani politician who had been a Member of the Provincial Assembly of Khyber Pakhtunkhwa, from 2002 to May 2018.

== Political career ==
He was elected to the Provincial Assembly of the North-West Frontier Province as a candidate of Muttahida Majlis-e-Amal (MMA) from Constituency PF-60 (Batagram-II) in the 2002 Pakistani general election. He received 7,176 votes and defeated a candidate of Pakistan Muslim League (Q) (PML-Q) zubair khan.

He was re-elected to the Provincial Assembly of the North-West Frontier Province as a candidate of MMA from Constituency PF-60 (Batagram-II) in the 2008 Pakistani general election. He received 10,298 votes and defeated a candidate of PML-Q zubair khan.

He was re-elected to the Provincial Assembly of Khyber Pakhtunkhwa as a candidate of Jamiat Ulema-e Islam (F) from Constituency PK-60 (Batagram-II) in the 2013 Pakistani general election. He received 8,382 votes and defeated an independent candidate, Zubir Khan.
