= PK-18 Lower Dir-V =

Pakistani electoral district

- Constituency for the Khyber Pakhtunkhwa Assembly
- Region: Samar Bagh Tehsil (partly) and Lal Qilla Tehsil of Lower Dir District

Current constituency
- Created: 2018
- Party: Pakistan Tehreek-e-Insaf
- Member(s): Liaqat Ali Khan
- Created from: PK-95 Lower Dir-II and PK-96 Lower Dir-III (2002-2018); PK-17 Lower Dir-V (2018-2023)

PK-18 Lower Dir-V (پی کے-18 دیر زیریں-5) is a constituency for the Khyber Pakhtunkhwa Assembly of the Khyber Pakhtunkhwa province of Pakistan.

== See also ==
- PK-16 Lower Dir-IV
- PK-19 Bajaur-I
