= PK-26 Buner-II =

Pakistani electoral district

- Constituency for the Khyber Pakhtunkhwa Assembly
- Region: Daggar Tehsil (partly), Gagra and Chagharzai Tehsils of Buner District

Current constituency
- Party: Pakistan Tehreek-e-Insaf
- Member(s): Syed Fakhr e Jehan
- Created from: PK-78 Bunair-II (2002-2018); PK-21 Buner-II (2018-2023)

PK-26 Buner-II (پی کے-26 بونیر-2) is a constituency for the Khyber Pakhtunkhwa Assembly of the Khyber Pakhtunkhwa province of Pakistan.

== See also ==
- PK-25 Buner-I
- PK-27 Buner-III
