= PK-113 Dera Ismail Khan-III =

Pakistani electoral district

- Constituency for the Khyber Pakhtunkhwa Assembly
- Region: Dera Ismail Khan city and cantonment area of Dera Ismail Khan District

Current constituency
- Created from: PK-64 Dera Ismail Khan-I (2002-2018); PK-97 Dera Ismail Khan-III (2018-2023)

PK-113 Dera Ismail Khan-III (پی کے-113، ڈیرہ اسماعیل خان-3) is a constituency for the Khyber Pakhtunkhwa Assembly of the Khyber Pakhtunkhwa province of Pakistan.

== See also ==
- PK-112 Dera Ismail Khan-II
- PK-114 Dera Ismail Khan-IV
