= Wazir Zada =

Pakistani social activist and politician

Member of the Provincial Assembly of Khyber Pakhtunkhwa
- In office 13 August 2018 – 18 January 2023
- Constituency: Reserved seat for minorities

Personal details
- Party: PTI (2009-present)

Wazir Zada (born c. 1984) is a Pakistani social activist and politician who was a member of the Provincial Assembly of Khyber Pakhtunkhwa. He is the first Kalasha to become the member of Provincial Assembly of Khyber Pakhtunkhwa.

== Early life and education ==
He was born in Chitral. He completed his matriculation and college from Chitral. Later he received his master's degree in Political Science from the University of Peshawar.

He is a social activist for rights of Kalash people.

== Political career ==
He joined Pakistan Tehreek-e-Insaf (PTI) in 2009.

He was elected to the Provincial Assembly of Khyber Pakhtunkhwa as a candidate of PTI on a reserved seat for minorities in the 2018 Pakistani general election, where he stands as having no religion.
