= Ravi Kumar (Pakistani politician) =

Pakistani politician

Member of the Provincial Assembly of Khyber Pakhtunkhwa
- In office 13 August 2018 – 18 January 2023
- Constituency: Reserved seat for minorities

Personal details
- Party: PTI (2018-present)

Ravi Kumar (Urdu: روی کمار) is a Pakistani politician who was elected member for the Provincial Assembly of Khyber Pakhtunkhwa.

== Political career ==
He was elected to Provincial Assembly of Khyber Pakhtunkhwa on a reserved seat for minorities in the 2018 Pakistani general election representing Pakistan Tehreek-e-Insaf.
