= PK-24 Malakand-II =

Pakistani electoral district

- Constituency for the Khyber Pakhtunkhwa Assembly
- Region: Sam Rani Zai Tehsil and Uthman Khel Tehsil (partly) of Malakand District

Current constituency
- Party: Pakistan Tehreek-e-Insaf
- Member(s): Musavir Khan
- Created from: PK-98 Malakand-I(before 2018); PK-19 Malakand-II (2018-2023)

PK-24 Malakand-II (پی کے-24 ملاکنڈ-2) is a constituency for the Khyber Pakhtunkhwa Assembly of the Khyber Pakhtunkhwa province of Pakistan.

== See also ==
- PK-23 Malakand-I
- PK-25 Buner-I
