= PK-60 Mardan-VII =

Pakistani electoral district

- Constituency for the Khyber Pakhtunkhwa Assembly
- Region: Takht Bhai Tehsil (partly) including Takht-i-Bahi Town in Mardan District

Current constituency
- Party: Pakistan Tehreek-e-Insaf
- Member(s): Iftikhar Ali Mushwani
- Created from: PK-26 Mardan-IV (2002-2018); PK-54 Mardan-VII (2018-2023)

PK-60 Mardan-VII (پی کے-60 مردان-7) is a constituency for the Khyber Pakhtunkhwa Assembly of the Khyber Pakhtunkhwa province of Pakistan.

== See also ==
- PK-59 Mardan-VI
- PK-61 Mardan-VIII
