= Aisha Naeem =

Pakistani politician

Parliamentary Secretary (Public Health Engineering)
- In office 3 September 2013 – 28 May 2018

Member of the Provincial Assembly of Khyber Pakhtunkhwa
- In office 13 August 2018 – 18 January 2023
- In office 31 May 2013 – 28 May 2018

Personal details
- Party: PTI (2013-present)
- Occupation: Politician

Aisha Naeem is Pakistani politician hailing from Swabi District, belong to Pakistan Tehreek-e-Insaf. She served as a Parliamentary Secretary in Public Health Engineering department and member of the 10th and 11th Provincial Assemblies of Khyber Pakhtunkhwa.

She has received matriculation level education.

She was re-elected to the Provincial Assembly of Khyber Pakhtunkhwa as a candidate of PTI on a reserved seat for women in the 2018 Pakistani general election.
