= Sardar Khan (Pakistan Muslim League (N) politician) =

Pakistani politician

Sardar Khan

Member-elect of the Provincial Assembly of Khyber Pakhtunkhwa
- In office 24 October 2018 – 18 January 2023
- Constituency: PK-3 (Swat-II)

Personal details
- Born: Khwazakhela, Swat
- Party: Pakistan Muslim League (N)
- Children: 3

Sardar Khan is a Pakistani politician who had been a member of the Provincial Assembly of Khyber Pakhtunkhwa from October 2018 till January 2023.

== Political career ==
Khan was elected to the Provincial Assembly of Khyber Pakhtunkhwa from the constituency PK-3 in the 2018 Pakistani by-elections on the ticket of Pakistan Muslim League (N).
