= Sumaiyah Bibi =

Pakistani politician

Member of the Provincial Assembly of Khyber Pakhtunkhwa
- In office 15 October 2018 – 18 January 2023
- Constituency: Reserved for women

Personal details
- Party: PTI (2018-present)

Sumaiyah Bibi is a Pakistani politician who had been a member of the Provincial Assembly of Khyber Pakhtunkhwa from October 2018 to January 2023.

== Political career ==
Sumaiyah was elected to the Provincial Assembly of Khyber Pakhtunkhwa as a candidate of Pakistan Tehreek-e-Insaf (PTI) on a reserved seat for women in consequence of the 2018 Pakistani general election. She assumed the membership of the assembly on 15 October 2018.
