= PK-32 Kohistan Lower =

Pakistani electoral district

- Constituency for the Khyber Pakhtunkhwa Assembly
- Region: Lower Kohistan District

Current constituency
- Party: Pakistan Tehreek-e-Insaf
- Member(s): Abdul Ghaffar
- Created from: PK-61 Kohistan-I (2002-2018); PK-26 Kohistan Lower (2018-2023)

PK-32 Kohistan Lower (پی کے-32 کوہستان زیریں) is a constituency for the Khyber Pakhtunkhwa Assembly of the Khyber Pakhtunkhwa province of Pakistan.

== See also ==
- PK-31 Kohistan Upper
- PK-33 Kolai Palas
