= PK-6 Swat-IV =

Pakistani electoral district

- Constituency for the Khyber Pakhtunkhwa Assembly
- Region: Mingora City of Swat District

Current constituency
- Member(s): Fazal Hakim
- Created from: PK-80 Swat-I (2002-2018); PK-5 Swat-IV (2018-2023)

PK-6 Swat-IV (پی کے-6، سوات-4)is a constituency for the Khyber Pakhtunkhwa Assembly of the Khyber Pakhtunkhwa province of Pakistan.

== See also ==
- PK-5 Swat-III
- PK-7 Swat-V
