= Sajida Haneef =

Pashtun politician

Member of the Provincial Assembly of Khyber Pakhtunkhwa
- In office 13 August 2018 – 18 January 2023
- Constituency: Reserved seat for women

Personal details
- Born: Sajida Haneef; 14 September 1954 (age 71) Mardan, KPK, Pakistan
- Party: PTI (2018-present)

Sajida Haneef is a Pashtun politician from the city of Mardan within Mardan District in Khyber Pakhtunkhwa, Pakistan who had been a member of the Provincial Assembly of Khyber Pakhtunkhwa from August 2018 till August 2023.

== Political career ==
She was elected to the Provincial Assembly of Khyber Pakhtunkhwa as a candidate of the PTI on a reserved seat for women in the 2018 general election.
