= Musavir Khan =

Pakistani politician

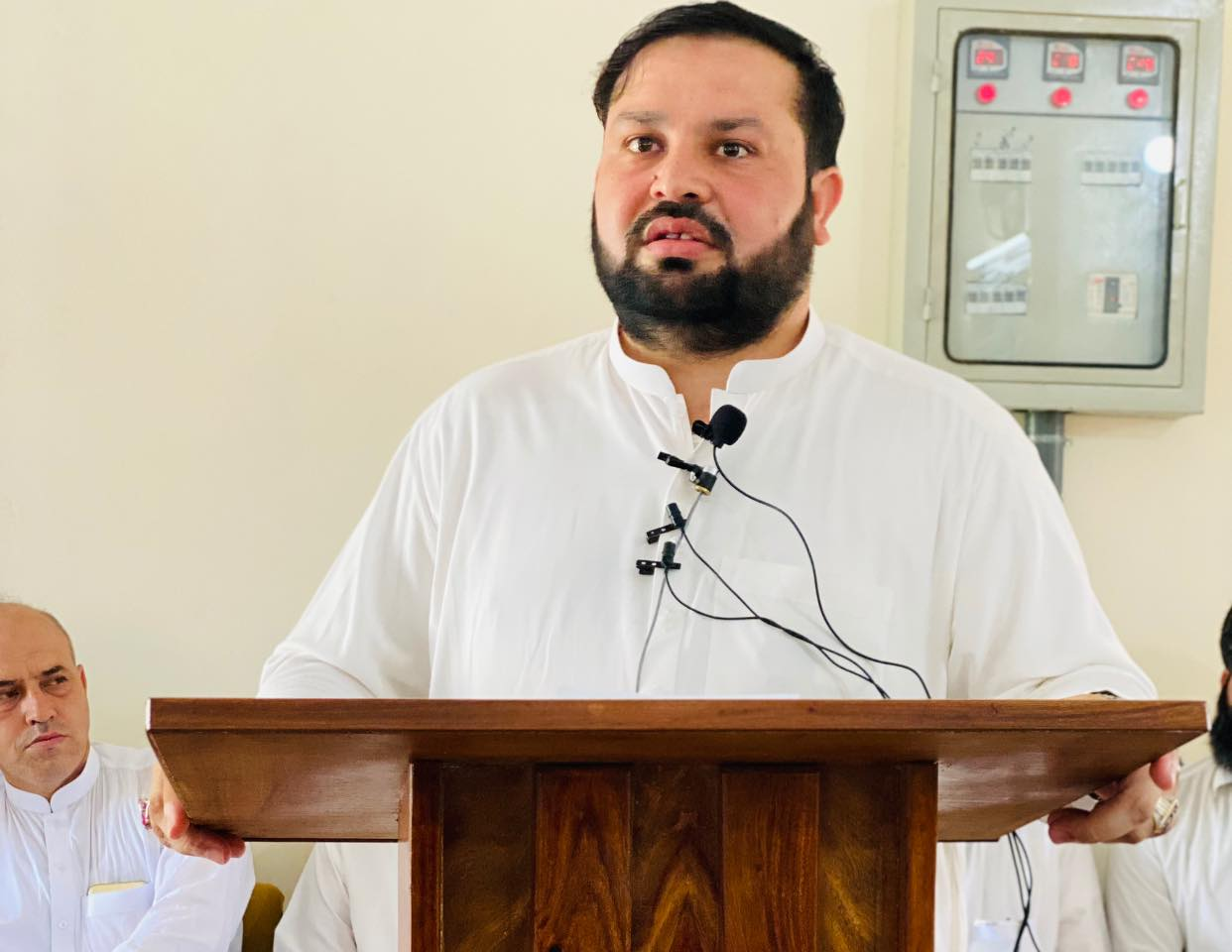

Member of the Provincial Assembly of Khyber Pakhtunkhwa
- In office 13 August 2018 – 18 January 2023
- Constituency: PK-19 (Malakand Protected Area-II)

President of PTI, Malakand District
- In office 9 June 2020 – 2022
- Chairman: Imran Khan; Gohar Ali Khan
- Succeeded by: Fazal Hakim

Personal details
- Born: Malakand District, Khyber Pakhtunkhwa, Pakistan
- Party: PTI (2018-present)

Pir Musavir Khan Ghazi is a Pakistani politician who had been a member of the Provincial Assembly of Khyber Pakhtunkhwa from August 2018 till January 2023.

== Political career ==
He was elected to the Provincial Assembly of Khyber Pakhtunkhwa as a candidate of Pakistan Tehreek-e-Insaf from Constituency PK-19 (Malakand Protected Area-II) in the 2018 Pakistani general election.
