= PK-5 Swat-III =

Pakistani electoral district

- Constituency for the Khyber Pakhtunkhwa Assembly
- Region: Babuzai and Charbagh Tehsils (partly) of Swat District

Current constituency
- Member(s): Azizullah Khan
- Created from: PK-81 Swat-II (2002–2018); PK-4 Swat-III (2018–2023)

PK-5 Swat-III (پی کے-5، سوات-3) is a constituency for the Khyber Pakhtunkhwa Assembly of the Khyber Pakhtunkhwa province of Pakistan.

== See also ==
- PK-4 Swat-II
- PK-6 Swat-IV
