= PK-82 Peshawar-XI =

Pakistani electoral district

- Constituency for the Khyber Pakhtunkhwa Assembly
- Region: Peshawar city area of Peshawar District

Current constituency
- Party: Pakistan Tehreek-e-Insaf
- Member(s): Malik Tariq Awan
- Created from: PK-01 Peshawar-I (2002-2018); PK-76 Peshawar-XI (2018-2022)

PK-82 Peshawar-XI (پی کے-82 پشاور-11) is a constituency for the Khyber Pakhtunkhwa Assembly of the Khyber Pakhtunkhwa province of Pakistan.

== See also ==
- PK-81 Peshawar-X
- PK-83 Peshawar-XII
