= Fahim Ahmad (politician) =

Pakistani politician

Member of the Provincial Assembly of Khyber Pakhtunkhwa
- In office 13 August 2018 – 18 January 2023
- Constituency: PK-72 (Peshawar-VII)

Personal details
- Party: PTI-P (2025-present)
- Other political affiliations: PTI (2018-2022)

Fahim Ahmad is a Pakistani politician who had been a member of the Provincial Assembly of Khyber Pakhtunkhwa from August 2018 till January 2023.

== Political career ==
He was elected to the Provincial Assembly of Khyber Pakhtunkhwa as a candidate of Pakistan Tehreek-e-Insaf from Constituency PK-72 (Peshawar-VII) in the 2018 Pakistani general election.
