= Nawabzada Farid Salahuddin =

Pakistani politician

Nawabzada Farid Salahuddin Tanoli

Member of the Provincial Assembly of Khyber Pakhtunkhwa
- In office 13 August 2018 – 18 January 2023
- Constituency: PK-33 (Mansehra-IV)

Personal details
- Party: IPP (2025-present)
- Other political affiliations: PTI (2018-2023)

Nawabzada Farid Salahuddin Tanoli is a Pakistani politician who had been a member of the Provincial Assembly of Khyber Pakhtunkhwa from August 2018 till January 2023. He left PTI and contested in the 2024 elections but lost to the PTI backed candidate Ikramullah.

== Political career ==
He was elected to the Provincial Assembly of Khyber Pakhtunkhwa as a candidate of Pakistan Tehreek-e-Insaf from Constituency PK-33 (Mansehra-IV) in the 2018 Pakistani general election.
