= Nadia Sher =

Pakistani politician

Member of the Provincial Assembly of Khyber Pakhtunkhwa
- In office 29 May 2013 – 28 May 2018
- Constituency: Reserved seat for women

Personal details
- Party: PTI-P (2023-present)
- Other political affiliations: Pakistan Tehreek-e-Insaf (2018-2023)

Nadia Sher Khan (Urdu: نادیہ شیر خان) is a Pakistani politician who had been a Member of the Provincial Assembly of Khyber Pakhtunkhwa from May 2013 to May 2018.

== Education ==
She has received matriculation level education.

== Political career ==
She was elected to the Provincial Assembly of Khyber Pakhtunkhwa as a candidate of Pakistan Tehreek-e-Insaf (PTI) on a reserved seat for women in the 2013 Pakistani general election. In September 2013, she was made Parliamentary Secretary of Khyber Pakhtunkhwa Assembly for Population Welfare.

In May 2016, Sher joined a resolution to establish a Women's Caucus in the Provincial Assembly of Khyber Pakhtunkhwa.

She was re-elected to the Provincial Assembly of Khyber Pakhtunkhwa as a candidate of PTI on a reserved seat for women in the 2018 Pakistani general election and quit the PTI on 24 May 2023 due to pressure of Army Chief Asim Munir.

On 13 May 2024, the Election Commission of Pakistan (ECP) suspended her membership as a member of the Provincial Assembly of the Khyber Pakhtunkhwa. This action followed a Supreme Court of Pakistan decision to suspend the verdict of the Peshawar High Court, which had denied the allocation of a reserved seat to the PTI-Sunni Ittehad Council bloc.
