= PK-72 Peshawar-I =

Pakistani electoral district

- Constituency for the Khyber Pakhtunkhwa Assembly
- Region: Mathra Tehsil (partly) of Peshawar District

Current constituency
- Party: Pakistan Tehreek-e-Insaf
- Member: Mehmood Jan Deputy Speaker KPK Assembly
- Created from: PK-07 Peshawar-VII (2002–2018); PK-66 Peshawar-I (2018–2022)

PK-72 Peshawar-I (پی کے-72 پشاور-1) is a constituency for the Khyber Pakhtunkhwa Assembly of the Khyber Pakhtunkhwa province of Pakistan.

== Election results ==
=== 2018 ===
the following show results of election 2018

contesting candidates	party affiliation	votes polled
Mehmood Jan	Pakistan Tehreek-e-insaf	19146
Hashmat Khan	Muttahida majlis-e-amal	11434
Kiramat Ullah Khan	Pakistan peoples party	10108
Liaqat Ali Khan	awami national party	7157
Saif Ullah Khan	JUI-S	2110
Muhammad Hashim Babar	Qaumi watan party	2033
Arbab Sheryar Khan	Independent	1457
Syed Abbas Ali Shah	tehreek-e-jawanan party	1218
Syed Liaqat Hussain Shah	Pakistan Muslim league (N)	534
Wisal Khan	Independent	46
total	55243	

=== 2013 ===
The following table shows the names of candidates, their parties and the votes they secured in the general elections held on May 11, 2013.

Contesting candidates	Party affiliation	Votes polled
Ziaullah Khan	Pakistan Tehreek-e-Insaf	22932
Muhammad Nadeem	Pakistan Muslim League (J)	6907
Bahrullah Khan	Jamaat-e-Islami Pakistan	5156
Akhunzada Irfan Ullah Shah	Jamiat Ulema-e Islam (F)	4819
Ghazanfar Bilour	Awami National Party	4782
Muhammad Akbar Khan	Pakistan Peoples Party Parliamentarians	4376
Muhammad Adeel	Pakistan Muslim League (N)	1571
Muhammad Zakir Shah	Independent	1063
Ashfaq Ahmad	MDM	334
Muhammad Shah Zeb	Independent	252
Saif Ullah	Pakistan Muslim League (Q)	249
Muhammad Nadeem	Independent	234
Ajmal Khan	TTP	227
Abdul Aziz Khan	Independent	198
Muhammad Nadeem	Qaumi Watan Party	178
Irfan Ullah	Independent	72
Younas Khan	Independent	63
Malik Parvez Khan	Independent	55
Mosab Mukhtar	Independent	29
Zafar Ullah	Independent	28
Mir Alam Khan	APML	26
Zahoor Khan	MP	21
Yasar Farid	JUP-N	20
Gul Jan	Independent	16
Muhammad Younas	Independent	14
Hassan Khan	Independent	12
Abdur Rahim Khan	Independent	6

=== 2008 ===
Candidate	Party	Votes
Zia Ullah Afridi	Pakistan Tehreek-e-Insaf	22922
Malik Muhammad Nadeem	Qaumi Watan Party	6886
Bahrullah Khan Advocate	Jamaat-e-Islami	5148
Akhuzandada Irfan Ullah Shah	Jamiat Ulema-e-Islam (F)	4812
Ghazanfar Bilour	Awami National Party	4779
Malik Adeel Awan	Pakistan Muslim League (N)	1571
Dr. Zakir Shah	Independents	1063
Ashfaq Ahmad Saraf	Mutahida Deeni Mahaz	333
Engineer Shah Zeb	Independents	252
Qari Saif Ullah	Pakistan Muslim League	249
Irfan Ullah	Pakistan Muslim League (J)	234
Muhammad Ajmal Khan	Tehreek-E-Tahfuz-E-Pakistan	227
Abdul Aziz Khan	Independents	198
Malik Muhammad Nadeem	Independents	178
Irfan Ullah	Independents	72
Younas Hayat Khan Yousafzai	Independents	63
Malik Parvez Khan	Independents	55
Mosab Mukhtar	Independents	29
Zafar Ullah	Independents	28
Mir Alam Khan	All Pakistan Minorities Alliance	26
Zahoor Khan	Mustaqbil Pakistan	21
Yasar Farid Awan	Jamiat Ulama-E-Pakistan (Noorani)	20
Gul Jan	Independents	16
Muhammad Younas Akakhail	Independents	14
Hassan Khan Alias Mian Jee`	Independents	12
Total		53,176
Registered voters/turnout		127437/53590 (43.6%)
Source:Awaztoday.com

== See also ==
- PK-71 Khyber-III
- PK-73 Peshawar-II
