= Zahoor Shakir =

Pakistani politician

Muhammad Zahoor

Member of the Provincial Assembly of Khyber Pakhtunkhwa
- In office 13 August 2018 – 18 January 2023
- Constituency: PK-84 (Hangu-II)

Personal details
- Party: Pakistan Tehreek-e-Insaf Parliamentarians (2023–present)
- Other political affiliations: Pakistan Tehreek-e-Insaf (2018–2023)

Muhammad Zahoor Shakir is a Pakistani politician who has been a member of the Provincial Assembly of Khyber Pakhtunkhwa from August 2018 to January 2023.

== Political career ==
He was elected to the Provincial Assembly of Khyber Pakhtunkhwa as a candidate of Pakistan Tehreek-e-Insaf from Constituency PK-84 (Hangu-II) in the 2018 Pakistani general election.

In 2023, his party membership was cancelled due to party policy violations.
