= PK-73 Peshawar-II =

Pakistani electoral district

- Constituency for the Khyber Pakhtunkhwa Assembly
- Region: Mathra Tehsil (partly) and Shah Alam Tehsil (partly) of Peshawar District

Current constituency
- Party: Pakistan Tehreek-e-Insaf
- Member: Arbab Muhammad Wasim Khan
- Created from: PK-08 Peshawar-VIII (2002-2018); PK-67 Peshawar-II (2018-2022)

PK-73 Peshawar-II (پی کے-73 پشاور-2) is a constituency for the Khyber Pakhtunkhwa Assembly of the Khyber Pakhtunkhwa province of Pakistan.

== Election 2013 ==
Contesting candidates	Party affiliation	Votes polled
Arbab Akber Hayat	Pakistan Muslim League (N)	13528
Asif Iqbal Daud Zai	Jamiat Ulema-e-Islam (F)	10458
Haji Jehanzeb Khan	Pakistan Tehreek-e-Insaf	9335
Malik Tehmash Khan	Pakistan Peoples Party Parliamentarians	8324
Fazal Ullah Dawoodzai	Jamaat-e-Islami Pakistan	4769
Abdul Haseeb	MDM	3647
Arbab Nazir Ahmad Khan	Awami National Party	2712
Muhammad Shafi	Qaumi Watan Party	1888
Shaukat Ali	TTP	423
Muhammad Zaman Awan	JUP-N	231
Khawaja Muhammad Amin	Independent	219
Kamran Khan	IIP	206
Sayed Muhammad Israr Khan	Independent	141
Muhammad Jamal	Independent	89
Anwar Gul Anwar Sardar Farooqi	Pakistan Muslim League (J)	59
Malik Ferdos Khan	Independent	53
Muhammad Saeed	Independent	41
Hidayat Ur Rehman Kashaf	Pakistan Muslim League (Q)	41
Nasir Khan	Independent	29
Rafaqat Ullah	Independent	22

== See also ==
- PK-72 Peshawar-I
- PK-74 Peshawar-III
