= PK-83 Peshawar-XII =

Pakistani electoral district

- Constituency for the Khyber Pakhtunkhwa Assembly
- Region: Qissa Khwani and old city areas of Peshawar City in Peshawar District

Current constituency
- Party: Pakistan Tehreek-e-Insaf
- Member: Kamran Khan Bangash
- Created from: PK-02 Peshawar-II (2002-2018); PK-77 Peshawar-XII (2018-2023)

PK-83 Peshawar-XII (پی کے-83 پشاور-12) is a constituency for the Khyber Pakhtunkhwa Assembly of the Khyber Pakhtunkhwa province of Pakistan.

== Elections 2013 ==
Contesting candidates	Party affiliation	Votes polled
Shaukat Ali Yousaf Zai	Pakistan Tehreek-E-Insaf	27442
Syed Zahir Ali Shah	Pakistan Peoples Party Parliamentarians	11489
Malik Ghulam Mustafa	Awami National Party	6269
Molana Kherul Bashar	Jamiat Ulama-E-Islam (F)	4240
Mian Syed Badshah	Pakistan Muslim League (N)	3164
Saeed Ur Rehman	Safimutahida Deeni Mahaz	2781
Siraj Ud Din	Jamaat-E-Islami Pakistan	2451

== See also ==
- PK-82 Peshawar-XI
- PK-84 Peshawar-XIII
