= PK-55 Mardan-II =

Pakistani electoral district

- Constituency for the Khyber Pakhtunkhwa Assembly
- Region: Rustam Tehsil and Mardan Tehsil (partly) of Mardan District

Current constituency
- Party: Pakistan Tehreek-e-Insaf
- Member(s): Tufail Anjum
- Created from: PK-29 Mardan-VII (2002-2018); PK-49 Mardan-II (2018-2023)

PK-55 Mardan-II (پی کے-55 مردان-2) is a constituency for the Khyber Pakhtunkhwa Assembly of the Khyber Pakhtunkhwa province of Pakistan.

== See also ==
- PK-54 Mardan-I
- PK-56 Mardan-III
