= PK-112 Dera Ismail Khan-II =

Pakistani electoral district

- Constituency for the Khyber Pakhtunkhwa Assembly
- Region: Dera Ismail Khan Tehsil (partly) and Paharpur Tehsil (partly) of Dera Ismail Khan District

Current constituency
- Created from: PK-65 Dera Ismail Khan-II (2002-2018); PK-96 Dera Ismail Khan-II (2018-2023)

PK-112 Dera Ismail Khan-II (پی کے-112، ڈیرہ اسماعیل خان-2) is a constituency for the Khyber Pakhtunkhwa Assembly of the Khyber Pakhtunkhwa province of Pakistan.

== Elections 2024 ==
Provincial election 2024: PK-112 Dera Ismail Khan-II
| Party | Candidate | Votes | % | ±% |
|---|---|---|---|---|
| PPP | Ahmad Kundi | 34,319 | 37.79 | |
| JUI (F) | Sami Ullah | 25,360 | 27.40 | |
| Independent | Ali Amin Gandapur (Note: Filed nomination papers as PTI candidate but ECP allowed him to run as an Independent) | 23,780 | 26.78 | |
| TLP | Muhammad Shafiq Ul Hai | 4,994 | 5.40 | |
| Others | Others (sixteen candidates) | 4,093 | 4.42 | |
| Turnout | | 96,123 | 59.54 | |
| Total valid votes | | 92,540 | 96.27 | |
| Rejected ballots | | 3,653 | 3.73 | |
| Majority | | 7,952 | 3.45 | |
| Registered electors | | 161,566 | | |
| PPP hold | | | | |

== See also ==
- PK-111 Dera Ismail Khan-I
- PK-113 Dera Ismail Khan-III
