= Sher Azam Khan =

Pakistani politician

Member of the Provincial Assembly of Khyber Pakhtunkhwa
- In office 13 August 2018 – 18 January 2023
- Constituency: PK-87 (Bannu-I)
- In office 20 March 2008 – 20 March 2013
- Constituency: PK-71 (Bannu-II)

Personal details
- Party: PTI-P (2023-present)
- Other political affiliations: PPP (2008-2023)

Sher Azam Khan is a Pakistani politician who had been a member of the Provincial Assembly of Khyber Pakhtunkhwa from March 2008 to March 2013 and from August 2018 to January 2023.

== Political career ==
He was elected to the Provincial Assembly of Khyber Pakhtunkhwa as a candidate of Pakistan Peoples Party from Constituency PK-87 (Bannu-I) in the 2018 Pakistani general election.
