= Amjad Ali (Pakistani politician) =

Pakistani politician

Provincial Minister of Housing of Khyber Pakhtunkhwa
- Incumbent
- Assumed office 31 October 2025

Provincial Minister of Khyber Pakhtunkhwa for Mines and Minerals Development
- In office 29 August 2018 – 18 January 2023

Member of the Provincial Assembly of Khyber Pakhtunkhwa
- Incumbent
- Assumed office 29 February 2024
- Constituency: PK-7 (Swat-V)
- In office 13 August 2018 – 18 January 2023
- Constituency: PK-6 (Swat-V)
- In office 29 May 2013 – 28 May 2018
- Constituency: PK-82 (Swat-III)

Personal details
- Party: PTI (2013-present)

Amjad Ali is a Pakistani politician who is the current Provincial Minister of Khyber Pakhtunkhwa for Mines and Minerals Development, in office since 29 August 2018. He had been a member of the Provincial Assembly of Khyber Pakhtunkhwa from August 2018 till January 2023.

Previously, he was a member of the Provincial Assembly of Khyber Pakhtunkhwa from May 2013 to May 2018.

== Early life and education ==
He was born on 4 October 1973 in village Zarkhila of Shamozai area of Barikot TehsilSwat District, Pakistan.His father Muzaffar Ali was a school teacher and later became principalbefore retirement. He belongs to a well known family.

He holds DHMS degree.

== Political career ==
He was elected to the Provincial Assembly of Khyber Pakhtunkhwa as a candidate of Pakistan Tehreek-e-Insaf (PTI) from Constituency PK-82 (Swat-III) in the 2013 Pakistani general election. He received 15,086 votes and defeated Waqar Ahmad Khan, a candidate of Awami National Party (ANP).

He was re-elected to the Provincial Assembly of Khyber Pakhtunkhwa as a candidate of PTI from Constituency PK-6 (Swat-V) in the 2018 Pakistani general election.

On 29 August 2018, he was inducted into the provincial Khyber Pakhtunkhwa cabinet of Chief Minister Mahmood Khan and was appointed as Provincial Minister of Khyber Pakhtunkhwa for Mines and Minerals Development.
