= PK-3 Swat-I =

Pakistani electoral district

- Constituency for the Khyber Pakhtunkhwa Assembly
- Region: Bahrain Tehsil, Khwazakhela Tehsil (partly) of Swat District
- Electorate: 2,12,787

Current constituency
- Created from: PK-85 Swat-VI (2002–2018); PK-2 Swat-I (2018–2023)

PK-3 Swat-I (پی کے-3، سوات-1) is a constituency for the Khyber Pakhtunkhwa Assembly of the Khyber Pakhtunkhwa province of Pakistan.

== Election 2024 ==
General elections are scheduled to be held on 8 February 2024.

General election 2024: PK-3 Swat-I
Party	Candidate	Votes	%	±%
JI	Habib Ullah			
PPP	Said Hakeem Shah			
JUI (F)	Bakht Zada			
ANP	Jafar Shah			
PML(N)	Jehangir			
Pakistan Markazi Muslim League	Fazal Ullah			
Independent	Nawazish Ali			
Independent	Sharafat Ali			
Turnout				
Rejected ballots				
Majority				
Registered electors		2,12,787		

== See also ==
- PK-2 Lower Chitral
- PK-4 Swat-II
