= Shahida Waheed =

Pakistani politician

Member of the Provincial Assembly of Khyber Pakhtunkhwa
- In office 13 August 2018 – 18 January 2023
- Constituency: Reserved for women

Personal details
- Party: PMLN (2025-present)
- Other political affiliations: ANP (2018-2025)

Shahida Waheed is a Pakistani politician who had been a member of the Provincial Assembly of Khyber Pakhtunkhwa from August 2018 till January 2023.

== Political career ==
Shahida was elected to the Provincial Assembly of Khyber Pakhtunkhwa as a candidate of Awami National Party (ANP) on a reserved seat for women in consequence of the 2018 Pakistani general election. She assumed the membership of the assembly on 13 August 2018.
