= Bahadar Khan =

Pakistani politician

Member of the Provincial Assembly of Khyber Pakhtunkhwa
- In office 13 August 2018 – 18 January 2023
- Constituency: PK-16 (Lower Dir-IV)

Personal details
- Party: ANP

Bahadar Khan is a Pakistani politician who had been a member of the Provincial Assembly of Khyber Pakhtunkhwa from August 2018 till January 2023. He was also member of provincial assembly of Khyber Pakhtunkhwa in 1993-1996 and 1997-1999 from Lower Dir. He is Currently the district president of Awami National Party Lower Dir.

== Political career ==
He was elected to the Provincial Assembly of Khyber Pakhtunkhwa as a candidate of Awami National Party from Constituency PK-16 (Lower Dir-IV) in the 2018 Pakistani general election.
