= PK-59 Mardan-VI =

Pakistani electoral district

- Constituency for the Khyber Pakhtunkhwa Assembly
- Region: Mardan, Takht Bhai and Katlang Tehsils (partly) of Mardan District

Current constituency
- Party: Pakistan Tehreek-e-Insaf
- Member(s): Muhammad Abdul Salam
- Created from: PK-30 Mardan-VIII (2002–2018); PK-53 Mardan-VI (2018–2023)

PK-59 Mardan-VI (پی کے-59 مردان-6) is a constituency for the Khyber Pakhtunkhwa Assembly of the Khyber Pakhtunkhwa province of Pakistan.

== See also ==
- PK-58 Mardan-V
- PK-60 Mardan-VII
