= Shagufta Malik =

Pakistani politician

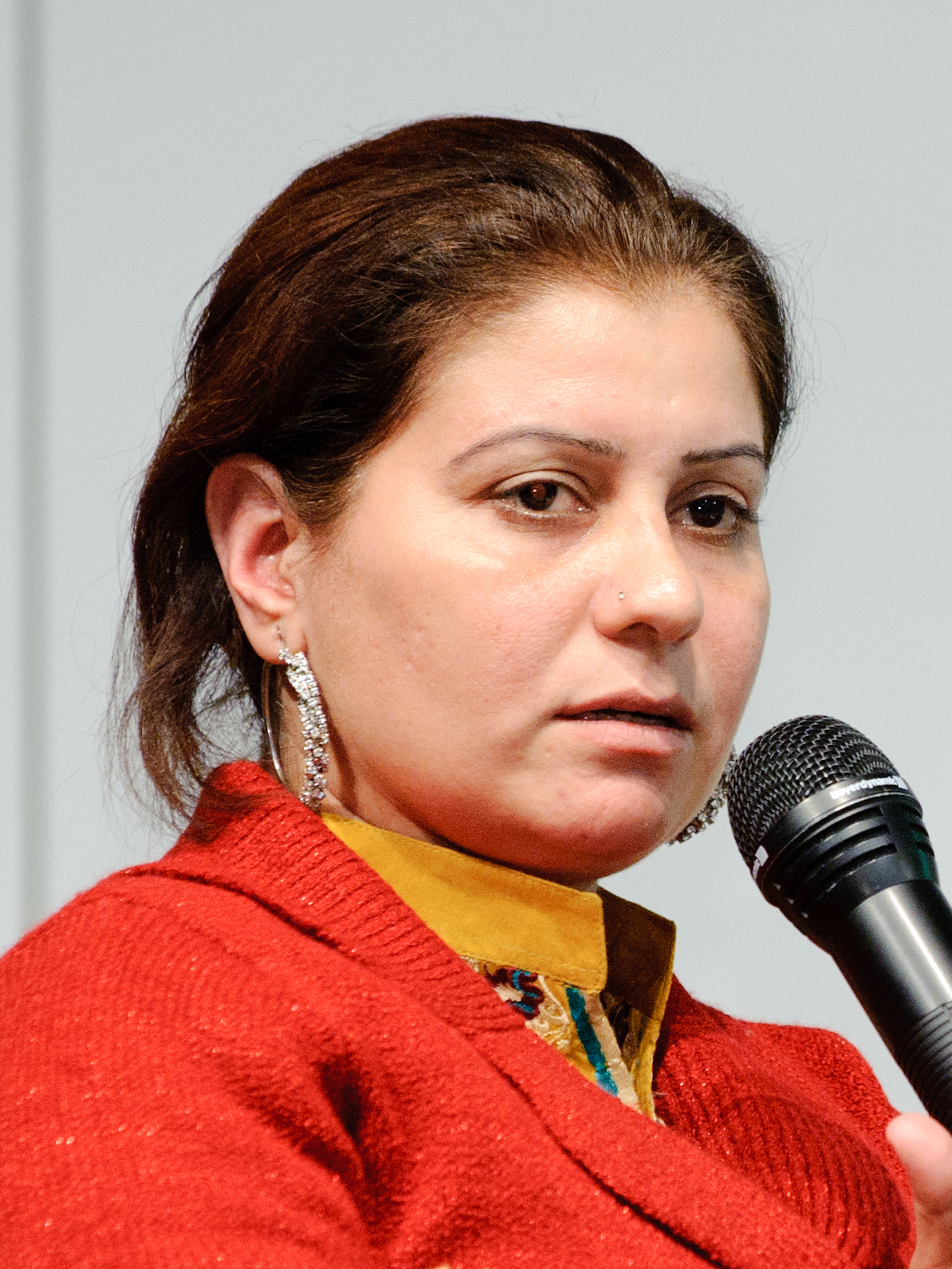

Member of the Provincial Assembly of Khyber Pakhtunkhwa
- In office 13 August 2018 – 18 January 2023
- Constituency: Reserved seat for women

Personal details
- Party: AP (2025-present)
- Other political affiliations: ANP (2018-2025)

Shagufta Malik is a Pakistani politician who had been a member of the Provincial Assembly of Khyber Pakhtunkhwa from August 2018 to January 2023.

== Education ==
She has done Masters in political science.

== Political career ==
She was elected to the Provincial Assembly of Khyber Pakhtunkhwa as a candidate of Awami National Party on a reserved seat for women in the 2018 Pakistani general election.
