= PK-114 Dera Ismail Khan-IV =

Pakistani electoral district

- Constituency for the Khyber Pakhtunkhwa Assembly
- Region: Dera Ismail Khan Tehsil (partly) Parora Tehsil of Dera Ismail Khan District

Current constituency
- Seats: 1
- Created from: PK-64 Dera Ismail Khan-III (2002-2018); PK-98 Dera Ismail Khan-IV (2018-2023)

PK-114 Dera Ismail Khan-IV (پی کے-114، ڈیرہ اسماعیل خان-4) is a constituency for the Khyber Pakhtunkhwa Assembly of the Khyber Pakhtunkhwa province of Pakistan.

== See also ==
- PK-113 Dera Ismail Khan-III
- PK-115 Dera Ismail Khan-V
