= PK-93 Hangu-II =

Pakistani electoral district

- Former constituency for the Khyber Pakhtunkhwa Assembly
- Region: Thal Tehsil of Hangu District

Former constituency
- Created: 2002
- Abolished: 2023
- Party: Pakistan Tehreek-e-Insaf
- Member: Muhammad Zahoor
- Created from: PK-43 Hangu-II (2002-2018); PK-84 Hangu-II (2018-2023)

PK-93 Hangu-II (پی کے-93 ہنگو-2) is a constituency for the Khyber Pakhtunkhwa Assembly of the Khyber Pakhtunkhwa province of Pakistan.

== See also ==
- PK-92 Hangu-I
- PK-94 Orakzai
