= Sobia Shahid =

Pakistani politician

Member of the Provincial Assembly of Khyber Pakhtunkhwa
- In office 13 August 2018 – 18 January 2023
- Constituency: Reserved seat for women
- In office 29 May 2013 – 28 May 2018

Personal details
- Party: PMLN (2013-present)

Sobia Shahid (Urdu: ثوبیہ شاہد) is a Pakistani politician who had been a Member of the Provincial Assembly of Khyber Pakhtunkhwa, from August 2018 to January 2023 and from May 2013 to May 2018.

== Education ==
She has a master's degree.

== Political career ==
Shahid was elected to the Provincial Assembly of Khyber Pakhtunkhwa as a candidate of Pakistan Muslim League (N) (PML-N) on a reserved seat for women in 2013 Pakistani general election.

In 2015, Shahid was noted as the most active woman member in the Khyber Pakhtunkhwa Assembly. In May 2016, she joined a resolution to establish a Women's Caucus in the Provincial Assembly of Khyber Pakhtunkhwa.

Shahid was re-elected to the Provincial Assembly of Khyber Pakhtunkhwa as a candidate of PML-N on a reserved seat for women in the 2018 Pakistani general election.

On 13 May 2024, the Election Commission of Pakistan (ECP) suspended the membership of Shahid as a member of the National Assembly. This action followed a Supreme Court of Pakistan decision to suspend the verdict of the Peshawar High Court, which had denied the allocation of a reserved seat to the PTI-Sunni Ittehad Council bloc.

== Personal life ==
Shahid is married and as of 2005, has three children.
