= PK-2 Lower Chitral =

Pakistani electoral district

- Constituency for the Khyber Pakhtunkhwa Assembly
- Region: Lower Chitral District
- Electorate: 1,83,361

Current constituency
- Created from: PK-89 Chitral-I

PK-2 Lower Chitral (پی کے-2، چترال زیریں) is a constituency for the Khyber Pakhtunkhwa Assembly of the Khyber Pakhtunkhwa province of Pakistan. It covers the area of Lower Chitral District.

== Election 2024 ==
General elections for PK-2 Lower Chitral were held on February 8, 2024, and Fateh-ul-Mulk Ali Nasir, an independent candidate, won by securing 28,510 votes.

General election 2024: PK-2 Lower Chitral
Party	Candidate	Votes	%	±%
JI	Maghfirat Shah	13,243		
PPP	Saleem Khan	22,995		
JUI (F)	Faiz Muhammad Maqsood	19,882		
PTI-P	Shahzada Khalid Parvez	12,767		
PRHP	Iftikhar Hussain	112		
Independent	Muhammad Hussain	91		
Independent	Fateh-ul-Mulk Ali Nasir	28,510		
Independent	Luke Rehmat	852		
Turnout		101,675	55.45	
Total votes		101,675		
Rejected ballots		3,223		
Majority		5,515		
Registered electors		183,361		

== 2018 Pakistan General Election ==
General election 2018: PK-1 Chitral
Party	Candidate	Votes	%	±%
MMA	Hidayat ur Rehman	45,629		
PTI	Israr ud Din	40,490		
PPP	Ghulam Muhammad	30,500		
PML(N)	Abdul Wali Khan Abid	16,293		
APML	Sohrab Khan	11,052		
ANP	Sardar Ahmad Khan	5,051		
Pakistan Rah-e-haq Party	Siraj ud Din	3,737		
Independent	Shafiq ur Rehman	1,698		
Independent	Amir Ullah	1,450		
Independent	Saadat Hussain	1,012		
PSP	Atta Ullah	668		
Independent	Syed Sardar Hussain Shah	589		
Independent	Abdur Rehman	297		
Independent	Wazir Khan	213		
Independent	Misbah ud Din	175		
Independent	Shahzada Aman ur Rehman	127		
Turnout		158,981	60.97	

== See also ==
- PK-1 Upper Chitral
- PK-3 Swat-I
