= PK-63 Charsadda-II =

Pakistani electoral district

- Constituency for the Khyber Pakhtunkhwa Assembly
- Region: Tangi Tehsil (partly) and Charsadda Tehsil (partly) of Charsadda District

Current constituency
- Party: Awami National Party
- Member(s): Shakeel Bashir Khan
- Created from: PK-19 Charsadda-III (2002-2018); PK-57 Charsadda-II (2018-2023)

PK-63 Charsadda-II (پی کے-63 چارسدہ-2) is a constituency for the Khyber Pakhtunkhwa Assembly of the Khyber Pakhtunkhwa province of Pakistan.

== See also ==
- PK-62 Charsadda-I
- PK-64 Charsadda-III
