= PK-33 Kolai Palas =

Pakistani electoral district

- Constituency for the Khyber Pakhtunkhwa Assembly
- Region: Kolai-Palas District

Current constituency
- Party: Pakistan Muslim League (Q)
- Member(s): Mufti Ubaid ur Rahman
- Created from: PK-62 Kohistan-II (before 2018); PK-27 Kolai Palas (2018-2022)

PK-33 Kolai Palas (پی کے-33 کولئ پالس) is a constituency for the Khyber Pakhtunkhwa Assembly of the Khyber Pakhtunkhwa province of Pakistan.

== See also ==
- PK-32 Kohistan Lower
- PK-34 Battagram-I
