= Shah Dad Khan =

Pakistani politician

Member of the Provincial Assembly of Khyber Pakhtunkhwa
- In office 13 August 2018 – 18 January 2023
- Constituency: PK-81 (Kohat-II)

Personal details
- Born: Lachi District Kohat
- Party: Jamiat Ulema-e-Islam (F)
- Parent: Shad khan (father)

Shah Dad Khan is a Pakistani politician born in Lachi District Kohat who had been a member of the Provincial Assembly of Khyber Pakhtunkhwa from August 2018 to January 2023. Shah Dad is the retired major of Pakistan army.

== Political career ==
He was elected to the Provincial Assembly of Khyber Pakhtunkhwa as a candidate of Muttahida Majlis-e-Amal from Constituency PK-81 (Kohat-II) in the 2018 Pakistani general election.
