= Momina Basit =

Pakistani politician

Member of the Provincial Assembly of Khyber Pakhtunkhwa
- In office August 2018 – January 2023
- Constituency: Reserved seat for women

Personal details
- Party: PTI (2018-present)

Momina Basit is a Pakistani politician who was a member of the Provincial Assembly of Khyber Pakhtunkhwa from August 2018 until January 2023. She is a chairperson of the standing committee on Zakat, Ushr, Social Welfare & Women Empowerment department in KP. She is the former president of the Women Wing Hazara and also a member of the central executive committee of the PTI.

== Education ==
She has received O-level education.

== Political career ==
She was elected to the Provincial Assembly of Khyber Pakhtunkhwa as a candidate of Pakistan Tehreek-e-Insaf (PTI) on a reserved seat for women in the 2018 Pakistani general election.
