= Kamran Khan Bangash =

Pakistani politician

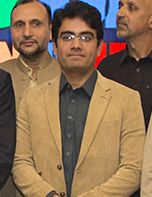

Provincial Minister for Higher Education, Archives & Libraries
- In office 11 July 2020 – 18 January 2023

Provincial Minister of Khyber Pakhtunkha for Local Government and Rural Development
- In office 27 May 2019 – 18 January 2023

Member of the Provincial Assembly of Khyber Pakhtunkhwa
- In office 13 August 2018 – 18 January 2023
- Constituency: PK-77 (Peshawar-XII)

Personal details
- Party: PTI (2006-present)
- Education: Edwardes College Peshawar

Kamran Khan Bangash is a Pakistani politician who had been a member of the Provincial Assembly of Khyber Pakhtunkhwa from August 2018 till January 2023.

== Early life and education ==
He was born on 5 December 1987 in Hangu, Pakistan.

He received a degree of Bachelor of Computer Science in 2008.

== Political career ==
Bangash joined Pakistan Tehreek-e-Insaf (PTI) in 2006 and headed the party's social media in Khyber Pakhtunkhwa from 2007 to 2010.

He was elected to the Provincial Assembly of Khyber Pakhtunkhwa as a candidate of PTI from Constituency PK-77 (Peshawar-XII) in the 2018 Pakistani general election.

On 26 August 2018, he was named by the PTI as Provincial Minister of Khyber Pakhtunkhwa for Information Technology. However his name was dropped from the cabinet on the day of oath taking ceremony on 29 August. On 30 August, he was named as Special Assistant to the Chief Minister of Khyber Pakhtunkhwa Mahmood Khan on Information Technology. On 14 September 2018, he was appointed as special assistant to the chief minister on science and technology and information technology. On 11 July 2020, he has been appointed as Provincial Minister for Information and has been considered as the best Information minister of the decade for the province.

Later in the same year on Friday, 18 September 2020, he was given the responsibility of revamping the Ministry of Higher Education, Archives, & Libraries.

Bangash previously managed the Khyber Pakhtunkhwa provincial ministries of Higher Education, Archives & Libraries and of Information & Press Releases.
