= Sitara Afreen =

Pakistani politician

Member of the Provincial Assembly of Khyber Pakhtunkhwa
- Incumbent
- Assumed office 13 August 2018
- Constituency: Reserved seat for women

Personal details
- Party: PTI (2018-2024) and 2024 till now in jui-F

Sitara Afreen is a Pakistani politician who has been a member of the Provincial Assembly of Khyber Pakhtunkhwa since August 2018, and was re-elected to the next assembly, from 2024 - 2029.

== Education ==
She has received middle-level education.

== Political career ==
She was elected to the Provincial Assembly of Khyber Pakhtunkhwa as a candidate of Pakistan Tehreek-e-Insaf (PTI) on a reserved seat for women in the 2018 Pakistani general electionand was also the chairman standing committee on social welfare ushr zakar and women empowerment .

She was again elected on the platform of jui-f from 2024 till present as member provincial assembly
