= Shakeel Bashir Khan =

Pakistani politician

Member of the Provincial Assembly of Khyber Pakhtunkhwa
- In office 13 August 2018 – 18 January 2023
- Constituency: PK-57 (Charsadda-II)

Personal details
- Party: ANP

Shakeel Bashir Khan is a Pakistani politician who had been a member of the Provincial Assembly of Khyber Pakhtunkhwa from August 2018 till January 2023.

== Early life ==
He was born into a Pashtun family of the Umarzai (Muhammadzai) tribe, sub-clan of the Kheshgi (Charsadda) tribe. He is the son of Muhammad Bashir Khan.

== Political career ==
He was elected to the Provincial Assembly of Khyber Pakhtunkhwa as a candidate of Awami National Party from Constituency PK-57 (Charsadda-II) in the 2018 Pakistani general election.
