= Abdul Karim (Khyber Pakhtunkhwa politician) =

Pakistani politician

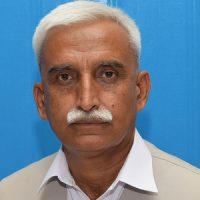

Member of the Provincial Assembly of Khyber Pakhtunkhwa
- In office 13 August 2018 – 18 January 2023
- Constituency: PK-45 (Swabi-III)

Personal details
- Party: PTI (2018-present)
- Other political affiliations: QWP (2013-2018)
- Occupation: Politician

Abdul Karim Khan Tordher (Urdu: عبد الکریم خان تورڈھر) is a Pakistani politician hailing from Tordher, Swabi District. He is served as a member of the Provincial Assembly of Khyber Pakhtunkhwa from August 2018 till January 2023 and Advisor to the Chief Minister on Industries. He belongs to the PTI.

On 14 September 2018, he was appointed as special assistant to the Chief Minister of Khyber Pakhtunkhwa Mahmood Khan for commerce and industries.

== Education ==
Abdul Karim earned his degree in BA.

== Political career ==
In 2013, he was elected to the Khyber Pakhtunkhwa Assembly on the ticket of Qaumi Watan Party. In 2018, he left Qaumi Watan Party to join Pakistan Tehreek-e-Insaf.

In 2018, he was re-elected to the KPK assembly on the ticket of Pakistan Tehreek-e-Insaf.
