= Rehana Ismail =

Pakistani politician

Member of the Provincial Assembly of Khyber Pakhtunkhwa
- In office 13 August 2018 – 18 January 2023
- Constituency: Reserved seat for women

Personal details
- Party: Jamiat Ulema-e-Islam (F)

Rehana Ismail is a Pakistani politician who had been a member of the Provincial Assembly of Khyber Pakhtunkhwa from August 2018 to January 2023.

== Education ==
She has a degree of master in Islamic Studies.

== Political career ==
She was elected to the Provincial Assembly of Khyber Pakhtunkhwa as a candidate of Muttahida Majlis-e-Amal on a reserved seat for women in the 2018 Pakistani general election.
