= PK-23 Malakand-I =

Pakistani electoral district

- Constituency for the Khyber Pakhtunkhwa Assembly
- Region: Thana Baizai, Swat Rani Zai Tehsils and Agra UC of Utman Khel Tehsil of Malakand District

Current constituency
- Party: Pakistan Tehreek-e-Insaf
- Member: Shakeel Ahmad
- Created from: PK-99 Malakand-II (before 2018) PK-18 Malakand-I (2018–2022)

PK-23 Malakand-I (پی کے-23 ملاکنڈ-1) is a constituency for the Khyber Pakhtunkhwa Assembly of the Khyber Pakhtunkhwa province of Pakistan.

== See also ==
- PK-22 Bajaur-IV
- PK-24 Malakand-II
