= PK-58 Mardan-V =

Pakistani electoral district

- Constituency for the Khyber Pakhtunkhwa Assembly
- Region: Mardan City and Cantonment area of Mardan District

Current constituency
- Party: Pakistan Tehreek-e-Insaf
- Member: abdusalam Afridi
- Created from: PK-23 Mardan-I (2002-2018); PK-52 Mardan-V (2018-2023)

PK-58 Mardan-V (پی کے-58 مردان-5) is a constituency for the Khyber Pakhtunkhwa Assembly of the Khyber Pakhtunkhwa province of Pakistan.

== See also ==
- PK-57 Mardan-IV
- PK-59 Mardan-VI
