= Azizullah Khan =

Pakistani politician

MPA Azizullah Khan

Parliamentary Secretary in Housing Department to Chief Minister
- In office 17 June 2016 – 28 May 2018

Member of the Khyber Pakhtunkhwa Assembly
- In office 13 August 2018 – 18 January 2023
- Constituency: PK-4 Swat-III
- In office 29 May 2013 – 28 May 2018
- Constituency: PK-81 Swat-II

Personal details
- Born: 15 February 1962 (age 64) Swat, Khyber Pakhtunkhwa, Pakistan
- Party: PTI (2013-present)
- Occupation: Politician

Azizullah Khan (Urdu: عزيز اللہ خان: born 15 February 1962) is a Pakistani politician hailing from Swat District, brother of the great politician of Swat and close friend of imran Khan former prime minister of pakistan, Ali Khan Khan lala. Aziz ullah khan had been a member of the Provincial Assembly of Khyber Pakhtunkhwa from August 2018 till January 2023. He also served as a member of the 10th Provincial Assembly of Khyber Pakhtunkhwa, belonging to the Pakistan Tehreek-e-Insaf.

== Political career ==
Khan was elected as the member of the Khyber Pakhtunkhwa Assembly on ticket of Pakistan Tehreek-e-Insaf from PK-81 Swat-II in the 2013 Pakistani general election.

In the 2024 general election the ticket was issued to Aziz ullah khan by Ali Ameen Khan gandapur, and then ticket was taken and give it to advocate Akhtar khan, who is member of Khyber pakhtunkhwah assembly.
