= Aisha Bano =

Pakistani politician

Ayesha Bano

Member of the Provincial Assembly of Khyber Pakhtunkhwa
- In office 13 August 2018 – 18 January 2023
- Constituency: Reserved seat for women

Personal details
- Born: 24 January 1977 (age 49) Peshawar, Khyber Pakhtunkhwa, Pakistan
- Party: PTI (2018-present)
- Education: LLB
- Occupation: Politician
- Profession: Social worker

Ayesha Bano is a Pakistani politician. She had been a member of the Provincial Assembly of Khyber Pakhtunkhwa from August 2018 till January 2023. She has been a president of PTI Women Wing Peshawar Region. She was born on 24 January 1977. She graduated Law in 2002.

== Political career ==
She was elected to the Provincial Assembly of Khyber Pakhtunkhwa as a candidate of Pakistan Tehreek-e-Insaf (PTI) on a reserved seat for women in the 2018 Pakistani general election.
