= Rabia Basri (politician) =

Pakistani politician

Member of the Provincial Assembly of Khyber Pakhtunkhwa
- In office 13 August 2018 – 18 January 2023
- Constituency: Reserved seat for women

Personal details
- Party: PTI (2018-present)

Rabia Basri is a Pakistani politician who was a member of the Provincial Assembly of Khyber Pakhtunkhwa from August 2018 till January 2023.

== Education ==
She has received matriculation level education.

== Political career ==
She was elected to the Provincial Assembly of Khyber Pakhtunkhwa as a candidate of Pakistan Tehreek-e-Insaf (PTI) on a reserved seat for women in the 2018 Pakistani general election.
