= Sharafat Ali =

Pakistani politician

Member of the Provincial Assembly of Khyber Pakhtunkhwa
- Incumbent
- Assumed office 29 February 2024
- Constituency: PK-3 ( SWAT-I)
- In office 13 August 2018 – 18 January 2023
- Constituency: PK-2 (Swat-I)

Personal details
- Born: 1 May 1974 (age 52)
- Party: PTI (2018-present)

Sharafat Ali is a Pakistani politician who had been a member of the Provincial Assembly of Khyber Pakhtunkhwa from August 2018 till January 2023.

== Political career ==
He was elected to the Provincial Assembly of Khyber Pakhtunkhwa as a candidate of Pakistan Tehreek-e-Insaf from Constituency PK-2 (Swat-I) in the 2018 Pakistani general election.
