= Sahibzada Sanaullah =

Pakistani politician

Member of the Provincial Assembly of Khyber Pakhtunkhwa
- In office 13 August 2018 – 18 January 2023
- Constituency: PK-11 (Upper Dir-II)
- In office 2015 – 28 May 2018
- Constituency: Constituency PK-93 (Upper Dir-III)

Personal details
- Party: PPP

Sahibzada Sanaullah is a Pakistani politician who had been a member of the Provincial Assembly of Khyber Pakhtunkhwa, from August 2018 till January 2023. He had also been a member of the Provincial Assembly of Khyber Pakhtunkhwa from 2015 to May 2018.

== Education ==
He has a Bachelor of Arts degree.

== Political career ==
He ran for the seat of the Provincial Assembly of Khyber Pakhtunkhwa as a candidate of Pakistan Peoples Party (PPP) from Constituency PK-93 (Upper Dir-III) in the 2013 Pakistani general election but was unsuccessful. He received 9,799 votes and lost the seat to Malik Behram Khan, a candidate of Jamaat-e-Islami Pakistan (JI).

He was elected to the Provincial Assembly of Khyber Pakhtunkhwa as a candidate of PPP from Constituency PK-93 (Upper Dir-III) in by-polls held in September 2015. He received 21,788 votes and defeated Azam Khan, a candidate of JI.

He was re-elected to Provincial Assembly of Khyber Pakhtunkhwa as a candidate of PPP from Constituency PK-11 (Upper Dir-II) in the 2018 Pakistani general election.
