= PK-7 Swat-V =

Pakistani electoral district

Constituency PK-7 Swat-V
- Constituency for the Khyber Pakhtunkhwa Assembly
- Region: Barikot Tehsil and Kabal and Babuzai Tehsils (partly) of Swat District

Current constituency
- Created from: PK-82 Swat-III (2002-2018); PK-6 Swat-V (2018-2023)

PK-7 Swat-V (پی کے-7، سوات-5) is a constituency for the Khyber Pakhtunkhwa Assembly of the Khyber Pakhtunkhwa province of Pakistan.

== See also ==
- PK-6 Swat-IV
- PK-8 Swat-VI
