= PK-56 Mardan-III =

Pakistani electoral district

- Constituency for the Khyber Pakhtunkhwa Assembly
- Region: Garhi Kapoora Tehsil and Mardan Tehsil (partly) of Mardan District

Current constituency
- Party: Pakistan Tehreek-e-Insaf
- Member(s): Atif Khan Senior Minister
- Created from: PK-25 Mardan-III (2002–2018); PK-50 Mardan-III (2018–2023)

PK-56 Mardan-III (پی کے-56 مردان-3) is a constituency for the Khyber Pakhtunkhwa Assembly of the Khyber Pakhtunkhwa province of Pakistan.

== See also ==
- PK-55 Mardan-II
- PK-57 Mardan-IV
