= PK-84 Peshawar-XIII =

Pakistani electoral district

- Constituency for the Khyber Pakhtunkhwa Assembly
- Region: Peshawar city area of Peshawar District

Current constituency
- Party: Awami National Party
- Member: Samar Haroon Bilour
- Created from: PK-03 Peshawar-III (2002-2018); PK-78 Peshawar-XIII (2018-2023)

PK-84 Peshawar-XIII (پی کے-84 پشاور-13) is a constituency for the Khyber Pakhtunkhwa Assembly of the Khyber Pakhtunkhwa province of Pakistan.

== Elections 2013 ==
Contesting candidates	Party affiliation	Votes
Javed Nasim	Pakistan Tehreek-E-Insaf	18080
Haroon Bashir Bilour	Awami National Party	15291
Khalid Gul Mohmand	Jamaat-E-Islami Pakistan	4748
Molana Muhammad Ismail Darwesh	Mutahida Deeni Mahaz	3830
Haji Muhammad Iqbal Mohmnd	Pakistan Peoples Party Parliamentarians	2769
Al Haj Abdul Jalil Jan	Jamiat Ulama-E-Islam (F)	1964
Khadim Ali Khan Yousafzai	Pakistan Muslim League (N)	1408

== See also ==
- PK-83 Peshawar-XII
- PK-85 Nowshera-I
