= PK-25 Buner-I =

Pakistani electoral district

- Constituency for the Khyber Pakhtunkhwa Assembly
- Region: Gadezai Tehsil and Daggar Tehsil (partly) of Buner District

Current constituency
- Party: Pakistan Tehreek-e-Insaf
- Member(s): Riaz Khan
- Created from: PK-79 Buner-III (2002–2018); PK-20 Buner-I (2018–2023)

PK-25 Buner-I (پی کے-25 بونیر-1) is a constituency for the Khyber Pakhtunkhwa Assembly of the Khyber Pakhtunkhwa province of Pakistan.

== See also ==
- PK-26 Buner-II
- PK-27 Buner-III
