= Nighat Orakzai =

Pakistani politician (born 1962)

Member of the Provincial Assembly of Khyber Pakhtunkhwa
- In office November 2002 – 18 January 2023
- Constituency: Reserved seat for women

Personal details
- Born: 17 July 1962 (age 63) Peshawar, Khyber Pakhtunkhwa
- Party: Pakistan Peoples Party (2002-2008; since 2012)
- Other political affiliations: Pakistan Muslim League (Q) (2000-2002; 2008-2012); Pakistan Muslim League (J) (1997-2000)

Nighat Orakzai (Urdu: نگہت اورکزئی; born 17 July 1962) is a Pakistani politician who had been a Member of the Provincial Assembly of Khyber Pakhtunkhwa from 2002 till January 2023.

== Early life ==
Orakzai was born on 17 July 1962 in Peshawar, Khyber Pakhtunkhwa.

She has a master's degree in Urdu and Islamic Studies and worked in the Pakistan Atomic Energy Commission, TCS Courier, and National Bank of Oman.

She married in 1989.

== Political career ==
Orakzai began her political career in 1993. She joined the Pakistan Muslim League (J) in 1997 as the party's general secretary of women's wing in Khyber Pakhtunkhwa. She joined the Pakistan Muslim League (Q) (PML-Q) in 2000 and became president of the part's women's wing in Khyber Pakhtunkhwa in 2002.

Orakzai was elected to the Provincial Assembly of Khyber Pakhtunkhwa as a candidate of Pakistan Peoples Party (PPP) on a reserved seat for women in the 2002 Pakistani general election.

Orakzai was re-elected to the Provincial Assembly of Khyber Pakhtunkhwa as a candidate of PML-Q on a reserved seat for women in the 2008 Pakistani general election. During her tenure as Member of the Pakhtunkhwa Assembly, she remained deputy parliamentary leader of PML-Q.

She served as information secretary of PML-Q in Khyber Pakhtunkhwa until she resigned in December 2012. She also quit the PML-Q to join PPP.

She was re-elected to the Provincial Assembly of Khyber Pakhtunkhwa as a candidate of PPP on a reserved seat for women in the 2013 Pakistani general election.

She was re-elected to the Provincial Assembly of Khyber Pakhtunkhwa as a candidate of PPP on a reserved seat for women in the 2018 Pakistani general election.
