= Anwar Hayat Khan =

Pakistani politician

MPA Anwar Hayat Khan

Member of the Provincial Assembly of Khyber Pakhtunkhwa
- In office 13 August 2018 – 18 January 2023
- Constituency: PK-93 (Lakki Marwat-III)
- In office 31 May 2013 – 28 May 2018
- Constituency: Constituency PK-74 (Lakki Marwat-I)

Personal details
- Party: Jamiat Ulema-e-Islam (F)
- Occupation: Politician

Anwar Hayat Khan (Urdu: انور حيات خان) is a Pakistani politician who was a member of the Provincial Assembly of Khyber Pakhtunkhwa from May 2013 to May 2018 and from August 2018 to January 2023 belonging to the Jamiat Ulema-e-Islam (F). He also served as a member of different committees.

== Political career ==
Anwar Hayat Khan was elected to the Khyber Pakhtunkhwa assembly's PK-74 Lakki Marwat-I seat on the ticket of (Jamiat Ulama-e-Islam (F) in 2013 General Elections. He was re-elected in the 2018 General Elections on the ticket of Muttahida Majlis-e-Amal (a political alliance consisting of conservative, Islamist, religious, and far-right parties).
