= PK-31 Kohistan Upper =

Pakistani electoral district

- Constituency for the Khyber Pakhtunkhwa Assembly
- Region: Upper Kohistan District

Current constituency
- Party: Pakistan Tehreek-e-Insaf
- Member: Fazal e Haq
- Created from: PK-63 Kohistan-III (2002-2018); PK-25 Upper Kohistan (2018-2023)

PK-31 Kohistan Upper ( پی کے-31 کوہستان بالائی) is a constituency for the Provincial Assembly of Khyber Pakhtunkhwa in Pakistan.

== See also ==
- PK-30 Shangla-III
- PK-32 Kohistan Lower
