= PK-57 Mardan-IV =

Pakistani electoral district

- Constituency for the Khyber Pakhtunkhwa Assembly
- Region: Mardan city (partly) in Mardan Tehsil of Mardan District

Current constituency
- Party: Pakistan Tehreek-e-Insaf
- Member: Muhammad Zahir Shah
- Created from: PK-24 Mardan-II (2002-2018); PK-51 Mardan-IV (2018-2023)

PK-57 Mardan-IV (پی کے-57 مردان-4) is a constituency for the Khyber Pakhtunkhwa Assembly of the Khyber Pakhtunkhwa province of Pakistan.

== General elections 2024 ==
2024 Khyber Pakhtunkhwa provincial election: PK-57 Mardan-IV
Party	Candidate	Votes	%	±%
PTI	Muhammad Zahir Shah	34,437	45.34%	▲15.37%
ANP	Ahmed Khan Bahadur	16,237	21.38%	▼7.16%
JUI (F)	Amanat Shah Haqqani	12,081	15.91%	▲0.55%
PPP	Umer Farooq Khan Hoti	10,621	13.98%	▲1.63%
Others	Others (combined 7 candidates)	2,574	3.39%	▼10.4%
Turnout		77,660	42.03%	▼1.36%
Total valid votes		75,950	98.61%	▲2.89%
Rejected ballots		1,710	1.39%	▼2.77%
Majority		18,200	23.96%	▲19.07%
Registered electors		184,760		▲19.39%
PTI hold				

== See also ==
- PK-56 Mardan-III
- PK-58 Mardan-V
