= PK-78 Peshawar-VII =

Pakistani electoral district

- Constituency for the Khyber Pakhtunkhwa Assembly
- Region: Peshtakhara Tehsil (partly) and Peshawar City Tehsil (partly) of Peshawar District

Current constituency
- Party: Pakistan Tehreek-e-Insaf
- Member: Fahim Ahmad
- Created from: PK-06 Peshawar-VI (before 2018) PK-72 Peshawar-VII (2018-2022)

PK-78 Peshawar-VII (پی کے-78 پشاور-7) is a constituency for the Khyber Pakhtunkhwa Assembly of the Khyber Pakhtunkhwa province of Pakistan.

== Elections 2013 ==
Contesting candidates	Party affiliation	Votes polled
Fazal Elahi	Pakistan Tehreek-E-Insaf	14870
Raees Khan	Independents	7506
Kashif Azam	Jamaat-E-Islami Pakistan	6056
Ashfaq Ahmad Khalil	Pakistan Peoples Party Parliamentarians (Patriots)	5198
Muhammad Zubair Khan	Jamiat Ulama-E-Islam (F)	5137
Muhammad Alamgir Khalil	Awami National Party	3535
Abdul Sattar Khan	Pakistan Muslim League (N)	3530
Manzoor Ali	Qaumi Watan Party (Sherpao)	2997
Zahoor Elahi	Muttahida Qaumi Movement Pakistan	1262

== See also ==
- PK-77 Peshawar-VI
- PK-79 Peshawar-VIII
