= PK-111 Dera Ismail Khan-I =

Pakistani electoral district

- Constituency for the Khyber Pakhtunkhwa Assembly
- Region: Paniala Tehsil and Paharpur Tehsil partly of Dera Ismail Khan District

Current constituency
- Number of members: 1
- Created from: PK-68 Dera Ismail Khan-V (2002-2018); PK-95 Dera Ismail Khan-I (2018-2023)

PK-111 Dera Ismail Khan-I (پی کے-111، ڈیرہ اسماعیل خان-1) is a constituency for the Khyber Pakhtunkhwa Assembly of the Khyber Pakhtunkhwa province of Pakistan.

== See also ==
- PK-110 Lower South Waziristan
- PK-112 Dera Ismail Khan-II
