= PK-4 Swat-II =

Pakistani electoral district

- Constituency for the Khyber Pakhtunkhwa Assembly
- Region: Khwaza Khela and Charbagh Tehsils (partly) of Swat District

Current constituency
- Member(s): Haider Ali Khan
- Created from: Constituency PK-86 Swat-VII (2002-2018); PK-3 Swat-I (2018-2023)

PK-4 Swat-II (پی کے-4، سوات-2) is a constituency for the Khyber Pakhtunkhwa Assembly of the Khyber Pakhtunkhwa province of Pakistan.

== See also ==
- PK-3 Swat-I
- PK-5 Swat-III
