= PK-17 Lower Dir-IV =

Pakistani political constituency

- Constituency for the Khyber Pakhtunkhwa Assembly
- Region: Munda Tehsil and Samar Bagh Tehsil (partly) of Lower Dir District

Current constituency
- Party: Pakistan Tehreek e Insaf
- Member: Ubaidur Rahman
- Created from: PK-95 Lower Dir-II (2002-2018); PK-16 Lower Dir-IV (2018-2023)

PK-17 Lower Dir-IV (پی کے-17 دیر زیریں-4) is a constituency for the Khyber Pakhtunkhwa Assembly of the Khyber Pakhtunkhwa province of Pakistan.

== Elections 2013 ==
The following table shows the names of candidates, their parties and the votes they secured in the general elections held on May 11, 2013.

Contesting candidates	Party affiliation	Votes polled
Siraj Ul Haq	Jamaat-e-Islami Pakistan	23030
Hidayat Ullah Khan	Awami National Party	11130
Ubeduallah Sajid	Pakistan Tehreek-e-Insaf	1917
Rehmat Ullah Khan	Pakistan Peoples Party Parliamentarians	676
Abdul Rehman Khan	Jamiat Ulama-e-Islam (F)	614
Doctor Didar Muhammad	Pakistan Muslim League (N)	190
Zia Ul Haq	MUTAHIDA DEENI MAHAZ	154
Noor Ali Jan	Independent	29
Ikram Ul Haq	Independent	17

== Elections 2008 ==
Hidayat Ullah Khan the candidate of Awami National Party won the elections.

== Elections 2002 ==
Siraj Ul Haq the candidate of MMA won the elections.

== See also ==
- PK-16 Lower Dir-III
- PK-18 Lower Dir-V
