= PK-14 Lower Dir-I =

Pakistani electoral district

- Constituency for the Khyber Pakhtunkhwa Assembly
- Region: Khall Tehsil and Balambat Tehsil (excluding Rabat) in Lower Dir District

Current constituency
- Party: Pakistan Tehreek-e-Insaf
- Member: Muhammad Azam Khan
- Created from: PK-96 Lower Dir-III (2002-2018); PK-13 Lower Dir-I (2018-2023)

PK-14 Lower Dir-I (پی کے-14 دیر زیریں-1) is a constituency for the Khyber Pakhtunkhwa Assembly of the Khyber Pakhtunkhwa province of Pakistan.

== Elections 2013 ==
The following table shows the names of candidates, their parties and the votes they secured in the general elections held on May 11, 2013.

Contesting candidates	Party affiliation	Votes polled
Saeed Gul	Jamaat-e-Islami Pakistan	14193
Muhammad Zamin Khan Advocate	Pakistan Peoples Party Parliamentarians	7391
Mubarak Jan Alias Khan Sherin	Pakistan Tehreek-e-Insaf	5085
Naeem Jan	Awami National Party	1295
Muhammad Shakir Ullah Khan	Jamiat Ulama-e-Islam (F)	625
Anwar Syed	Pakistan Muslim League (N)	229
Raheem Ullah	Independent	58
Muhammad Khan	Independent	56
Sayed Nasir Shah	Independent	19

== See also ==
- PK-13 Upper Dir-III
- PK-15 Lower Dir-II
