= Mardan Division =

Mardan Division مردان ڈویژن مردان څانګه
- Division
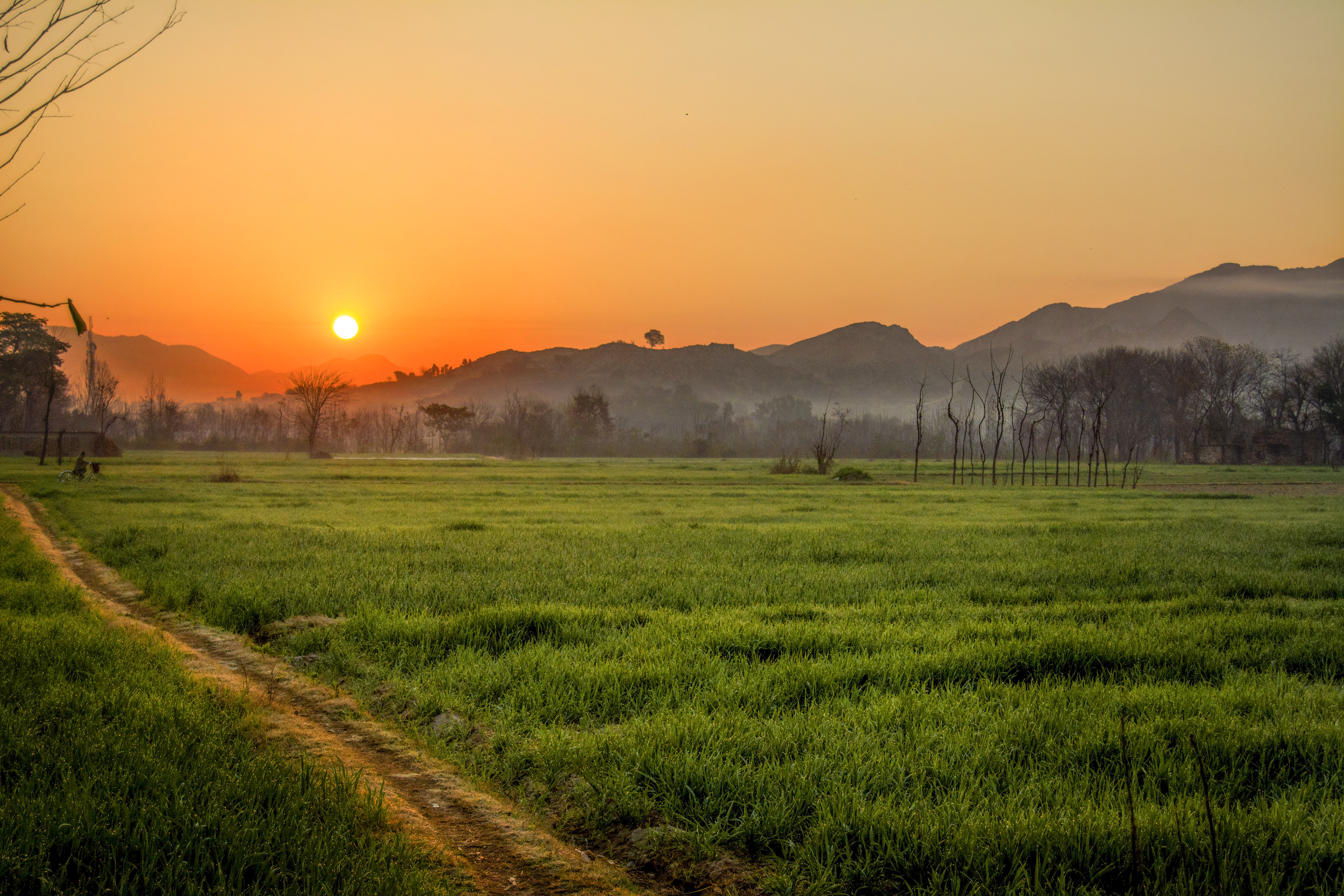
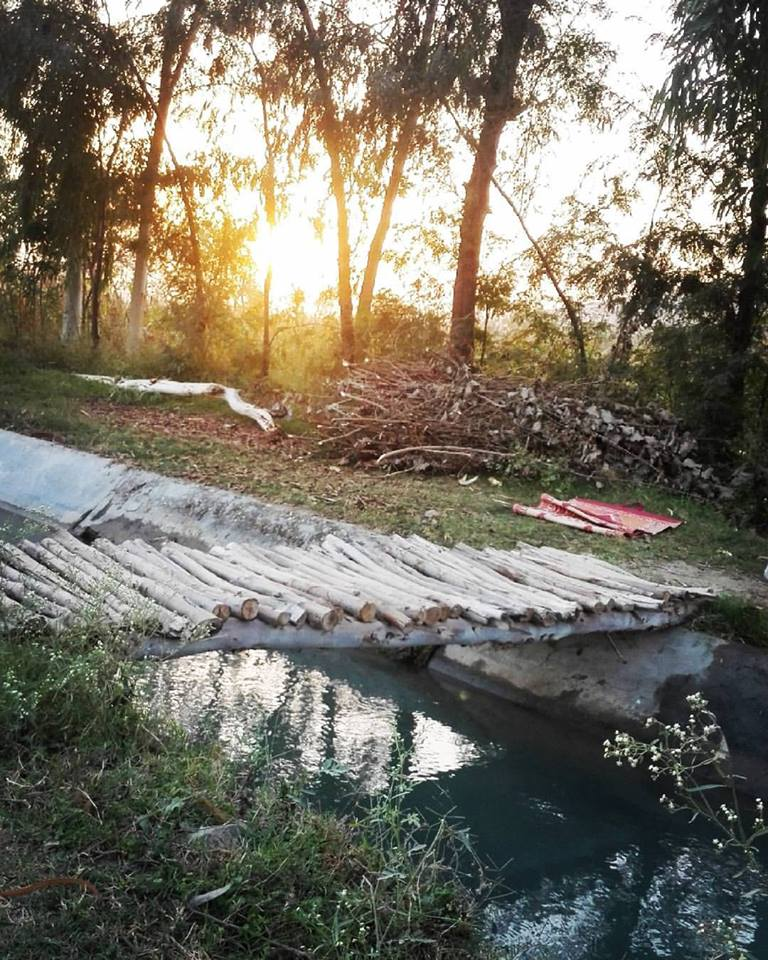
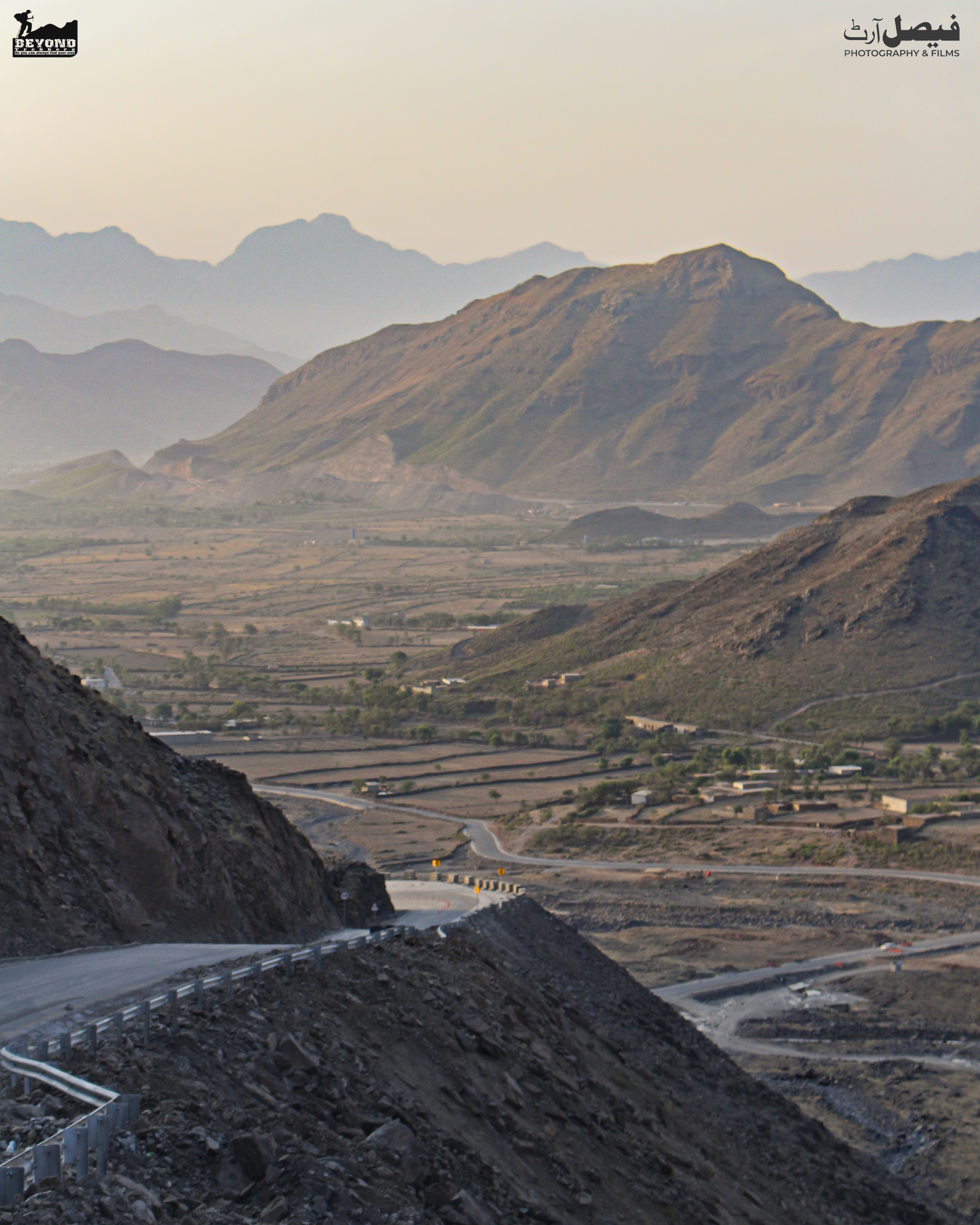
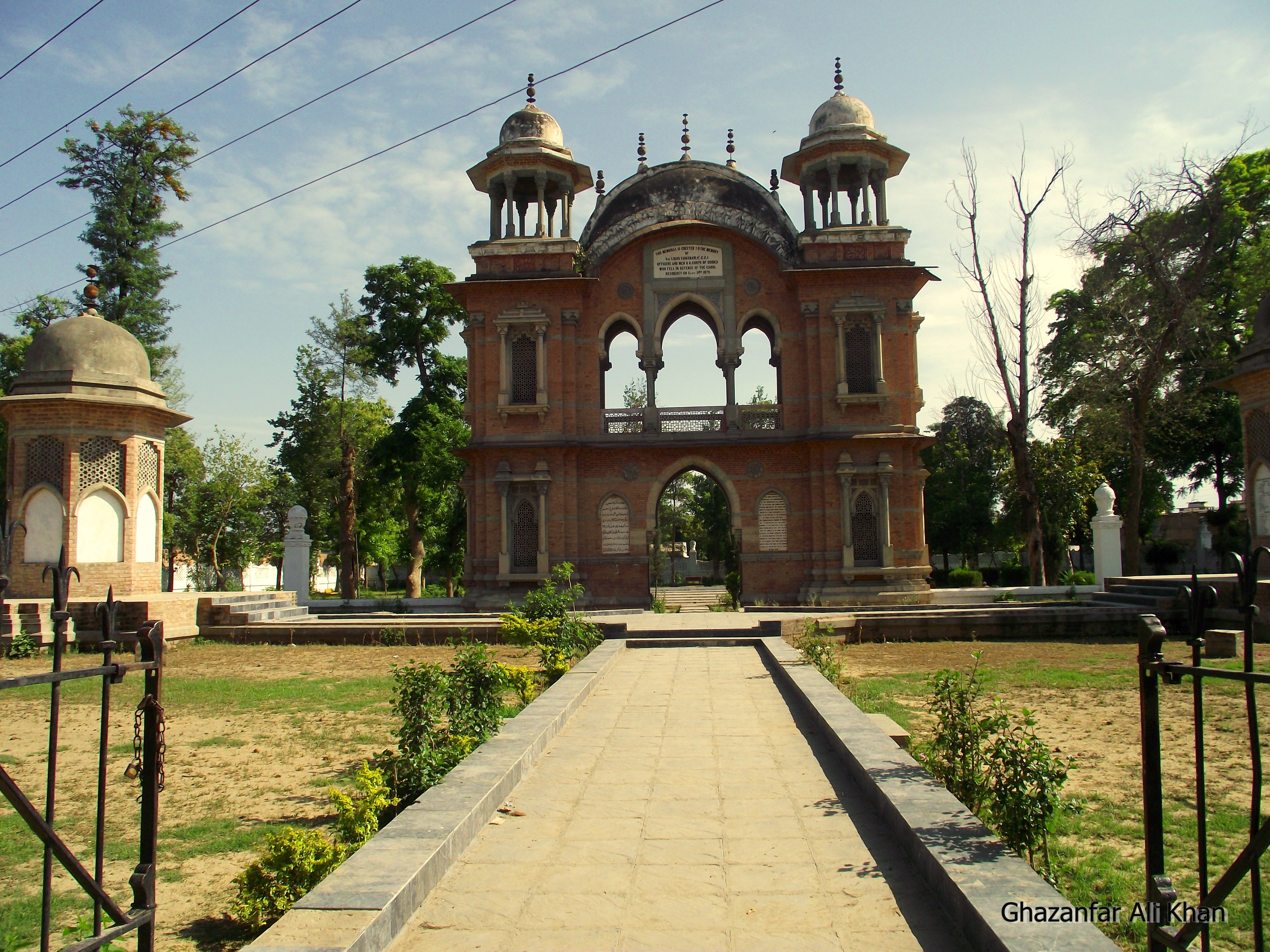
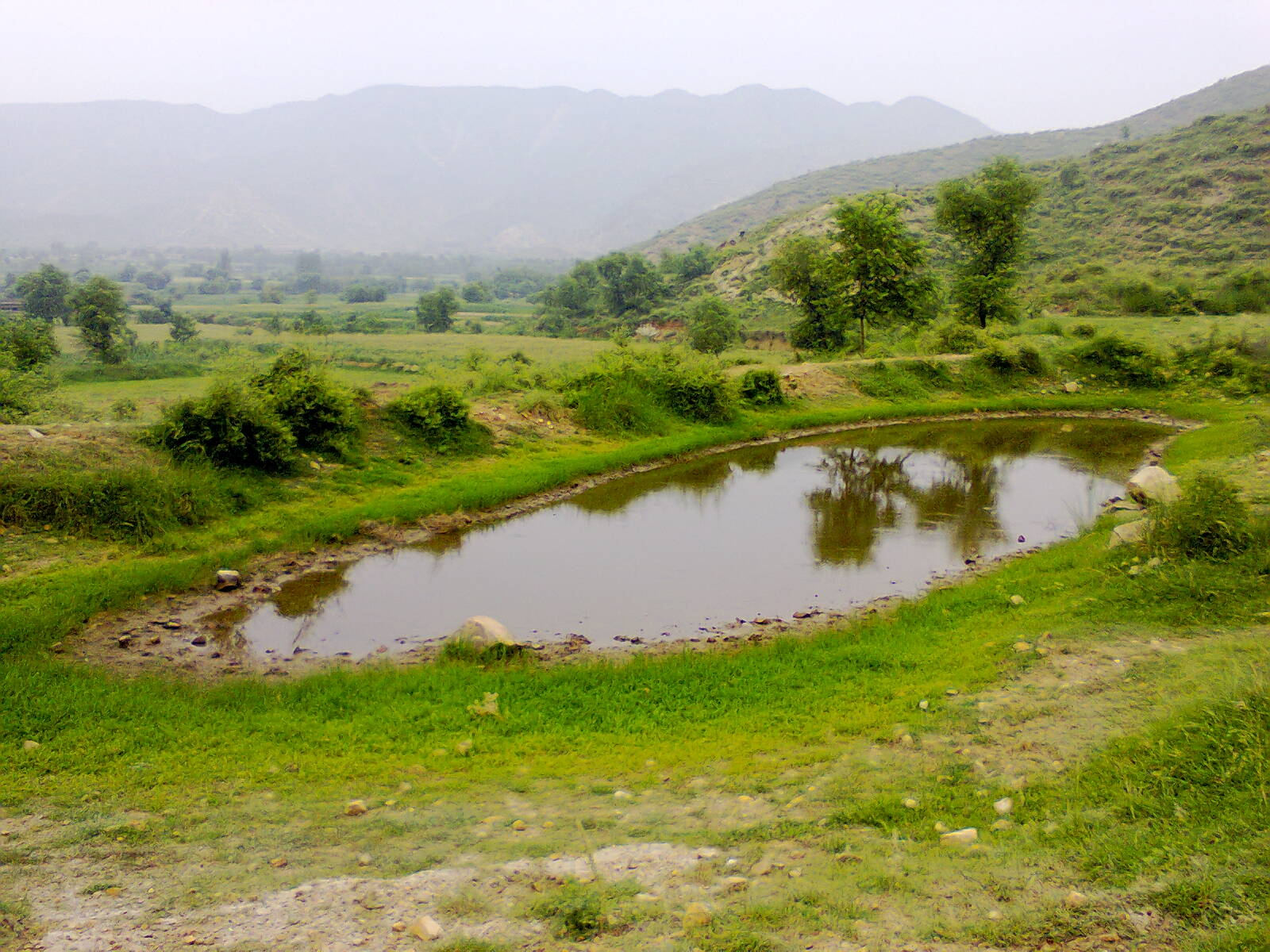
- Images, from top down, left to right: Fields and mountains in Swabi District; A sunset near Swabi; Swat Expressway at Mardan; Guides' Memorial in Mardan; A lake in Swabi District

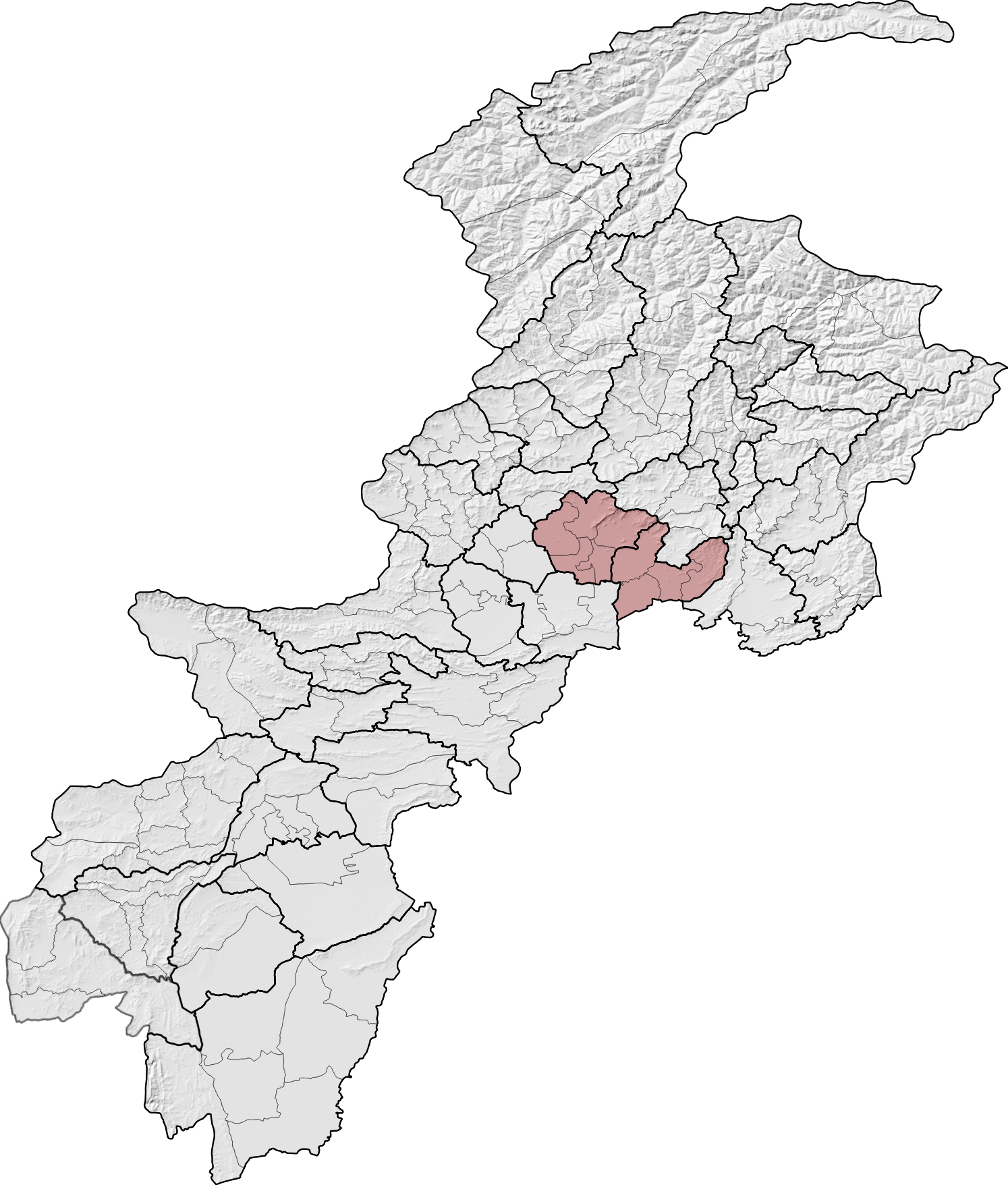
- Mardan Division (red) in Khyber Pakhtunkhwa
- Coordinates: 34°1′00″N 72°2′00″E
- Country: Pakistan
- Province: Khyber Pakhtunkhwa

Government
  - Type: Divisional Administration
  - Commissioner: Javaid Marwat
  - Regional Police Officer: N/A

Area
  - Division: 3,175 km^{2} (1,226 sq mi)

Population (2023 Pakistani Census)
  - Division: 4,639,498
  - Density: 1,461/km^{2} (3,785/sq mi)
  - Urban: 793,012 (17.09%)
  - Rural: 3,846,486 (82.91%)

Native Speakers
  - Speakers: Largest: Pashto (98.31%); Others: Hindko (0.89%)

Literacy
  - Literacy rate: Total: (56.90%); Male: (69.96%); Female: (43.43%)
- Time zone: UTC+5 (PST)
- National Assembly Seats (2024): Total (5): PTI (5)
- Khyber Pakhtunkhwa Assembly Seats (2024): Total (13): PTI (13)
- Website: commissionermardan.kp.gov.pk

Mardan Division is one of the seven divisions in the Khyber Pakhtunkhwa province of Pakistan. It consists of two districts: Mardan and Swabi. The division borders Hazara Division, Malakand Division, and Peshawar Division. CNIC code of Mardan Division is 16.

== List of the Districts ==
Districts are the administrative unit one level below divisions in the administrative hierarchy of Pakistan. Mardan Division consists of the following two districts: Mardan and Swabi.

#	District	Headquarter	Area (km²)	Pop. (2023)	Density (ppl/km²) (2023)	Lit. rate (2023)
1	Swabi	Swabi	1,543	1,894,600	1,228.0	58.48%
2	Mardan	Mardan	1,632	2,744,898	1,681.4	55.79%

== List of the Tehsils ==
#	Tehsil	Area (km²)	Pop. (2023)	Density (ppl/km²) (2023)	Lit. rate (2023)	Districts
1	Garhi Kapura Tehsil	143	319,465	2,234.02	51.70%	Mardan District
2	Katlang Tehsil	422	377,535	894.63	61.47%	Mardan District
3	Mardan Tehsil	335	1,040,893	3,107.14	56.41%	Mardan District
4	Rustam Tehsil	379	279,527	737.54	49.98%	Mardan District
5	Takht Bhai Tehsil	353	727,478	2,060.84	56.02%	Mardan District
6	Lahor Tehsil	318	354,383	1,114.41	54.16%	Swabi District
7	Razar Tehsil	418	682,303	1,632.30	56.61%	Swabi District
8	Swabi Tehsil	389	475,352	1,221.98	63.23%	Swabi District
9	Topi Tehsil	418	382,562	915.22	59.83%	Swabi District

== History ==
The area which covers Mardan Division today was carved out of the Peshawar District between the 1931 and 1941 censuses of the British India. The newly demarcated area was a Trans-Indus district designated as the Mardan District. The district comprised two tehsils initially, Mardan Tehsil and Swabi Tehsil, which later evolved to become two districts that forms today's Mardan Division.

This setup continued until One Unit, a geopolitical policy that abolished the provinces making up West Pakistan and consolidated West Pakistan into one province. Following the conclusion of the One Unit policy ended in 1970 and the subsequent reinstatement of the original provincial structure, the divisions that emerged during the policy period remained in the North-West Frontier Province. Thus, the Mardan District was situated within the Peshawar Division.

The area received full-fledged division status between the Pakistani censuses of 1981 and 1998, and during the same time period, Swabi Tehsil was also upgraded, to district status (becoming Swabi District).

In August 2000, the division was abolished along with every other division in the country, but was reinstated (with all the other divisions of Pakistan) eight years later after the elections of 2008.

== Geography ==
Mardan Division has a total area of 3,175 km^{2} (1,226 sq mi). The area of the division is split rather evenly across both districts, with Mardan District taking up 51.4% of the area of the division (1,632 km^{2} (630 sq mi)), and Swabi District takes up the remaining 1,543 km^{2} (596 sq mi).

The division borders the important Indus River to its south and east, and has an abundance of natural beauty.

=== Surrounding areas ===
To Mardan Division's north and northwest, you will find Malakand Division, to the division's west and southwest, Peshawar Division can be found. To the southeast of Mardan Division, Rawalpindi Division in the province of Punjab can be found, and Mardan Division borders the Hazara Division to its east.

== Demographics ==
Historical Population
Year	Pop.	±% p.a.
1941	544,226	—
1951	629,374	+1.46%
1961	813,840	+2.60%
1972	1,204,253	+3.63%
1981	1,506,500	+2.52%
1998	2,486,904	+2.99%
2017	3,997,667	+2.53%
2023	4,639,498	+2.51%

As of the 2023 Census of Pakistan, the division had a population of 4,639,498 roughly equal to the country of Ireland or the US state of Louisiana or Chinese province of Jilin.

The largest city in Mardan Division is its namesake, Mardan. Mardan had a population of 358,604 in 2017 and was the second-largest city in the entire province (after Peshawar) at the time. Swabi was the second-largest city in the division, and it had a population of 123,412 and was the eighth-largest city in the province. The next three most-populous cities in the division were Takht-i-Bahi, in the Mardan District, with a population of 80,721, Topi, in the Swabi District, with a population of 52,983, and Tordher, also in the Swabi District, with a population of 41,420. The whole division had seven municipalities in 2017, with five of them being concentrated in the Swabi District.

The division has one cantonment, the Mardan Cantonment, adjacent to the city of Mardan which had a population of 6,871, making up the division's entire military population. This made only 0.17% of the entire population of the division active military personnel (one of the smallest military-civilian ratios in all of Pakistan).

In 2014 - 2015, Mardan Division had a literacy rate of roughly 51%, below the national average of 60%, and just below the provincial average of 53%.

Religious groups in Mardan Division (British North-West Frontier Province era)
Religious group	1911		1921		1931		1941	
Religious group	Pop.	%	Pop.	%	Pop.	%	Pop.	%
Islam	293,695	95.65%	316,842	95.76%	341,109	95.56%	483,575	95.47%
Hinduism	7,344	2.39%	9,909	2.99%	7,367	2.06%	10,677	2.11%
Sikhism	5,889	1.92%	3,936	1.19%	8,204	2.3%	11,838	2.34%
Christianity	126	0.04%	197	0.06%	292	0.08%	449	0.09%
Jainism	1	0%	0	0%	0	0%	0	0%
Zoroastrianism	1	0%	0	0%	0	0%	0	0%
Buddhism	0	0%	0	0%	0	0%	0	0%
Judaism	0	0%	0	0%	0	0%	0	0%
Others	0	0%	0	0%	0	0%	0	0%
Total population	307,056	100%	330,884	100%	356,972	100%	506,539	100%
Note: British North-West Frontier Province era figures are for Mardan District, which roughly corresponds to present-day Mardan Division.

== Climate ==
The climate of Mardan Division varies depending on where you are in the division. In the western part of the division, towards Mardan District and the city of Mardan, the summers are hot, the winters are mild and dry, and little rainfall falls through the year. Here the climate is classified as a BSh (or a hot semi-arid climate) by the Köppen climate classification. In the eastern part of the division, towards Swabi District and the city of Swabi, the summers are hot and long but the winters are dry and cool. Here the climate is classified as a Cwa (or a humid subtropical climate) by the Köppen classification.

Climate data for Mardan
Month	Jan	Feb	Mar	Apr	May	Jun	Jul	Aug	Sep	Oct	Nov	Dec	Year
Mean daily maximum °C (°F)	17.7 (63.9)	19.0 (66.2)	24.0 (75.2)	30.1 (86.2)	36.3 (97.3)	41.4 (106.5)	38.5 (101.3)	36.5 (97.7)	35.3 (95.5)	31.6 (88.9)	25.1 (77.2)	19.4 (66.9)	29.6 (85.2)
Daily mean °C (°F)	10.0 (50.0)	12.2 (54.0)	17.2 (63.0)	22.7 (72.9)	28.2 (82.8)	33.2 (91.8)	32.3 (90.1)	31.0 (87.8)	28.8 (83.8)	23.2 (73.8)	16.2 (61.2)	11.0 (51.8)	22.2 (71.9)
Mean daily minimum °C (°F)	2.3 (36.1)	5.5 (41.9)	10.4 (50.7)	15.3 (59.5)	20.2 (68.4)	25.1 (77.2)	26.2 (79.2)	25.5 (77.9)	22.3 (72.1)	14.9 (58.8)	7.4 (45.3)	2.7 (36.9)	14.8 (58.7)
Average rainfall mm (inches)	47 (1.9)	53 (2.1)	67 (2.6)	44 (1.7)	20 (0.8)	17 (0.7)	88 (3.5)	122 (4.8)	45 (1.8)	12 (0.5)	14 (0.6)	30 (1.2)	559 (22.2)
Source: Climate-Data.org

Climate data for Swabi
Month	Jan	Feb	Mar	Apr	May	Jun	Jul	Aug	Sep	Oct	Nov	Dec	Year
Mean daily maximum °C (°F)	17.7 (63.9)	19.4 (66.9)	24.4 (75.9)	30.1 (86.2)	36.1 (97.0)	41.0 (105.8)	38.0 (100.4)	36.0 (96.8)	35.0 (95.0)	31.7 (89.1)	25.5 (77.9)	19.7 (67.5)	29.6 (85.2)
Daily mean °C (°F)	10.2 (50.4)	12.7 (54.9)	17.5 (63.5)	22.7 (72.9)	28.0 (82.4)	32.9 (91.2)	31.8 (89.2)	30.4 (86.7)	28.4 (83.1)	23.4 (74.1)	16.9 (62.4)	11.7 (53.1)	22.2 (72.0)
Mean daily minimum °C (°F)	2.8 (37.0)	6.0 (42.8)	10.6 (51.1)	15.3 (59.5)	20.0 (68.0)	24.9 (76.8)	25.7 (78.3)	24.8 (76.6)	21.9 (71.4)	15.1 (59.2)	8.3 (46.9)	3.8 (38.8)	14.9 (58.9)
Average rainfall mm (inches)	55 (2.2)	58 (2.3)	69 (2.7)	47 (1.9)	23 (0.9)	25 (1.0)	110 (4.3)	137 (5.4)	58 (2.3)	14 (0.6)	12 (0.5)	31 (1.2)	639 (25.3)
Source: Climate-Data.org

== Constituencies ==
Provincial Assembly Constituency	National Assembly Constituency	District
PK-49 Swabi-I	NA-19 Swabi-I	Swabi
PK-50 Swabi-II	NA-19 Swabi-I	Swabi
PK-51 Swabi-III	NA-19 Swabi-I	Swabi
PK-52 Swabi-IV	NA-20 Swabi-II	Swabi
PK-53 Swabi-V	NA-20 Swabi-II	Swabi
PK-54 Mardan-I	NA-21 Mardan-I	Mardan
PK-55 Mardan-II	NA-21 Mardan-I	Mardan
PK-56 Mardan-III	NA-22 Mardan-II	Mardan
PK-57 Mardan-IV	NA-22 Mardan-II	Mardan
PK-58 Mardan-V	NA-22 Mardan-II	Mardan
PK-59 Mardan-VI	NA-23 Mardan-III	Mardan
PK-60 Mardan-VII	NA-23 Mardan-III	Mardan
PK-61 Mardan-VIII	NA-23 Mardan-III	Mardan

== See also ==
- Divisions of Pakistan
- Divisions of Khyber Pakhtunkhwa
  - Bannu Division
  - Dera Ismail Khan Division
  - Hazara Division
  - Kohat Division
  - Malakand Division
  - Peshawar Division
- Mardan District
  - Mardan
- Swabi District
  - Swabi
- Administrative units of Pakistan
- Districts of Khyber Pakhtunkhwa
