= Dheri Likpani =

- Village and union council
- Country: Pakistan
- Region: Khyber Pakhtunkhwa
- District: Mardan District
- Time zone: UTC+5 (PST)

Dheri Likpani is a union council in Tehsil Katlang . Mardan District of Khyber Pakhtunkhwa.

The Dheri Likpani consist of four village council;

1) Dheri

2) Likapni

3) Charchor

4) maira
