= Katti Garhi =

Coordinates: 34°21′N 72°00′E

- Village and union council
- Interactive map of Katti Garhi
- Country: Pakistan
- Region: Khyber Pakhtunkhwa
- District: Mardan District
- Time zone: UTC+5 (PST)

Katti Garhi is a village and union council in Mardan District of Khyber Pakhtunkhwa.
