= Sikandary =

- Village and union council
- Country: Pakistan
- Region: Khyber Pakhtunkhwa
- District: Mardan District
- Time zone: UTC+5 (PST)

Sikandary is a village and union council in Mardan District of Khyber Pakhtunkhwa.
