= Seri Bahlol, Mardan =

Seri Bahlol
- Village and union council
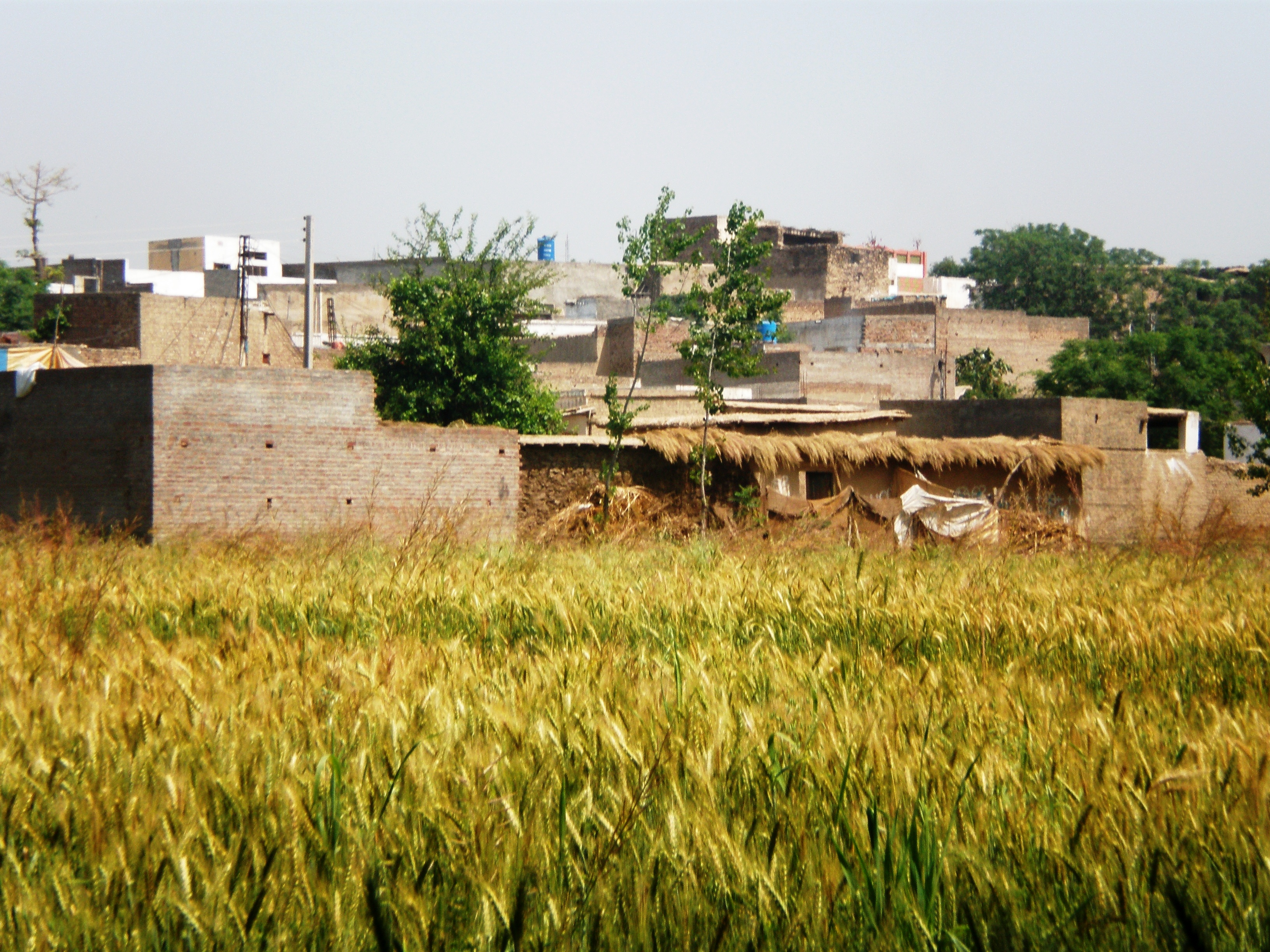
- Seri-Bahlol Showing village view and agriculture land
- Interactive map of Seri Bahlol
- Country: Pakistan
- Region: Khyber Pakhtunkhwa
- District: Mardan District
- Time zone: UTC+5 (PST)

Seri Bahlol is a village and union council in Mardan District of Khyber Pakhtunkhwa.
