= Madi Baba =

Village in Khyber Pakhtunkhwa, Pakistan

Madey Baba
- Village and union council
- Country: Pakistan
- Region: Khyber Pakhtunkhwa
- District: Mardan District
- Time zone: UTC+5 (PST)

Madey Baba is a village and union council in the Takht Bhai Tehsil of Mardan District of the Pakistani province Khyber Pakhtunkhwa.
