= Daman-e-Koh, Mardan =

Daman-e-Koh
- Village and union council
- Country: Pakistan
- Region: Khyber Pakhtunkhwa
- District: Mardan District
- Time zone: UTC+5 (PST)

Daman-e-Koh is a village and union council in Mardan District of Khyber Pakhtunkhwa.
