= Khazana Dheri =

- Village and union council
- Location in Pakistan
- Coordinates: 34°10′16″N 71°56′49″E
- Country: Pakistan
- Region: Khyber Pakhtunkhwa
- District: Mardan District
- Time zone: UTC+5 (PST)

Khazana Dheri is a village and union council in Mardan District of Khyber Pakhtunkhwa.
