= Gumbat, Mardan =

Gumbat گمبت
- Village and union council
- Country: Pakistan
- Region: Khyber Pakhtunkhwa
- District: Mardan District

Population
  - Total: 22,547 (excluding Giddar - having population of 3,442 - as per according to the recent census)
- Time zone: UTC+5 (PST)
- Postal code: 23311

Gumbat is a village and union council in Mardan District of Khyber Pakhtunkhwa.
