= Sawal Dher =

Ancient village in Mardan, Pakistan

Coordinates: 34.309173°N 72.102349°E

Sawal Dher (Urdu: ساولڈھیر) is a historic village in Mardan District of Khyber Pakhtunkhwa province of Pakistan. The village contains the remains of an ancient city dating back to the Gandhara region of the Buddhist period. The village is located 10 kilometers southwest of Katlang-Jamal Ghari. Most of the relics of this site are now in a museum. This site is situated at a distance of around 5 kilometres (3.1 mi) in the southwest of Jamal Garhi. Most of the sculptures of this monastery are preserved in the Peshawar and Lahore Museums. It is 19 kilometres (12 mi) away from the district capital Mardan. Another archaeological site located near this village is Thareli (also spelt Tarelli or Tarali), which contains remains from the Buddhist era, including stupas and monasteries.

The population of Sawaldher, according to the 1998 census, is about 40,000. The following Pakhtun tribes live in Sawal Dher: Khattak, Yousafzai, Miangaan, Gujeraan, Chamyaraan, Roghani, Baghwanan Kolalaan, Qasabaan, and Awankhel. Main occupations are farming, business, and employment. A small and low-level woodcutting industry exists in the village. The linked villages (also part of Sawal Dher), Guli Bagh, and Musa Khatt are situated 3 kilometres northeast and are famous for their gardening and plantation sales outlets.

== History ==
Sawal Dher is a region with ancient history in the Indian subcontinent. A grand mosque and Hujra were constructed by the forefathers of the village long before on a high plot of land. It is a very spacious Grand Masque named Masjid-e-Bala and a traditional gathering place(Hujra)named Bara Hujra. It is said that this place is 5,000 years old and relates to the Buddha era. Moreover, it is believed and reported that this Grand Mosque of the village was constructed on the ruins of a Buddhist Stupa. Sawal Dher was built and developed by three main families, i.e., Roghani, Khattak, and Awan, who come from various parts of Pakhtun Land and settled here. After some time, people of nearby Katlang, a big town in the area, tried to kick out the people of Sawal Dher, but the brave people became united against those invaders and ousted them. Later on, the people of the village Sawal Dher also won a lawsuit in the British Raj Courts against the establishment of the village. Settlement of the irrigated land was done during the British Raj. People in the village live on the principles of harmony, equality, and brotherhood. Sawal Dher has a unique status in Pakhtun Land. Few families have a higher amount of land than average, including Wazir Dad, known as a barbarian. In 1840, he fought against the British Raj.
