= Mardan Cantonment =

Coordinates: 34°12′14.5″N 72°02′16.2″E

- Cantonment
- Interactive map of Mardan Cantonment
- Country: Pakistan
- Province: Khyber Pakhtunkhwa
- District: Mardan
- Tehsil: Mardan

Population (2017)
  - Total: 6,871
- Time zone: UTC+5 (PST)
- Calling code: +92 937

Mardan Cantonment is located in Mardan, the second largest city of Khyber Pakhtunkhwa, and is the only cantonment in Mardan District and Mardan Division. It is the centre of one of the most renowned regiment of Pakistan Army - The Punjab Regiment. The cantonment has a large area for training and offices. Mardan once served as a base for British troops, who never managed to fully control the region's Pashtun tribes. Now it is home to the Pakistan Air Force Academy, at the Risalpur air base; and the Pakistan Army's School of Artillery and School of Armor and Mechanized Warfare.

== Overview and history ==
Historical population
Year	Pop.	±%
1951	2,505	—
1961	4,686	+87.1%
1972	3,828	−18.3%
1981	6,135	+60.3%
1998	7,297	+18.9%
2017	6,871	−5.8%

Mardan sits on a plain, surrounded on three sides in 2009 by mountains controlled by the Islamist militants. Swat lies just 30 miles to the north, with the main road to that troubled valley running straight through town. Mardan has the feel of a backwater. On the edge of town is rusting ghost of the sugar mill that once powered the local economy. Billboards depict glitzy shopping malls never built.

Mardan has an important historical and geographical position. A region communicating Afghanistan and India in the past, it had witnessed a wonderful history. Alexander the Great reached the valley through Kunar Afghanistan and Swat in 326 BC.This was followed by Buddhism until the 7th century AD. Towards the end of 7th century; the Dilazak Afghans arrived in the region. They introduced Islam in the valley. Following this Sultan Sabuktagin, Mahmood Ghaznavi, Mohammad Ghori, Mughals until the time of Aurangzeb and Nadir Shah ruled the valley. Then came the Sikhs and finally British Raj until 1947.

As of 1903 Mardan Cantonment in Peshawar District, North-West Frontier Province, was the permanent headquarters of the Queen's Own Corps of Guides. It is also the headquarters of the Mardan tehsil and the Yusufzai subdivision. Population (1901), 3,572. The cantonment is situated in 34°12'N. and 72°2'E., on the right bank of the Kalpani river, 33 miles north-east of Peshawar and 15 miles north of Nau- shahra, on the North-Western Railway. The fort was built by Hodson of the Guides in 1854. The civil lines lay in the southern part of the cantonment on the Naushahra road, and contained the Assistant Commissioner's bungalow, courthouse, tahslll, Government dispensary, and other public offices. An Anglo-vernacular middle school was maintained by the District board. The village of Hoti, from which the station is sometimes called Hoti Mardan, lies 2 miles from the cantonment.

Sheikh Malee was a great Pashtoon Geographer. He lived about 500 years ago and was one of the reliable friends of Sardar Malak Ahmad, a famous Yousafzai leader. In those days Mardan, Buner, Swat and other Pashtoon areas were collectively known as Swat. He was a sincere and an honest man. But he is famous because of the land allocation programme called "Veish" which he introduced in Peshawar, Mardan, Buner, Swat and other areas. He introduced the Unit of the land. He classified Pashtoons into nine major subgroups and the region into nine districts. He wrote a book in nine volumes about his land reforms. This is called 'Daftar e Sheikh Malee' and has been mentioned in the poems of the great poet, Khushal Khan Khattak.

The 5th (Guides) Battalion of the 12th Frontier Force Regiment had Mardan as its normal duty station. In 1857, the Guides formed part of the force that went from the Punjab to the aid of the British locked in a critical combat with Indian soldiers. When the news of the outbreak reached Peshawar, a council of war was held and measures adopted to meet the situation. The same night the Guides started on their memorable march to Delhi. On 21 May 1857 the 55th Native Infantry rose at Mardan. The majority made good their escape across the Indus, only to perish after fearful privations at the hands of the hill-men of the Hazara border. Delhi fell to the British on 20 September 1857 after a siege lasting five months. The victorious soldiers fell upon the city and freely indulged in looting and massacre.

The Guides Memorial in Mardan was built by the British in 1892 in memory of their soldiers who sacrificed their lives in defence of Queen's Residency in Kabul on September 23, 1879. This historical memorial was built in the centre of Mardan city. It has three storey building. There is an opening arch in the center of this memorial while on both sides are staircases. There is an influence of Hindu temple architecture on the ground structures, featuring suspended leaves in well-carved stone works, with marble stones and mouldings that not only support the building but also secure it from earthquake shockwaves. The Gothic arches are British architecture like those seen in Churches. On the second floor there are open arches from which a major part of the surroundings is visible. On the third stage there are cupolas on each corner of this memorial.

== See also ==
- Mardan
- Mardan District
