= NA-22 Mardan-II =

Constituency of the National Assembly of Pakistan

- Constituency for the National Assembly of Pakistan
- Region: Garhi Kapoora Tehsil and Mardan Tehsil (partly), including Mardan city and Cantonment area, of Mardan District
- Electorate: 419,713

Current constituency
- Party: Sunni Ittehad Council
- Member: Atif Khan
- Created from: NA-21 (Mardan-II)

NA-22 Mardan-II (این اے-22 مردان-۲) is a constituency for the National Assembly of Pakistan. The constituency was formerly known as NA-9 (Mardan-I) from 1977 to 2018. The name changed to NA-21 (Mardan-II) after the delimitation in 2018 and to NA-22 (Mardan-II) after the delimitation in 2022.

== Members of Parliament ==
=== 1977–2002: NA-9 Mardan-I ===
| Election | Member | Party |
|---|---|---|
| 1977 | Ali Gohar Khan | PNA |
| 1985 | Yaqub Khan Jadoon | Independent |
| 1988 | Maulvi Niamatullah | IJI |
| 1990 | Syed Iftikhar Hussain Gillani | PDA |
| 1993 | Syed Iftikhar Hussain Gillani | PML-N |
| 1997 | Javed Ibrahim Paracha | PML-N |

=== 2002–2018: NA-9 Mardan-I ===
| Election | Member | Party |
|---|---|---|
| 2002 | Shuja ul Mulk | MMA |
| 2008 | Himayat Ullah Mayar | ANP |
| 2013 | Amir Haider Khan | ANP |

=== 2018–2022: NA-21 Mardan-II ===
| Election | Member | Party |
|---|---|---|
| 2018 | Haider Khan Hoti | ANP |

=== 2023–present: NA-22 Mardan-II ===
| Election | Member | Party |
|---|---|---|
| 2024 | Atif Khan | SIC |

== Elections since 2002 ==
=== 2002 general election ===
2002 General Election: NA-9 (Mardan-I)
| Party | Candidate | Votes | % | ±% |
|---|---|---|---|---|
| MMA | Shajaul Mulk | 54,479 | 70.14 | |
| Independent | Abbas Sarfaraz Khan | 15,376 | 19.80 | |
| PPPP | Murad Khan | 5,077 | 6.54 | |
| Independent | Sarfaraz Khan | 1,417 | 1.82 | |
| PTI | Yousaf Shah | 1,049 | 1.35 | |
| Independent | Iqbal Khan | 270 | 0.35 | |
| Majority | | 39,103 | 50.34 | |
| Turnout | | 77,668 | 35.90 | |
| MMA gain from PML-N | | | | |

A total of 1,722 votes were rejected.

=== 2008 general election ===
2008 General Election: NA-9 (Mardan-I)
| Party | Candidate | Votes | % | ±% |
|---|---|---|---|---|
| ANP | Himayat Ullah Mayar | 30,770 | 53.93 | |
| Jamiat Ulama-e-Islam Nazryati | Moulana Shuja ul Mulk | 24,621 | 43.16 | |
| Independent | Muhammad Sarfraz Khan | 519 | 0.91 | |
| Independent | Syed Umer alias Member | 373 | 0.65 | |
| Independent | Zulqurnain | 282 | 0.49 | |
| Independent | Muhammad Nawab alias Chona | 193 | 0.34 | |
| Independent | Yasir Ali | 111 | 0.20 | |
| Independent | Abid Khan | 93 | 0.16 | |
| Independent | Asia Naz Awan | 92 | 0.16 | |
| Majority | | 6,149 | 10.77 | |
| Turnout | | 57,054 | 30.80 | −5.10 |
| ANP gain from MMA | | | | |

A total of 1,063 votes were rejected.

=== 2013 general election ===
2013 General Election: NA-9 (Mardan-I)
| Party | Candidate | Votes | % | ±% |
|---|---|---|---|---|
| ANP | Amir Haider Khan | 44,769 | 30.17 | −23.76 |
| PTI | Nasir Khan | 42,068 | 28.35 | |
| PML-N | Nawabzada Khawaja Muhammad Khan Hoti | 32,090 | 21.63 | |
| JUI-F | Shuja ul Mulk | 14,427 | 9.72 | |
| PPPP | Shazia Aurangzeb Khan | 7,002 | 4.72 | |
| JI | Atta ur Rehman | 4,578 | 3.08 | |
| TTP | Muhammad Irfan ud Din | 1,493 | 1.01 | |
| Independent | Didar Shah | 1,211 | 0.82 | |
| MQM | Qayum Khan | 293 | 0.20 | |
| PML | Inam Khan | 290 | 0.19 | |
| Independent | Yousaf Shah | 87 | 0.06 | |
| Independent | Ma us Sama Aryani | 82 | 0.05 | |
| Majority | | 2,701 | 1.82 | |
| Turnout | | 148,390 | 45.12 | +14.32 |
| ANP hold | | Swing | | |

A total of 3,558 votes were rejected.

=== 2018 general election ===
General elections were held on 25 July 2018. This constituency had the lowest margin of victory (35 votes), in all of Pakistan, this election.

General election 2018: NA-21 (Mardan-II)
| Party | Candidate | Votes | % | ±% |
|---|---|---|---|---|
| ANP | Haider Khan Hoti | 78,911 | 40.97 | ▲10.80 |
| PTI | Atif Khan | 78,876 | 40.96 | ▲12.61 |
| Others | Others (four candidates) | 29,010 | 15.06 | |
| Turnout | | 192,587 | 45.89 | ▲0.77 |
| Rejected ballots | | 5,790 | 3.00 | |
| Majority | | 35 | 0.01 | ▼1.81 |
| Registered electors | | 419,713 | | |
| ANP hold | | Swing | ▼0.90 | |

=== 2024 general election ===
General elections were held on 8 February 2024. Atif Khan won the election with 115,935 votes.

General election 2024: NA-22 Mardan-II
| Party | Candidate | Votes | % | ±% |
|---|---|---|---|---|
| PTI | Atif Khan (Note: Filed nomination papers as PTI candidate but ECP allowed him to run as an Independent) | 115,935 | 53.83 | ▲12.87 |
| ANP | Haider Khan Hoti | 66,952 | 31.09 | ▼9.88 |
| JUI (F) | Niaz Ali | 24,357 | 11.31 | N/A |
| Others | Others (fourteen candidates) | 8,127 | 3.77 | |
| Turnout | | 221,503 | 39.68 | ▼6.21 |
| Rejected ballots | | 6,132 | 2.77 | |
| Majority | | 48,983 | 22.74 | |
| Registered electors | | 558,225 | | |

== See also ==
- NA-21 Mardan-I
- NA-23 Mardan-III
