= Kata Khat =

Coordinates: 34°19′N 72°11′E

- Village and union council
- Interactive map of Kata Khat
- Country: Pakistan
- Region: Khyber Pakhtunkhwa
- District: Mardan District
- Time zone: UTC+5 (PST)

Kata Khat is a village and union council in Mardan District of Khyber Pakhtunkhwa.
