= Rustam Tehsil =

Pakistani administrative area

Rustam Tehsil تحصیل رستم رستم تحصیل
- Tehsil
- Country: Pakistan
- Province: Khyber Pakhtunkhwa
- District: Mardan
- Capital: Rustam
- Time zone: UTC+5 (PST)

Rustam Tehsil is a tehsil located in Mardan District, Khyber Pakhtunkhwa, Pakistan. The town of Rustam is the capital of the tehsil. According to the 2017 census the tehsil covering an area of 379sqkm had a population of 279,527 of which 140,896 were male and 138,629 female. The area is part of the PK-55 Mardan-II constituency for the Khyber Pakhtunkhwa Assembly.

== Demography ==
According to the 2023 census the religious affiliation of Rustam Tehsil was as follows: 278,915 Muslim, 578 Christian, 2 Ahmadi Muslim, 2 Sikhs and 10 were listed as others.

Religion	Population
Muslim	278,915
Christian	578
Ahmadi	2
Sikh	2
Others	10

The census also recorded the first language of the residents of the tehsil as follows, 102 Urdu, 55 Punjabi, 55 Sindhi, 277,471 Pushto, 225 Balochi, 1 Kashmiri, 1 Saraiki, 115 Hindko, 2 Kalasha, 32 Kohistani and 1,491 listed as others.

Language	Speakers
Urdu	102
Punjabi	55
Sindhi	55
Pushto	277,471
Balochi	225
Kashmiri	1
Saraiki	1
Hindko	115
Kalasha	2
Kohistani	32
Others	1,491
