= Takht Bhai Tehsil =

Takht Bhai Tehsil تحصیل تخت بھائی تخت بای تحصیل
- Tehsil
- Country: Pakistan
- Region: Khyber Pakhtunkhwa
- District: Mardan

Government
  - Chairman: Muhammad Saeed (JUI(F))

Population (2017)
  - Tehsil: 626,523
  - Urban: 80,721
  - Rural: 545,802
- Time zone: UTC+5 (PST)
  - Summer (DST): UTC+6 (PDT)

Takht Bhai is a tehsil located in Mardan District, Khyber Pakhtunkhwa, Pakistan. The population is 626,523 according to the 2017 census.

== See also ==
- List of tehsils of Khyber Pakhtunkhwa
