= Jamal Garhi =

Town in Khyber Pakhtunkhwa, Pakistan

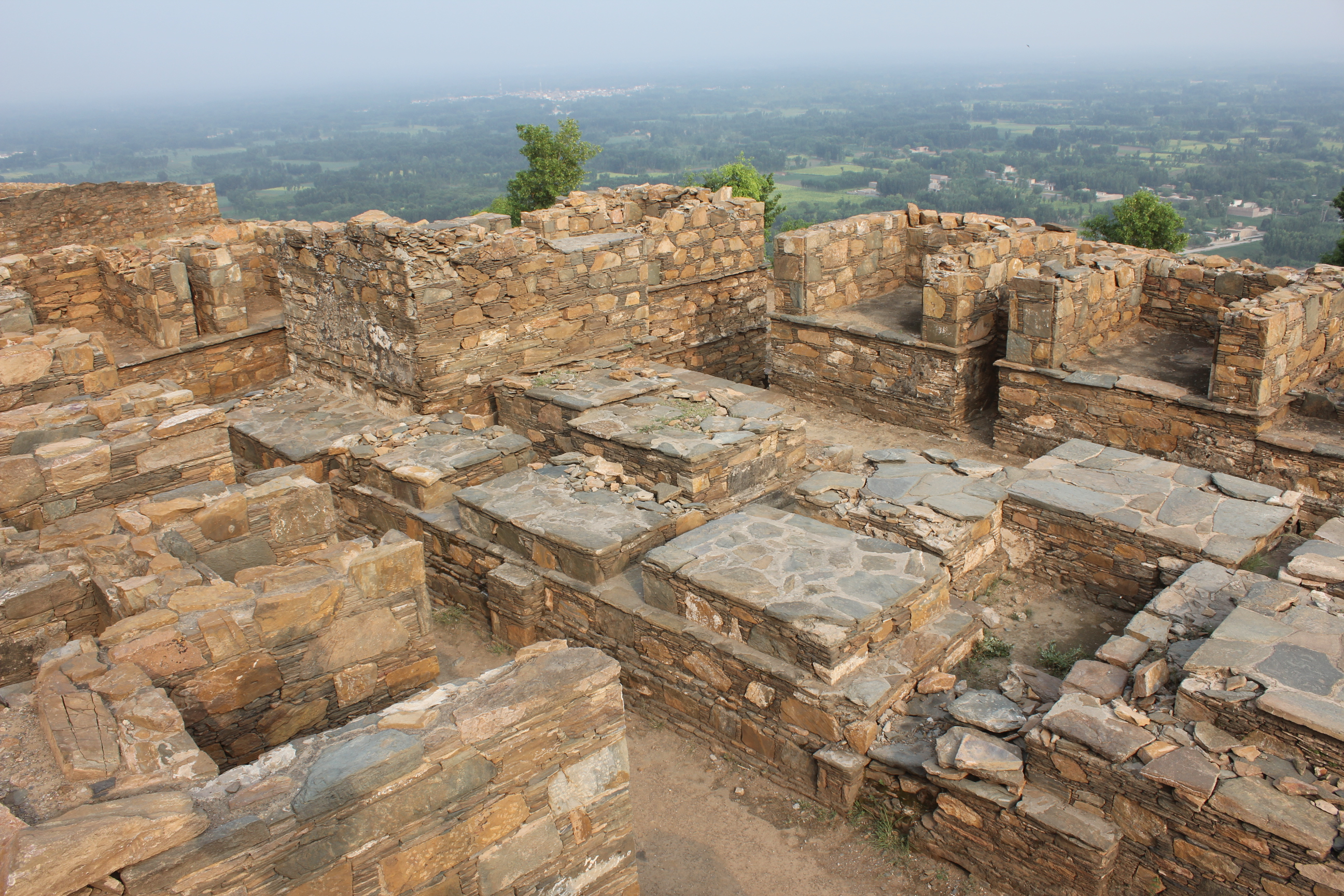
- View of Jamal Garhi ruins from the Graeco-Buddhist era.

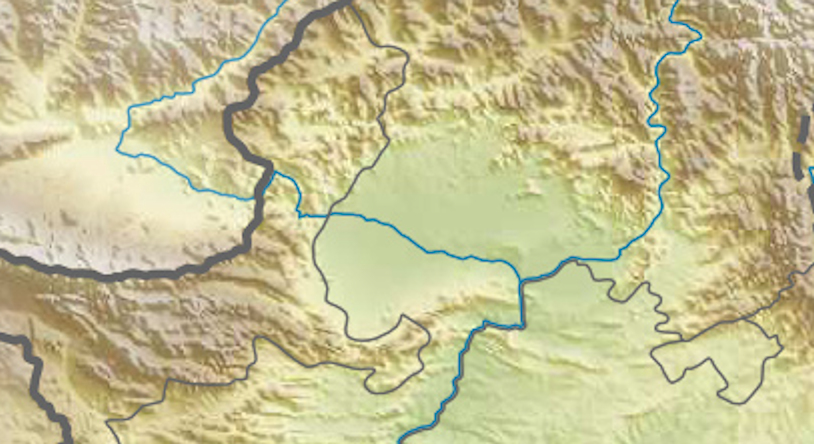
- Location within Pakistan Location within Gandhara
- 34°19′N 72°04′E
- Type: Settlement
- Location: Khyber Pakhtunkhwa, Pakistan

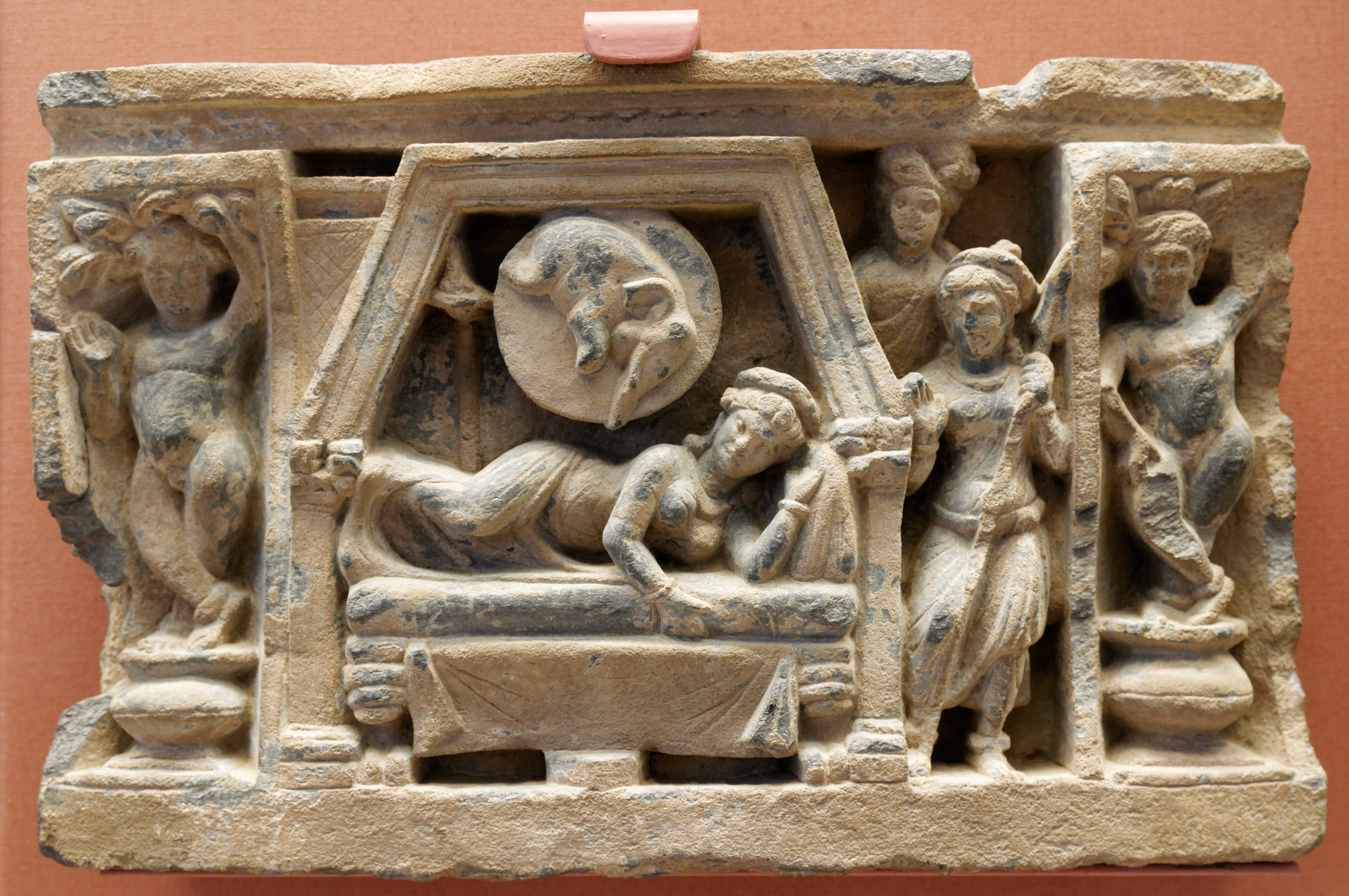
Stupa drum panel showing the conception of the Buddha: Queen Maya dreams of a white elephant entering her right side, 100–300 AD, carved schist, Jamal Garhi, British Museum.

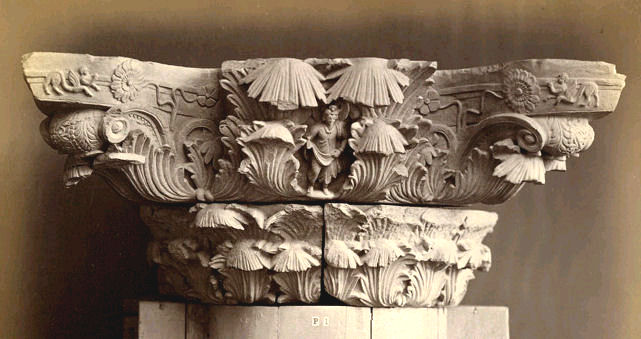
Indo-Corinthian capital from Jamal Garhi

Jamal Garhi is a small town located 13 kilometers from Mardan at Katlang-Mardan road in Khyber Pakhtunkhwa province in northern Pakistan. Jamal Garhi was a Buddhist monastery from the first until the fifth century AD at a time when Buddhism flourished in present-day Khyber Pakhtunkhwa, Pakistan. The monastery and main stupa are surrounded by chapels closely packed together. The site is called "The Jamal Garhi Kandarat or Kafiro Kote" by the locals.

== Discovery ==
The ruins of Jamal Garhi were first discovered by the British explorer and archaeologist Sir Alexander Cunningham in 1848. The stupa at the site was opened by Colonel Lumsden in 1852 but little of value was found at the time. In 1871, the site was excavated by Lieutenant Cromten, who unearthed a large number of Buddhist sculptures which are now part of the collections of the British Museum and the Indian Museum in Calcutta. At the monastery a Kharoshti inscription was also discovered which is now kept in Peshawar Museum.

== Ruins ==
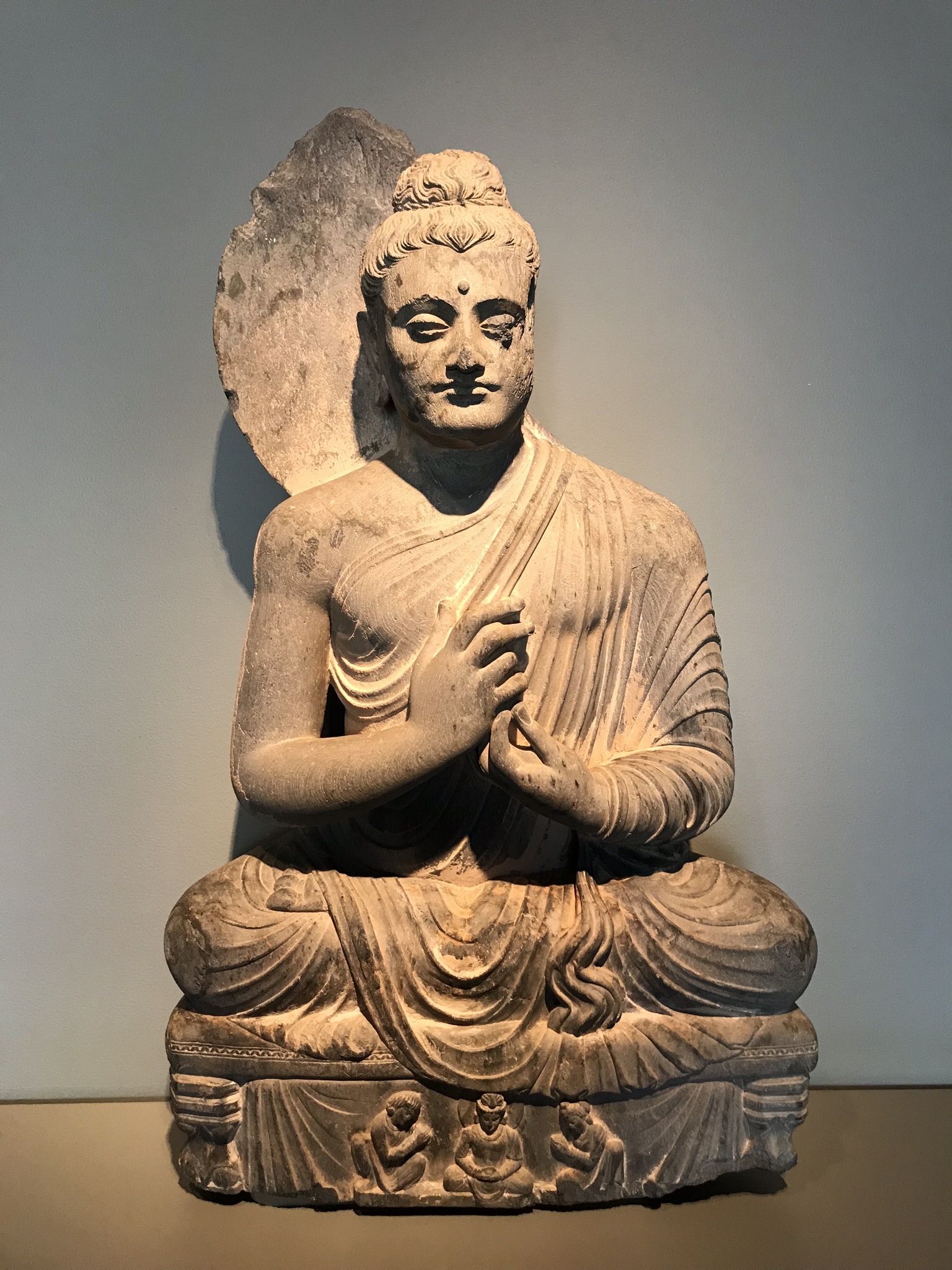
The Seated Buddha, dating from 300 to 500 CE, was found near Jamal Garhi, and is now on display at the Asian Art Museum in San Francisco

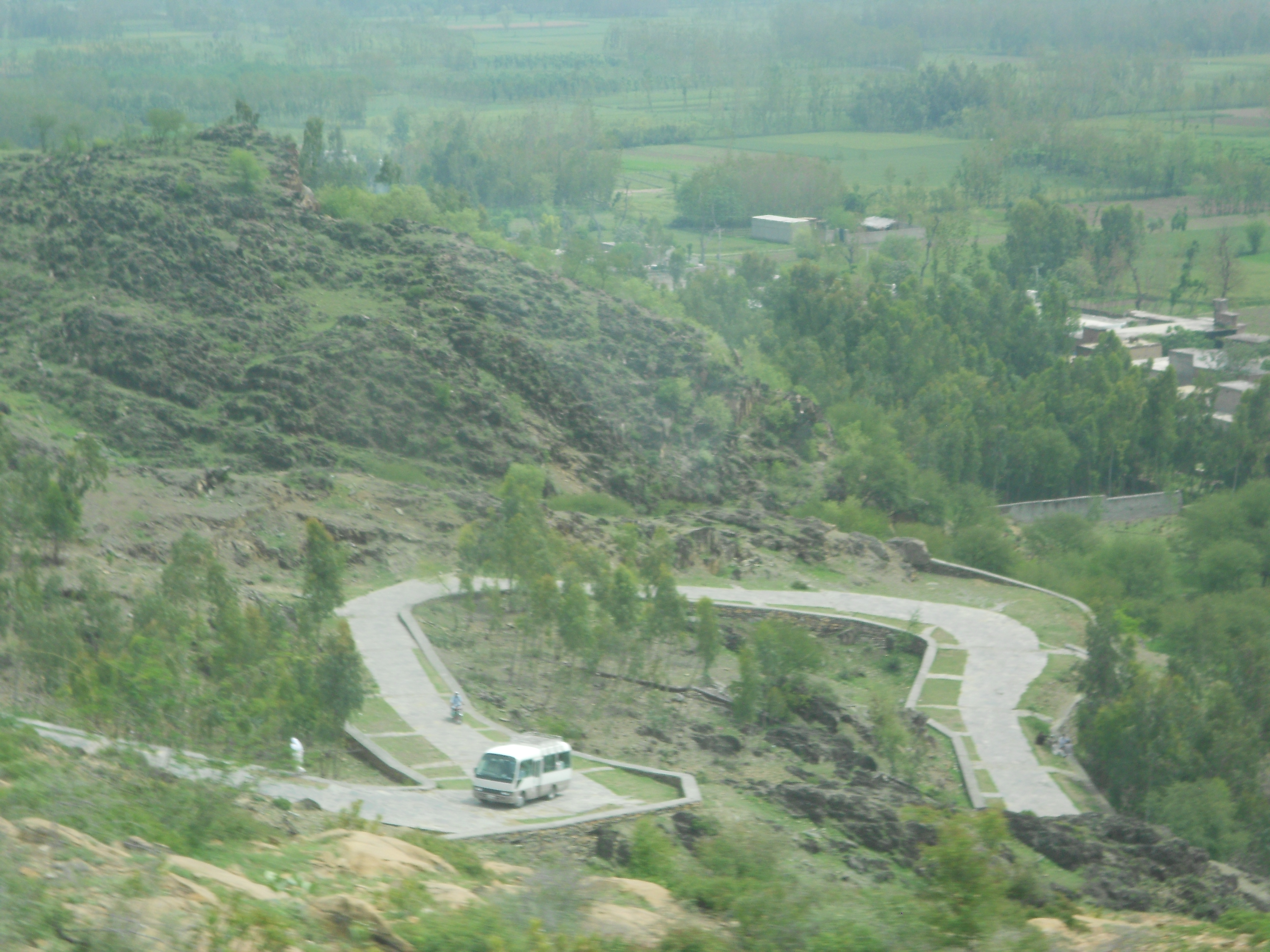
Road to Buddhist remains at Jamal Garhi.

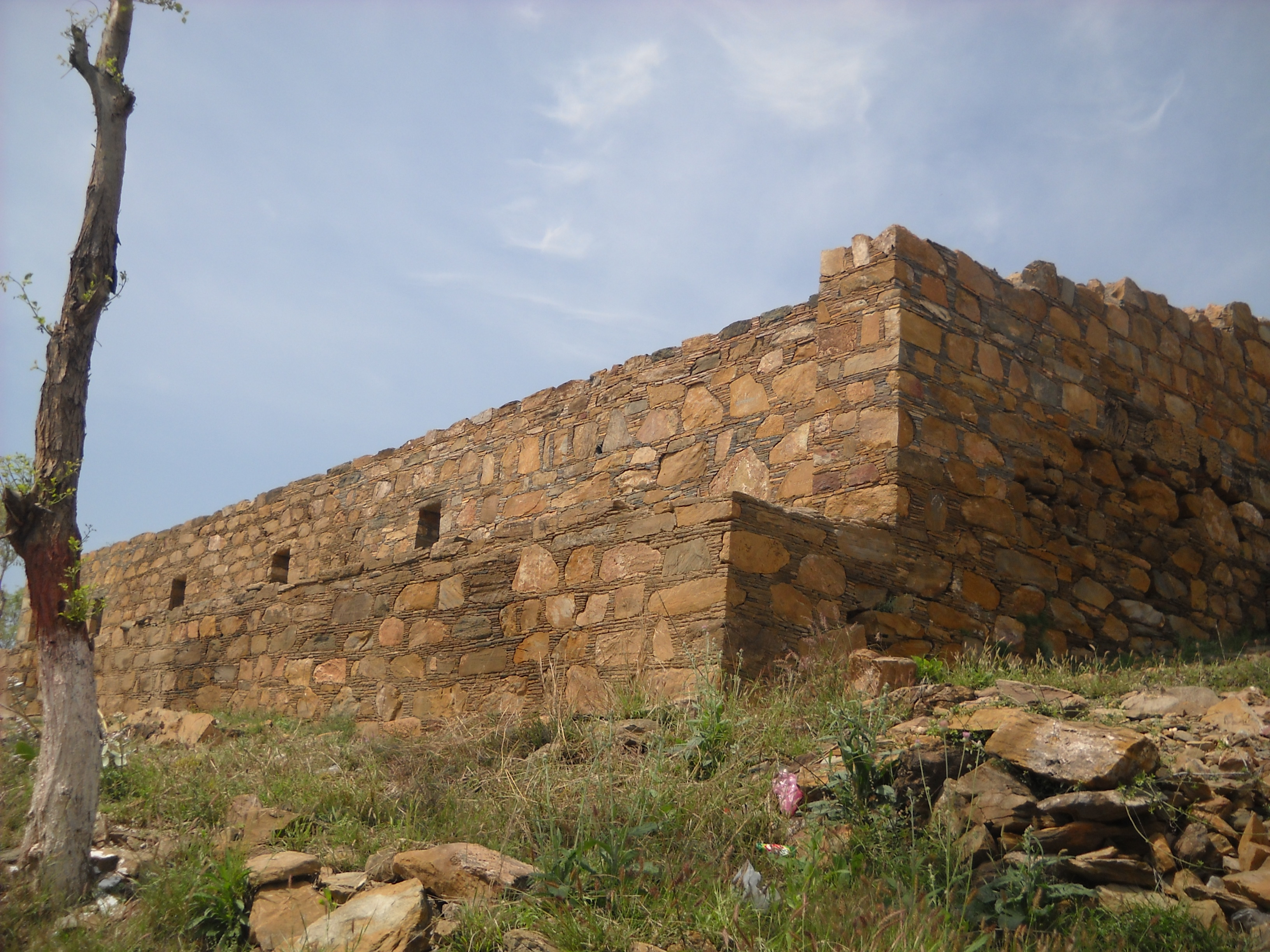
Side view of the Buddhist remains.

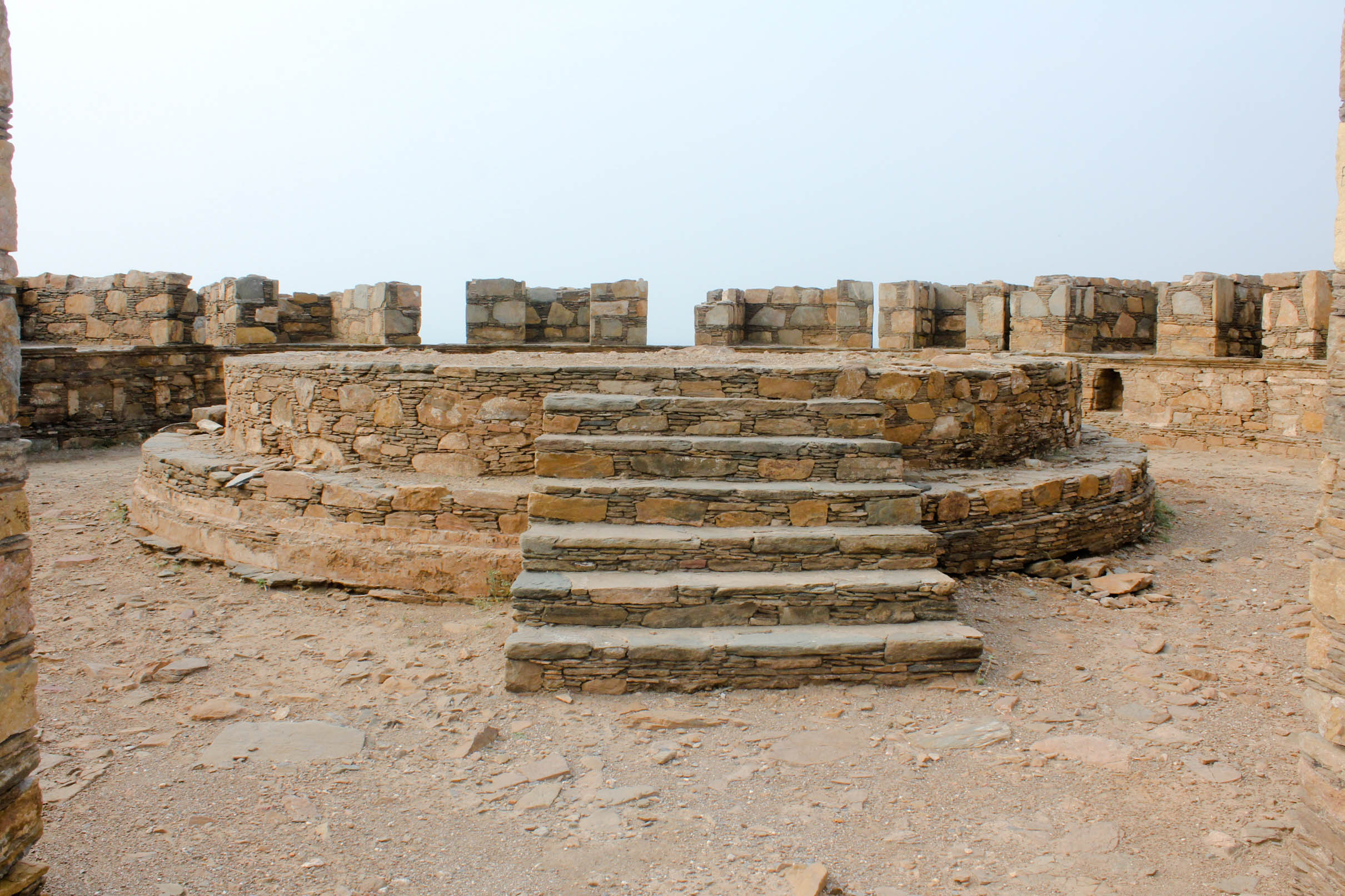
The main (round) Stupa

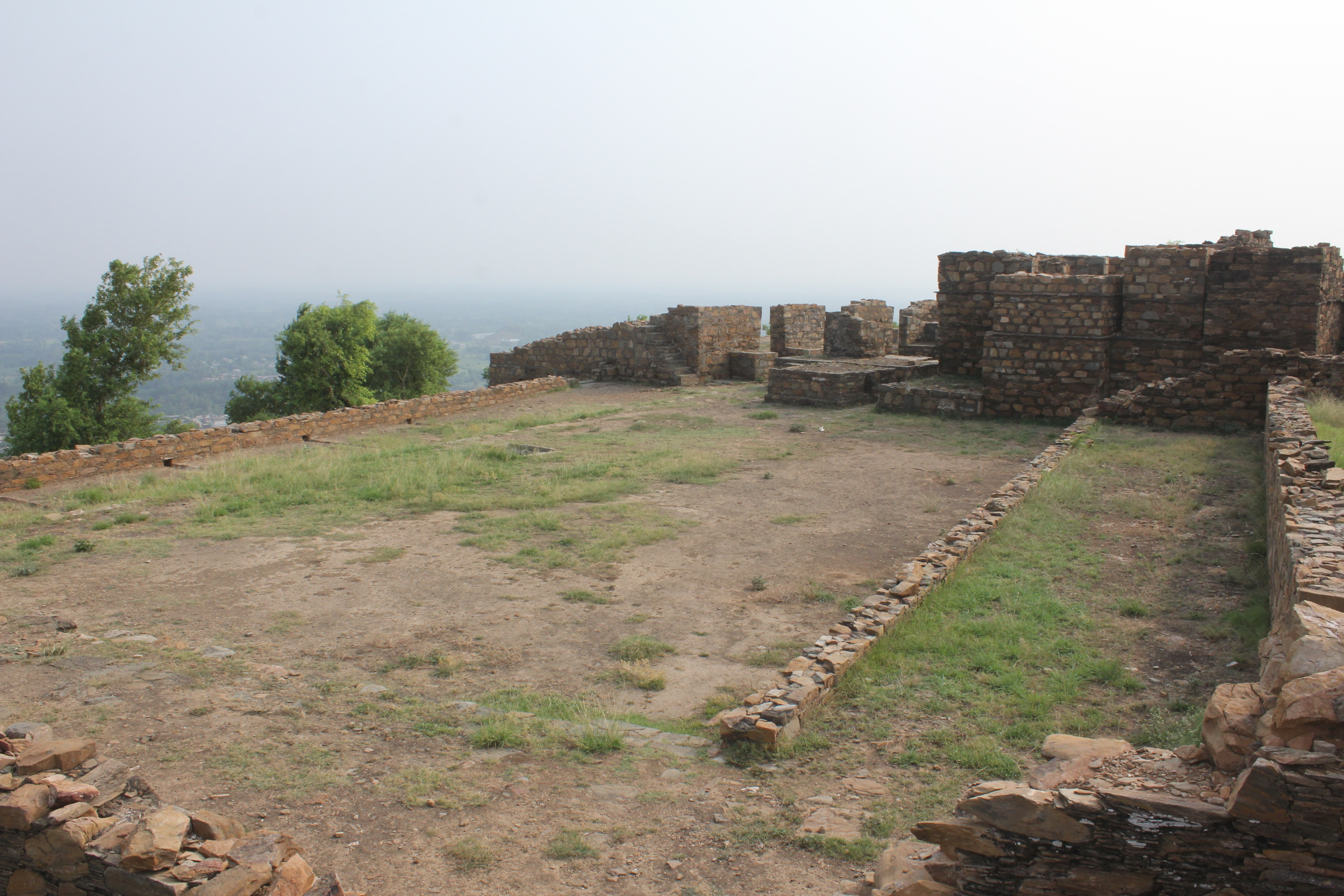
The Monastery and Water Tank.

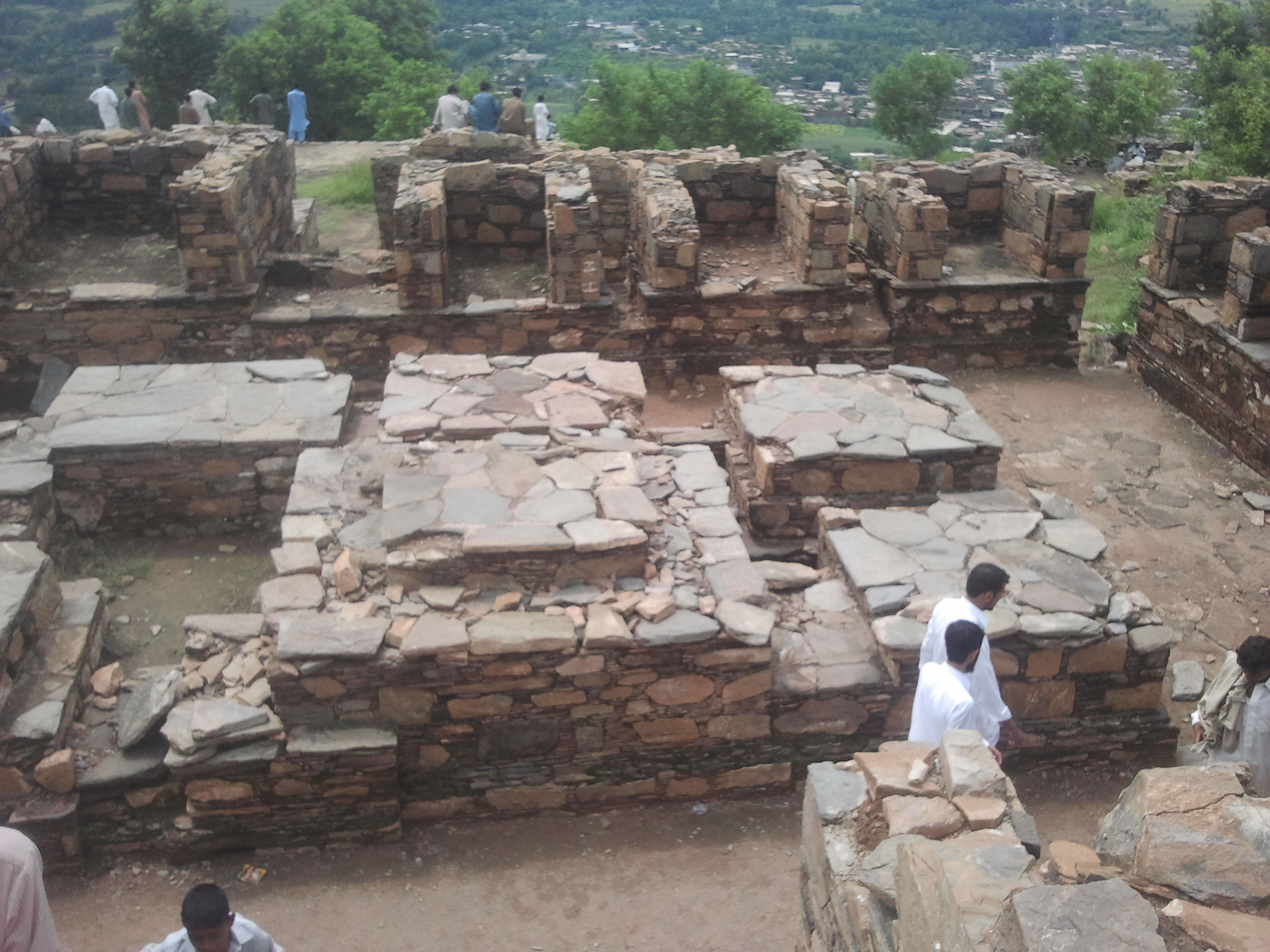
Jamal Garhi Buddhist ruins

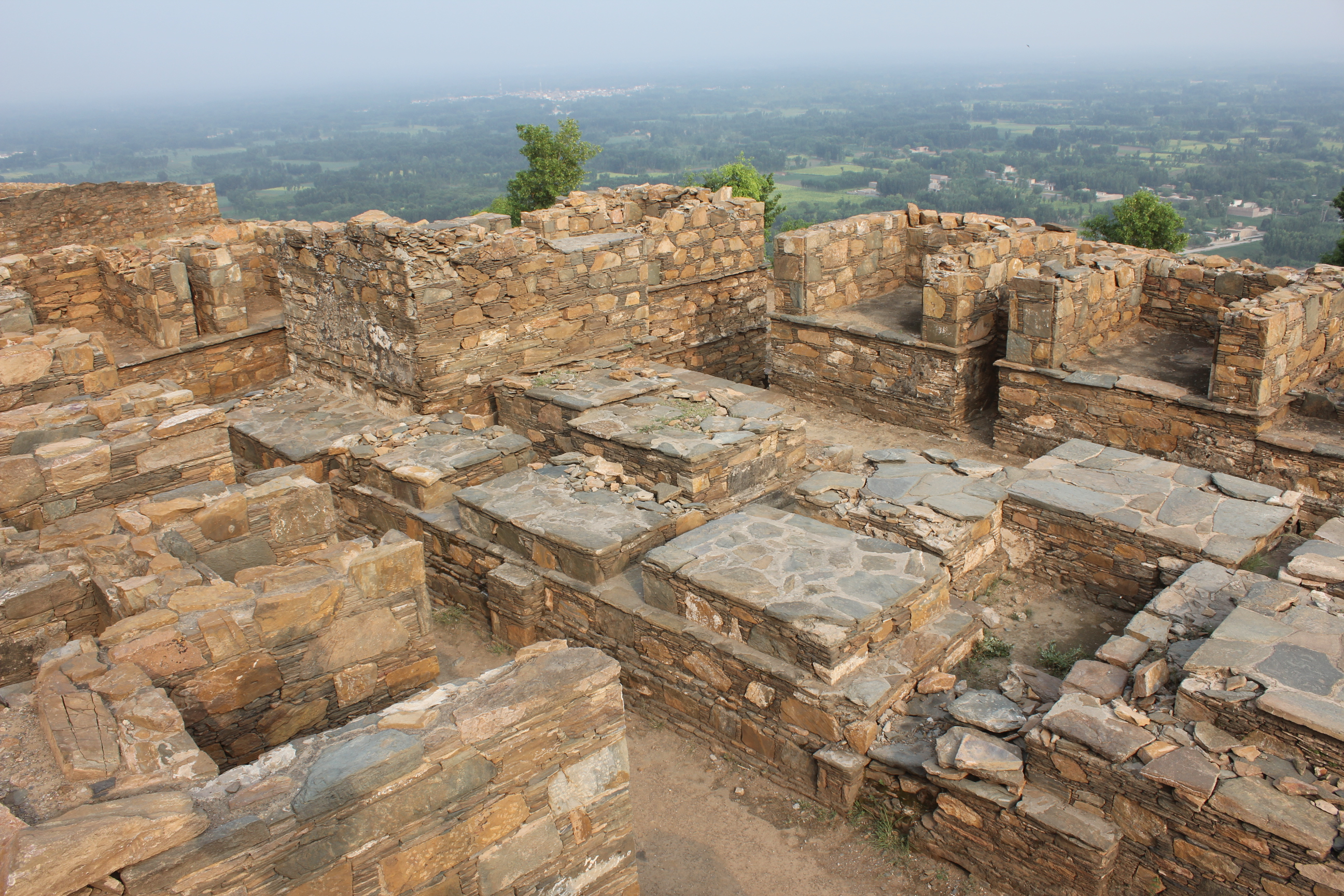
Court of Votive Stupas.

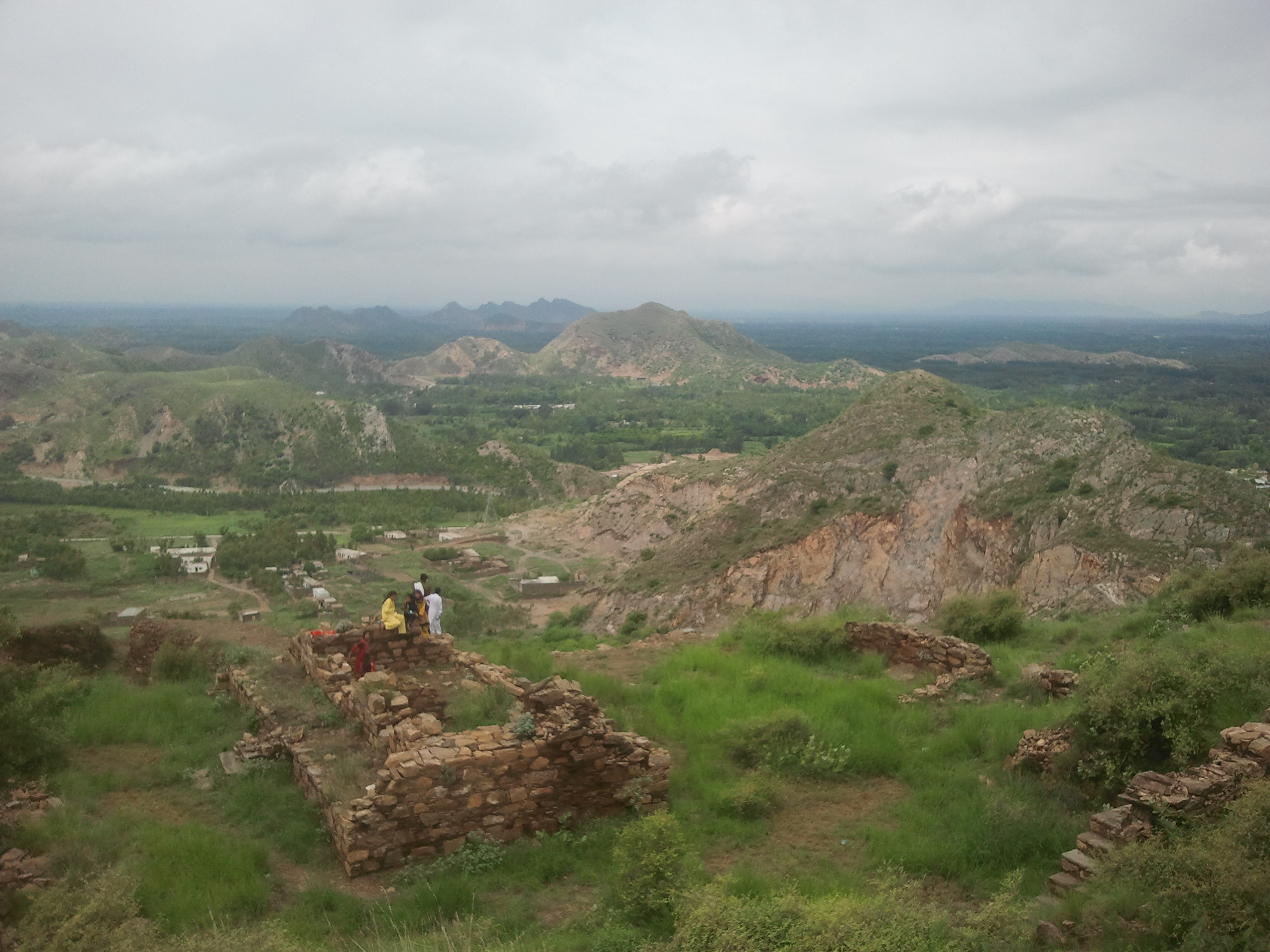
Jamal Garhi Buddhist ruins.

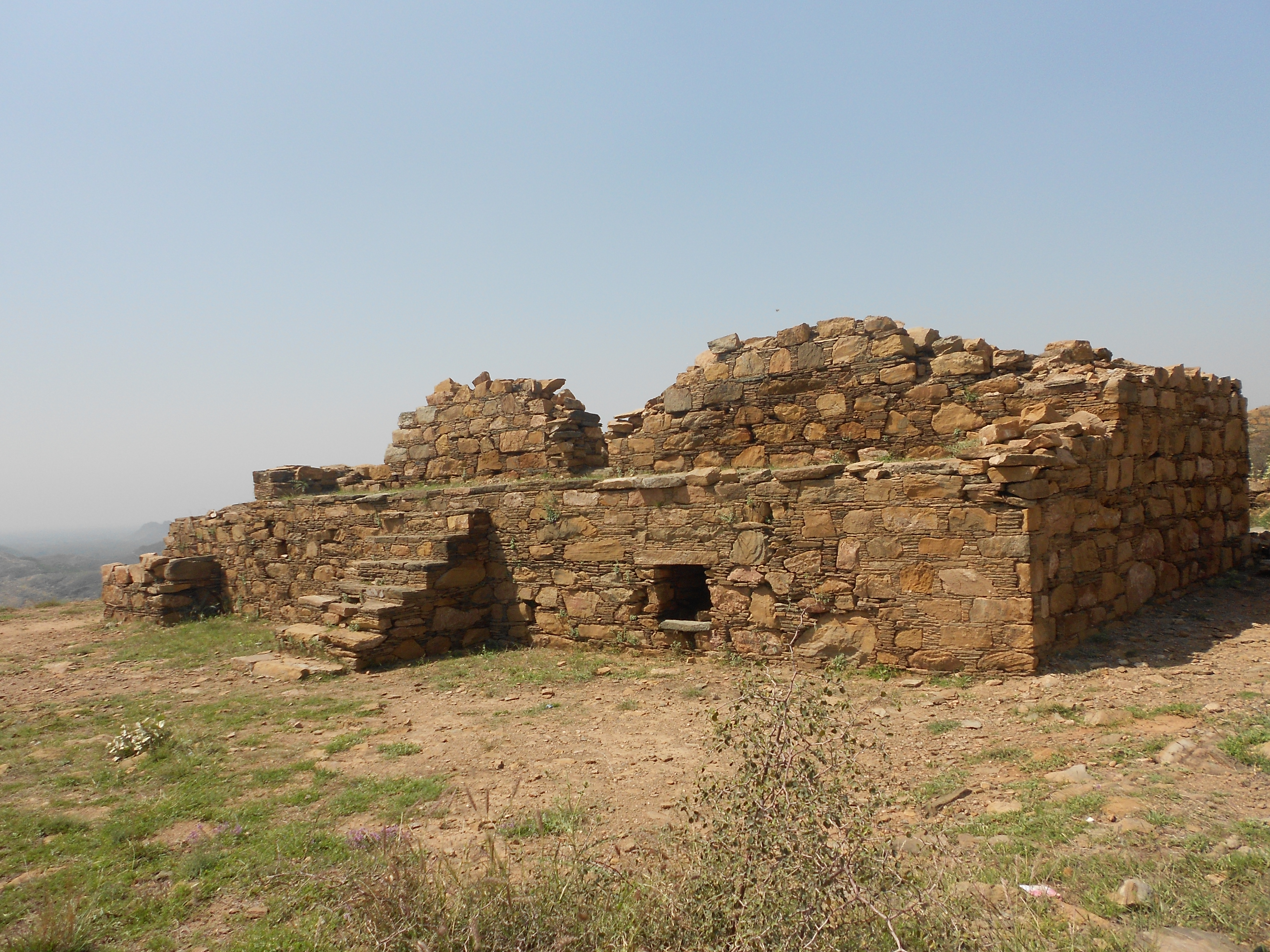
Some of the Buddhist Ruins.

== Sculptural remains ==
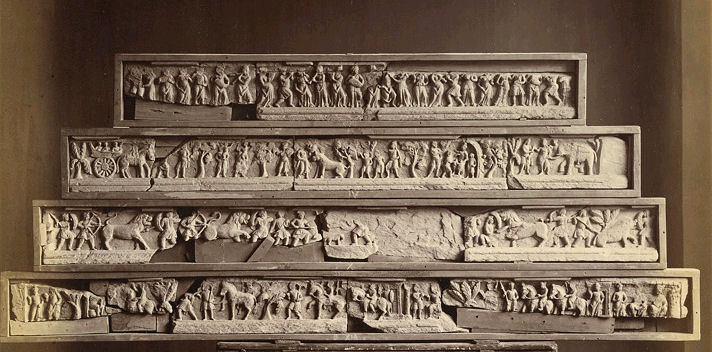
Stair friezes at Jamal Garhi.

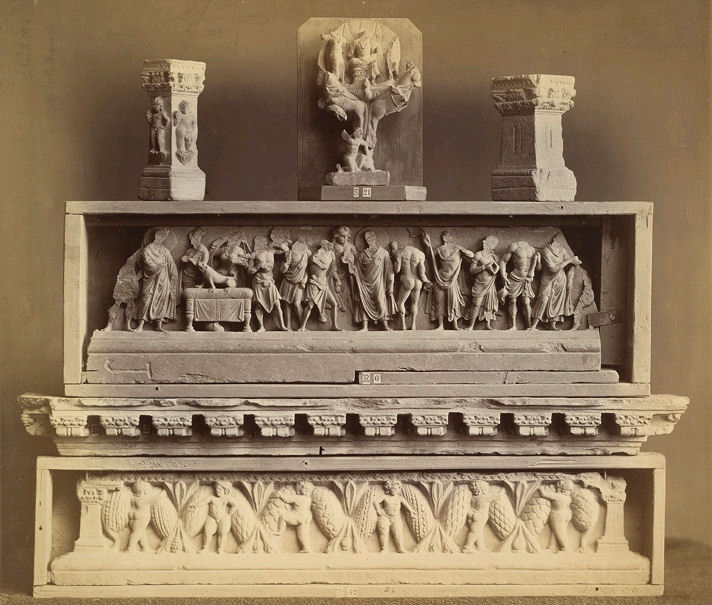
Sculptures at Jamal Garhi.

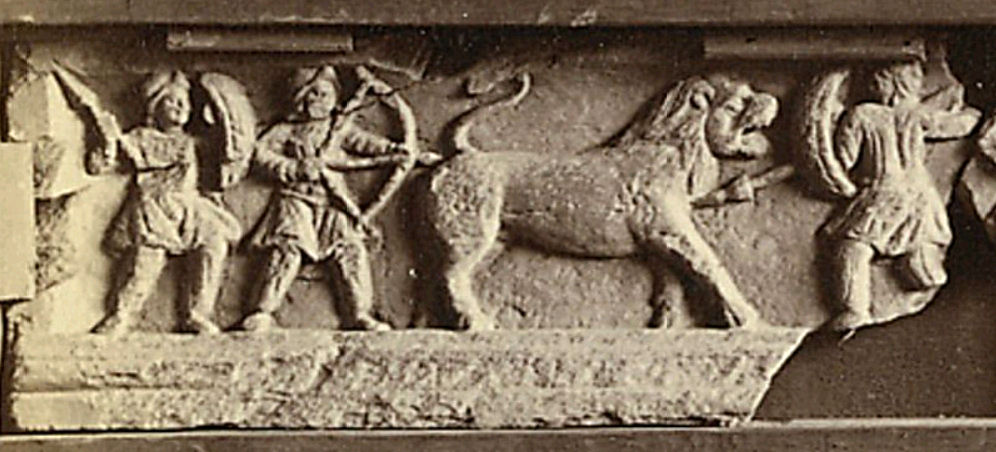
Hunting scene.

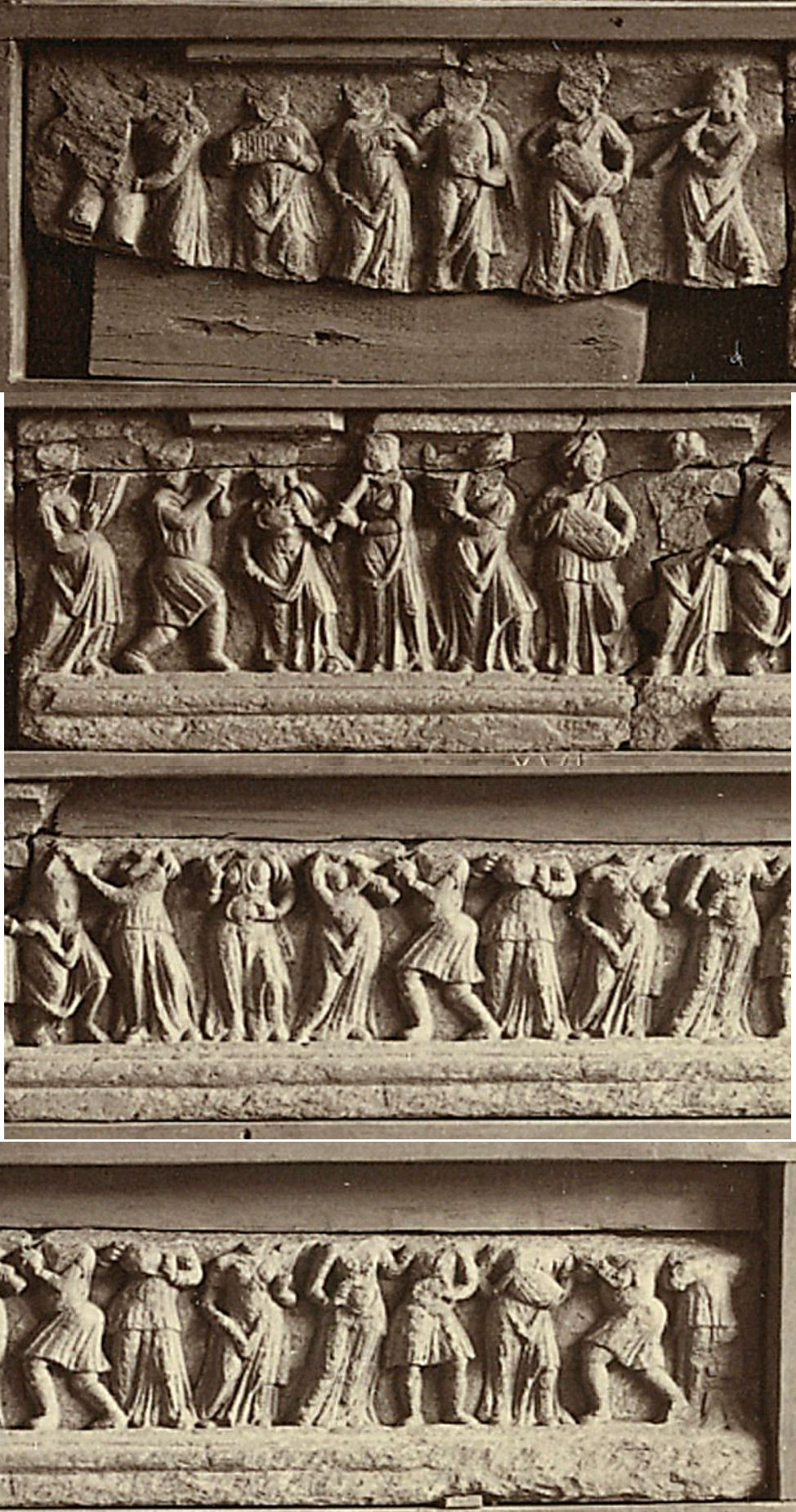
Revelers.

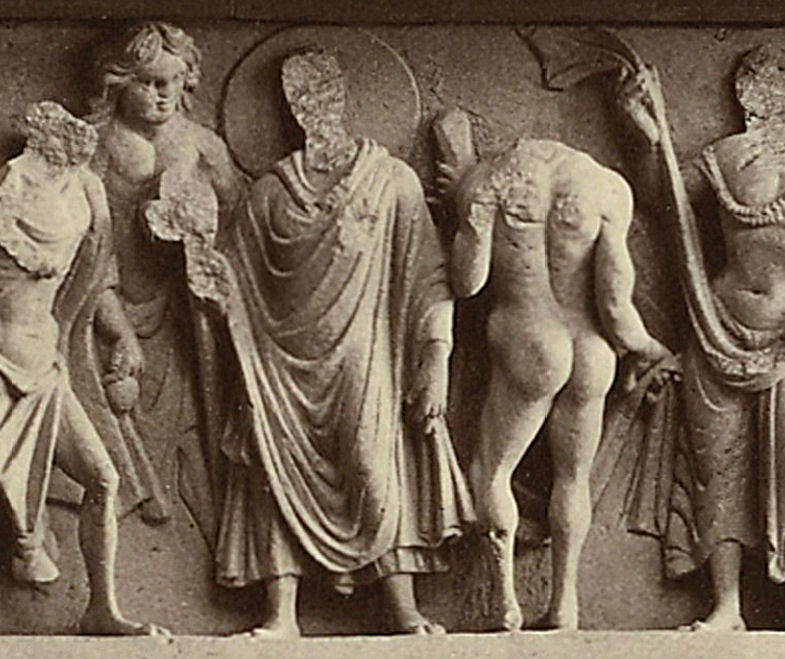
The Buddha and nude Vajrapani.

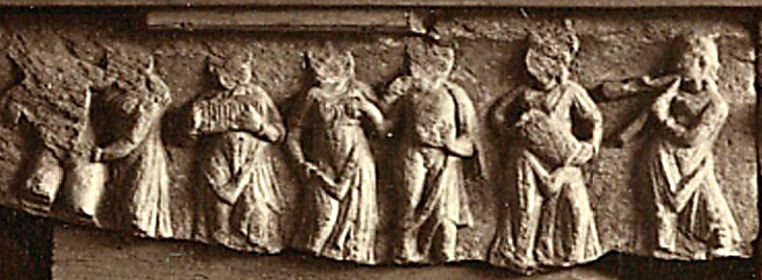
Wedding scene.

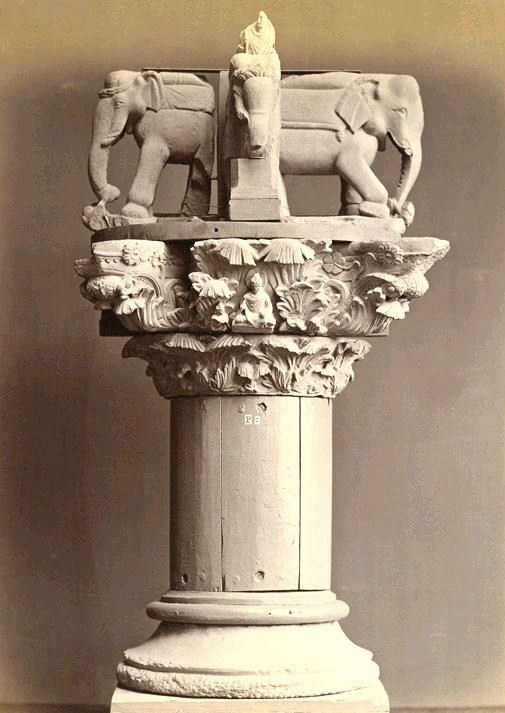
Base of pillar, Indo-Corinthian capitals and elephants from base of stupa.

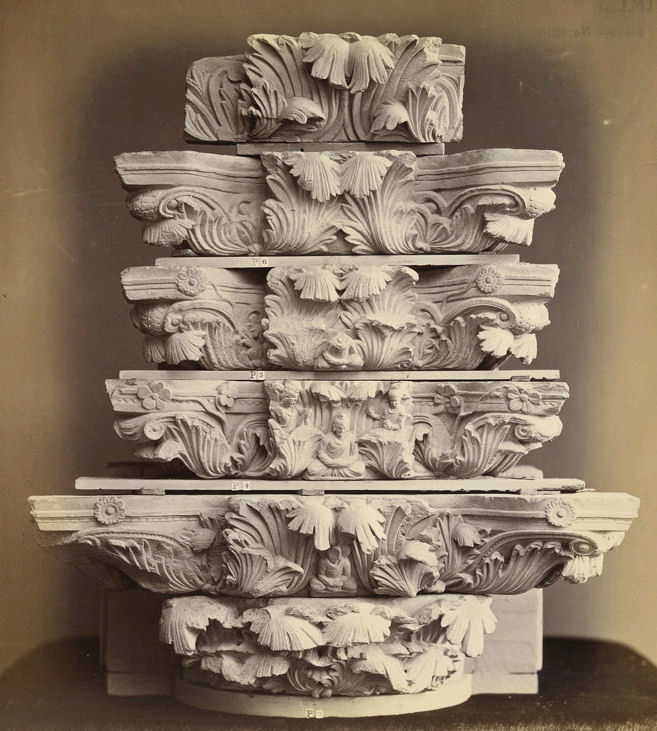
Series of Indo-Corinthian capitals from Jamal Garhi.

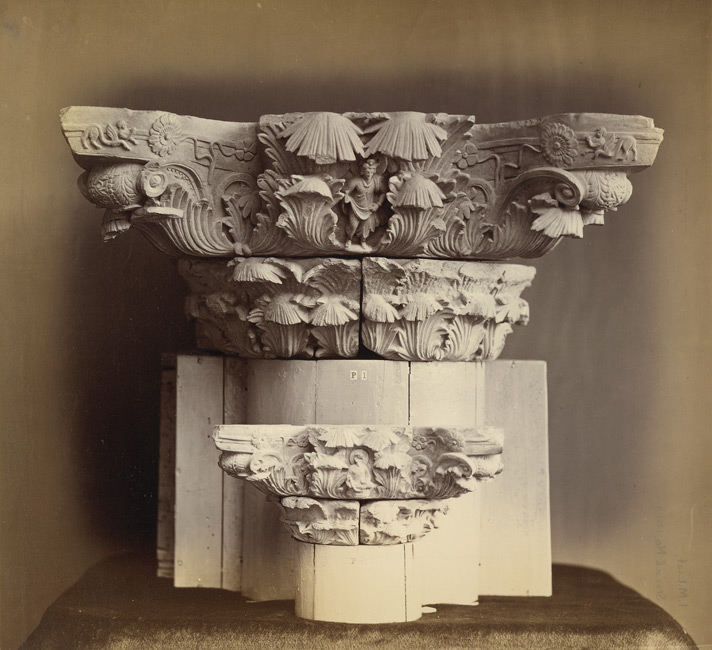
Indo-Corinthian capitals from Jamal Garhi.

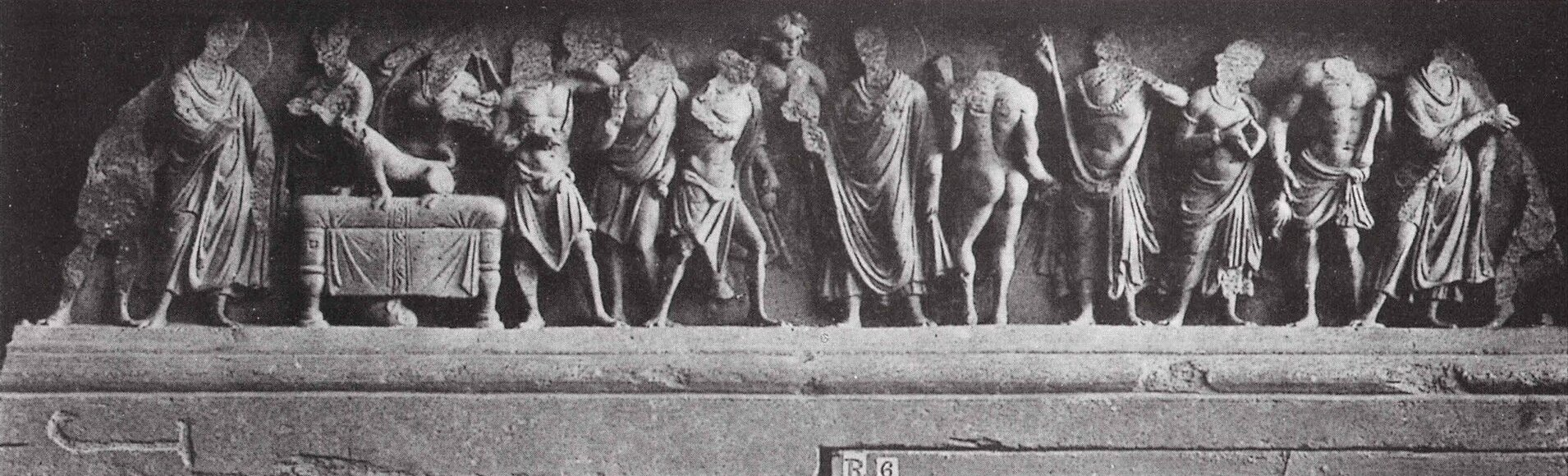
Miracles at Sravasti and Uruvilvā

== See also ==
- Seated Buddha from Gandhara, which was also found at the site.
- Ranigat a historical site in Buner near Swabi.
- Takht-i-Bahi
- The frieze of the Buddha and the nude Vajrapani at Jamal Garhi -
