= Mardan Tehsil =

Mardan Tehsil تحصیل مردان مردان تحصیل
- Tehsil
- Country: Pakistan
- Province: Khyber Pakhtunkhwa
- District: Mardan
- Capital: Mardan

Government
  - Chairman: Himayat Ullah Mayar (ANP)

Population (2017)
  - Tehsil: 1,403,394
  - Urban: 358,604
  - Rural: 1,044,790
- Time zone: UTC+5 (PST)
- Number of Union Councils: 58

Mardan Tehsil is a tehsil located in Mardan District, Khyber Pakhtunkhwa, Pakistan. The city of Mardan is the capital of the tehsil.

== History ==
During British rule Mardan was a tehsil of Peshawar District, its boundaries which were different from those of today were described in Imperial Gazetteer of India as "lying between 34°5' and 34°32' N. and 71°49' and 72°24' E., in the centre of the part of the District which lies north of the Kabul river, with an area of 610 square miles." At that time it comprised the greater portion of the Yusufzai plain, and with the Swabi tahsil formed the Yusufzai subdivision of Peshawar District. The population in 1901 was 137,215, compared with 113,877 in 1891. It contains the cantonment of Mardan (3,572) and 130 villages, including Hoti and Rustam. The land revenue and cesses in 1903-4 amounted to Rs. 1,76,000.
