= Mardan District =

District in Khyber Pakhtunkhwa, Pakistan

Coordinates: 34°15′00″N 72°15′00″E

Mardan District ضلع مردان مردان ولسوالۍ
- District of Khyber Pakhtunkhwa
- Mardan
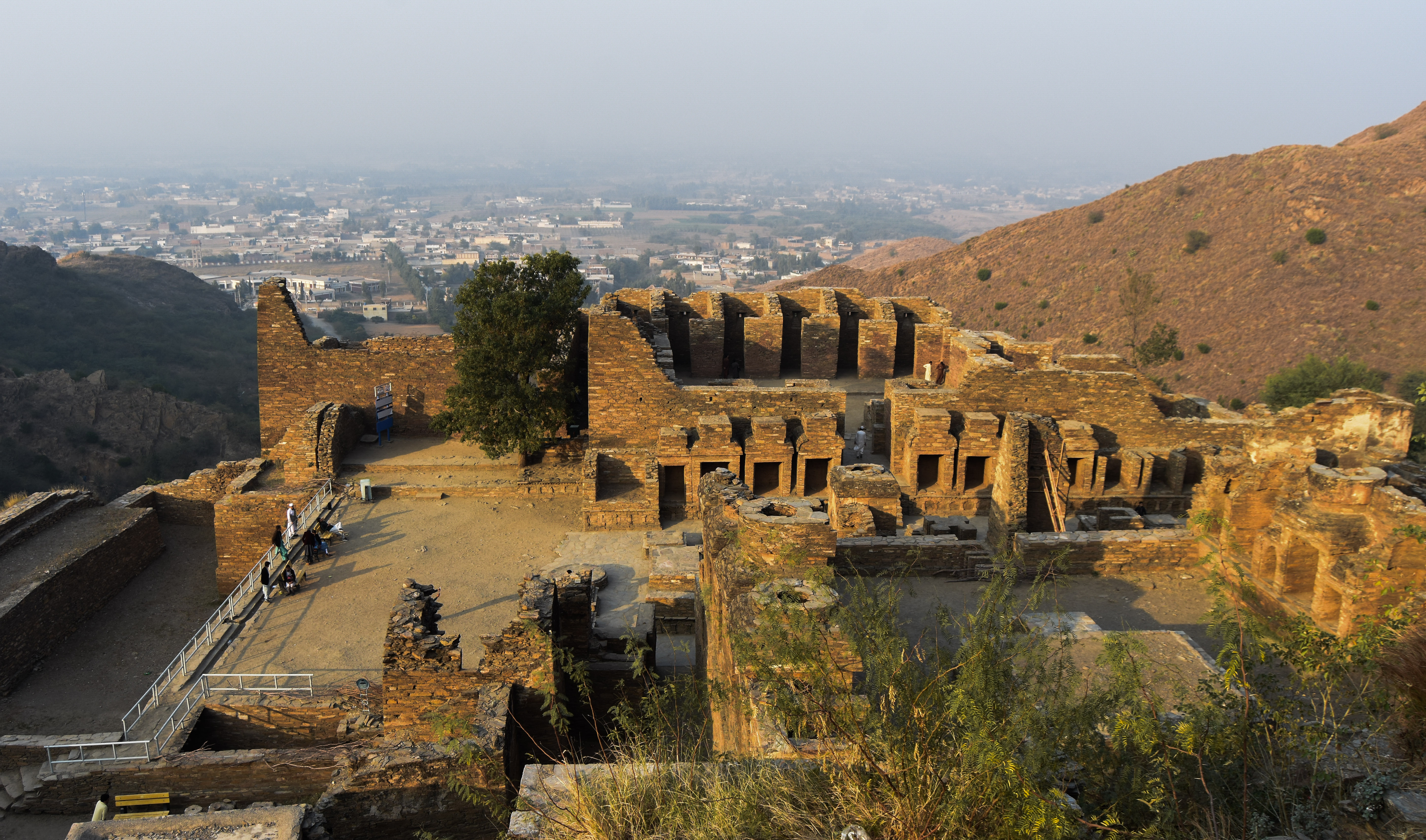
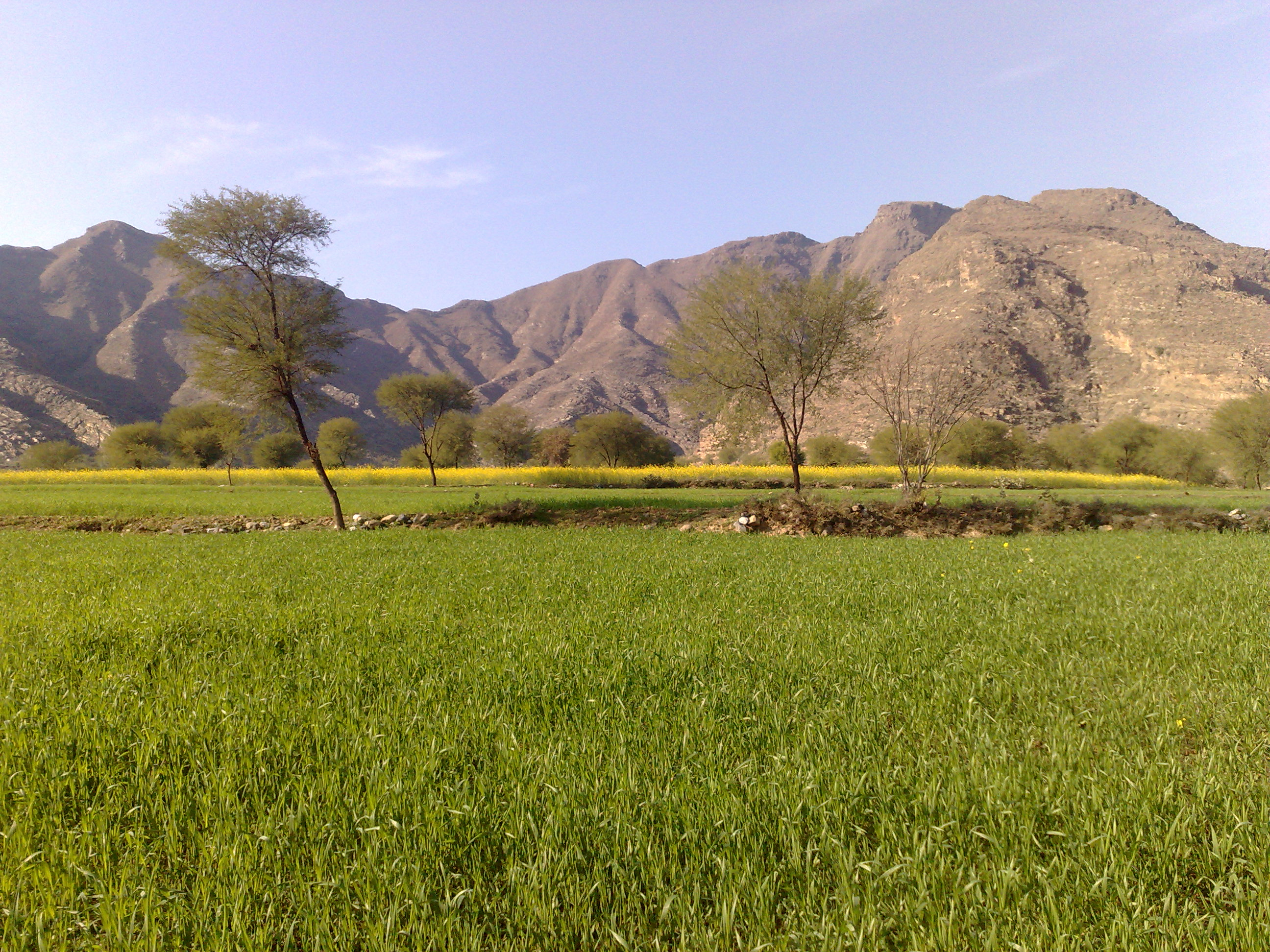
- Top: Takht-i-Bahi Buddhist ruins Bottom: Hills near Mian Khan

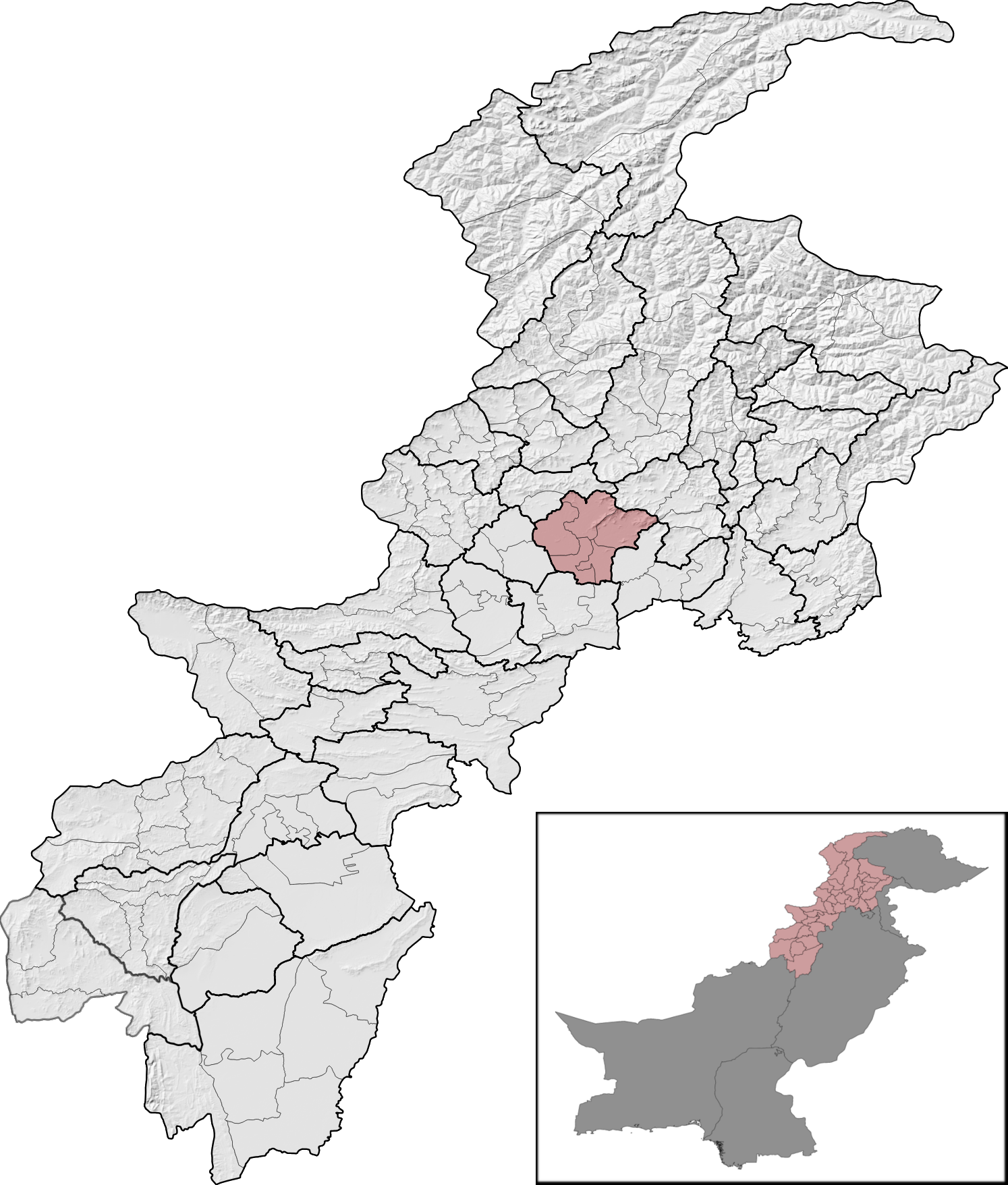
- Mardan District (red) in Khyber Pakhtunkhwa
- Country: Pakistan
- Province: Khyber Pakhtunkhwa
- Division: Mardan
- Headquarters: Mardan

Government
  - Type: District Administration
  - Deputy Commissioner: Mr. Habibullah Arif
  - Assistant Commissioner: Mr. Muhammad Shojain Vistro

Area
  - Total: 1,632 km^{2} (630 sq mi)

Population (2023)
  - Total: 2,744,898
  - Density: 1,682/km^{2} (4,356/sq mi)
  - Urban: 453,457 (16.52%)
  - Rural: 2,291,441

Literacy
  - Literacy rate: Total: 55.79%; Male: 68.31%; Female: 42.66%
- Time zone: UTC+5 (PST)
- Number of Tehsils: 6
- Website: mardan.kp.gov.pk

Mardan District (Pashto: مردان ولسوالۍ, Urdu: ضلع مردان) is a district in the Mardan Division of the Khyber Pakhtunkhwa province of Pakistan. The district is named after Mardan city, which is also the headquarters of the district. The district is famous for its agriculture industry and its archaeological sites, specifically of Takht-i-Bhai, Jamal Garhi and Sawal Dher.

== History ==
The literal meaning of Mardan is the "Land of Brave Men". The district lies from 34° 05' to 34° 32' north latitudes and 71" 48' to 72° 25' east longitudes. It is bordered with Buner on the east, Malakand on the north, Swabi on the south east, Nowshera on the south and the Charsadda and Mohmand districts on the west and north west respectively. The total area of the district is 1632 square kilometres.

=== Ancient history ===
Mardan District is a part of the ancient Peshawar valley. The whole area was once part of the ancient kingdom of Gandhara, the remains of which are scattered throughout the district.

The armies of the Alexander the Great reached the Indus Valley by two separate routes. One through the Khyber Pass and the other through Kunar, Bajaur, Swat, and Buner in 326 BCE. After Alexander's death, the valley came under the rule of Chandragupta, who ruled the valley from 297 to 321 BCE. During the reign of the Buddhist emperor Ashoka (the grandson of Chandragupta), Buddhism became the religion of the Peshawar Valley. The valley saw the revival of Hinduism after the Greeks took over in the time of King Mehanda. The Scythians and Indians followed and retained control of the valley till the 7th century CE.

=== Arrival of Afghans ===
By the 11th century, the Dilzak Pashtuns had appeared in the valley. At that time, the Peshawar valley was under the control of the rulers of Lahore. The Dilzak Pashtuns joined the Gakkhars who held the country between the Indus and the Jhelum rivers and compelled the Lahore rulers to cede to them the hill country, west of the Indus and south of the Kabul River.

=== Ghaznavid Era ===
In the 10th century the area came under the control of Sultan Sabuktigin who defeated Raja Jaipal, the Hindu ruler of Lahore. Sabuktgin's son Sultan Mahmud of Ghazni made this area the rallying point for his numerous raids into the interior of India. In the 12th century the Ghaurid empire of the Turkic origin overthrew the Ghaznavis and the era of Ghaznavis came to an end.

=== Mughal Era ===
In 1505, the Mughal emperor Babur invaded the area through Khyber Pass. Baber swiftly captured the area. The people of Swat in those days were of mix origins. On one side of the river lived Pashtuns along with Gujjar, Syriake people of whom many were Sikhs, Hindus and Muslims. In the Battle of Bajaur in 1519, Baber defeated a Gibar Swati Tajik dynasty. Due to the military strength of the Yusufzai, Babur needed security from their location in the hills that threatened his empire. As part of a treaty of peace between Babur and the Yusufzai tribe to establish mutual security and ties, Babur then married Bibi Mubarika. During the Aurangzeb regime, the Pashtun tribes revolted and Aurangzeb himself led his army to re-establish his authority as struggle which lasted for two years, he finally subdued the Pashtuns. In the same war the prominent rebel leader, Darya Khan Afridi was killed and the revolt was crushed.

=== British Era ===
Ranjit Singh occupied the Attock region in 1814 and Peshawar city in 1822. He left Hari Singh Nalwa in command and withdrew himself to Lahore. Peshawar city, Nowshera and Hazara were under Sikh rule for a while. Hazara was set free by Tanoli clan from Sikhs but fell to Britain in 1838. Peshawar city also fell to Pashtuns in 1834 and Nalwa died in the Battle of Jamrud. Soon the British took over. The British then went after the Sikhs and the Sikhs were defeated by the British in the Second Sikh War. Major Lawrence was appointed first Deputy Commissioner of Peshawar. From that time Peshawar city and Attock regions only (This does not include most of what is Khyber-Pakhtunkhwa today) became an administrative district under the Punjab Government. In 1909, the North-West Frontier Province (now known as Khyber-Pakhtunkhwa) was constituted and in 1937, Peshawar District was bifurcated into Peshawar and Mardan districts. Britain tried its best to include FATA, Dir, Swat and other region into Khyber-Pakhtunkhwa but they suffered heavy setback and finally came to an agreement in the 1920s that Britain will no longer bother the tribes and Swat region.

== Geography ==
Mardan district may broadly be divided into two parts, north eastern mountenious area and south western plain area. The entire northern side of the district is bounded by small hills. In the district, the highest points in these hills are Pajja or Sakra, 2056 meters high and Garo or Pato, 1816 meters high. The south western half of the district is mostly composed of fertile plain with low hills strewn across it. It is generally accepted that this plain once formed the bed of a lake which was gradually filled up by the load of the river flowing into from the surrounding hills. From the foothills the plain runs down at first with a steep slope which carried the rain water to the lower levels and ultimately to the Kabul river.

=== Rivers and streams ===
Generally stream flows from north to the south. Most of the streams drain into Kabul river. Kalpani, an important stream of the district rises in the Baizai and flowing southwards join Kabul river. Other important streams which join Kalpani are Baghiari Khawar on the west and Muqam Khawar, coming from Sudham valley and Naranji Khawar from the Narangi hills on the left.

=== Climate ===
The summer season is extremely hot. A steep rise of temperature observed from May to June. Even July, August and September record quite high temperatures. During May and June dust storms are frequent at night. The temperature reaches to its maximum in the month of June i.e. 43.5 °C (110.3 °F). Due to intensive cultivation and artificial irrigation the tract is humid and heat is oppressive (Heat Index 69 on 7 July 2006). However, a rapid fat! of temperature has been recorded from October onwards. The coldest months are December and January. The mean minimum temperature recorded for the month of January the coldest month is 0.5 °C (32.9 °F).

Most of the rainfall occurs in the month of July, August, December and January. Maximum rainfall recorded for the month of August the rainiest month is 12S.8Smm. Towards the end of cold weather there are occasional thunder storms and hail storms. The relative humidity is quite high throughout the year while maximum humidity has been recorded in December i.e. 73.33 percent.

=== Flora ===
The present flora of the irrigated areas is exotic. The common trees are mesquite, ber, different species of acacia and jand. The most common shrubs are tarmariax, articulata, spands, akk, small red poppy, spera, pueghambrigul, drab grass,eamelthorl and pohli chaulai etc.

=== Fauna ===
The district has a variety of fauna including 18 mammals, 120 birds and 3 reptiles.

The mammals of Mardan district.
Indian wolf,Canis lupus pallipes
Golden jackal,Canis aureus
Red fox,Vulpes vulpes
Jungle cat,Felis chaus
Leopard cat,Prionailurus bengalensis
Striped hyena,Hyaena hyaena
Himalayan black bear,Ursus thibetanus laniger
Indian grey mongoose,Herpestes edwardssi
Kashmir field mouse,Apodemus rusiges
Himalayan goral,Naemorhedus goral
Indian muntjac,Muntiacus muntjak

The birds of Mardan district
Chukar partridge,Alectoris chukar
See-see partridge,Ammoperdix griseogularis
Black francolin,Francolinus francolinus
Grey francolin,Francolinus pondicerianus
Common wood pigeon,Columba palumbus

== Demographics ==
=== Population ===
Historical population
Year	Pop.	±% p.a.
1951	357,455	—
1961	481,297	+3.02%
1972	696,622	+3.42%
1981	881,465	+2.65%
1998	1,460,100	+3.01%
2017	2,373,061	+2.59%
2023	2,744,898	+2.46%

As of the 2023 census, Mardan district has 400,859 households and a population of 2,744,898. The district has a sex ratio of 105.44 males to 100 females and a literacy rate of 55.79%: 68.31% for males and 42.66% for females. 786,360 (28.69% of the surveyed population) are under 10 years of age. 453,342 (16.52%) live in urban areas. Pashto was the predominant language, spoken by 99.07% of the population.

=== Ethnic groups ===
Pashtun, Gujjar and Sayeds are Major ethnic groups in Mardan district.

=== Religion ===
Religion in contemporary Mardan District
Religious group	1941		2017		2023	
Religious group	Pop.	%	Pop.	%	Pop.	%
Islam	281,161	93.91%	2,370,304	99.87%	2,732,331	99.69%
Sikhism	9,091	3.04%	—N/a	—N/a	167	0.01%
Hinduism	8,709	2.91%	329	0.01%	379	0.01%
Christianity	360	0.12%	2,021	0.09%	7,567	0.28%
Others	63	0.02%	745	0.03%	248	0.01%
Total Population	299,384	100%	2,373,399	100%	2,740,692	100%
Note: 1941 census data is for Mardan tehsil of erstwhile Mardan district, which roughly corresponds to contemporary Mardan district. District and tehsil borders have changed since 1941.

Religious groups in Mardan District (British North-West Frontier Province era)
Religious group	1911		1921		1931		1941	
Religious group	Pop.	%	Pop.	%	Pop.	%	Pop.	%
Islam	293,695	95.65%	316,842	95.76%	341,109	95.56%	483,575	95.47%
Hinduism	7,344	2.39%	9,909	2.99%	7,367	2.06%	10,677	2.11%
Sikhism	5,889	1.92%	3,936	1.19%	8,204	2.3%	11,838	2.34%
Christianity	126	0.04%	197	0.06%	292	0.08%	449	0.09%
Jainism	1	0%	0	0%	0	0%	0	0%
Zoroastrianism	1	0%	0	0%	0	0%	0	0%
Buddhism	0	0%	0	0%	0	0%	0	0%
Judaism	0	0%	0	0%	0	0%	0	0%
Others	0	0%	0	0%	0	0%	0	0%
Total population	307,056	100%	330,884	100%	356,972	100%	506,539	100%
Note: British North-West Frontier Province era district borders are not an exact match in the present-day due to various bifurcations to district borders — which since created new districts — throughout the region during the post-independence era that have taken into account population increases. Note2: 1911, 1921, and 1931 figures are for Mardan Tehsil and Swabi Tehsil, with Mardan District being created in 1937, having been bifurcated from Peshawar District.

== Food ==
The most common diet of the people is bread which is mainly made of wheat flour but maize bread is also eaten. Generally the foods are spicy. The people of the area are fond of meat, especially various forms of beef cooked in shape of chapli kebab, seekh kebab and tikkas etc. Mostly black tea with milk is taken as hot drink but Qahwa (green tea) is also popular and is liked by most of the people.

The oranges are a local famous fruit which is grown in Rustam valley in Palay, Palo Dheray, Pirsai, Baroch and Malandray villages. These oranges are transported to various parts of the country. A new access road to these villages is being constructed via Rustam through Kaludheri Srakabroona Baringan Malandry to Buner District.

== Dwellings ==
The villages are divided into Kandis have congested house. Each Kandi is further occupied by sub-section. The division of Kandis are on the pattern of agricultural lands. Their houses are generally consists of two or three rooms and a courtyard turned as ghollai and verandah. The cattle and poultry are also accommodated beside the shelter for family.

Each Kandi of the village has its own mosque and its own Maulvi and a place of meeting or for public assembly called Hujra. In most cases it is the property of elders of the Kandi who is expected to feed and give shelter to the visitors and travellers. These Hujras are commonly used for the settlement of public disputes/business beside public meetings. Residents of Kandi assemble there to smoke, hear news of the day and discuss their problems and politics. Nowadays the people in service abroad have accumulated sufficient wealth which brought a distinct change in the life of the villagers who construct pacca houses of cement, bricks and timber.

A Tandoor (Oven) is also found for baking bread in many houses and some time women of three or four houses assembled on one Tandoor (Oven) for baking bread on their turn. The houses have huge compound walls around with gates. Chairs and tables are used in the houses of well-to-do persons whereas others use the ordinary cot (Charpoy).

== Occupations ==
Most of the people are farmers in profession in villages. They are engaged in agriculture either directly or indirectly. Industrial labour has increased after the establishment of factories in different places of the district. Some people are engaged in-business and Government service also.

== Economy ==
Mardan is far famous for its economy and business mind people. Recent project of China Pakistan Economic Corridor bring more importance to this era. The border of Mardan, Rashakai is one of the major Economic Zone of this project which strengthen the Economy of Mardan.

== Administration ==
The district of Mardan is administratively subdivided into five Tehsils.

Tehsil	Name (Urdu) (Pashto)	Area (km²)	Pop. (2023)	Density (ppl/km²) (2023)	Literacy rate (2023)	Union Councils
Ghari Kapura Tehsil	(Urdu: تحصیل گڑھی کپورہ)(Pashto: ګړۍ کپوره تحصیل)	143	319,465	2,234.02	51.70%	
Katlang Tehsil	(Urdu: تحصیل کاٹلنگ)(Pashto: کاټلنګ تحصیل)	422	377,535	894.63	61.47%	
Mardan Tehsil	(Urdu: تحصیل مردان)(Pashto: مردان تحصیل)	335	1,040,893	3,107.14	56.41%	
Rustam Tehsil	(Urdu: تحصیل رستم)(Pashto: رستم تحصیل)	379	279,527	737.54	49.98%	
Takht Bhai Tehsil	(Urdu: تحصیل تخت بھائی)(Pashto: تخت بای تحصیل)	353	727,478	2,060.84	56.02%	

== Provincial and National Assembly Seats ==
The district is represented in the provincial assembly by eight elected MPAs who represent the following constituencies:

=== National Assembly ===
District Mardan is represented by three MNAs in national assembly.

Member of National Assembly	Party affiliation	Constituency	Year
Mujahid Ali	PTI	NA-21 (Mardan-I)	2023
Atif Khan	PTI	NA-22 (Mardan-II)	2023
Ali Muhammad Khan	PTI	NA-23 (Mardan-III)	2023

=== Provincial Assembly ===
Member of Provincial Assembly	Party affiliation	Constituency	Year
		PK-54 Mardan-I	2023
		PK-55 Mardan-II	2023
		PK-56 Mardan-III	2023
		PK-57 Mardan-IV	2023
		PK-58 Mardan-V	2023
		PK-59 Mardan-VI	2023
		PK-60 Mardan-VII	2023
		PK-61 Mardan-VIII	2023

== See also ==
- Takkar massacre
- Takht-i-Bahi
- Jamal Garhi
- Jamila Gilani
- Sawal Dher
