= Kiar Gali Latif khan =

Kiargali Latif Khan Kiargali
- Town and Village
- Country: Pakistan
- Province: Khyber Pakhtunkhwa
- District: Battagram District
- Tehsil: Battagram Tehsil
- Union Council: Gijbori
- Village Council: Shingli Bala
- Time zone: UTC5 (PST)
- Area code: 0997

Kiar gali latif khan or Kiargali is a village in Battagram District in Pakistan's Khyber Pakhtunkhwa province. It is part of Gijbori Union Council and is located about three kilometres from the district headquarters Battagram along the Shahrah-e-Resham (Karakoram Highway) or silk route. There is only one khel shampori..

== See also ==
- Battagram
- Khyber Pakhtunkhwa
