= Shingli Payeen =

Town and Village in Khyber Pakhtunkhwa, Pakistan

Shingli Payeen Urdu: شنگلی پائیں Pashto: شنګلې پائېن Kuze Shingalo
- Town and Village
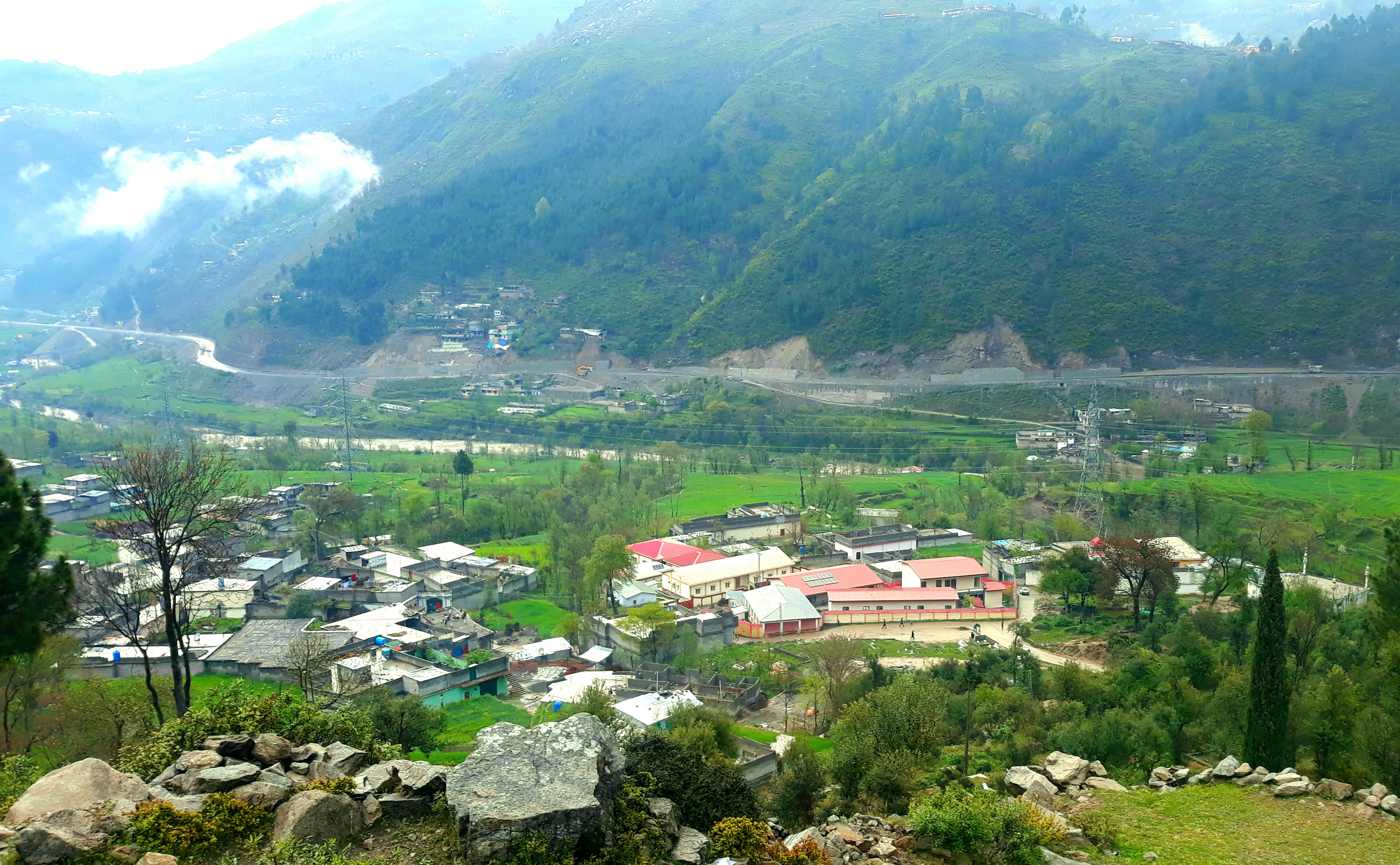
- Shingli Payeen 2020

- Location in Pakistan
- Coordinates: 34°41′06″N 72°58′58″E
- Country: Pakistan
- Province: Khyber Pakhtunkhwa
- District: Battagram District
- Tehsil: Battagram Tehsil
- Union Council: Peshora
- Elevation: 1,000 m (3,300 ft)
- Time zone: UTC5 (PST)

Shingli Payeen is a village of Battagram District in Khyber-Pakhtunkhwa province of Pakistan. It is part of Peshora Union Council and lies within Battagram Tehsil and is located about Five kilometres from the district headquarters Battagram along the Shahrah-e-Resham (Karakoram Hwy) or silk route.

- Anis Ur Rahman
- Battagram District
- Battagram Tehsil
- Deshiwal
- Dadokhel Beror
- Khyber-Pakhtunkhwa
