= Battagram (disambiguation) =

Battagram may refer to:

- Battagram, a city in north-eastern Khyber Pakhtunkhwa, Pakistan
  - Battagram District
  - Battagram Tehsil
  - Battagram Valley
- Battagram, Charsadda, a town in north-western Khyber Pakhtunkhwa, Pakistan
