= Chappargram =

Chappargram Urdu: چھپرگرام Pashto: چھپرګراﻣ
- Town and Village
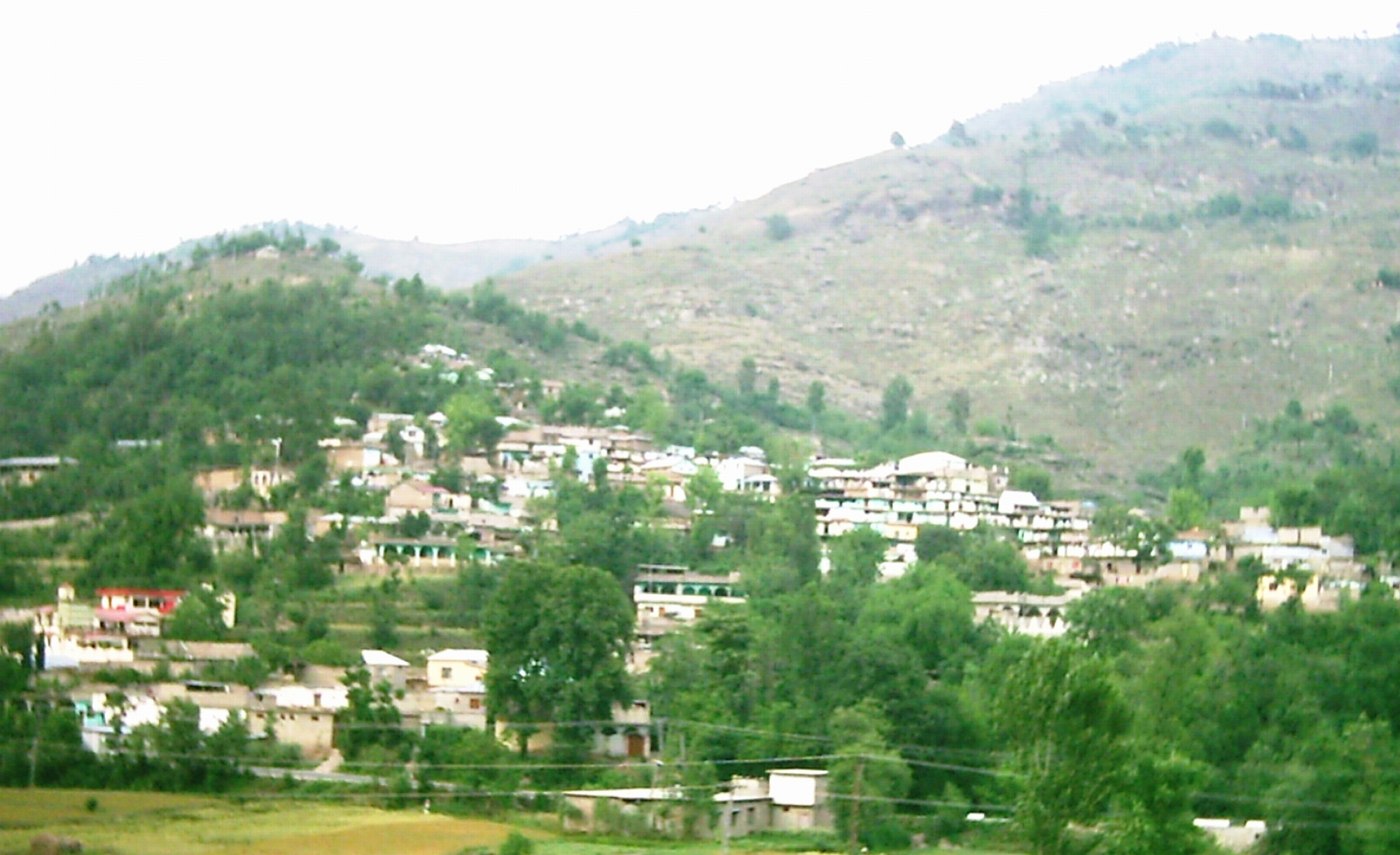

- Location in Pakistan
- Coordinates: 34°39′45″N 73°2′59″E
- Country: Pakistan
- Region: Khyber Pakhtunkhwa
- District: Battagram District
- Tehsil: Battagram Tehsil
- Union Council: Ajmera
- Village: Chappargram
- Elevation: 1,073 m (3,520 ft)

Population
  - Total: 7,500 (approx)
- Time zone: UTC+5 (PST)

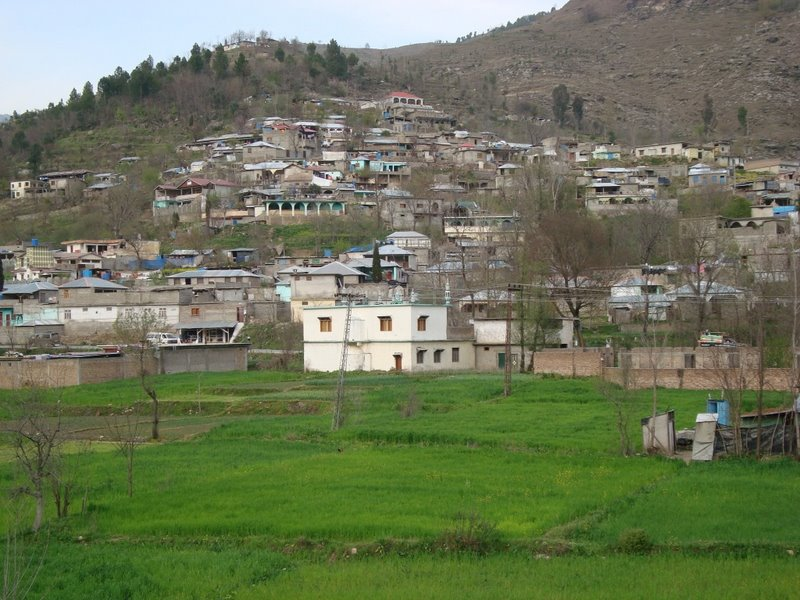
Chappargram before earthquake

Chappargram or Chapargram (Urdu: چھپرگرام, Pashto: چھپرګراﻣ) is a village of Battagram District in Khyber-Pakhtunkhwa province of Pakistan. It is part of Ajmera Union Council and lies within Battagram Tehsil and is located about four kilometres from the district headquarters Battagram along the Shahrah-e-Resham (Karakoram Highway) or silk route.

Chappargram was one of the villages affected by the 2005 Kashmir earthquake of October 8, 2005 when more than 100 people were killed and approximately 500 were injured. Many residents of the village were rendered homeless and without shelter

== Gallery ==
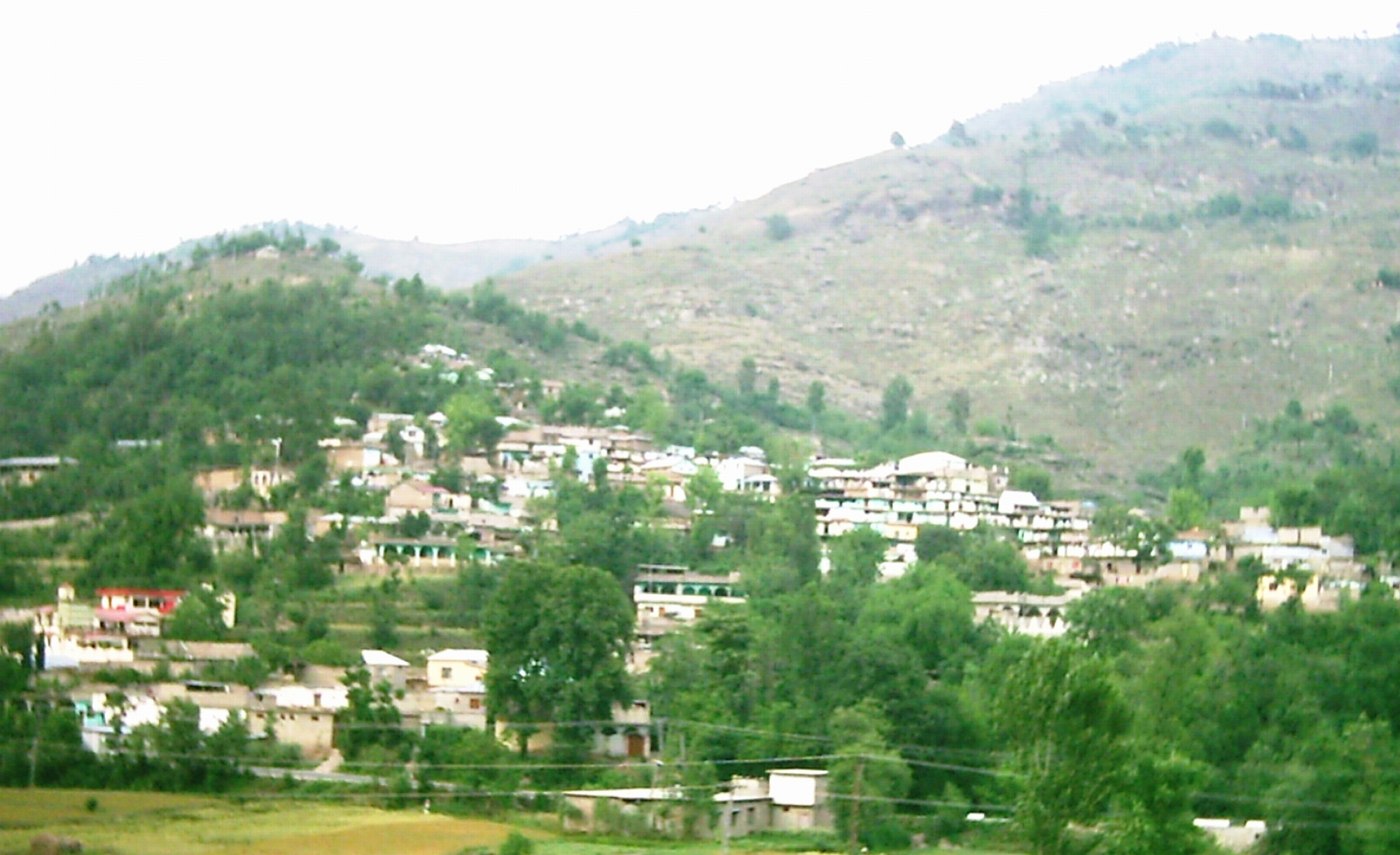
Chappargram, a village in the Battagram District.

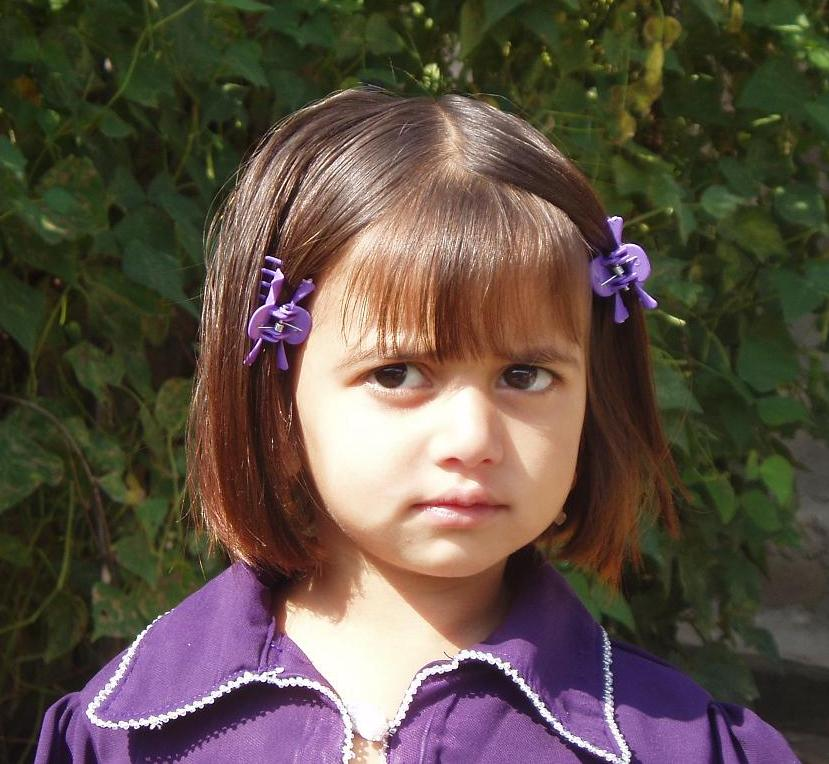
A child from Chappargram.

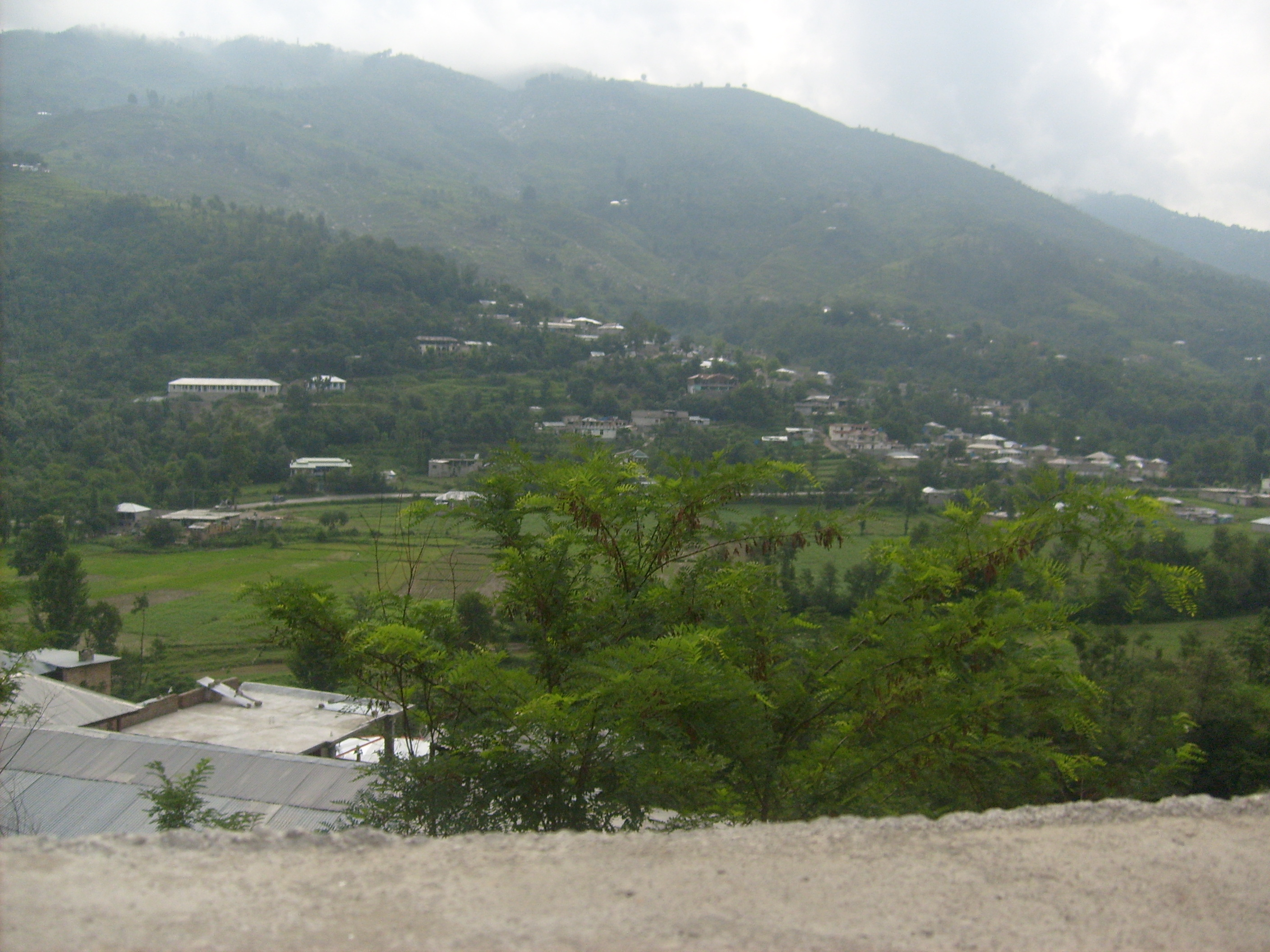
View of Chappargram from Kandar.

== See also ==
- Ajmera
- Battagram District
- Battagram Tehsil
- Yusafzai
- Khyber-Pakhtunkhwa
