= Dherai Bahader Khan =

Human settlement in Pakistan

Dherai Bahader Khan is a small village in Kuza Banda, southern Battagram District, Khyber Pakhtunkhwa province, Pakistan. It is located at 34°38'9.51"N 73° 0'27.98"E, at an altitude of 1218 m, on the Oghi Battagram Road. The town was founded by Zaman Khan, father of Haji Bahader Khan, about 150 years ago. Residents belong to the Torkhel sub-tribe of the Deshan tribe of Swati.

Haji Themas khan is the current chief of the village.

To the south-east of Dherai Bahader Khan is Zaro Dherai, a mountain peak located at 34°38'4.13"N 34°38'4.13"N, with 1428m altitude.
