= Hotal Deshan =

Hotal Deshan ہوتل دیشان Hotal
- Village and Town
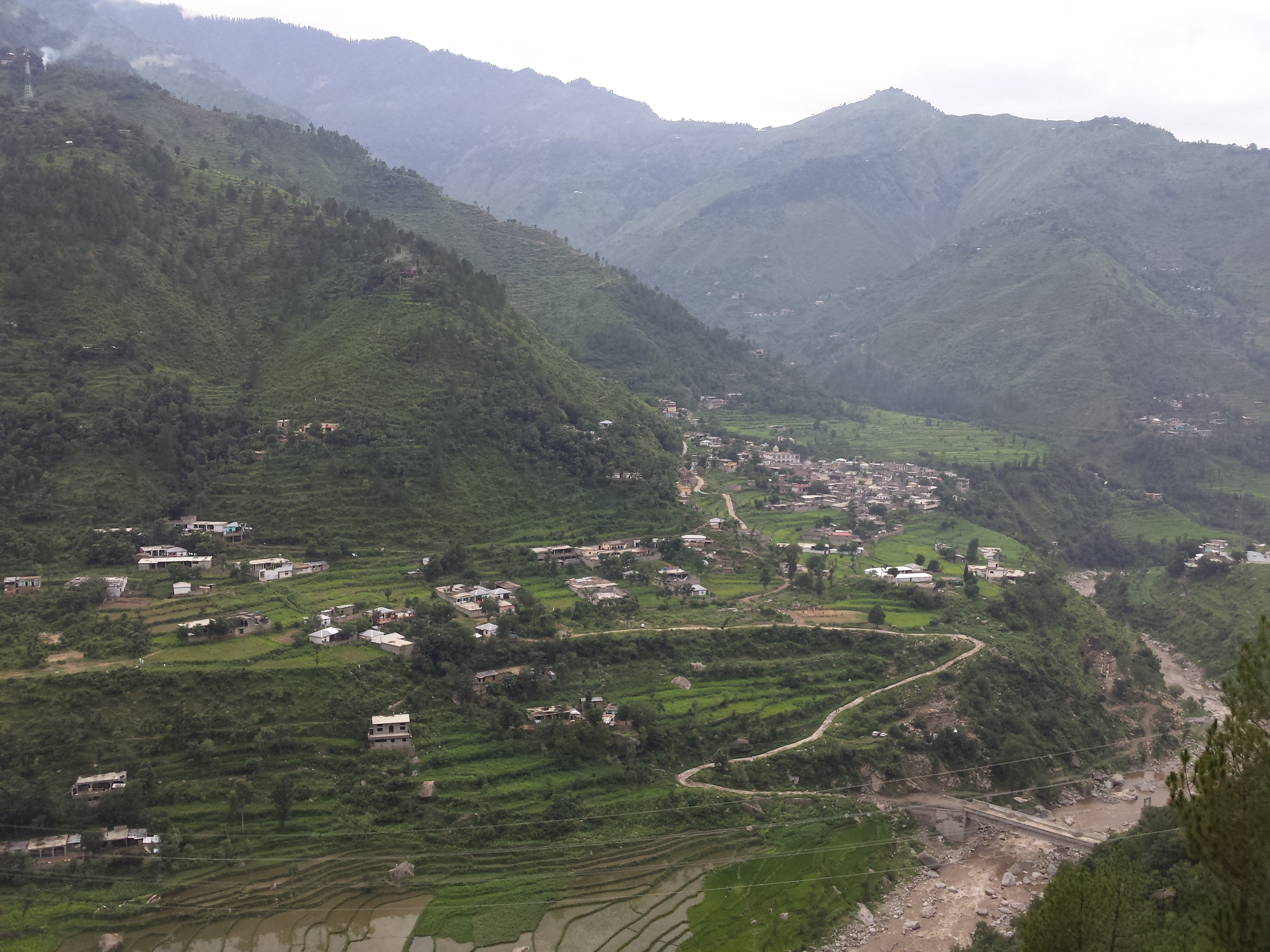

- Location in Pakistan
- Coordinates: 34°43′15.7″N 72°57′22.7″E
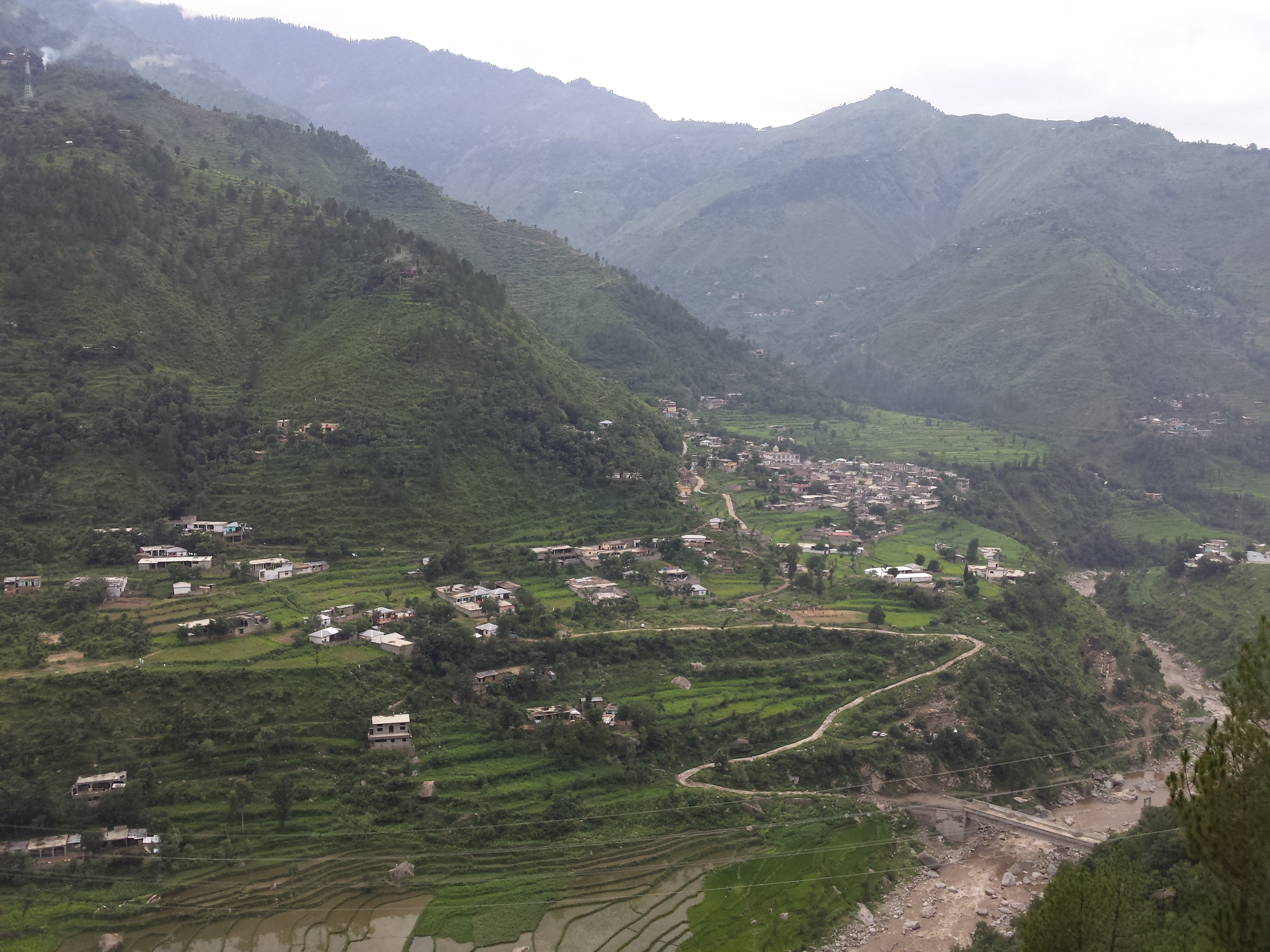
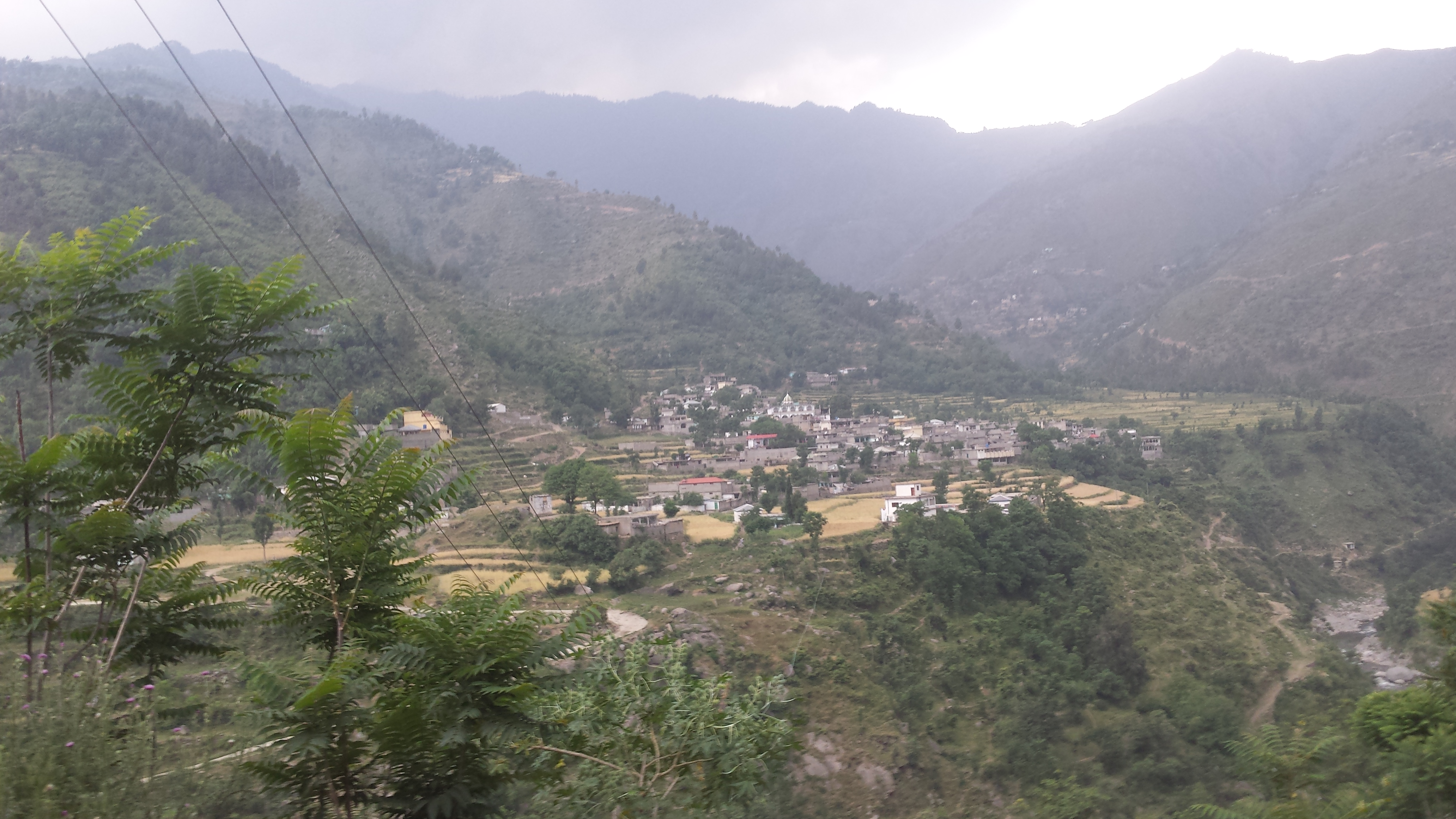
- Battagram khannn7: Pakistan
- Province: Khyber Pakhtunkhwa
- District: Battagram District
- Tehsil: Battagram Tehsil
- Union Council: Peshora
- Post Office: Hotal Deshan
- Time zone: UTC5 (PST)
- Postal Code: 21040
- Area code: 0997

Hotal Deshan is a village of Battagram District in Khyber-Pakhtunkhwa province of Pakistan. It is part of Peshora Union Council and lies within Deshan Aera.

== See also ==
- Battagram District
- Battagram Tehsil
- Deshan
- Khyber-Pakhtunkhwa
