= Deshan =

Deshan may refer to:

== Places ==
- Deshan Township, a township in Fangzheng County, Heilongjiang, China
- Deshan, Changde, an area in Wuling District, Changde, Hunan, China

== People with the name ==
- Deshan Dias (born 1992), Sri Lankan cricketer
- Deshan Fernando (born 1998), Sri Lankan cricketer
- Deshan Withanage (born 1997), Sri Lankan cricketer
- Deshan Xuanjian (780s–865), Chinese Zen Buddhist monk
- Liao Deshan (1866–1923), Chinese educator
- Nipuna Deshan (born 1999), Sri Lankan cricketer

== See also ==
- Deshan Mikitbo, or Matis, an ethnic group of the Amazon
- Hotal Deshan, a village in Pakistan
- Dechamps
- Duchamp (disambiguation)
