= Shingli Bala =

Pakistani village

Shingli Bala Urdu: شنگلی بالا Pashto: شنګلې بالا Bari Shingalo
- Town
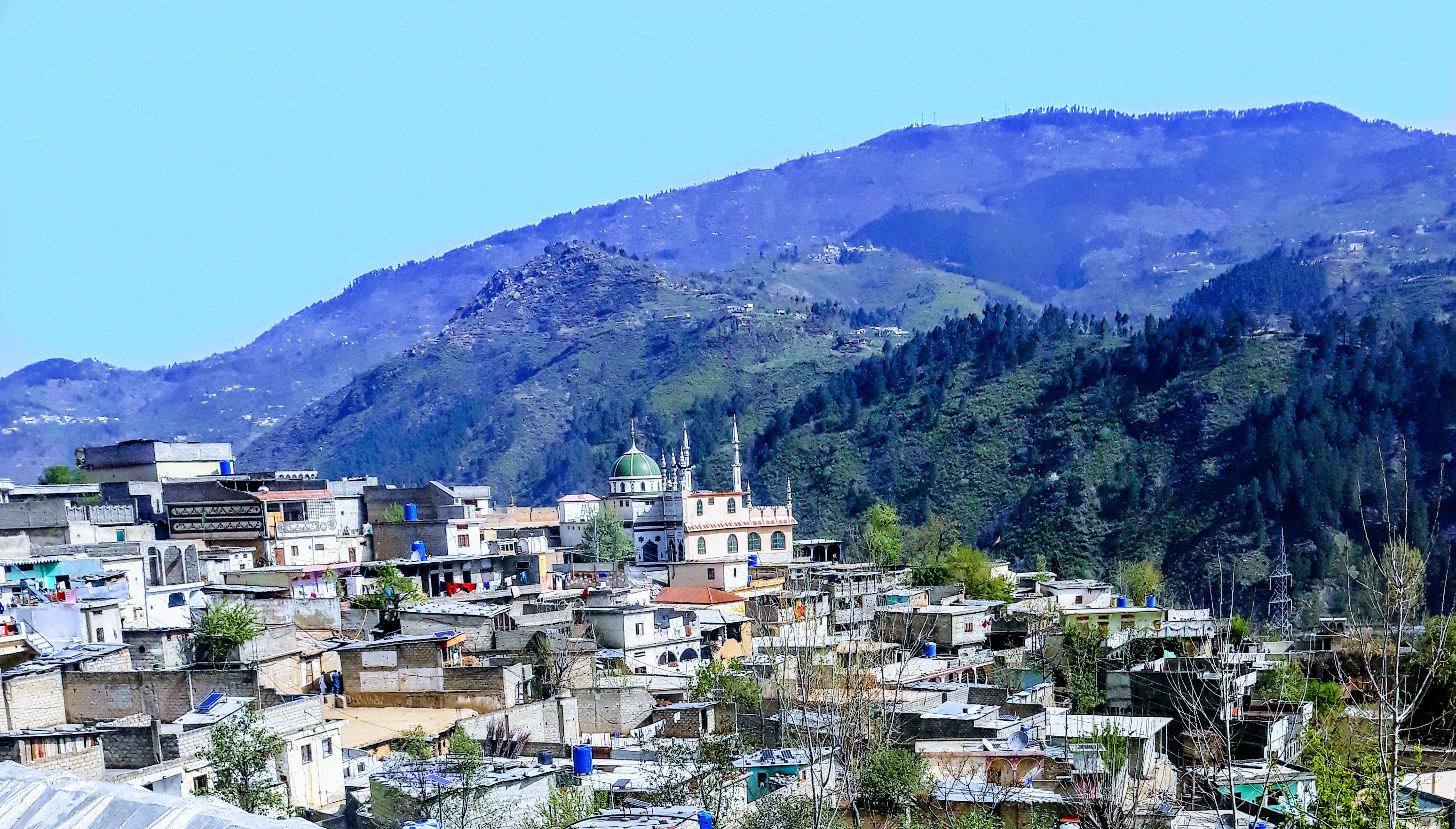
- Shingli Bala, Battagram

- Location in Pakistan
- Coordinates: 34°40′39″N 72°59′04″E
- Country: Pakistan
- Province: Khyber Pakhtunkhwa
- District: Battagram District
- Tehsil: Battagram Tehsil
- Union Council: Gijbori
- Post Office: Shingli bala
- Elevation: 1,010 m (3,310 ft)
- Time zone: UTC5 (PST)
- Area code: 0997

Shingli Bala (Pashto: شنګلې بالا, Urdu: شنگلی بالا) is a village of Battagram District in Khyber-Pakhtunkhwa province of Pakistan. It is part of Gijbori Union Council and lies within Battagram Tehsil and is located about four kilometres from the district headquarters Battagram along the Karakoram Highway(Shahrah-e-Resham) or silk route, and opposite CPEC Bridge at Kas-Pul area. It is a head village of Deshan Territory.

== Geography ==
Shingli Bala is situated approximately 4 kilometers from Battagram city. The village is surrounded by valleys and green mountains, including Ghazikot and Shahnoor. Two rivers, known as Landey and Nandhiar Khwar, flow alongside Shingli Bala.

== Culture ==
The population of Shingli Bala primarily consists of Pashtun people. The culture of Shingli Bala is closely aligned with traditional Pashtun culture. The people hold strong ties to their traditions and customs.

== Demographics ==
350+ houses occupy this village. Shingli bala is a village of Battagram District in Khyber-Pakhtunkhwa province of Pakistan. It is part of Gijbori Union Council and lies within Battagram Tehsil and is located about four kilometres from the district headquarters Battagram along the Karakoram Highway(Shahrah-e-Resham) or silk route.

The people of Shingli Bala belong to multiple families (khel) including Hasham khel (kochilian)+(Akhonzadgan) (biggest family), Rama khel, Masha khel, Raja khel, Mula Khel, Yawgayan, Tor khel, Syedan and Samla khel.

It is a head village of Deshan Territory.

== Gallery ==
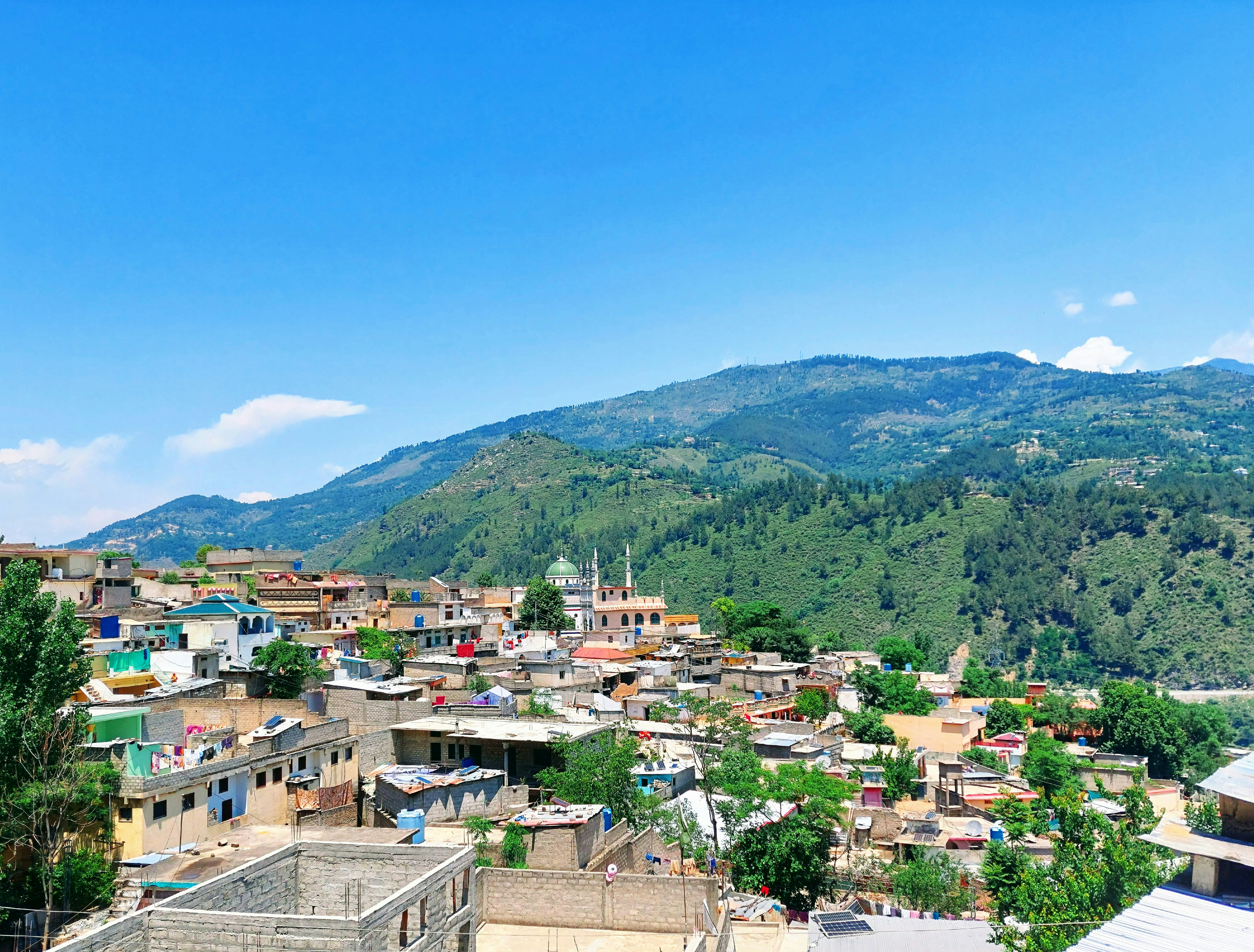
A clean view of Shingli Bala

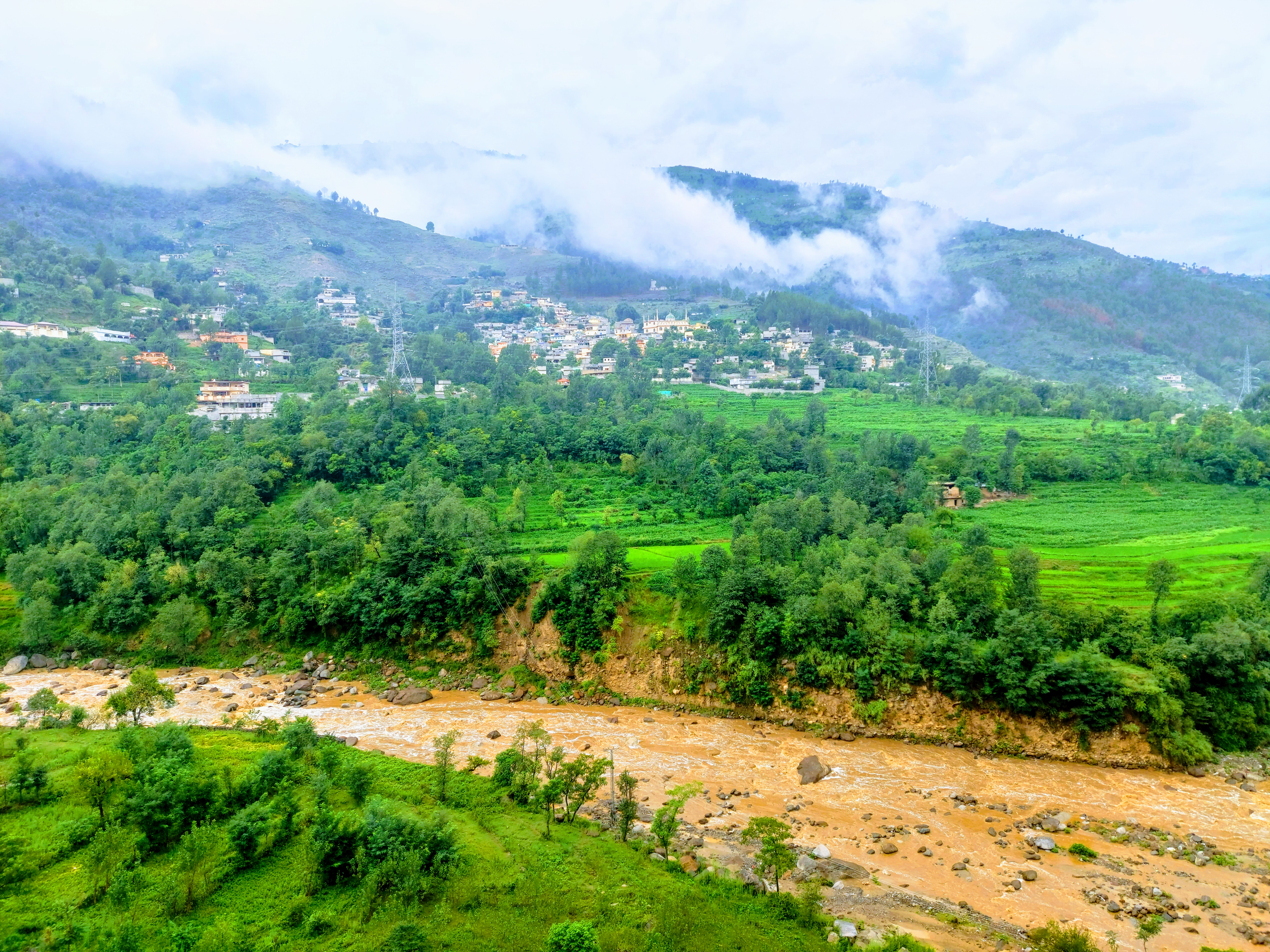
A clean view of Shingli Bala

== See also ==
- Anis Ur Rahman
- Battagram District
- Battagram Tehsil
- Battagram
- Deshiwal
- Gijbori
- Khyber-Pakhtunkhwa
- Pakistan
