= Phagora =

- Village and union council
- Country: Pakistan
- Province: Khyber Pakhtunkhwa
- Elevation: 89 m (292 ft)
- Time zone: UTC+5 (PST)

Phagora is a village of union council Rajdhari in Battagram District, Khyber Pakhtunkhwa along the main silk route or SHAHRA-E-RESHAM. Phagora Village is one of the biggest village in Battagram and is located in mountainous area of Hazara Division. Phagora is 7 km from district headquarters Battagram and 200 km from the capital of Pakistan, Islamabad.

Temperature of the area remains moderate; usually, however, the summer goes up to peak 30 °C sometimes and winter below 10 °C. Although, the village situated at the level where Temperature and Sunshining is most Comfortable for residents and for Fruits trees as compare to the upper mountain and area below from Phagora village

== Demographics ==
Phagora is one of the most populated Pashtun villages and the main tribe living in Phagora is Swatis which are subdivided into three main Khels, Among them are Ghouri Khels [which are subdivided among Banirwal (the oldest and bigger family), Yousuf Khel, Dodi Khel, and Mando Khel], Bhai Khels, and Naral Khels. The fourth is Akhunzadgan which are not a tribe like these three but a bigger tribe from these three. Others are Kalanderkhail, Gujars, Hindkies, Shahikhail, Jewelers/Zargar, Gulabiaan, & Carpenters etc. In the times of Mohammad Ghouri, they came to Swat from Shalman in Afghanistan and defeated the Hindus to establish their rule in that valley. According to a Swati tradition, they ruled Swat and Bajaor for four centuries before the Yousafzais invasion that drove them to Battagram & Mansehra about the end of the 17th century. The main language spoken in Phagora is Pashto.

== Education ==
Pa Gora has an overall poor literacy rate in Battagram district, perhaps there is a crisis of education in the village. Over the years, though this trend has changed as compared to a decade ago people appreciate the education. After the 2005 Earth Quack mind set up of the people is getting changed from labour working, shop running or other earnings means toward education. Now in the village, there are four young PhD doctors graduated from abroad, other are doctors (MBBS), Engineers, Advocates, teachers etc., most of the student are tend to science i.e. medical or engineering while very few think about social sciences. Education facilities in the area are college level. One of the oldest schools is Government Boys Middle school Phagora which is now upgraded as a high school. The private sector has recently initiated schools in the village and two schools are operative in the private sector, however, both are up to the middle level.

Female literacy is worst in the area and this is evident by the fact that the village has not produced any single female educationist, doctor or banker etc. Girls education schools were only up to the primary level until recently one of the school has been upgraded to the Middle level, Majority of the people are reluctant to female education due to their strict ignorant ideology. Though recently basic religious education facilities are established by the locals, it does not provide any modern education. There are also primary schools for boys and girls in the surroundings areas of Phagora. It is tragic that females are deprived of their right to education due to wrong interpretations of religion, though Islam encourages women education. Overall, the literacy rate in the area is extremely poor. Government Degree college Battagram is located within a mile from the village.

== Health facilities ==
Public sector health facility in the area is a Basic Health Unit Phagora located in front of the village. Tertiary healthcare facility for the people is main district headquarters hospital Battagram. Overall public health facilities in the area are extremely poor. The BHU is not sufficient to cater the needs of this thickly populated area. Most people rely on private sector facilities for medical treatment. Many people go to Abbottabad to avail tertiary health facilities and this causes excessive burden on the locals to afford very expensive treatment provided by private outlets.

Due to poor medical regulation in district Battagram, unqualified people are working as illegitimate medical practitioners in the village. The treatment provided by these people have caused many deaths due to wrong treatment, however people of the village hardly know about such practice.

== Infrastructure ==
The infrastructure in the area is extremely poor. The village has been built in an unregulated way. The streets are very narrow and steep and not cemented. The drainage system is extremely poor and usually the drain water is open causing dirty smell in surroundings. There is hardly any easy access to the village through road. Due to thick population of the area it needs to have a chain of roads in the future. The local government is not functional in the area and there are hardly any facilities due to the gross negligence of the government and the lack of people awareness to ask for their rights. The landline telephone services has been shut since 2005 earthquake.

== Economy ==
Overall economic situation of Phagora is not highly appreciable. With growing population, the area is heavily dependent on male out migration for economic purposes. Locals migrate either to industrialized cities in Pakistan to work as labors or to Gulf countries to support their families. Another source of income is local arid agriculture and cattle farming. However, with increasing inflation this does seem a viable long term option for many locals. Some people have successfully set up local business in the village and in the main city of Battagram.

== 2005 earthquake ==
The area was struck by a destructive earthquake of 7.8 magnitudes on October 8, 2005. The main village was badly destroyed as the mud houses could not afford the quake waves and beside some precious human lives and casualties many people were displaced from their homes.
