= Tamai, Pakistan =

Pakistani village

Tamai
- Location within Pakistan
- Coordinates: 34°40′33″N 73°22′55″E
- Country: Pakistan
- Province: Khyber Pakhtunkhwa
- District: Battagram
- Tehsil: Battagram
- Union Council: Ajmera Union Council
- Time zone: UTC+5 (PST)

Tamai is a village in the Khyber Pakhtunkhwa province of Pakistan. It is located at an altitude of 1,276 metres (4,186 ft). The village is part of Ajmera Union Council Union Council in Battagram District.

== Demography ==
According to the 2017 census - the village had a total population of 3,748 - of which 1,863 were male and 1,885 the total number of households was 539 with an average household size of 6.95. The census of 2023 recorded a total population of 4,366 of which 2,222 were male and 2,144 female.
