= Deshani =

Swati Pashton tribe in Pakistan

Deshaan Urdu: دیشان
- Swati
- Location: Battagram
- Religion: Islam
- Surnames: Swati

The Deshiwals, Deshi, Deshani or Deshan (Urdu: دیشان) is a sub-tribe of the Mamylai section of the Swati people residing on the eastern slopes of the Black Mountain of Hazara, had a fighting strength of over 1,000 armed men at the end of the 19th century, who saw action against the British. Deshi or Deshan is the name given to the country to north of Agror, and lying to the west of Nandhiar. It comprises a portion of the eastern slopes of the Black Mountain, a part of the Swati country, wooded spurs with intervening watercourses, on the banks of which are the villages. They are a united tribe, equally among themselves and when external danger threatens. They live in eight major villages, Sarkhaili Banda, Hotal Deshan, Kotgalla, Peshora, Shingli Payeen, Shingli bala, Gijbori, Sofian Torkhail, and in dozens of many small villages like (Karwar, Batley, Banda Akhunzadgan, Char Gali Feroz, Kiargali, Kas-Pul, Shehtoot etc.). They migrated and changed their villages, after every five years (which they called Waish) before 1947. Thus no individual had any land ownership and all the land which they had, was a common wealth. So in case of any external invasion, they fought unitedly for the sake of their territory. The deadly earthquake October 8, 2005 affected this area badly. More than seventy people died and hundred of people injured. Property loss was also in billions. Kotgala and Hotal were the most affected villages.

== Location ==
Deshiwals or Deshan Peoples are living in District. Battagram Khyber Pakhtunkhwa Pakistan.

== Major villages of Deshan ==
- sarkhaili Banda
- Gijbori
- Shingli Bala
- Shingli Payeen
- Peshora
- Kotgalla
- Hotal Deshan
- Sofian torkhail

== Sports ==
The people of Deshan play only two major games, cricket and volleyball, because there are no pacific ground to play more games like football, hockey and more interested games. People also announcements the tournaments or Mela of cricket called Deshan Super League (DSL), and only one team allowed from a village.

== See also ==
- Battagram District
- Battagram
