= Abaseen Division =

Administrative division in Pakistan

- Proposed division
- Country: Pakistan
- Province: Khyber Pakhtunkhwa
- Capital: Battagram (proposed)
- Time zone: UTC+5 (PST)

Abaseen or Abasin Division is a proposed division in Pakistan's Khyber Pakhtunkhwa province, compromising seven districts: Battagram, Allai, Kolai-Palas, Upper Kohistan, Lower Kohistan, Shangla, and Torghar. The area is located on both sides of the Indus River, which is known in Pashto and other local languages as Abaseen.

It is declared that either Battagram, the capital of Battagram District, or Besham, a town at the eastern end of Shangla District, will become the headquarters of Abaseen Division.

== History ==
On 18 June 2011, Abaseen Division was announced by then Chief Minister of Khyber Pakhtunkhwa, Haider Khan Hoti during his speech at a public gathering in Battagram, but it was not approved because of the census. In December 2021, Abaseen Division was approved by Chief Minister Mahmood Khan.

=== Opposition ===
A grand jirga of the elders of Upper Kohistan, Lower Kohistan and Kolai-Palas in December 2021 opposed the move and warned the government against the split of the current Hazara division, and alternatively proposed a separate Kohistan Division compromising the three districts.
