= Government Degree College, Battagram =

College in Khyber Pakhtunkhwa, Pakistan

Coordinates: 34.65083°N 73.305°E

Government Degree College Battagram
- گورنمنٹ ڈگری کالج بٹگرام
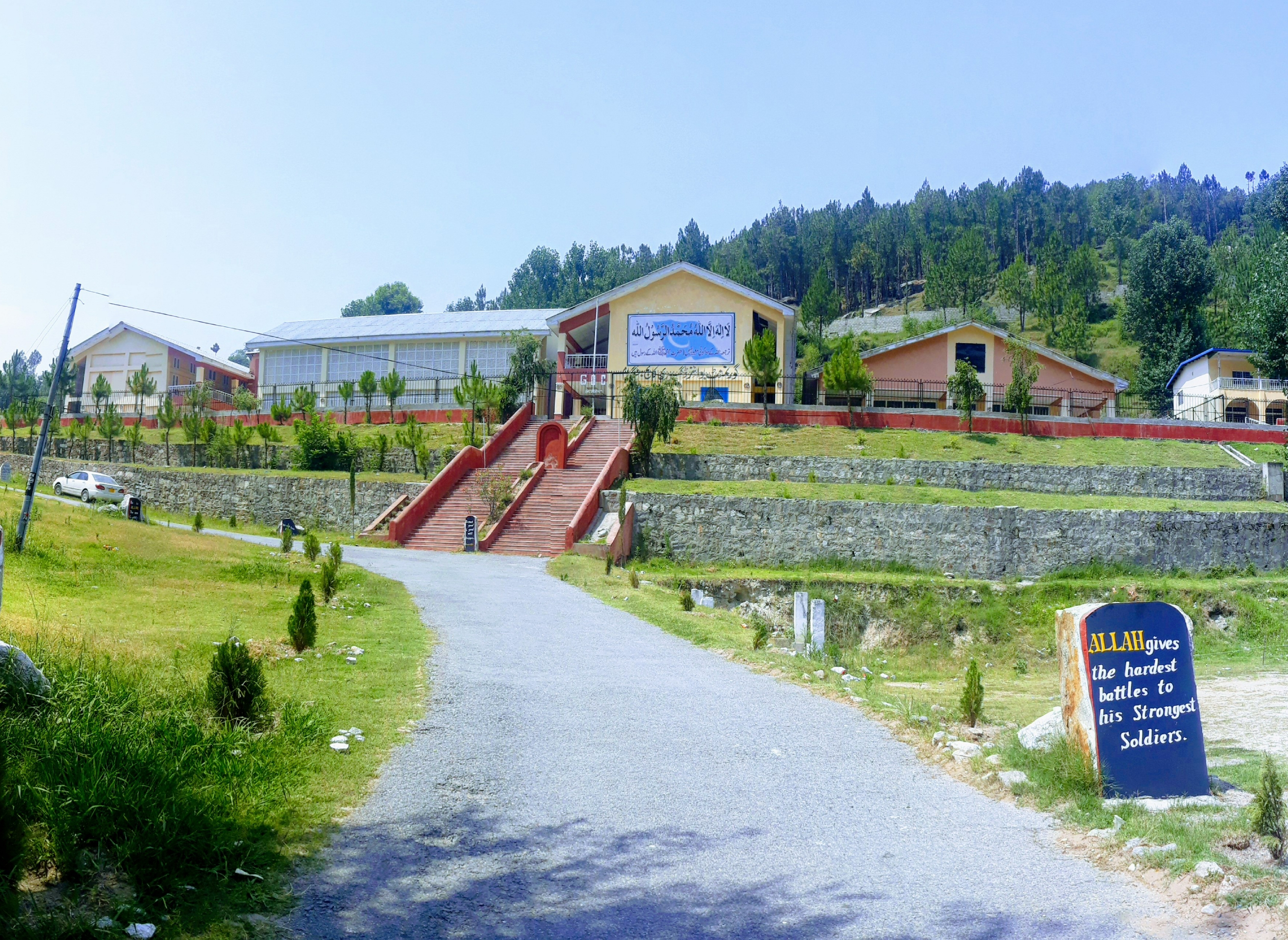
- Other names: GDC Battagram
- Motto: اَلْعِلْمُ قُوَّةٌ
- Motto in English: Knowledge is Power
- Type: Public
- Established: 1999, Upgraded in 2009
- Academic affiliations: Hazara University Mansehra
- Principal: Anwar Beg
- Location: Battagram, Khyber Pakhtunkhwa, Pakistan
- Campus: Rural
- Language: Urdu and English
- Website: www.admission.hed.gkp.pk/college.php?college_id=167

The Government Degree College, Battagram also known as Degree College Battagram is a public sector degree college located in Battagram District of Khyber Pakhtunkhwa in Pakistan. It is affiliated with Hazara University for its degree programs while for its intermediate level programs, it is affiliated with Board of Intermediate and Secondary Education, Abbottabad.

== History ==
Government Degree College Battagram is situated in a valley of Chappargram adjacent to Karakoram Highway (Shahra-e-Resham, Silk Route). It is the only degree college for boys in Battagram District providing education both at Intermediate and degree level in Physical, Biological and Social Sciences. The college was established in 1999. The current campus was built with the assistance of Japan International Cooperation Agency (JICA) in 2009.

== Location ==
The college is located at Chappargram, Battagram, on Karakoram Highway-College Rd at a distance of about three kilometres (1.9 mi) from district headquarter Battagram. It is also located at a distance of about 1 km from the village Chappargram.

== Departments and faculties ==
The college currently have the following departments and faculties.

=== Faculty of Arts ===
- Department of Economics
- Department of Health and Physical Education
- Department of History
- Department of Islamiyat
- Department of Law
- Department of Pashto
- Department of Political Science

=== Faculty of Science ===
- Department of Biology
- Department of Chemistry
- Department of Mathematics
- Department of Physics
- Department of Statistics

== Academic programs ==
The college offers bachelor's degrees in Arts and Science. Besides this it also provides specialisation in subject in both Science and Arts.

=== Intermediate ===
- FA Arts/Humanities (2 Years)
- FSc PreEngineering (2 Years)
- FSc Pre Medical (2 Years)

=== Bachelor courses ===
- Bachelors in Arts
- Bachelors in Science (Medical)
- Bachelors in Science (Engineering)

== See also ==
- Hazara University
- Abbottabad University of Science and Technology
- University of Haripur
- Government Post Graduate College, Mansehra
