= Battagram Tehsil =

Battagram Tehsil تحصیل بٹگرام بټګرام تحصیل Area of Pakhli
- Tehsil
- Location within Pakistan
- Country: Pakistan
- Province: Khyber Pakhtunkhwa
- District: Battagram
- Region: Pakhli
- Union Councils: 12

Government
  - Chairman: Atta Ullah Khan (PTI)

Area
  - Tehsil: 497 km^{2} (192 sq mi)

Population (2023)
  - Tehsil: 335,984
  - Density: 676/km^{2} (1,750/sq mi)
  - Urban: -
  - Rural: 335,984 (100%)

Literacy (2023)
  - Literacy rate: 41.20%
- Time zone: UTC+5 (PST)

Battagram Tehsil is an administrative subdivision (Tehsil) of the Battagram District in the Khyber Pakhtunkhwa province of Pakistan. It serves as the Tehsil headquarters and covers a total area of 300 square miles (780 km^{2}). Battagram Tehsil merged into Pakistan as an administrative region before being raised to the status of a district in 1993. On October 8, 2005, a 7.6 magnitude earthquake in Kashmir badly affected the area.

== Overview and history ==
Battagram Tehsil is surrounded by Allai, Shangla, and Kohistan to the north and the east, and by the Kaghan Valley and Mansehra to the west. It is separated from Allai by a range of mountains rising to over 15,000 feet (4,600 m), and from Mansehra by another range running from the Afghanistan border to the Indus above Thakot. The mountain slopes at the eastern end are forested. The total area of Tehsil Battagram is about 300 square miles (780 km^{2}). Wheat, barley, corn, and rice are grown in the area. Cis-Indus known as the Swatis comprise the dominant tribe. Khan culture is dominant in the Battagram Valley.

Historically, the Swatis of Hazara drove Hindus out of the upper Hazara, and then settled in Mansehra and Battagram. The valley was ruled by Khans (tribal rulers) until they signed the Instrument of Accession with Pakistan in 1949. Battagram Tehsil was later merged into Pakistan in 1971 as an administrative part of the Battagram sub-division. In 1993, Battagram was upgraded to the status of a district and Battagram became one of the Tehsil of Battagram district.

== 2005 earthquake ==
The Battagram (Tehsil) valley was badly affected by the 2005 Kashmir earthquake on October 8, 2005. More than 4,500 people were killed, and approximately 35,000 were seriously injured.

== Administration ==
The city of Battagram serves as the Tehsil headquarters; Tehsil is subdivided into 12 Union Councils:

Union Councils	Union Councils
Ajmera	Banian
Battagram	Batamori
Gijbori	Kuza Banda
Paimal Sharif	Peshora
Rajdahri	Shumlai
Thakot	Trand

== Demographics ==
Historical population
Year	Pop.	±% p.a.
1951	...	—
1961	72,394	—
1972	117,909	+4.53%
1981	204,164	+6.29%
1998	185,626	−0.56%
2017	296,247	+2.49%
2023	335,984	+2.12%

As of the 2023 census, Battagram Tehsil had a population of 335,984. The population of Battagram Tehsil was 296,198, according to the 2017 Pakistan Census.

== People ==
The area is mainly inhabited by Pashto-speaking Pathan tribes, the Swati and Syed. The Pashtun tribes are divided into many sub-tribes, including Khankhel Swati, Ghouri Bhel (most living in Phagora village), Younas Khel, Khadar Khani, Arghoshal Swati, Behram Khel, Raza Khani, Malakal Swati, Mula Khel, Shams Khel, Deshani Swati, Al-Sadatfamilies, Sahibzadgan, and Nikakhel Akhon Khail.

They have fought for the land in the past, but the fighting has ceased for the last decade. The people often solve their problems with Jirga system in villages. People of Battagram do not have any external sources of income and mostly depend upon agriculture.

== See also ==
- Allai Tehsil
- Battagram District
