= Asharban =

- Village Council
- Country: Pakistan
- Region: Khyber Pakhtunkhwa
- District: Battagram District
- Time zone: UTC+5 (PST)

Asharban is a Village Council in Battagram District of Khyber-Pakhtunkhwa.
