= Kotgalla =

Kotgalla Kotgala
- Village and Town
- Country: Pakistan
- Province: Khyber Pakhtunkhwa
- District: Battagram District
- Time zone: UTC+5 (PST)

Kotgala is a village located in Battagram District, Pakistan. It is part of the Peshora union council. The population is approximately 5,000.

Village residents are composed of members of three sub-khels of the Waroji tribe: Khankhel Waroji, Batore Waroji, and Indakhel Waroji. Most of the young people of the village are working abroad. There is one medical doctor in the village, few paramedics and few engineers and teachers. The village is located at about seven kilometers from district headquarters northwards on the silk route. This village was badly affected by the historic earthquake on October 8, 2005. 32 people including women and children lost their life and almost 90 percent homes were destroyed in the quake. There is one primary school for boys in the village, no middle or high schools. Children usually travel to Batagram city for school. The female education facility is quite poor. There is only one female school that lacks specific building and is conducted in one of local houses. All most all female students couldn’t complete their primary education due serious lack of facilities and teaching staff.

The village is surrounded by mountains and two fresh water rivers.

Crops cultivated here are rice, maze and various types of vegetables.

Map of Kotgala
