= PK-35 Battagram-II =

Pakistani electoral district

- Constituency for the Khyber Pakhtunkhwa Assembly
- Region: Battagram Tehsil (partly) of Battagram District

Current constituency
- Party: Pakistan Tehreek-e-Insaf
- Member(s): Taj Muhammad Swati (3rd time)
- Created from: PK-59 Batagram-I (2002-2018) PK-29 Battagram-II (2018-2023)

PK-35 Battagram-II (پی کے-35 بٹگرام-2) is a constituency for the Khyber Pakhtunkhwa Assembly of the Khyber Pakhtunkhwa province of Pakistan.

== See also ==
- PK-34 Battagram-I
- PK-36 Mansehra-I
