= Hutel Batkol =

- Union council
- Country: Pakistan
- Region: Khyber Pakhtunkhwa
- District: Battagram District
- Time zone: UTC+5 (PST)

Hutel Batkol is a Union council in Battagram District of Khyber-Pakhtunkhwa.
