= Bojri =

- Village Council
- Country: Pakistan
- Region: Khyber-Pakhtunkhwa
- District: Battagram District
- Time zone: UTC+5 (PST)

Bojri is a Village Council in Battagram District of Khyber-Pakhtunkhwa.
