= Taj Muhammad (politician) =

Pakistani politician

Taj Muhammad Khan Trand
- تاج محمد خان ترند

Advisor to Chief Minister of Khyber Pakhtunkhwa for Sports and Youth Affairs
- Incumbent
- Assumed office 31 October 2025

Member of the Provincial Assembly of Khyber Pakhtunkhwa
- Incumbent
- Assumed office 29 February 2024
- Constituency: PK-35 Battagram-II
- In office 13 August 2018 – 22 January 2023
- Constituency: PK-35 Battagram-II

Personal details
- Party: PTI (2018-present)
- Other political affiliations: IND (2008-2018)
- Parent: Muhammad Yousaf Khan Trand
- Occupation: Politician
- Nickname: Tajya Khan

Taj Muhammad Khan Swati is a Pakistani politician who is a member of the Provincial Assembly of Khyber Pakhtunkhwa for the third time. He is son of Haji Muhammad Yousaf Khan, who currently holds the title of being the tribal ruler of Trand area and head of political alliance named "Trand Group". His father remained member of Provincial Assembly for the 8 times and also served as Provincial Minister.

He belongs to the Ashlor family of the Mamyali subsection of Swati tribe.

== Political career ==
Khan served as the tehsil nazim (Mayor) of Battagram Tehsil from 2001 to 2005. During his mayoral period he administered the tehsil well and oversaw a number of development projects.

He was elected for the first time to the NWFP assembly for Constituency PF-59 (Battagram-I) in the Pakistani general election 2008 on an independent seat and defeated the JUI-F candidate.

Khan context election 2013 but was unsuccessful to Nawabzada Wali Muhammad Khan a renowned member of rival Group Knowns as Battagram Group.

He was re-elected to the Provincial Assembly of Khyber Pakhtunkhwa as a candidate of Pakistan Tehreek-e-Insaf from Constituency PK-29 (Battagram-II) in the 2018 Pakistani general election.

In the 2024 general election, he was re-elected as Member of the Provincial Assembly (MPA) for third time from PK 35 Battagram-II.
