= Government Post Graduate College, Mansehra =

Pakistani college

Coordinates: 34°21′58.3″N 73°12′50.4″E

- Address: Mansehra, Pakistan
- Type: Public Sector
- Established: 1958
- Location: Mansehra, Pakistan
- Website: Official Website

Government Post Graduate College (GPGC), Mansehra is public sector college located in Mansehra of Khyber Pakhtunkhwa in Pakistan. The college offers programs for intermediate level both in Arts and Science groups for which it is affiliated with Board of Intermediate and Secondary Education Abbottabad. The college also offers 4 years BS programs in various disciplines for which it is affiliated with Hazara University.

== Overview and history ==
Government Post Graduate College, Mansehra is situated at Mansehra city. It was started as Intermediate college in 1958 in a small building. It became degree college in 1973 while it was upgraded to Postgraduate college in 1989. In 2010, GPGC Mansehra started 4 Years BS Programs in 6 science subjects; Physics, Chemistry, Botany, Statistics, Zoology and Maths and 6 social science subjects; English, Urdu, Islamic Studies, Pakistan Studies, Political Science, and Economics.

== See also ==
- Hazara University
- Government Degree College, Battagram
