= Ajmera Union Council =

Ajmera Urdu: اجمیرہ Pashto: اجمیرہ
- Union council
- Location in Pakistan
- Country: Pakistan
- Region: Khyber Pakhtunkhwa
- District: Battagram District
- Time zone: UTC+5 (PST)

Ajmera (Urdu, Pashto: اجميره) is a Union Council of Battagram District in Khyber Pakhtunkhwa Province of Pakistan.

== Administration ==
The Union Council of Ajmera is composed of small villages, including Noshera, Matta, Maidan, Chapargram, Tamai and the town of Ajmera after which it is named.
