= Duchamp (disambiguation) =

Marcel Duchamp was a French American artist whose work is most often associated with the Dadaist and Surrealist movements.

Duchamp may also refer to:

- Duchamp (clothing), a London-based luxury clothing company
- Duchamp (surname), a surname
