= 2023 Battagram cable car incident =

Cable car incident in Pakistan

- Still from drone footage of the cable car
- Date: 22 August 2023
- Duration: 14 hours
- Location: Battagram, Khyber Pakhtunkhwa, Pakistan
- Cause: Cable snap
- Participants: 6 children and 2 adults
- Outcome: All passengers rescued

On 22 August 2023, in the Allai valley near the city of Battagram in the Khyber Pakhtunkhwa province of Pakistan, a cable car used by local residents for daily commuting to school became the centre of a rescue operation after one of its cables snapped, leaving six children and two adults stranded approximately 274 meters (900 feet) above the ground. All individuals were later rescued that day.

== Background ==
The cable car was a chair lift, similar to many others used in the Khyber Pakhtunkhwa province of Pakistan. It was a vital mode of transportation for residents of the region. It drastically reduced the travel time between a village and the local school from a two-hour road journey to a four-minute ride on the cable car.

The cable car was built by a local resident with permission from the city administration. Such makeshift arrangements are common in mountainous regions of Pakistan. While this particular cable car had no previous issues, there have been widespread issues regarding makeshift cable cars in Pakistan, which have led to injury and deaths.

== Incident ==
The incident unfolded at around 07:00 local time (02:00 GMT) when one or more of the cables supporting the chair-lift gave way, causing it to hang precariously by only one cable. This situation left the passengers in a state of distress and dire need of rescue. Among the stranded passengers was a 16-year-old boy with a heart condition who lost consciousness for several hours. His condition added an urgency to the rescue efforts.

== Rescue efforts ==
The rescue efforts faced several challenges. Strong winds in the region and concerns about the helicopter's rotor blades potentially destabilising the chair-lift complicated the mission. Local residents who spotted the stranded cable car used loudspeakers to alert authorities, prompting the initiation of the rescue mission. Anxious crowds gathered on both sides of the valley to watch the unfolding rescue operation, including supplies being given. Parents of the trapped children anxiously waited at the site.

After a risk assessment, the plan was to airlift the individuals. Military helicopters arrived to rescue the stranded individuals. Up to four military helicopters were used after initial attempts to fix the faults were unsuccessful. Two children were airlift rescued, but as night approached, the helicopters had to land. Other rescue methods were deployed. Muhammad Ali Swati, a person with zipline expertise and Sahib Khan, a local known as the "sky pirate" used their expertise and equipment to move the remaining children and the two adults along the cable car cable to the ground.

Later that day, Pakistan's caretaker prime minister Anwaar ul Haq Kakar announced that everyone had been rescued.
