= Battagram =

City in Khyber Pakhtunkhwa, Pakistan

Battagram بٹگرام بټګرام Batgram
- City and Tehsil
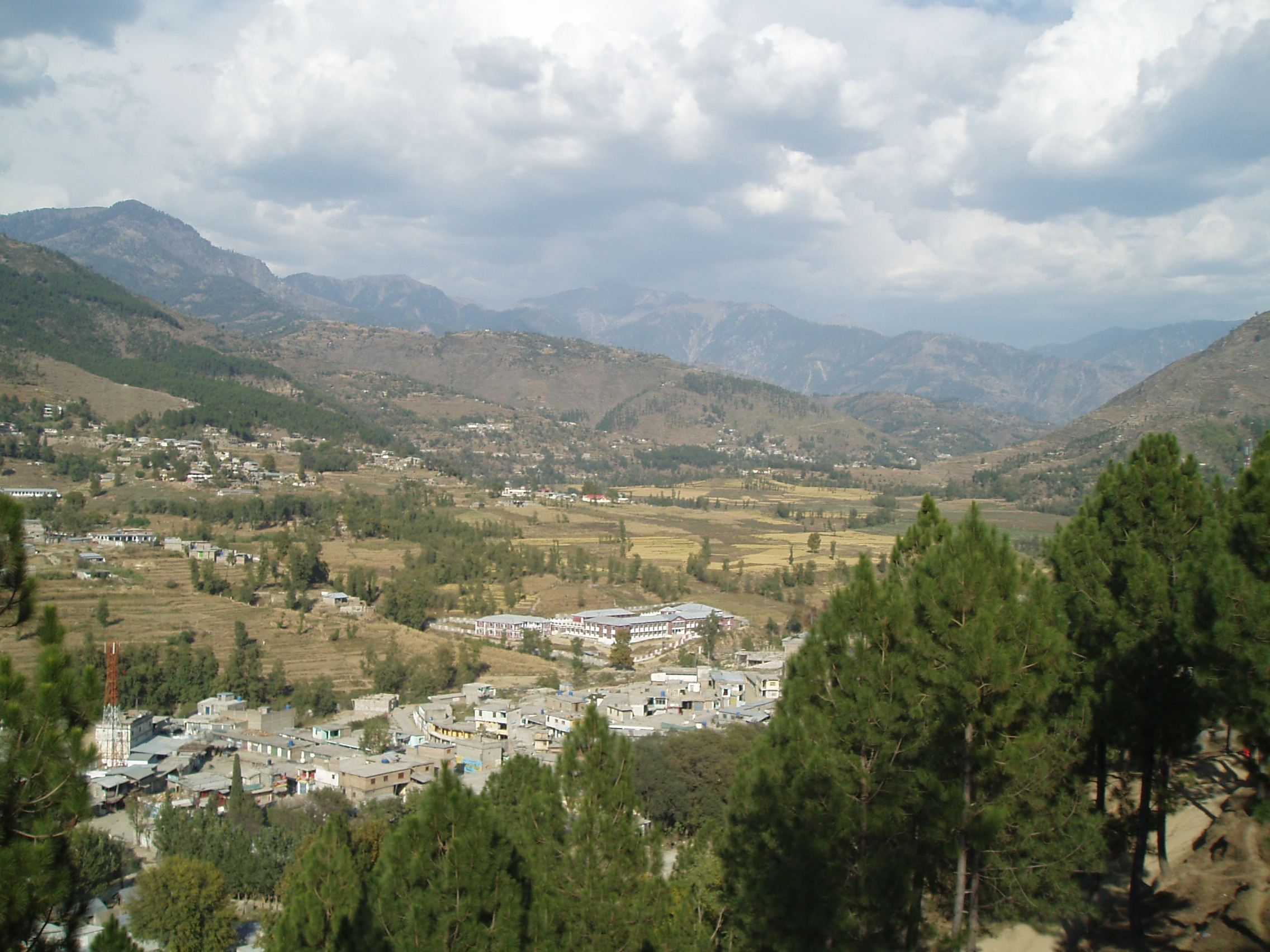

- Location within Pakistan
- Coordinates: 34°41′N 73°1′E
- Country: Pakistan
- Province: Khyber Pakhtunkhwa
- District: Battagram
- Elevation: 1,038 m (3,406 ft)

Population (2017)
  - Total: 27,083
- Postal code: 21040

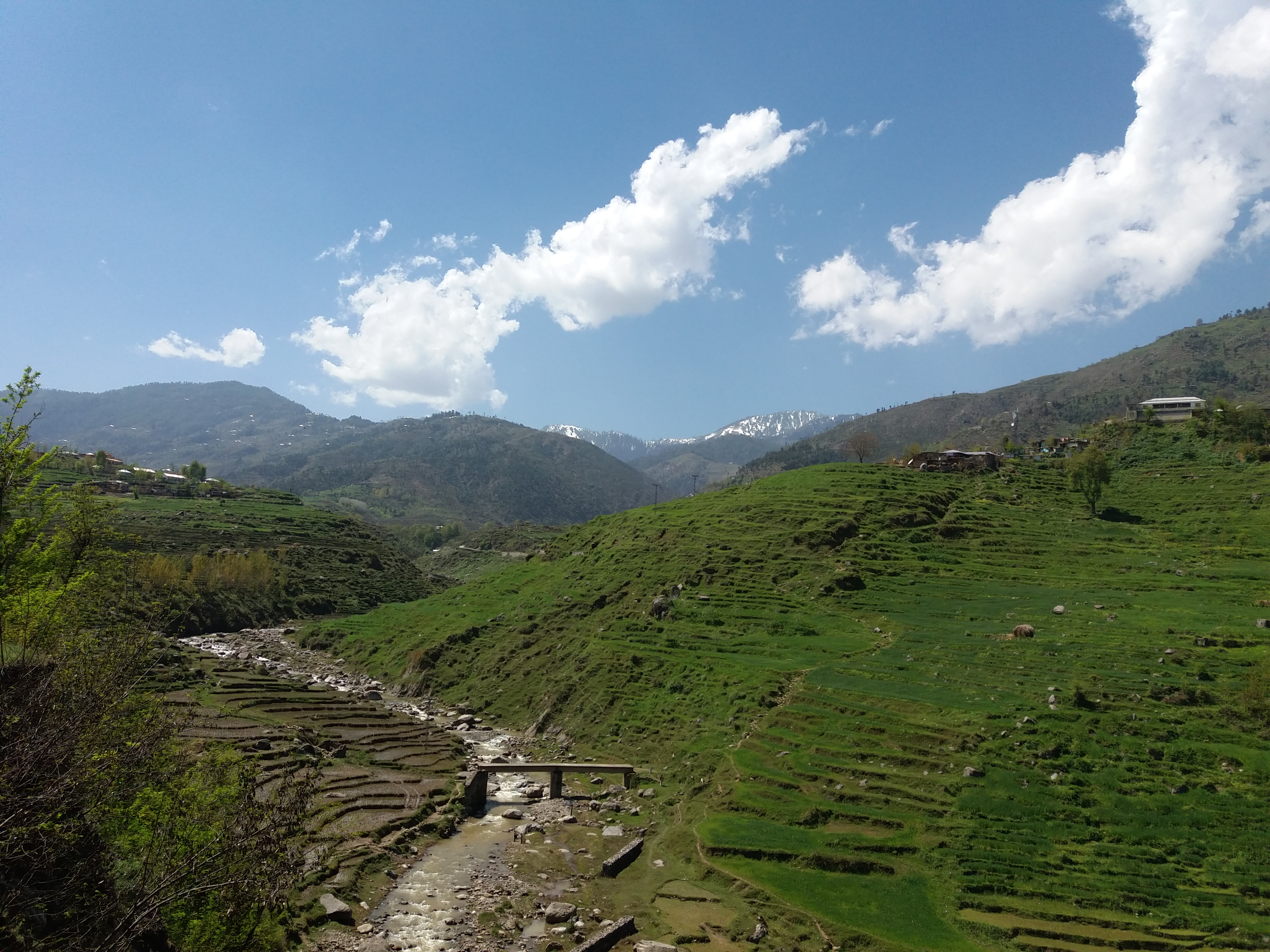
Picture has been shot in Battagram, kuzabanda, Pakistan.

Battagram (Urdu: بٹگرام, Pashto: بټګرام) is a city and Union Council of Battagram District in Khyber Pakhtunkhwa Province of Pakistan. It is located at 34°41'N 73°1'E and has an altitude of 1038 metres (3408 feet).

== Climate ==
With a mild and generally warm and temperate climate, Battagram features a humid subtropical climate (Cfa) under the Köppen climate classification. The average temperature in Battagram is 18.5 °C or 65.3 °F, while the annual precipitation averages 1,427 millimetres or 56.18 inches.

June is the hottest month of the year with an average temperature of 27.9 °C or 82.2 °F. The coldest month, January, has an average temperature of 7.6 °C or 45.7 °F.

Climate data for Battagram
Month	Jan	Feb	Mar	Apr	May	Jun	Jul	Aug	Sep	Oct	Nov	Dec	Year
Mean daily maximum °C (°F)	12.8 (55.0)	14.8 (58.6)	19.6 (67.3)	24.6 (76.3)	30.0 (86.0)	35.1 (95.2)	33.3 (91.9)	31.5 (88.7)	30.6 (87.1)	27.0 (80.6)	21.6 (70.9)	15.2 (59.4)	24.7 (76.4)
Daily mean °C (°F)	7.6 (45.7)	9.4 (48.9)	13.8 (56.8)	18.5 (65.3)	23.1 (73.6)	27.9 (82.2)	27.2 (81.0)	26.0 (78.8)	24.4 (75.9)	19.8 (67.6)	14.7 (58.5)	9.5 (49.1)	18.5 (65.3)
Mean daily minimum °C (°F)	2.4 (36.3)	4.1 (39.4)	8.0 (46.4)	12.4 (54.3)	16.3 (61.3)	20.8 (69.4)	21.2 (70.2)	20.5 (68.9)	17.8 (64.0)	12.7 (54.9)	7.8 (46.0)	3.8 (38.8)	12.3 (54.2)
Average precipitation mm (inches)	128 (5.0)	205 (8.1)	231 (9.1)	148 (5.8)	71 (2.8)	51 (2.0)	192 (7.6)	163 (6.4)	61 (2.4)	39 (1.5)	57 (2.2)	81 (3.2)	1,427 (56.1)
Average precipitation days	7	9	10	9	8	7	17	16	7	4	4	5	103
Source: Climate-Data.org

== Education ==
Schools of Battagram	Location	Colleges of Battagram	Location		
Government Centennial Model High School, Battagram	near DHQ Hospital Battagram	Government Degree College, Battagram	Opposite Karakoram Highway (KKH N35), Chappargram.		
Young Muslim Public School and College, Battagram	Boys Branch located near Police Station, Ajmera.	Sir Sayed institute of learning (SILM) school and College, Battagram	Boys Branch located near jahil mord , Girls Branch located near Wapda Office, Battagram	Young Muslim Public School & College, Battagram	Boys Branch located near Police Station, Battagram. Girls Branch located near Wapda Office, Battagram
Al Syed Garden Public School and College, Battagram	Near Vagon Adda, Ajmera	Sir Syed Institute of Learning & Motivation, Battagram	Near Sub-Jail Battagram		
Al-Ezzah Academy, Battagram	Karakoram highway, near Tamai road, Ajmera	Zahid Public High School & College, Battagram	Banya Road, Kuzabanda Mira		
The Rising Star Public School, Battagram	N/A	Sky Hawk International Public School & College, Battagram	Near PSO Petrol Pump, Battagram.		
Pace Institute of I.T Battagram	Oppt. TMA Office, near Ajmera Road, United Market Battagram				

The schools are being built with the help of several NGOs and foreign funds to improve the literacy rate of the people.

== 2005 earthquake ==
Battagram was among the areas affected by the earthquake of 8 October 2005, where more than 4,500 people were killed and approximately 35,000 were injured.

== Administration ==
Battagram District is divided into two tehsils, the proper Battagram and Allai (which are Banna, Bateela, Batkul, Biari, Jambera, Pashto, Rashang and Sakargah). Proper Battagram main city is a tehsil and district headquarters and is also one of 20 Union Councils of the District of Battagram.

The Battagram Tehsil is subdivided into 12 Union Councils:

Union Councils	Union Councils
Ajmera	Banian
Battagram	Batamori
Gijbori	Kuza Banda
Paimal Sharif	Peshora
Rajdahri	Shumlai
Thakot	Trand

== See also ==
- 2023 Battagram cable car incident
- Battagram Tehsil
