= Thakot =

Thakot تاکوټ، تھاکوٹ
- Town and union council
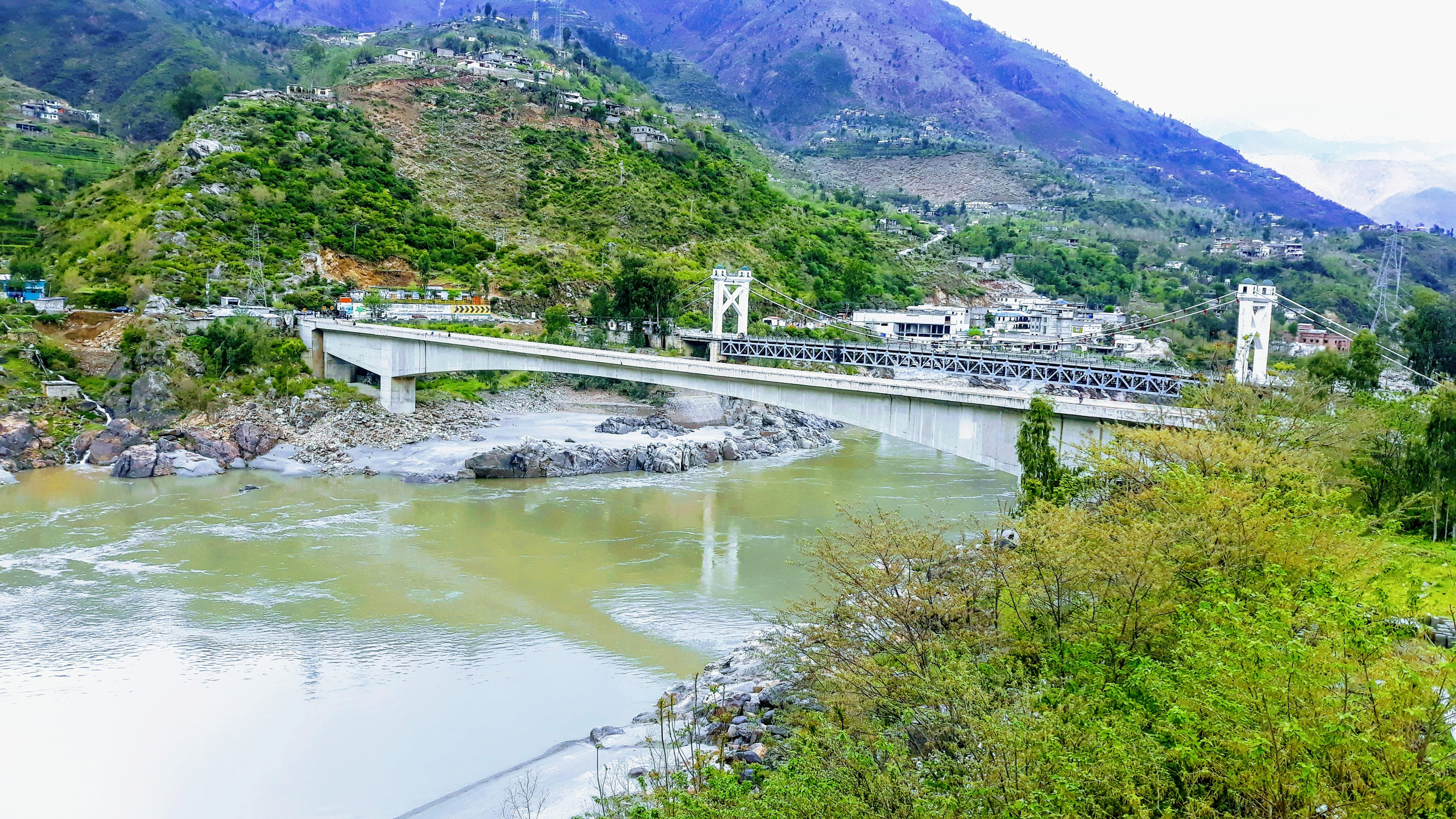
- Indus River Thakot in 2019

- Location in Pakistan
- Coordinates: 34°45′N 72°55′E
- Country: Pakistan
- Province: Khyber Pakhtunkhwa
- District: Battagram District
- Region: Upper Pakhli
- Elevation: 536 m (1,759 ft)
- Time zone: UTC+5 (PST)

Thakot or Takot (Urdu: تھاکوٹ; Pashto: تاکوټ) is a town on the Indus River in Battagram District of Khyber Pakhtunkhwa, Pakistan. It is also one of twenty Union Councils of Battagram District, and one of twelve in Battagram Tehsil. Thakot is located midway between Battagram town in the south and Besham town (Shangla District) in the north, at a distance of about 30 km from both .

== History ==
Thakot is a tribal town historically ruled by Khans. The "Khans of Thakot" also known as "Chiefs of Thakot tribal state" belongs to the powerful Arghushal family of the influential Swati tribe. A large number of people from Battagram district came and wore the turban of being a Khan to each of Chief of Thakot throughout the history.

The Khan family speaks Pashto as their only mother tongue. Khan Abdul Qadir Khan Arghushal was the initially "Malak of Daot" but later took over his first cousin’s Khanate of Thakot. During the tenure of Khan Bradar Khan Arghushal, the state was expanded till 43 village councils of the present Battagram District and Shangla District. The Khans of Paimal Sharif and Khans of Shamrad also belongs to same family.

A long-standing dispute existed between Bradar Khan of Thakot and the Wali of Swat over the recovery of timber tolls on the Indus River. In 1924, the Wali of Swat seized Bradar Khan's estate on the right bank of the Indus. The following year, Bradar Khan Swati was ousted from Thakot by the other Swati Chiefs including the Khans of Allai and Khans of Nandihar, supported by the Wali of Swat. Bradar Khan subsequently appealed to the Government for the restoration of Thakot. In response, orders were issued prohibiting the Wali of Swat from interfering on the left bank of the Indus and Bradar Khan from interfering on the right bank.

In 1925, the Wali of Swat and his commander Abdul Qadus Khan of Khwaza Khela, again dispatched a force of 3,000 men to invade Thakot. However, Bradar Khan Arghushal resisted the incursion and firmly refused to accept any demands from the Wali of Swat.

The Arghushal Khanans of Thakot are the only feudal family in Hazara to have historically owned lands on both banks of the Indus River, extending into Shangla District along with their Summer seat in Battagram District.

- Ruler I: Shah Zotai Khan Arghushal Swati of Dhodial (1703-1710)
- Ruler II: Shah Dara Khan Arghushal (1710-1732) bin Zotai Khan
- Ruler III: Shah Ghazi Khan Arghushal (1732-1758) bin Dara Shah
- Ruler IV: Shah Madam Khan Arghushal (1758-1793) bin Shah Ghazi
- Ruler V: Malak Ahmed Khan Arghushal (1793-1820s) bin Madam Khan
- Ruler VI: Malak Hamza Ullah Khan Arghushal (1820s - 1850s) bin Ahmed Khan
- Ruler VII: Malak Samundar Khan Arghushal (Nominal ruler) bin Hamza Ullah Khan
- Ruler VIII: Malak Abdul Qadir Khan Arghushal (1850s-1890s)
- Ruler IX: Khan Baradar Khan Arghushal (1890s-1930s) bin Abdul Qadir Khan
- Ruler X: Jan Muhammad Khan Arghushal (1930- 1977) bin Baradar Khan
- Ruler XI: Aurangzeb Khan Arghushal (1977- 2002) bin Jan Muhammad Khan
- Ruler XII + Political Founder Leader: Alam Zeb Khan Arghushal (2002- 2022) bin Jan Muhammad Khan
- Ruler XIII: Yaqoob Khan Arghushal (2022 - present)

● Political leader : Bakht Nawaz Khan Arghushal (2022 -Present) bin Alam Zeb Khan

== Climate ==
With a mild and generally warm and temperate climate, Thakot features a humid subtropical climate (Cfa) under the Köppen climate classification. The average temperature in Thakot is 21.1 °C, while the annual precipitation averages 896 mm. Even in the driest months, there is a lot of precipitation. November is the driest month with 19 mm of precipitation, while August, the wettest month, has an average precipitation of 157 mm.

June is the hottest month of the year with an average temperature of 31.1 °C. The coldest month January has an average temperature of 9.5 °C.

Climate data for Thakot
Month	Jan	Feb	Mar	Apr	May	Jun	Jul	Aug	Sep	Oct	Nov	Dec	Year
Mean daily maximum °C (°F)	15.7 (60.3)	18.2 (64.8)	23.2 (73.8)	28.3 (82.9)	33.9 (93.0)	39.1 (102.4)	37.1 (98.8)	35.3 (95.5)	34.0 (93.2)	30.2 (86.4)	24.2 (75.6)	17.9 (64.2)	28.1 (82.6)
Daily mean °C (°F)	9.5 (49.1)	12.0 (53.6)	16.6 (61.9)	21.4 (70.5)	26.3 (79.3)	31.3 (88.3)	30.7 (87.3)	29.3 (84.7)	27.1 (80.8)	22.1 (71.8)	16.2 (61.2)	11.1 (52.0)	21.1 (70.0)
Mean daily minimum °C (°F)	3.3 (37.9)	5.9 (42.6)	10.0 (50.0)	14.5 (58.1)	18.8 (65.8)	23.5 (74.3)	24.3 (75.7)	23.4 (74.1)	20.3 (68.5)	14.1 (57.4)	8.3 (46.9)	4.4 (39.9)	14.2 (57.6)
Source: Climate-Data.org

== Demography ==
Most of the people living here belong to the Swati tribe. Mangian families also live in Thakot. The people of Thakot speak Pashto natively as well as Urdu but the educated people also know English.

== Hydro ==
The Water and Power Development Authority (WAPDA) is building 2,800 MW Hydel Power Project Thakot at an estimated cost of $5 billion. The Pakistan government has proposed Russian cooperation in the project.
