= Gijbori =

Gijbori Urdu: گجبوڑی Pashto: ګجبوړۍ Gijborai
- Village and union council
- Location in Pakistan
- Coordinates: 34°39′04″N 72°59′20″E
- Country: Pakistan
- Province: Khyber Pakhtunkhwa
- District: Battagram District
- Tehsil: Battagram Tehsil
- Village: Gijbori
- Elevation: 1,090 m (3,580 ft)

Population
  - Total: 15,000
  - Density: 402/km^{2} (1,040/sq mi)
- Time zone: UTC+5 (PST)
- Zip Code: 21061
- Area code: 0997

Gijbori is a town, and one of twenty union councils of Battagram District in Khyber Pakhtunkhwa province of Pakistan. Also a part and a big village of Deshan Territory. It comprises many small villages. These include Sarkhali Banda is head village of this union council Torkhail clan is living here and this clan take important role in politics of this union council and also of all district.

Head Villages;

- Sarkhali Banda,
- Shingli Bala,
- Banda Akhunzadgan,
- Kiargali Feroz Khan,
- Karwar,
- Kiargali Latif Khan
- Malkot,
- Kass
- Kandi, Dehree, Barpaw and Kuzpaw are the subvillages of Gijbori.

It is located at 34°39'04N 72°59'20E and has an altitude of 1090 metres (3488 feet).
