= Battagram Valley =

Valley in Khyber Pakhtunkhwa, Pakistan

Battagram Valley is a valley in Battagram District, which is located in Khyber Pakhtunkhwa, formerly known as North-West Frontier Province, northern Pakistan.
