= Duchamp (clothing) =

British men's clothing and accessories company founded in 1989

Duchamp Holdings Limited
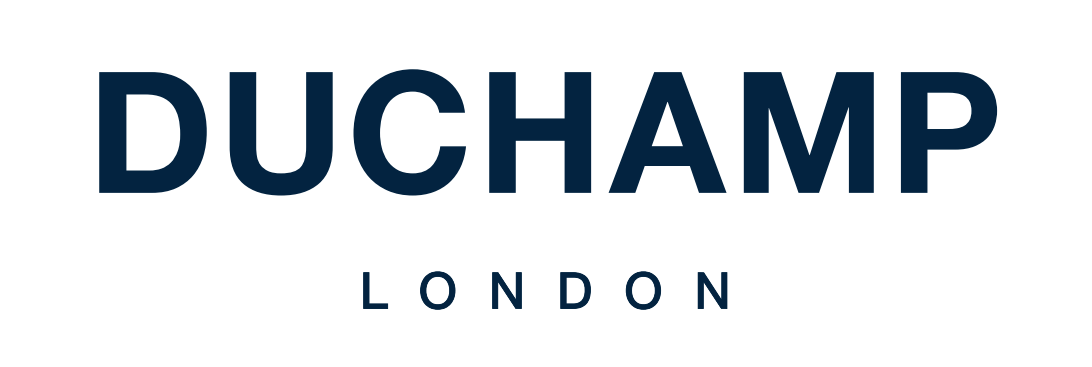
- Type: Private
- Industry: Fashion
- Founded: Suffolk, United Kingdom (1989)
- Headquarters: London, United Kingdom
- Products: Men's Clothing; Accessories
- Website: duchamplondon.com

Duchamp is a British men's luxury clothing and accessories company founded in 1989.

== History ==
The company was founded in 1989 by Mitchell Jacobs, a former buyer at Browns. The company was named after the French artist Marcel Duchamp with the following claim by Jacobs : "Duchamp turned everyday objects into art and I turned everyday icons of men's fashion into wearable art". Duchamp initially specialised in cufflinks and branched in 1992 into ties, with characteristic bold colours and "futuristic" designs. Jacobs established a wholesale trade and opened in 1998 a small boutique in Notting Hill In 2006, when the founder sold the company to its management and the private-equity fund Kcaj LLP, Marc Psarolis became part-owner and chief executive. The same year, the company opened a 750-square-foot (70 m^{2}) store on Regent Street and introduced a line of shirts. In 2011, the company claimed to sell "more than 60,000 ties a year [...] as well as cufflinks, suits, jackets, socks and shirts".

== Stores ==
=== United Kingdom ===
- Jermyn Street, London
