= Banian, Battagram =

Coordinates: 34°36′30″N 73°3′15″E

Banian, Khyber Pukhtunkhwa
- Town and union council
- Interactive map of Banian, Khyber Pukhtunkhwa
- Country: Pakistan
- Region: Khyber Pukhtunkhwa
- District: Battagram District
- Tehsil: Battagram

Government
- Elevation: 1,496 m (4,908 ft)
- Time zone: UTC+5 (PST)

Banian (Urdu: بانیاں), (Pashto: بانیاں) is a town, and one of the twenty union councils of Battagram District in the Khyber Pukhtunkhwa of Pakistan. The place was named by Bania (caste) of Narrore, while they formerly ruled the Jirgah System Kingdom for centuries. It is located at 34°36'30N 73°3'15E and has an altitude of 1497 metres (4911 feet).
