= Paimal Sharif =

Coordinates: 34°44′N 72°59′E

Paimal Sharif پائمال شریف
- Town and union council
- Paimal
- Interactive map of Paimal Sharif
- Country: Pakistan
- District: Battagram District

Government
  - Khan (Chief): Jalal Ud din Khan Jalal Baba Arghushal Swati

Population
  - Total: 5,000
- Time zone: UTC+5 (PS)

Paimal Sharif is a town, that is one of twenty union councils in Battagram District in the Khyber Pakhtunkhwa Province of Pakistan. It was previously part of Thakot tribal area which was ruled by "Khans of Thakot". After the demise of Jan Muhammad Khan Arghushal (10th Khan of Thakot and Paimal), his son Yaqub Khan Arghushal Swati became the "11th Khan of Paimal Sharif" while his elder son Aurangzeb Khan Arghushal Swati (Late) became "11th Khan of Thakot".

It has educational buildings, health facilities, Govt higher secondary school paimal, govt primary schools and a BASIC health unit paimal.
