= Shumlai =

Coordinates: 34°42′20″N 73°7′0″E

Shumlai Banser Sharif
- Town and Union council
- Interactive map of Shumlai
- Country: Pakistan
- Province: Khyber Pakhtunkhwa
- District: Battagram District
- Elevation: 1,567 m (5,141 ft)
- Time zone: UTC+5 (PST)

Shumlai is a town, and one of twenty union councils in Battagram District, in Khyber Pakhtunkhwa province of Pakistan. It is located at 34°42'20N 73°7'0E and has an altitude of 1567 metres (5144 feet).
