= Batamori =

- Town and union council
- Country: Pakistan
- Province: Khyber-Pakhtunkhwa
- District: Battagram District
- Time zone: UTC+5 (PST)

Batamori is a town, and one of twenty union councils in Battagram District of Khyber-Pakhtunkhwa province of Pakistan.
