= Trand =

Pakistani town

Coordinates: 34°38′0″N 72°59′0″E

Trand Urdu: ترند Pashto: ترند
- Town and union council
- Interactive map of Trand
- Country: Pakistan
- Province: Khyber Pakhtunkhwa
- District: Battagram District
- Elevation: 1,303 m (4,275 ft)
- Time zone: UTC+5 (PST)

Trand is a town in Battagram District in Khyber Pakhtunkhwa province of Pakistan, one of 20 union councils in the district. It is located at 34°37'60N 72°58'60E and has an altitude of 1,303 metres (4278 feet). It is part of the NA-13 Battagram constituency.

It is on the western border of Battagram, extending from Landi Kass to Garhi Nawab Syed. Kala Dhaka (known locally as Tore Ghar) lies at its Eastern-West side. The majority of the population consists of the Peer Imami Sayyeds. The most influential political figure of the area was Jamal Khan Swati, known as Khan of Trand۔ Currently his son Muhammad Yousaf Khan Swati, a former provincial minister hold the title of "Khan of Trand".
