= Ajmera =

Pakistani town

Ajmera Urdu: اجمیرہ Pashto: اجمیرہ
- Town
- Location in Pakistan
- Coordinates: 34°40′20″N 73°1′10″E
- Country: Pakistan
- Region: Khyber Pakhtunkhwa
- District: Battagram District
- Elevation: 1,068 m (3,504 ft)
- Time zone: UTC+5 (PST)

Ajmera (Urdu, Pashto: اجميره) is a town of Battagram District in the Khyber Pakhtunkhwa Province of Pakistan. The town serves as the headquarter of the Union Council of the same name and is located at 34°40'20N 73°1'10E and has an altitude of 1068 metres (3507 feet).
