= Kuza Banda =

Coordinates: 34°38′5″N 73°2′30″E

Kuza Banda کوزہ بانڈا کوزہ بانڈا
- Town and union council
- Interactive map of Kuza Banda
- Country: Pakistan
- Province: Khyber Pakhtunkhwa
- District: Battagram District
- Elevation: 1,425 m (4,675 ft)
- Time zone: UTC+5 (PST)

Kuza Banda is a tribal town, and one of twenty union councils in Battagram District in Khyber Pakhtunkhwa province of Pakistan. It is located at 34°38'5N 73°2'30E and has an altitude of 1425 metres (4678 feet). It is linked with the union council town of Battagram, and also to Oghi Tehsil of Mansehra District, by Oghi road, which has been connected with the traditional silk route (or shahrah-e-Resham) since ancient times.
