= Rajdhari =

Coordinates: 34°41′0″N 73°6′0″E

Rajdahri
- Town and union council
- Interactive map of Rajdahri
- Country: Pakistan
- Province: Khyber Pakhtunkhwa
- District: Battagram District
- Elevation: 1,408 m (4,619 ft)
- Time zone: UTC+5 (PST)

Rajdahri is a town, and one of twenty union councils in Battagram District in Khyber Pakhtunkhwa province of Pakistan. It is located at 34°40'60N 73°5'60E and has an altitude of 1408 metres (4622 feet). Khan of Garhi Habibullah is the "Wali of Rajdahri and Neeli-Shang" since last 11 generations.
