= Peshora =

Peshora Urdu: پیشورہ Pashto: پېشوړه
- Town and union council
- Country: Pakistan
- Province: Khyber Pakhtunkhwa
- District: Battagram District
- Time zone: UTC+5 (PST)

Peshora is a town, and one of twenty union councils in Battagram District in Khyber Pakhtunkhwa province of Pakistan.
