= Battagram District =

District & City in Khyber Pakhtunkhwa, Pakistan

Battagram ضلع بٹگرام بټګرام ولسوالۍ
- District
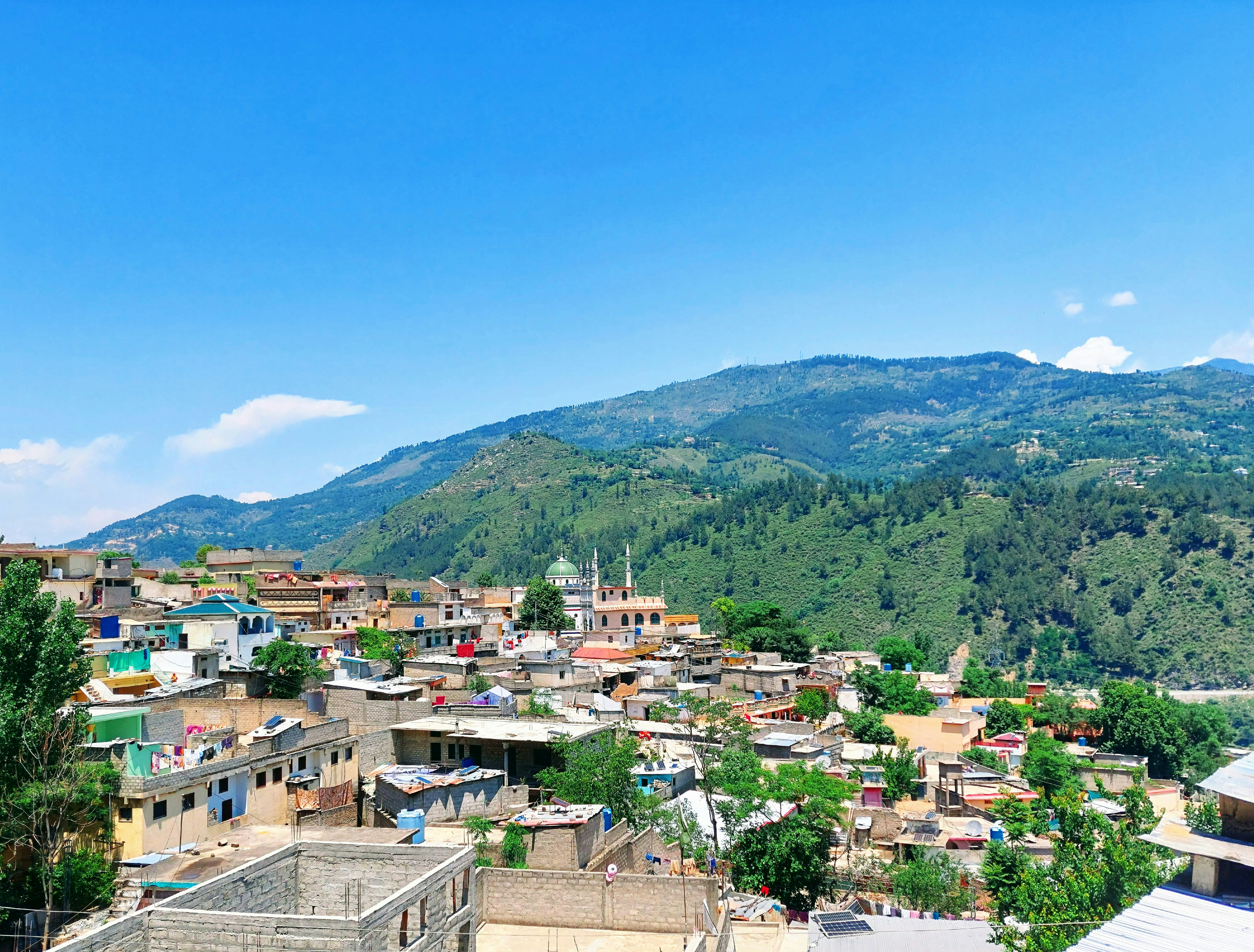
- Shingli Bala village in Battagram tehsil

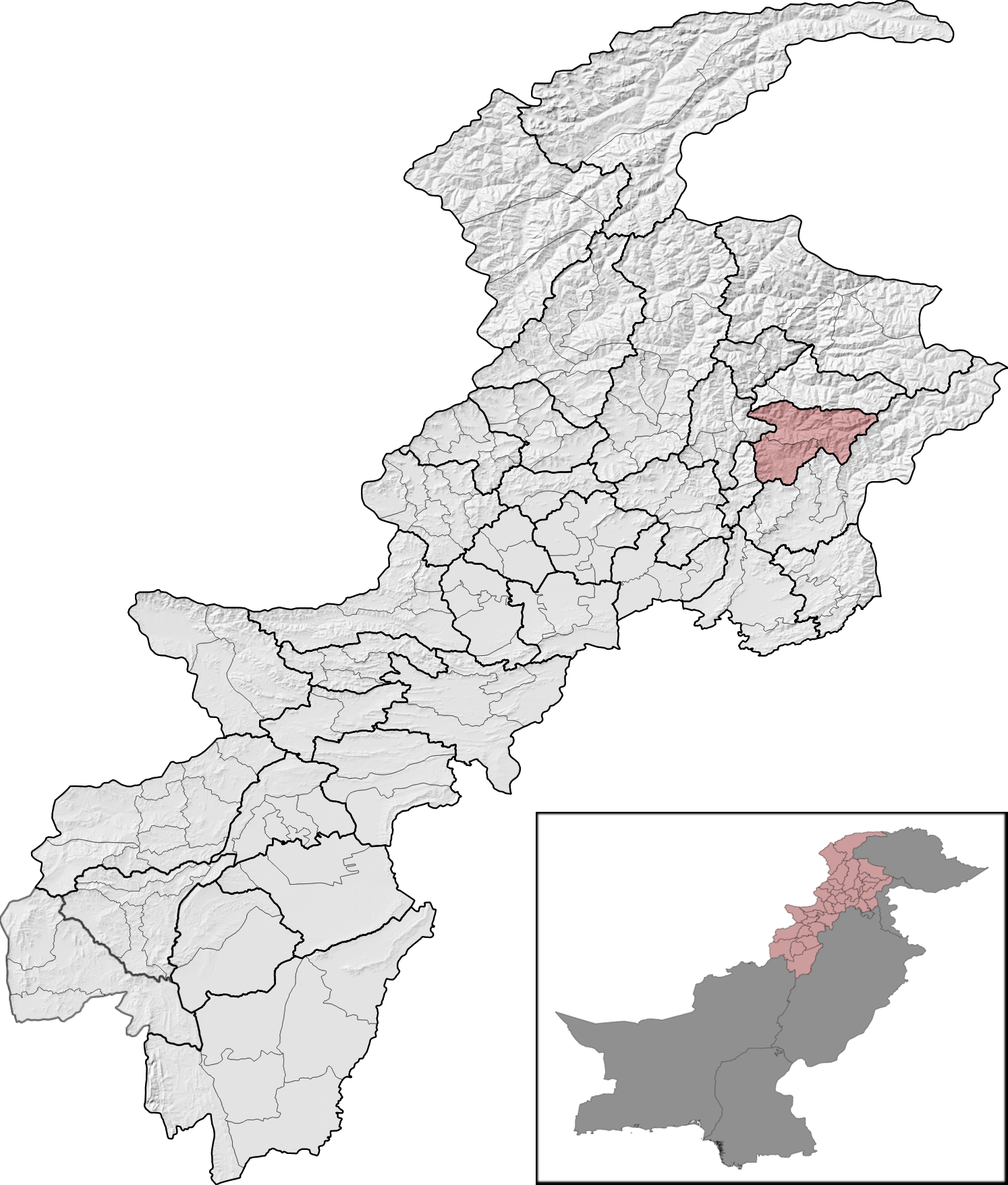
- Battagram District (red) in Khyber Pakhtunkhwa
- Coordinates: 34.41°N 73.1°E
- Country: Pakistan
- Province: Khyber Pakhtunkhwa
- Division: Hazara
- Region: Hazara region
- Established: July 1993
- City Hall: Battagram

Government
  - Type: District Administration
  - MNA: Prince Nawaz Khan Swati (Pakistan Tehreek Insaf)
  - MPA Battagram-I: Engr Zubair Khan Swati
  - MPA Battagram-II: Taj Muhammad Khan Swati of Trand

Area
  - District: 497 km^{2} (192 sq mi)
- Elevation: 1,038 m (3,406 ft)

Population (2023)
  - District: 335,984
  - Density: 676/km^{2} (1,750/sq mi)
  - Urban: 0
  - Rural: 335,984 (100%)

Literacy
  - Literacy rate: Total: (39.09%); Male: (54.69%); Female: (23.34%)
- Time zone: UTC5 (PST)
- Zip/Postal Code: 21040
- Area code: 0997
- Number of Tehsils: 1
- Website: battagram.kp.gov.pk

Battagram (Pashto: بټګرام ولسوالۍ, Urdu: ضلع بٹگرام) is a tribal district in Hazara Division of Khyber Pakhtunkhwa province in Pakistan. The headquarter is Battagram, which is about 75 km from Mansehra city. It was part of historic Yaghistan (Independent Territory) before 1955. Later in 1955, It was merged into Pakistan and made part of neighboring Mansehra District with the status of Tehsil. It was officially separated from Mansehra District in July 1993 and was given the status of district.

== Geography ==
The district of Battagram is located at a latitude of 34.41 and longitude of 73.1. It is surrounded by Kohistan District to the north, Mansehra District to the east, (Torghar District) to the south, and Shangla District to the west.

It has a land area of 1,301 square kilometres (502 sq mi). Battagram obtained the status of a district in July 1993, when it was upgraded from a Tehsil and separated from Mansehra District.

=== Location and Altitude ===
- Battagram is situated at 34°41'N 73°1'E and has an altitude of approximately 1,038 meters (3,408 feet) above sea level.
- It is nestled amidst the picturesque mountains of northern Pakistan.

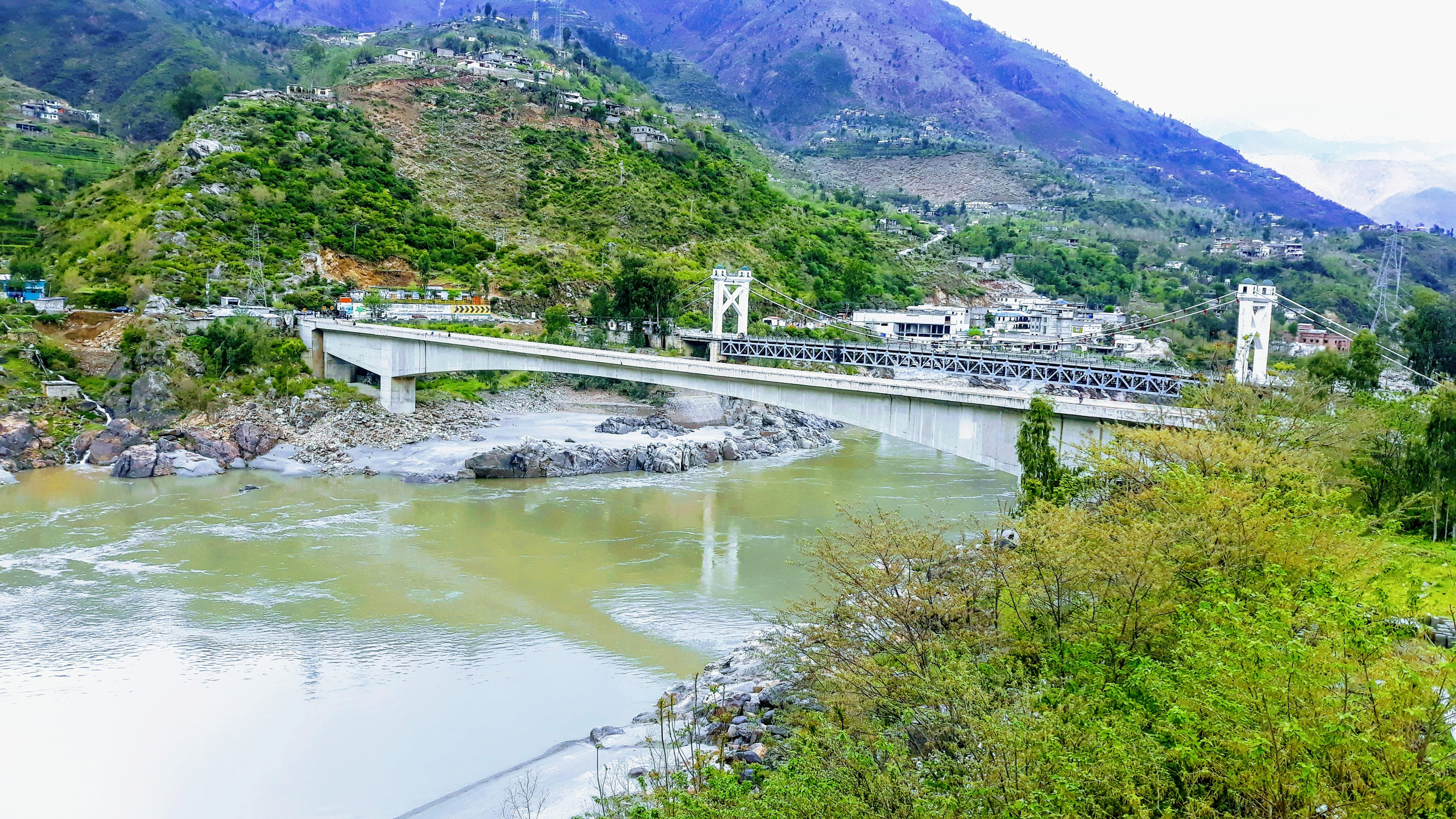
Thakot Bridge, Battagram

=== Climate ===
- Battagram experiences a mild and generally warm climate.
- The average temperature hovers around 18.5 °C (65.3 °F), and the annual precipitation averages about 1,427 millimeters (56.18 inches).
- June is the hottest month, while January is the coldest.

== Demographics ==
=== Population ===
Historical population
Year	Pop.	±% p.a.
1951	...	—
1961	72,394	—
1972	117,909	+4.53%
1981	204,164	+6.29%
1998	185,626	−0.56%
2017	296,247	+2.49%
2023	335,984	+2.12%

As of the 2023 census, Batagram district has 51,366 households and a population of 335,984. The district has a sex ratio of 101.26 males to 100 females and a literacy rate of 39.09%: 54.69% for males and 23.34% for females. 103,719 (30.89% of the surveyed population) are under 10 years of age. The entire population lives in rural areas. 799 (0.24%) people in the district are from religious minorities, mainly Christians.

=== Social groups ===
Major ethnic groups in the districts are:

- Gujjar
- Swati (pashtuns)
- Akundkhel (pashtuns)
- Medakhel (pashtuns)

=== Language ===
Languages of Battagram district (2023)
1. Pashto (80.0%)
2. Gujari (18.0%)
3. Hindko & Kohistani (2.00%)

At the time of the 2023 census, 80% of the population spoke Pashto, 18% Gujari, and 2% speak Hindko and Kohistani languages. 11.88% of the population spoke languages classified as 'Others', mainly other Kohistani languages.

== Administration ==
The district has geographical borders with the districts of Kohistan to the north, Mansehra to the east and southeast, Torghar to the south and Shangla to the west. The district consists of only one sub-division or Tehsil, containing 12 in total Union Councils:

In 2022, Allai Tehsil was separated and upgraded to District status.

Tehsil	Urdu name	Pashto name	Area (km²)	Pop. (2023)	Density (ppl/km²) (2023)	Literacy rate (2023)	No. of Unions	Name of Unions
Battagram Tehsil	تحصیل بٹگرام	بټګرام تحصیل	497	335,984	676.02	41.20%	12	Ajmera, Banian, Battagram, Batamori, Gijbori, Kuza Banda, Paimal Sharif, Peshora, Rajdhari, Shumlai, Thakot and Trand

=== Provincial Assembly ===
Member of Provincial Assembly	Party affiliation	Constituency	Year
Zubair Khan Swati (Allai Khan)	Pakistan Tehreek-e-Insaf	PK-34 Battagram-I	2024
Taj Muhammad Khan Swati (Trand Khan)	Pakistan Tehreek-e-Insaf	PK-35 Battagram-II	2024

== Education ==
- Several schools and colleges contribute to improving the literacy rate in the area but majority of Private schools are miss leading children as they provide Copy/Paste Answers to students during exam.
- NGOs and foreign funds have played a role in building schools to enhance education.

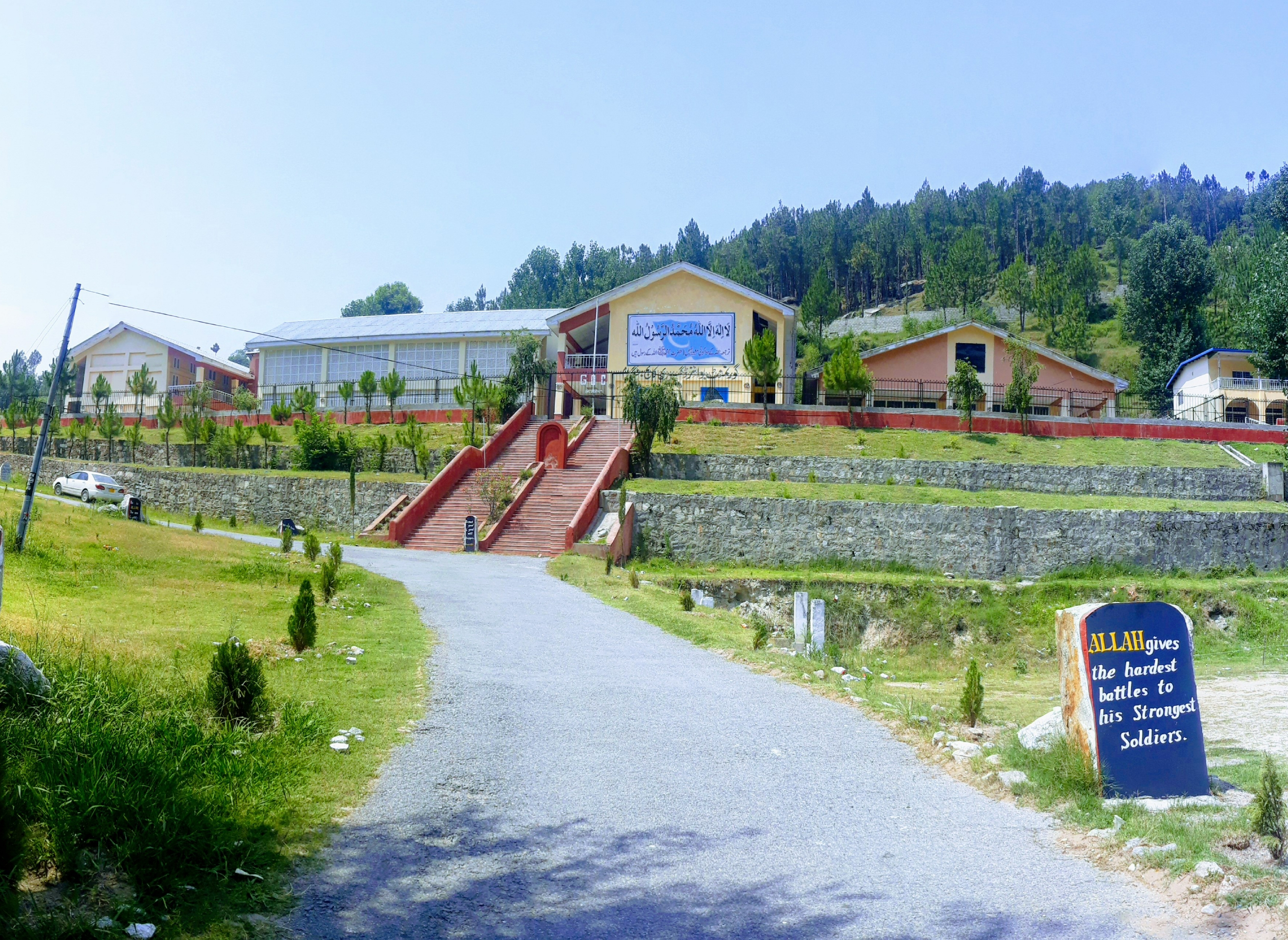
Govt Degree College Chappargram, Battagram

== 2005 earthquake ==
Battagram was one of the areas affected by the Pakistan earthquake of October 8, 2005 when more than 4,500 people were killed and approximately 35,000 were injured. Many residents of the area were rendered homeless and without shelter. Since October 8, 2005, the NGOs and the governmental organization Earthquake Reconstruction and Rehabilitation Authority have been engaged in reconstruction work but as of 2009, the reconstruction work is not completed. In some cases residents have rebuilt houses themselves.

== Bibliography ==
- 1981 District Census report of Mansehra. District Census Report. Vol. 23. Islamabad: Population Census Organization, Statistics Division, Government of Pakistan. 1983.
- 1998 District Census report of Batagram. Census publication. Vol. 18. Islamabad: Population Census Organization, Statistics Division, Government of Pakistan. 1999.
