= Kaddi =

- Location within Pakistan
- Coordinates: 34°04′33″N 72°29′03″E
- Country: Pakistan
- Province: Khyber-Pakhtunkhwa
- District: Swabi

Area
  - Total: 2 km^{2} (0.77 sq mi)

Population (2017)
  - Estimate: 9,606
- Time zone: UTC+5 (PST)
- Number of Union councils: 1

Kaddi (کڈی) (also known as Kaday or کډے in Pashto) is a village in the Swabi District of Khyber-Pakhtunkhwa. The inhabitants belong to Aba Khel subtribe of Mandanr Yusufzai Pakhtuns who occupy Swabi and Mardan districts of Khyber-Pakhtunkhwa. The major khel living in Kaddi include Balar Khel, Taju Khel, Zakarya Khel, Khan Khel and Panj Pao.

== History ==
The name Kaddi appears to be derived from Kada which in Pashto refers to a place lower than normal in height. Historically Kaddi had a great natural lake with seasonal birds from Siberia flocking in winter. Majority of the lake was converted into residential area. The present population of Kaddi is likely to have settled here in late 17th century as a spill over from the nearby town Zaida with which they still maintain close economic links.

== Area and people ==
Having an area of about 2 square km, Kaddi is situated to the south of Panj Pir and is bounded on its west by Badrai stream and hills. The irrigation Pehor canal runs through Kaddi on its western side which has been beautifully siphoned to pass under Badrai. The feature is locally known as "Sepun" (Pashto:سیپن). Also on its eastern side runs another small narrow canal off from the same Pehor canal. The population of Kaddi according to the latest 2017 census is 9606, with 1298 households. While originally people were farmers by profession, in the last three decades or so; work in overseas along with government jobs have taken over the farming. Now the main source of income is remittances from abroad along with government jobs. There are three government and two private schools in the village. The literacy rate is around 80%. Literacy among young, who outnumber any other age groups, is even higher.

== People ==
The people in Kaddi belong to Usi Khel, Aba Khel subtribe of Mandanr Yusafzai. The Khel include Balar Khel, Taju Khel, Panj Pao and Zakarya Khel. Some other families are also settled in Kaddi along with Yusafzai tribe including Jadoon and Awan families.

== Balar Khel ==
Ancestors of Balar Khel in village Kaddi are:

a. Tura Baz Khan: He came from Hund as the chieftain of the village. His descendants are therefore also known as Khan Khel. The lineage is traced to Balar as follow: Balar Khan --> Rana Khan --> Zabita Khan --> Buland Khan --> Tura Baz Khan.

b. Buchi Khan: Four sons of Buchi Khan; Khanzada, Azeem Khan, Hurmat & Umar came to Kaddi from Zaida leaving their fifth brother Zareef behind. Descendants of the former two at present constitute Balar Khel proper. The lineage of Buchi Khan can be traced to Balar in fourth generation as follows: Balar Khan --> Rana Khan --> Dargayi --> Buchi Khan

c. Sadr Khan: Sadr Khan came to Kaddi from Zaida leaving his two brothers Mehmood Khan and Daem Khan in Zaida. They live in an area between Balar Khel and Zakarya Khel and are closely associated to both Khel. The lineage of Sadr Khan can be traced to Balar as follows: Balar Khan --> Rana Khan --> Dargayi --> Muhammad Khan --> Sadr Khan

(The latter two have been described in the Land Compilation Book of 1872 as to be unable to trace their lineage to Balar. However names of Buchi Khan and Muhammad Khan can be found in Balar Khel located in Zaida.)

d. Kalu Khan: Descendants of Kalu Khan live in association with Taju Khel. He came to Kaddi from Panj Pir where his grandfather Moiz Ullah Khan had come from Hund as chieftain of the village. They are therefore in fact Khan Khel Balar Khel presently living in association with Taju Khel. The lineage of Kalu Khan can be traced to Balar as follows: Balar Khan --> Rana Khan --> Zabita Khan --> Buland Khan --> Moiz Ullah Khan --> Fateh Ali Khan --> Kalu Khan

e. Associated Balar Khel: Apart from the four families mentioned above there are few associated families living in close association with Balar Khel though not genealogically related to Balar Khan. These include Jadoon and Awan families.

== Taju Khel ==
As per the Britannica Encyclopaedia's 11th Edition, Taju Khel or Tajo Khel are the sub tribe of Yousafzai. They live in many parts of Pakistan and India including Kaddi, Zaida, Marghuz, Lahor, Beka, Sala, Haryan in Pakistan and Bhopal, Delhi, Agraa and Pathan Kot in India. Some Taju Khel in Swabi still have strong family terms with their relatives in India. They are the descendants of Doran Khan. Furthur more according to Roshan Khan the author of 'The History of Yousafzai' Taju Khel along with four other brothers came to current swabi roughly around 16th century from Afghan province Kundooz. Currently the estimated population of Taju Khel globally is around 100,000 to 170,000 but these figures are merely speculative and can vary exponentially.

According to oral tradition recorded by a local elder and historian of Yaqubi village, Taju Khel, Zakarya Khel, Panj Pao and Balar Khel, Taus Khani, Bazid Khel and Ayub Khel were brothers whose lineage formed the Aba Khel clan; however, historians note that such traditional genealogies among Pashtun tribes often lack definitive documentation.

Beka, Tajukhel Tribe ancestor is Malak Mehmood Khan after that Malak Nooroze, Malak Abdul Ghani, Malak Rizwan, then after that Malak Jahanzaib, Malak Amraiz, Malak Jawed, & Malak Mairaj

== Political Map ==
Kaddi falls within the newly created NA-18 and PK-44 constituencies. Previously, it was part of NA-13 and PK-35. Kaddi has one District Councilor-Faizul Hayat of ANP. Every election brings its own favorite in the village politics. Historically, Kaddi has been a stronghold of ANP for long. The visits of Bacha Khan and Wali Khan have been the hallmark of village politics.

Members of Red Shirt moment had suffered at the hands of British Raj. Pakistan creation didn't help them as now they were given the same treatment, in cases worse. With the creation of Pakistan, Muslim League also made its presence in the village. Rise of Bhutto populist politics also found its appeal in the village too. In 2002, MMA swept the poll. While in 2008 Kaddi supported ANP, JUIf and PPP. The Election in 2013 brought PTI as the leading force, but JUIf and other parties also kept their presence. Kaddi voters are fiercely independent and deeply political. With young calling the shots, electoral situation has become more complex.

== Road and Motorway connectivity ==
On its western side, Kaddi is connected to Zaida village through Pehor Canal Road. Swabi interchange at M-1 is at the distance of 9 km from the village. On its southern side the village is connected to Kunda-Topi road. For decades that was the only proper single road of the village. On its North eastern side the village is connected to Panj Pir village, from where people have been accessing Swabi central since long. Swabi central is around 9 km from Kaddi village. To the south, the Indus river is at 10 km drive.

== Sports ==
The young generation has interest in cricket while the traditional sports of the village include Kabaddi and Makha. Latter is an archery sport in which a long arrow (Pashto: Ghashay) is used along with a long bow (Pashto:Leenda). The arrow has a saucer shaped metallic plate (Pashto:tubray) at its distal end. The archers play in teams and attempt to hit a small white wooden target called takai surrounded by a circular ring called kwaara. The target is secured in fresh clay placed at some height a few meters away from the archer. Pictures of the sport at village Kaddi have been placed in the gallery.

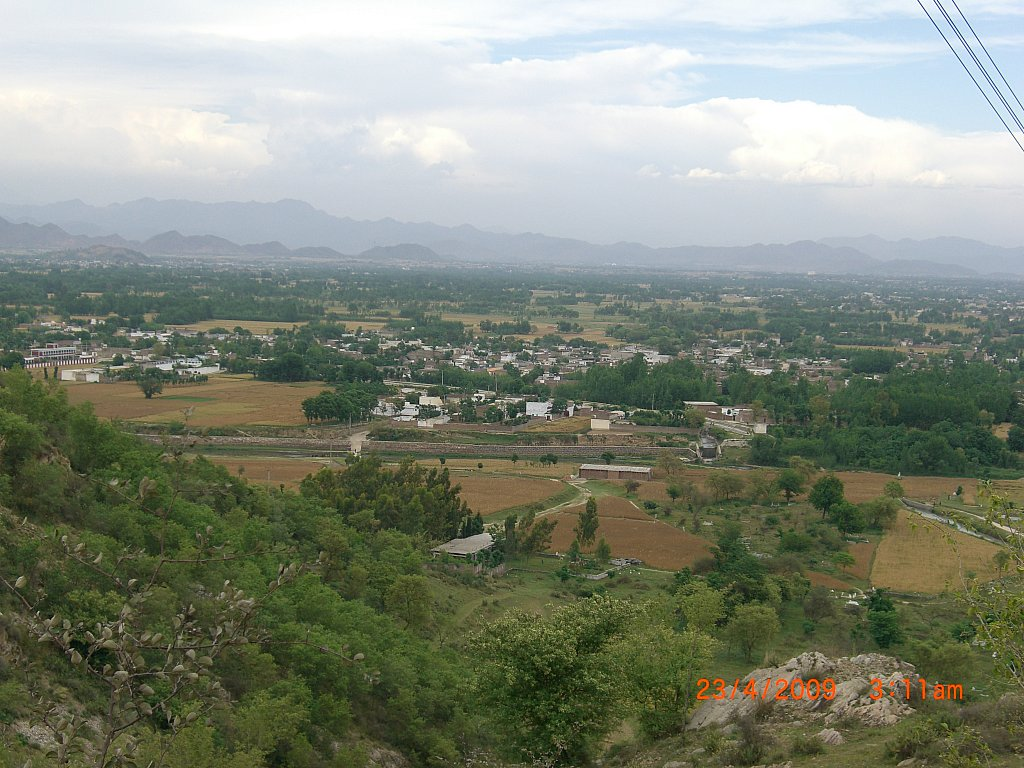
View of village Kaddi from Tur Ghund Hill.

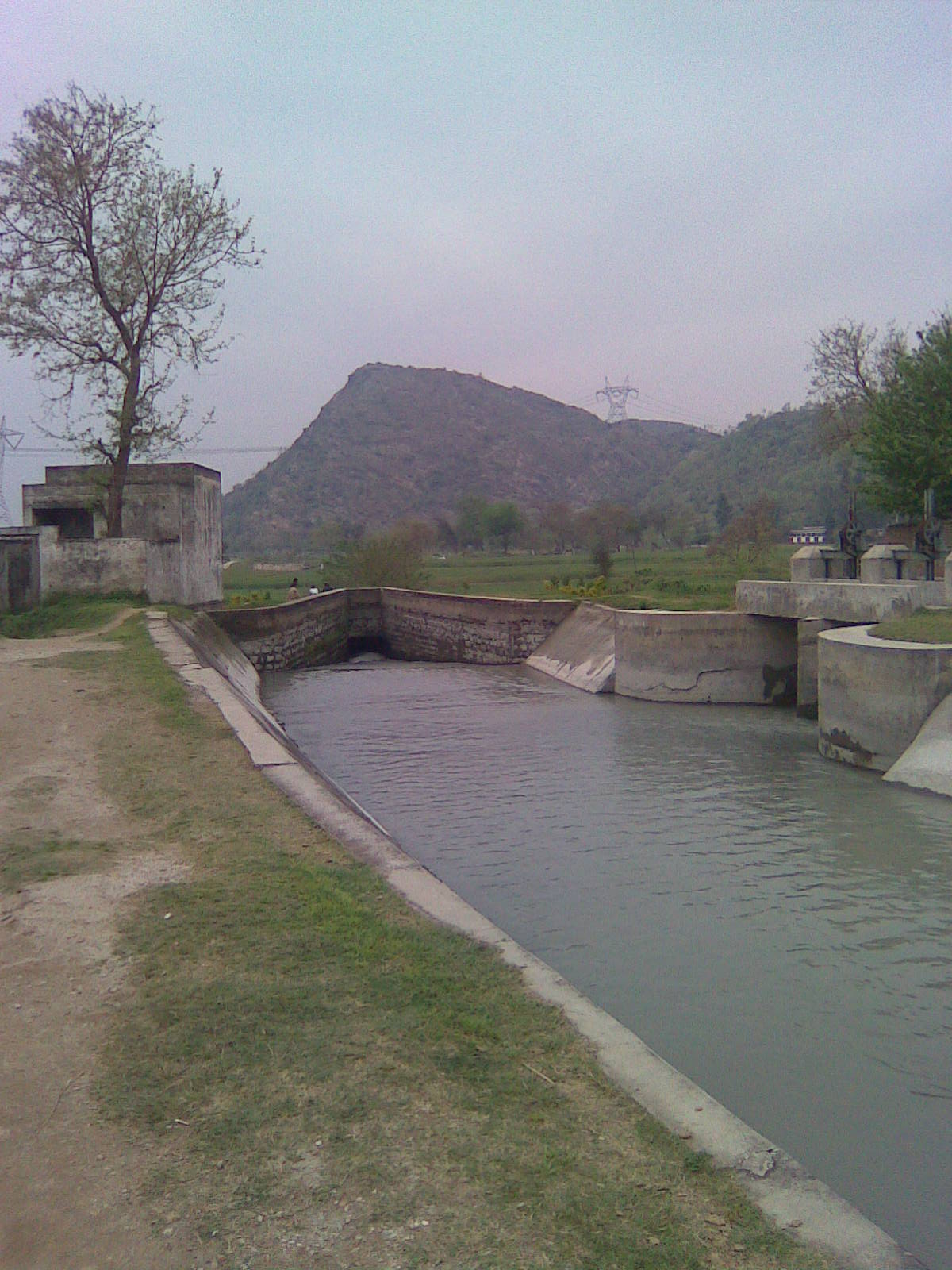
Irrigation canal Pehur siphoning beneath Badrai at Kaddi locally called sepun.

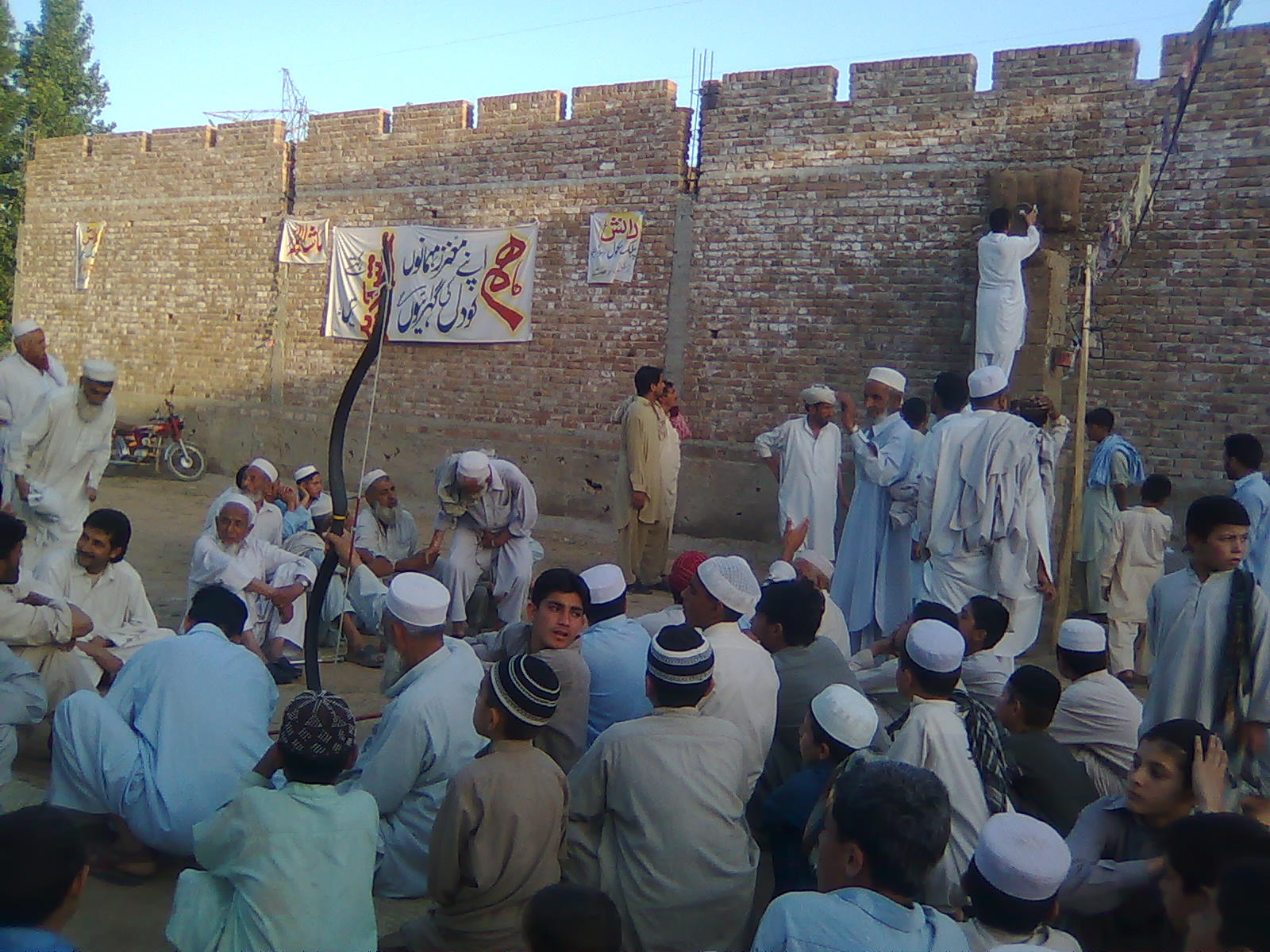
The traditional archery sport of Pathans called Makha. Target is being prepared.

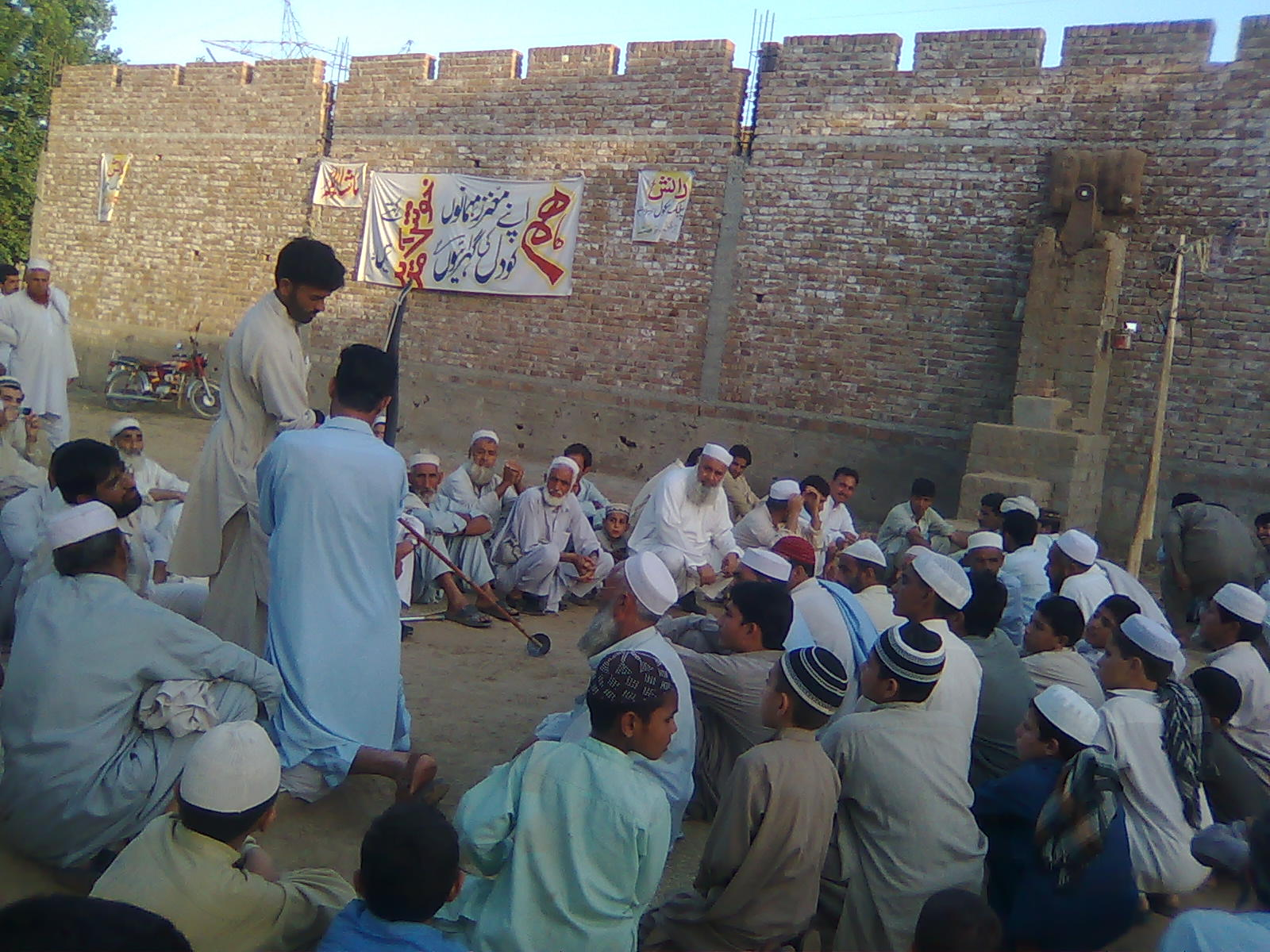
Makha - The archer is preparing to take the shot. A friend is helping him.

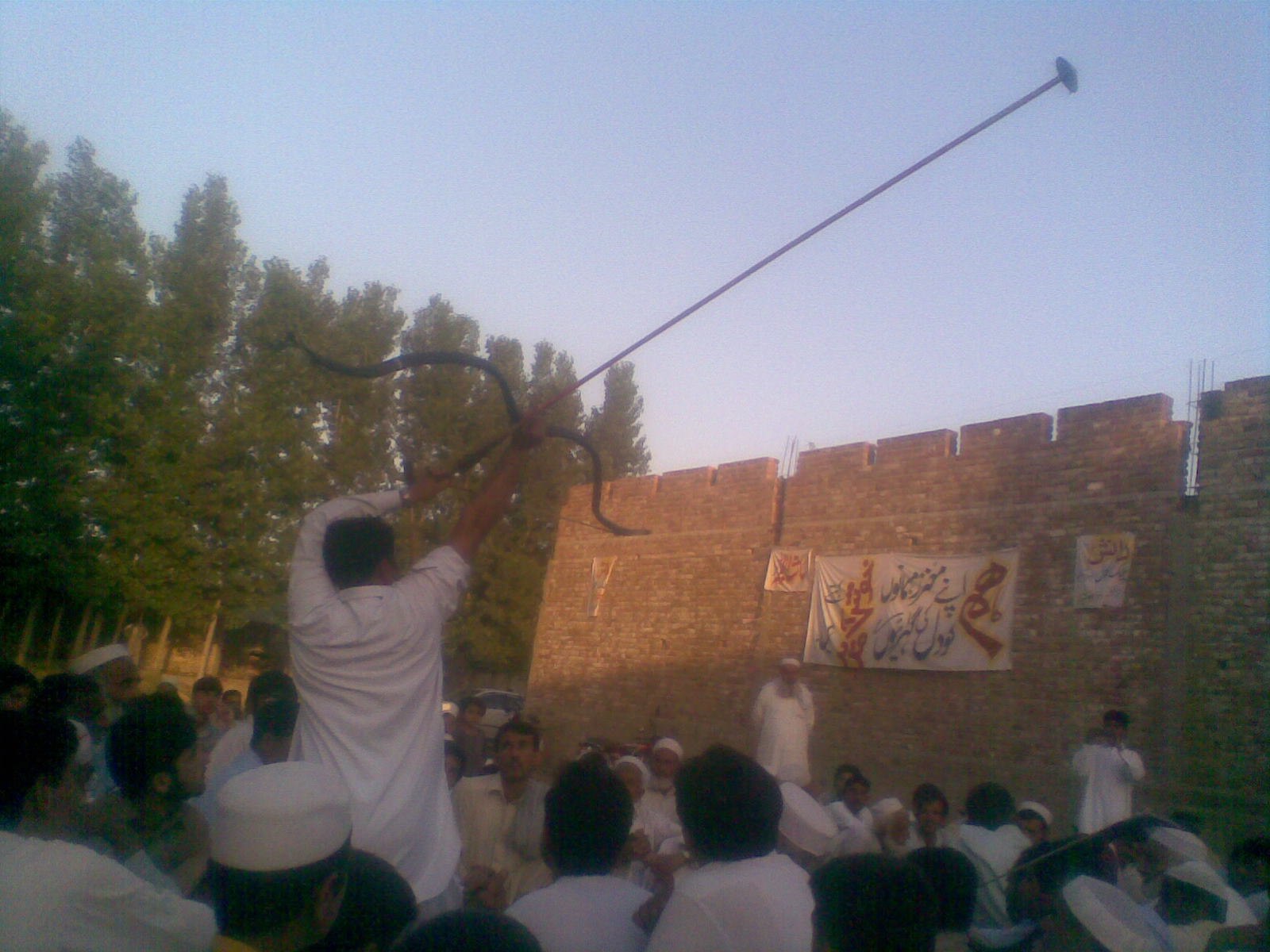
Makha - Archer positioning and starting to aim at the target.

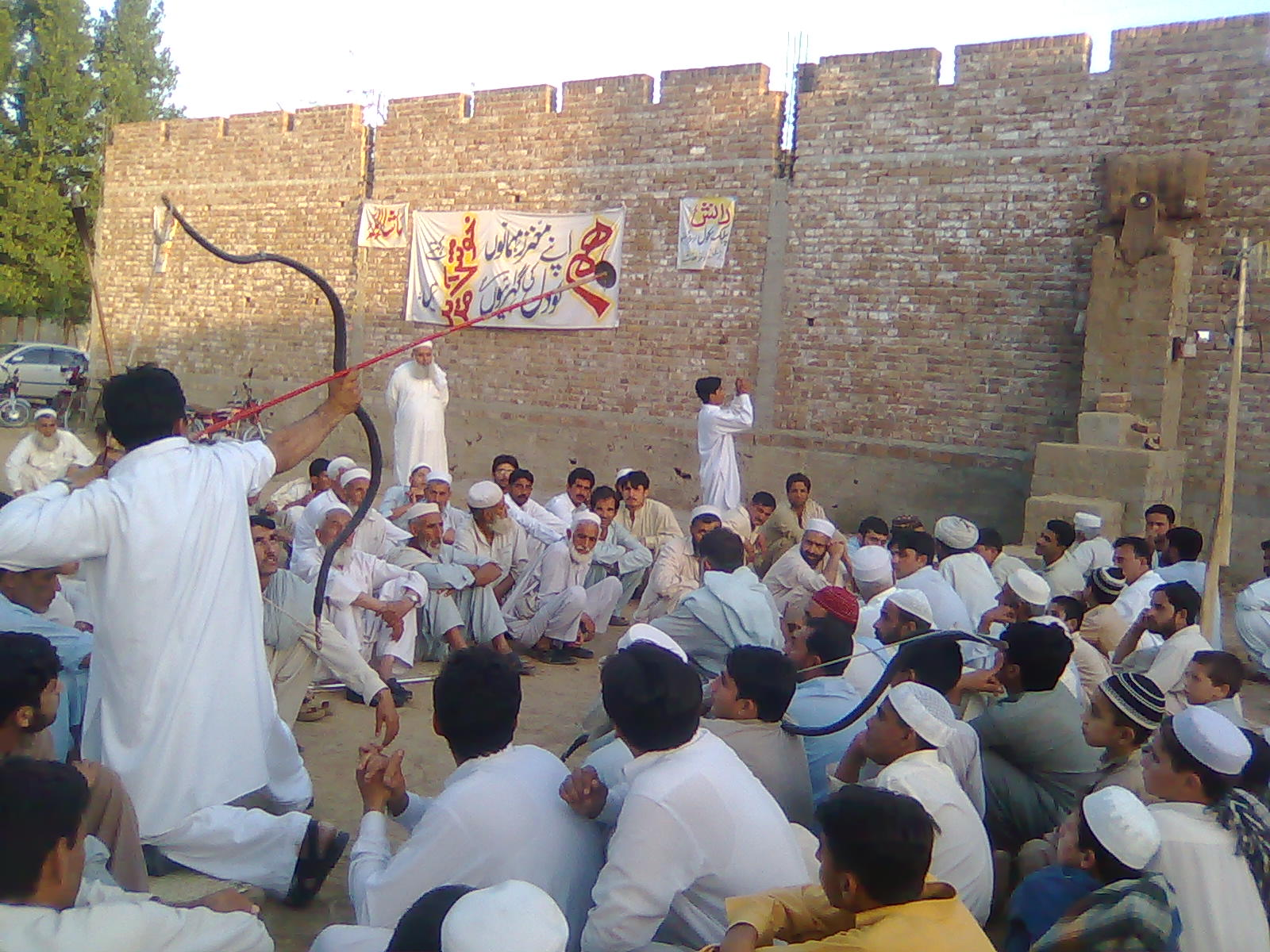
Makha - Archer aiming at the target.

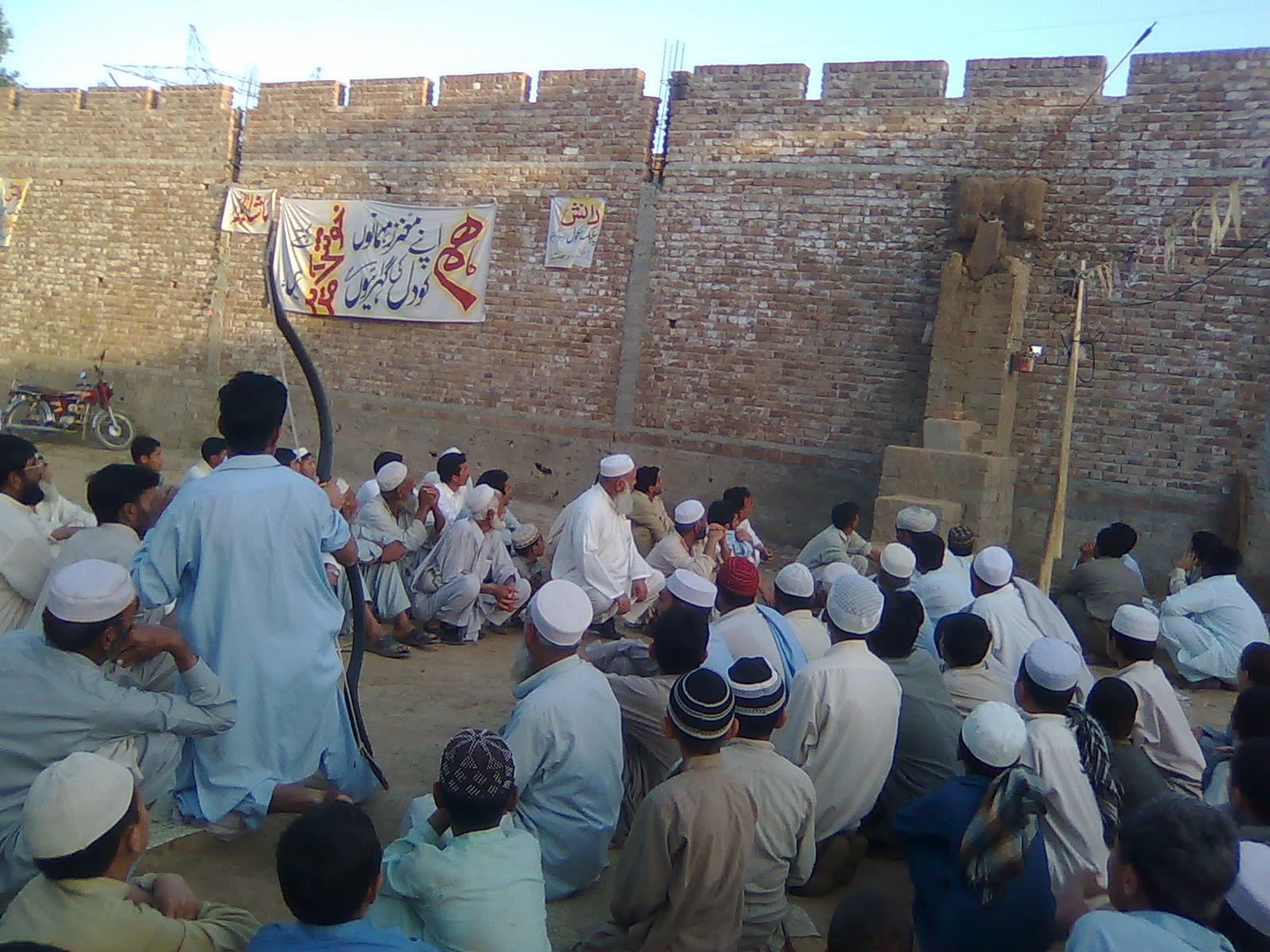
Makha - Target successfully hit.

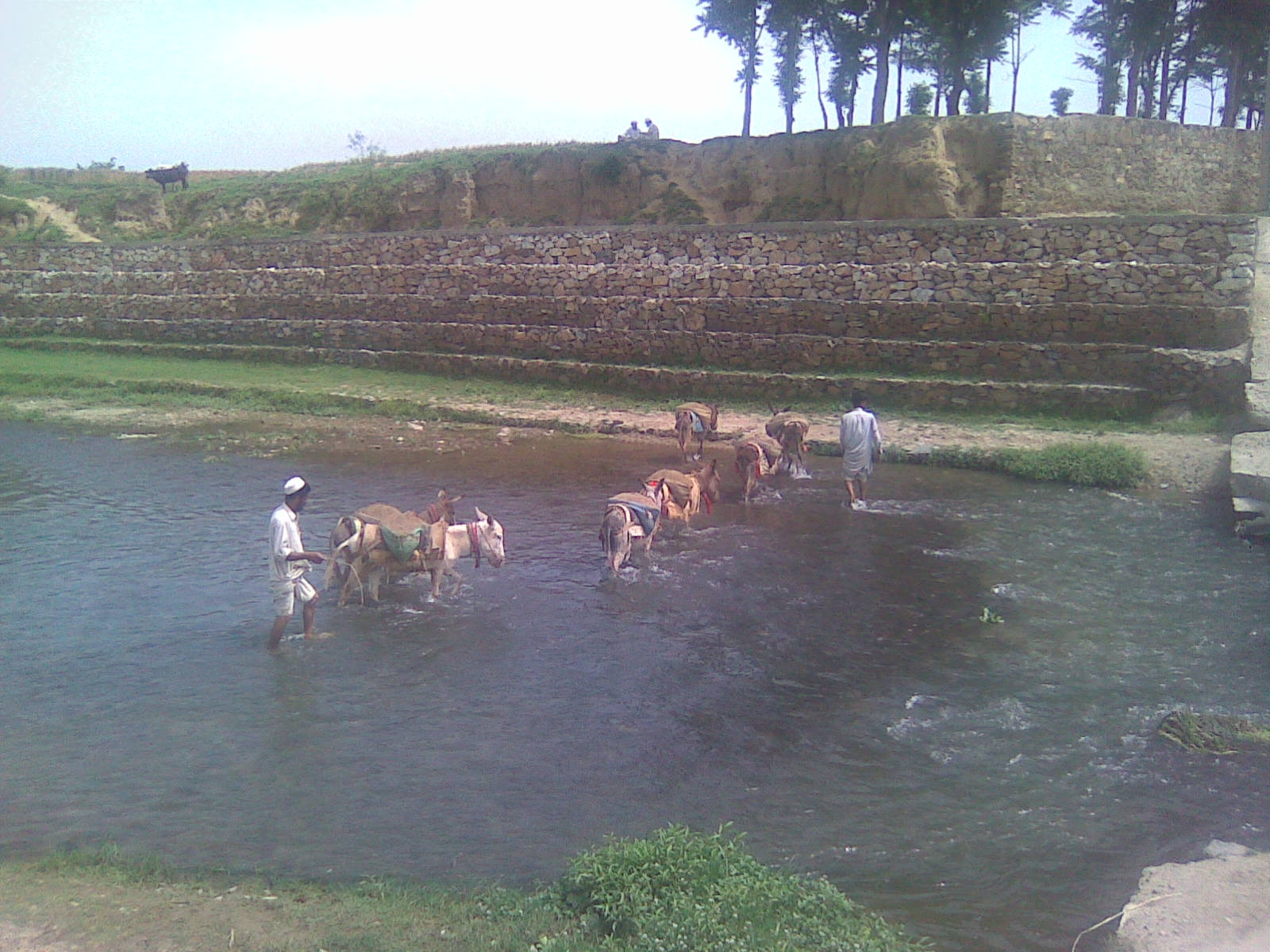
Donkeys carrying sand across nullah Badrai at village Kaddi.

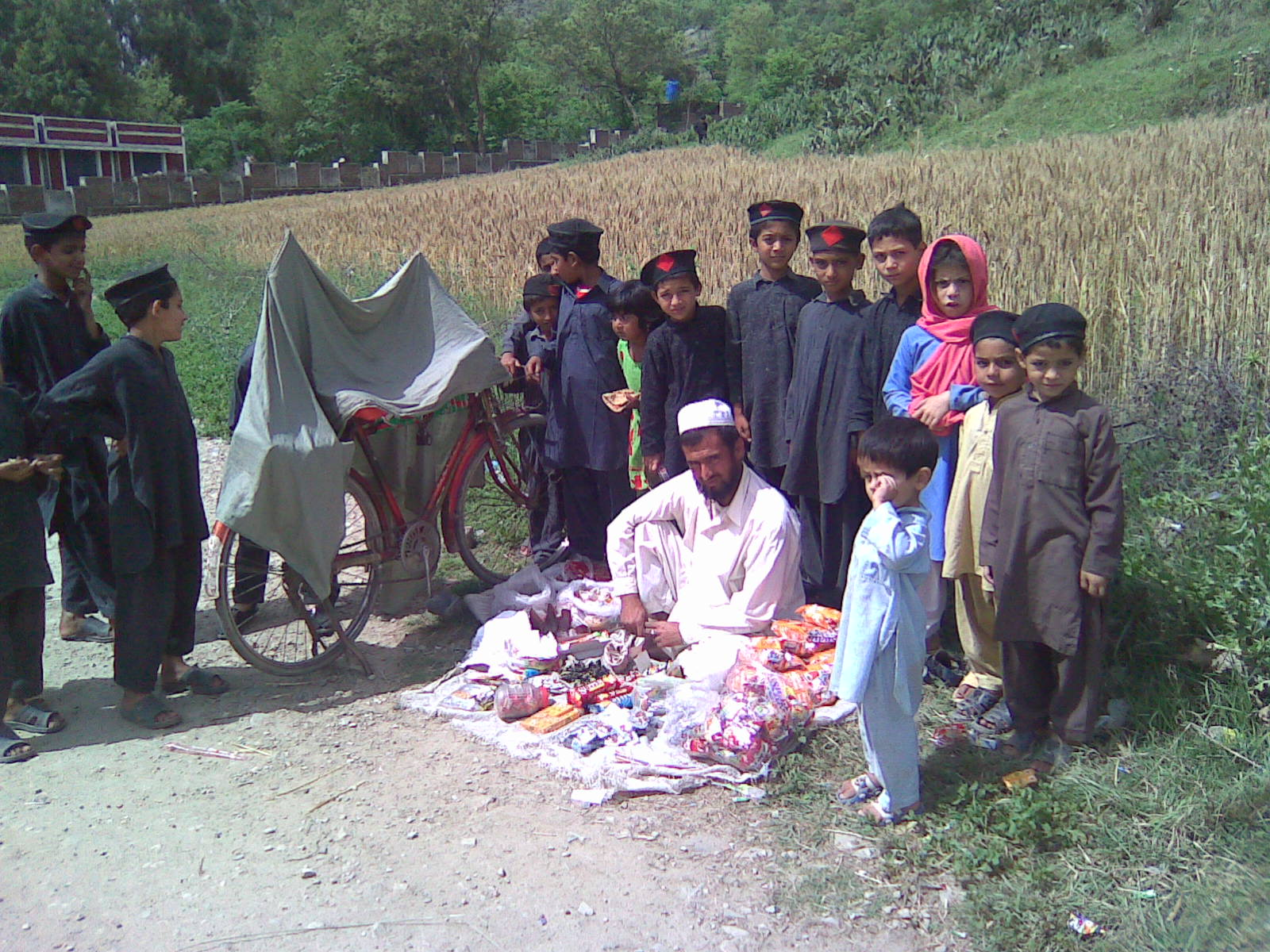
School children of Govt Primary School Kaddi at a mobile tuckshop near the school.

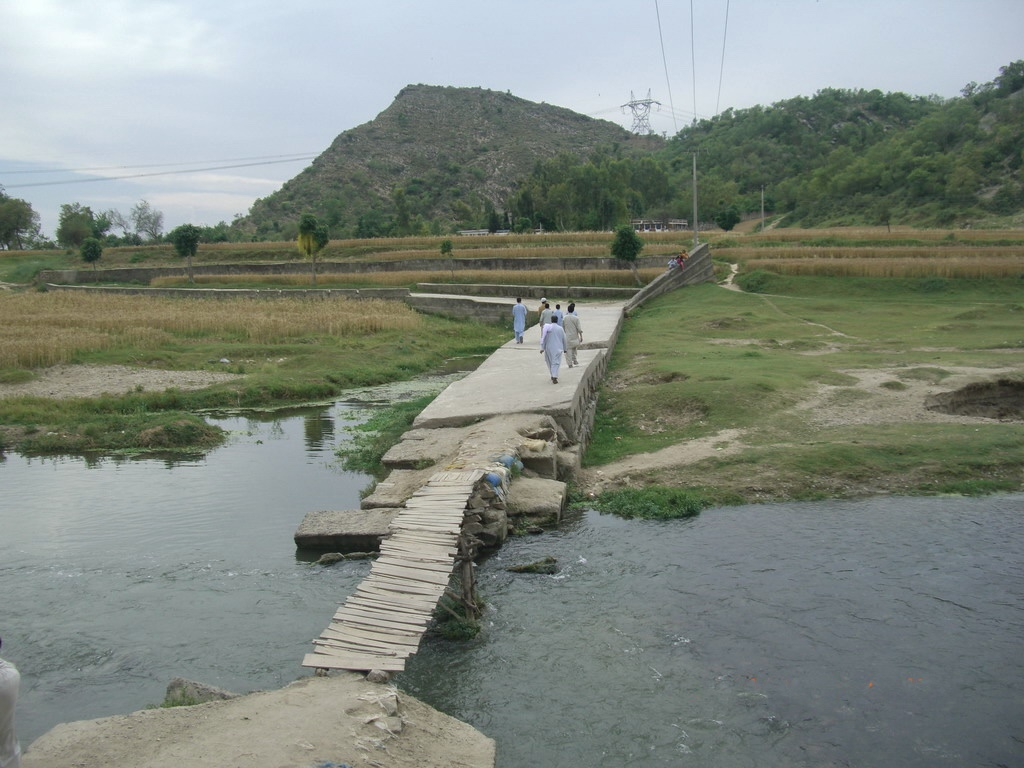
The wooden bridge at nullah Badrai at village Kaddi.

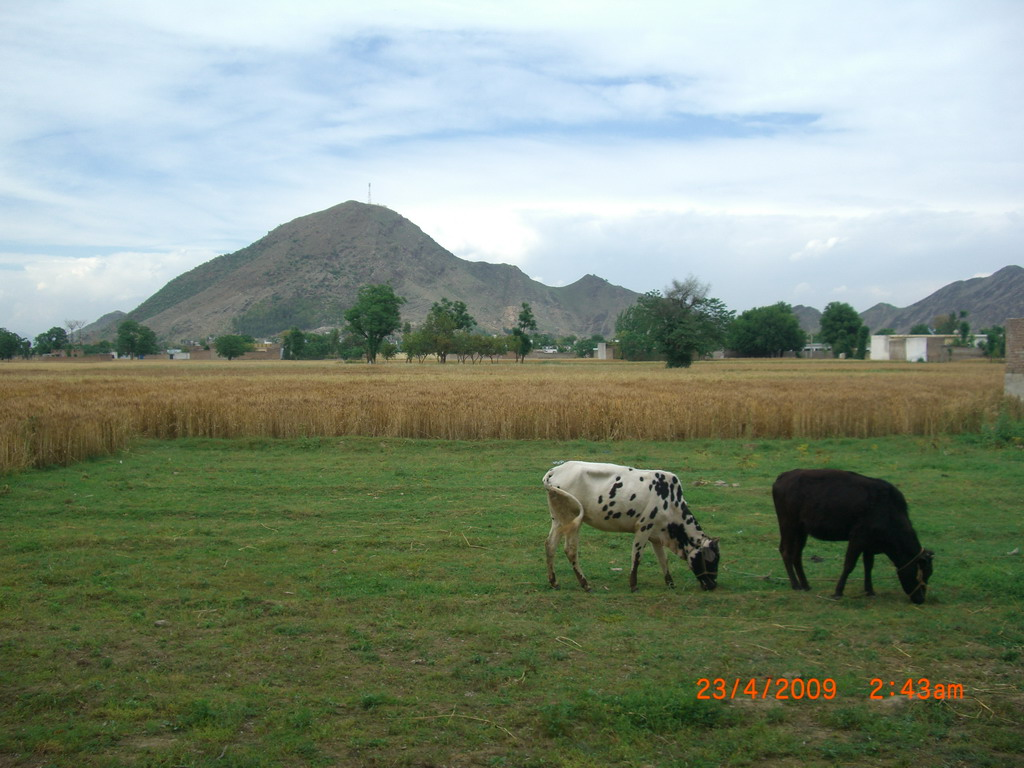
A scenic view of Panj Pir Hill from village Kaddi.

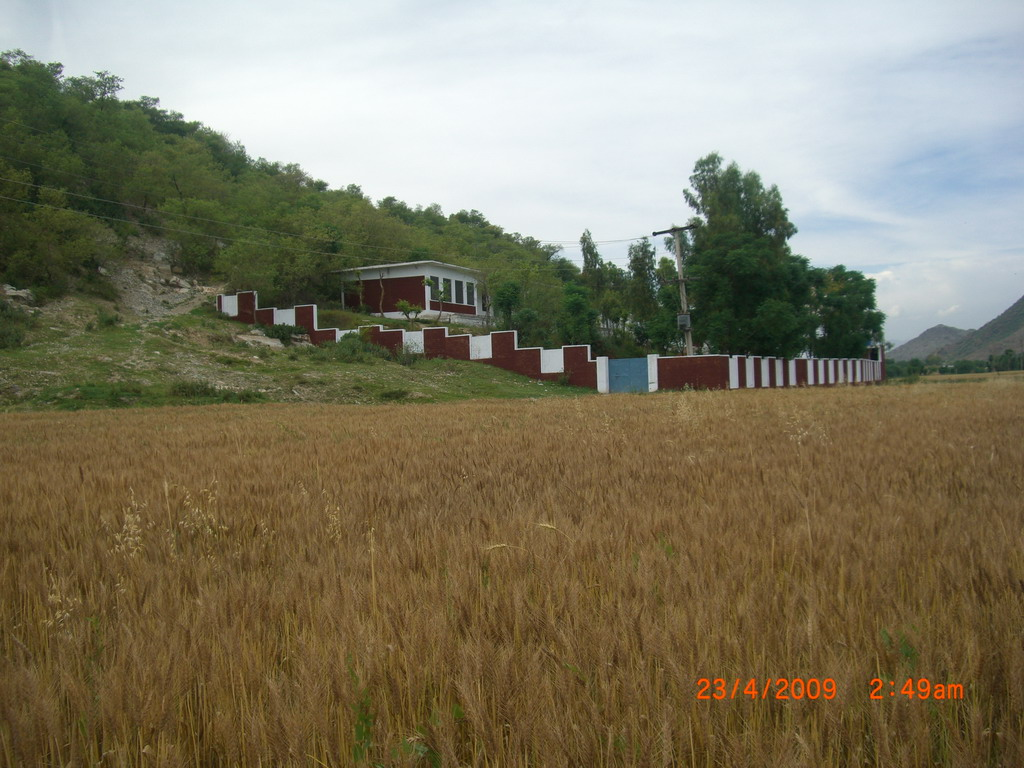
Govt High School Kaddi across nullah Badrai.
