= Kalu Khani thalee =

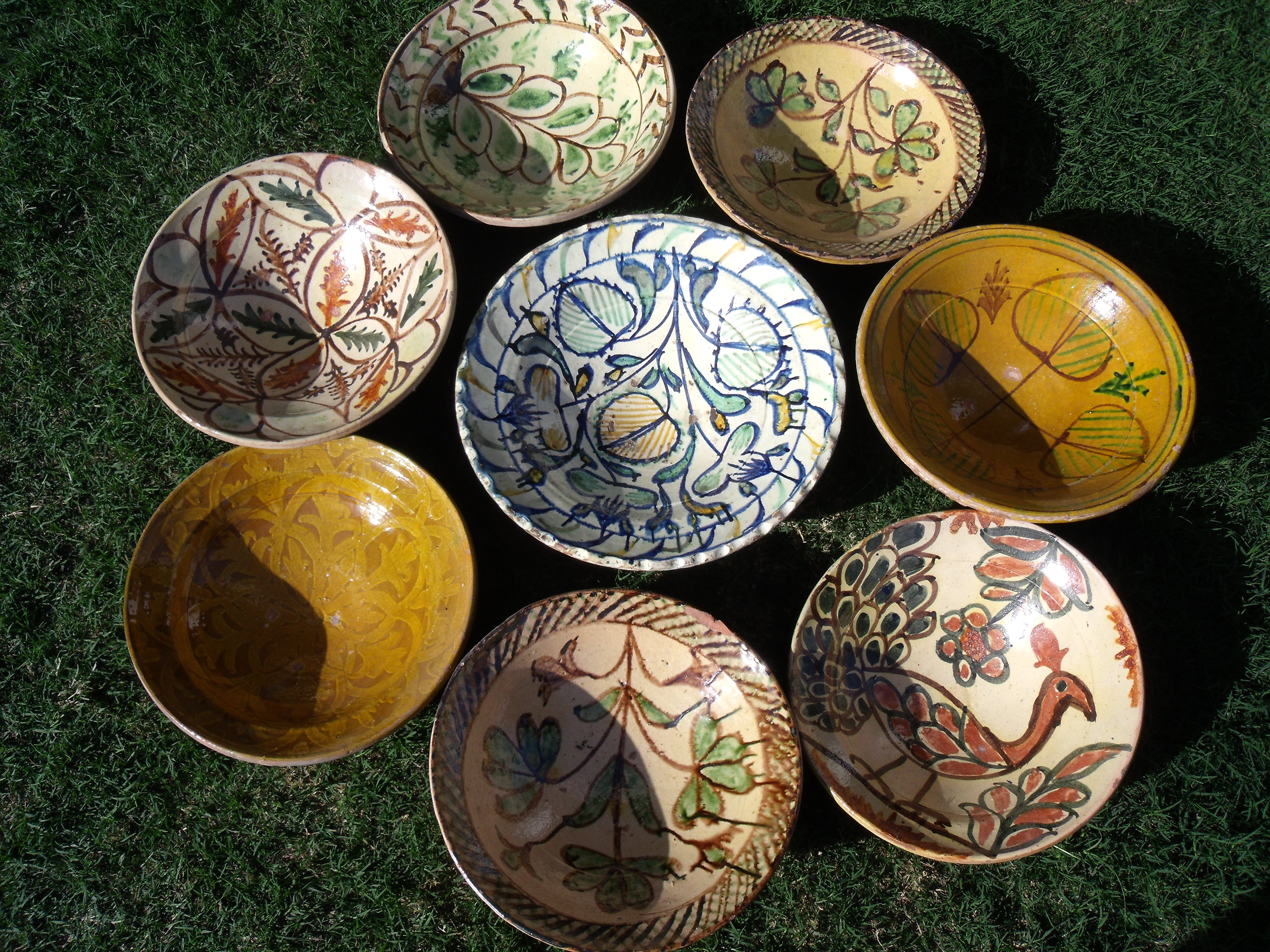
Kalu Hhani Thalee

Kalu-Khani Thalee were traditional glazed earthenware deep dishes or plates used on special occasions to serve guests or members of Hashar (collective voluntary working force). It was used up until around last quarter of 20th century in most of the villages of Swabi District, Mardan Division, Khyber Pakhtunkhwa, Pakistan. Every household used to keep a few of these decorative glazed dishes for serving the guests on special occasions and celebrations. They were decorated and glazed in different colours. Conventionally, hot chicken curry was served in these dishes, with almost enough for 4 to 6 persons for combined or group eating added with another special paste- curry called Lawanr. Lawanr, being a viscous mixture, was especially cooked for the purpose of thickening the otherwise thin chicken curry from Shumle and maize flour.

It was customary that tandoori breads were first chopped into small pieces and soaked in the curry for eating by all from the same dish jointly. The ultimate cocktail ready for eating used to be a scrumptious mixture of chopped tandoori bread, a bit of spicy Lawanr both fully soaked in thin spicy chicken curry without chicken pieces.

The spicy chicken pieces, fried separately, would be distributed among the guests; one per head, in the middle by an elderly person from the host family unit. The elderly person would distribute these spicy chicken pieces after due thought and observing a protocol among the guests according to the status and age of each recipient.

The dishes used to come only from Kalu Khan, a village in Razzar, a dominant clan of Mandanr, a sub-tribe of Yousafzai in the Swabi district, because the potters of that village were famous for its making and the item was named after the village. Glazed pottery was once a great art in the valley of Kashmir who introduced this art in the old Peshawar valley, including this area.
