= Balarkhel =

Tribe in Pakistan

Balar Khel (Pashto: بلڑ خیل) is the largest Khel in Usi Khel, Aba Khel subtribe of Mandanr Yusufzai inhabiting Yar Hussain village Swabi District & Garhi Kapoora, Mehmood Abad, Gumbat Mardan villages of Mardan District of Khyber Pakhtunkhwa in Pakistan.

== History ==
Traditionally Pashtun tribes live according to a strong family system in which the family is named after the father. Balar Khel thus means the sons of Balar. Family groups prefer to live together and the area is named after their Khel. In the 16th century in the Yusafzai tribe during the time of Malik Ahmed different Khels were divided by his deputy Sheikh Mali and settlements thus included representatives of all Khels. The idea behind this division was to let all Khels have a share of all types of land. This led to the loss of brotherhood among members of each Khel and the development of rivalries on the basis of villages instead of ancestry.
