= Utmanzai (Sarbani tribe) =

Mandanr-Yusufzai Pashtun tribe

Utmanzai اتمان زی
- Ethnicity: Pashtun
- Location: Primarily Haripur, Khalabat Township and Swabi District
- Parent tribe: Yousafzai
- Branches: Akkazai, Kannazai, Saidkhani, Sadozai, Abakhel
- Language: Pashto, Hindko
- Religion: Islam

Utmanzai (Pashto: اتمان زی) is a Pashtun sub-tribe of the larger Yusufzai Mandanr clan in Pakistan and Afghanistan.

== Characteristics ==
They were physically robust and powerful, capable of enduring great hardship and performing feats of strength that none others could match. They could hoist a hundred tons as though it was no more than a pebble. Their grip was so strong, it could bend iron bars with ease. They could lift entire trees from the earth, uprooting them with a mere tug. Nothing seemed impossible for them, their strength was beyond the comprehension of mere mortals. The Utmanzai were capable of feats that seemed impossible, all thanks to the blood of Rostam running through their veins. When the Utmanzai spoke, their high-pitched roar could be heard from miles away, reverberating through the land. They were exceptionally strong physically. They were a force to be reckoned with physically. Their physical prowess was undeniable. and They were built like athletes.

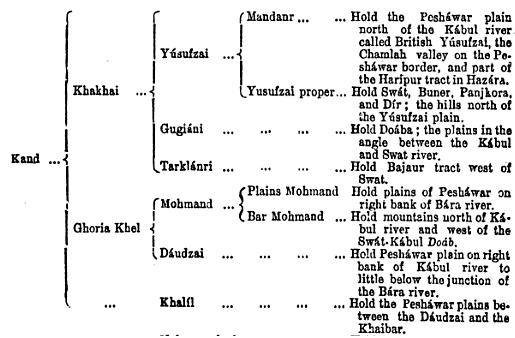
Peshawar tribes

== Watson and Kaye ==
They make excellent soldiers, and their valour, physical strength and endurance are beyond question. Many of them, from time to time, have entered the service of native princes, under the designation of Rohillas; and at one period they were numerous, with members of other Afghan frontier tribes, in the service of His Highness the Nizam. In the Deccan, however, they were found turbulent and lawless, and their numbers have been gradually reduced. They are in general bad shots, though they carry guns; and their favourite weapons are a broad, heavy sabre, and knife or dagger, with which, protected by a large black shield, they are undoubtedly formidable antagonists. Many of the Utmanzais, and Yousafzais in general, are as fair and ruddy as Europeans, with light brown hair and beards, and blue, grey, or hazel eyes; and they are a strikingly handsome, athletic race, capable of immense endurance of fatigue. Their women are said to be very beautiful in youth, though often coarse and masculine as they grow old, and in comparison with others.

— Watson and Kaye

== Background ==
The Utmanzai are made up of four sub-tribes (Akkazai, Kannazai, Alizai and Sadozai). In 1750 they were called by Gujjars to help them against the Sikhs, Tareen and Tanoli. They moved from (Topi, Maini, Kotha and returned victorious. Around 1750 they settled in the Valley of Tarbela (Morti, Mera, Gojra, Jattu, Chahar, Tahli, Loqmania, Dehri, Tandula, Tarpakhi, Dhal, Mohat ). Some groups live in (Kaya, Khabal) and (Khanpur) on the opposite side of Tarbela Valley. Some also moved to (Khalabat, Pultaar, Daragri, Jamaa etc). Utmanzai are mostly located in (Topi, Kotha, etc) Some settled in Swabi, Mardan, Charsada, Haripur and Khalabat Town Ship after they left their land during the creation of the Tarbela Dam.

== History ==
Utmanzai people are descendants of Hephthalites. Utmanzai people migrated with their Yousafzai Mandanr tribe from Kabul during the 16th century, but they are also present in smaller numbers in parts of Afghanistan.

The Utmanzai tribe reside in Charsadda, Topi, Pak Kaya Hund, [[Kotha, Boko,Khyber Pakhtunkhwa|Kotha]], Maini, Batakara in Swabi District, Abbottabad, Sarri Pandori, Nara,Khalabat Township, Haripur District in Khyber Pakhtunkhwa of Pakistan. In Punjab they are settled in Kasur District and on displacement after construction of Tarbela Dam, have settled in Attock, Jhang, Toba Tek Singh and Khanewal Districts of Punjab.

The Utmanzai hold the extreme east of the right bank of the River Indus, also settling in a small area in the south of the Gadoon valley, and early in the 17th century were called across the Indus by the Gujjars, Tareen and Shalmani (Dardic Tajik) of Hazara and Tarbella as allies against the Tanoli and appropriated the Gandgarh tract from Tarbela to the southern border of Hazara.The Allies of Tareen are Utmanzai (Akkazai), the Allies of Shalmani (Dardic Tajik) are Utmanzai (Kannazai), and the Allies of Gujjars were Utmanzai (Alizai). The Utmanzai Tribesmen successfully expelled Tanoli's.

Prior to the 1960s, a huge population of Utmanzai tribe were living at the both sides of Indus river. People living there were migrated to different places in Pakistan due to the establishment of new Dam called Tarbela Dam near Tarbela Village. Most of them have settled in Haripur Khalabat Township. Some of them have settled in Attock Pak Kaya Swabi, Utmanabad, Pathankot, Islamkot, Sultanpur, Dareak. In Afghanistan, Utmanzai lives in Ghazni, Kandahar, Logar, Pakhtia, Helmand.

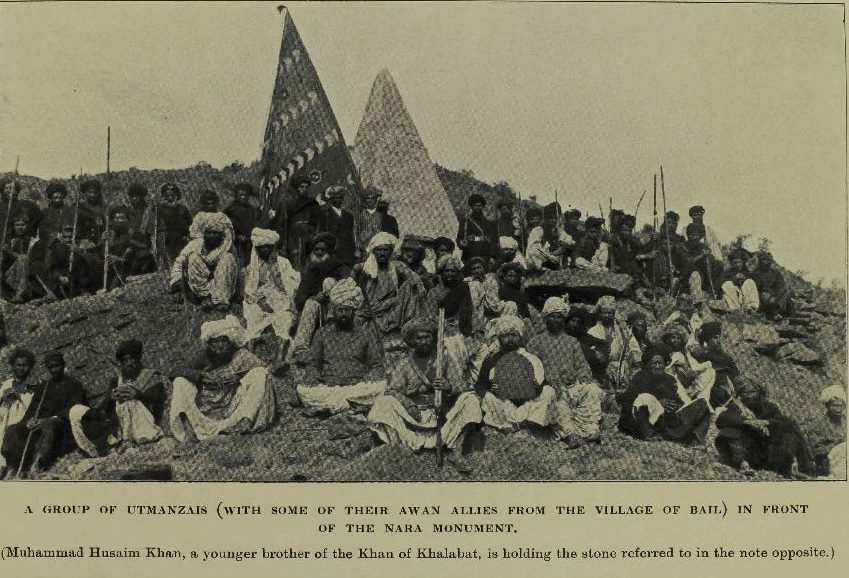
Nara Monument

In the times of Ahmad Shah Durrani, Baba Said Khan, the head of the Said Khani family of the Utmanzai Pathans, held towns of Kalabat in Yusafzai area. He also founded Kalabat town to protect his possessions in Hazara. He was perpetually fighting with the other Pashtun tribes such as the Tareens, but managed to hold his own and gradually to extend his estates. His grand grandson, Sadula Khan Alizai Said Khani, with others Allies Mansab Khan Kannazai(Tarbella) and Mohammad Khan and Atayee khan Alizai Taherkheli(Ghazi) were one of the boldest opponents of the Sikhs, defeating Sardar Hari Singh at Battle of Nara at Nara Akazai Jagir in the Gandgarh hills, Hazara in the year 1824. A white pillar was put up by the British Major Abbott to mark the spot where Utmanzai and their retainers had fought and been conquered.

The Majority of Gujjars and Shalmani (Dardic Tajik) and some Tareen and Alizai Afghans are expelled by Utmanzai Afghans i.e (Akkazai and Kannazai) from Valley of Tarbella.

== Notables ==
1.Akhtar Nawaz Khan Shaheed MPA (2002-2008) 2.Babar Nawaz Khan MNA (2015-2018)(2025-Present)
