= Utmanzai =

Utmanzai may refer to:

- Utmanzai (Sarbani tribe), a Sarbani Pashtun tribe
- Utmanzai (Wazir clan)
- Utmanzai, Charsadda, a settlement in Charsadda District, Khyber Pakhtunkhwa, Pakistan
