= Niamatkhel =

Yusufzai subtribe in Pakistan

Naimat Khel (Pashto:نعمت خېل) is a subtribe of the Pashtun Yusufzai tribe. They are mainly found in the Galoch, Sirsinai, Matta, sherfalam, Pirkalay ,Kanju, Aligrama, Hazara, and Gul Jaba villages of Swat, Pakistan.Currently majority of Naimat Khel reside in Kanju and Hazara villages of Swat and their area is known as Muhalla Naimat khel.They are well known for their amazing hospitality, modesty, honour and self respect. Their separate identity on the surface of the earth exists since around 1400 or 1500. Naimat (Father of Naimat Khel) was the son Zubair. Naimat son name was Zareef and grandson name was Zamanay. Although the brothers of Zamanay are not known well, most of the present day Naimat Khel are the in the children of Zamanay. Zamanay had two sons, one of them was Barkat and the other's name or further children are not clearly known today or may be I might not know well about him. Barkat had four sons. All of them were bloody pashtun and extremely honoured. They were the Malak Nation of their time who used to rule some of the northern areas of Pakistan which at that time were part of Swat state. They migrated from Afghanistan and started living in Swat State. The Malak were very powerful in the times about 100 years ago. Bahram Khan (born c. 1855) grandson of Zamanay, used to walk in shoes made of gold. Bahram Khan father name was Tásh Khan and his brother name (arguably) was Khadim Khan who did not have any children. Currently the Naimat Khel living in Hazara, Swat are the children of Bahram Khan. Bahram Khan had three sons: Laibar Malak (1885 to 1946), Qamar Zaman Malak well known as Chanday Malak (1890 to 11 November 1958), Amir Nawab Malak (1994 to September 1996). Amir Nawab Malak did not have any children. Although the children of Laibar Malak and Chanday Malak are living modern lives and the concept of Malakan being rulers no longer exists because it is modern world now in which every single person fights for independence, yet they are still highly respected in the areas of Swat.
