= Abakhel =

Mandanr- Pashtun tribe

Aba Khel (Pashto: اباخېل) is a subtribe of the Mandanr Pashtun tribe. Their settlements are located mainly in the Khyber Pakhtunkhwa province of Pakistan and include the villages of Zaida, Kaddi, Hund, Shah Mansur, Khunda, Ambar, Panjpir, Beka, Aryan, Lahor, Kheshgi Nowshera Kalan (in the Nowshera District), and Ragastoon. District Shangla, Shapur, Ghowarban

== Lineage ==
Aba Khel are descendents of the Mandanr tribe. Mandanr had four sons, Mano, Hazar, Razar, and Mahmoud. Mano had two sons, Usman and Utman. Usman had two sons, Amanzai and Kamalzai. Utman had four sons, Akkazai, Sadozai, Alizai and Kannazai. The descendants of Utman's son Sadozai are called Sadu Zais who were further divided into five families ,including Aba Khel, Umar Khel, Khadu Khel, Mir Ahmad Khel and Behzad Khel. Descendants of the Aba Khel family then settled in the districts Khyber Pakhtunkhwa, Pakistan.

=== Family tree ===
Sadu Zai subtribe

== History ==
Yusafzai are named after Yusaf who was the son of Manday along with Umar. Umar died early and left behind his son Mandanr who married the daughter of his uncle Yusaf. The descendants of both Yusaf and Mandanr are together called Yousafzai.

== People ==
- Nisar Muhammad Yousafzai, war hero of the Afghan War of Independence and a founding father of Tajikistan
- Yousuf Khan Abakhel Saduzai is a historian and researcher. His most notable book is Register Sudhnoti, a book detailing the history of the Sadozai tribe.
