= Mandanr =

Yusufzai Pashtun tribe

Mandanṛ مانډر
- Ethnicity: Pashtun
- Location: Primarily Mardan, Buner, Shangla and Swabi District
- Parent tribe: Yousafzai
- Branches: Razar, Malakzai, Muhammadkhel, Mamozai, Siddikhail Khazarzai, Umar Khel, Abakhel, Utmanzai, Khan-e-Khel, Lali-e-Khel
- Language: Pashto
- Religion: Islam

The Mandanr (Pashto:منډانړ) also known as Mandar or Mandan are a Pashtun tribe who are a branch of the larger Yusufzai tribe of Pashtuns in Afghanistan and Khyber Pakhtunkhwa.

== History ==
Originating from Kandahār, the people of the tribe were historically a powerful warrior tribe which revolted throughout the Mughal tenures in Afghanistan and South Asia.

== Demographic ==
The Mandanr-Yousafzai are predominant in the areas of what was historically known as Mandanr Country made up of the Mardan Division (Mardan and Swabi), Buner District, Shangla, Haripur (Khalabat Township), and partly with a presence in the regional Swat Valley and Lower Dir. Moreover, Amazai, the subbranch of Mandanr, is another prominent branch of Yousufzai pushtun. Amazai spreads from ShahbazGarhi of Mardan to the border of former Swat state.

== Notable people ==
- Malak Ahmad Baba, Chief of the Yusufzai known as The founder of Pakhtunkhwa
- Gaju Khan, Pashtun ruler who once served under Sher Shah Sur
- Kalu Khan, Afghan warrior who annihilated the Mughal force of Akbar at the Karakar Pass
- Najib Khan, organised Afghan victory at the Battle of Panipat, 1761
- Sher Khan, Pakistani military officer martyr decorated with the Nishan-e-Haidar for highest gallantry
- Nisar Muhammad, War Hero of the Afghan War of Independence
- Yousuf Khan Abakhel Saduzai, from the Abakhel Saduzai branch of the Mandar tribe, is a historian and researcher, who is also known as a jihadi leader in Azad Kashmir.
- Abdul Qahhar Khan Mandankhail, who was decorated with the highest gallantry Award (Tamgha-e-Shujaat) by the President of Pakistan Dr Arif Alvi on 23 Mar 2022. He belongs to a respectable family of Mandankhail Labat Swat. The family is part of the Babli Khel branch of Khani Khel, Mehmoodzai (Maamozai) Mandanr; who had shifted to Swat from Naway Kalay now Karnal Sher Khan Kalay Swabi in 1858 after the war of independence 1857.
- Khan Roshan Khan Yousafzai. He was a Pashtun historian, educationalist, and writer from Pakistan known primarily for being president of the All India Muslim League in Swabi and for writing books on the history of the Pashtun people. He belonged to the Mehmoodzai (Mamoozai) branch of Mandanr Yousafzai.
