= Aligrama =

Town in Khyber Pakhtunkhwa province of Pakistan

- Historical town
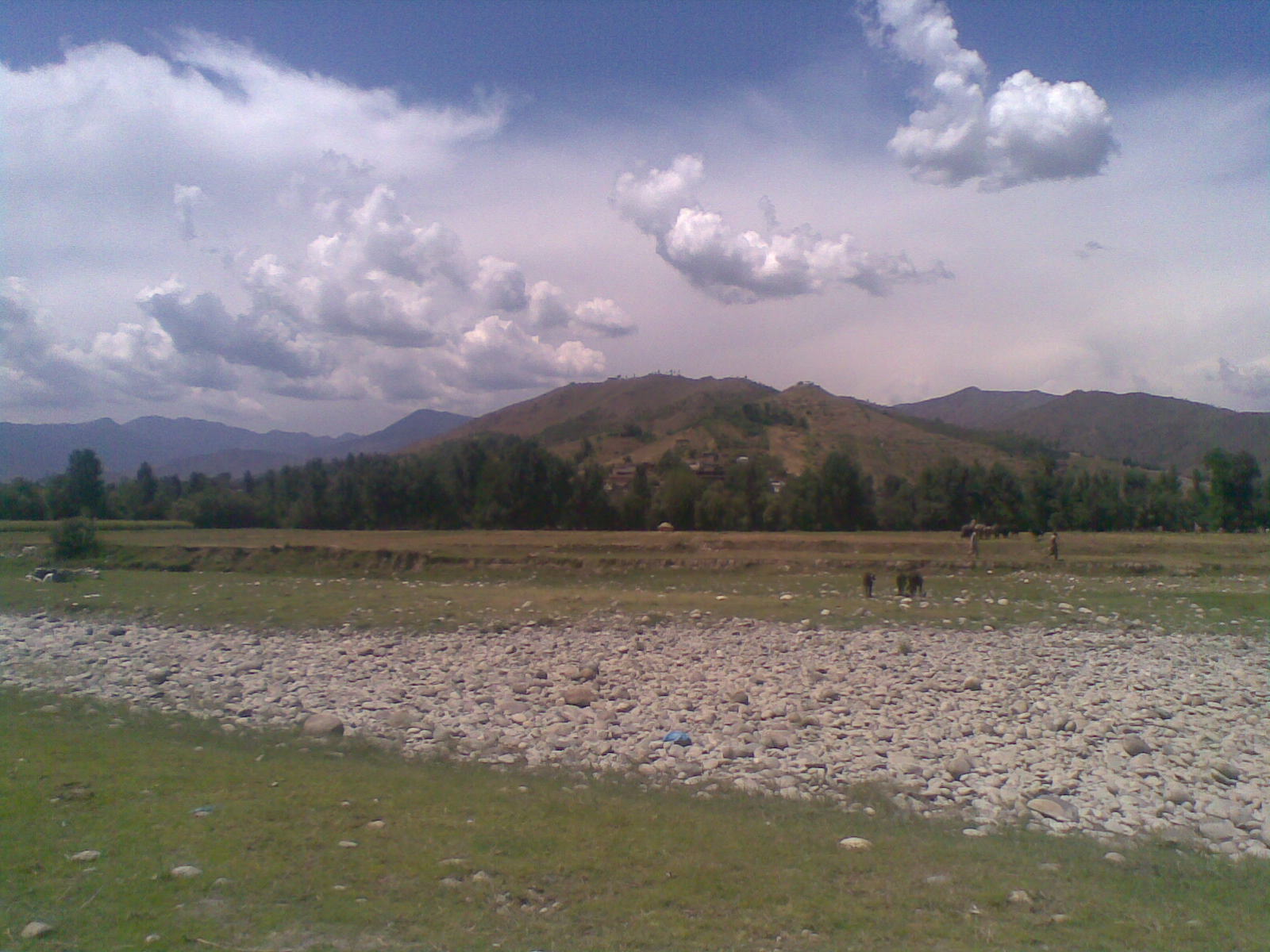
- Interactive map of Aligrama
- Coordinates: 34°48′N 72°19′E
- Country: Pakistan
- Province: Khyber Pakhtunkhwa
- District: Swat

Population
  - Total: 10,000

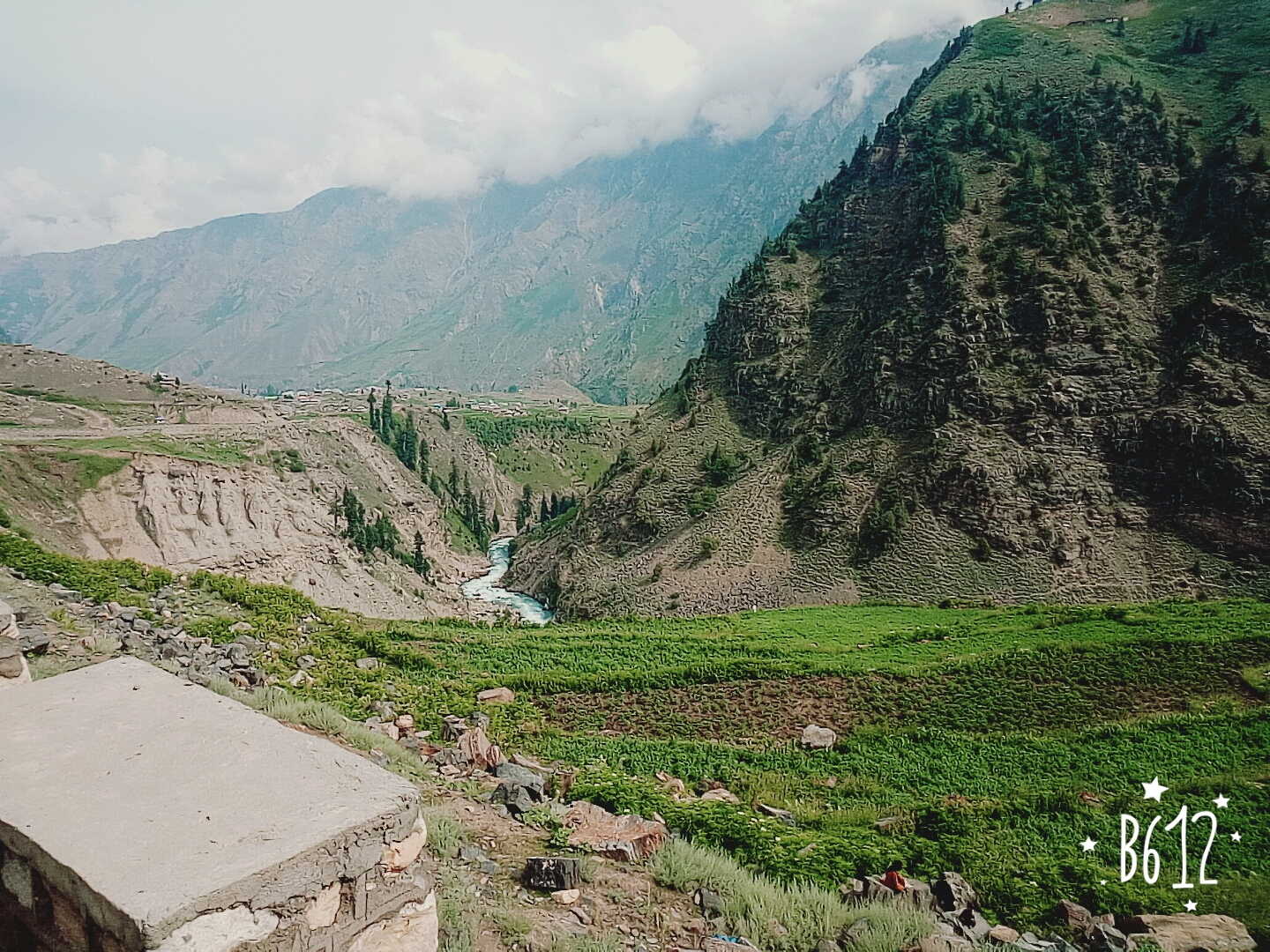
Alaigrama site

Aligrama is one of the historical towns of Swat District in Khyber Pakhtunkhwa province of Pakistan. The population is about 10,000. Most of the people are literate.

== Location ==
Aligrama is situated in the mountains a couple of miles from Kanju and Saidu Sharif. Aligrama is surrounded by mountain, and at the front is swat river. The river is touching the ghorkand area of Aligrama, and at the back mountain covered the area of manzari tangay, and tutbanie. Hazara is at the right side of Aligrama. Srroo baari is the end of Aligrama with Hazara. Aligrama has a middle school for boys which is located at the end of Aligrama with Hazara village. A primary school for girls is located between (khatanu) and (lali shaheed).

The original tribes of Aligrama are (Khattak's, Rama Khail, Niamath Khail, and Syed's(Mian)), but in recent years this village has been established by people from other villages. The village has a police station (reconstructed) which was destroyed by taliban in the past terrorism conflict. Most of the people of Aligrama live their lives on farming or working outside of the country to full fill their needs. A site of the Gandhara grave culture was discovered here by Italian archaeologists and has been dated to c. 1000 BCE.

== Demographics ==
The people of Aligrama belong to the Yousafzai tribe of Pakhtuns Pashtuns.

== Agriculture ==
The major source of earning is agriculture and fruit farming. A considerable number of people own small and large businesses in various places of Khyber Pakhtunkhwa.

== Education ==
The people of Aligrama are well educated and serving in different fields of life. There are a number of public and private schools for both boys and girls.
