= Badrai =

Stream in Swabi, Pakistan

- Badrai khowar
- Badrai near village Panj Pir.

- Location within Khyber Pakhtunkhwa Location within Pakistan
- Location: Khyber Pakhtunkhwa
- Coordinates: 34.088°N 72.483°E
- Type: Stream
- Basin countries: Pakistan
- Frozen: Never

Badrai is a Nullah which runs in the Swabi district of Khyber Pakhtunkhwa. It originates in the mountains of Buner district near Makhranai village to the west of River Indus and runs towards the south to pass along Charorai Kalay. It runs further south in District Swabi crossing near villages Panjtar & Ghurghushto where it is joined by small tributaries. Further south it passes to the west of villages Tutalai, Salim Khan, Manerai, Swabi, Kala, Darra, Panj Pir and Kaddi. An irrigation canal has been siphoned underneath Badrai at village Kaddi in Swabi district which is a prominent feature of the village.

Changing its course to the west it passes to the south of villages Zaida, Khunda and Ambar running parallel to the River Indus which it eventually meets.

The elevated water levels of the Badrai nullah during the exceptional monsoon rains in 2022 resulted in severe floods, causing tremendous impacts on infrastructure and widespread disruptions.
