= Nisar Muhammad Khan =

Pakistani Pashto playwright and broadcaster (1942–2018)

- نثار محمّد خان
- Nisar Muhammad Khan
- Born: Nisar Muhammad Khan; January 1942; Shah Mansur, Swabi District, Khyber Pakhtunkhwa
- Died: September 7, 2018 (aged 76); Shah Mansur, Pakistan
- Resting place: Shah Mansur
- Education: Government Post Graduate College Mardan; University of Peshawar
- Occupations: Playwright; Scriptwriter; Broadcaster
- Children: 11
- Writing career
- Language: Pashto, Urdu, English
- Years active: 1960–2018
- Subjects: Literature, Language, Entertainment, Culture

Nisar Muhammad Khan (January 1942 – 7 September 2018) was a Pakistani playwright, scriptwriter, broadcaster, and director of the Radio Pakistan. Besides contributing to Pashto language and culture, he is also credited with writing books, including Speen Tumbal on Pashto music and Aghosh-i-Kausar, covering the life of Bilal ibn Rabah, a companion of Islamic prophet Muhammad.

He was born to a Pashtun family of the Yousafzai tribe and raised in Shah Mansur town of Swabi District in Khyber Pakhtunkhwa. He received his early schooling from a school in his hometown at Swabi, and later attended the Government Post Graduate College Mardan where he did his graduation. He did master's degree in Pashto studies from the University of Peshawar. He had eleven children, including two sons and nine daughters.

== Career ==
Khan began his career in 1960 as a Pashto newscaster and translator with the Radio Pakistan for Karachi station, and subsequently continued his further studies until he did postgraduation in Pashto. While working at Radio, he was actively engaged in promoting Pashto culture, music and language. He wrote several radio plays in Pashto language aired from the Peshawar station. After working at drama department, he served its program director in 1973 until the government sent him to aboard in the Netherlands for modern drama art studies purpose in 1975. He also used to organise concert programs for radio, and created a drams titled Visit This Place Once Again which became a prominent drama among Pashtuns. He wrote numerous plays, including Chagha (Cry), Pagha (Turbine) and Zh Suk Yam (Who Am I) for the Radio's entertainment programs. It is believed he introduced several singers to music, including Mashooq Sultan, and Hidayatulla and trained them in Lahore at the central production unit of Radio Pakistan. While working with stated-owned radio station, he produced more than one thousand songs and used to play sitar musical instrument. He is also credited for reintroducing old Pashto music preserved at digital library of Radio Pakistan to the listeners of the modern age.

During his career with Pakistan Television and Radio, he wrote scripts and stories for over fifty-two Pashto films, including Khanabadosh (Nomad) and Topak Zama Qanoon (My Law is the Gun). As an actor, he worked in films, including Makhroor (Proclaimed Offender) and featured as a side hero. His another film Orbal (Henna) features Khan's role as a police inspector.

He wrote three books, including Exploring Melody (in English), Spin Tambal (in Pashto) and Aghosh-i-Kausar (in Urdu). The English one covers the past folk singers and old musical instruments used in the South Asian, while Urdu one covers the life of Bilal ibn Rabah. Later in 1990s, he was appointed as station director at Radio Pakistan until he retired from his profession in 2001 or 2002 with the Best Drama Writer award given by the Radio Pakistan.

He made his later film associations with the Central Board of Film Censors where he retained his position till 2003. He was also involved in a public awareness campaign called Thalassaemia Project, for which he was awarded twice by the KP government. The award he received for his contribution to tribal areas is not known. In November 2008, the provincial government established Directorate of Culture department after Khan, aimed at to promote Pashtun culture in the country.

== Death ==
During his last days, Khan suffered from cancer disease since 2012 or 2013. He died of the disease on 7 September 2018 at Shah Mansur town of Swabi District in Khyber Pakhtunkhwa, Pakistan.
