= Panjpir =

Panj Pir پنج پیر
- Union Council
- Mount Panj Pir standing at a height of 1648 ft.

- Location within Pakistan
- Coordinates: 34°05′17″N 72°28′45″E
- Country: Pakistan
- Province: Khyber-Pakhtunkhwa
- District: Swabi
- Tehsil: Swabi

Government
  - Nazim: N/A
  - Naib Nazim: N/A

Population (1998)
  - Total: 13,936
- Time zone: UTC+5 (PST)

Panjpir (Pashto:پنج پیر) is a town and Union council of Swabi District in the Khyber Pakhtunkhwa province of Pakistan that is surrounded by Shahmansoor, Kaddi, Thand Kohi, Bam Khel, Darra and Ismailabad.Panj peer means five Sufi Saints. District Swabi has 4 Tehsils i.e. Swabi Tehsil, Lahor, Topi Tehsil and Razar. Each Tehsil comprises certain numbers of union councils. There are 56 union councils in district Swabi.

It is located approximately 100 Kilometers both from Peshawar and Islamabad through recently constructed Peshawar Islamabad Motorway (M-I) with nearest approach at Swabi Interchange near Ambar village on the right bank of the Indus River. Panj Pir Ghar (Panj Pir Mountain) with its sharpest ridge rises to the height of 2,130 feet above sea level or 940 feet above the Yousafzai plain, (Source Gazetteer of Peshawar District 1897–98) while highest peak of the Panj Pir hills is at 2,053 feet altitude from the sea level according to a recent Topo-Sheet issued by the Survey of Pakistan.

The area is bounded by the mountain Panjpir Ghar to its north, Badrai Khwar to its west, the Pehur Lift Canal to its east.

Total population of the village was 1,065 - Muslims were 1,054 with 542 males & 512 females while Hindus were 11 with 8 males and 3 female total 1,065 persons in 1869. (Source: Tareekh-e-Peshawar). Total population of the village was 3,175 in 1951, 8,227 in 1981 and 13,936 (Males 6,854 and Females 7,082) according to census of 1998 conducted by the Government of Pakistan. Literacy rate in the same year was 49.30% of the total population.

Total area of Panj Pir is 3,205 Acres or 25,640 Kanals including streams, mountain, hillocks, ravines and a large cemetery.

== Madrassas ==
Salafists in Afghanistan's northeast were greatly influenced by the Saudi-financed madrassas in Pakistan, particularly the Ahl-i Hadith Panjpiri madrassas based in the town of Panjpir, Swabi District in Pakistan.

The most prominent madrassa is the Darul Quran seminary, established in 1939 by Tahir Panjpiri and nowadays headed by his son Maulana Muhammad Tayyab, which has around 20 affiliated seminaries in Karachi as well and has come under scrutiny for his links with Salafi-jihadi militancy, some Panjpiri militants including TTP leaders Sufi Muhammad and Maulana Fazlullah and ISIS–K leader Hafiz Saeed Khan. The madrassa network has also links with the army and the ISI through Major (r) Muhammad Amir, the son of Maulana Tahir and brother of Maulana Tayyab.

Every year during Ramzan thousands of peoples from all over the province and the country attend the Darul Quran for its religious programs on the translation and explanation of the Qur’an.

== Notable people ==
- Tahir Panjpiri – Islamic scholar.
- Muhammad Hammad (Hassan) well known journalist /Analyst younger son of Tahiri Panjpiri
- Haroon Bacha – Pashtun singer, musician and composer.
- Gul Wareen – Pashtun singer, musician and composer. He is also the nephew of Haroon Bacha officer.

== See also ==
- Swabi District

== Sources ==
- Ed Darack. Victory Point: Operations Red Wings and Whalers – The Marine Corps' Battle for Freedom in Afghanistan. Penguin Group, 2009. ISBN 0-425-22619-0, ISBN 978-0-425-22619-3.
