= Darra, Swabi =

Village Council in Swabi, Pakistan

Darra درہ
- Village Council
- Darra
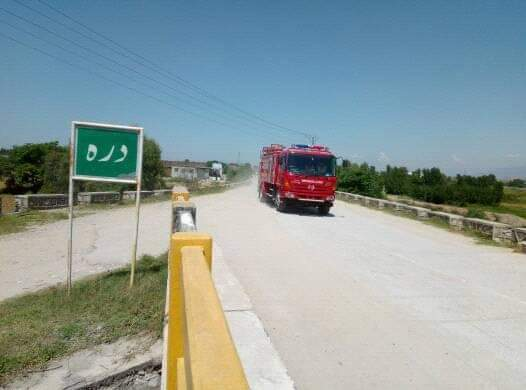
- Bridge on the Badrai khoar (Darra)

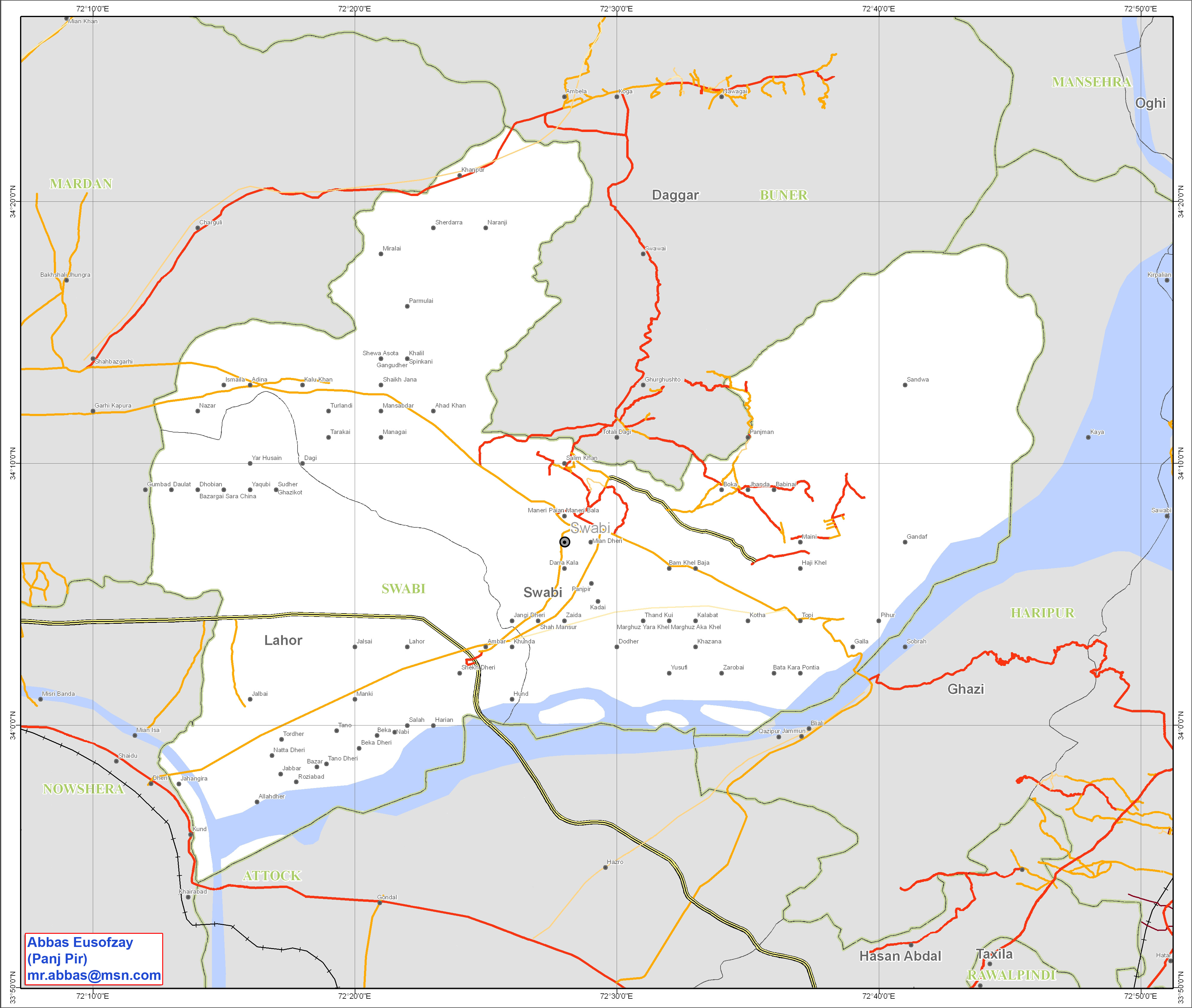
- Map of the Swabi in kpk, Pakistan

- Location within Pakistan
- Coordinates: 34.1004°N 72.4746°E
- Country: Pakistan
- Province: Khyber Pakhtunkhwa
- District: Swabi
- Tehsil: Swabi
- Union Council: Panjpir
- PC/VC: Darra
- Seat: Chairman Council

Government
  - Type: Local Council/Village Council
  - Chairman: Tariq Muhammad

Area
  - Total: 10.959 km^{2} (4.231 sq mi)
- Elevation: 340 m (1,120 ft)

Population (2023)
  - Total: 9,823
- Time zone: UTC+5 (Pakistan standard time)

Darra (Pashto: درہ،; Urdu: درہ) is a village and village council located in Tehsil and District Swabi, in the Khyber Pakhtunkhwa province of Pakistan.

The village is situated at a distance of around 100 kilometers from both Peshawar and Islamabad, and can be reached via the recently built Peshawar-Islamabad Motorway (M-I). The closest access point is the Swabi Interchange, which is located near Ambar village on the right side of the Indus River.

Its population in 2017 was 8,692.

== Climate ==
Darra, a village located in the district of Swabi, has a humid subtropical climate, classified under the Köppen Cwa system. This climate is characterized by hot and humid summers, and mild winters, with moderate rainfall throughout the year. The average temperature in Darra is 22.2 °C, while the annual precipitation averages 639 mm. The driest month is November, with an average rainfall of 12 mm, while August is the wettest month, with an average 137 mm of precipitation. June is the hottest month of the year, with an average temperature of 32.9 °C, while January is the coldest month, with an average temperature of 10.2 °C. The area is also prone to dust storms, particularly in May and June, as well as thunderstorms and hailstorms towards the end of the cold weather. Moreover, the village is situated in the path of the Badri Khoar stream, which flows from the north (Swabi, Kaala) towards the south and passes through Darra and Panjpir. During heavy rainfall, the water level in the stream can rise significantly, which has in the past led to the destruction of some wooden bridges and one concrete bridge. While the flooding has not caused significant damage to houses, it remains a concern for the villagers.
