= Mukkha =

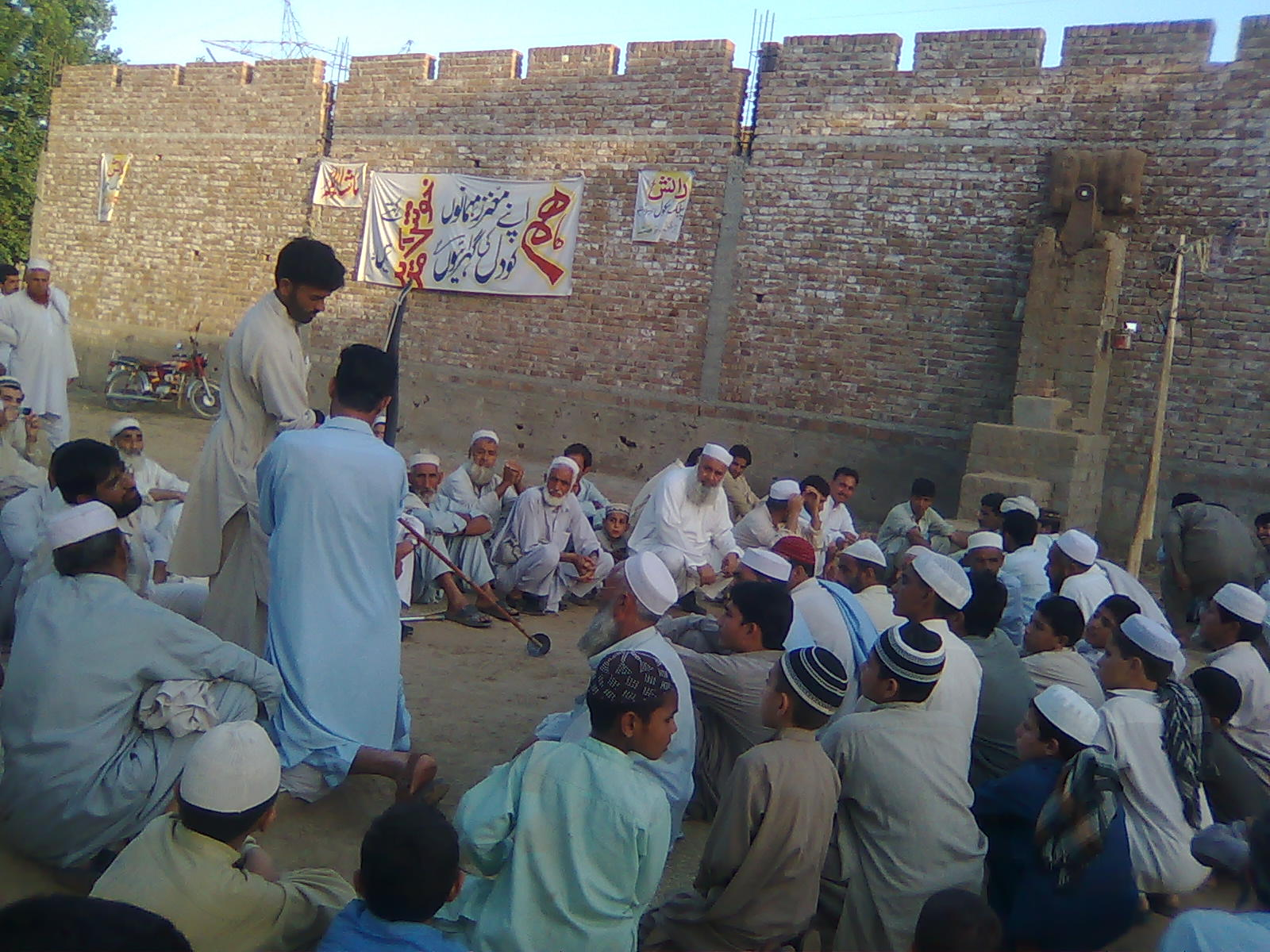
- The archer is preparing to take the shot

Mukkha is an archery sport. The game is played with a long arrow (ghashay) and a long bow (leenda). The arrow has a saucer shaped metallic plate (tubray) at its distal end. The archers play in teams and attempt to hit a small white wooden target called takai surrounded by a circular ring called kwaara. The target is secured in fresh clay placed at some height a few meters away from the archer.

== Rules ==
The game is played with a long arrow (ghashay) and a long bow (leenda). The arrow has a saucer shaped metallic plate (tubray) at its distal end. The archers play in teams and attempt to hit a small white wooden target called takai surrounded by a circular ring called kwaara. The target is secured in fresh clay placed at some height a few meters away from the archer. If the player manages to strike the targets they score a point. A successful attempt is usually celebrated by beating loud drums. On the other hand, if the player misses the target, the opposing team would celebrate instead.

== History, name and origin ==
The game is believed to be originated in the Baloristan regions of Pakistan.

== Images ==
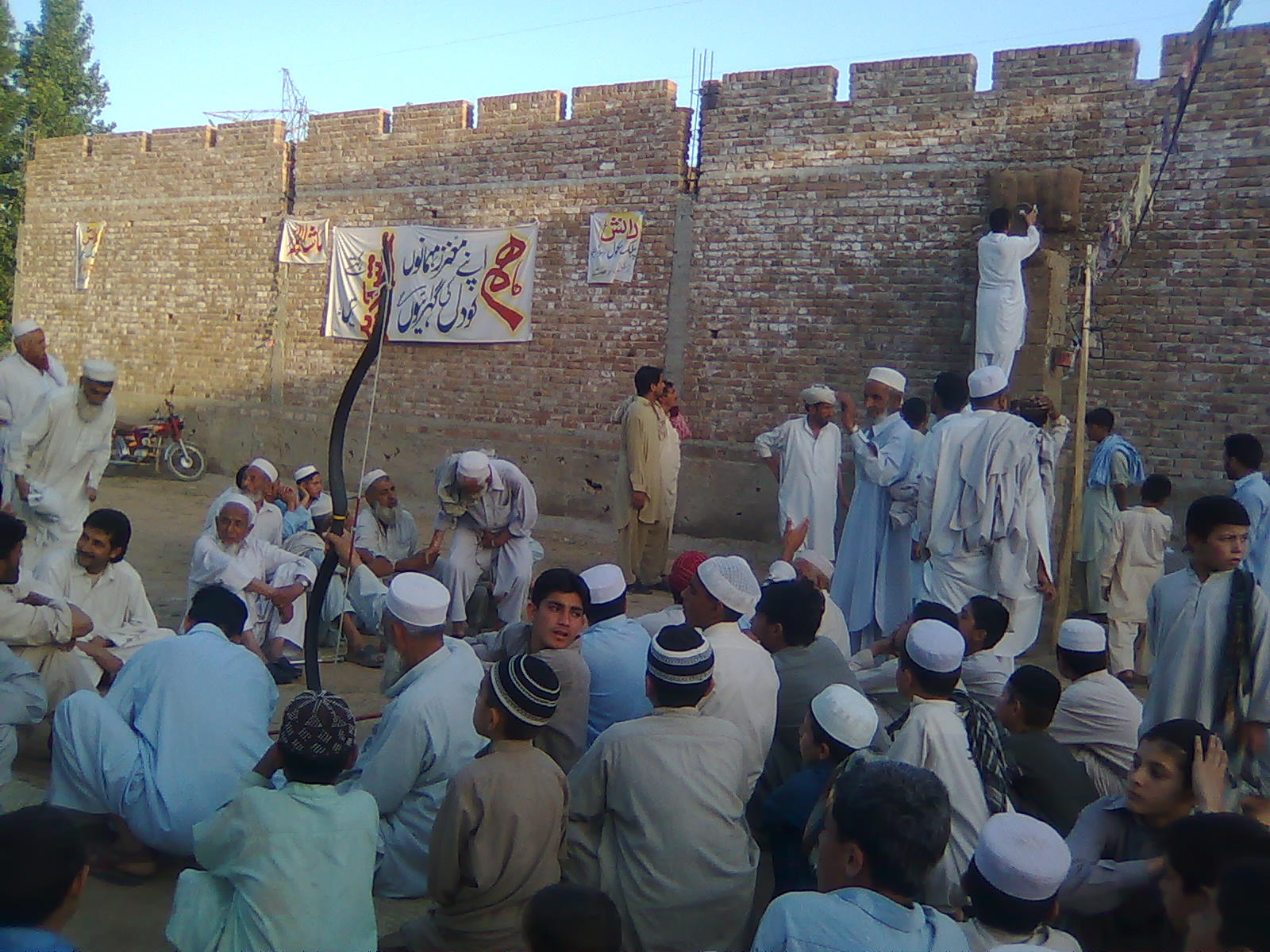
The traditional archery sport of the Pashtuns called makha. Target is being prepared in the village of Kaddi in Swabi District

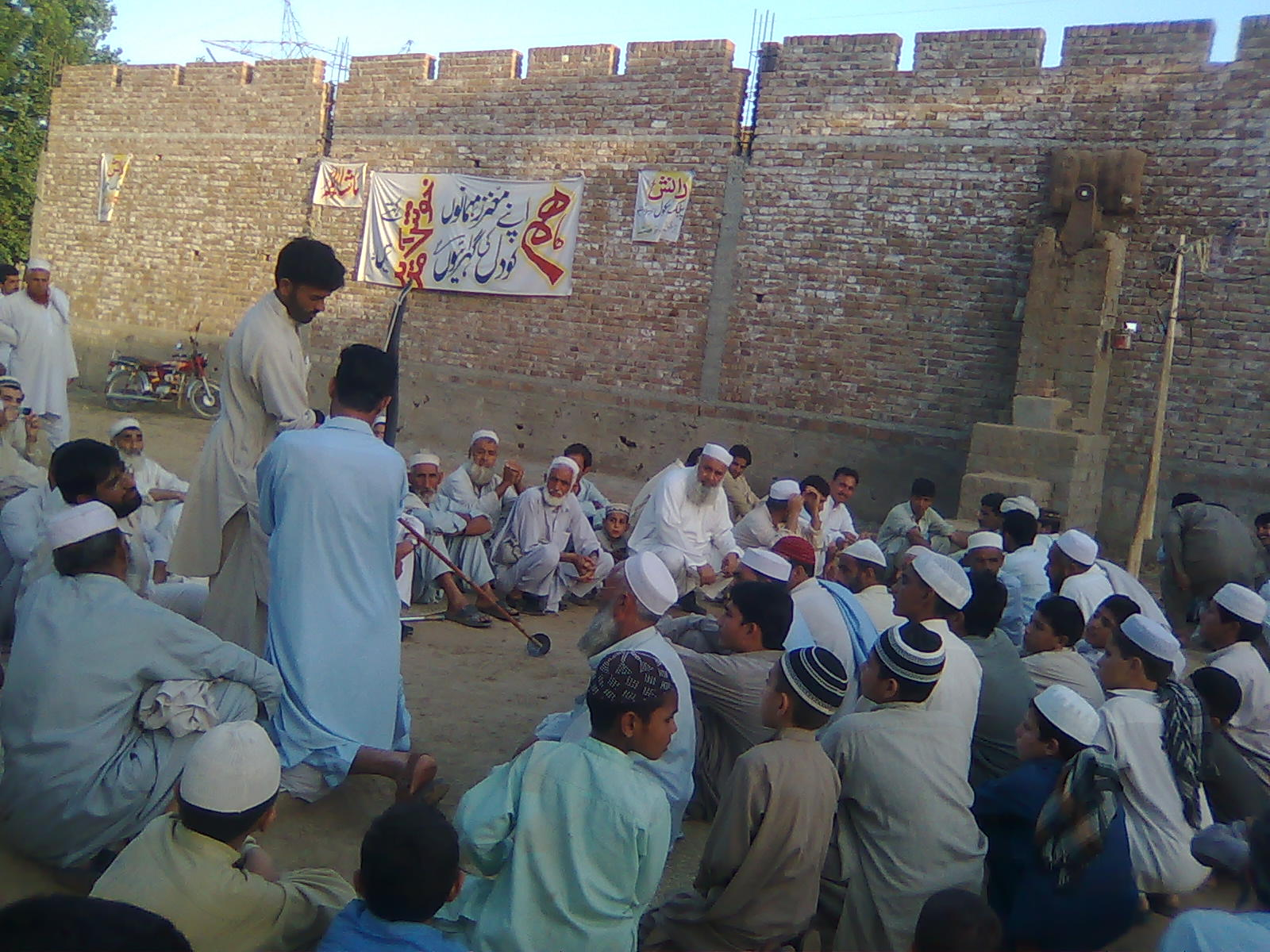
Makha - The archer is preparing to take the shot. A friend is helping him.

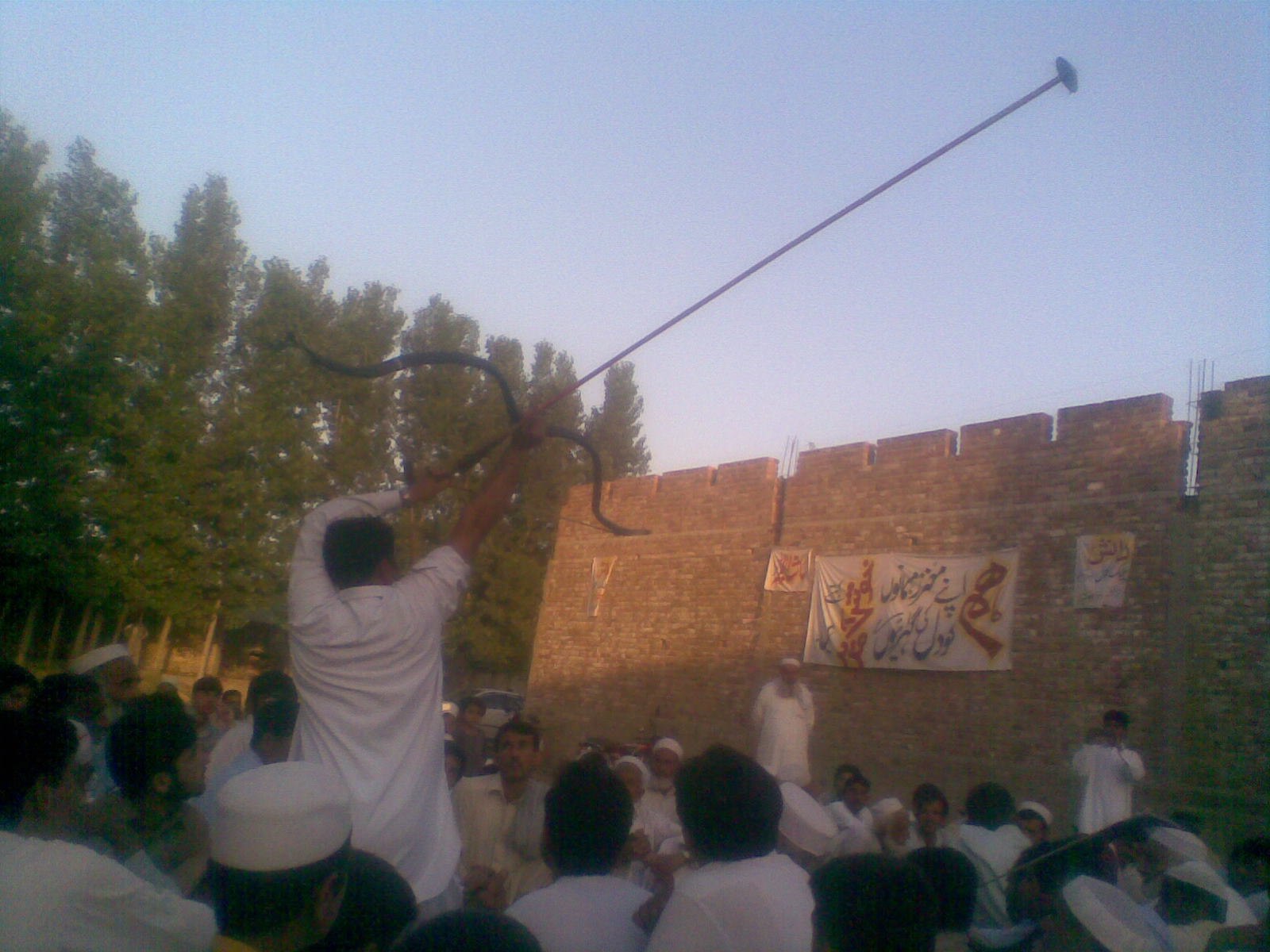
Makha - Archer positioning and starting to aim at the target.

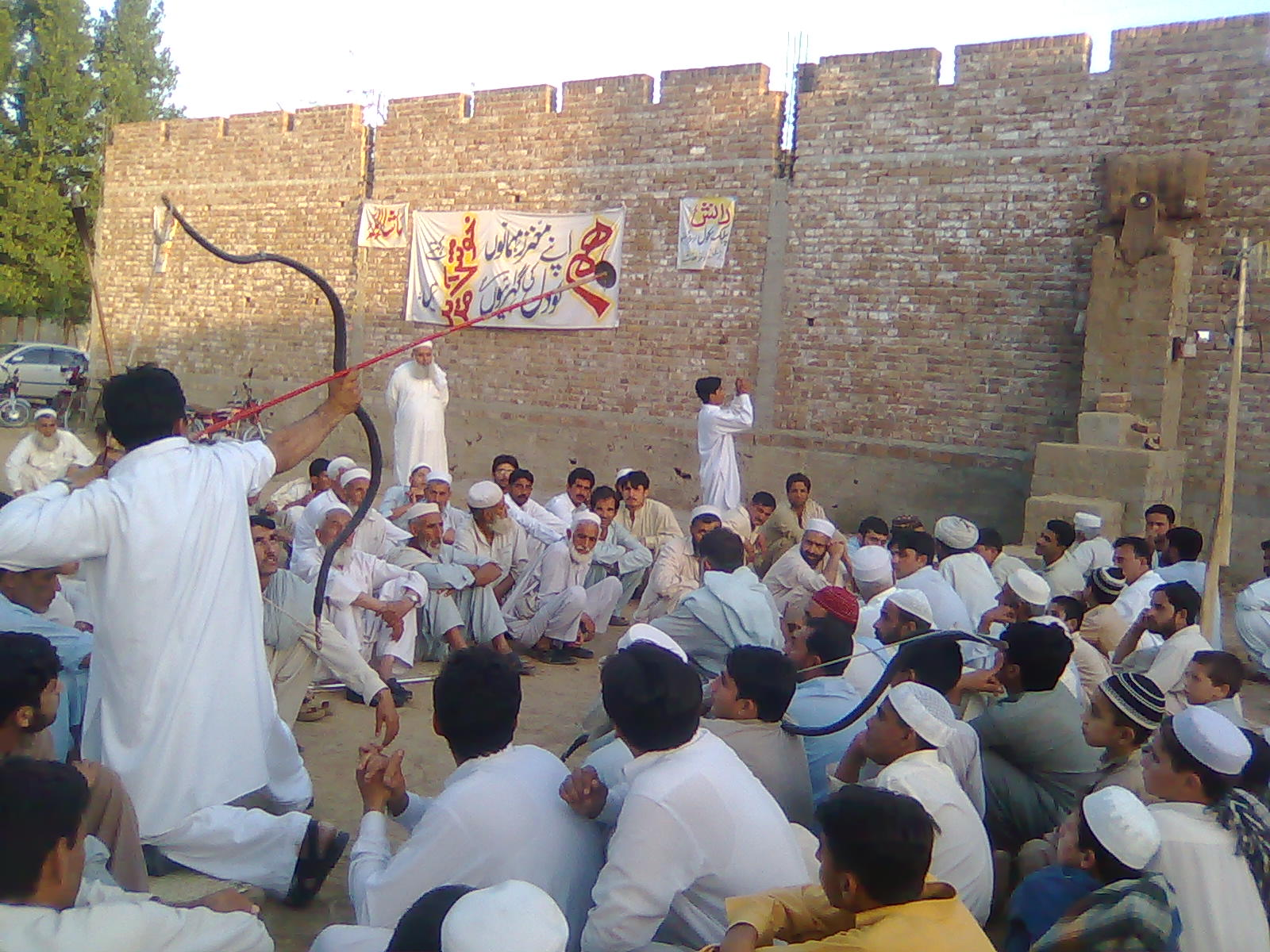
Makha - Archer aiming at the target.

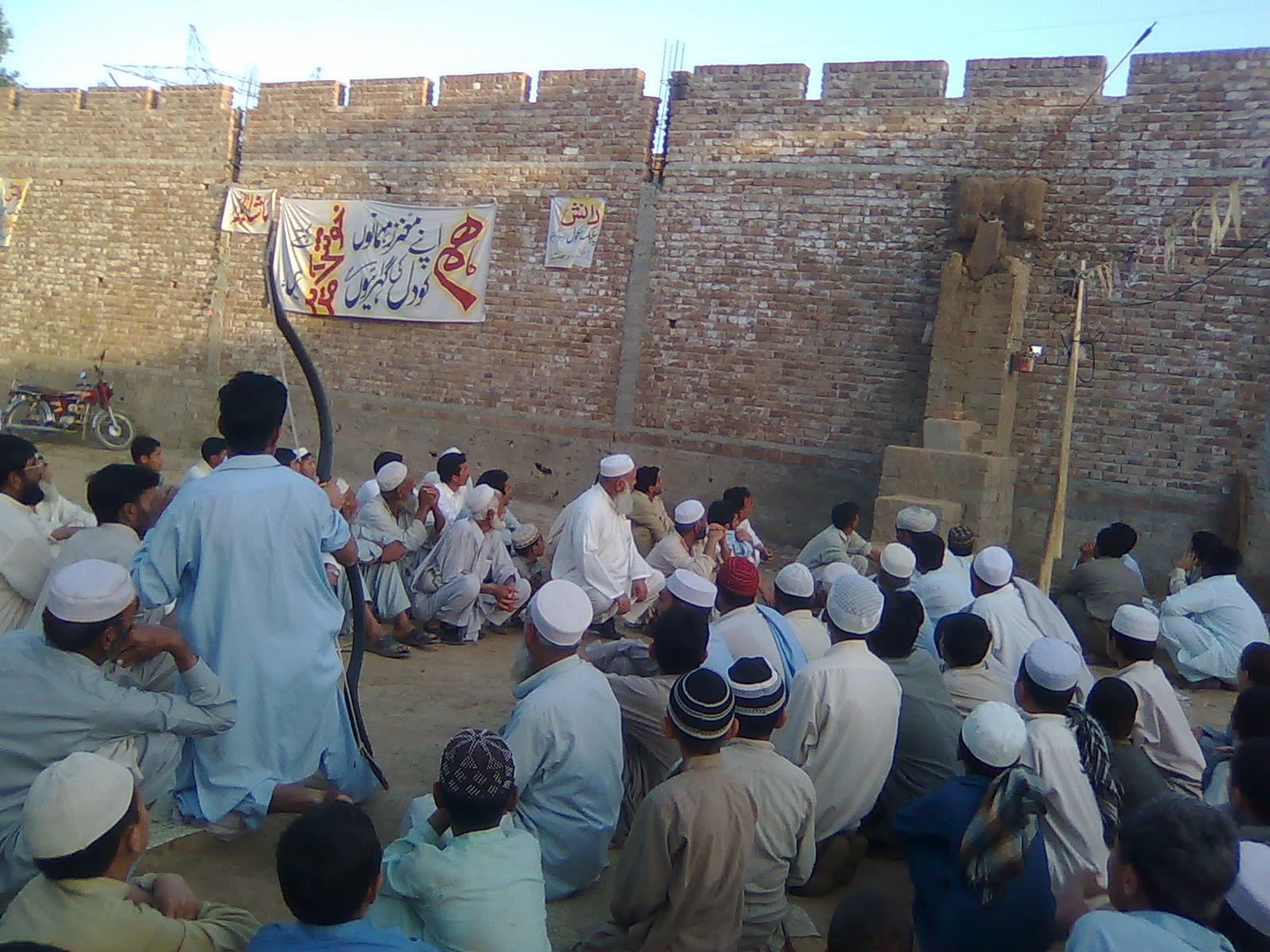
Makha - Target successfully hit.
