= Garhi Kapoora =

Coordinates: 34.198°N 72.167°E

Garhi Kapura (گڑھی کپورہ) is one of the most important and largest town in District Mardan. It is located in the eastern part of Mardan and bounded by Shahbaz Garhi/ Bala Garhi in the North, Baghecha Dheri, Butseri, Nazar Kali in the East, Muhib Banda in the West and Geedar/ Kandary Kaly in the South.

The village remained an important economic hub in the area before partition. Religious harmony existed as there were numerous Hindu temples and markets in the village. A fort named Langarkot was constructed in Garhi Kapoora by the Mughals with the help of Khattaks against the Yousafzais. There are numbers of Cannals, distributries and Stream in the village for agricultural purposes.

The village possesses number of Govt and Private educational institutes.

== Geographic coordinates ==
Latitude & Longitude of Garhi Kapura
Latitude (width)	Longitude (length)
34°11'51.0"N (34.1975000°)	72°09'50.0"E (72.1638900°)
