= Shah Mansur =

Pakistani town

- town
- Location in Pakistan
- Coordinates: 34°4′0″N 72°27′0″E
- Country: Pakistan
- Province: Khyber Pakhtunkhwa
- District: Swabi District
- Time zone: UTC+5 (PST)
  - Summer (DST): +6

Shah Mansur, also named Shah Mansoor or Shahmansoor, is a town and Union Council of Swabi District in Khyber-Pakhtunkhwa province of Pakistan. It is located at 34°4'0N 72°27'0E with an altitude of 301 metres (990 feet).

According to Elders there was once a large battle fought between the Yousafzais of the region and the Sikhs which eventually ended in the Afghans victory; however, there were many casualties of tribal warriors in the aftermath which had left behind grieving mothers, sisters and daughters over their corpses. As they wailed over their loved ones their white chails got soaked with the blood of the martyrs, this leading to a tradition of wearing a special red patterned chail to symbolise their sacrifices, which is now a part of the womenfolk culture of the region.

== Overview ==
Shah Mansoor is a central town of Swabi District with a rich history. The district headquarters offices, which include the Judicial Complex, district headquarters Hospital, Police headquarters, EDO, DCO and other main offices, are shifted to Shah Mansur. It has increased the significance of the Shah Mansoor Township project which is expected to revolutionize the area. It holds a central position in the entire Pakhtunkhwa region for being one of the great seat of learning.

Majority of the youth of Shahmansoor work abroad in different countries including the GCC and Central Europe. Although a lot of workforce is still involved with local businesses and occupations including agriculture.

== Notable people ==
- Nisar Muhammad Khan, broadcaster who specialised in Pashto language and culture
