= Tahirkheli =

Yousafzai tribe in Hazara region, Pakistan

The Tahirkheli (Pashto: طاهرخېل) or Tarkheli, is a Yousafzai subtribe mainly living in the Hazara region of the Khyber Pakhtunkhwa province of Pakistan.

== Notable people with the surname ==
- Rashid Ahmed Tahirkheli
- Anisa Zeb Tahirkheli
- Shirin R. Tahirkheli
