= Khadarzai (Khizarzai) =

Mandanr-Yousafzai Pashtun tribe

The Khizarzai (Pashto: خضرزی) (commonly known as Khadarzai) is a Pashtun subtribe of the Mandanr branch of the Yousafzai. The tribe is named after Khizar Khan, one of the four sons of Mandanr (Mahmood Khan, Khizar Khan, Razar and Manu). Khizar Khan is buried in the Shewa area of Swabi District in Khyber-Pakhtunkhwa. The Khizarzai (Khadarzai) are based in Swabi, SWAT, and Nowshehra Districts of Khyber Pakhtunkhwa.
