= Khan Khel =

Yusufzai/KhanKhel خان خیل (Pashto)
Regions with significant populations
- Primarily Pakistan and Afghanistan

Languages
- Pashto (Native)

Khan Khel (Pashto: خان خیل) is a sub-tribe of the Yusufzai Pashtun tribe. There are many other subsections in different tribes having the same name.

== Notable people ==
- Faisal Javed Khan, Pakistani politician and a Member of the Senate of Pakistan
