= Beka, Khyber Pakhtunkhwa =

Beka
- town and Union Council
- Location within Pakistan
- Coordinates: 33°59′37″N 72°20′51″E
- Country: Pakistan
- Province: Khyber Pakhtunkhwa
- District: Swabi District
- Tehsil: Lahor Tehsil
- Beka Sharif: 1758
- Founder: Nawab Nehmat Khan
- Elevation: 272 m (892 ft)
- 35000

Beka is a town and Union Council of Swabi District in the Khyber Pakhtunkhwa of Pakistan. It is part of Lahor Tehsil.
