= Khalabat Township =

Tarbela Township Tarbela Lake
- Town and union council
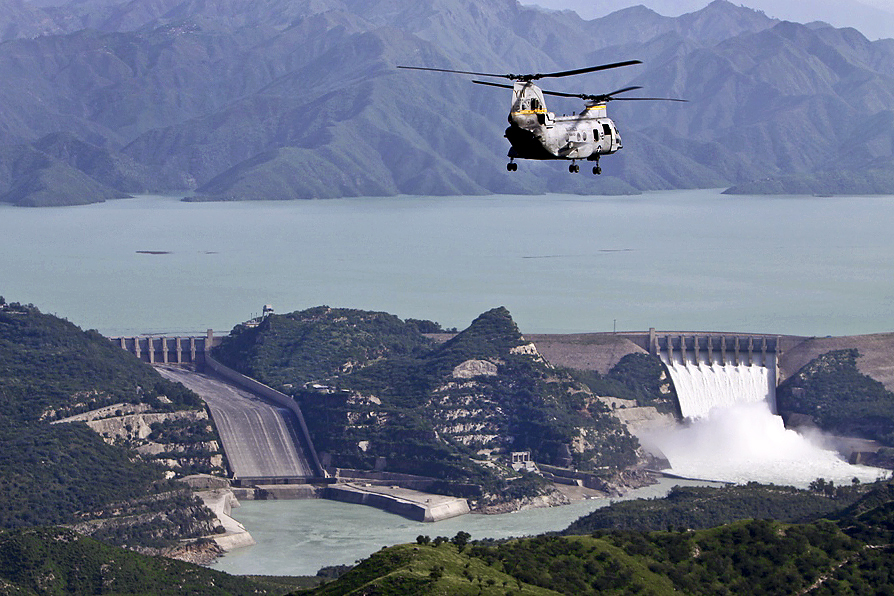
- Tarbela Lake Behind Tarbela Township.
- Interactive map of Tarbela Township
- Coordinates: 34°13′N 73°02′E
- Country: Pakistan
- Region: Khyber Pakhtunkhwa
- District: Haripur District

Population (2023)
  - Total: 55,850
- Time zone: UTC+5 (PST)
- Postal code: 22800
- Website: Khalabat Township

Tarbela Township (also known as Khalabat Township, Khalabat, or Tarbela Colony ) is one of the 30 union councils of Haripur District in the Khyber Pukhtoonkhwa of Pakistan. The administrative division is some 65 km (40 mi) north of Islamabad and 35 km (22 mi) south of Abbottabad. Covering a hilly plain area, the township comprises four sectors and two Union Councils: Tarbela Union Council has sector 1 and 2, and Khalabat Union Council has sector 3 and 4.

== Location ==
The elevation is 1,440 feet (439 m). It is located on the way from Haripur to Tarbela Lake (see external image).

The GPO Located at:

General Post Office. Sector 01, Khalabat Township, Postcode:22800, Haripur, Khyber Pakhtunkhwa.

Civil Hospital Located at:

Utman Chowk, Sector#04

== Demographics ==
=== Population ===
Historical population
Year	Pop.	±% p.a.
1951	...	—
1961	...	—
1972	...	—
1981	23,892	—
1998	34,426	+2.17%
2017	47,285	+1.68%
2023	55,850	+2.81%

As of the 2023 census, Khalabat Township had a population of 55,850.
