= Yusufzai =

Pashtun tribe

Yusufzai ايسپزی
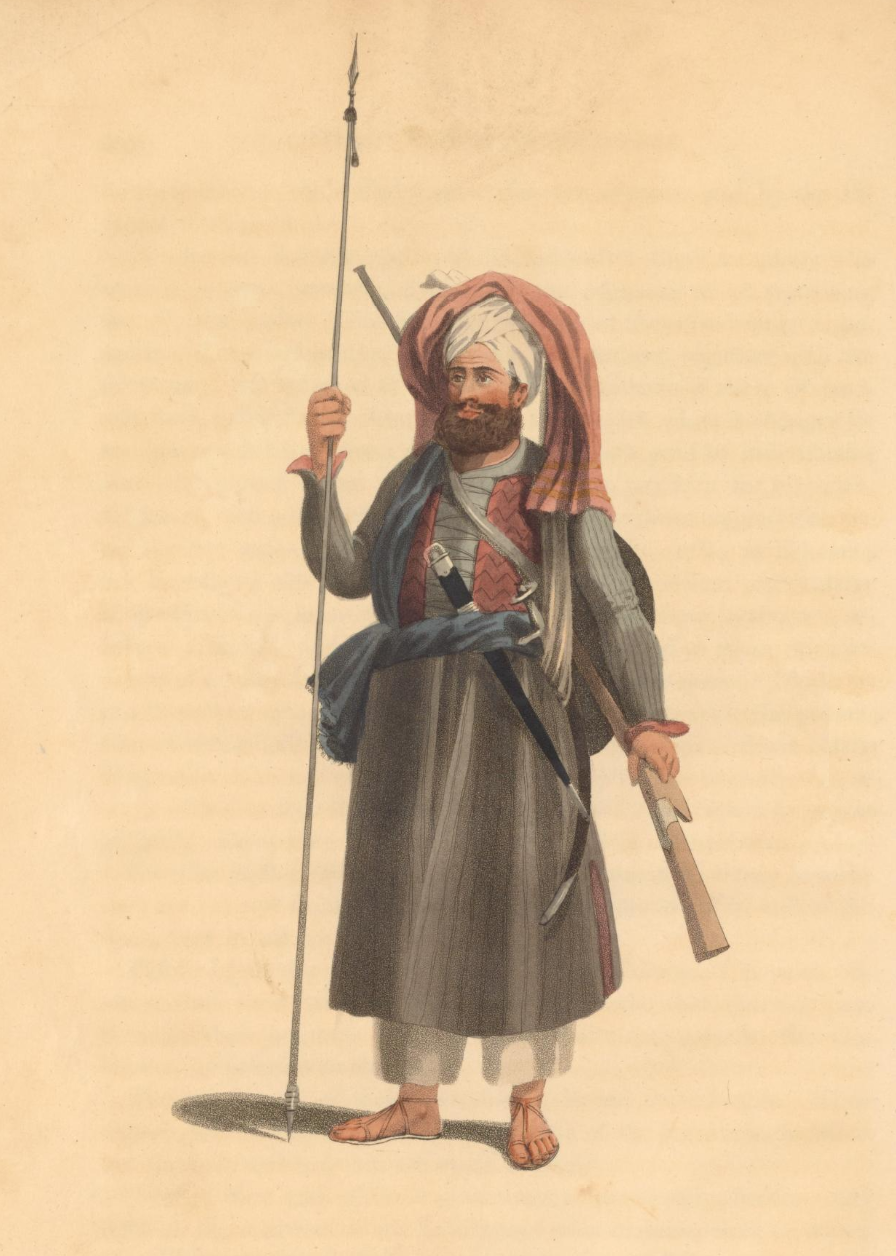
- Depiction of a Yusufzai warrior
- Ethnicity: Pashtun
- Location: Afghanistan, Iran, Pakistan (Khyber Pakhtunkhwa)
- Parent tribe: Sarbani
- Branches: Mandanr, Iliaszai, Akozai, Mandan, Isazai, Malizai
- Language: Pashto
- Religion: Islam

Yusufzai (Note: also known as Yousafzai, most commonly as Esapzai, and historically known as Yusafzai Afghans: Pashto: يوسفزی, romanized: Yusufzai [ju.suf.zäɪ, ʔe.säp.zäɪ]) is one of the largest and historically most important tribes of the Pashtuns. Today, the tribe is mainly based in the northern and central regions of the Pakistani province of Khyber Pakhtunkhwa, specifically the Swat, Panjkora, Buner, Shangla and Peshawar valleys, but members of the tribe also inhabit eastern Afghanistan, having migrated from Kabulistan in the 16th century to the valleys of Swat and Panjkora. They speak a northern dialect of Pashto, traditionally considered the most refined among Pashto dialects, while some are speakers of the southern dialect, such as the Mughal Khel branch, as well as of Urdu and Dari.

== Etymology ==
The name Yusufzai is composed of Yusuf and Pashtun tribal suffix -zai, literally "the descendants of Yusuf". According to the 1595 Mughal text, Ain-i-Akbari, the tribe had a tradition of Israelite descent like other Pashtuns.

== History ==
=== Peace treaty with Babur ===
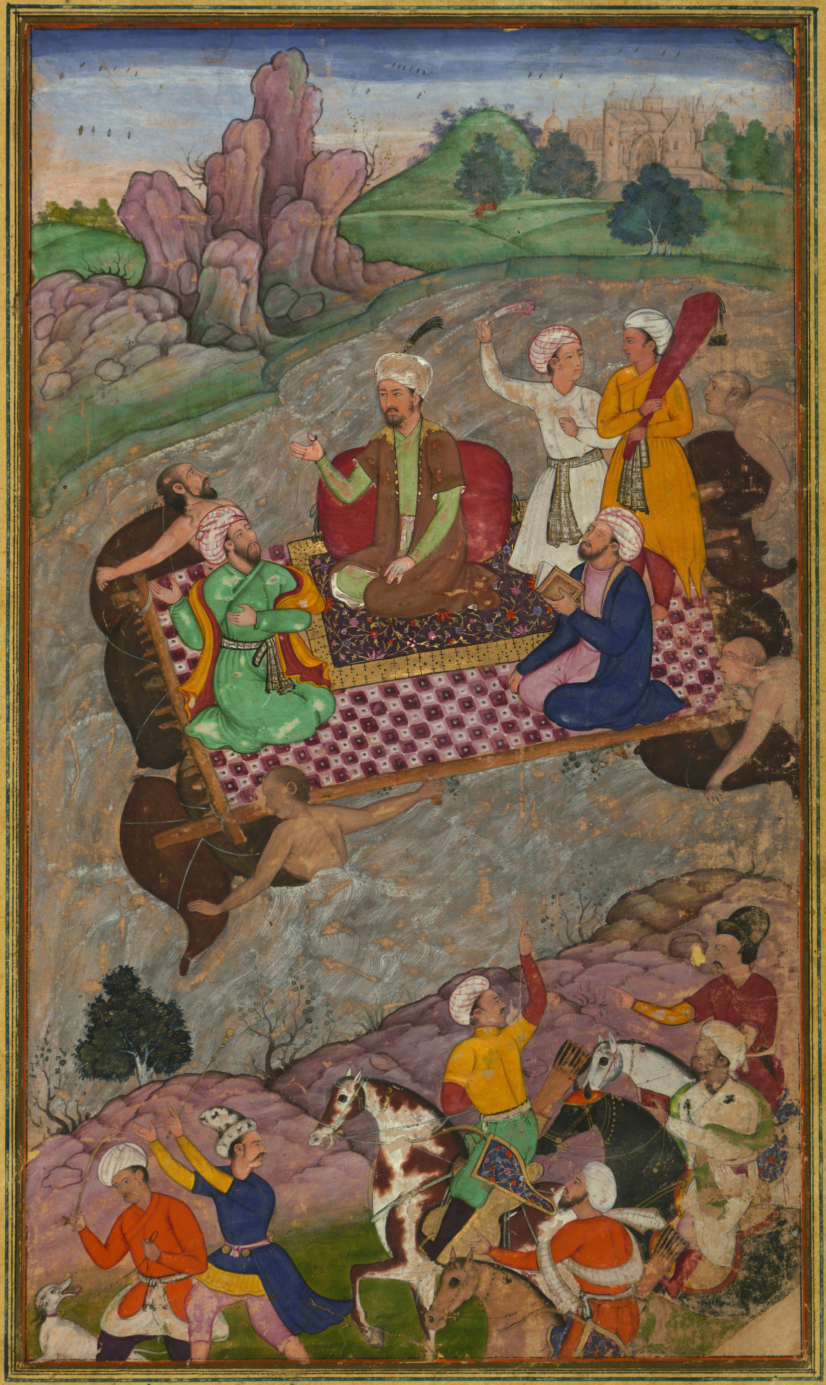
Babur crossing the Kunar River on a raft, west of Bajaur

During the early modern period, the Yusufzai tribe of Afghans was first explicitly mentioned in Baburnama by Babur, a Timurid ruler from Fergana (in present-day Uzbekistan) who captured Kabul in 1504. On 21 January 1519, two weeks after ordering Bajaur massacre, Babur wrote: "On Friday we marched for Sawad (Swat), with the intention of attacking the Yusufzai Afghans, and dismounted in between the water of Panjkora and the united waters of Chandāwal (Jandul) and Bajaur. Shah Mansur Yusufzai had brought a few well-flavoured and quite intoxicating confections."

Due to the military and strategic strength of the Yousafzai, Babur needed security from their location in the hills that threatened his empire and did not allow for a safe expansion to India. As part of a treaty with Yusufzai Afghans to have family ties, Babur married Bibi Mubarika, daughter of Yusufzai chief Shah Mansur on 30 January 1519 for mutual security after failing to subdue the tribe. Shah Mansur had favoured peace while the faction of Malik Ahmad Khan was against any forging of close ties. Bibi Mubarika played an important role in the establishment of friendly relations of Yusufzai Pashtun chiefs with Babur, who later founded the Mughal Empire after defeating Pashtun Sultan Ibrahim Lodi at the First Battle of Panipat in 1526. One of Mubarika's brothers, Mir Jamal Yusufzai, accompanied Babur to India in 1525 and later held high posts under Mughal Emperors Humayun and Akbar. Although suspicions existed on both sides and the Yusufzai had never paid taxes or tributes to Babur or any other Mughal emperor.

=== Yusufzai Chieftaincy ===
Malak Ahmad Khan Yusufzai conquered the valleys of Swat and Panjkora and Yusufzai remained the powerful and prominent tribe in the region. Main Yusufzai chiefs are as following:

- Malak Ahmad Khan Yusufzai (Reign; 1520 - 1535).
- Malak Gaju Khan Yusufzai (Reign; 1535 - 1553)
- Malak Misri Khan Ali Asghar Yusufzai (Reign; 1553 - 1580)
- Malak Ghazi Khan Yusufzai (Reign; 1580 - 1585)
- Malak Kalu Khan Yousafzai (Reign; 1585 - 1626).
- Malak Bhaku Khan Yusufzai (Reign; 1626 - 1675).

After 1675, the Yusufzai Chieftaincy was divided into 32 areas which was remained under each Yusufzai tribal Mashar (Leader).

In 1586, Akbar the Great invaded Swat but his campaign failed at the Battle of Malandari Pass and it become the greatest disaster to Mughal empire in the era of Akbar.

=== Skirmishes with Mughal forces ===
During the 1580s, many Yusufzais and Mandanrs rebelled against the Mughals and joined the Roshani movement of Pir Roshan. In late 1585, Mughal emperor Akbar sent military forces under Zain Khan Koka and Birbal to crush the rebellion. In February 1586, about 8,000 Mughal soldiers, including Birbal, were killed near the Karakar Pass between Swat and Buner by the Yusufzai lashkar led by Kalu Khan. This was the greatest disaster faced by the Mughal Army during Akbar's reign.

In 1630, under the leadership of Pir Roshan's great-grandson, Abdul Qadir, thousands of Pashtuns from the Yusufzai, Mandanrs, Kheshgi, Mohmand, Afridi, Bangash, and other tribes launched an attack on the Mughal Army in Peshawar. In 1667, the Yusufzai again revolted against the Mughals, with one of their chiefs in Swat proclaiming himself the king. Muhammad Amin Khan brought a 9,000 strong Mughal Army from Delhi to suppress the revolt. Although the Mughal Emperor Aurangzeb was able to conquer the southern Yusufzai plains within the northern Kabul Valley, he failed to wrest Swat and the adjoining valleys from the control of the Yusufzai.

=== Durrani period ===
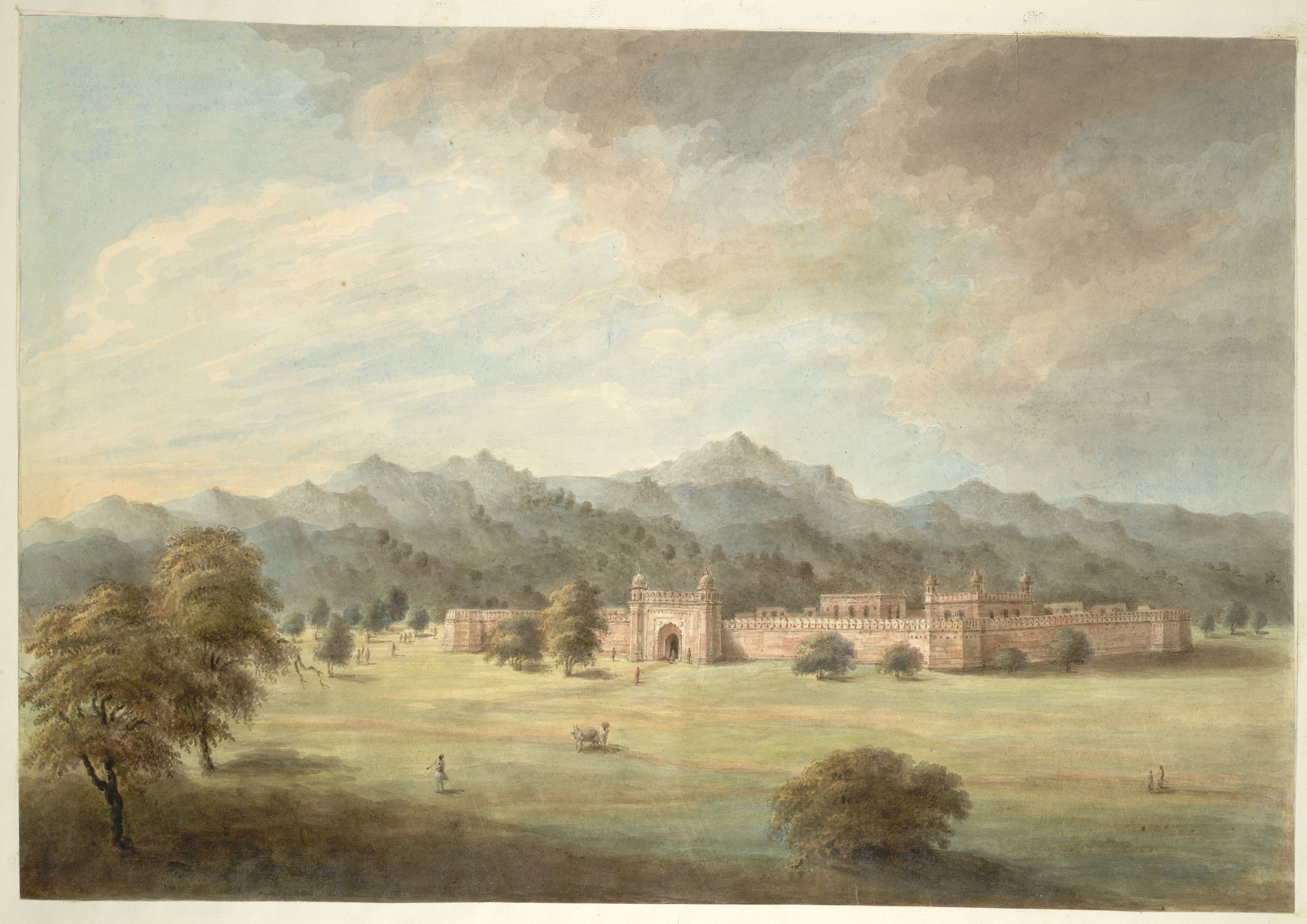
Patthargarh fort outside Najibabad, which was founded by Najib ad-Dawlah Yusufzai in Rohilkhand, India

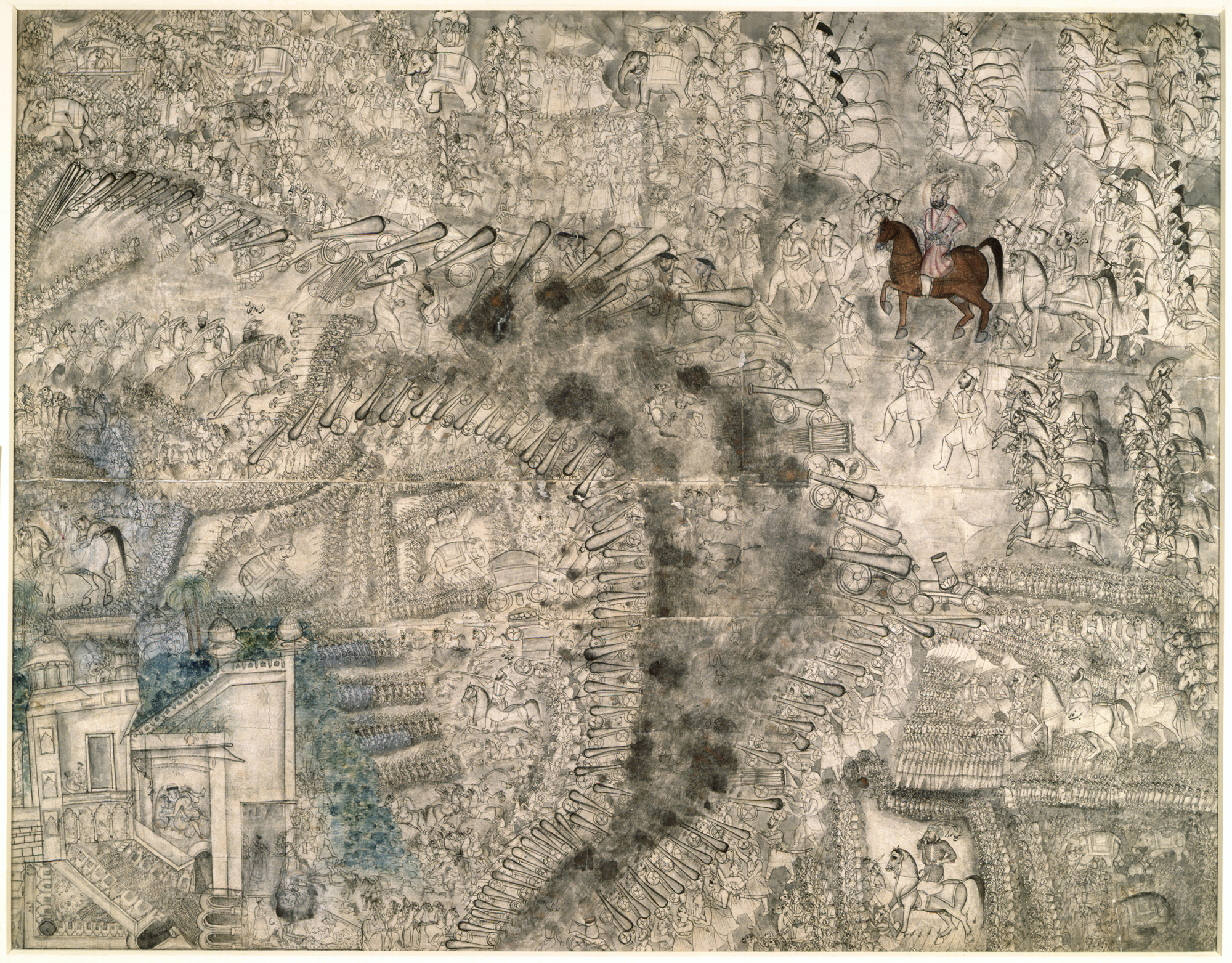
Najib-ud-Daula and Shuja-ud-Daula, marching on the left of Ahmad Shah Durrani, who is riding a brown horse, during the Third Battle of Panipat, which was the largest number of fatalities in a single day reported in a classic formation battle between two armies

Ahmad Shah Durrani (1747–1772), the founder of the Afghan Durrani Empire, categorized all Afghan tribes into four ulūs (tribal confederacies) for administrative purposes: Durrani, Ghilji, Sur, and Bar Durrani ("Upper Durranis"). The Yusufzai were included in the Bar Durrani confederacy along with other eastern Pashtun tribes, including the Mohmand, Afridi, Bangash, and Khattak. The Bar Durrani comprised the bulk of those Pashtuns who settled in Rohilkhand, India where they were known as the Rohilla.

Najib-ud-Daula, who belonged to the Yusufzai tribe, was a prominent Afghan Rohilla chief. In the 1740s, he founded the city of Najibabad in Rohilkhand. In 1757, he supported Ahmad Shah Durrani in his attack on Delhi. After his victory, Ahmad Shah Durrani re-installed the Mughal emperor Alamgir II on the Delhi throne as the titular Mughal head, but gave the actual control of Delhi to Najib ad-Daula. From 1757 to 1770, Najib ad-Daula served as the governor of Saharanpur, also ruling over Dehradun. In 1761, he took part in the Third Battle of Panipat and provided thousands of Rohilla troops and many guns to Ahmad Shah Durrani to defeat the Marathas. He also convinced Shuja-ud-Daula, the Nawab of Awadh, to join the Durrani forces. Before his departure from Delhi, Ahmad Shah Durrani appointed Najib-ud-Daula as Mir Bakshi (paymaster-general) of the Mughal emperor Shah Alam II. After his death in 1770, Najib ad-Dawlah was succeeded by his son, Zabita Khan, who was defeated in 1772 by a joint Mughal-Maratha force, forcing him to flee from Rohilkhand. However, the descendants of Najib ad-Dawlah continued to rule Najibabad area until they were defeated by the British at Nagina on 21 April 1858 during the Indian Rebellion of 1857.

Today, many Yusufzais are settled in India, most notably in Rohilkhand region, as well as in Farrukhabad, which was founded in 1714 by Pashtun Nawab Muhammad Khan Bangash.

=== State of Dir ===
Flag of the state of Dir

In Dir, descendants of 17th-century Akhund Ilyas Yusufzai, the founder of the city of Dir, laid the foundation of the state of Dir. In 1897, the British Raj annexed Dir and granted the title of the "Nawab of Dir" to Sharif Khan Akhundkhel, the ruler of Dir (1886–1904).

The princely state of Dir existed until 1969, after which they were merged into West Pakistan, and then in 1970 into the North-West Frontier Province (present-day Khyber Pakhtunkhwa) of Pakistan.

== Distribution ==
Most Yusufzais are settled in the northern part of Khyber Pakhtunkhwa (Malakand, Dir, Swat, Shangla, Buner, Swabi, Mardan, Bajaur, Peshawar, and Tor Ghar), to which they migrated from Kabul during the 16th century, but they are also present in parts of Afghanistan, including Kunar, Kabul, Kandahar and Farah. Outside of these countries, they can be found in Ghoriwala, Bannu (Mughal Khel), Sibi (Akazai), Chagai (Hassanzai) and Rohilkhand.

== Pashto dialect ==
Yusufzai Pashto, which is a variety of Northern Pashto, is the prestige variety of Pashto in the Khyber Pakhtunkhwa province of Pakistan. Some of its consonants differ from the other dialects:

Dialects	ښ	ږ	څ	ځ	ژ
Yusufzai Pashto	[x]	[ɡ]	[s, t͡s]	[z]	[d͡ʒ]
Ghilji Pashto	[ç]	[ʝ]	[t͡s]	[z]	[ʒ, z]
Durrani Pashto	[ʂ]	[ʐ]	[t͡s]	[d͡z]	[ʒ]

== Society ==
The Yusufzai Pashtun aristocracy was historically divided into several communities based on patrilineal segmentary groups:

Khān

The khān referred to the Yusufzai landowners. In the 16th century, saint Sheikh Milli, a prominent Yusufzai dignitary, distributed the Yusufzai land among the major Yusufzai tribal clans (khēl). However, to avoid inequalities, he ordered that the lands should not become permanent property of the clans, but rather they should be realloted within the patrilineal clans periodically after every ten years or so. In this system (wēsh), each landowning khān would own shares (brakha) representing his proportion of the total area distributed. Through a regular rotation of ownership, the Yusufzai landowners would migrate for up to 30 miles for their new share after each cycle, although the tenants cultivating the land would stay on.

The wēsh system operated among the Yusufzai of Swat region until at least 1920s.

Hamsāya

The hamsāya or "shade sharers" were the clients or dependents from other (non-Yusufzai) Pashtun tribes who became attached to the Yusufzai tribe over the years.

Faqīr

The faqīr or "poor" were the non-Pashtun landless peasants who were assigned to the Yusufzai landowners. As dependent peasants, the faqīr used to pay rent for the land they cultivated.

In the 19th century, the distinction between hamsāya as a "dependent Pashtun tribe" and faqīr as "non-Pashtun landless peasants" became blurred. Both terms were then interchangeably used to simply refer to landless dependents or clients.

Mlātəṛ

The mlātəṛ or "supporters" provided services to their patrons as artisans (kasabgar), musicians (ḍəm), herders, or commercial agents, mostly in return for a payment in grain or rice.

Ghulām

The ghulām or "slaves" were more closely attached to their patron and his family and frequently entrusted with a variety of functions within their master's household. Although the ghulām were less free as compared to the hamsāya or the faqīr, they generally enjoyed a higher status in the society.

== Subtribes ==
- Akazai
- Babuzai
- Shamozai
- Balarkhel
- Chagharzai
- Degankhel
- Hassanzai
- Kamalzai
- Khan Khel
- Khwaja Khel (Khwajgan)
- Madakhel
- Malizai
- Mandanr
  - Abakhel
  - Khadarzai
  - Utmanzai
- Mughal Khel
- Niamatkhel
- Nikpikhel
- Ranizai
- Tahirkheli

== Notable people ==
- Gaju Khan, Pashtun chief who served under Sher Shah Suri
- Shaukat Ali Yousafzai, journalist and PTI leader
- Gohar Ali Khan, lawyer and vhairman of Pakistan Tehreek-e-Insaf (PTI)
- Mashal Yousafzai, chief advisor to the Chief Minister of Khyber Pakhtunkhwa and lawyer for PTI
- Bibi Mubarika, Empress Consort of the Mughal Empire
- Malak Ahmad Khan Yusufzai, Pashtun chief
- Bahaku Khan Yousafzai, Afghan Warrior who fought in the Sixth Mughal–Afghan Wars of 1667–1678 (Note: The War beginning with the Yusufzai attack of 1667, led by Bhaku/Bhagu Khan)
- Kalu Khan Yusufzai, Pashtun chieftain leader who rallied his tribe and rebelled against Mughal emperor Akbar the Great and inflicted one of their greatest defeats in 1586
- Hafiz Alpuri, Pashto poet of the 18th Century
- Haji Musa Khan, Pashtun tribal leader martyr who refused to give up ground to the Taliban
- Malala Yousafzai (born 1997), Pashtun female education activist and Nobel Peace Prize laureate, from the Dalokhel Subclan
- Ziauddin Yousafzai (born 1969), Pashtun education activist and father of Malala Yousafzai, from the Dalokhel Subclan
- Khan Roshan Khan, Pashtun historian
- Najib ad-Dawlah Yousafzai, Afghan serviceman who fought with Ahmad Shāh's Durrani Empire to Victory at Panipat, 1761
- Karnal Sher Khan, military officer who was martyred in the Kargil War and decorated with the awarded Nishan-e-Haider for highest Wartime Gallantry of Pakistan
- Rahimullah Yusufzai, journalist who once interviewed Osama Bin Laden
- Sami Yousafzai, Afghan journalist
- Nisar Muhammad Yousafzai, socialist revolutionary, decorated War Hero of the Afghan War of Independence as well as a founding father for the nation of Tajikistan
- Abdul Ghafoor Yusufzai, Afghan footballer representing the Kingdom of Afghanistan in the 1948 Summer Olympic Games
- Mohammad Sarwar Yousafzai, Afghan footballer who competed in the 1948 Summer Olympics
- Hamidullah Yousafzai, Afghan football player who played for Afghanistan national football team
- Abaseen Yousafzai, poet and famous writer
- Sartor Faqir, a Pashtun tribal Yusufzai leader and a freedom fighter. The faqīr declared a Jihād against the British Empire, unsuccessfully in 1895, then successfully in 1897
- Nisar Muhammad Khan, specialised in Pashto language and culture
- Azimullah Khan Yusufzai, Afghan warrior hero of the Great Revolt of 1857 against the British East India Company
- Malik Jamroz Khan, Pashtun tribal leader and among the founders of the Princely State of Swat
- Afzal Khan Lala, Pashtun nationalist, NAP affiliate and former provincial and federal minister of NWFP
- Kabir Stori, Pashtun nationalist, poet and writer who founded the Pashtuns Social Democratic Party, refused offers to join government from President Najibullah and was imprisoned by the military regime of Zia-ul-Haq
- Asmatullah Rohani, Afghan judge, educator and a human rights activist during the PDPA regime
- Ghulam Nabi Khan, Afghan ambassador killed without trial and avenged with the assassination of King Nadir Shah
- Jafar Khan Yusufzai, former Raes of Mughal Khel Tappa, Bannu
- Madhubala, Indian Bollywood actress and superstar

== Notes ==
- ^1In Pashto, "Yusufzai" (یوسفزی, [jusəpˈzai]) is the masculine singular form of the word. Its feminine singular is "Yusufzey" (یوسفزۍ, [jusəpˈzəi]), while its plural is "Yusufzee" (یوسفزي, [jusəpˈzi]).
