= List of populated places in Swabi District =

This is an alphabetical list of populated places in Swabi District, Khyber Pakhtunkhwa, Pakistan. It includes villages, towns, and union councils.

== Towns and union councils ==
- Adina
- Anbar
- Bachai
- Batakara
- Beka
- Chak Noda
- Dagai
- Dobian
- Gandaf
- Gani Chatra
- Gasbasni
- Ismaila
- Jalsai
- Jhanda
- Kabgani
- Kalabat
- Kalu Khan
- Karnal Sher Kallay
- Kotha
- Lahor
- Lahor Gharbi
- Lahor Sharqi
- Maniri Payan
- Manki
- Marghuz
- Mathani Changan
- Naranji
- Pabeni
- Panjpir
- Parmoli
- Saleem Khan
- Sard Cheena
- Shah Mansur
- Shamansoor
- Sheikh Jana
- Shewa Adda
- Shiekh Jana
- Sudhir
- Swabi (district headquarters)
- Swabi Maniri
- Tarakai
- Thand Kohi
- Thordher
- Topi East
- Topi West
- Topi
- Tordher
- Yar Hussain
- Yar Hussain (Union Council East)
- Yar Hussain (Union Council West)
- Zarobi

== Tehsils, villages and other settlements ==
- Ambar
- Asota
- Babo Dehri
- Bam Khel
- Charbagh
- Gar Munara
- Hund
- Jabar
- Jalbai
- Jehangira
- Kaddi
- Khoro Swabi
- Khunda
- Lahor Tehsil
- Maini
- Mehr Ali
- Pabaini
- Razar Tehsil
- Shewa
- Swabi Tehsil
- Thandkoi
- Topi Tehsil
- Turlandi
- Yaqubi
- Zaida
