= Babo Dehri =

Village in Khyber Pakhtunkhwa, Pakistan

Babo Dehri بابو ڈھیری
- Village
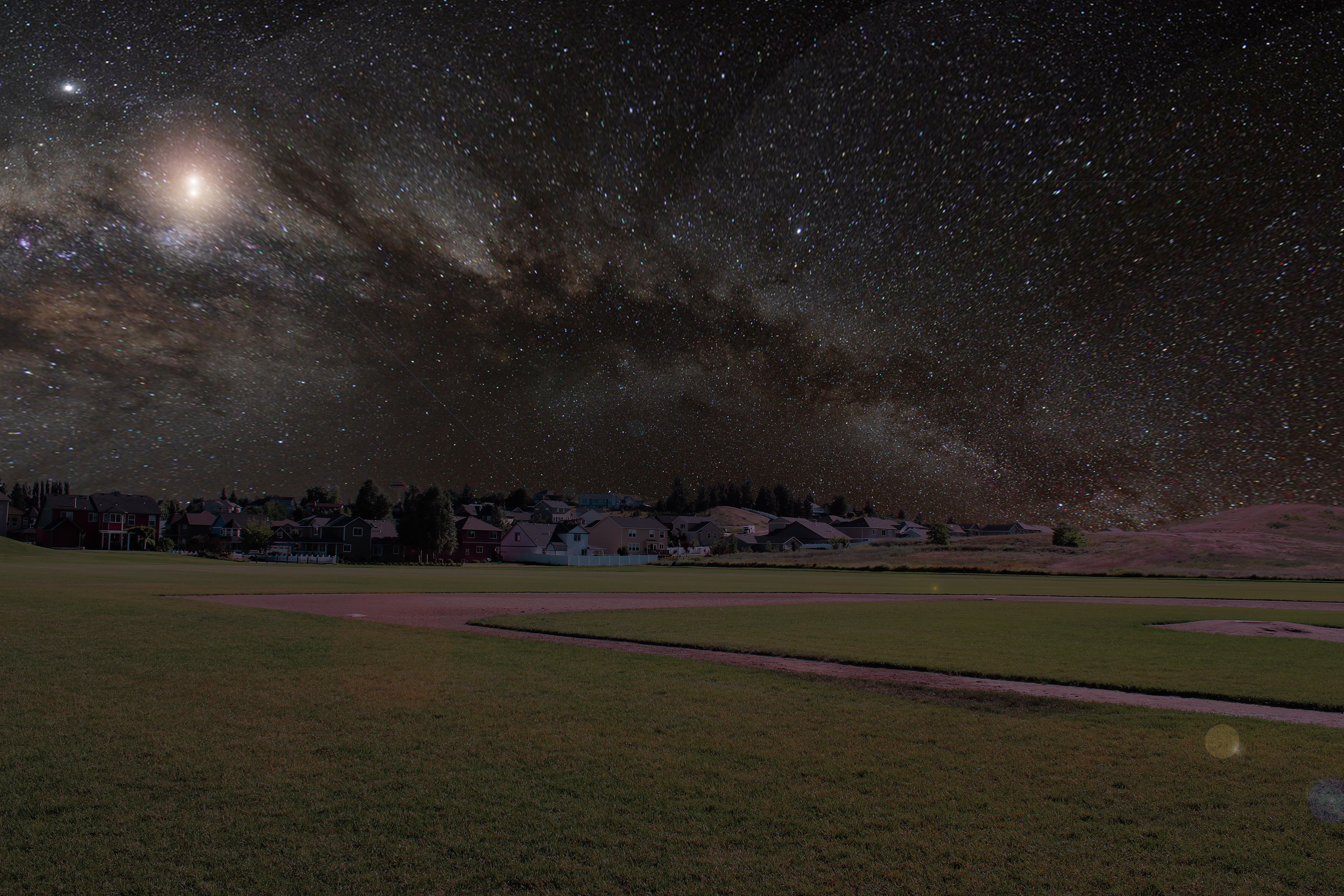

- Location of Babo Dehri Babo Dehri (Pakistan)
- Coordinates: 34.170752°N 72.2257942°E
- Country: Pakistan
- Province: Khyber Pakhtunkhwa
- District: Swabi
- Tehsil: Razzar
- Time zone: UTC+5 (PST)
- Postal code: 23330
- Area code: +92 938

Babo Dehri (Urdu: بابو ڈھیری) is a village located in the Swabi District of Khyber Pakhtunkhwa, Pakistan. It is situated near Dobian, a union council, and lies about 27 km from Mardan and 84 km from the provincial capital, Peshawar

== Education ==
- Govt Primary School
- Govt Girls Primary School
- The Pearl School
- The Bright Beginnings School
- The Vision Academy

== Neighborhoods ==
- Dobian
- Yar Hussain
- Sard Cheena

== See also ==
List of populated places in Swabi District
