= Sard Cheena =

- Union Council
- Country: Pakistan
- Province: Khyber Pakhtunkhwa
- District: Swabi
- Time zone: UTC+5 (PST)

Sard Cheena is an administrative unit, known as Union council of Swabi District in the Khyber Pakhtunkhwa province of Pakistan. Its neighborhood localities are Dobian, Yaqubi and Yar Hussain

District Swabi has 4 Tehsils i.e. Swabi Tehsil, Lahor, Topi Tehsil and Razar. Each Tehsil comprises certain numbers of union councils. There are 56 union councils in district Swabi.

== See also ==
- Swabi District
