= Jalsai =

Coordinates: 34°03′N 72°20′E

- Union Council
- Interactive map of Jalsai
- Country: Pakistan
- Province: Khyber Pakhtunkhwa
- District: Swabi
- Time zone: UTC+5 (PST)

Jalsai is an administrative unit, known as Union council of Swabi District in the Khyber Pakhtunkhwa province of Pakistan.Its boundary touches other union councils as Lahor, Manki and Jalbai. Jalsai is connected to GT road through swabi jehangira road

District Swabi has 4 Tehsils i.e. Swabi Tehsil, Lahor, Topi Tehsil and Razar. Each Tehsil comprises certain numbers of union councils. There are 56 union councils in district Swabi.

== See also ==
- Swabi District
