= Manki, Swabi =

Coordinates: 34°1′0″N 72°20′0″E

Manki
- Union Council
- Interactive map of Manki
- Country: Pakistan
- Province: Khyber Pakhtunkhwa
- District: Swabi
- Time zone: UTC+5 (PST)

Manki is a village near by Tordher. It is 20 km from Swabi and 13 km from Jehangira.

Manki is an administrative unit, known as Union council of Swabi District in the Khyber Pakhtunkhwa province of Pakistan.

District Swabi has 4 tehsils: Swabi Tehsil, Lahor, Topi Tehsil and Razar. Each comprises a certain number of union councils. There are 56 union councils in Swabi.

== See also ==
- Swabi District
