= Topi West =

- Union Council
- Country: Pakistan
- Province: Khyber Pakhtunkhwa
- District: Swabi
- Time zone: UTC+5 (PST)

Topi West is an administrative unit, known as Union council of Swabi District in the Khyber Pakhtunkhwa province of Pakistan.

District Swabi has four Tehsils i.e. Swabi Tehsil, Lahor, Topi Tehsil and Razar. There are 56 union councils in the Swabi district divided between these four Tehsils.

== See also ==
- Swabi District
