= Kabgani =

Coordinates: 34°11′N 72°41′E

- Union Council
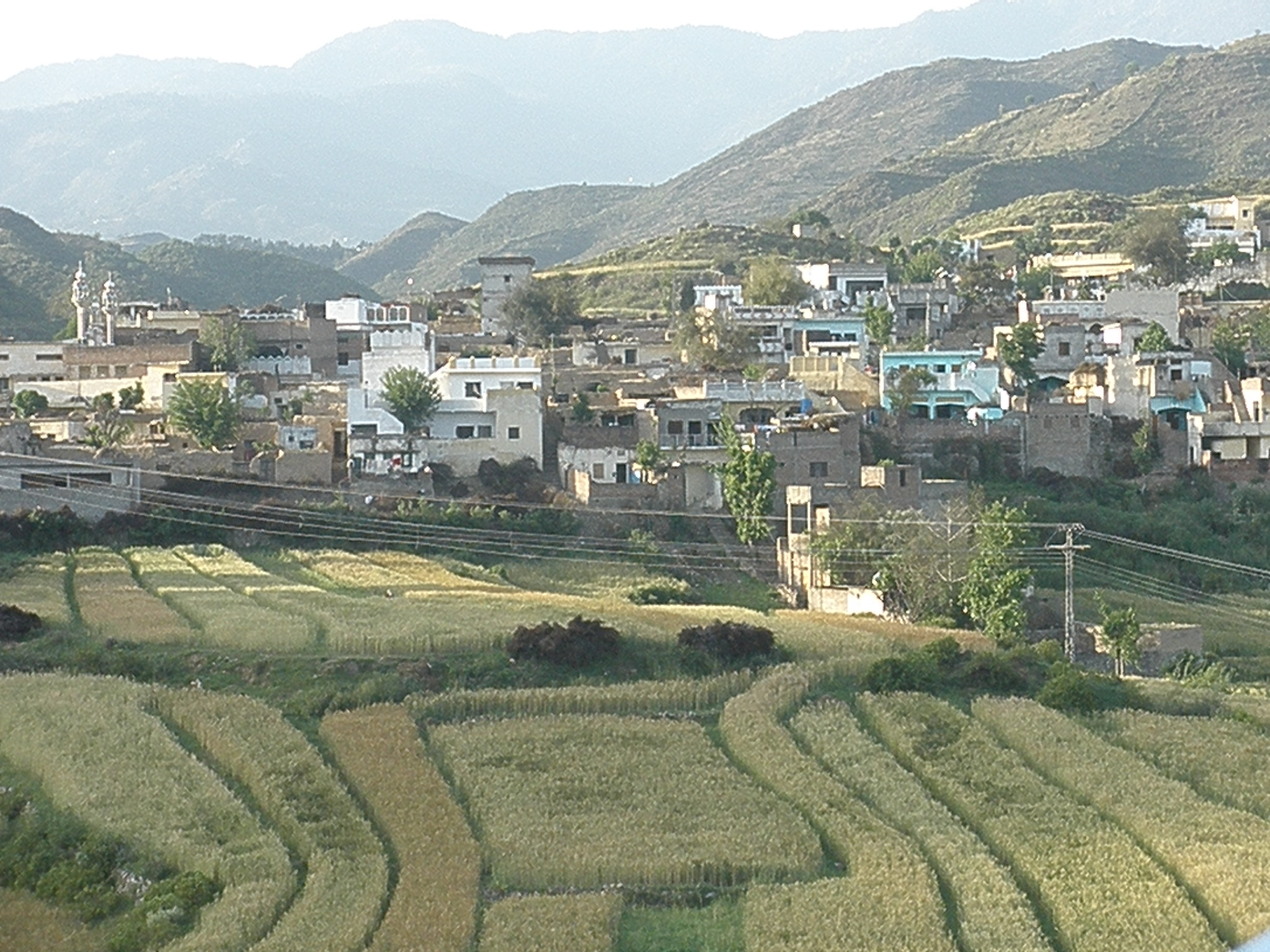
- Kabgani in 2009
- Interactive map of Kabgani
- Country: Pakistan
- Province: Khyber Pakhtunkhwa
- District: Swabi
- Time zone: UTC+5 (PST)

Kabgani is an administrative unit, known as Union council of Swabi District in the Khyber Pakhtunkhwa province of Pakistan. Further more Kabgani is a village located in the Swabi district of Khyber Pakhtunkhwa (KPK), Pakistan. It's a rural area with a rich cultural heritage and history. The village is surrounded by lush green fields, orchards, and mountains, making it a beautiful and peaceful place.

District Swabi has 4 Tehsils i.e. Swabi Tehsil, Lahor, Topi Tehsil and Razar. Each Tehsil comprises certain numbers of union councils. There are 56 union councils in district Swabi. Word Kabgani meaning Kabgani is a term that may have different meanings depending on the context. Here are a few possible interpretations:

1. Kabgani is a Hindi word that means "hidden" or "secret". 2. In Urdu, Kabgani means "mystery" or "enigma". 3. In some African cultures, Kabgani is a name that means "gift" or "blessing".

== Geography and Location ==
Kabgani (Pashto: کابګنی) is a small hillside village and union council located in the Gadoon Amazai area of Swabi District, Khyber Pakhtunkhwa, Pakistan. It is situated approximately 31 kilometres northeast of Swabi city and about 16 kilometres from Topi. The village is built on elevated terrain with terraced houses on sloped hillsides, offering scenic views of the surrounding landscape.

The area falls within the Gadoon rangelands, characterized by a mix of subtropical and temperate climates with elevations ranging from 410 to 2250 metres. The region supports a rich diversity of plant life and wildlife.

== Administration ==
Kabgani serves as one of the union councils of the Gadoon Amazai belt. In 2022, the Khyber Pakhtunkhwa provincial government announced that the Gadoon region would be upgraded to the status of a tehsil within Swabi District, enhancing its administrative significance.

== Facilities and Services ==
Kabgani village has several key facilities, including:

- Government Higher Secondary School Kabgani
- Habib Bank Limited (HBL) Branch
- Pakistan Post Office
- Basic Health Unit (BHU)
- Veterinary Hospital

These services make Kabgani a central point for surrounding smaller villages in the Gadoon Amazai area.

== See also ==
- Swabi District
- Khyber Pakhtunkhwa
