= Anbar, Swabi =

Coordinates: 33°26′N 73°51′E

Anbar
- Union Council
- Interactive map of Anbar
- Country: Pakistan
- Province: Khyber Pakhtunkhwa
- District: Swabi
- Time zone: UTC+5 (PST)
- Number of towns: ADD HERE
- Number of Union Councils: ADD HERE

Anbar is an administrative unit, known as Union council of Swabi District in the Khyber Pakhtunkhwa province of Pakistan.

District Swabi has 4 Tehsils i.e. Swabi Tehsil, Lahor, Topi Tehsil and Razar. Each Tehsil comprises certain numbers of union councils. There are 56 union councils in district Swabi. Anbar is situated between the union council Zaida & Tehsil Lahore. University of swabi is also located in Anbar.

== See also ==
- Swabi District
- Hund
