= Gasbasni =

Gabasni
- Union Council
- Country: Pakistan
- Province: Khyber Pakhtunkhwa
- District: Swabi
- Time zone: UTC+5 (PST)

Gabasni is an administrative unit, known as Union council of Swabi District in the Khyber Pakhtunkhwa province of Pakistan. It is a major UC in its Tehsil (Topi) and includes many villages of the Gadoon Area. The majority of the people living in the area belong from the tribe of Jadoon while other tribes also are present like Yousafzai, Khattak, Razar & Tanoli

The Union Council is named after the village of Gabasni, which has become a bustling village in the region despite its rather remote location. It has mostly risen to prominence due to the Amazai Road built in the late 90s, allowing vehicular traffic to gain access to the village directly.

District Swabi has 4 Tehsils i.e. Swabi Tehsil, Lahor, Topi Tehsil and Razar. Each Tehsil comprises certain numbers of union councils. There are 56 union councils in district Swabi.

== See also ==
- Swabi District
