= Mehr Ali =

Mehr Ali مہر علی
- Mehr Ali shown within Pakistan
- Coordinates: 34°17′42″N 72°21′44″E
- Country: Pakistan
- Province: Khyber Pakhtunkhwa
- District: Swabi
- Tehsil: Razar
- Time zone: UTC+5 (PST)

Mehr Ali (مہر علی) is a village located in Razar Tehsil, Swabi District in the Pakistani province of Khyber Pakhtunkhwa. The road from Shewa Adda leading to Sher Darra passes through Mehr Ali. This road is connected to per baba road passes from Sher Darra village about three kilometres at the north of Mehr Ali from where the Buner District starts . It is surrounded by Barsati Nalahs from the east and west. There are two roads; one of them leads from Rustam via Machi Mardan District, and another from Mehr Ali links to another road that leads to Swat valley. It lies at the foot of the Himalayan range of mountains.

== Tribe ==
The main tribe living here are the Yousafzai Nawarkhel, a well known family of Swabi District. They are the owners of the land of this village. Some other families also live here who are peasants.

== Population ==
The village consists of about 300 homes.

== Education ==
Most of the people who live here rely on subsistence farming. Those with some degree of education serve in various departments, i.e., army, police, rangers, education,judiciary, and agriculture. There are two primary schools and one middle school for boys and one primary for girls : one is BHU and the other is run by a non-governmental organization.
