= Yar Hussain =

Yar Hussain یار حسین
- Town
- Location within Khyber Pakhtunkhwa Location within Pakistan
- Coordinates: 34°10′15″N 72°16′15″E
- Country: Pakistan
- Province: Khyber Pakhtunkhwa
- District: Swabi
- Tehsil: Razzar
- Time zone: UTC+05:00 (PKT)
- Postal code: 23320
- Area code: +92 938

Yar Hussain (Pashto: یار حسین; Urdu: یار حسین) is one of the largest towns in the Khyber Pakhtunkhwa province of Pakistan, lying about 23 kilometres (14 mi) from the district capital of Mardan and 82 kilometres (51 mi) from the provincial capital of Peshawar.

Yar Hussain is the business centre of the surrounding locality, which includes the towns of Yaqubi, Sard Cheena, Terwatu, Sudher Yaqubi Shaheeda and Dobian.

== Known For ==
It is also a major tobacco business centre. The tobacco produced is of a good quality. However, the rate of return for the farmers is much lower, as compared to the profit margin for middlemen, companies and cigarette manufacturers.

== Neighborhoods ==
- Yaqubi
- Sard Cheena,
- Terwatu,
- Sudher
- Yaqubi
- Shaheeda
- Dobian.
