= Jabar =

Jabar may refer to:

- Jabar, Iran, a village
- Jabar, Tordher, a village in Pakistan
- Jabar (union council), a union council in Pakistan
- Jabăr, a village in Boldur, Timiș County, Romania
- West Java, known in Indonesian as Jawa Barat and abbreviated to Jabar

== See also ==
- Jabbar (disambiguation)
