= Sudhir, Swabi =

Sudher
- Union Council
- Country: Pakistan
- Province: Khyber Pakhtunkhwa
- District: Swabi
- Time zone: UTC+5 (PST)

Sudhir is an administrative unit, known as Union council of Swabi District in the Khyber Pakhtunkhwa province of Pakistan.

District Swabi has 4 Tehsils i.e. Swabi Tehsil, Lahor, Topi Tehsil and Razar. Each Tehsil comprises certain numbers of union councils. There are 56 union councils in district Swabi.

== See also ==
- Swabi District
