= Swab Phaoprathan =

Thai businessman and politician

Swab Phaoprathan (Thai: สวาป เผ่าประทาน), also known as Sawab Khan Pathan or Tawab Khan, is a Thai businessman and politician of Pashtun Pakistani ancestry. He became a member of the House of Representatives in January 2020 as a party-list candidate for Bhumjaithai Party, following the death of Chai Chidchob.

Khan was born to a Thai family of Pakistani ancestry whose family migrated from Muhibullah Banda village in Adina, Swabi District. (Note: at the time known as 'Swabi Tehsil', then a district of Mardan) He is fluent in Pashto language. His father, Abdul Wahab, was a soldier in British Indian Army.

Previously, he has served as a special representative of the Thai king for the Muslim community in Thailand.
