= Baghwani =

Baghwani is the name of a people residing in the Khyber-Pakhtunkhwa province of Pakistan. The name Baaghwan is derived from the term baghwaan, which means "gardener" in Pushto. The term Baaghwan refers to people who cultivate the land. Some of the Baaghwans cultivate the land of others on certain terms, for example, one-third of the crop.

These are the Baghwani which are residing in Tordher town of Swabi District in Khyber-Pakhtunkhwa. The family of Seth Khawas Khan Baba and seth Mir Afzal Baba was the richest family in the area. The famous social worker and renowned software engineer, Junaid Baghwani belongs to this family. Most of these baghwanan are government servants, teachers, doctors, soldiers, and engineers, etc. These people are famous for their nobility.
