= Taskeen Manerwal =

Pakistani Pashto writer and intellectual (1949–2022)

- تسکین مانیروال
- Born: Mohammad Taskeen; 15 September 1949; Swabi, Pakistan
- Died: 10 January 2022 (aged 72); Swabi, Pakistan
- Resting place: Maniri Payan, Swabi District
- Education: Government Post Graduate College, Swabi
- Occupations: Poet, Writer, Intellectual, Author
- Writing career
- Language: Pashto

Mohammad Taskeen Manerwal (Pashto: محمد تسکین مانیروال; 15 September 1949 – 10 January 2022) was a Pakistani intellectual, writer, and author of Pashto literature and poetry. He was also a teacher and retired from the Department of Education in 1999 as a headmaster. He belonged to Maniri Swabi.

== Early life ==
Mohammad Taskeen was born on 15 September 1949 (Note: A diary kept by Taskeen's father shows 1948.) in Maniri village of Swabi. He had three sisters and three brothers, and his father Mohammad Yameen was a school headmaster. Taskeen was nicknamed "Manerwal" after his village, while the name "Taskeen" was originally given to a deceased elder brother.

Manerwal began primary school in 1953. He matriculated from Swabi High School in 1965, and finished intermediate college at Government Post Graduate College, Swabi in 1967. He later completed a private (Note: Private candidates do not attend classes, but receive their degrees by passing the final examinations for subjects.) B.A. (1977) and B.Ed (1980). He became a schoolteacher in 1969, and retired from the Department of Education in 1999 as a headmaster.

== Career ==
Manerwal started writing poetry when he was a fifth-grade student, influenced by the Pashto poets Rahman Baba and Khushal Khan Khattak. When Taskeen was studying at Government Post Graduate College, Swabi, he was involved in the publication of the Neelab Magazine. His writing in Neelab brought him to the attention of established Pashto writers such as Abdul Ghani Khan. Manerwal's numerous ghazals and poems, such as "Cha Kha Khoshay Shara Wy" (1973), were popular among Pashtuns not only in Pakistan but also in Afghanistan. His only book, the poetry collection Cha Kha Khoshay Shara Wy, was published in 2011, strengthening his reputation as a romantic poet.

== Personal life and death ==
Manerwal was unmarried, but said he would live among the people through his poetry. According to his colleagues, his life was difficult, but when he was among the people, he was a true advocate of peace. He disliked politics, and was a reader of Sufi poetry.

Manerwal died in Swabi on 10 January 2022. He was buried at his ancestral graveyard in Maniri Payan, Swabi. Qaumi Watan Party Provincial Chairman Sikandar Hayat Khan Sherpao, Awami National Party Khyber Pakhtunkhwa President Aimal Wali Khan, General Secretary Sardar Hussain Babak and Culture Secretary Khadim Hussain expressed their condolences.
