= Khoro Swabi =

Khoro
- Village
- Location within Pakistan
- Coordinates: 34°9′9.369″N 72°13′33.655″E
- Country: Pakistan
- Province: Khyber-Pakhtunkhwa
- District: Swabi
- Tehsil: Razr

Population
  - Total: 1,000

The village of Khoro is situated in the north-east of Swabi District, Pakistan, between a small area of Daulat and Dobian. This small area is famous for Dobian because it contains a doab. In the past it was not populated that is why it is called Khoro; in Pashto language Khoro means "soil".

75% of the inhabitants depend upon agriculture. There is only one high school, one primary school and three private schools. Due to these institutions five engineers have been graduated.
