= Abdul Aziz Khan Kaka =

Pashtun politician

- Born: 1906; Zaida Kallay, Swabi Tehsil, Mardan District, North-West Frontier
- Died: 1987 (aged 80–81)

Abdul Aziz Khan Kaka (1906–1987) was a member of the Khudai Khidmatgar Movement from Zaida Kallay, Swabi who defeated the Imperial Crown's Political Agent, Sir Sahibzada Abdul Qayyum Khan in the elections of 1936.

== Anti-Colonial Politics ==
Under the 1935 India Act, the British accorded the North-West Frontier to Provincial status where elections were held. Aziz Khan Kaka, an associate of the movement's leader, Abdul Ghaffar Khan was the first notable example of a Khudai Khidmatgar candidate winning against an established Pro-British figure. Aziz Kaka's victory helped for the Khudai Khidmatgars to then secure 19 out of 50 seats, becoming the only organised body in the frontier that could contest the elections. It was a stepping stone for Pashtun Nationalist Politics in British-Occupied India, as the new Chief Minister of NWFP was Abdul Jabbar Khan, brother of Bacha Khan who would later declare the Bannu Resolution for an Independent Pashtunistan state.

== Pakistan Era ==
Following the inception of Pakistan a crackdown on the group ensued with the Babrra massacre perpetrated by the state forces and the party was declared illegal. Aziz Kaka spent a total 21 years of imprisonment for 'political crimes' and eventually joined the National Awami Party (NAP) where he was elected in 1970 to the provincial legislature as a representative of the NAP.
