= Khunda =

Khunda Kunda
- village
- Kunda
- Location in Pakistan
- Coordinates: 34°3′0″N 72°6′0″E
- Country: Pakistan
- Province: Khyber Pakhtunkhwa
- District: Swabi District
- Tehsil: Lahor Tehsil

Government
  - Type: Democratic
- Time zone: UTC+5 (PST)
  - Summer (DST): +6
- Postal code: 23560
- Area code: 490

Khunda, or Kunda, is a village and Union Council of Swabi District, in Khyber Pakhtunkhwa. It is part of Lahor Tehsil and is located at 34°3'0"N 72°26'0"E.
