= Kalu Khan Yousafzai =

16th-century Afghan military leader

- Ghazi
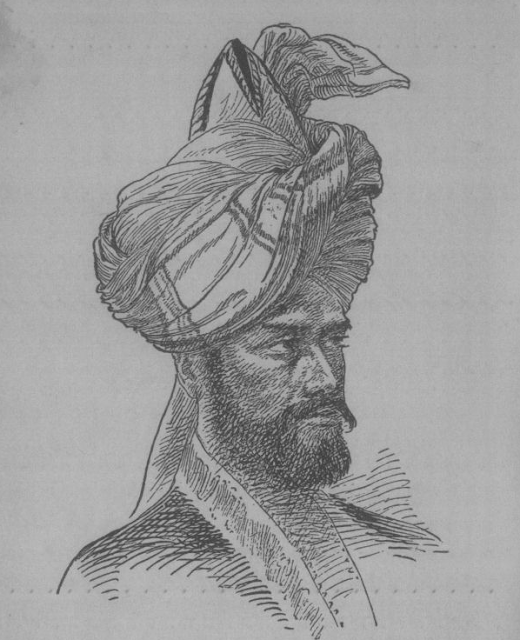
- Reign: 1581–1597
- Predecessor: Malak Gaju Khan Yusufzai
- Successor: Malak Bhaku Khan Yusufzai
- Born: 1550s Turlandi, Swabi
- Died: 1597; Turlandi, Swabi
- House: Yusufzai
- Father: Ali Khan
- Religion: Sunni Islam
- Military career
- Conflicts: Afghan-Mughal War: Battle of the Malandari Pass (1586)

Kalu Khan Yusufzai (Note: also spelt Kalo Khan) (Pashto: کالو خان یوسفزئی) was a Pashtun warrior and military leader in the 16th century who inflicted one of the greatest defeats of the Mughal Empire. He is known for leading the Yusufzai tribe's rebellion against Mughal authority at the Karakar Pass, in modern-day Pakistan, where prominent Mughal commanders including Raja Birbal were killed by Yousafzai tribesman in 1586 during the Mughal-Afghan Wars. His tomb is located in Turlandi, Swabi, in Pakistan's Khyber Pakhtunkhwa province.

== Yousafzai Revolt ==
Following Mullah Meru's defeat and death in 1581 A.D., the Mughals decimated the whole Yousafzai tribe, and Kalu Khan made the decision to assume charge of bringing the Yousafzai organisation and unity back. Ayub son of Rusi, Babu son of Saifu Aba Khel Mandanr, Mirwais son of Mullah Meru, and other Yousafzai personalities participated in the jirga that he organised after consulting his friends and followers. This jirga travelled across Yousafzai's country, preaching about unity and issuing dire warnings about the effects of division.

According to Ain-i-Akbari, Kalu Khan accompanied Mughal Emperor Akbar to Agra when he visited the Kabul area to reprimand Mirza Muhammad. He received favourable treatment, but subsequently left Agra. He was detained close to Attock by Khwaja Shamsuddin Khwafi, who then took him to court. He once more escaped and returned to his own country, where he rose to prominence as the head of the seditious elements. How, why, and under what conditions Akbar brought Kalu Khan to Agra are not explicitly described by Abu Fazal.

The Yousafzai had chosen Ghazi Khan Malezai to lead them in Kalu Khan's absence. But soon after, Ghazi Khan was murdered in a conflict with the Mughals at Bajaur. In the fight, Kalu Khan, who had just returned from Agra, also took part. At a meeting, Yousafzai tribesmen re-elected him as the tribe's leader in Damghar, Swat.

The Mughals were incited against by Kalu Khan's people. After some initial wins, the Yousafzai suffered significant casualties, and Zain Khan Koka was dispatched to defeat them. In 1586, Akbar despatched Said Khan Ghakkar, Abu Fateh, and Birbal to aid Zain Khan. The united troops of Zain Khan and Birbal were then routed by the Yusufzai Afghans under the command of Kalu Khan between the Karakar Pass and the Malandrai Pass. In this conflict, Birbal lost his life. According to Mughal historian Khafi Khan, this fight resulted in the deaths of 40,000–50,000 Mughal warriors. However, according to Badoani, this entire incident resulted in the deaths of close to 8000 Mughal warriors. One of Akbar's biggest and possibly the greatest military setback was this. According to reports, he expressed his sorrow over Birbal, his favorite courtier, dying.

== Legacy ==
The village of Swabi District, "Kalu Khan" village named after Kalu Khan Yousafzai. It is located at 34°13'0N 72°18'0E with an altitude of 317 meters (1043 feet).

== See also ==
- Afghan-Mughal Wars
- Graveyard of empires
- Yusufzai Afghans
- Kushal Khan Khattak
- Aimal Khan Mohmand
- Darya Khan Afridi
