= Aziz Dheri =

Archaeological site in Khyber Pakhtunkhwa, Pakistan

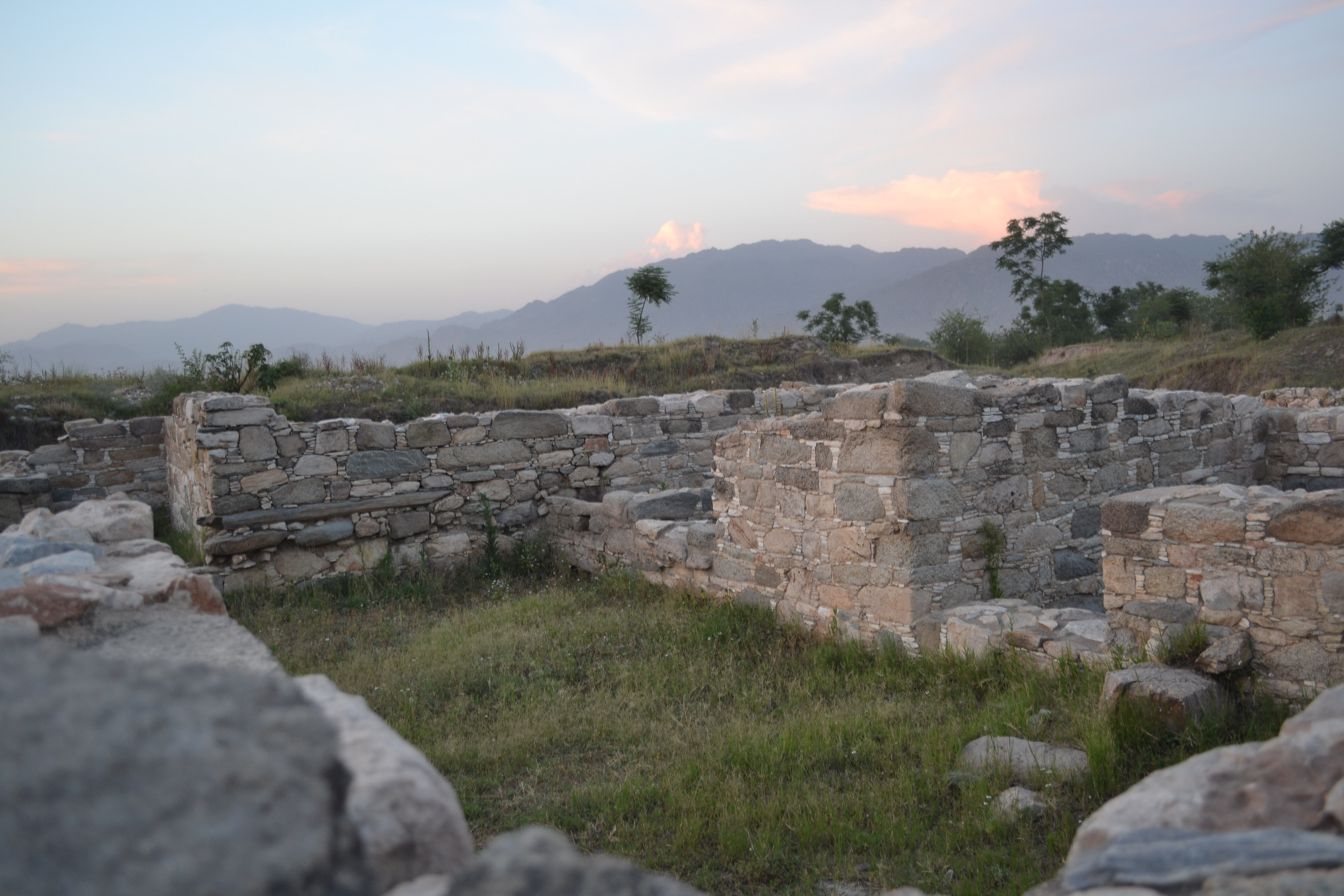
- Interactive map of Aziz Dheri
- Location: Aziz Dheri, Swabi District, Khyber Pakhtunkhwa, Pakistan

Site notes
- Owner: Government of Khyber Pakhtunkhwa
- Management: Khyber Pakhtunkhwa Culture and Tourism Authority
- Public access: yes

Aziz Dheri is an city ruin and archaeological site featuring Buddhist mounds (known as stupas), located in Swabi District, Khyber Pakhtunkhwa, Pakistan.

The site was last excavated in 2013, by Dr Shah Nazar Khan, leading to the discovery of four stupas, one of which was determined to be the largest on the subcontinent. It also features residences and a monastery.
