= Ambar, Khyber Pakhtunkhwa =

Anbar, Swabi انبار
- Location within Khyber Pakhtunkhwa Location within Pakistan
- Country: Pakistan
- Province: Khyber-Pakhtunkhwa
- District: Peshawar District
- Time zone: UTC+5 (PST)

Anbar is a village in the Swabi District of Khyber Pakhtunkhwa in Pakistan. It is located at 34 02 50 N and 72 24 40 E at an altitude of 1010 ft. Anbar is the financial hub of Swabi District. Tajukhel & Balarkhel are the 2 sub castes of Yousafzai living in Anbar. Anbar has a very fertile land and the main crops are Tobacco, Wheat and Maize. Anbar has a literacy rate of over 90%.

== University of Swabi ==
In 2012 the Government of Khyber Pakhtunkhwa inaugurated the University of Swabi at Ambar. The university campus is spread over 200 kanals and is the first public sector university in Swabi.
