= Mir Azam =

Pakistani cricketer (born 1978)

Mir Azam Khan
Personal information
- Born: 15 January 1978 (age 48); Parmoli, Swabi District, Khyber Pakhtunkhwa
- Batting: Right-handed
- Source: Cricinfo, 27 November 2015

Mir Azam (born 15 January 1978) is a Pakistani first-class cricketer who played for the Abbottabad cricket team.
