= Maniri Payan =

Coordinates: 34°7′54″N 72°26′46″E

Maneri Payan is a town and Union Council of Swabi District in Khyber-Pakhtunkhwa province of Pakistan. Coordinates:

Taskeen Manerwal, a prominent Pashto poet, was from Maneri Payan.
