= Jabar, Tordher =

Village in Swabi, Pakistan

Jabar is a small village in the vicinity of Tordher, District Swabi, Pakistan.
