= Asota =

Coordinates: 34°14′0″N 72°21′0″E

Asota is a town near Shewa Adda and Union Council of Swabi District in the Khyber-Pakhtunkhwa province of Pakistan. It is located at 34°14'0N 72°21'0E with an altitude of 340 metres (1118 feet).
