= Muhammad Ghufran Khan =

Pakistani politician

Haji Muhammad Ghufran Khan is a Pakistani politician from Sheikh Jana in Swabi District, Khyber Pakhtunkhwa. Senator Ghufran is the senior vice-chairman of the Qaumi Watan Party (QWP) and has held several political positions, including serving as a member of the Senate of Pakistan from 2006 to 2012, and as a caretaker provincial minister in the Government of Khyber Pakhtunkhwa in 2023.

== Early Political Career ==
=== Local Government ===
Ghufran Khan began his political career in local governance in Khyber Pakhtunkhwa:

- Member of the District Council, Mardan and Swabi from 1979 to 1991.
- Chairman of the District Council Swabi for six months in 1992.

== Senate of Pakistan (2006–2012) ==
Ghufran Khan was elected as a Senator in March 2006, representing Khyber Pakhtunkhwa under the Pakistan People's Party Sherpao (PPP‑S), and served until March 2012.

== Ministry (2023) & Political Activity ==
After completing his Senate term, Ghufran Khan continued involvement in regional and provincial politics:

- Qaumi Watan Party (QWP): Ghufran Khan holds a senior leadership role in the party, serving as senior vice-chairman and being recognized as one of its key leaders in Khyber Pakhtunkhwa.
- Caretaker Provincial Minister (January 2023): Appointed to the caretaker provincial cabinet in Khyber Pakhtunkhwa. Notably, Ghufran Khan was the only minister who declined all salaries, allowances, staff, and official residences during his tenure.

== Regional Influence ==
Ghufran Khan's political base is in Swabi District, Khyber Pakhtunkhwa.
