= Bam Khel =

Village in Khyber Pakhtunkhwa, Pakistan

- Village
- Location within Pakistan
- Coordinates: 34°6′0″N 72°32′0″E
- Country: Pakistan
- Province: Khyber Pakhtunkhwa
- Headquarters: Swabi

Area
  - Total: 154 km^{2} (59 sq mi)

Population (1998)
  - Total: 30,000
- Time zone: UTC+5 (PST)

"BamKhel" in Pashto (بام خیل) is a village and Union Council of Swabi District in Khyber Pakhtunkhwa, Pakistan. It is located at 34°6'0N 72°32'0E with an altitude of 321 metres (1,053 ft).

Bamkhel means the place on height Some sources are saying that this name comes because of Bam Baba (بام بابا) the founder and grandfather of Bamkhelies. who migrated from Buneer centenaries ago. The village is mainly divided into different parts called "Mohalla" and "Banda". There are a total of four (04) Mohallas in village Bamkhel. Details are given below:

- Madda Khel (Mohalla)
- Jaffar Khel (The largest Mohalla)
- Younas Khel (Mohalla)
- Budla Khel (Mohalla)
- Kachkol Banda
- Yousaf Abad
- Iqbal Abad
- Khabeer Banda
- Mohammad Banda (kado laar)
- Mirza Khan Banda
- Bezad Banda (Jabar)
- Shareef Abad (Madakhel)
- Lalu Dheri
- Yaseen Abad (Lalu Dheri)
- Shahbaz Khel (Madakhel)
- Lal khel

== Demographics ==
The literacy rate of Bam Khel is very low at 29.7%, according to an official census conducted in 1998.

== Education ==
There is one Commerce college, one higher secondary school for boys and a high school for girls, three primary schools for boys and two primary schools for girls. In addition to government schools several private schools and colleges are also there.

== Health ==
There is only one dispensary in the village servicing around 30,000 inhabitants and also private medical stores.
