= Karnal Sher Kallay =

- Union Council
- Country: Pakistan
- Province: Khyber Pakhtunkhwa
- District: Swabi
- Tehsil: Razar Tehsil

Population (2023 census)
  - Total: 27,787
- Time zone: UTC+5 (PST)

Karnal Sher Kallay is a town and Union council (Pakistan) of the Razar Tehsil in Swabi District in Khyber Pakhtunkhwa province of Pakistan. It was formerly known as Nawe Killi (New Village), until it was renamed in honor of Karnal Sher Khan's Shahadat during the Kargil War.

== Demographics ==
=== Population ===
Historical population
Year	Pop.	±% p.a.
1951	...	—
1961	7,139	—
1972	9,873	+2.99%
1981	11,957	+2.15%
1998	18,082	+2.46%
2017	26,214	+1.97%
2023	27,787	+0.98%

As of the 2023 census, Karnal Sher Kallay had a population of 27,787.

== See also ==
- Districts of Pakistan
  - Districts of Khyber Pakhtunkhwa
