= Yaqubi, Pakistan =

Yaqubi
- Village
- یعقوبی
- Location within Pakistan
- Coordinates: 34.156438°N 72.270094°E
- Country: Pakistan
- Province: Khyber Pakhtunkhwa
- District: Swabi
- Tehsil: Razzar

Yaqubi
- Union Council
- Interactive map of Yaqubi
- Country: Pakistan
- Province: Khyber Pakhtunkhwa
- District: Swabi
- Time zone: UTC+5 (PST)

Yaqubi is a village and union council in the Razar Tehsil of the Swabi District, Pakistan. Yaqubi is in the Khyber Pakhtunkhwa province of Pakistan, lying about 25 kilometres from Mardan and 85 kilometres from the provincial capital of Peshawar.

== See also ==
- Swabi District
