= Jhanda =

Settlement in Pakistan

Coordinates: 34°9′0″N 72°35′0″E

Jhanda is a village and Union Council in Swabi District of Khyber-Pakhtunkhwa. It is located at 34°9'0N 72°35'0E with an altitude of 391 metres (1286 feet). Its history dates back to the early 1800s when Maiz Ullah Khan a Pashtun leader from the Yusufzai tribe gave control over Jhanda to his two sons, Khan Bahadur Abdul Qadar Khan and Fateh Khan. The village has since passed down seven generations and is still owned for the most part by the same Khan family.

Jhanda has green dusty mountains, and agriculture everywhere.
