= Gaju Khan =

Pashtun revolutionary leader (1490–1565)

Gaju Khan Baba
- ګجو خان بابا
- Born: 1490; Kabul, in present-day Afghanistan
- Died: 1565 (aged 74–75); Swabi, in present-day Khyber Pakhtunkhwa, Pakistan
- Occupation: Revolutionary leader
- Known for: Battle of Shaikh Tapur; Conquest of Swat; Conquest of Mardan
- Title: Khan Al Khawanin
- Predecessor: Malak Ahmad Khan Yusufzai
- Successor: Malak Mesri Khan Yusufzai
- Children: Ibrahim Khan Yousafzai
- Parents: Malak Qarar Khan Yousafzai (father); Mowanda Bibi (mother)

Malak Gaju Khan Yousafzai (Pashto: ګجو خان بابا), also spelled Gajju Khan or Gajo Khan Yousafzai, popularly known as Khan Al Khawanin or Khan of Khans, was a Pashtun ruler and military commander from Yousafzai chieftaincy. He is often seen as a founding chief of the tribe.

Gaju Khan once served under the banner of Sher Shah Suri until he rose to the chieftaincy of his own tribe. His tomb is in Swabi, Khyber Pakhtunkhwa.

== Early life ==
Gaju Khan, a notable figure from the Mandanr branch of the Pashtun Yusufzai tribe, was born in 1490 to Malik Qara Khan, son of Malik Behzad Yousafzai, in Kabul. His family was well-known for its power and wealth. Gaju Khan lost his father at a young age, and his education and upbringing were overseen by his mother, Mowanda Bibi, who paid special attention to his religious and worldly learning. Mowanda Bibi also introduced him to the art of warfare. She was known throughout Afghanistan at the time as a virtuous, and devout woman.

== Legacy ==
The Gajju Khan Medical College Swabi is named after him.

== See also ==
- Darya Khan Afridi
- Aimal Khan Mohmand
- Kalu Khan Yousafzai
