= University of Swabi =

Public university in Khyber Pakhtunkhwa, Pakistan

- د صوابی پوهنتون
- Type: Public
- Established: 2012
- Founder: Ihsan Ali (SI)
- Accreditation: Higher Education Commission of Pakistan
- Officer in charge: M. Asfandyar Khan Khalil (Registrar)
- Chancellor: Governor of Khyber Pakhtunkhwa
- Vice-Chancellor: Nasir Jamal Khattak
- Dean: Mukhtar Alam
- Head: M. Asfandyar Khan Khalil
- Location: Swabi, Khyber Pakhtunkhwa, Pakistan
- Campus: 76 ha
- Website: uoswabi.edu.pk

University Of Swabi (Pashto: د صوابی پوهنتون; Urdu: یونیورسٹی آف صوابی; abbreviated UoS), is a public sector university situated in Anbar, Swabi in Khyber Pakhtunkhwa, Pakistan.

== Overview & History ==
University of Swabi is established by KP government in Anbar, Swabi in 2012. Back in 2012, the ANP led Government of Khyber Pakhtunkhwa decided to upgrade Abdul Wali Khan University Mardan campus to full-fledged University using the royalties of electricity generation and tobacco of Swabi district.

The university offers undergraduate and postgraduate programs in 28 teaching Departments such as Agriculture, Law, Economics, Computer Science, Linguistics to name a few.

== Departments & Faculties ==
The university currently has the following departments and Faculties.

- Department of Agriculture
- Department of Computer Science
- Department of Economics
- Department of English
- Department of Geology
- Department of Management Sciences
- Department of Microbiology
- Department of PCRS
- Department of Pharmacy
- Department of Sociology
- Department of Zoology
- Department of Chemistry
- Department of Statistics
- Department of Physics
- Department of Mathematics
- Department of Law
- Department of Environmental Sciences
- Department of Botany
- Department of Biotechnology
- Department of Library & Information Sciences
- Department of Journalism & Mass Communication
- Department of Political Science
- Department of Geography
- Department of Psychology
- Department of Education
- Department of Tourism & Hotel Management
- Department of Urdu
- Department of Pashto

== See also ==
- Ghulam Ishaq Khan Institute of Engineering Sciences and Technology
- Women University Swabi
- Government Postgraduate College Swabi
- Universities in Pakistan
