= Gar Munara =

Village in Pakistan

Coordinates: 34°01′N 72°31′E

Gar Munara (Urdu: گاڑمنارہ) is a village located on the bank of the Indus River, in Swabi, Khyber Pakhtunkhwa, Pakistan, near the town of Marghuz. Thousands of visitors across Pakistan visit Gar Munara every year, especially in summer to enjoy the Indus River. The village council has a population of around 11,000. Most of the people are government workers or public servants or working abroad in many countries including UAE, Saudi arabia, UK and USA etc. The village's only bank, HBL, is located in the center of the village which has been recently moved to Zarobi, a nearby village. The main crops are wheat, corn, sugarcane, and tobacco. Resorts in Gar Munara include Rahat Khan Bangla and Ameer Sher Khan Bangla. Gar Munara village is surrounded by several other villages: Dhok to its east, Moosa Banda to its west, and Marghuz to its north, with the Indus River to its south. The literacy rate is high in this area. There is one matriculation school for boys, and one for girls. There is also one primary school for boys and one for girls. A new college for girls. The Primary resident of Gar Munara are the branches of Khudadadkhel( Khanan and Khankhel) and Balarkhel( Muhammadikhel) of Mir Ahmed Khel subtribe of Mandarh Yousafzais. The adjoining village of Gar Akakhel has residents belonging to Akakhel branch of Mir Ahmed Khel subtribe of Mandanr Yousafzais. and Union Council of Swabi District in Khyber-Pakhtunkhwa.
