= Gandaf =

- Town and union council
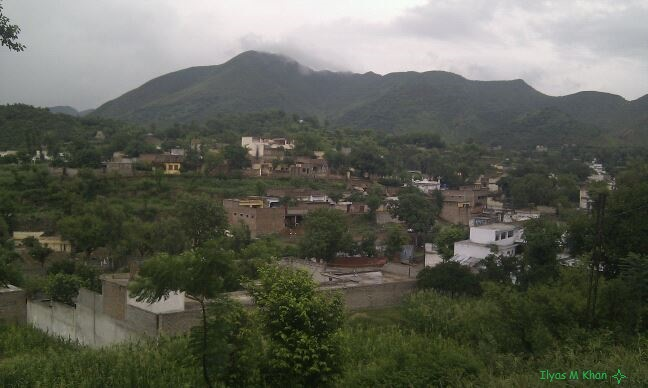

- Location in Pakistan Gandaf (Pakistan)
- Coordinates: 34.1240489°N 72.6677155°E
- Country: Pakistan
- Region: Khyber Pakhtunkhwa
- District: Swabi District
- Tehsil: Swabi Tehsil
- Time zone: UTC+5 (PST)

Gandaf is a town and Union Council of Swabi District in the Khyber Pakhtunkhwa province of Pakistan. It is located at 34°7'0N 72°41'0E with an altitude of 538 metres (1768 feet). Gandaf is surrounded by a mountain range, and is very close to the Gadoon Amazi industrial estate. Gandaf is the capital village of Area Gadoon where only the Pashtun tribe 'Gadoon' resides. The Indus River is also attached to this village. Due to the lack of colleges and universities, many Gadoon went to Swabi or to other places.

Gandaf is a dry area and it only depends on rains. It is close to a Tarbela Dam, which is mostly mud. There are small amounts of fields available for agriculture purpose. There is also a lack of hospitals in the area. Gadoon is under the administrative rule of 1952, but to date, basic facilities are still provided. Unemployment rates are also increasing due to the lack of jobs. There is big need for afforestation and plantation.
