= Turlandi =

Pakistani village

Turlandi ترلاندی
- Village
- Location of Turlandi in Pakistan Turlandi (Pakistan)
- Coordinates: 34.208708°N 72.321187°E
- Country: Pakistan
- Province: Khyber Pakhtunkhwa
- District: Swabi
- Tehsil: Razzar
- Time zone: UTC+05:00 (PKT)
- Postal code: 23420
- Area code: +92 938

Turlandi (Pashto: ترلاندی) is a village near Shewa Adda and a Union Council in Razar Tehsil, Swabi District of Khyber-Pakhtunkhwa, Pakistan. The village is situated at an elevation of 320 meters (1,050 feet).

Kalu Khan Yousafzai, a leading figure of the Yousafzai tribe, is believed to be buried in Turlandi. He is noted for resisting Mughal expansion under Emperor Jalal-ud-Din Muhammad Akbar and is associated with the Battle of the Malandari Pass (1586) near the Karakar Pass. His gravesite remains locally venerated.

Local residents of Turlandi believe that the tomb of Ayaz, the renowned general of King Mahmud of Ghazni, is located in the village. However, there is no concrete evidence to substantiate this claim, and the site is currently referred to as nadaan baba's tomb.

The famous Pashto folktale Yusuf Khan and Sherbano has a special connection with Turlandi, as one of its central characters, Yusuf Khan belonged to Turlandi. The 1970 film Yousuf Khan Sher Bano, is regarded as the first Pashto-language film in Pakistan and includes scenes filmed in Turlandi.

== History ==
The name Turlandi is a modified form of the name Toolanday (Pashto: تولاندے) as used today. Toolanday means “up and down”, which is implicitly explained by the presence of a small mountain locally called Ghunday. It is one of the oldest villages of the area with diverse Pukhtoon/Pashtun cultural bonds. The nearby small villages Khwaja, Shagai, Tuti Banda, Qadamai, and Kaludher have originated from and historically formed part of this village.

Multiple regional and subcontinental political figures have visited Turlandi during different historical periods. The former Indian prime minister Jawaharlal Nehru along with his daughter visited Turlandi in an effort to gain the support of Pashtoons prior to the partition of British India. Similarly, Liaquat Ali Khan also visited Turlandi to persuade local residents to vote in favor of Pakistan during the Pakistan Movement. Zulfikar Ali Bhutto later visited Turlandi and met local deputy Muhammad Zaman. Other prominent figures, including Allama Mashriqi, Bacha Khan, and Abdul Wali Khan, are also reported to have visited the village during different political phases.

== Demographics ==
As of 2014, village council records indicate that Turlandi has a population of approximately 35,000.

The inhabitants of Turlandi belong predominantly to the Razzar clan of the Mandanr branch of the Yousafzai tribe. Tribal structure plays a key role in local governance, identity, and traditional leadership.

The main tribes (clans) dwelling in Turlandi are Ali Khan Khel, Dawran Khel, Mayagan, Jan Muhammad Khel, Amir Khel, Qabool Khel, Sundi Khel, Babi Khel, Buran Khel, and Pacheer Khel. The literacy rate is relatively better than in earlier decades and is increasing steadily, particularly among younger generations.

People of Turlandi earn a living primarily through agriculture, including the cultivation of wheat, tobacco, vegetables, maize, and sugarcane, alongside small businesses; a significant portion of the population is also employed in government services.

Turlandi is located close to the nearby market town of Shewa Adda, which is one of the largest commercial centers in Swabi District. Shewa Adda serves as a commercial hub for trade, agricultural sales, and livestock exchange for surrounding villages, including Turlandi.

== Culture ==
Residents of Turlandi traditionally consume simple foods and wear customary attire such as shalwar kameez. Offering black tea to guests is a common social practice, reflecting local customs of hospitality.

The famous Pashto folktale love couple Yusuf Khan and Sherbano is also associated with Turlandi. The film Yousuf Khan Sher Bano (1970), regarded as the first Pashto-language film produced in Pakistan, was partially shot in Turlandi.

Residents of Turlandi are generally noted within the Swabi region for close-knit communal living patterns and a strong tradition of hospitality, consistent with wider Pashtunwali values.

The cultural life of Turlandi reflects broader traditions of the Yousafzai Pashtun community of Khyber Pakhtunkhwa. The local population predominantly follows Pashtun social norms rooted in Pashtunwali, including hospitality (melmastia), honor (nang), and community protection and support (badal and nanawatai). Traditional gatherings, jirga-based dispute resolution, and communal decision-making remain part of the village’s social structure.

Pashto is the primary spoken language in Turlandi, while Urdu and English are understood for educational and administrative purposes. Cultural dress typically includes shalwar kameez, with men often wearing the pakol or turban, and women traditionally observing modest attire in accordance with regional customs.

Turlandi maintains oral storytelling traditions, folk songs, and seasonal celebrations similar to those found across the Yousafzai belt. Weddings and communal events commonly feature traditional Pashto musical instruments such as the rabab and mangay, accompanied by folk dance forms practiced throughout the region.

Agricultural practices shape much of village life, with wheat, maize, and tobacco historically cultivated in surrounding fields. Social gatherings often coincide with harvest seasons, religious festivals such as Eid al-Fitr and Eid al-Adha, and other Pashtun cultural occasions, contributing to community cohesion and shared identity.

== Historical figures ==
Kalu Khan Yousafzai, a prominent leader of the Yousafzai tribe, is being buried in Turlandi. Historical sources associate him with resistance against Mughal expansion under Emperor Akbar. Regional historiographers link him to the Battle of the Malandari Pass (1586), fought near the Karakar Pass. His gravesite in Turlandi remains locally recognized and venerated.

Local tradition holds that the tomb of Ayaz—renowned general of Mahmud of Ghazni—is also located in the village; however, no verifiable archaeological or historical evidence supports this attribution, and the site is commonly referred to as “Nadaan Baba’s” tomb.

The romantic Pashto folktale Yusuf Khan and Sherbano is a well-known qissa (oral narrative) in the region. Its poetic version, composed by Ali Haidar Joshi in the 1960s, later inspired the film Yousuf Khan Sher Bano (1970), the first-ever Pashto-language film released in Pakistan. Portions of the film were shot in Turlandi.

== Archeological sites ==
Turlandi is regarded as an ancient settlement area due to the presence of multiple archaeological remains in and around the village, indicating long-term human occupation. These sites contain material evidence ranging from protohistoric to early historic periods, including architectural elements, pottery, figurines, and megalithic structures, reflecting the region’s cultural continuity within the wider Gandhara zone.

• Turlandi Ghunda / Turlandi Dherai / Turlandi Megaliths :

The archaeological site locally known as Turlandi Ghunda—also referred to as Turlandi Dherai or the Turlandi megaliths—represents a single cultural complex located approximately 20 km south-west of Swabi. The site originally covered about 1.7 hectares but has partially been levelled due to agricultural activity.

Surface collections and earlier surveys have yielded a diverse assemblage of artifacts, including wheel-made pottery, miniature pots, pedestals, decorated body sherds, and terracotta stands. Many pottery fragments are red in colour, medium-textured, and decorated with floral motifs, with some vessels bearing red slip on their exterior surfaces.

Terracotta human and animal figurines have also been recovered. Human figurines typically depict slender female forms with small bodies and knotted hair combed backward, while animal figurines commonly represent bulls, elephants, and sheep with prominent and stylized features. Additional finds include terracotta balls, beads, a copper ear-ring, crystal glass fragments, and semi-precious stones, suggesting domestic, ritual, and decorative usage.

The site further contains megalithic structures situated within a local graveyard. These consist of large, roughly quarried stone blocks arranged in a square formation, differing from the circular layout observed at the nearby Asota megaliths. Geological analysis suggests that both sites utilized similar raw stone material, indicating shared construction traditions within the region.

Wooden architectural elements, including carved wooden capitals featuring detailed floral designs, have also been documented from the area, pointing to advanced craftsmanship and decorative architectural practices in earlier settlement phases.

• Qadami Dherai :

Qadami Dherai is a separate archaeological site located approximately 8 km west of Nawan Killi, covering an area of about 0.6 hectares. Although the site is presently occupied by a modern village, archaeological material has been recovered from its surface.

Finds from Qadami Dherai include broken wheel-made vessels, bowl sherds, and finely textured terracotta figurines. Two heavily corroded and illegible coins were reportedly recovered by local inhabitants, one of which has tentatively been attributed to the Hindu Shahi period, though definitive identification remains uncertain.

The material evidence from Qadami Dherai suggests localized settlement activity and craft production, contributing to the broader archaeological landscape of the Swabi region.
