= Government Post Graduate College, Swabi =

Pakistani college

Coordinates: 34°09′41.9″N 72°24′42.7″E

Government Postgraduate College Swabi
- Type: Public
- Established: 1962
- Location: Swabi, Khyber Pakhtunkhwa, Pakistan

Government Post Graduate College, Swabi is a postgraduate college in the Swabi District of Khyber Pakhtunkhwa in Pakistan. The college currently offers programs for inter level in Arts and Science groups plus it also offers courses in 4 years BS degrees and 2 years master's degree courses in Political Science & Economics.

== History ==
It was established in 1962 as inter college in Gohati village of Swabi District. Initially the college campus was established in Government Primary School Swabi premises. In 1963, the college was moved to its current location for which the land of 110 canals was denoted by people of Maneri village. Initially, Pre-medical and Pre-Engineering classes were offered. The college was upgraded to degree level in 1964 and degree courses were offered in Chemistry, Botany, Zoology, Mathematics and Physics.

In 2003, the college was upgraded to post-graduate level due to people's demand with master's degree courses in two subjects Political Science and Economics.

In 2012, the college introduced 4 years BS programs in Physics. Later, Chemistry, Botany, Economics and Political Science. The master's degree courses are shelved due to introduction of BS programs.

== Faculties and departments ==
The college currently have the following faculties and departments.

=== Social Sciences/Humanities ===
- Department of Archaeology
- Department of Pakistan Studies
- Department of English
- Department of Economics
- Department of Geography
- Department of Health & Physical Education
- Department of History
- Department of Islamiyat
- Department of Law
- Department of Urdu
- Department of Political Science
- Department of Library sciences
- Department of Pashto

=== Physical Sciences ===
- Department of Chemistry
- Department of Computer Science
- Department of Mathematics
- Department of Physics
- Department of Statistics
- Department of Electronics

=== Biological Sciences ===
- Department of Botany
- Department of Zoology

== Programs ==
The college currently offers the following programs.

=== BS Degrees (4 years) ===
- BS Physics
- BS Chemistry
- BS Botany
- BS Economics
- BS Political Science
- BS English
- BS Urdu
- BS Mathematics
- BS Islamiyat
- BS Computer Science
- BS Pashto
- BS Zoology

=== Intermediate ===
- FSc – Pre-Medical (2 years)
- FSc – Pre-Engineering (2 years)
- FSc – Computer Science (2 years)
- FA – General Science (2 years)
- FA – Humanities (2 years)

== Notable alumni ==
- Taskeen Manerwal
- Asad Qaiser
- Mushtaq Ahmad Khan
- Motasim Billah Shah
- Captain Karnal Sher Khan Shaeed (NH)
- Dr. Sabz Ali Khan (PAEC)

== See also ==
- University of Swabi
- Women University Swabi
