= Sheikh Jana =

Pakistani village

Sheikh Jana شیخ جانہ
- Town
- Location within Khyber Pakhtunkhwa Location within Pakistan
- Coordinates: 34°13′15″N 72°21′18″E
- Country: Pakistan
- Province: Khyber Pakhtunkhwa
- District: Swabi
- Tehsil: Razzar
- Time zone: UTC+05:00 (PKT)
- Postal code: 23320
- Area code: +92 938

Sheikh Jana, earlier Ram Jana, is a town near Shewa Adda and Union Council of Swabi District in Khyber-Pakhtunkhwa, Pakistan. Sheikh Jana is an old and historic village of Swabi. The old name was due to a Rama idol, which was placed in the center of the village. Before the partition of India, Sheikh Jana was a Hindu majority village.

Sheikh Jana is situated 15 km far from Swabi Center. It borders Kernel Sher Kalli (Nawi Kalli), Spin Kanri, Shewa Kalli, Asota Sharif and Mansabdar.

== Demographics ==
The population is approximately 40,000. After Partition, all Hindus of that area migrated to India. Their worship places are present in the area. The majority of residents are Yousafzai and Akhunzada. Some residents migrated from other places.

The people are mostly middle lower class.

== Economy ==
The main source of income is agriculture. Main corps grown here are Wheat, Maize and Tobacco. Many former residents work abroad, mostly in KSA and UAE. Others hold government jobs including teachers, police, health workers and other departments. There is also a group of construction workers.

== Culture ==
The main games are kabaddi and cricket. Some people play football and badminton. The main mohallas are Kara Khel, Shahi Khel, Ahmad Khel, Koz Ahmad khel, Landay Cham, Nako Khel, Ali Sher Khel, Gharay Cham, Ismail Khel, Saif Ud Din Khel and Shobla Cham.

== Education ==
There is one higher secondary school for boys and one middle school for girls. Four private schools educate boys and girls separately.

== Notable people ==
- Haji Muhammad Ghufran Khan, politician and former Member of the Senate of Pakistan and Minister of Minerals and Mines of Khyber Pakhtunkhwa
- Mushtaq Ahmad Khan, member of the Senate of Pakistan
