= Thandkoi =

Pakistan village

Coordinates: 34°4′8″N 72°32′1″E

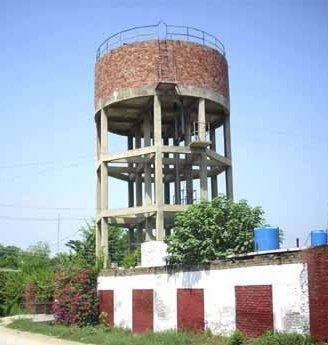
Thandkoi at main road

Thandkoi is a historic village of Swabi District of Khyber Pakhtunkhwa Province of Pakistan. The population is about 30,000. Thandkoi is situated on the main Jehangira-Topi road. A small village Dodher is located on its south, to the north of Thandkoi is Bamkhel, east Marghuz and to the west is Kaddi and Zaida.

The village has its own Union Council, called Union council Thandkoi including Thandkoi, Kaddi and Dodher whose first nazim was Haji Malik adam Khan. There is a branch of (National Bank), one Hospital, a dozen schools and Post Office.

Mandanr Yousafzai, one of the main clans of Pathan/Pakhtoon/Pashtun are settled here Yousafzai originated from Yousaf who was the younger son of Manday Khan. Yousaf's elder brother was Umar, who died young and left his only son named Mandanr. Mandanr later married to Yousaf's daughter. But for simplicity, they are called Yousafzai instead of Mandanr Yousafzi.

In Thandkoi, they are further subdivided into a number of Pashtoon groups called khels locally. These Pashtoon khels are indeed the khans and maliks of the area. The significant among them are Baba khel, Jalal Khel, Hasan khel, Jana Khel, Norang Khel, Musa khel, Bara khan khel, chajo khel, Adi khel, Dadu khel and Lazaq.These khels are the subdivision groups of (Jana khel) and (Babu khel) who are the sons of Mir Ahmad Khel. Mulayan, now are mixed with several Khels, by living in the communities of different Khels and marrying between them, is also one of their social identity, well educated and stronger in a financial point of view living in the village.

There are some other minorities living in the village as well. Among them are Dhobyan, Malyaraan,Tarkanan,Teelyaan,Myagaan,MulayaanShahakhelyan, Duman, Nayan, Chumyaran, Julagan, etc.

Yousafzai came from Afghanistan in the 16th century in the times of Mughal King Babur and started fighting with the local residents. They fought and defeated the Tanoli: one of the local tribes living in the area for long, at Topi which is a town of District Swabi. Since then they are living in the area.

As far as politics is concerned, Thand koi changes its views on every election. In the Musharraf era it was a strong supporter of the MMA party but at the same time its people supported Haji Adam Khan of MMA Party to become the first Nazim of local government system. The late Haji Adam khan served as a village Nazim and the late Haji Zar Khan as a farmer counselor, supported by Bahadar sher (late) Noorsher (Late) and Amir sher (late) in the election, also belong to the respectable family Babakhel.

In 2008 Election Pervez Advocate became the MNA from ANP. In the 2013 election its people supported both PTI and PMLN, eventually ending in PTI success.

Its soil is fertile. So many of the villagers are associated with farming. Tobacco is a cash crop of the village along with wheat, vegetables, sugar cane, maize, and rice. Some fruits like watermelon, peaches, and apricots are also grown here.

Thandkoi is also famous for its colourful traditional games: Kabaddi, Makha, Gulli dandai, kite flying and nowadays cricket and football are some of the activities villagers like the most.

Thand Koi has more than 10 schools – presumably one of the highest for any village of its size in Pakistan. There are several Deeni Madrassa (religious schools) teaching Islamic education.
