= Shewa Tehsil =

Shewa Tehsil تحصیل شیوہ شېوا تحصیل
- Tehsil
- Country: Pakistan
- Region: Khyber Pakhtunkhwa
- District: North Waziristan
- Seat: Shewa

Population (2017)
  - Total: 39,349
- Time zone: UTC+5 (PST)

Shewa Tehsil is a subdivision located in North Waziristan District, Khyber Pakhtunkhwa, Pakistan. The population is 39,349 according to the 2017 census.

== See also ==
- List of tehsils of Khyber Pakhtunkhwa
