= Karnal Sher Khan =

Pakistani military officer and tenth recipient of Pakistan's highest military award

Shēr-e-Kargil Captain Karnal Sher Khan NH
- Born: 1 January 1970; Swabi, Khyber Pakhtunkhwa, Pakistan
- Died: 5 July 1999 (aged 29); Tiger Hill peak
- Burial place: Karnal Sher Khan Kallay (formerly known as Naway Kallay), Swabi, Khyber Pakhtunkhwa
- Military career
- Allegiance: Pakistan
- Branch: Pakistan Air Force; Pakistan Army
- Service years: 1994–1999
- Rank: Captain
- Nickname: Lion of Kargil
- Units: 27th Sind Regiment; 12th Northern Light Infantry
- Conflicts: Kargil War; Battle of Tiger Hill †
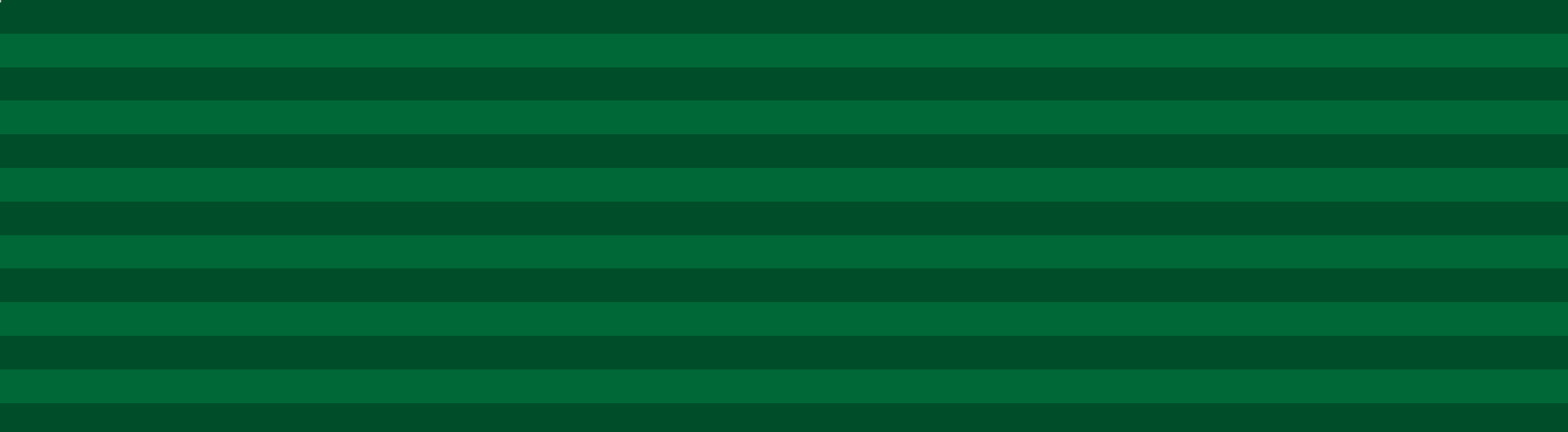
- Awards: Nishan-e-Haider

Karnal Sher Khan NH (1 January 1970 – 5 July 1999) was a Pakistani military officer and the tenth recipient of Pakistan's highest military gallantry award, Nishan-e-Haider. He was a captain in the 27th Sindh Regiment of the Pakistan Army and later was posted to 12th NLI Regiment during the Kargil War, where was later killed in action during the conflict. For his actions during the Kargil War, he was awarded the Nishan-e-Haider. His name is the localised form of the rank Colonel.

== Early life ==
Karnal Sher Khan was born on 1 January 1970 into the Yusufzai tribe of Pashtuns of Naway Kallay village (now Karnal Sher Khan Kallay village), located in Swabi, Khyber Pakhtunkhwa. His father's name was Hazar Khan. He was the youngest of two brothers and two sisters and his mother died when he was 6 years old which left him to be raised by his father.

Khan completed his intermediate education at a government postgraduate college in Swabi and later joined Pakistan Armed Forces. Throughout his life, Khan cared about the poor people in his area and spent most part of his salary helping them.

== Military career ==
After completing his intermediate education, Khan first joined Pakistan Air Force (PAF) as an Airman in 1989, in Korangi he was in the Iqbal wing, he was roommate and a close friend of sqn\ldr Retd. M Mushtaq (who later served in PAF for 35 year as flight engineer ).Later Capt Karnal Sher Khan joined Pakistan Army as a commissioned officer in 1992,passing out from the 90th PMA Long Course. On 14 October 1994, Khan was commissioned in the 27th Sindh Regiment of Pakistan army.

During the Kargil War, Khan was deployed at the Gultari region. He along with his fellow soldiers established five strategic posts at height of 17,000 feet at Gultari. Indian Army launched eight attacks on their position to capture the strategic posts. However, Khan and his men were able to defend those strategic posts. On 5 July 1999, the Indian army launched another attack and surrounded his posts with two battalions. With heavy mortar fire, the Indian Army captured one of his posts. Khan personally led a successful counter-attack and was able to re-capture the lost post. Despite shortage of ammunition and men, Khan was successful in forcing the enemy to retreat. However, during the battle he was hit by machine gun fire and was killed in action.

Indian Army Brigadier M. P. S. Bajwa was impressed by the actions of Captain Khan and wrote to the government of Pakistan citing the bravery of the young officer. Bajwa wrote a citation for Khan and placed it in his pocket while returning his body to the Pakistani officials. Khan's actions during the war were also vouched by his fellow Pakistani soldiers and Khan was posthumously awarded Pakistan's highest military honour, the Nishan-e-Haider.

== Awards and decorations ==
Nishan-e-Haider (NH)

== Legacy ==
Karnal Sher Khan's home town Naway Kallay was renamed as Karnal Sher Khan Kallay. A mausoleum was established in his hometown where his body lays in rest. Every year officials from the Pakistani Government and Pakistan Armed Forces and other locals visit the tomb to offer prayer.

A cadet college has been named after him in the village Ismaila near the native town of Karnal Sher Khan Shaheed (NH) (Karnal Sher Khan Cadet College Swabi) . It is located on the main Mardan-Swabi Road, approximately midway between Mardan (23 km) and Swabi (25 km). It can also be accessed from Grand Trunk Road through Nowshera-Mardan and from Swabi or Rashakai interchange on the Motorway (M1).

Interchange connecting near Mardan on M1 that intersects M1 with origin of M16 heading towards Swat valley has also been named after Sher Khan as Karnal Sher Khan Interchange. Similarly the toll plaza at the termination of southern end of M16 are also given name of Sher Khan as Karnal Sher Khan Toll Plaza. A road in the F-11 sector of Pakistan's capital city Islamabad is named after him. Many roads are named after him in military cantonments across the country most notably in Lahore and Rawalpindi Cantonments.

Moreover, government textbooks of Pakistan Studies also mention valiant tales of Karnal Sher Khan as part of their academic curriculum.

== See also ==
- Havaldar Lalak Jan
- Ashok Kumar (soldier)
