= Charbagh, Swabi =

Charbagh
- Location within Pakistan
- Coordinates: 34.10°N 72.24°E
- Country: Pakistan
- Province: Khyber Pakhtunkhwa
- Elevation: 352 m (1,155 ft)
- Time zone: UTC+5 (PST)

Charbagh is a town in the Khyber Pakhtunkhwa Province of Pakistan. It is part of Swabi District and is located at 34°10'30N 72°24'40E with an altitude of 352 metres (1158 feet).
