= Bachai =

Bachai Bachai dagi
- Town and union council
- Country: Pakistan
- Region: Khyber-Pakhtunkhwa
- District: Swabi District

Government
- Time zone: UTC+5 (PST)
- Area code: 0938

Bachai is a town and union council of Swabi District in Khyber-Pakhtunkhwa.
