= Gani Chatra =

- Union Council
- Country: Pakistan
- Province: Khyber Pakhtunkhwa
- District: Swabi
- Time zone: UTC+5 (PST)

Gani Chatra is a small village in a hilly area (Gadoon) in the tehsil of (Topi) in Swabi District, Khyber Pakhtunkhwa province, Pakistan.

== See also ==
- Swabi District
