= Saleem Khan, Khyber Pakhtunkhwa =

Pakistani village

Saleem Khan Khel
- Union Council
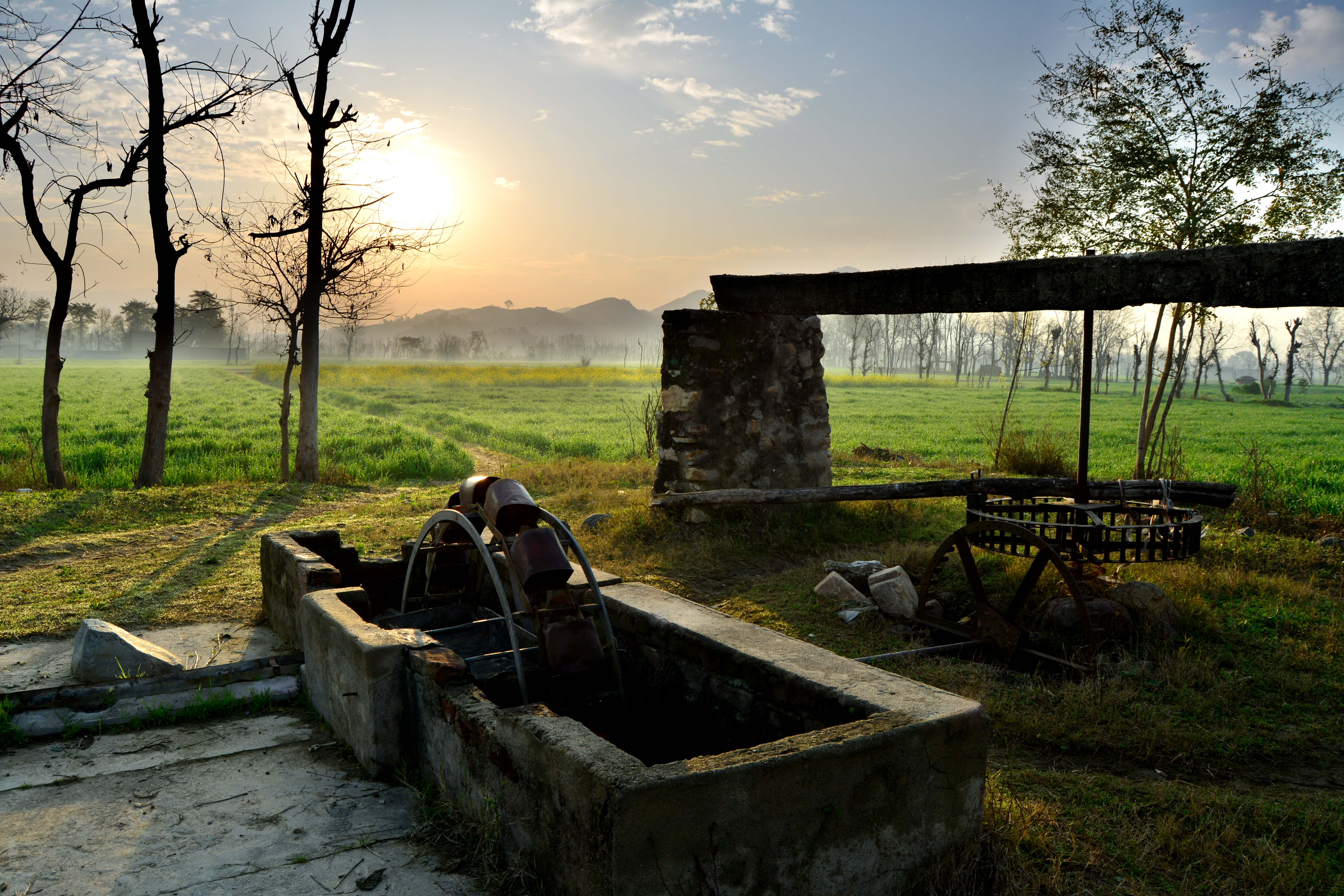

- Location within Pakistan
- Coordinates: 34°10′N 72°28′E
- Country: Pakistan
- Province: Khyber Pakhtunkhwa
- District: Swabi

Government
  - Nazim: Fazal Wahab

Area
  - Total: 19.43 km^{2} (7.50 sq mi)

Population (2012)
  - Total: 28,000
  - Estimate (2017): above 40,000
- Time zone: UTC+7 (PST)

Saleem Khan or Saleem Khan Khel is a town and Union Council of Swabi District in Khyber-Pakhtunkhwa, Pakistan. The village is 2 kilometres (1.2 mi) to the south of Buner District at an altitude of 348 metres (1,142 ft).

== Demographics ==
The area is divided into three major chams(boroughs) of including ‘Behzad-Khel Cham’ - ‘Mir-Ahmed-Khel Cham’ and (Bagarh Cham - باگڑھ) all with various sub-sects living in i.e. the first one, to the north includes Behzadkhel, Deewankhel and Khankhel etc. while the second to the south hosts Mirahmadkhel, Shah-Khan-khel (شاہ خان خیل), Yarakhel, Kandarkhel and Kamral.

The place settled by the Khankhels is called Gharghashti and is believed by many to be the historical epicentre of the Gharghashti(غرغښت) confederacy.

Bagarh, who is an Akhun Khel by lineage. Some people in Salim Khan call him Mullan. Salim Khan's first Hafiz of the Quran was Abdul Wahab Hafiz Sahib. The old name of Bakar was Bagrho Meera. Over time, Bagarh became Bakar.

More than 40,000 people live in Saleem Khan (according to an unofficial of 2017 national census). The population of the village is increasing rapidly.

== Geography ==
The Stefa canal crosses outskirts of the village. The canal goes underground for almost three kilometers.

== Economy ==
Inhabitants mostly depend on agriculture. Mining, cattle farms, poultry farm, Crops grown include wheat, maize, sugar cane, peas and tobacco. About 50% of the youth work overseas, especially in the United Arab Emirates, Saudi Arabia, Oman and the town is dependent on remittances from these overseas workers.

== Politics ==
It has three electoral wards: Village Council: 1.VC-Center, 2. VC-West and 3. VC-East

== Education ==
The literacy rate is 80-85% at primary school age, 60-65% at secondary school age and at college age these values are very low because every year young people leave the country to work. Thirteen primary schools for boys and nine primary schools for girls, one high, one middle school for boys & one higher secondary school for boys and one high school and two middle schools for girls are located there. Five private schools work there. Six large and many small Islamic madrasas are there, producing many Hufazi kiram and Ulema e kiram.

== See also ==
- Swabi District
- Slam khan is a compound word of the Pashto, Germanic and Vedic languages. Slam khan is a locative noun with absolute topographical and functional meaning. it's never been a Saleem khan. With the reference of toponym, Slam Khan is the adjectival form of the specific place-name.
