= Jabar (union council) =

- Union Council
- Country: Pakistan
- Province: Khyber Pakhtunkhwa
- District: Lower Dir
- Time zone: UTC+5 (PST)

Jabar is a union council of Upper Dir District in Khyber Pakhtunkhwa, Pakistan. Upper Dir District has 6 Tehsils and 28 union councils.

== See also ==
- Upper Dir District
