= Women University Swabi =

Public university in Swabi, Pakistan

- Type: Public
- Established: 2016
- Affiliations: Higher Education Commission of Pakistan
- Chancellor: Governor of Khyber Pakhtunkhwa
- Vice-Chancellor: Prof. Dr. Shahana Urooj Kazmi
- Location: Swabi, Khyber Pakhtunkhwa, Pakistan
- Website: www.wus.edu.pk

Women University Swabi is a public university situated in Swabi, Khyber Pakhtunkhwa, Pakistan. The university is run by the provincial government and was founded in 2016.

== Departments and faculties ==
The university currently has the following departments.

- Department of Food Science and Nutrition
- Department of Public Health and Epidemiology
- Department of Microbiology & Molecular Biology
- Department of Health Informatics
- Department of Diagnostic Medical Sonography
- Department of Clinical Laboratory Sciences
- Department of Art, Design & Cultural Studies
- Department of Botany
- Department of Zoology
- Department of Chemistry
- Department of English language & literature
- Department of Economics
- Department of Islamic Studies
- Department of Political Science
- Department of Psychology
- Department of Pakistan Studies
- Department of Urdu
- Department of Computer Science
- Department of Statistics
- Department of Mathematics
- Department of Law
- Department of Physics
- Department of Social Work
- IT Section

== See also ==
- Ghulam Ishaq Khan Institute of Engineering Sciences and Technology
- University of Swabi
- Women University Mardan
- Shaheed Benazir Bhutto Women University, Peshawar
- Government Post Graduate College (Swabi)
