= Kalu Khan =

Kalu Khan کالوخان
- Town
- Flag

- Location within Pakistan
- Coordinates: 34°13′0″N 72°18′0″E
- Country: Pakistan
- Province: Khyber-Pakhtunkhwa
- District: Razzar, Swabi District
- Elevation: 317 m (1,040 ft)

Population
  - Total: 39,432

Kalu Khan is a village located between Shawwa-Adda and Adina village on the main Mardan–Swabi road in Khyber–Pakhtunkhwa province of Pakistan.

The people of the area belong to the Mandanr-Yousafzai (Isapzai in Pashto) branch of Afghans through mythical confederation patriarch Mand and his sons. The village is eponymous to the 16th century ruling chief of the region, Kalu Khan Yousafzai, an Afghan warrior who annihilated 8,000-50,000 troops of Emperor Akbar at the Karakar Pass in 1586 during the Afghan-Mughal wars, one of the greatest Mughal defeats in history.

Kalu Khan was upgraded to the status of Tehsil Headquarters of District Swabi during the ANP (Awami National Party/ملي اولسي ګوند) government term in the province between 2008 and 2013.

It is located at 34°13'0N 72°18'0E with an altitude of 317 meters (1043 feet).
