= Kotha, Khyber Pakhtunkhwa =

Coordinates: 34°4′0″N 72°35′0″E

Kotha is a town and Union Council of Swabi District in the Khyber Pukhtoonkhwa of Pakistan. It is located at 34°4'0N 72°35'0E with an altitude of 335 metres (1102 feet).

Kotha has three union councils, a government degree college and another degree college for women under construction. Literacy rate is 90%.

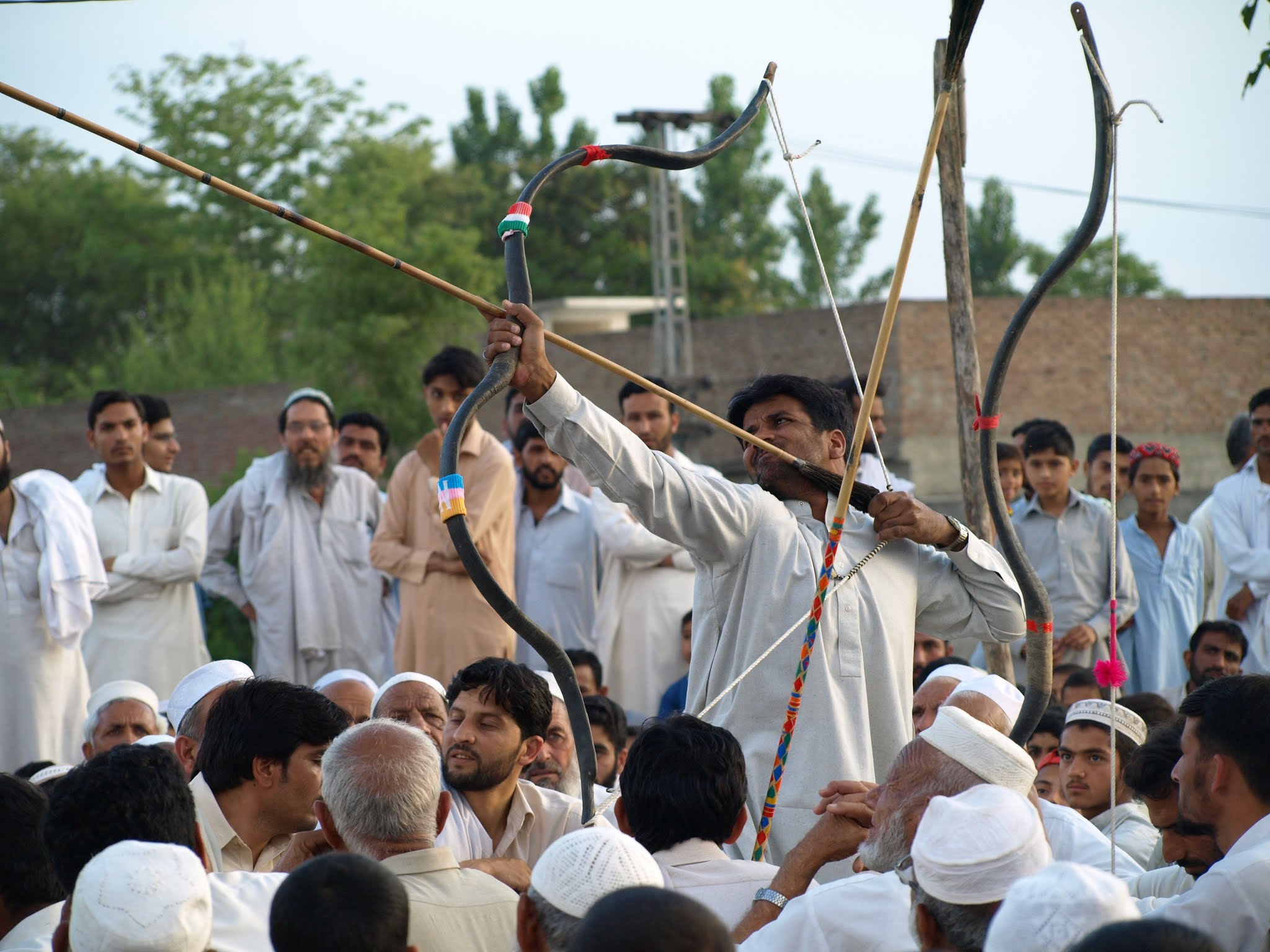
Men playing the sport of Makha in Kotha.
