= Kalabat =

Coordinates: 34°4′0″N 72°33′0″E

Kalabat is a town and Union Council in the Swabi District of Khyber Pakhtunkhwa, Pakistan. It is located at 34°4'0 N 72°33'0 E with an altitude of 325 metres (1,069 feet).

Kalabat has its own union council. Despite being a small town has every modern-day facilities, such as 24/7 transport, telephones , internet, banks, police station, a hospital, and schools. The main source of income here is farming. The literacy rate here is rather high.

== Notable people ==
- farukh Siar Bombekheil
- Kachkol khan
- Sharif khan
- Zarif khan
- Najeem khan
- Juma khan
- Jalil khan
