= Damghar =

Village in Swat, Pakistan

Coordinates: 34°48′07.8″N 72°21′25.2″E

Damghar Yousafzai is a village in the Swat District of Khyber Pakhtunkhwa, Pakistan. It is located adjacent to the Swat River.
