= Shewa, Khyber Pakhtunkhwa =

Shewa شیوہ شېوا
- Village
- Location in Swabi khyber Pakhtunkhwa Pakistan
- Coordinates: 34°14′0″N 72°21′0″E
- Country: Pakistan
- Khyber Pakhtunkhwa: Khyber Pakhtunkhwa
- District: Swabi District
- Tehsil: Shewa Tehsil
- Time zone: UTC+5 (Karachi Pakistan PST)
  - Summer (DST): +6

Shewa is a village and Union Council of Swabi District in the Khyber Pakhtunkhwa of Pakistan. It is located at 34°14'0N 72°21'0E with an altitude of 340 metres

== Overview ==
Shewa is the largest old and historic village in Swabi District with a total population of over 40,000. Shewa village is located 5 km north of Mardan Swabi Road. Most people are farmers. Tobacco, Maize and Wheat are major crops. Potatoes and peas are also grown.

There has been a traditional Jargha in Shewa village since ancient times.

Shewa Educated Social Workers Association (SESWA) is aiding in the development of the village.

At the government level, there are one degree college, two high schools, two middle schools and more than two dozen primary schools.

There is a RHC hospital and a dispensary, as well as a private clinic.

Bull races are held on a regular basis.
