= Adina, Khyber Pakhtunkhwa =

Adina
- Town and union council
- Location in Pakistan
- Coordinates: 34°13′20″N 72°16′10″E
- Country: Pakistan
- Region: Khyber Pakhtunkhwa
- District: Swabi District

Population (22000)
  - Town and union council: 22,000
  - Urban: no
- Time zone: UTC+5 (PST)

Adina is a town and union council of Swabi District in Khyber Pakhtunkhwa. Adina received its name from Punjabi warlord Adina Beg Khan, who expelled Durrani forces from Punjab in the Battle of Manupur and Battle of Mahilpur. It is located at an altitude of 303 metres (997 feet).
