= Lahor Tehsil =

Lahor Tehsil تحصیل لاہور لاهور تحصیل
- Tehsil
- Country: Pakistan
- Province: Khyber Pakhtunkhwa
- District: Swabi
- Seat: Chhota Lahore

Government
  - Nazim: Adil Khan (PML(N))
  - Naib Nazim: Not Selected yet.

Population (2017)
  - Tehsil: 306,168
  - Urban: 41,420
  - Rural: 264,748
- Time zone: UTC+5 (PST)
- Number of towns: 1
- Number of Union Councils: 17

Lahor is a tehsil located in Swabi, Khyber Pakhtunkhwa, Pakistan. The town of Lahor is the headquarters of the tehsil.

== Administration ==
Lahor Tehsil is administratively subdivided into 17 Union Councils. The tehsil boundaries touch the districts of Nowshera, Attock and Swabi Tehsil. The village of Lahor itself has two Union Councils, Lahor Gharbi and Lahor Shirqi (East and West).
