= Batakara =

Town in Swabi District, Pakistan

Coordinates: 34°2′0″N 72°36′0″E

Batakara is a town and Union Council of Swabi District in Khyber Pakhtunkhwa province of Pakistan. It is located at 34°2'0N 72°36'0E with an altitude of 323 metres (1062 feet).

The city was known as Bee-rai around four or five centuries ago. There once were British residents in the town, and it has also been home to various tribes. Later the name was changed from Bee-rai to Batakara. It is near the Tarbela Dam on the Indus River, as well as desert and many green farms. Batakara was once renowned for fishing, and the special fish malah was known throughout the region.

The language of the local people is Pashto. Farming is the occupation of these people, primarily cultivating sugarcane, maize, and wheat. Mukkha, a game similar to Archery, is traditionally played here.
