= Dagai, Swabi =

Dagai
- Town and union council
- Location in Pakistan
- Coordinates: 34.1675°N 72.3055°E
- Country: Pakistan
- Province: Khyber Pakhtunkhwa
- District: Swabi District
- Time zone: UTC+5 (PST)
- Postal code: 23340

Dagai is a village and Union Council of Tehsil Razzar and Swabi District in Khyber Pakhtunkhwa province of Pakistan.

Dagai, known from outside as Yarhussain Dagai, is located 5 km south of Shewa Adda, the main commercial area of the region, and 2 km east of Yarhussain. It is one of the largest villages in Swabi district. According to the census of 1998 (Pakistan), its population was over 16000. It lies in the most southern part of Swabi, with Dandoka to its north, Yarhussain to its west, Maneri to its east and Urmal Dheri to its south.

== Facilities ==
Dagai has one Regional Health Center (RHC), currently under construction, one post office, one higher secondary school and many schools for girls, as well as two government high schools for boys. There is one HBL Branch and one utility store in Dagai. In 2012, a cricket academy (Junaid Khan Cricket Academy) was opened for the boys to train and produce new cricket players.

== Living ==
The majority of the people are associated with agriculture for their direct and indirect income. The area is rich in growing vegetable crops, crops such as wheat, maize, sugarcane and rice, and cash crops such as tobacco. Other common occupations are teaching, businesses, freelancers, skilled workers and public services covering almost all sectors of life from health to finance. The overseas job market is considered attractive for both highly educated skilled individuals as well as for unskilled masses and to date remains the major revenue source for the area. Major destinations for work are countries like Saudi Arabia, UAE, Oman, and other Gulf countries. The people are very warm-hearted and hospitable. The society also participates in social events actively. The weddings are celebrated almost three days long with traditional dishes and sweets with a large number of attendees. Likewise, the death is mourned together with praying for the lost one. Eid is the biggest occasion of the year, twice after Ramadan and the day following the Hajj. People usually visit each other and share food and greetings to relatives, neighbors and the poor. There is no other notable fest or celebration around the year.

== Demographics ==
The people of Dagai mostly belong to the Yousafzai tribe of Pukhtoons and Awan tribe of Arab.

=== Notable people ===
- Zarin Gull (1933 - 1996), Pakistani politician
- Fazal Dad Khan (1929–1999), Pakistani politician
- Hamdullah Jan (1914-2019), Pakistani Islamic scholar
- Said Gul Awan (1820-1890),Indian British Army

== Suburbs ==
Suburbs include Sikandarai, Bachai, Sapruna, Shumlo, Kaday, Rashaka, Mathra, Mohib Banda, Khamacha, Khair Abad, Badraga, Shukaa, Saro Wand, Sadray, Alla Dad Khel and Hamza Khel. Junakhel is the largest mohalla in Dagai.
