= Naranji =

Coordinates: 34°19′0″N 72°25′0″E

Naranji is a town and Union Council of Swabi District in NWFP. It is located at 34°19'0N 72°25'0E with an altitude of 537 metres (1765 feet).its population is about 26228
