= Chak Noda =

Town in Khyber Pakhtunkhwa, Pakistan

Chak Noda (Chak Naudeh) is a town and Union Council of Swabi District in Khyber-Pakhtunkhwa belonging to the Mahmudzai subdivision of Razzar in Tehsil Razzar Swabi.
