= Parmoli =

- Village
- Country: Pakistan
- Province: Khyber Pakhtunkhwa
- District: Swabi = Tehsil Razzar

Parmoli is a village and Union Council of Swabi District in Khyber Pakhtunkhwa, Pakistan.

Parmoli is situated in the northwest of Swabi city. It is one of the largest union councils of Razar Tehsil district in Swabi. Shewa, Ghulama, Narangi, Ali Abad, Khesha and Mehr Ali are its neighbour villages. Parmoli grand canal also passes through it which come from swat. There is one large high school for males and one for females, as well as five primary schools for males and three for females.
