= Gajju Khan Medical College =

Medical College in Khyber Pakhtunkhwa, Pakistan

- گجو خان طبی کالج
- Type: Public Sector
- Established: 2014; 12 years ago
- Affiliations: PMDC; KMU
- Location: Swabi, Pakistan; 34.08092°N 72.45506°E
- Website: gkmcs.edu.pk

Gajju Khan Medical College (Urdu: گجو خان طبی کالج, Pashto: د ګجو خان طب پوهنځی) is a public medical institution located in Swabi District, Khyber Pakhtunkhwa, Pakistan. The college is named after the 16th-century Pashtun revolutionary leader, Gaju Khan Baba.

== Departments ==
There are 23 departments in the Gajju Khan Medical College. These include:

=== Basic sciences ===
- Department of Anatomy
- Department of Bio-Chemistry
- Department of Community Medicine
- Department of Forensic Medicine
- Department of Pathology
- Department of Pharmacology
- Department of Physiology

=== Clinical sciences ===
- Department of Cardiology
- Department of Dermatology
- Department of ENT
- Department of Gynecology
- Department of Medicine
- Department of Ophthalmology
- Department of Orthopedics
- Department of Pediatrics
- Department of Pediatrics surgery
- Department of Plastic Surgery
- Department of Psychiatry
- Department of Pulmonology
- Department of Radiology
- Department of Surgery
- Department of Urology
- Department of NeuroSurgery
