= Tordher =

Coordinates: 33.991°N 72.288°E

Tordher (Swabi District) Tordher (Pashto: توردھر) is a prominent commercial town and a union council located in the Swabi District of the Khyber Pakhtunkhwa province in Pakistan. It is situated on the northern bank of the Kabul River, near its confluence with the Indus River.

== Geography ==
Tordher is located in the fertile alluvial plains of the Swabi District. Its geographic location is strategically significant due to its proximity to two major rivers: the Kabul and the Indo. The land is exceptionally fertile, making it a hub for large-scale agriculture.

== Economy and agriculture ==
The town serves as the second-largest commercial center in the Swabi District. Its economy is driven by two main pillars:

- Agriculture – The surrounding fields (spanning thousands of hectares) are famous for producing high-quality tobacco, wheat, and sugarcane.
- Trade – The Tordher Bazaar is a historic and bustling marketplace that acts as a central trading hub for dozens of surrounding villages. Devided into sub-bazars like saadar bazar, chok bazar, purana bazar, senii bazar and subzi mandai. Newly made Islamabad market is also becoming a major bazar in Tordher.

== Global connection and diaspora ==
One of the most unique aspects of Tordher is its significant diaspora. A large portion of the population has migrated abroad for work, with a particularly high concentration of residents living in Italy, especially in Rome. The remittances sent back by the community in Italy have significantly transformed the local economy, leading to the construction of modern housing, improved infrastructure, and private schools.

== Culture ==
The inhabitants of Tordher are predominantly Pashtuns, and the primary language spoken is Pashto. Traditions: The community strictly follows the Pashtunwali code of conduct, which emphasizes hospitality (Melmastia), bravery, and honor. Religion: The population is almost entirely Muslim, and the town is home to several historic and modern mosques.

== Education ==
Tordher is a regional center for learning. It hosts several key educational institutions that include a Government Degree College as well as private and public high schools that serve students from the entire sub-division.

== Infrastructure ==
The town is well-connected by road to the district headquarters of Swabi and the nearby city of Jahangira. Its proximity to the rivers also makes it a point of interest for local fishing and irrigation projects.

== Demographics ==
Historical population
Year	Pop.	±% p.a.
1951	...	—
1961	...	—
1972	...	—
1981	...	—
1998	27,861	—
2017	41,420	+2.11%
2023	46,320	+1.88%

As of the 2023 census, Tordher had a population of 46,320.

== See also ==
- List of cities in Khyber Pakhtunkhwa by population
- Swabi Tehsil
- Topi
- Zaida
