= Marghuz =

Coordinates: 34°4′6″N 72°31′56″E

Marghuz Village is a manor and Union Council of the Swabi District, Khyber Pakhtunkhwa, Pakistan. It is located in Swabi between Kalabat and Thandkoi and is famous for its education. People of Marghuz are well known for their love of education and have a relatively higher percentage of educated individuals. Akakhel and Yarakhel Subtribes of Mandanr Yousafzai Afghans reside in the village. Akakhel is further divided into Sultukhel, Qamral, Orhyakhel and Mamakhel tribes while Yarakhel is further divided into Baralkhel, khidadkhel and Aladkhel tribes. <

It is not correct that the residents of village Marghuz belong to Yussfzai tribe. Different families of village Marghuz have migrated from different areas of KPK the then NWFP even a tribe known as Malakhel have migrated from India. Malakhel are Muhajir Behar province of India. Similarly, Allah dad khel have migrated from Khyber. They are known as Alladad khel because they belonged to the tribe Alladad in Khyber Agency. Khaudadkhel have from village Shah Mansoor in District Swabi while Balarkhel have migrated from village Salim khan. A tribe from Balarkhel known as Gadaikhel have migrated from Kabul Afghanistan. In Marghuz Akakhel Oriakhel and Sarikh lore tribes are also from Khyber Agency. All these tribes have settled in village some 90 to 95 years. They came seized the lands that were originally the property of Syed Family. https://search.worldcat.org/title/021335327>

<Notables> -Dr.Ashfaq Ahmed Khan(Paediatrician and former Principal of KMC)

-Asad Qaiser(Former Speaker of the National Assembly)
