= Ismaila =

Coordinates: 34°13′0″N 72°15′0″E

Ismaila' is a town and Union Council of Swabi District in the Khyber-Pakhtunkhwa province of Pakistan. It is located at 34°13'0N 72°15'0E

Its population is about 60,000.. Ismaila falls in the outer periphery of Swabi District bordering Mardan District.
