= Swabi =

Swabi: صوابۍ
- City
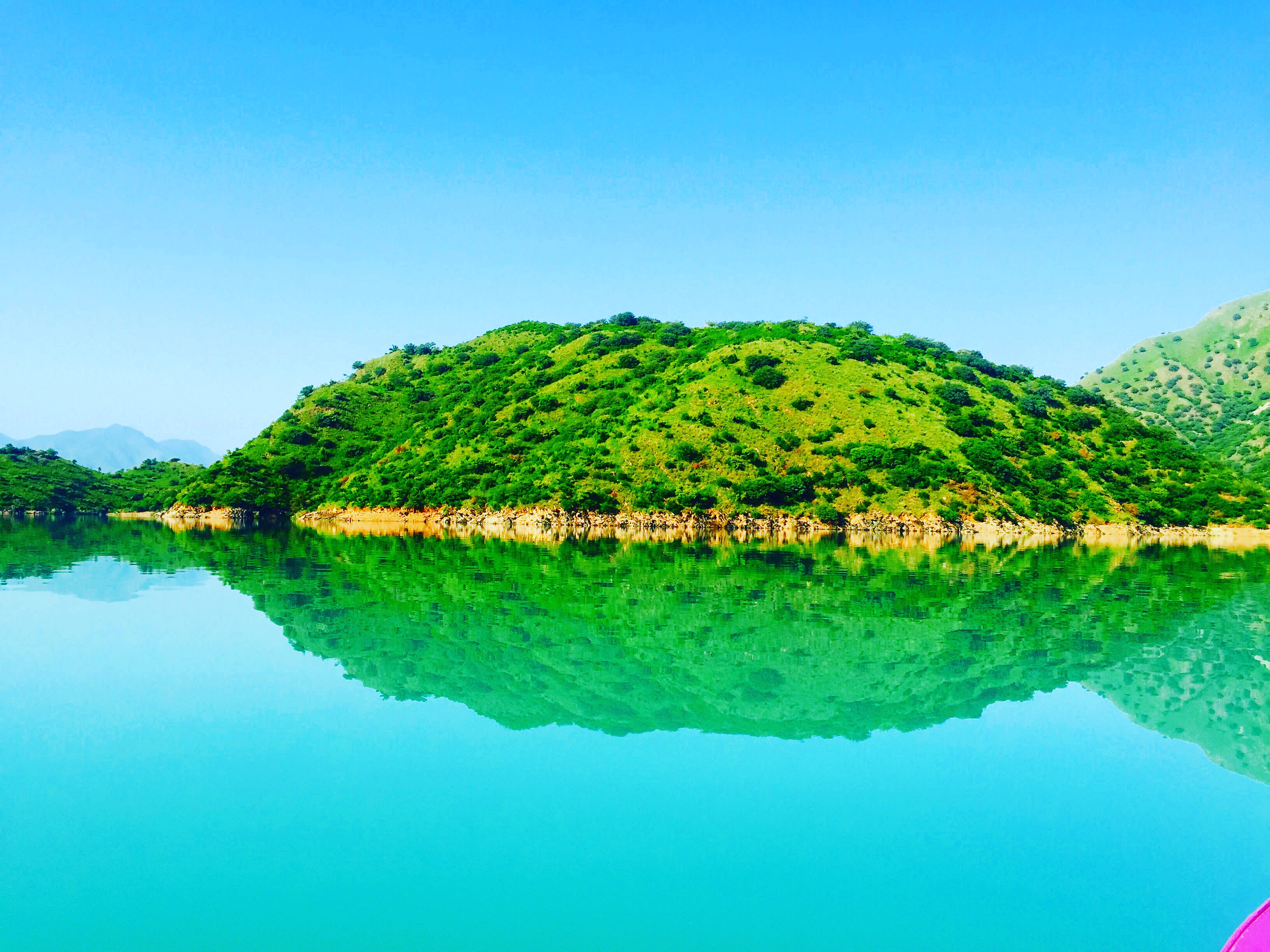

- Location within Khyber Pakhtunkhwa Location within Pakistan
- Coordinates: 34°7′12.5580″N 72°28′12.5544″E
- Country: Pakistan
- Province: Khyber Pakhtunkhwa
- District: Swabi
- Tehsil: Swabi

Government
  - Type: Tehsil Municipal Administration
  - TMO: Vacant
- Elevation: 340 m (1,120 ft)

Population (2023)
  - City: 156,496
  - Rank: 72nd in Pakistan; 7th in Khyber Pakhtunkhwa
- Time zone: UTC+5 (PST)
- Calling code: +92 938

Swabi (Pashto: صوابۍ; Urdu: صوابی) is a city in the Khyber Pakhtunkhwa province of Pakistan. It is located near the bank of the Indus River. It is the 72nd largest city of Pakistan and Seventh largest in the province in Khyber Pakhtunkhwa. Swabi is also a major city in the Mardan Division, where it is the second-largest city.

== Demographics ==
=== Population ===
Historical Population
Year	Pop.	±% p.a.
1961	17,542	—
1972	37,292	+7.10%
1981	46,344	+2.44%
1998	80,157	+3.28%
2017	123,412	+2.30%
2023	156,496	+4.04%

According to the 2023 Census of Pakistan, the city of Swabi had 1,894,600 inhabitants, making it the eighth-largest city in Khyber Pakhtunkhwa. These inhabitants were distributed across 16,212 households, for an average household size of 7.61 in Swabi. Swabi experienced quick growth throughout the latter half of the twentieth century, with its population nearly quintupling over a mere 40 years. However, this growth trajectory has gradually decelerated over time. Between 1998 and 2017, the city's population exhibited an increase of only 2.29% annually. The residents historically are of the Yusufzai tribe of Pashtuns which are predominant in the area.

Languages

Languages of Swabi MC (2023 Census)
1. Pashto (99.6%)
2. Others (0.40%)

== Climate ==
Swabi has a warm and temperate climate. With hot and humid summers and mild winters, Swabi features a humid subtropical climate (Köppen Cwa). The average temperature in Swabi is 22.2 °C, while the annual precipitation averages 639 mm. November is the driest month with an average rainfall of 12 mm, while August is the wettest month with an average of 137 mm of precipitation.

June is the hottest month of the year, with an average temperature of 32.9 °C. January is the coldest month, with an average temperature of 10.2 °C.

Climate data for Swabi
Month	Jan	Feb	Mar	Apr	May	Jun	Jul	Aug	Sep	Oct	Nov	Dec	Year
Mean daily maximum °C (°F)	17.7 (63.9)	19.0 (66.2)	24.0 (75.2)	30.1 (86.2)	36.3 (97.3)	41.4 (106.5)	38.5 (101.3)	36.5 (97.7)	35.3 (95.5)	31.6 (88.9)	25.1 (77.2)	19.4 (66.9)	29.6 (85.2)
Daily mean °C (°F)	10.2 (50.4)	12.7 (54.9)	17.5 (63.5)	22.7 (72.9)	28.0 (82.4)	32.9 (91.2)	31.8 (89.2)	30.4 (86.7)	28.4 (83.1)	23.4 (74.1)	16.9 (62.4)	11.7 (53.1)	22.2 (72.0)
Mean daily minimum °C (°F)	2.3 (36.1)	5.5 (41.9)	10.4 (50.7)	15.3 (59.5)	20.2 (68.4)	25.1 (77.2)	26.2 (79.2)	25.5 (77.9)	22.3 (72.1)	14.9 (58.8)	7.4 (45.3)	2.7 (36.9)	14.8 (58.7)
Average precipitation mm (inches)	55 (2.2)	58 (2.3)	69 (2.7)	47 (1.9)	23 (0.9)	25 (1.0)	110 (4.3)	137 (5.4)	58 (2.3)	14 (0.6)	12 (0.5)	31 (1.2)	639 (25.3)
Source: Climate-Data.org

== Education ==
Following are some of the notable educational institutes in Swabi:

- Ghulam Ishaq Khan Institute of Engineering Sciences and Technology
- University of Swabi
- Gajju Khan Medical College
- Women University Swabi
- Government Post Graduate College
- Government College of Technology Swabi

== Notable people ==
- Dawood Khan Yousafzai, Pakistani famous MMA World champion born in Swabi
- Mushtaq Ahmad Khan, Former Pakistani Senator and Leader of Jamaat-e-Islami (Pakistan), Leader of Save Gaza movement
- Asad Qaiser, Former Speaker of the National Assembly of Pakistan and Leader of Pakistan Tehreek-e-Insaf

== Visit ==
- Dobian
- Swabi District
- Swabi Tehsil
- Topi
- Tordher
- Zaida
