= Zaida, Khyber Pakhtunkhwa =

Town in Khyber Pakhtunkhwa, Pakistan

Zaida
- Union Council
- Interactive map of Zaida
- Coordinates: 34°03′35″N 72°28′0″E
- Country: Pakistan
- Province: Khyber Pakhtunkhwa
- District: Swabi
- Tehsil: Swabi

Population (2023)
  - Total: 34,200
- Time zone: UTC+5 (PST)

Zaida is a town and a union council in Swabi Tehsil of Swabi District in Khyber Pakhtunkhwa province of Pakistan. Zaida is located on the west bank of a stream of the Indus River, an area locally referred to as Badrai. As of 2011, the town is known for marble, agriculture and construction materials industry, and is considered a gateway between Punjab and Khyber Pakhtunkhwa.

== Demographics ==
=== Population ===
Historical population
Year	Pop.	±% p.a.
1951	...	—
1961	...	—
1972	...	—
1981	...	—
1998	22,656	—
2017	31,949	+1.83%
2023	34,200	+1.14%

As of the 2023 census, Zaida had a population of 34,200.
