= Shewa Adda =

Coordinates: 34°13′N 72°19′E

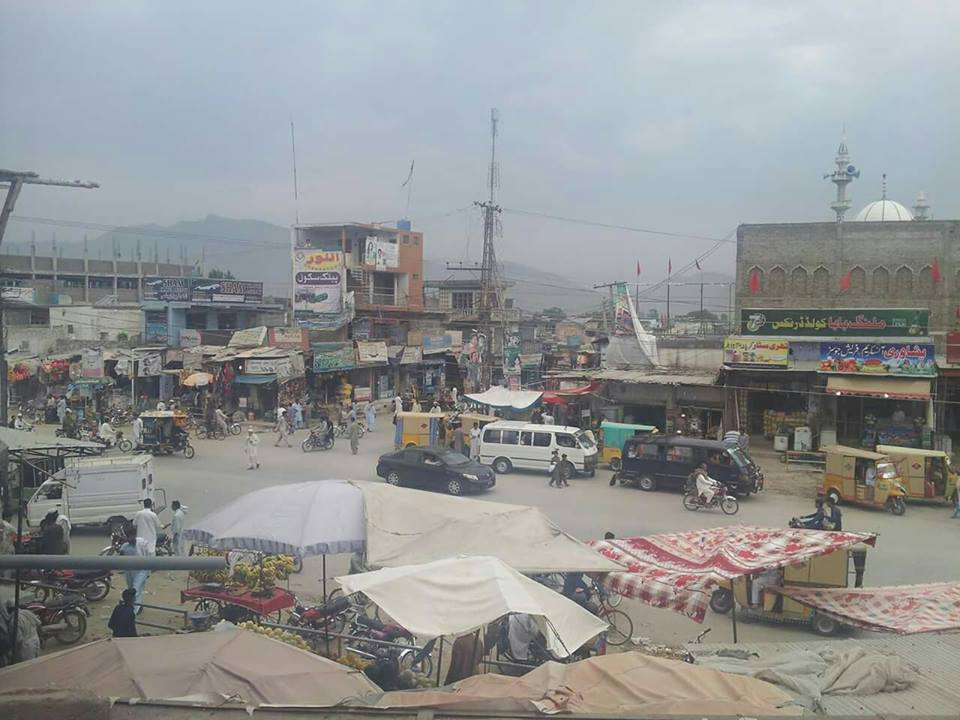
Shewa Adda, Khyber Pakhtunkhwa, Pakistan

Shewa Adda is the headquarter city of Razar Tehsil, Swabi District. This is also called Razzar City. The second largest furniture market in Mardan Division is situated here in this city. Shewa Adda is commercial trade center and busy markets place with an educational and technical schools, colleges and institutions hub along with quality medical centres facilities. The tombs of Sufi Syed Mian Kareem Shah Tirimzai and Kargil, Nishan e Haider hero Kernal Sher Khan are situated In front of each other at razzar's capital's oldest graveyard in Shewa Adda. It's the political hub of NA-19 and PK-47 politics also. Along with sports activism mainly night tournaments of cricket, volleyball, football, badminton etc., this city plays a vital role in promoting healthy activities.
