= Dobian =

Dobian دوبیان
- Union Council
- Location within Khyber Pakhtunkhwa Location within Pakistan
- Coordinates: 34°9′47″N 72°14′0″E
- Country: Pakistan
- Province: Khyber Pakhtunkhwa
- District: Swabi
- Tehsil: Razzar
- Time zone: UTC+5 (PST)
- Postal code: 23330
- Area code: +92 938

Dobian is an administrative unit, known as a union council of Swabi District in the Khyber Pakhtunkhwa province of Pakistan.
