= Swabi Tehsil =

Swabi Tehsil تحصیل صوابی صوابۍ تحصیل
- Tehsil
- Country: Pakistan
- Province: Khyber Pakhtunkhwa
- District: Swabi

Government
  - Tehsil Chairman: Atta Ullah Khan (PTI)
  - Assistant Commissioner: Allah Nawaz Khan

Population (2017)
  - Tehsil: 406,212
  - Urban: 155,361
  - Rural: 250,851
- Time zone: UTC+5 (PST)

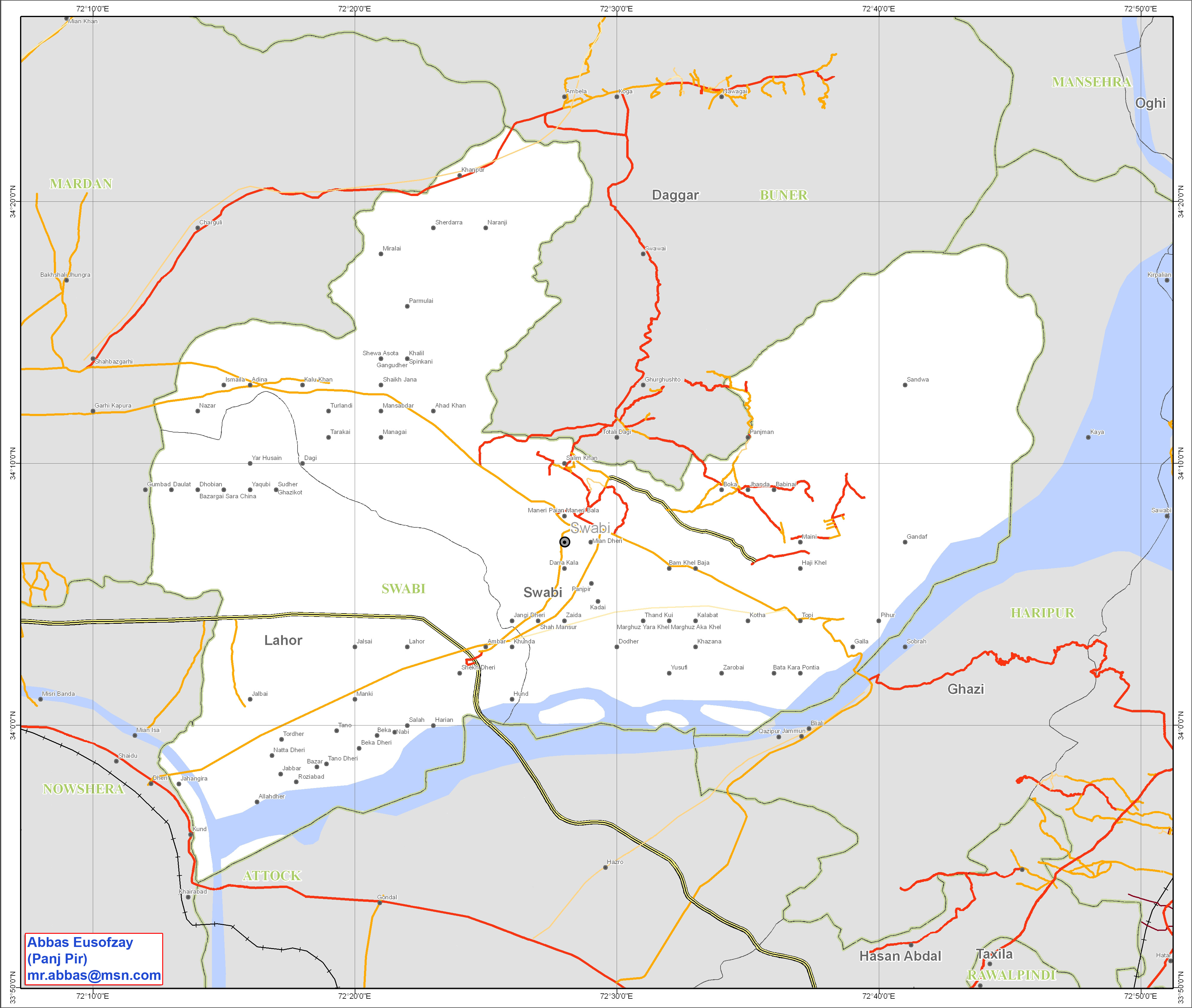
Map of district Swabi, located in kpk, Pakistan.

Swabi is a tehsil located in Swabi District, Khyber Pakhtunkhwa, Pakistan.

== Administration ==
Zaida Swabi is administratively subdivided into thirty nine Union Councils, namely:

Adina, Asota, Bachai, Bam Khel, Batakara, Chak Noda, Dagai, Gabasni, Gandaf, Gani Chatra, Gar Munara, Ismaila, Boko-Jhanda, Kabgant, Kalabat, Kalu Khan, Karnal Sher Killi, Kotha, Maini, Maneri Bala, Maneri Payan, Marghuz, Naranji, Pabeni, Panj Pir, Parmoli, Saleem Khan, Shahmansoor, Sheikh Jana, Shewa, Swabi, Swabi Maneri, Tarakai, Thand Kohi, Topi east, Topi west, Turlandi, Zaida, Zarobi.
