= Topi Tehsil =

Topi Tehsil تحصیل ٹوپی ټوپۍ تحصیل
- Tehsil
- Country: Pakistan
- Province: Khyber Pakhtunkhwa
- District: Swabi
- Capital: Topi

Government
  - Nazim: M Rahim Jadoon (JUI-F)
  - Naib Nazim: Muhammad Younas

Population (2017)
  - Tehsil: 328,300
  - Urban: 52,983
  - Rural: 275,317
- Time zone: UTC+5 (PST)
- Number of towns: 1
- Number of Union Councils: 11

Topi is one of the four tehsils of district Swabi in the Khyber Pakhtunkhwa province of Pakistan.

It is administratively subdivided into eleven Union Councils, including (1) Topi East, (2) Topi West, (3) Batakara, (4) Zarobai, (5) Kalabat, (6) Kotha, (7) Maini, (8) Gandaf, (9) Gani Chatra, (10) Gabasanai, (11) Kabganai

Tehsil Topi has 3 police stations namely (1) Topi Police Station Topi, (2) IDS Police Station Gadoon Industrial State, (3) Uthla Police station Utla Gadoon Amazai.

Tehsil Topi has Tarbela Dam's power Generation facility in the town of Topi called Right Bank.
