= Razar Tehsil =

Razzar Tehsil تحصیل رزار رزار تحصیل
- Tehsil
- Country: Pakistan
- Province: Khyber Pakhtunkhwa
- District: Swabi
- Headquarter: Karnal Sher Kallay

Government
  - Chairman: Ghulam Haqqani (ANP)

Population (2017)
  - Tehsil: 583,936
  - Urban: 26,161
  - Rural: 557,775
- Time zone: UTC+5 (PST)

Razzar is a tehsil located in Swabi District, Khyber Pakhtunkhwa, Pakistan. Its administrative seat is located in Shewa Adda near Kalu Khan. It consists of different villages and union councils, including, Sheikh Jana, Yaqubi, Yar Hussain, Sudhir, Sardcheena, Babo Dehri, Dobian, Kalukhan, Asota Sharif, Shewa, Kernal Sher Kallay (Naudeh), Adina, Ismaila, Turlandi, Naranji, and Farmoli. The villages of Dagai, Taraki and Rashaki are also part of Razzar Tehsil.
