= Lahor =

Pakistani town

- Location within Pakistan
- Coordinates: 34°2′54.5″N 72°21′56.1″E
- Country: Pakistan
- Province: Khyber-Pakhtunkhwa
- Tehsil: Lahor Tehsil
- Elevation: 308 m (1,010 ft)
- Time zone: UTC+5 (PST)
- Number of Union councils: 2

Lāhor, also known as Little Lahore (Pashto: وړوکی لاهور, Urdu: چھوٹا لاہور) and historically known as Salatura, is a town in the Swabi District of Khyber Pakhtunkhwa, Pakistan. It serves as the headquarters of the Lahor Tehsil and is administratively subdivided into two union councils. The town is located at 34°02′54″N 72°21′56″E with an altitude of 308 m. It lies west of Swabi on the northern bank of the Indus River. In the vicinity of Lahor are Panjpir, Hund and Zaida.

== Administration ==
The village of Lahor contains two union councils, Lahor Gharbi and Lahor Sharqi (East and West), each union is administered by its own nazim.

== History ==
Historians believe that a town called Śalātura existed in the vicinity of Lahor, where the Sanskrit grammarian Panini probably lived. The Chinese traveller Huan Tsang visited the city in the 7th century CE and reported that there was said to have been a statue for Panini in the town (but not present in his time). Alexander the Great is said to have passed through the area, in trying to cross the Indus River through the Hund.

== Bibliography ==
- Coward, Harold G., and K. Kunjunni Raja, Encyclopedia of Indian Philosophies: The Philosophy of the Grammarians, Princeton University Press, 1990.
- Daniélou, Alain, A Brief History of India, translated by Kenneth Hurry, Inner Traditions, 2003.
- Kulke, Hermann, and Dietmar Rothermund, A History of India, third edition, Routledge, 1998.
- MacDonell, Arthur A., A History of Sanskrit Literature, Motilal Banarsidass Publishers, 1900.
- A Sanskrit Grammar for Students, third edition, Oxford University Press, 1927.
- India's Past, Oxford University Press, 1927.
- Mohanty, J. N., Classical Indian Philosophy, Rowman & Little-field, 2000.
- Panini, Astadhyayi, translated by Sumitra M. Katre, University of Texas Press, 1987.
