= Swabi District =

Coordinates: 34°07′N 72°28′E

Swabi District ضلع صوابی صوابۍ ولسوالۍ
- District of Khyber Pakhtunkhwa
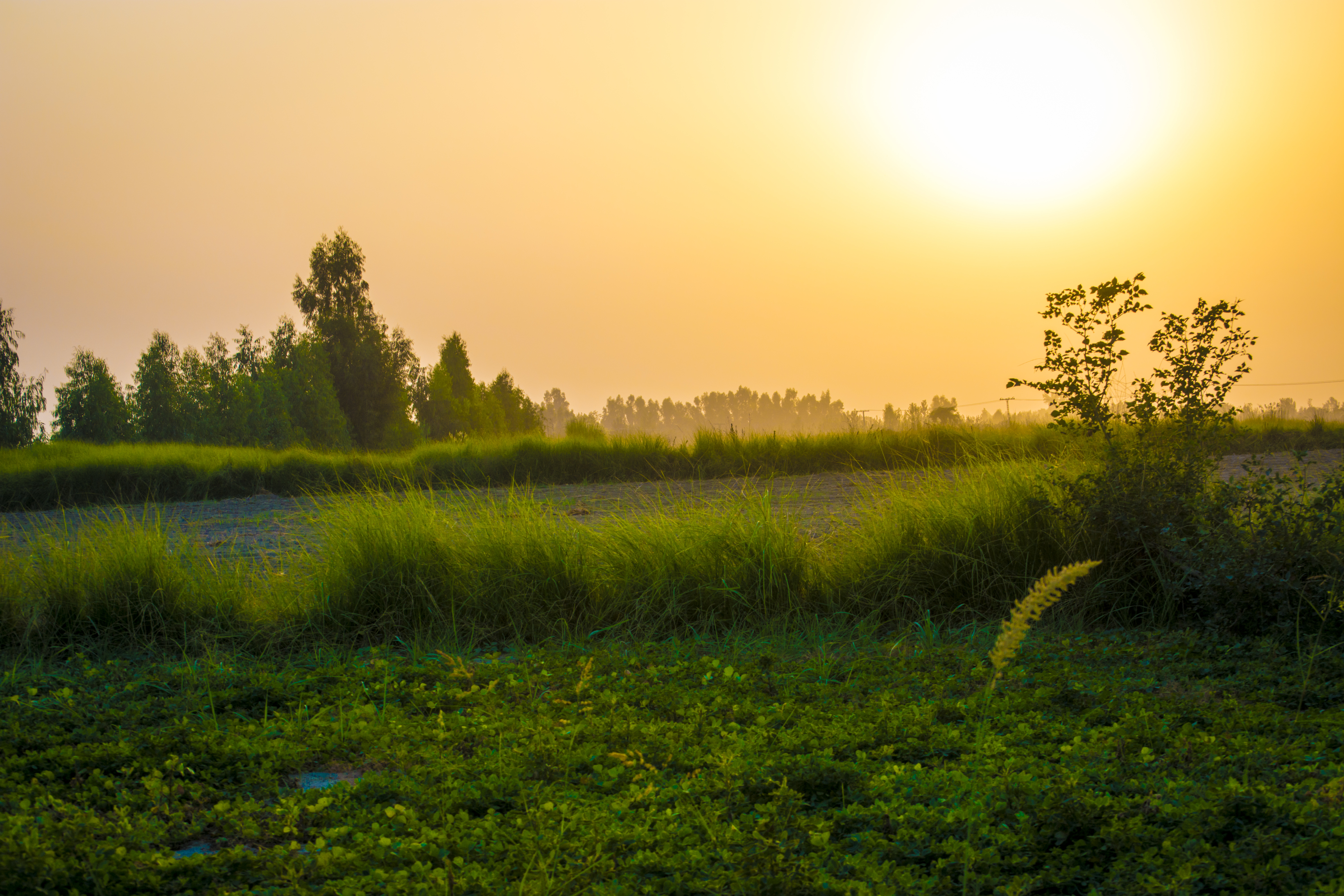
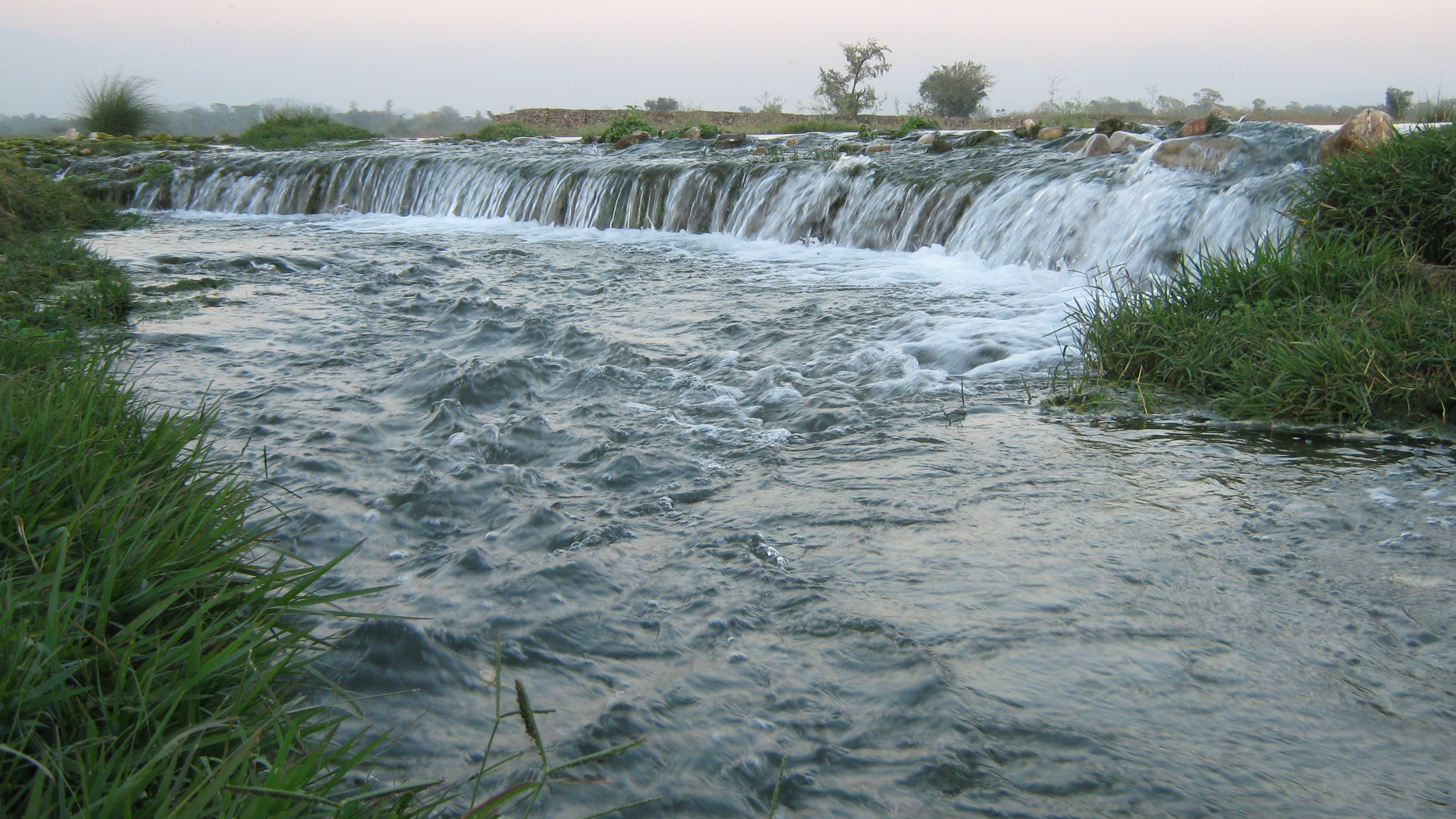
- Top: Sunset at Jalbai at Maini; Bottom: Kunal River

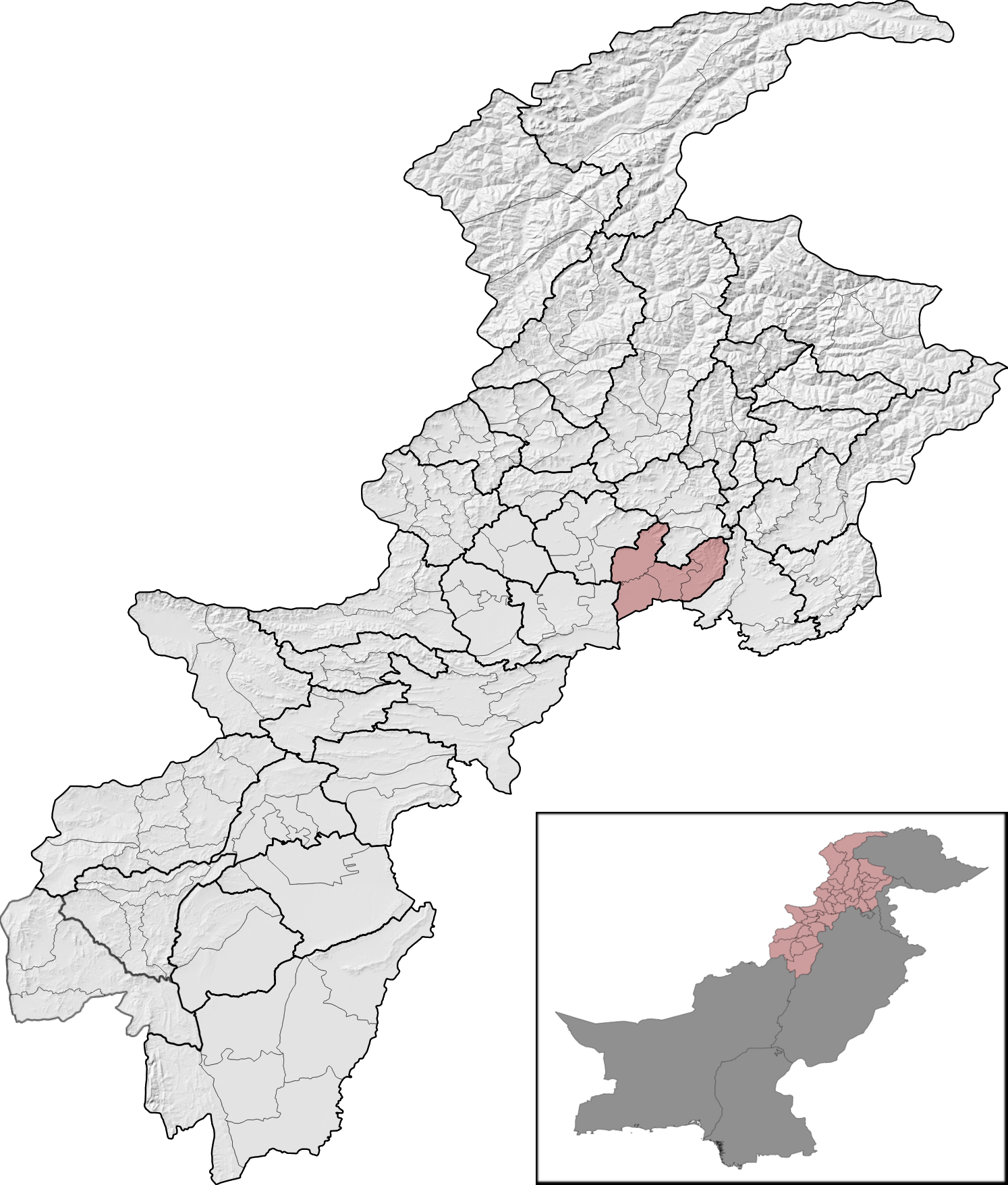
- Swabi District (red) in Khyber Pakhtunkhwa
- Country: Pakistan
- Province: Khyber Pakhtunkhwa
- Division: Mardan
- Headquarters: Swabi

Government
  - Type: District Administration
  - Deputy Commissioner: Nasr Ullah Khan
  - District Police Officer: Azhar Khan
  - District Health Officer: Dr Abdul Latif

Area
  - Total: 1,543 km^{2} (596 sq mi)

Population (2023)
  - Total: 1,894,600
  - Density: 1,228/km^{2} (3,180/sq mi)
  - Urban: 339,670 (17.93%)
  - Rural: 1,554,930 (82.07%)

Literacy
  - Literacy rate: Total: 58.48%; Male: 72.34%; Female: 44.50%
- Time zone: UTC+5 (PST)
- Number of Tehsils: 4
- Website: swabi.kp.gov.pk

Swabi District (Pashto: سوابۍ ولسوالۍ) is a district in the Mardan Division of the Khyber Pakhtunkhwa province in Pakistan. It lies between the Indus and Kabul Rivers. Before becoming a district in 1988, it was a tehsil within the Mardan District. 96% of the population speaks Pashto as their first language.

== Demographics ==
=== Population ===
Historical population
| Year | Pop. | ±% p.a. |
|---|---|---|
| 1951 | 272,279 | — |
| 1961 | 332,543 | +2.02% |
| 1972 | 507,631 | +3.92% |
| 1981 | 625,035 | +2.34% |
| 1998 | 1,026,804 | +2.96% |
| 2017 | 1,625,477 | +2.45% |
| 2023 | 1,894,600 | +2.59% |

As of the 2023 census, Swabi district has 278,976 households and a population of 1,894,600. The district has a sex ratio of 102.51 males to 100 females and a literacy rate of 58.48%: 72.34% for males and 44.50% for females. 519,863 (27.50% of the surveyed population) are under 10 years of age. 339,670 (17.93%) live in urban areas.

=== Ethnic groups ===
Yusufzai (Pashtun), Awan and Gujjars are main ethnic groups in the district.

=== Languages ===
Languages of Swabi district (2023)
1. Pashto (97.2%)
2. Hindko (2.05%)
3. Others (mainly Gujari, Kohistani) (0.72%)

At the time of the 2023 census, 97.23% of the population spoke Pashto and 2.05% Hindko as their first language. Other minority spoken languages are Gujari and Kohistani. As per 2023 estimates by Tablue Public in Swabi district Gujari along with Kohistani is spoken by 2.13% of the population.

=== Religion ===
Religion in contemporary Swabi District
| Religious group | 1941 | | 2017 | | 2023 | |
| Religious group | Pop. | % | Pop. | % | Pop. | % |
|---|---|---|---|---|---|---|
| Islam | 202,414 | 97.71% | 1,624,391 | 99.93% | 1,885,379 | 99.74% |
| Sikhism | 2,747 | 1.33% | —N/a | —N/a | 57 | ~0% |
| Hinduism | 1,968 | 0.95% | 88 | 0.01% | 80 | 0.01% |
| Christianity | 16 | 0.01% | 542 | 0.03% | 4,608 | 0.24% |
| Others | 10 | ~0% | 456 | 0.03% | 106 | 0.01% |
| Total Population | 207,155 | 100% | 1,625,477 | 100% | 1,890,230 (Note: Different from official population figure since it excludes sensitive areas where religion was not asked) | 100% |
Note: 1941 census data is for Swabi tehsil of erstwhile Mardan district, which roughly corresponds to contemporary Swabi district. District and tehsil borders have changed since 1941.

== Education ==
Swabi District is now home to many excellent educational institutes. But there was no public sector university until 2012. The only degree awarding institution then was private sector Ghulam Ishaq Khan Institute of Engineering Sciences and Technology, which was inaugurated in 1993. In 2012, the Government of Khyber Pakhtunkhawa established the first public sector university in Swabi, when it upgraded Abdul Wali Khan University Mardan Swabi campus into full-flege University of Swabi while Women University Swabi was established in 2016. Swabi district also has a public sector medical college Gajju Khan Medical College Swabi, which was established in 2014.

The district also has 2 public sector Postgraduate degree colleges: Government Postgraduate College Swabi and Govt Girls Post Graduate College Maneri Swabi.

== Administration ==
Swabi District is currently subdivided into four ehsils.

| Tehsil | Name (Urdu, Pashto) | Area (km²) | Pop. (2023) | Density (ppl/km²) (2023) | Literacy rate (2023) | Union Councils |
|---|---|---|---|---|---|---|
| Lahor Tehsil | (Urdu: تحصیل لاہور; Pashto: لاهور تحصیل) | 318 | 354,383 | 1,114.41 | 54.16% | |
| Razar Tehsil | (Urdu: تحصیل رزار; Pashto: رزار تحصیل) | 418 | 682,303 | 1,632.30 | 56.61% | |
| Swabi Tehsil | (Urdu: تحصیل صوابی; Pashto: سوابۍ تحصیل) | 389 | 475,352 | 1,221.98 | 63.23% | |
| Topi Tehsil | (Urdu: تحصیل ٹوپی; Pashto: ټوپۍ تحصیل) | 418 | 382,562 | 915.22 | 59.83% | |

=== Provincial Assembly ===
| Member of Provincial Assembly | Party affiliation | Constituency | Year |
|---|---|---|---|
| Rangez Ahmad | Pakistan Tehreek-e-Insaf | PK-49 Swabi-I | 2024 |
| Aqibullah Khan | Pakistan Tehreek-e-Insaf | PK-50 Swabi-II | 2024 |
| Abdul Karim Khan | Pakistan Tehreek-e-Insaf | PK-51 Swabi-III | 2024 |
| Faisal Khan Tarakai | Pakistan Tehreek-e-Insaf | PK-52 Swabi-IV | 2024 |
| Murtaza Khan Tarakai | Pakistan Tehreek-e-Insaf | PK-53 Swabi-V | 2024 |

== Newspaper in Swabi ==
Currently there are couple of newspaper publishing in Swabi under the supervision of the Swabi Group of Newspapers.

- Swabi Times, a weekly publishing newspaper in Urdu.
- Swabi News, a daily publishing newspaper in Urdu.

== Notable people ==
- Najib-ud-Daula, a combatant of Third Battle of Panipat
- Mir Azam, first-class cricketer of the Abbottabad team, also known as the falcons
- Haroon Bacha, Pashtun singer, musician, and composer
- Muhammad Fareed, Islamic scholar
- Ali Gohar, scholar and restorative justice expert and founder of Just Peace Initiatives
- Bushra Gohar, politician and Pashtun human rights activist
- Fazal Ali Haqqani, Minister of Education and member of the NWFP Assembly (then) now Khyber Pakhtunkhwa Assembly from 2002 to 2007
- Sardar Ali Haqqani, Islamic scholar
- Gulalai Ismail, Pashtun human rights activist
- Nigar Johar, the only female general in the history of the Pakistan Army
- Abdul Aziz Khan Kaka, Khudai Khidmatgar politician who defeated the Imperial Crown's political agent Sir Sahibzada Abdul Qayyum Khan in the elections of 1936
- Gaju Khan, an historic Pashtun rebel chief and general who fought in the rebellions of Sher Shah Suri
- Junaid Khan, cricketer
- Karnal Sher Khan, military officer
- Khan Roshan Khan, historian
- Meraj Hamayun Khan, Pashtun social worker and educationist
- Muhammad Arshad Khan, artist
- Muhammad Farooq Khan, Vice-Chancellor of Swat University
- Muhammad Ghufran Khan, politician and former Member of the Senate of Pakistan and Minister of Minerals and Mines of Khyber Pakhtunkhwa
- Mushtaq Ahmad Khan, member of the Senate of Pakistan
- Taskeen Manerwal, Pashto poet
- Abdul Qadir, founder of Pashto Academy at Peshawar University and ambassador in Kabul.
- Asad Qaiser, Speaker of National Assembly
- Sahibzada Abdul Qayyum, First Chief Minister of the North-West Frontier Province (in 1937) and founder of Islamia College University
- Mohammed Sadiq, political scientist, diplomat and Ambassador of Pakistan to Afghanistan
- Yasir Shah, cricketer
- Abdul Hadi Shahmansoori
- Shahram Khan Tarakai, former Provincial Minister of Khyber Pakhtunkhwa
- Usman Khan Tarakai, former Member of National Assembly who contested the 2008 Pakistani general election
- Kalu Khan Yousafzai, Afghan Warrior Chief who crushed the army of Akbar the Great of the Mughal Empire at the Karakar Pass
- Nisar Muhammad Yousafzai, Afghan Revolutionary War Hero of the Anglo-Afghan War of 1919 and a founding father of Tajikistan

== See also ==
- Districts of Pakistan
  - Districts of Khyber Pakhtunkhwa
  - Districts of Punjab, Pakistan
  - Districts of Balochistan, Pakistan
  - Districts of Sindh, Pakistan
  - Districts of Azad Kashmir
  - Districts of Gilgit-Baltistan
- Divisions of Pakistan
  - Divisions of Balochistan
  - Divisions of Khyber Pakhtunkhwa
  - Divisions of Punjab, Pakistan
  - Divisions of Sindh
  - Divisions of Azad Kashmir
  - Divisions of Gilgit-Baltistan

== Bibliography ==
- 1998 District Census report of Swabi. Census publication. Vol. 83. Islamabad: Population Census Organization, Statistics Division, Government of Pakistan. 2000.
