= Constituency WR-21 =

Reserved seat in a Pakistani provincial assembly

- Constituency for the Khyber Pakhtunkhwa Assembly

Current constituency
- Member: Khatoon Bibi

Constituency WR-21 is a reserved seat for women in the Khyber Pakhtunkhwa Assembly.

== See also ==
- Constituency PK-31 (Swabi-I)
- Constituency PK-32 (Swabi-II)
- Constituency PK-33 (Swabi-III)
- Constituency PK-34 (Swabi-IV)
- Constituency PK-35 (Swabi-V)
- Constituency PK-36 (Swabi-VI)
- Constituency WR-19
