= Faisal Khan Tarakai =

Pakistani politician

Provincial Minister of Labour Khyber Pakhtunkhwa
- Incumbent
- Assumed office 31 October 2025

Provincial Minister of Elementary & Secondary Education for Khyber Pakhtunkhwa
- In office 7 March 2024 – 30 September 2025
- Governor: Haji Ghulam Ali; Faisal Karim Kundi
- Chief Minister: Ali Amin Gandapur

Member of the Provincial Assembly of Khyber Pakhtunkhwa
- Incumbent
- Assumed office 29 February 2024
- Constituency: PK-52 Swabi-IV

Personal details
- Born: Swabi District, Khyber Pakhtunkhwa, Pakistan
- Party: PTI (2024-present)
- Relations: Shahram Khan Tarakai (brother); Mohammad Ali Tarakai (uncle); Usman Khan Tarakai (uncle); Murtaza Khan (cousin)
- Parent: Liaqat Khan Tarakai (father)

Faisal Khan Tarakai is a Pakistani politician from the Swabi District who is currently serving as the Minister of Elementary & Secondary Education for Khyber Pakhtunkhwa in the PTI-led Gandapur ministry. He is notably the brother of ex-minister Shahram Khan Tarakai and is currently serving as a member of the Provincial Assembly of Khyber Pakhtunkhwa from PK-52 Swabi-IV since February 2024.

== Early life and education ==
Faisal Khan Tarakai was born on 1 January 1979 in the Swabi District of Khyber Pakhtunkhwa. His father is Liaqat Khan Tarakai, while his family, the Tarakai family is an influential political family, including his brother ex-Minister Shahram Khan Tarakai. He received a Bachelor of Science in Marketing Management Degree and is also a businessman. He worked for several public welfare trusts owned by his family.

== Political career ==
=== Electoral history ===
He contested the 2024 Khyber Pakhtunkhwa provincial elections as a Pakistan Tehreek-e-Insaf-backed Independent candidate from PK-52 Swabi-IV. He secured 42,269 votes while the runner-up was Touseef Ijaz of ANP who secured 23,317 votes. Upon his victory, he was selected to be Minister of Elementary and Secondary Education of Khyber Pakhtunkhwa in the cabinet of Chief Minister Ali Amin Gandapur by Imran Khan.

=== Education Minister ===
While serving as Minister of Elementary and Secondary Education for Khyber Pakhtunkhwa he launched an enrollment drive for out-of-school kids. He claimed the first phase enrolled a record 119,900 children, while a target of 0.3 million had been set for the second phase which was launched in September 2024.

He claimed the provincial government was setting up 400 community schools to selected districts in Khyber Pakhtunkhwa under the Human Capital Investment Project. Faisal stated that over 26,000 boys and girls would be enrolled in these community schools while 500 early age classes would also be established in which a planned 32,000 more kids would be enrolled.

The government has also seen the beginning of e-transfer policy being used for teachers. The Khyber Pakhtunkhwa government also started a program to provide free meals to primary school students. According to an official communique, the Education Department launched several “pivotal” projects to provide educational infrastructure, leading to a significant increase in literacy.

A January 2025 report by The Express Tribune stated that the province's education system was “in doldrums” with millions of kids out of school working in child labor. Dr Muhammad Uzair, an assistant professor at the University of Peshawar stated that "The K-P Education Department has not achieved any significant education development goals in 2024. Teachers in elementary and secondary education were on the roads demanding promotions while classes were mostly boycotted."
