= Constituency PK-36 (Swabi-VI) =

- Former constituency for the Khyber Pakhtunkhwa Assembly

Former constituency
- Abolished: 2018

Constituency PK-36 (Swabi-VI) was a constituency for the Khyber Pakhtunkhwa Assembly of the Khyber Pakhtunkhwa province of Pakistan.

== See also ==
- Constituency PK-31 (Swabi-I)
- Constituency PK-32 (Swabi-II)
- Constituency PK-33 (Swabi-III)
- Constituency PK-34 (Swabi-IV)
- Constituency PK-35 (Swabi-V)
- Constituency WR-19
- Constituency WR-21
