= Usman Khan Tarakai =

Pakistani politician

- عثمان خان ترکئی
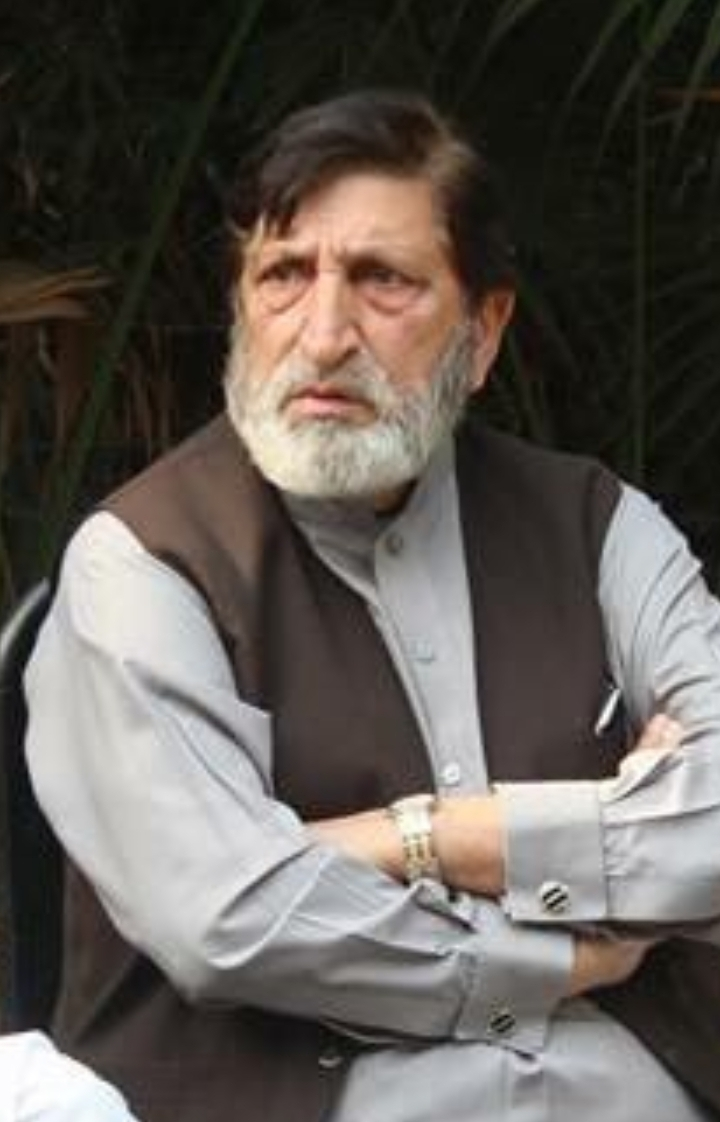

Member of the National Assembly of Pakistan
- In office 13 August 2018 – 20 January 2023
- Constituency: NA-19 (Swabi-II)
- In office 2008 – 31 May 2018
- Constituency: NA-12 (Swabi-I)

Personal details
- Born: 1 September 1947 (age 79) Swabi, Khyber Pakhtunkhwa, Pakistan
- Party: PART (2026-present)
- Other political affiliations: PTI (2015-2023); AJP (2012-2015); IND (2008-2012)
- Relatives: Liaqat Khan Tarakai (cousin); Mohammad Ali Tarkai (cousin); Shahram Khan Tarakai (nephew); Faisal Khan Tarakai (nephew)

Usman Khan Tarakai (Urdu: عثمان خان ترکئی; born 1 September 1947) is a Pakistani politician who had been a member of the National Assembly of Pakistan from the constituency NA-19 (Swabi-II) from August 2018 till January 2023. Previously, he was a member of the National Assembly from NA-12 Swabi-I from 2008 to May 2018.

== Early life ==
He was born on 1 September 1947 in the Swabi District, Khyber Pakhtunkhwa. He was from the Tarakai tribe of Ghilzai Pashtuns.

He worked as a technical advisor for Al Jazeera in Qatar before entering politics.

== Political career ==
Engr. Usman Tarakai was elected to the National Assembly of Pakistan as an independent candidate from Constituency NA-12 (Swabi-I) in the 2008 Pakistani general election. He received 49,872 votes and defeated Asfandyar Wali Khan of Awami National Party.

Tarakai was re-elected to the National Assembly as a candidate of Awami Jamhuri Ittehad Pakistan (AJIP) from Constituency NA-12 (Swabi-I) in the 2013 Pakistani general election. He received 56,680 votes and defeated a Haji Rahman Ullah of ANP.

In 2015, AJIP merged into Pakistan Tehreek-e-Insaf (PTI).

He was re-elected to the National Assembly as a candidate of PTI from Constituency NA-19 (Swabi-II) in the 2018 Pakistani general election. He received 83,903 votes and defeated Waris Khan, a joint candidate of ANP and other political parties.

On 18 May 2023, he left the PTI due to the 2023 Pakistani protests. Six days later, on 24 May 2023, he joined the Pakistan People's Party (PPP).

== See more ==
- Imran Khan
- Pakistan Tehreek-e-Insaf
- No-confidence motion against Imran Khan
- Pakistan
