= Mohammad Ali Tarakai =

Pakistani politician

MPA Mohammad Ali Tarakai

Member of the Khyber Pakhtunkhwa Assembly
- In office 13 August 2018 – 18 January 2023
- Constituency: PK-46 Swabi-IV
- In office 31 May 2013 – 29 May 2018
- Constituency: PK-33 (Swabi-III)

Parliamentary Secretary in Elementary & Secondary Education Department
- In office 3 September 2013 – 29 May 2018

Personal details
- Party: PTI (2015-present)
- Other political affiliations: AJP (2012-2015)
- Relatives: Usman Khan Tarakai (cousin); Liaqat Khan Tarakai (brother); Shahram Khan Tarakai (nephew); Faisal Khan Tarakai (nephew)
- Occupation: Politician

Mohammad Ali Tarakai (Urdu: محمد علی ترکئی) is a Pakistani politician from Swabi District who had been a member of the Khyber Pakhtunkhwa Assembly from August 2018 till January 2023 and belongs to the Pakistan Tehreek-e-Insaf. He won this constituency for the second time in a row in the 2018 provincial election.

== Political career ==
Ali was elected as the member of the Khyber Pakhtunkhwa Assembly on ticket of Awami Jamhuri Ittehad Pakistan (later merged to Pakistan Tehreek-e-Insaf) from PK-33 (Swabi-III) in the 2013 Pakistani general election.

Ali in the 2018 Pakistani general elections was re-elected on PTI's ticket from his own constituency PK-46 (Swabi-IV) defeating ANP Candidate Ayaz Ali.
