= Babar Saleem =

Pakistani politician

MPA Babar Saleem

Member of the Khyber Pakhtunkhwa Assembly
- In office 31 May 2013 – 28 May 2018
- Constituency: Constituency PK-31 (Swabi-I)

Personal details
- Born: January 5, 1983 (age 43) Swabi, Khyber Pakhtunkhwa, Pakistan
- Party: Pakistan Muslim League (N) (2018-present)
- Other political affiliations: Awami Jamhuri Ittehad Pakistan (2013-2015); Pakistan Tehreek-e-Insaf (2015-2018); Swabi Qaumi Mahaz (1994-2018)
- Occupation: Politician

Babar Saleem (born; 5 January 1983 Pashto: بابر سليم) is a Pakistani politician hailing from Swabi District, who was a member of the Khyber Pakhtunkhwa Assembly, belonging to the Pakistan Muslim League (N) (PMLN). He is the son of late Dr. Muhammad Saleem Khan, ex-Minister of health KPK. He also served as a committee chairman and member of different committees .

== Education ==
Babar Saleem has Bachelor of Computer Science and Master of Business Administration degrees.

== Political career ==
After the death of his father, Dr. Muhammad Saleem, in 2009, he took over as the chairman of Swabi Qaumi Mahaz.

Babar was elected as the member of the Provincial Assembly of Khyber Pakhtunkhwa from Constituency PK-31 (Swabi-I) in the 2013 Khyber Pakhtunkhwa provincial election on ticket of Awami Jamhuri Ittehad Pakistan (AJIP), which later merged into the Pakistan Tehreek-e-Insaf (PTI).

He was kicked out of the PTI due to horse-trading in the 2018 Pakistani Senate election. He later joined the Pakistan Muslim League (N) (PML(N)).

He ran for the Provincial Assembly from PK-44 Swabi-II as a candidate of the PML(N) in the 2018 Khyber Pakhtunkhwa provincial election, but was unsuccessful. He received 18,228 votes and was defeated by Asad Qaiser, a candidate of the PTI.
