= Murtaza Khan Tarakai =

Pakistani politician

Member of the Provincial Assembly of Khyber Pakhtunkhwa
- Incumbent
- Assumed office 29 February 2024
- Constituency: PK-53 Swabi-V

Personal details
- Born: Swabi District, Khyber Pakhtunkhwa, Pakistan
- Political party: PTI (2024-present)
- Relations: Liaqat Khan Tarakai (uncle); Shahram Khan Tarakai (cousin); Faisal Khan Tarakai (cousin)

Murtaza Khan Tarakai is a Pakistani politician from Swabi District. He is currently serving as member of the Provincial Assembly of Khyber Pakhtunkhwa since February 2024.

== Career ==
He contested the 2024 general elections as a Pakistan Tehreek-e-Insaf/Independent candidate from PK-53 Swabi-V. He secured 40,825 votes while the runner-up was Muhammad Zahid of ANP who secured 20,661 votes.The PK-53 Swabi-V consists of mainly Village Shewa which plays a main role in electing member of national assembly from swabi.
