= Kochian, Peshawar =

Kochian
- Village
- Kochian
- Interactive map of Kochian
- Country: Pakistan
- Province: Khyber Pakhtunkhwa
- District: District Peshawar
- Time zone: Pakistan Standard Time

Kochian is a village situated near the Warsak Dam. It falls within the territorial jurisdiction of District Peshawar, Khyber Pakhtunkhwa, Pakistan. Its coordinates are 34.130319°N 71.463200°E. It is one of the most beautiful and disciplined town in the locality. In this area Constellation public school is a private school providing education from nursery to 10th class. Other government schools also working providing primary and secondary education. Kochian hospital is there providing basic health facilities but need to be improved further.
