= NA-19 Swabi-I =

Constituency of the National Assembly of Pakistan

- Constituency for the National Assembly of Pakistan
- Region: Swabi, Topi Tehsils and Lahor Tehsil (partly) of Swabi District
- Electorate: 551,703

Current constituency
- Party: Pakistan Tehreek-e-Insaf
- Member: Asad Qaiser
- Created from: NA-18 Swabi-I

NA-19 Swabi-I (این اے-19، صوابی-۱) is a constituency for the National Assembly of Pakistan. The constituency was formerly known as NA-12 (Swabi-I) from 1977 to 2018. The name changed to NA-18 (Swabi-I) after the delimitation in 2018 and to NA-19 (Swabi-I) after the delimitation in 2022.

== Members of Parliament ==
=== 1977–2002: NA-12 Swabi-I ===
| Election | Member | Party |
|---|---|---|
| 1977 | Mohammed Iqbal Khan | PPP |
| 1985 | Malik Abdul Rauf | Independent |
| 1988 | Sardar Haji Gul Khitab Khan | IJI |
| 1990 | Javed Iqbal Abbasi | IJI |
| 1993 | Nawaz Sharif | PML-N |
| 1997 | Nawaz Sharif | PML-N |

=== 2002–2018: NA-12 Swabi-I ===
| Election | Member | Party |
|---|---|---|
| 2002 | Muhammad Usman | MMA |
| 2008 | Engineer Usman Khan Tarkai | Independent |
| 2013 | Engineer Usman Khan Tarkai | AJIP |

=== 2018–2023: NA-18 Swabi-I ===
| Election | Member | Party |
|---|---|---|
| 2018 | Asad Qaiser | PTI |

=== 2023–present: NA-19 Swabi-I ===
| Election | Member | Party |
|---|---|---|
| 2024 | Asad Qaiser | SIC |

== Elections since 2002 ==
=== 2002 general election ===
2002 General Election: NA-12 (Swabi-I)
| Party | Candidate | Votes | % | ±% |
|---|---|---|---|---|
| MMA | Muhammad Usman | 53,825 | 61.99 | |
| ANP | Shehryar Khan | 32,038 | 36.90 | |
| PML-Z | Khalid Jehangir | 967 | 1.11 | |
| Majority | | 21,787 | 25.09 | |
| Turnout | | 86,830 | 37.60 | |
| MMA gain from PML-N | | | | |

A total of 2,009 votes were rejected.

=== 2008 general election ===
2008 General Election: NA-12 (Swabi-I)
| Party | Candidate | Votes | % | ±% |
|---|---|---|---|---|
| Independent | Engineer Usman Khan Tarkai | 49,872 | 45.82 | |
| ANP | Asfandyar Wali Khan | 49,574 | 45.55 | +8.65 |
| PPPP | Umar Farooq Khan Shawa | 7,163 | 6.58 | |
| MMA | Said Mukhtar Ahmed | 1,462 | 1.34 | −60.65 |
| Pakistan Awami | Raziq Dad | 775 | 0.71 | |
| Majority | | 298 | 0.27 | |
| Turnout | | 108,846 | 39.26 | +1.66 |
| Independent gain from MMA | | | | |

A total of 3,041 votes were rejected.

=== 2013 general election ===
2013 General Election: NA-12 (Swabi-I)
| Party | Candidate | Votes | % | ±% |
|---|---|---|---|---|
| AJIP | Engineer Usman Khan Tarrakai | 56,680 | 37.18 | |
| ANP | Haji Rehmanullah | 37,437 | 24.55 | −21.00 |
| JUI-F | Ishfaq Ullah Khan | 21,651 | 14.20 | |
| PTI | Anwar Haqdad | 19,661 | 12.90 | |
| PML-N | Muhammad Israr | 7,227 | 4.74 | |
| PPPP | Ahmad Mustafa | 4,949 | 3.25 | −3.33 |
| JI | Mian Saleem Akbar | 2,166 | 1.42 | |
| Independent | Shah Faisal Khan | 852 | 0.56 | |
| APML | Khalid Ibrar | 394 | 0.26 | |
| Independent | Amanullah | 360 | 0.24 | |
| MDM | Abdul Hakam | 329 | 0.21 | |
| PkMAP | Murad Ali | 242 | 0.16 | |
| Pak Justice Party (Haqiqi) | Shahid Ahmad | 203 | 0.13 | |
| AWP | Khan Zada | 152 | 0.10 | |
| Independent | Said Mukhtiar Bacha | 152 | 0.10 | |
| Majority | | 19,243 | 12.63 | |
| Turnout | | 152,455 | 44.12 | +4.86 |
| AJIP gain from Independent | | | | |

A total of 4,094 votes were rejected.

=== 2018 general election ===
General elections were held on 25 July 2018.

General election 2018: NA-18 (Swabi-I)
| Party | Candidate | Votes | % | ±% |
|---|---|---|---|---|
| PTI | Asad Qaiser | 78,970 | 40.53 | ▲27.63 |
| MMA | Fazal Ali Haqqani | 34,217 | 17.56 | ▲1.73^{†} |
| ANP | Muhammad Islam Khan | 26,472 | 13.59 | ▼10.96 |
| PML(N) | Haji Sajjad Ahmed | 24,664 | 12.66 | ▲7.92 |
| Others | Others (nine candidates) | 23,220 | 11.92 | |
| Turnout | | 194,828 | 43.39 | ▼0.73 |
| Rejected ballots | | 7,285 | 3.74 | |
| Majority | | 44,753 | 22.97 | |
| Registered electors | | 449,012 | | |
| PTI gain from AJIP | | | | |

^{†}Change from combined vote of JUI-F, JI, and MDM in 2013

=== 2024 general election ===
General elections were held on 8 February 2024. Asad Qaiser won the election with 115,719 votes.

General election 2024: NA-19 Swabi-I
| Party | Candidate | Votes | % | ±% |
|---|---|---|---|---|
| PTI | Asad Qaiser (Note: Filed nomination papers as PTI candidate but ECP allowed him to run as an Independent) | 115,719 | 54.37 | ▲13.84 |
| JUI (F) | Fazal Ali Haqqani | 45,764 | 21.50 | N/A |
| ANP | Shahnawaz Khanzada | 24,226 | 11.38 | ▼2.21 |
| Others | Others (thirteen candidates) | 27,137 | 12.75 | |
| Turnout | | 221,010 | 40.06 | ▼3.33 |
| Rejected ballots | | 8,164 | 3.69 | |
| Majority | | 69,955 | 32.87 | ▲9.90 |
| Registered electors | | 551,691 | | |

== See also ==
- NA-18 Haripur
- NA-20 Swabi-II
