= Khatoon Bibi =

Pakistani politician

Khatoon Bibi MPA

Parliamentary Secretary in Health Department

Member of the Khyber Pakhtunkhwa Assembly
- Incumbent
- Assumed office 31 May 2013
- Constituency: WR-21

Personal details
- Party: Pakistan Tehreek-e-Insaf (PTI)
- Occupation: Politician

Khatoon Bibi (Urdu: خاتون بی بی) is a Pakistani woman politician hailing from Gharib Abad, Gohati, Swabi District, belong to Pakistan Tehreek-e-Insaf. Who is currently serving as Member of the Khyber Pakhtunkhwa Assembly. She is also serving as Parliamentary Secretary in Health Department.

== Political career ==
Khatoon Bibi was elected as the member of the Khyber Pakhtunkhwa Assembly on ticket of Awami Jamhuri Ittehad Pakistan (later merged to Pakistan Tehreek-e-Insaf) from Constituency WR-21 in the 2013 Pakistani general election on a seat reserved for women.
