= Asad Qaiser =

Pakistani politician (born 1969)

- اسد قیصر
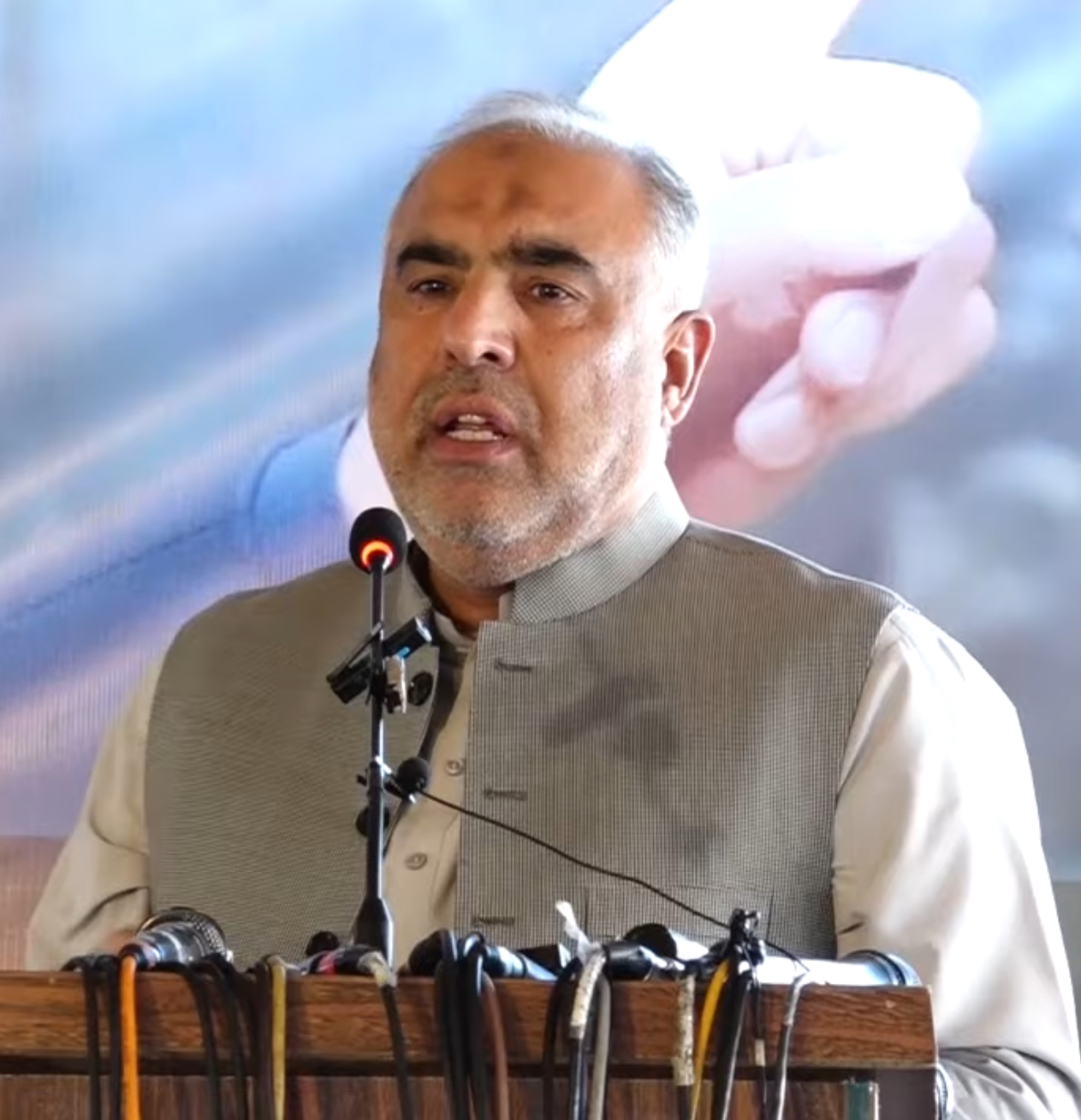
- Asad Qaiser in 2024

18th Speaker of the National Assembly of Pakistan
- In office 15 August 2018 – 10 April 2022
- Deputy: Qasim Suri
- Preceded by: Ayaz Sadiq
- Succeeded by: Raja Pervaiz Ashraf

Member of the National Assembly of Pakistan
- Incumbent
- Assumed office 29 February 2024
- Constituency: NA-19 Swabi-I
- In office 13 August 2018 – 17 January 2023
- Constituency: NA-18 (Swabi-I)

14th Speaker of Provincial Assembly of Khyber Pakhtunkhwa
- In office 30 May 2013 – 13 August 2018
- Deputy: Meher Taj Roghani
- Preceded by: Kiramat Ullah Khan
- Succeeded by: Mushtaq Ahmed Ghani

Member of the Provincial Assembly of Khyber Pakhtunkhwa
- In office 29 May 2013 – 28 May 2018
- Constituency: PK-35 (Swabi-V)

Personal details
- Born: 15 November 1969 (age 57) Marghuz, Khyber Pakhtunkhwa, Pakistan
- Party: PTI (1996-present)
- Relations: Aqibullah Khan (brother)
- Education: Government Post Graduate College, Swabi; University of Peshawar

Asad Qaiser (Urdu: اسد قیصر; born 15 November 1969) is a Pakistani politician from Swabi. He is the former Speaker of the National Assembly of Pakistan, served from August 2018 to April 2022. He has been a member of the National Assembly of Pakistan since February 2024, and previously served in this position from August 2018 to January 2023. Previously, he was the member of the Provincial Assembly of Khyber Pakhtunkhwa from 2013 to 2018 and served as the 14th Speaker of the Khyber Pakhtunkhwa Assembly, from May 2013 to August 2018.

== Early life and education ==
Qaiser was born to Sardar Bahadur on 15 November 1969 in Swabi District, Pakistan. According to The Express Tribune, he was born on 15 November 1968 in Marghuz.

He is the eldest in a family of four brothers, including fellow politician Aqibullah Khan, and two sisters.

He received his early education from the Government Higher Secondary School in Marghuz. He graduated from the University of Peshawar. He graduated from the Government Post Graduate College (Swabi) and received a degree of Bachelor of Arts. During his student days he was known to be a good player of volleyball and field hockey.

After his graduation in 1995, he became divisional president of Pasban, a youth wing of Jamaat-e-Islami Pakistan.

== Political career ==
=== Jamaat-e-Islami ===
Qaiser began his political career with Jamaat-e-Islami Pakistan (JI). He was elected Nazim of Kotha College Swabi as a candidate of Islami Jamiat-e-Talaba in 1984 where he served for two years.

=== Pakistan Tehreek-e-Insaf ===
He joined Pakistan Tehreek-e-Insaf (PTI) after its formation in 1996. The same year, he was nominated as district president of PTI.

He ran for the National Assembly of Pakistan in the 1997 Pakistani general election as a candidate of the PTI, from NA-9 Swabi, but was unsuccessful. He received 4,113 votes and was defeated by Haji Rehmanullah, a candidate of the Awami National Party (ANP).

He ran for the National Assembly of Pakistan in the 2002 Pakistani general election as a candidate of the PTI, from NA-13 Swabi-II, but was unsuccessful. He received 766 votes and was defeated by Khalil Ahmad, a candidate of the Muttahida Majlis-e-Amal (MMA).

He was named the president of PTI Khyber Pakhtunkhwa in 2008, serving until 2013.

He was elected to the National Assembly as a candidate of PTI from Constituency NA-13 (Swabi-II) in 2013 Pakistani general election. He received 48,576 votes and defeated Attaul Haq, a candidate of Jamiat Ulema-e Islam (F) (JUI-F). In the same election, he was elected to the Provincial Assembly of Khyber Pakhtunkhwa as a candidate of PTI from Constituency PK-35 (Swabi-V). He received 14,165 votes and defeated Sajjad Ahmad, a candidate of Pakistan Muslim League (N) (PML-N). Following the election, he retained his Khyber Pakhtunkhwa assembly seat and vacated the National Assembly one.

==== Speaker of Provincial Assembly ====
On 30 May 2013, he was elected unopposed as the 14th Speaker of the Provincial Assembly of Khyber Pakhtunkhwa and served till the end of his tenure in 2018.

==== Speaker of National Assembly ====
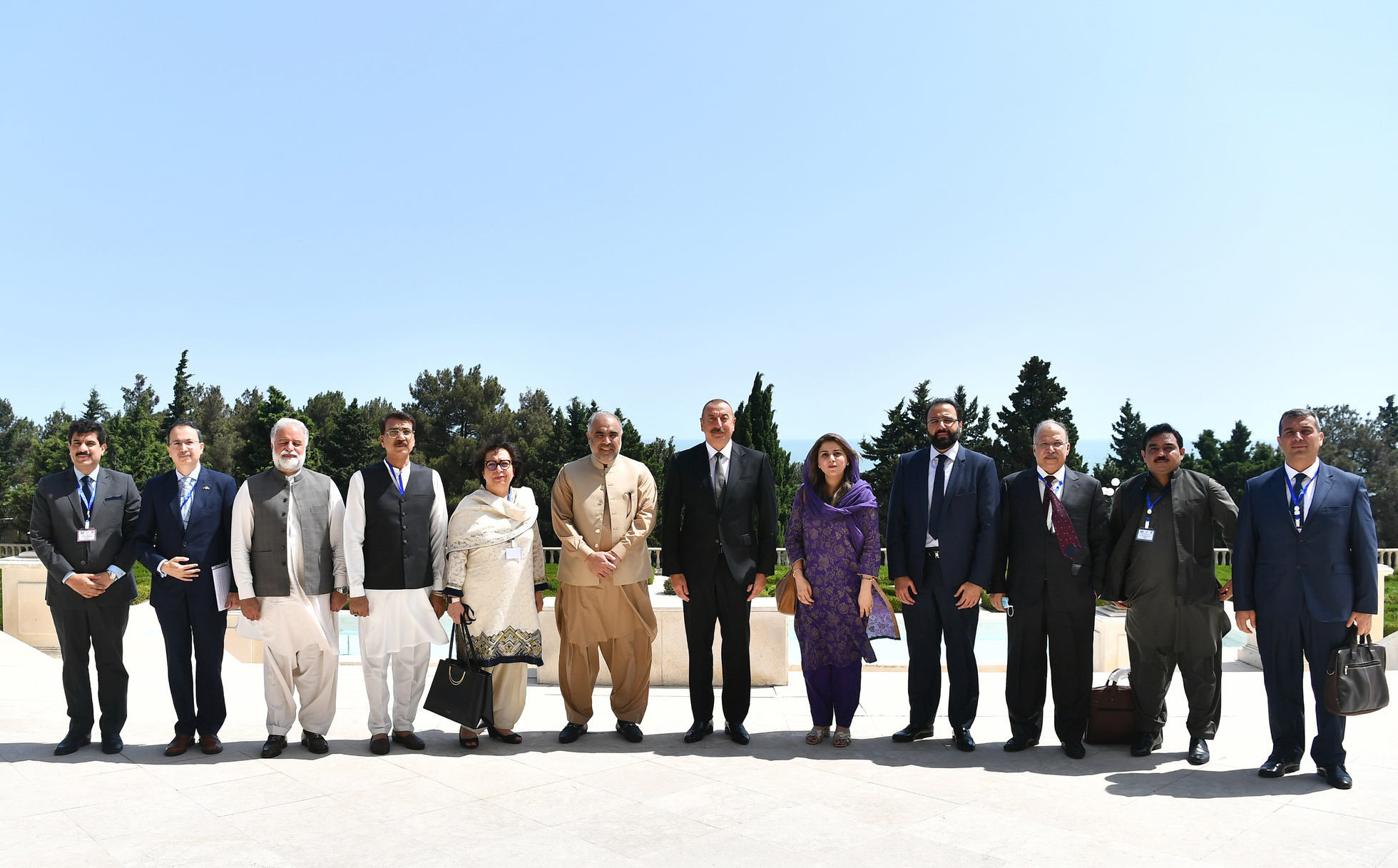
Qaiser in 2021 in a delegation meeting with Ilham Aliyev.

He was re-elected to the Provincial Assembly of Khyber Pakhtunkhwa as a candidate of PTI from Constituency PK-44 (Swabi-II) in the 2018 Pakistani general election. He received 31,658 votes and defeated Gul Zamin Shah, a candidate of the ANP. In the same election, he was re-elected to the National Assembly as a candidate of PTI from Constituency NA-18 (Swabi-I). He received 78,970 votes and defeated Maulana Fazal Ali Haqqani, a candidate of the MMA. Following his election, he abandoned his provincial assembly seat PK-44 (Swabi-II) in favor of the national assembly seat NA-18 (Swabi-I).

On 10 August 2018, he was nominated by PTI for the office of the Speaker of the National Assembly of Pakistan. On 15 August 2018, he was elected Speaker of the National Assembly of Pakistan. He received 176 votes against 146 votes of Syed Khurshid Ahmed Shah. He resigned from his office on 9 April 2022 prior to a vote of no confidence against Prime Minister Imran Khan.

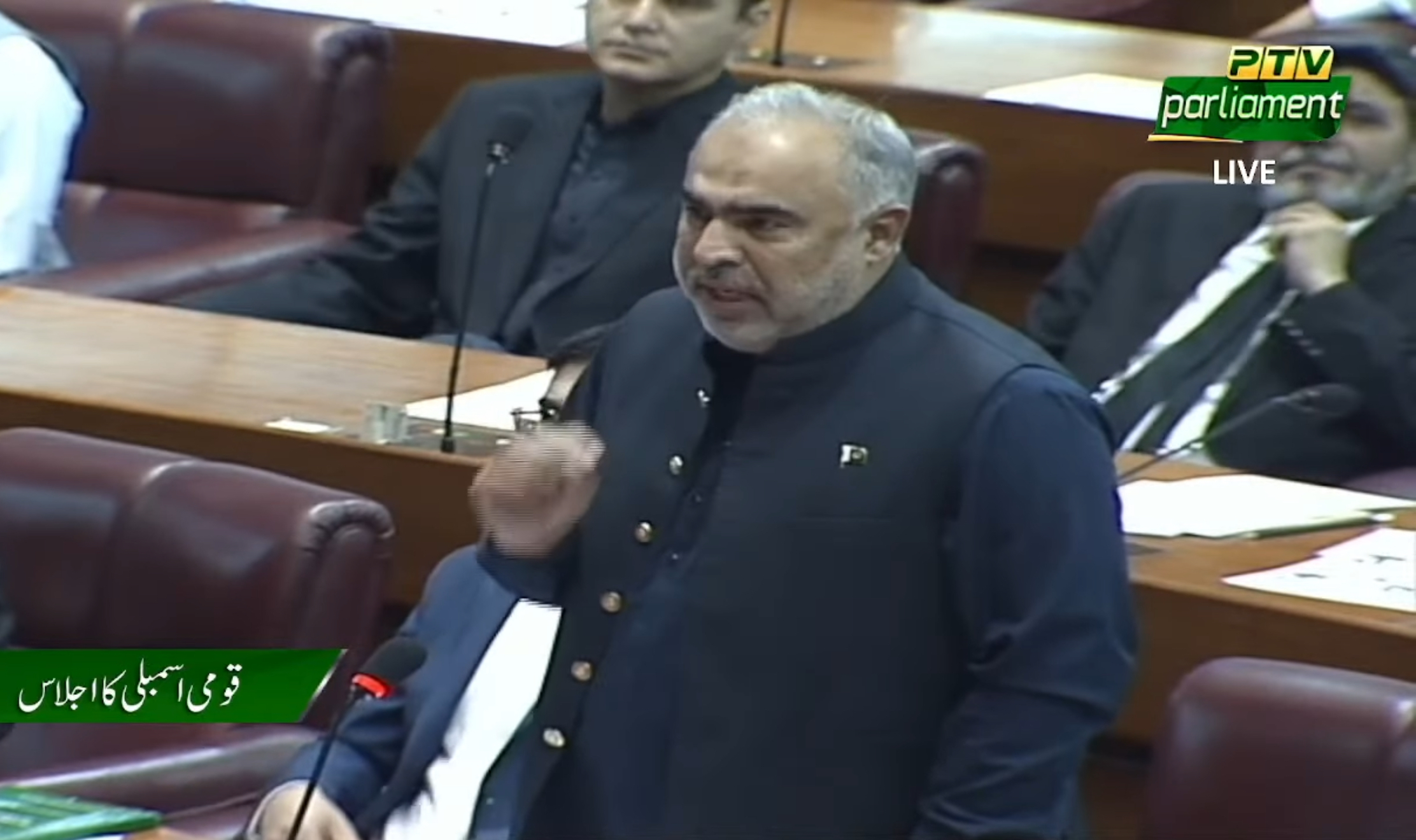
Qaiser speaking in the National Assembly of Pakistan, 2024.

==== 2024 Election ====
He was re-elected to the National Assembly of Pakistan as a candidate of PTI from Constituency NA-19 Swabi-I in the 2024 Pakistani general election. He received 115,635 votes while the runner-up Maulana Fazal Ali of JUI-F received 45,567 votes. As an MNA he raised distress on issues such as the government's alleged ‘coercive tactics’ to pass the 26th amendment to the constitution, arrest and crackdown tactics against PTI which he deemed an attack on democracy, and the rise of terrorism in Khyber Pakhtunkhwa.

== Personal life ==
=== Family ===
Qaiser is happily married and has two sons and two daughters.

=== Educationist ===
Qaiser founded the Quaid-e-Azam Public School in the town of Zaida in the Swabi District, now considered one of the best schools in the area.

=== Health ===
On 30 April 2020, Qaiser tested positive for COVID-19 during the coronavirus pandemic in Pakistan.

== See More ==
- Imran Khan
- Pakistan Tehreek-e-Insaf
- Speaker of the National Assembly of Pakistan
- Pakistan
