= Taraki =

Taraki may refer to:

- Nur Muhammad Taraki, Afghan politician, president of Afghanistan from 1978 to 1979
- Tarakai, a Pashtun tribe in Afghanistan
- Taraki Sivaram, Tamil journalist of Sri Lanka
