= Usman Khan =

Usman Khan may refer to:

- Usman Khan (Afghani cricketer), Afghani cricketer
- Usman Khan (murderer) (1991–2019), British terrorist and perpetrator of the 2019 London Bridge stabbing
- Usman Khan Tarakai (born 1947), Pakistani politician
- Usman Khan Shinwari (born 1994), Pakistani cricketer
- Usman Khan (cricketer) (born 1995), Pakistani cricketer
- Khwaja Usman (died 1612), Pashtun chieftain
