= Aqibullah Khan =

Pakistani politician

- عاقب ﷲ خان

Provincial Minister of Irrigation for Khyber Pakhtunkhwa
- In office 7 March 2024 – 13 October 2025

Member of the National Assembly of Pakistan
- In office 30 August 2013 – 31 May 2018
- Constituency: NA-13 (Swabi-II)

Member of the Provincial Assembly of Khyber Pakhtunkhwa
- Incumbent
- Assumed office 29 February 2024
- Constituency: PK-50 Swabi-II
- In office 24 October 2018 – 18 January 2023
- Constituency: PK-44 Swabi-II

Personal details
- Born: Swabi, Khyber Pakhtunkhwa, Pakistan
- Party: PTI (2013-present)
- Relatives: Asad Qaiser (brother)

Aqibullah Khan (Urdu: عاقب ﷲ خان) is a Pakistani politician who is currently serving as the Provincial Minister of Irrigation for Khyber Pakhtunkhwa in the Gandapur ministry since March 2024. He was a member of the National Assembly of Pakistan from August 2013 to May 2018. He is also currently a member of the Provincial Assembly of Khyber Pakhtunkhwa since February 2024 and previously served as an assembly member from October 2018 till January 2023. During his tenure as Provincial Minister of Irrigation for Khyber Pakhtunkhwa, a rise in small dam projects was reported, with 56 small dams built from March to July 2024 in the province.

== Early life ==
Aqibullah Khan received an MBA Finance Degree from IBMS Agriculture University Peshawar in 2000 and is a businessman by profession. He is the brother of Asad Qaiser.

== Political career ==
Khan was elected to the National Assembly of Pakistan as a candidate of Pakistan Tehreek-e-Insaf from Constituency NA-13 (Swabi-II) in a by-election held following the 2013 Pakistani general election. The seat fell vacant after his brother Asad Qaiser chose to retain his Provincial Assembly seat that he won in the 2013 general elections. He was allotted PTI ticket to run in August 2013 by-election despite nepotism concerns by some party members.

He was elected as a Member of the Provincial Assembly of Khyber Pakhtunkhwa in the 2018 Khyber Pakhtunkhwa provincial election from the seat PK-44 Swabi-II on a PTI ticket.

=== Irrigation Minister ===
He was re-elected from PK-50 Swabi-II in the 2024 Khyber Pakhtunkhwa provincial election on an Independent PTI-backed ticket. Following his election, he was inducted into the Gandapur ministry as the Provincial Minister of Irrigation on 7 March 2024. During his tenure as Provincial Minister for Irrigation in the PTI Gandapur ministry, a rise in small dam projects was reported, with 56 small dams built from March to July 2024 in the province. Several dams were also reported to be in construction by the Irrigation Department. Under Aqibullah and the PTI government, the quick construction and completion of the Warsak Canal Project was stated as a top development priority by Aqibullah for the province.
