= Swabi Maniri =

Maneri
- Union Council
- Country: Pakistan
- Province: Khyber Pakhtunkhwa
- District: Swabi
- Time zone: UTC+5 (PST)

Maneri is an administrative unit, known as Union council of Swabi District in the Khyber Pakhtunkhwa province of Pakistan.Maneri is divided into two union councils Maneri Bala and Maneri Payan.

District Swabi has 4 Tehsils i.e. Swabi Tehsil, Lahor, Topi Tehsil and Razar. Each Tehsil comprises certain numbers of union councils. There are 56 union councils in district Swabi.

== Notable people ==
- Muhammad Saleem Khan
- Babar Saleem

== See also ==
- Swabi District
- Amirkhel
