= Muhammad Sheeraz =

Pakistani politician

MPA Muhammad Sheeraz

Member of the Khyber Pakhtunkhwa Assembly
- Incumbent
- Assumed office 31 May 2013
- Constituency: PK-36 (Swabi-VI)

Personal details
- Born: 18 July 1956 (age 70) Topi, Swabi, Pakistan
- Party: Pakistan Muslim League (N)
- Occupation: Politician

Muhammad Sheeraz (born 18 July 1956) is a Pakistani politician hailing from Topi, Swabi District, who served a member of the Khyber Pakhtunkhwa Assembly and he belongs to the Pakistan Muslim League (N). He is also serving as a member of different committees.

== Political career ==
Sheeraz was elected as the member of the Khyber Pakhtunkhwa Assembly on the ticket of Pakistan Muslim League (N) from PK-36 (Swabi-VI) in the 2013 Pakistani general election.
