= Pervaiz Khan =

Pakistani politician

Member of the National Assembly of Pakistan
- In office 2008–2013
- Constituency: NA-13 (Sawabi-II)

Pervaiz Khan is a Pakistani politician who has been a member of the National Assembly of Pakistan from 2008 to 2013.

== Political career ==
He ran for the seat of the Khyber Pakhtunkhwa Assembly as a candidate of Pakistan Muslim League (Q) (PML-Q) from Constituency PK-36 (Swabi-VI) in the 2002 Pakistani general election but was unsuccessful. He received 4,130 votes and lost the seat to Sarfaraz Khan, as a candidate of Awami National Party (ANP).

He was elected to the National Assembly of Pakistan from Constituency NA-13 (Sawabi-II) as a candidate of ANP in the 2008 Pakistani general election. He received 26,603 votes and defeated Muhammad Naeem, a candidate of Pakistan Peoples Party (PPP).
