= NA-20 Swabi-II =

Constituency of the National Assembly of Pakistan

- Constituency for the National Assembly of Pakistan
- Region: Razar Tehsil and Lahor Tehsil (partly) of Swabi District
- Electorate: 557,897

Current constituency
- Party: Pakistan Tehreek-e-Insaf
- Member: Shahram Khan Tarakai
- Created from: NA-19 (Sawabi-II)

NA-20 Swabi-II (این اے-20، صوابی-۲) is a constituency for the National Assembly of Pakistan. The constituency was formerly known as NA-13 (Swabi-II) from 1977 to 2018. The name changed to NA-19 (Swabi-II) after the delimitation in 2018 and to NA-20 (Swabi-II) after the delimitation in 2022.

== Members of Parliament ==
=== 1977–2002: NA-13 Swabi-II ===
Election	Member	Party
1977	Air Marshal Asghar Khan	PNA
1985	Haji Javed Iqbal Abbasi	Independent
1988	Raja Sikandar Zaman Khan	IJI
1990	Gohar Ayub Khan	IJI
1993	Gohar Ayub Khan	PML-N
1997	Gohar Ayub Khan	PML-N

=== 2002–2018: NA-13 Swabi-II ===
Election	Member	Party
2002	Maulana Khalil Ahmad	MMA
2008	Pervaiz Khan	ANP
2013	Asad Qaiser	PTI
2013 By-election	Aqibullah Khan	PTI

=== 2018–2022: NA-19 Swabi-II ===
Election	Member	Party
2018	Usman Khan Tarakai	PTI

=== 2023–present: NA-20 Swabi-II ===
Election	Member	Party
2024	Shahram Khan Tarakai	SIC

== Elections since 2002 ==
=== 2002 general election ===
2002 General Election: NA-13 (Swabi-II)
Party	Candidate	Votes	%	±%
MMA	Maulana Khalil Ahmad	50,096	56.33	
ANP	Muhammad Sadiq Khan	19,471	21.90	
PML-N	Iftikhar Khan	16,749	18.83	
National Alliance	Professor Munawar Khan	1,853	2.08	
PTI	Asad Qaiser	766	0.86	
Majority		30,625	34.43	
Turnout		88,935	38.43	
MMA gain from PML-N				

A total of 2,515 votes were rejected.

=== 2008 general election ===
2008 General Election: NA-13 (Swabi-II)
Party	Candidate	Votes	%	±%
ANP	Perviz Khan Advocate	26,603	25.90	+4.00
PPPP	Muhammad Naeem	19,418	18.90	
PML-N	Liaqat Ahmed Khan	14,649	14.26	−4.57
MMA	Maulana Atta-ul-Haq	12,359	12.03	−44.30
PPP (S)	Fazal Wadood	10,695	10.41	
Independent	Khalil Ahmed	9,754	9.50	
Independent	Muhammad Asad	7,833	7.63	
Independent	Ishaq Ahmed Advocate	949	0.92	
Pakistan Awami Party	Raziq Dad	460	0.45	
Majority		7,185	7.00	
Turnout		102,720	36.65	−1.78
ANP gain from MMA				

A total of 2,685 votes were rejected.

=== 2013 general election ===
2013 General Election: NA-13 (Swabi-II)
Party	Candidate	Votes	%	±%
PTI	Asad Qaiser	48,576	31.19	
JUI-F	Attaul Haq	28,672	18.41	
PML-N	Iftikhar Ahmed Khan	21,416	13.75	−0.51
AJIP	Shahram Khan	14,495	9.31	
ANP	Muhammad Sarwar Khan	14,201	9.12	−16.78
JUI-N	Mulana Khalil Ahmad	7,765	4.99	
PPPP	Muhammad Naeem	6,824	4.38	−14.52
JI	Amir Nawaz Khan	4,886	3.14	
TTP	Shabab	4,293	2.76	
Independent	Shahid Khan	1,165	0.75	
Independent	Shamsul Qamar	1,075	0.69	
Independent	Muhammad Kaleem	585	0.37	
Pakistani Patriotic Movement	Abdul Rasheed Yousafzai	454	0.29	
PkMAP	Muhammad Usman Khan	398	0.25	
Jannat Pakistan Party	Inamullah	380	0.24	
MDM	Muhammad Jamil	252	0.16	
Independent	Said Anwar Shah	198	0.13	
AWP	Hakeem Khan	110	0.07	
Majority		19,904	12.78	
Turnout		155,745	43.90	+7.25
PTI gain from ANP				

A total of 4,191 votes were rejected.

=== 2013 By-election ===
The member elected in the 2013 General Election, Asad Qasiar, decided to vacate this seat. This resulted in a by-election being triggered, which took place on 22 August 2013.

2013 By-election: NA-13 (Swabi-II)
Party	Candidate	Votes	%	±%
PTI	Aqibullah Khan	43,333	54.63	+23.44
JUI-F	Attaul Haq	32,300	40.72	+22.31
Jannat Pakistan Party	Aurang Sher	946	1.19	0.95
Independent	Shamsul Qamar	903	1.14	
Independent	Attaullah Shah	601	0.76	
TTP	Khalid Mehmood	425	0.54	−2.22
Independent	Ishaq Ahmed	372	0.47	
Independent	Umar Gul	295	0.37	
Independent	Muhammad Kaleem	83	0.10	
Independent	Muhammad Ayaz	66	0.08	
Majority		11,033	13.91	
Turnout		79,324	22.12	−21.78
PTI hold		Swing		

A total of 917 votes were rejected.

=== 2018 general election ===
General elections were held on 25 July 2018.

General election 2018: NA-19 (Swabi-II)
Party	Candidate	Votes	%	±%
PTI	Usman Khan Tarakai	83,903	39.63	▼15.00
ANP	Waris Khan	53,286	25.17	▲25.17
MMA	Attaul Haq	31,373	14.82	▼7.49^{†}
PPP	Muhammad Naeem Khan	16,158	7.63	▲7.63
PML(N)	Imranullah	13,977	6.60	▲6.60
Others	Others (four candidates)	5,010	2.36	
Turnout		211,730	45.67	▲23.55
Rejected ballots		8,023	3.79	
Majority		30,617	14.46	
Registered electors		463,621		
PTI hold		Swing	▼20.09	

^{†}JUI-F contested as part of MMA

=== 2024 general election ===
General elections were held on 8 February 2024. Shahram Khan Tarakai won with 123,828 votes.

General election 2024: NA-20 Swabi-II
Party	Candidate	Votes	%	±%
PTI	Shahram Khan Tarakai (Note: Filed nomination papers as PTI candidate but ECP allowed him to run as an Independent)	123,828	57.62	▲17.99
ANP	Waris Khan	48,286	22.47	▼2.70
JUI (F)	Abdur Rahim Khan	19,637	9.14	N/A
PPP	Usman Khan Tarakai	16,224	7.55	▼0.08
Others	Others (six candidates)	6.920	3.22	
Turnout		222,594	39.91	▼5.76
Rejected ballots		7,699	3.46	
Majority		75,542	35.15	▲20.69
Registered electors		557,799		

== See also ==
- NA-19 Swabi-I
- NA-21 Mardan-I
