= Swabi Qaumi Mahaz =

Swabi Qaumi Mahaz صوابی قومی محاذ
- Abbreviation: SQM
- Chairperson: Babar Saleem
- Founder: Dr. Muhammad Saleem Khan
- Founded: 1994; 32 years ago
- Dissolved: 2018; 8 years ago
- Split from: Awami National Party
- Merged into: PTI
- Headquarters: Swabi, Khyber Pakhtunkhwa, Pakistan
- Ideology: Regionalism; local leadership; Pashtun regional identity

Swabi Qaumi Mahaz (SQM) (Urdu: صوابی قومی محاذ) was a regional political party in Swabi District, Khyber Pakhtunkhwa, Pakistan. It was founded in 1994 by dissidents from the Awami National Party in Swabi by Dr. Muhammad Saleem Khan and others. Later, it was led by the family of Dr. Saleem Khan, particularly his son Babar Saleem. Over time, the party faced internal divisions, partial mergers, and eventual merger into the Pakistan Tehreek-e-Insaf (PTI) by March 2018.

== History ==
The Swabi Qaumi Mahaz was founded in 1994 by former MPA Dr. Muhammad Saleem Khan along with other local leaders such as former forest minister Awwal Sher Khan, former MPAbdul Majid Khan and Asmatullah. This formation came about as a result of differences within the Awami National Party (ANP) over ticket distribution and influence in Swabi.

== Leadership ==
=== Saleem Khan ===
After the split, Dr. Salim Khan led the new group. He was later elected as MPA from PF-31 (Swabi-I) in the 2002 provincial elections under the banner of SQM.

=== Babar Saleem ===
After the death of Dr. Muhammad Saleem in 2009, his son Babar Saleem took over as the chairman of SQM. In the 2013 elections, Babar contested and won the election to the Khyber Pakhtunkhwa Assembly (as an MPA) through an alliance with Awami Jamhuri Ittehad Pakistan (AJIP).

== Merger ==
In March 2018, several SQM officials (including former Senior Vice Chairman Noorzada, Vice Chairman Iqbal Ahmed, and former General Secretary Liaquat Yousafzai) announced the merger of SQM with Pakistan Tehreek-e-Insaf (PTI).

However, Babar Saleem publicly denied the move, saying that as chairman, no one else has the right to dissolve or absorb the party. Meanwhile, Babar Saleem hinted at joining the PML-N, complicating the internal dynamics.

== Electoral history ==
Electoral Performance in KP Assembly
Election	Votes	%	Seats	+/–
2002 (PF-31, Swabi-I)	18,529	0.68	1 / 145	▲1
2008 (PK31, Swabi)	7969	0	0 / 145	▼1
2013 (PK-31, Swabi-I)	16,549	0.68	1 / 145	▲1

== Symbol ==
In September 2002, the Swabi Qaumi Mahaz (SQM) formally applied to the Election Commission of Pakistan for an election symbol, following a Peshawar High Court ruling ordering its registration as a political party. Because the ECP had not approved SQM's application for its symbol in time, its leader, Dr. Muhammad Saleem Khan, contested the 2002 and 2008 provincial elections as an independent candidate.

Later, Babar Saleem contested and won the 2013 KP Assembly election from PK-31 (Swabi-I) under the banner of Awami Jamhuri Ittehad Pakistan (AJIP), as part of an electoral alliance.

== See also ==
- Awami Jamhuri Ittehad Pakistan
