= Jamshed Khan =

Pakistani politician

Member of the Provincial Assembly of Khyber Pakhtunkhwa
- In office 2002–2008
- Preceded by: Muhammad Karim Babak
- Succeeded by: Sardar Hussain Babak
- Constituency: PK-77 Buner-I

Personal details
- Born: Buner District, Khyber Pakhtunkhwa, Pakistan
- Died: 22 January 2026
- Party: Pakistan Peoples Party–Sherpao; Jamaat-e-Islami (2010-2017); Pakistan Tehreek-e-Insaf (2017-2026)
- Children: Abdul Kabir Khan

Jamshed Khan (Urdu: جمشید خان) was a Pakistani politician from Buner District who served as a member of the Provincial Assembly of Khyber Pakhtunkhwa from 2002 to 2008.

== Career ==
He was elected as member of the Provincial Assembly of Khyber Pakhtunkhwa in the 2002 Pakistani general election. He again contested the 2008 general election from PK-77 on the ticket of Pakistan Peoples Party–Sherpao and came second to Awami National Party's Sardar Hussain Babak. He joined Jamaat-e-Islami (JI) in 2010. In October 2017 during the visit of Pakistan Tehreek-e-Insaaf Chairman Imran Khan and Chief Minister Pervez Khattak, Jamshed Khan joined the PTI.

== Personal life ==
Khan has a son, Abdul Kabir Khan, who is also a politician and was elected to the Provincial Assembly of Khyber Pakhtunkhwa from PK-27 (Buner-III) in the 2024 general election as a PTI candidate.
