= Meraj Hamayun Khan =

Pashtun social worker (born 1945)

MPA Meraj Hamayun Khan

Member of the Khyber Pakhtunkhwa Assembly
- Incumbent
- Assumed office 31 May 2013
- Constituency: WR-19

Personal details
- Born: 8 August 1945 (age 80) Swabi District, NWFP
- Party: Pakistan Muslim League (N)
- Occupation: Educationist, social worker, politician

Meraj Hamayun Khan (born 8 August 1945) is a Pakistani educationist, social worker and politician from Swabi District who is a member of the Khyber Pakhtunkhwa Assembly belonging to the Qaumi Watan Party. She is a committee chairperson and a member of various committees.

== Political career ==
Meraj was elected as the member of the Khyber Pakhtunkhwa Assembly on the ticket of Qaumi Watan Party from Constituency WR-19 at the 2013 Pakistani general election. She joined PML(N) on 23 September 2019 at a party workers' convention at Swabi.

== Education and award ==
Meraj Hamayun Khan has degrees in MEd, BSc and MA. She was conferred Aizaz-e-Fazeelat for Education by the President of Pakistan in 2002.
