= PK-27 Buner-III =

Pakistani electoral district

- Constituency for the Khyber Pakhtunkhwa Assembly
- Region: Khudu Khel and Mandanr Tehsils of Buner District

Current constituency
- Party: Pakistan Tehreek-e-Insaf-IND
- Member(s): Abdul Kabir Khan
- Created from: PK-77 Bunair-I (2002–2018); PK-22 Buner-III (2018–2023)

PK-27 Buner-III (پی کے-27 بونیر-3) is a constituency for the Khyber Pakhtunkhwa Assembly of the Khyber Pakhtunkhwa province of Pakistan.

== Elected members ==
- Muhammad Karim Babak (1988-1990)
- Sarzamin Khan (1990-1993)
- Nadar Khan (1993-1997)
- Muhammad Karim Babak (1997-2002)
- Jamshed Khan (2002–2008)
- Sardar Hussain Babak (2008–2013)
- Sardar Hussain Babak (2013–2018)
- Sardar Hussain Babak (2018–2023)
- Abdul Kabir Khan (2024–present)

== See also ==
- PK-25 Buner-I
- PK-26 Buner-II
