= Sardar Hussain Babak =

Politician in Pakistan

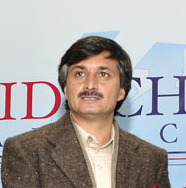
- Sardar Hussain Babak

Member of the Provincial Assembly of Khyber Pakhtunkhwa
- In office 2018–2023
- Succeeded by: Abdul Kabir Khan
- Constituency: PK-22 (Buner-III)
- In office 31 May 2013 – 28 May 2018
- In office 2008–2013
- Preceded by: Jamshed Khan
- Constituency: PK-77 (Buner-I)

Minister of KPK Elementary & Secondary Education
- In office 2008–2013
- Preceded by: Maulana Fazal Ali Haqqani
- Succeeded by: Muhammad Atif

Personal details
- Party: Awami National Party
- Other political affiliations: ANP
- Relatives: Muhammad Karim Babak (uncle)
- Education: Government Superior Science College Peshawar; Islamia College University; University of Peshawar
- Occupation: Politician

Sardar Hussain Babak (Urdu: سردار حسين بابک) is a Pakistani politician from the village Totalai, Buner District who had been a member of the Khyber Pakhtunkhwa Assembly belonging to the Awami National Party (ANP) from August 2018 till January 2023. He also served as a member of the different committees.

== Early life and education ==
Babak completed high school from his village Totalai, intermediate from Government Superior Science College Peshawar, BSc degree from Islamia College University and his master's degree in journalism from the University of Peshawar.

== Political career ==
Sardar Hussain Babak started his political career back in 2002, as a candidate of the Awami National Party (ANP) from constituency PK-77 (now PK-22). He was elected as member of the Assembly from the same constituency in 2008, 2013 and 2018. He is currently serving as Parliamentary leader of the Awami National Party in Khyber Pakhtunkhwa Assembly. He is also a Chairman of the Standing Committee on Inter Provincial Coordination Department and member of the Standing Committee on Sports, Tourism, Archaeology, Youth Affairs & Museums Department, Standing Committee on Elementary and Secondary Education Department and Standing Committee on Planning and Development Department of the Khyber Pakhtunkhwa Assembly. He was also a member of the Standing Committee on Elementary and Secondary Education committee of Khyber Pakhtunkhwa Assembly in 2013.

He also served as Education Minister and member of the Khyber Pakhtunkhwa Assembly from 2008 to 2013.

He is also serving as General Secretary Awami National Party (ANP) Khyber Pakhtunkhwa.

Political offices
Preceded by Maulana Fazal Ali Haqqani	Ministers KPK Elementary & Secondary Education; 2008—2013	Succeeded by Muhammad Atif
