= Abdul Kabir Khan =

Pakistani politician

Member of the Provincial Assembly of Khyber Pakhtunkhwa
- Incumbent
- Assumed office 29 February 2024
- Preceded by: Sardar Hussain Babak
- Constituency: PK-27 Buner-III

Personal details
- Born: Buner District, Khyber Pakhtunkhwa, Pakistan
- Party: PTI (2024-present)
- Parent: Jamshed Khan (father)
- Education: Khyber Law College

Abdul Kabir Khan is a Pakistani politician from Buner District. He is currently serving as member of the Provincial Assembly of Khyber Pakhtunkhwa since February 2024. He is the son of former MPA Jamshed Khan.

== Career ==
He contested the 2024 general elections as a Pakistan Tehreek-e-Insaf/Independent candidate from PK-27 Buner-III. He secured 27,821 votes. The runner-up was Sardar Hussain Babak of Awami National Party who secured 15,439 votes.
