= Muhammad Karim Babak =

Pakistani politician

Muhammad Karim Babak MPA

Member of the Provincial Assembly of Khyber Pakhtunkhwa
- In office 1988–1990
- Succeeded by: Sarzamin Khan
- Constituency: PK63 Swat
- In office 1997–1999
- Preceded by: Nadar Khan
- Succeeded by: Jamshed Khan
- Constituency: PF-63 Buner

Personal details
- Born: 1947 (age 78–79) Totalai, Khudu Khel, Buner
- Party: Awami National Party (ANP)
- Relatives: Sardar Hussain Babak (nephew); Shamim Shahid (nephew)
- Occupation: Politician

Muhammad Karim Babak (born; 1947) is a Pakistani politician who had been a member of the National Assembly of Pakistan from 1988 to 1990 and 1997 to 1999.

== Political career ==
Babak also served as Minister of transportation of the Khyber Pakhtunkhwa Assembly.
