= Shahram Khan Tarakai =

Pakistani politician & Member National Assembly Of Pakistan From District Swabi

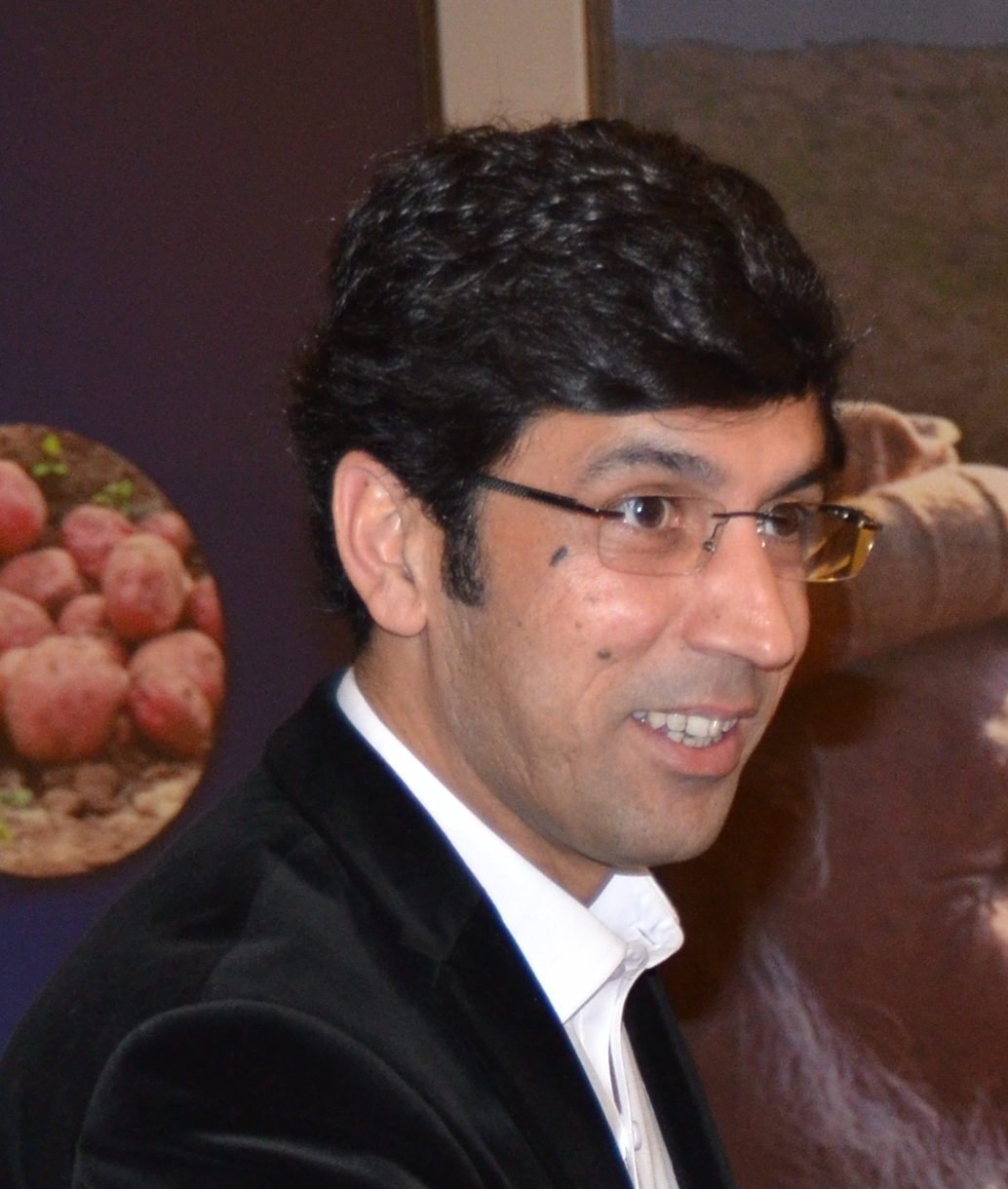

Provincial Minister of Khyber Pakhtunkhwa for Local Government, Elections, and Rural Development
- In office 29 August 2018 – 26 January 2020
- Chief Minister: Mahmood Khan

Member of the Provincial Assembly of Khyber Pakhtunkhwa
- In office 13 August 2018 – 18 January 2023
- Constituency: PK-47 (Swabi-V)
- In office 29 May 2013 – 28 May 2018

Provincial Minister of Khyber Pakhtunkha for Education
- In office 18 September 2020 – 18 January 2023
- Constituency: PK-32 (Swabi-II)

Member of the National Assembly of Pakistan
- Incumbent
- Assumed office 29 February 2024
- Constituency: NA-20 Swabi-II

Personal details
- Party: PTI (2015-present)
- Other political affiliations: Awami Jamhuri Ittehad Pakistan (2012–2015)
- Parent: Liaqat Khan Tarakai (father)
- Relatives: Faisal Khan Tarakai (brother); Usman Khan Tarrakai (uncle); Muhammad Ali Tarakai (uncle); Murtaza Khan Tarakai (cousin)

Shahram Khan Tarakai (Urdu: شاہرام خان ترکئی) is a Pakistani politician who was Provincial Minister of Khyber Pakhtunkhwa for Local Government, Elections and Rural Development, in office from 29 August 2018 till 26 January 2020 and later on Provincial Minister for Elementary and Secondary Education till 14 January 2023 when the Provincial Assembly of Khyber Pakhtunkhwa was dissolved by the then Chief Minister on the instructions of Imran Khan. He is currently a member of the National Assembly of Pakistan since February 2024 and had been a member of the Provincial Assembly of Khyber Pakhtunkhwa from August 2018 till January 2023.

Shahram Khan owns a tobacco business and is one of the highest contributors to the Tobacco Industry. He is known for his charity works in his constituency.

Previously, he was a member of the Provincial Assembly of Khyber Pakhtunkhwa from May 2013 to May 2018. During his first tenure as Member of the Khyber Pakhtunkhwa Assembly, he first served as Provincial Minister for Agriculture and then for Health between June 2013 and May 2018.

== Early life ==
Shahram Khan was born in Tarakai House of Tehsil Razar, District Swabi, Khyber Pakhtunkhwa to a well known Industrialist and Politician Liaqat Khan Tarakai from the Tarakai sub-clan of Ghilji Tribe of Pashtuns. He is the eldest amongst his siblings.

Shahram Khan got his early life education at Fazal Haq College Mardan and Edwards College Peshawar before travelling to the UK and Australia for further studies.

== Political career ==
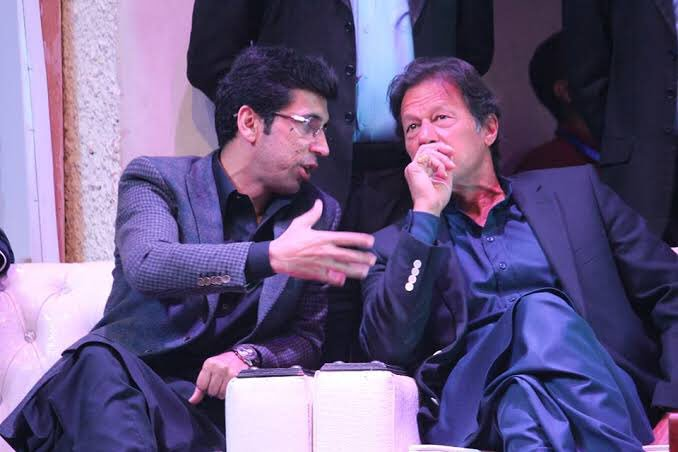
Tarakai with Prime Minister Imran Khan in 2019.

Khan for the first time entered into politics in 2005 after coming from abroad when he ran for District Nazim for Swabi in 2005 Local Government Elections and won the office on huge margin.

In his tenure as a District Nazim, both Pervez Musharraf the then President of Pakistan and Shaukat Aziz the then Prime Minister of Pakistan visited Swabi and announced huge amount for Municipal purposes.

He co-founded Awami Jamhuri Ittehad Pakistan (AJIP) in 2012.

He ran for the seat of the National Assembly of Pakistan as a candidate of AJIP from Constituency NA-13 (Swabi-II) in the 2013 Pakistani general election but was unsuccessful. He received 14,495 votes and lost the seat to Asad Qaiser. In the same election, he was elected to the Provincial Assembly of Khyber Pakhtunkhwa as a candidate of AJIP from Constituency PK-32 (Swabi-II). He received 20,111 votes and defeated Amir Rehman, a candidate of Awami National Party (ANP). Following the election, AJIP forged coalition with Pakistan Tehreek-e-Insaf (PTI).

On 14 June 2013, he was inducted into the provincial Khyber Pakhtunkhwa cabinet of Chief Minister Pervez Khattak and was appointed as Provincial Minister of Khyber Pakhtunkhwa for agriculture.

In a cabinet reshuffle in March 2014, he was appointed as Provincial Minister of Khyber Pakhtunkhwa for health and was given the status of the senior minister in the cabinet. In November 2015, AJIP merged with PTI. Shahram Khan in a public gathering of PTI on 22 November 2015 announced the merger of both the parties for the betterment of the people of Swabi. Imran Khan was also present in the gathering as a chief guest.

He was re-elected to the Provincial Assembly of Khyber Pakhtunkhwa as a candidate of PTI from Constituency PK-47 (Swabi-V) in the 2018 Pakistani general election.

On 29 August 2018, he was inducted into the provincial Khyber Pakhtunkhwa cabinet of Chief Minister Mahmood Khan and was appointed as Provincial Minister of Khyber Pakhtunkhwa for Local Government, Elections and Rural Development. He passed the Local Government bill 2019 from the Provincial Assembly of Khyber Pakhtunkhwa.

He was among the three ministers who were abruptly removed from KP cabinet on charges of creating grouping in the ruling PTI. These allegations were denied by Shahram Tarakai and when cleared, was awarded Provincial Ministry for Elementary and Secondary Education. Tarakai served as Provincial Minister till the dissolution of Provincial Assembly in January 2023.

== See also ==
- Imran Khan
- Pakistan
