= Warsak Dam =

Dam in Khyber Pakhtunkhwa, Pakistan

Warsak Dam, District Mohmand
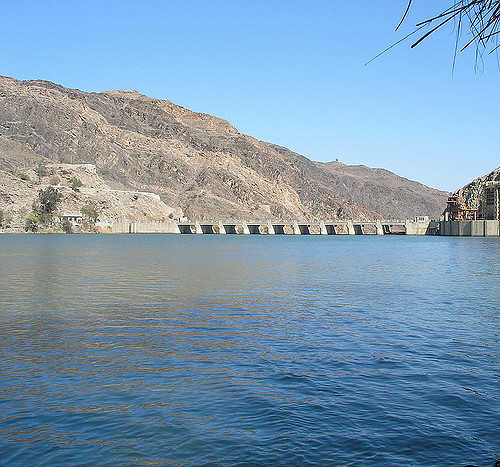

- Location within Khyber Pakhtunkhwa Location within Pakistan
- Official name: د ورسک بند
- Country: Pakistan
- Location: Kabul River, District Mohmand
- Coordinates: 34°09′50″N 71°21′29″E
- Status: Operational
- Construction began: 1949
- Opening date: 1960
- Owner: The Royalty of Warsak Dam belongs to the Public of District Mohmand

Dam and spillways
- Type of dam: Gravity
- Impounds: Kabul River
- Height: 76.2 m (250 ft)
- Length: 140.2 m (460 ft)
- Spillways: 9 floodgates
- Spillway type: Service, controlled
- Spillway capacity: 540 m^{3}/s (19,070 cu ft/s)

Reservoir
- Active capacity: 31,207,090 m^{3} (25,300 acre⋅ft) (design, now silted)
- Surface area: 10.3 km^{2} (4 sq mi)

Power Station
- Commission date: 1960, 1981
- Hydraulic head: 43.89 m (144 ft)
- Turbines: 4 x 40 MW, 2 x 41.5 MW Francis-type
- Installed capacity: 243 MW
- Annual generation: 1100 GWh

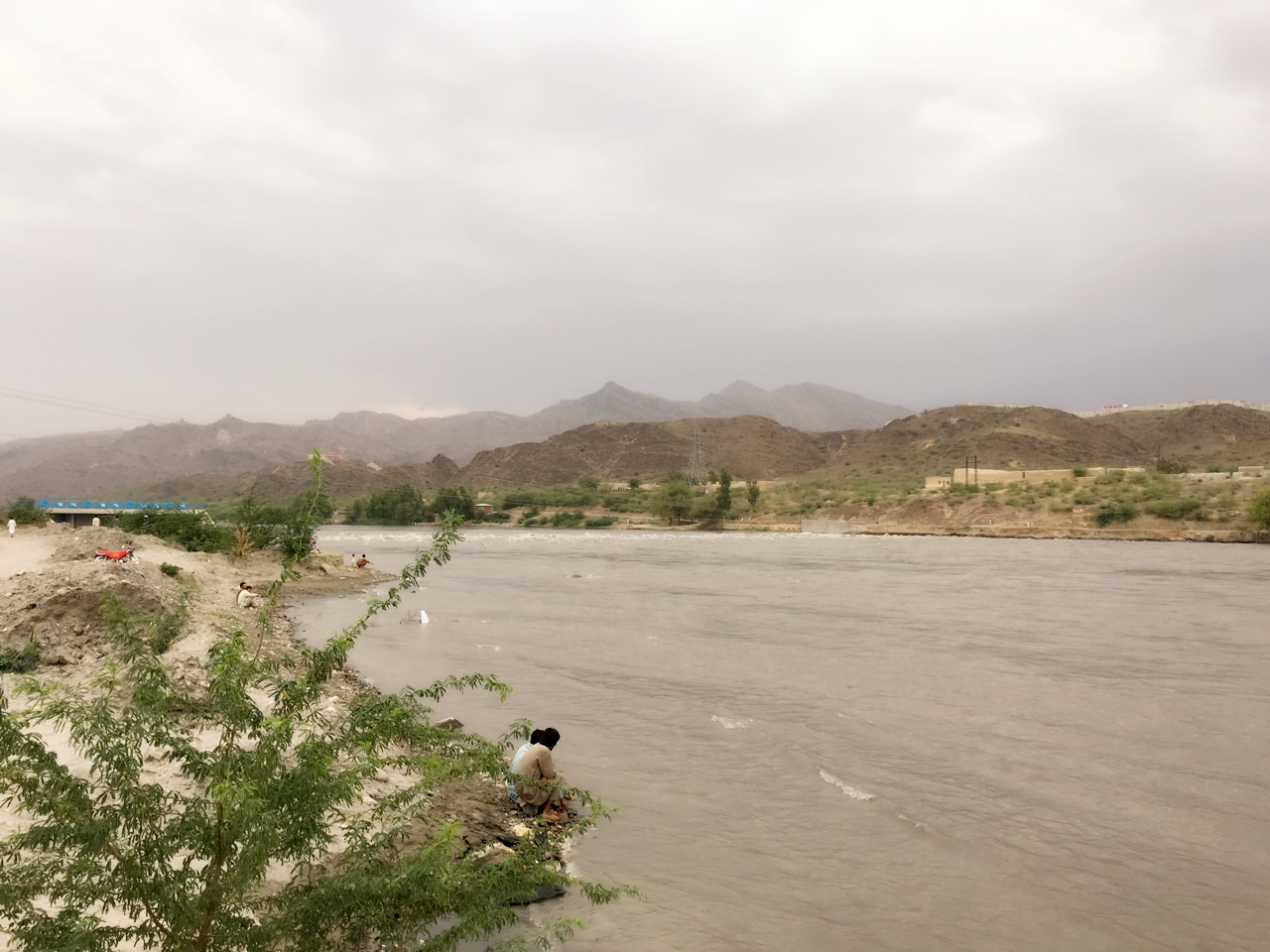
River Kabul near Warsak Dam

Warsak Dam (Pashto: د ورسک بند; Urdu: بند ورسک) is a mass concrete gravity dam located on the Kabul River in District Mohmand, Mechni, approximately 30 km northwest from the city of Peshawar in the Khyber Pakhtunkhwa province of Pakistan.

== History ==
Warsak Dam was completed under the Colombo Plan in two phases and financed by the Canadian Government. The first phase was completed in 1960 and consisted of the construction of the dam. Irrigation tunnels and installation of four power generating units, each of 40 MW capacity with 132 kV transmission system, were also completed in 1960. Two additional generating units of 41.48 MW capacity each were added in 1980-81 in the second phase.

== Capacity ==
The total installed capacity of the Warsak Dam Hydropower Project is 243 MW. In June 2012, the Pakistan WAPDA (Water and Power Development Authority) decided to add a 375 MW powerhouse to Warsak, which will raise Warsak's total power generation capacity to 525 MW. No date was given on when the project would be complete.

== Rehabilitation ==
Germany will loan 40 million euros to Pakistan for the rehabilitation of the Warsak hydroelectric power station built over half a century ago on Kabul River in Khyber Pakhtunkhwa. According to Water and Power Development Authority, this is the second time that Warsak hydroelectric power station will be renovated. They plan to overcome several problems, including regaining the capacity loss of 30MW with reliable annual energy generation of 1,144GWh, upgrade and modernise the old system, and achieve another life cycle of 30 to 40 years. The current rehabilitation work will be financed by Germany, France and the European Union Extension is being planned. Germany and France will loan 40 million euros each to Pakistan for the rehabilitation of the Dam. The total cost of the project is euro 162m and it is being co-financed with the German Development Bank (KfW), European Investment Bank (EIB), French Agency for Development (AFD) and Pakistan government contributions.

== See also ==
- Warsak Canal Project
- List of dams and reservoirs in Pakistan
- List of power stations in Pakistan
