= Muhammad Saleem Khan =

- ڈاکٹر محمد سلیم خان

Member of the Provincial Assembly of Khyber Pakhtunkhwa (then NWFP)
- In office 1993–1996
- Constituency: PF-24 Swabi

Member of the Provincial Assembly of Khyber Pakhtunkhwa (then NWFP)
- In office 2002–2007
- Constituency: PF-31 (Swabi-I)

Provincial Minister for Health, North-West Frontier Province / Khyber Pakhtunkhwa
- In office 2002–2007
- Succeeded by: Syed Zahir Ali Shah

Personal details
- Born: Maneri Bala, Swabi
- Died: 7 February 2009
- Party: Awami National Party; Swabi Qaumi Mahaz (SQM)
- Children: Babar Saleem
- Parent(s): Muhammad Firdous Khan (father); Bibi Zohra (mother)
- Occupation: Politician, Physician

Muhammad Salim Khan (died 7 February 2009) was a Pakistani politician, physician and one of the founders of the Swabi Qaumi Mahaz (SQM), who served twice as a Member of the Provincial Assembly (MPA) from Swabi PF-24 Swabi 1993-1996 and (PF-31 Swabi-I), Khyber Pakhtunkhwa (formerly NWFP) from 2002 to 2007. He also held the Health portfolio in the provincial government. He is the father of Babar Saleem.

== Political career ==
Muhammad Saleem Khan was associated with the Awami National Party (ANP) early in his political career and was connected to the Khudai Khidmatgar movement through his family.

Saleem was elected from Constituency PF-24 Swabi on an ANP ticket in 1993, but lost the election to ANP's Saleem Khan Advocate after becoming an independent candidate in the 1997 elections.

He co-founded the Swabi Qaumi Mahaz (SQM) around 1997 when there were differences with the ANP leadership regarding tickets.

He was elected as an MPA from Constituency PF-31 Swabi-I as an independent in the 2002 provincial elections, serving from 2002 to 2007. He also served as the provincial health minister in the North-West Frontier Province (present-day Khyber Pakhtunkhwa) at some point.

In the 2008 provincial election for PK-31 (Swabi-I), Muhammad Zarshid of ANP won with 9,482 votes, defeating Saleem (running as an independent), who received 7,969 votes.

== Death ==
Saleem died on 7 February 2009.
