= Khyber Pakhtunkhwa Elementary and Secondary Education Department =

Department of government of Khyber Pakhtunkhwa

Khyber Pakhtunkhwa Elementary & Secondary Education Department

Agency overview
- Jurisdiction: Government of Khyber Pakhtunkhwa
- Headquarters: Peshawar, Khyber Pakhtunkhwa, Pakistan; 34.0140928°N 71.5746268°E
- Employees: 1,68,000+
- Minister responsible: Fateh-ul-Mulk Ali Nasir
- Website: Official Website

Analysis of Education in KPK

Pakhtunkhwa Elementary and Secondary Education Department or KPESED is the biggest department of Khyber Pakhtunkhwa responsible for Elementary and Secondary Education.
