= Khalil Ahmad Mukhlis =

Pakistani politician (died 2024)

Maulana Khalil Ahmad MNA

Member of the National Assembly of Pakistan
- In office 2002–2007
- Constituency: NA-12 (Swabi-II)

Personal details
- Born: 1955 or 1956
- Died: 1 December 2024 (aged 68) Kotha, Swabi District, Khyber Pakhtunkhwa, Pakistan
- Party: Jamiat Ulama-e-Islam Nazryati; Muttahida Majlis-e-Amal (MMA)
- Occupation: Politician

Maulana Khalil Ahmad Mukhlis (Urdu: مولانا خلیل احمد مخلص; 1955 or 1956 – 1 December 2024) was a Pakistani politician and central emir of the Jamiat Ulama-e-Islam Nazryati who had served as a member of the National Assembly of Pakistan from 2002 to 2007. He died on 1 December 2024.

== Career ==
Mukhlis was a member and central emir of the Jamiat Ulama-e-Islam Nazryati. He was elected member of the National Assembly of Pakistan in the 1990 general election from the then constituency NA-13 (Swabi-II) on Jamiat Ulema-e-Islam (F)'s ticket. He had resigned from the seat of the National Assembly in opposition to the Legal Framework Order, 2002 and the Seventeenth Amendment to the Constitution of Pakistan.

== Death ==
Mukhlis died of a cardiac arrest in Swabi, on 1 December 2024, at the age of 68.
