= Fazal Ali Haqqani =

Pakistani politician

Minister of KPK Elementary & Secondary Education
- In office 2002–2007

Member of the Khyber Pakhtunkhwa Assembly
- In office 2002–2007
- Governor: Iftikhar Hussain Shah; Khalilur Rehman
- Chief minister: Akram Khan Durrani
- Succeeded by: Sardar Hussain Babak
- Constituency: PK-35 (Swabi-V)

Personal details
- Party: ANP (2025-present)
- Other political affiliations: JUI (F) (2002-2025)
- Occupation: Politician

Fazal Ali Haqqani is a Pakistani politician from Zarobi, Swabi District, belong to the Jamiat Ulema-e-Islam (F) who served as Minister of Education and member of the NWFP Assembly (then) now Khyber Pakhtunkhwa Assembly from 2002 to 2007.

== See also ==
- List of Deobandis

Political offices
| Preceded by | Ministers KPK Elementary & Secondary Education; 2002—2007 | Succeeded by Sardar Hussain Babak |
