= Warsak Canal Project =

Specifications
- Status: Under construction

History
- Date completed: February 2027

The Warsak Canal Project is an initiative focused on enhancing agricultural practices in the Peshawar and Nowshera districts of Khyber Pakhtunkhwa, Pakistan.

== Background ==
The Warsak Canal Project, also recognized as the Remodeling of Warsak Canal System Project, is projected to augment the water flow in the Warsak canal to a capacity of up to 1250 cusecs. This heightened water flow is expected to significantly enhance farming and agricultural activities in the region.

== Impact on agriculture ==
The initiative aims to provide irrigation to numerous acres of land in Peshawar and Nowshera. This effort will not only convert arid land into fertile grounds but also address water scarcity challenges for local farmers.

== Progress and future plans ==
As of June 2023, the project is in the construction phase, being supervised by Fazal Elahi, the Caretaker Minister for Irrigation. The project encompasses the refurbishment of the Warsak canal and the establishment of a new tunnel. The anticipated completion date for the project is set for February 2027.

The former Chief Minister of Khyber Pakhtunkhwa, Mahmood Khan, has communicated his wish for the updated project plan (referred to as PC-1) to be sanctioned during the forthcoming meeting of the executive committee of the National Economic Council.
