= Liaqat Khan Tarakai =

Pakistani politician

- لیاقت خان ترکئی
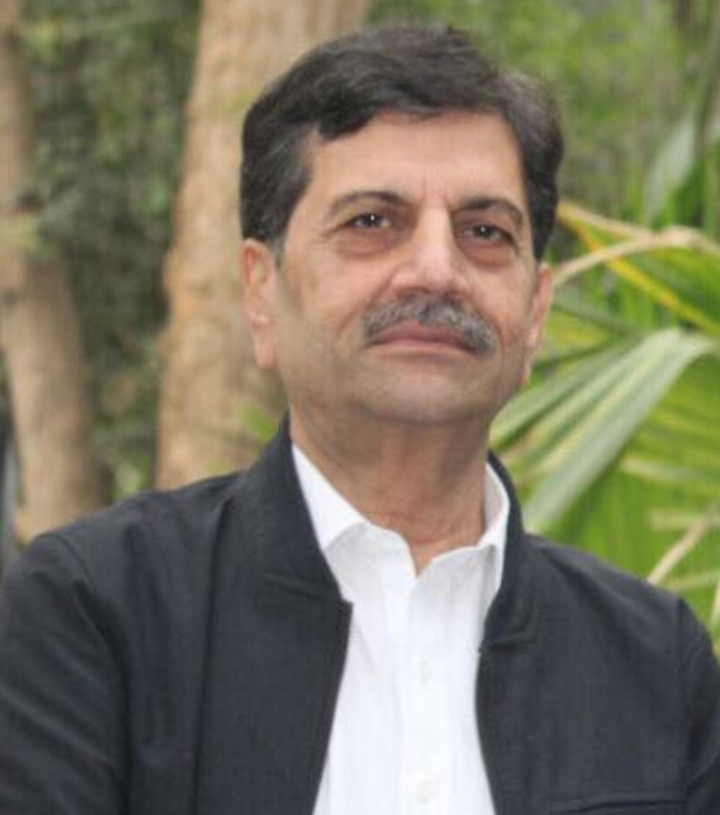

Member of the Senate of Pakistan
- In office March 2021 – March 2027
- In office March 2015 – March 2021

Managing Director Gloria Jean’s Coffees International
- Incumbent
- Assumed office March 2008

Managing Partner DHA Cogen.Ltd/AEI Energy International Houston USA
- Incumbent
- Assumed office August 2006

Chief Executive Officer Crowne Plaza Hotels & Resorts
- Incumbent
- Assumed office November 1999

Chief Executive Officer Japan Power
- Incumbent
- Assumed office April 1992

Personal details
- Party: PTI (2021-present)
- Children: Shahram Khan; Faisal Khan Tarakai; Jehangir Khan Tarakai
- Relatives: Usman Khan Tarakai (cousin); Mohammad Ali Tarakai (brother)

Liaqat Khan Tarakai (Urdu: لیاقت خان ترکئی) is a Pakistani businessman and politician who is serving his second term as Member of the Senate of Pakistan since March 2021, representing the Pakistan Tehreek-e-Insaf.

== Early life ==
Liaqat Khan Tarakai was born in Tarakai House of Razar Tehsil, Swabi district, Khyber Pakhtunkhwa.

== Political career ==
=== Assets Declaration ===
In his declaration of assets and liabilities to the Election Commission of Pakistan in March 2015, he declared only the total current value of his immoveable properties held within Pakistan, at Rs. 213 million (equivalent to Rs. 1.1 billion or US$3.9 million in 2021) without giving any further details or addresses and declared that he had no immoveable property outside Pakistan.

He declared his business capital within Pakistan as Rs. 107 million (equivalent to Rs. 540 million or US$1.9 million in 2021), one vehicle Rs. 3.4 million (equivalent to Rs. 17 million or US$62,000 in 2021), jewelry worth Rs. 3 million (equivalent to Rs. 15 million or US$55,000 in 2021), cash in hand Rs. 200,000 (equivalent to Rs. 1.0 million or US$3,600 in 2021), bank balance Rs. 11.043 million (equivalent to Rs. 56 million or US$200,000 in 2021), and furniture valued at Rs. 2 million (equivalent to Rs. 10 million or US$36,000 in 2021).

=== 2015 Senate Election ===
He was elected to the Senate of Pakistan as a candidate of the Pakistan Tehreek-e-Insaf in the 2015 Pakistani Senate election.

=== 2021 Senate Election ===
He was elected to the Senate of Pakistan as a candidate of the Pakistan Tehreek-e-Insaf in the 2021 Pakistani Senate election.

== ICIJ Offshore data leaks ==
On 12 May 2016, the International Consortium of Investigative Journalists revealed in offshore data leaks that Liaqat incorporated the offshore company Ambassador Overseas Limited in the British Virgin Islands in 1998 without Tarakai in his name. The offshore company is linked with the Pakistani company Imperial Cigarette Industries Pvt LTD, which is Tarakais main business. The News International sent questions to Liaqat and his son Shahram Khan, who received them but declined to comment.
