= Tarakai =

Pashtun tribe

Tarakai or Taraki (Pashto: تره کي) is a Ghilzai Pashtun tribe mainly found in the Ghazni province of Afghanistan with a large number of them now settled in Pakistan. They reside throughout Afghanistan such as in Ghazni, Kabul, Paktia, Herat, and Kandahar and in Pakistan where they are fouind in Quetta, Pishin, Zhob, Loralai, Duki, Sherani, and Swabi. The tribe is further extended into several major clans/tribes: BadinKhel, NaKhel, SaakKhel, FerozKhel, TaswelKhel, and GurbizKhel. These tribes are further divided into more sub-tribes within the above-mentioned clans/tribes. The Tarakai were one of the Pashtun tribes resettled across many areas under the rule of King Abdur Rahman Khan in the late 19th century. The first Communist leader of the Democratic Republic of Afghanistan, Nur Muhammad Taraki, was from the Taraki tribe.

== Notable people ==
- Nur Muhammad Tarakai, Afghan communist revolutionary who served as President of the Marxist-Leninist Democratic Republic of Afghanistan and led the Saur Revolution on the 28th of April 1978
- Shahram Khan Tarakai, served as Provincial Minister of Khyber Pakhtunkhwa
- Najeeb Tarakai, late Afghanistan cricketer died on 6 October 2020. Afghanistan national cricket team
