= PK-51 Swabi-III =

Pakistani electoral district

- Constituency for the Khyber Pakhtunkhwa Assembly
- Region: Swabi Tehsil (partly) and Lahore Tehsil (partly) of Swabi District

Current constituency
- Party: Pakistan Tehreek-e-Insaf
- Member(s): Abdul Karim
- Created from: PK-34 Swabi-IV (before 2018) PK-45 Swabi-III (2018–2022)

PK-51 Swabi-III (پی کے-51 صوابی-3) is a constituency for the Khyber Pakhtunkhwa Assembly of the Khyber Pakhtunkhwa province of Pakistan.

== See also ==
- PK-50 Swabi-II
- PK-52 Swabi-IV
