= PK-50 Swabi-II =

Pakistani electoral district

- Constituency for the Khyber Pakhtunkhwa Assembly
- Region: Swabi Tehsil (partly) including Swabi city of Swabi District

Current constituency
- Party: Pakistan Tehreek-e-Insaf
- Member(s): Aqibullah Khan
- Created from: PK-31 Swabi-I (2002-2018); PK-44 Swabi-II (2018-2022)

PK-50 Swabi-II (پی کے-50 صوابی-2) is a constituency for the Khyber Pakhtunkhwa Assembly of the Khyber Pakhtunkhwa province of Pakistan.

== See also ==
- PK-49 Swabi-I
- PK-51 Swabi-III
