= PK-52 Swabi-IV =

Pakistani electoral district

- Constituency for the Khyber Pakhtunkhwa Assembly
- Region: Razar Tehsil (partly) and Lahore Tehsil (partly) of Swabi District

Current constituency
- Party: Pakistan Tehreek-e-Insaf
- Member(s): Mohammad Ali Tarakai
- Created from: PK-33 Swabi-III (2002-2018); PK-46 Swabi-IV (2018-2023)

PK-52 Swabi-IV (پی کے-52 صوابی-4) is a constituency for the Khyber Pakhtunkhwa Assembly of the Khyber Pakhtunkhwa province of Pakistan.

== See also ==
- PK-51 Swabi-III
- PK-53 Swabi-V
