= PK-53 Swabi-V =

Pakistani electoral district

- Constituency for the Khyber Pakhtunkhwa Assembly
- Region: Razar Tehsil (partly) of Swabi District

Current constituency
- Party: Pakistan Tehreek-e-Insaf
- Member: Shahram Khan
- Created from: PK-32 Swabi-II (2002-2018); PK-47 Swabi-V (2018-2023)

PK-53 Swabi-V (پی کے-53 صوابی-5) is a constituency for the Khyber Pakhtunkhwa Assembly of the Khyber Pakhtunkhwa province of Pakistan.

== See also ==
- PK-52 Swabi-IV
- PK-54 Mardan-I
