= PK-49 Swabi-I =

Pakistani electoral district

- Constituency for the Khyber Pakhtunkhwa Assembly
- Region: Topi Tehsil of Swabi District

Current constituency
- Party: Pakistan Tehreek-e-Insaf
- Member(s): Rangez Ahmad
- Created from: PK-35 Swabi-V and PK-36 Swabi-VI (2002-2018); PK-43 Swabi-I (2018-2023)

PK-49 Swabi-I (پی کے-49 صوابی-1) is a constituency for the Khyber Pakhtunkhwa Assembly of the Khyber Pakhtunkhwa province of Pakistan.

== See also ==
- PK-48 Haripur-III
- PK-50 Swabi-II
