= Awami Jamhuri Ittehad Pakistan =

Pakistan political party

Awami Jamhuri Ittehad Pakistan عوامی جمهوری اتحاد
- Abbreviation: AJIP
- Chairman: Shahram Khan
- Founder: Liaqat Khan Tarakai
- Founded: 2012; 13 years ago
- Dissolved: 2015; 10 years ago
- Merged into: PTI
- Headquarters: Swabi, Khyber Pakhtunkhwa, Pakistan
- Ideology: Social democracy

Election symbol
- Cup and Saucer (2013 General Elections)

Party flag

Awami Jamhuri Ittehad Pakistan (Urdu: عوامی جمهوری اتحاد) was a political party in Swabi District, Khyber Pakhtunkhwa, Pakistan. This political party was established by Liaqat Khan Tarakai and was headed by his son Shahram Khan who merged it into Imran Khan's PTI.

Awami Jamhuri Ittehad Pakistan (AJIP) was founded by his father Liaqat Khan. He was the chairman of this party. It has since merged into Imran Khan's PTI.

== Electoral history ==
National Assembly
| Election | Votes | % | Seats | +/– |
|---|---|---|---|---|
| 2013 | 71,175 | 0.16% | 1 / 342 | ▲1 |

== See also ==
- Swabi Qaumi Mahaz
