= Shaidu =

Pakistani town

Coordinates: 33°59′N 72°11′E

Shaidu (Urdu: شيدو) is a town located in the Nowshera District of Khyber Pakhtunkhwa, Pakistan. With a population of approximately 75,000 the town is situated on the fertile alluvial plains of the Indus River. Shaidu serves as a key agricultural hub for the surrounding region. Positioned along the historic Grand Trunk Road, it has been influenced by various ruling forces throughout its history. The town is home to the Khattak tribe and is located on N-5 National Highway, connecting Jehangira to Adamzai and Chashmai to Mian Essa.

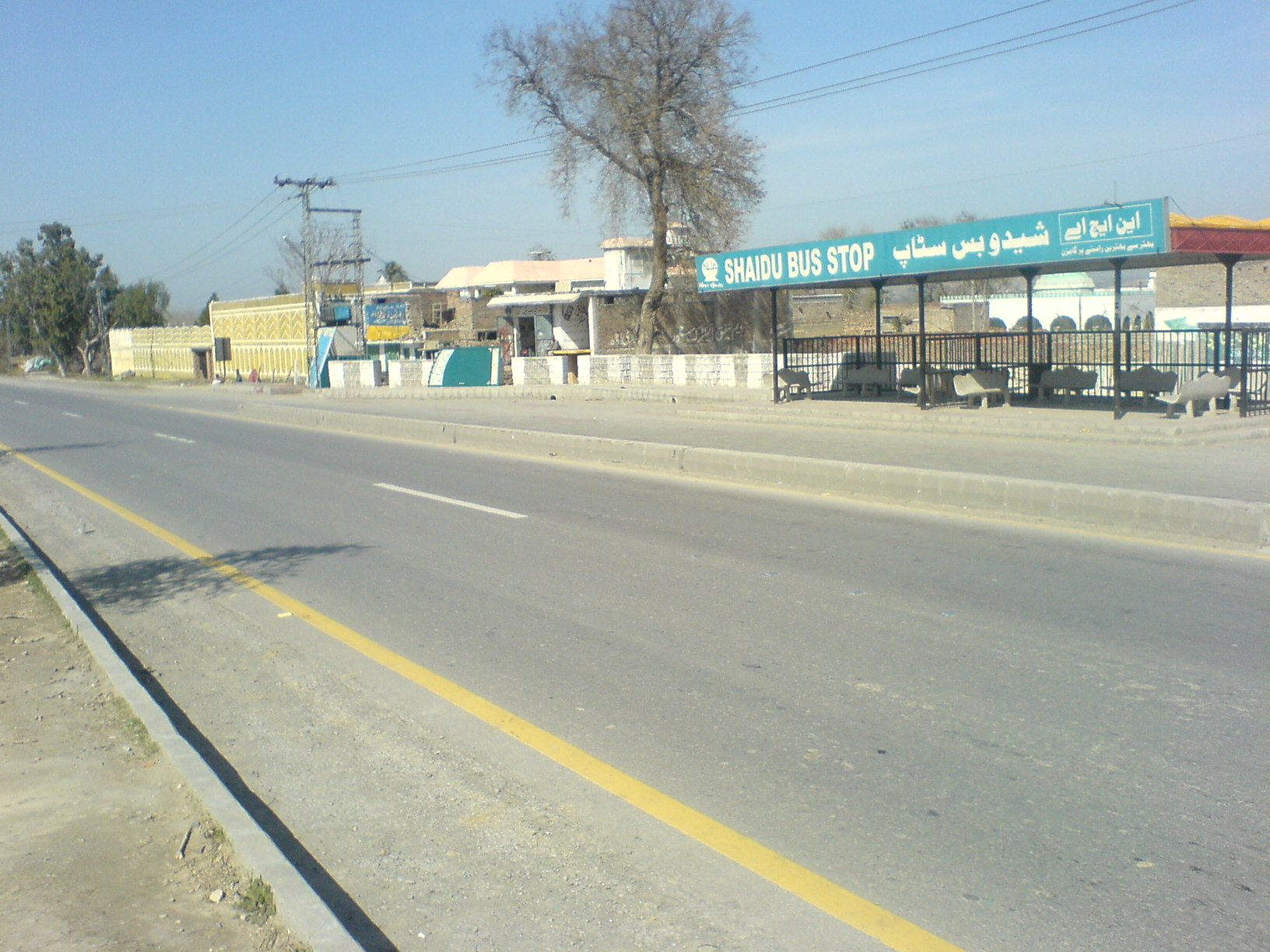
Bus stop, Shaidu

Shaidu is located approximately 100 km northwest of Pakistan's capital, Islamabad. The nearest town, Nowshera, lies about 24 km to the west, while the provincial capital, Peshawar, is roughly 50 km further west. To the east flows the Indus River, and to the south are the Khattak mountains. Shaidu is situated near the south bank of the River Kabul (لندي سيند) just before it converges with the Indus. The town is also accessible by rail, with a railway passing through it.

== History ==
=== Harappan civilization ===
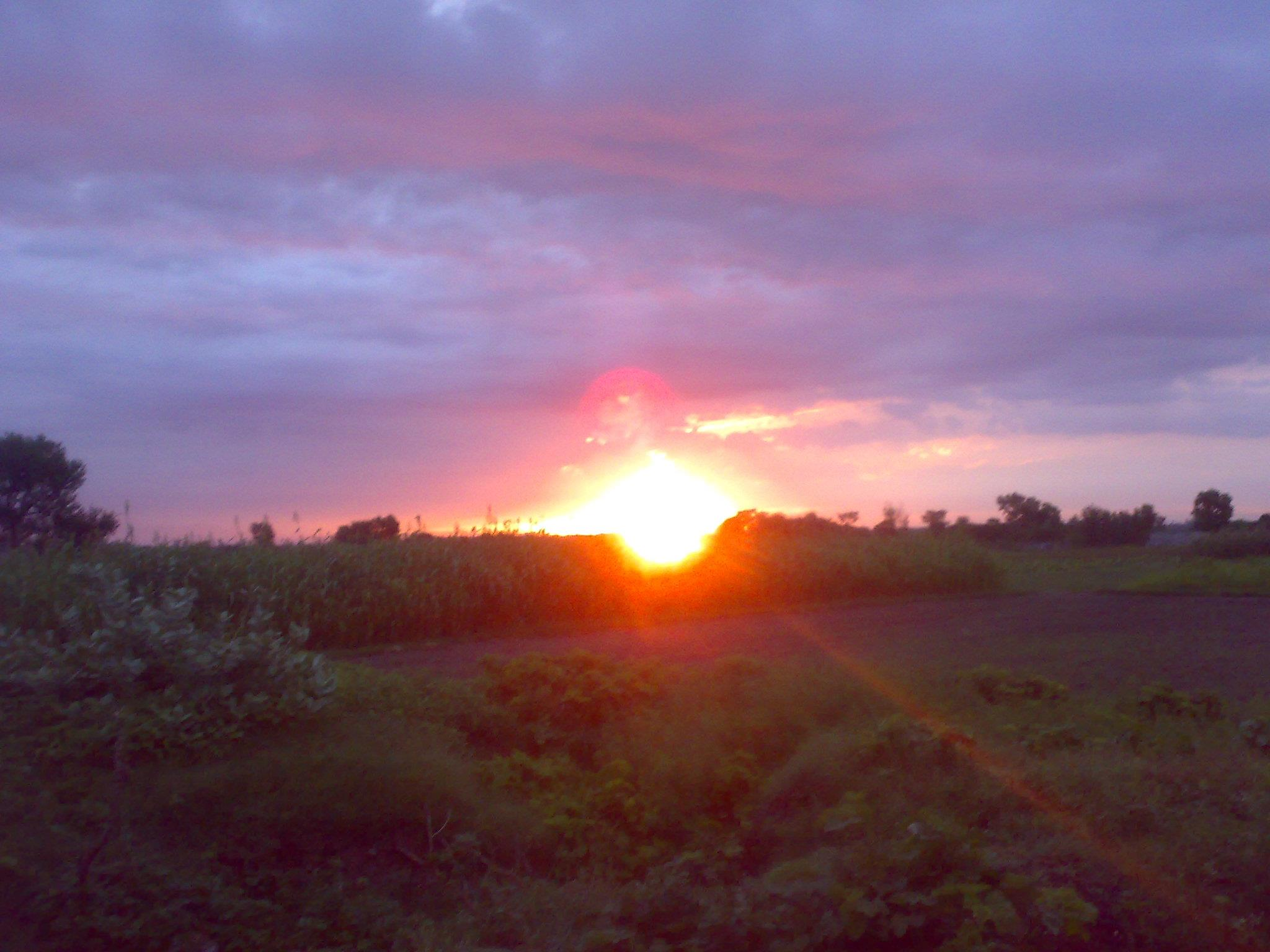
Sunrise, Shaidu

Shaidu lies within the Indus Valley where men have lived since 3000 BCE. Shaidu lies approximately 500 km northwest of the archeological site at Harappa, where finds indicate a flourishing Indus valley civilization lasting from 2600 BCE to 1900 BCE. Theories as to the end of the Harappan civilisation include drought, invasion, epidemic illness and comet impact. After the decline of the Harappan civilisation, communities became smaller and more rural. However, the area of the Khyber Pakhtunkhwa became a centre for trade, culture, language and a route for eastward migration especially of the Indo-Aryan peoples.

=== Introduction of Buddhism ===
The Buddhist based Kushan Empire (30 CE – 375 CE) made Purushapura (now Peshawar) one of their capitals.

=== Introduction of Hinduism ===
As the Kushan empire fractured and declined, the Indus Valley became a suzerainty of the Gupta Empire (319 CE – 605 CE) which brought Hinduism and relative peace to the valley. This peace in the northern Indus Valley, including Shaidu, was broken by an invasion of White Huns who were repelled in 455 CE. One of the feudal dynasties of the Peshawar district of the 6th century and on were the Shahiya.

=== Introduction of Islam ===
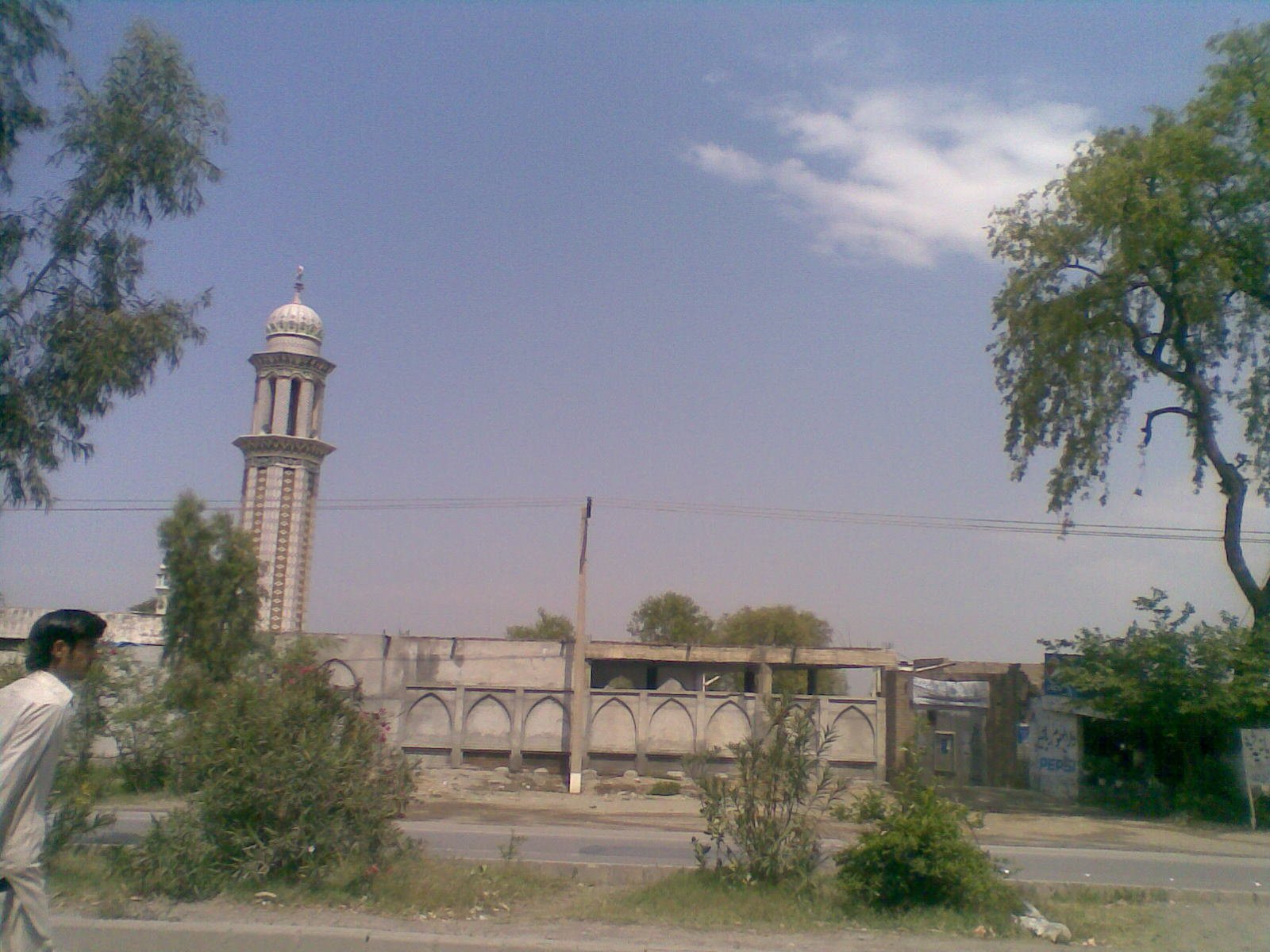
Darul uloom e Rabbani, Shaidu

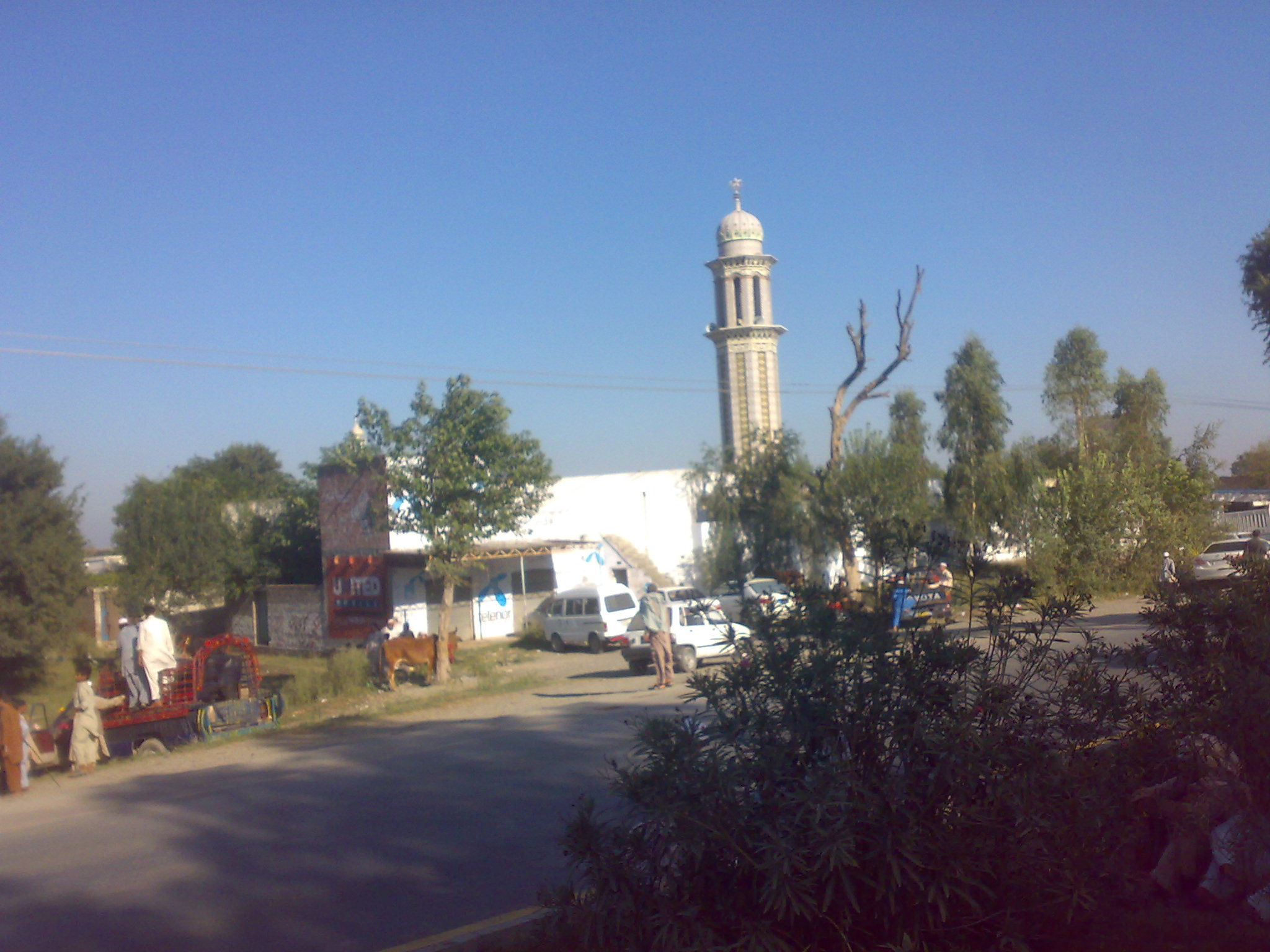
Rabbani

In 1001 CE, the Shahiya ruler, Jaipala, was defeated at the Battle of Peshawar by Mahmud of Ghazni (971 – 1030 CE). Mahmud of Ghanzi, a member of the Ghaznavid dynasty, brought Islam to the region.

A succession of Islamic leaders held the Indus Valley from the 1st to 8th centuries CE. Between 1173 and 1186, Muhammad of Ghor invaded and took power in Peshawar and Lahore. The population was forced to convert to Islam. His rule lasted till his assassination in 1206. Following rulers included the Lodi (1451 – 1526) and the Mughal (1526 – 1857). In the 17th century, local traditional tribesmen, such as the khattaks, rebelled against the foreign ruling forces.

=== Battle of Shaidu ===
In the early 18th century, as the Mughal Empire declined, a new empire, the Durrani Empire was formed in the Indus valley from a union of territories. However, in the late 18th century and early 19th century, a number of battles between the Durranis and Afghan Pashtun tribes ensued.

Syed Ahmad (1786 – 1831) was a radical Sunni Islamist from northern India. After rallying followers, militia, funds and the credibility from two trips to Mecca, Syed Ahmad went to the Peshawar valley as Imam, intending to make the valley a base from which to destroy the Sikh Empire and defend against the British Raj.

In 1827, Syed Ahmad met with the leaders of the Durranis, two brothers named Yar Muhammad Khan and Pir Muhammad Khan. The Durranis initially pled allegiance to Syed Ahmed. Legend holds that on the evening of 24 February 1827, the brothers turned and had the cook poison Syed Ahmad and the Durranis thence forth refused to fight.

On 25 February 1827, Syed Ahmad's forces and the mujahidin moved towards Shaidu where the forces of the Sikh leader, Budh Singh were encamped. On the battle field, the Sikh forces prevailed but Syed Ahmad escaped. The battle field may have been at what is now the Shaidu old cemetery.

=== British rule ===
By the mid 19th century, the Sikh empire was in decline. On 29 March 1849, the British East India Company militia took control of the Peshawar valley with an army of overwhelming force. The British left on 14 August 1947 at Partition leaving Shaidu in the Islamic Republic of Pakistan.

== Geography ==
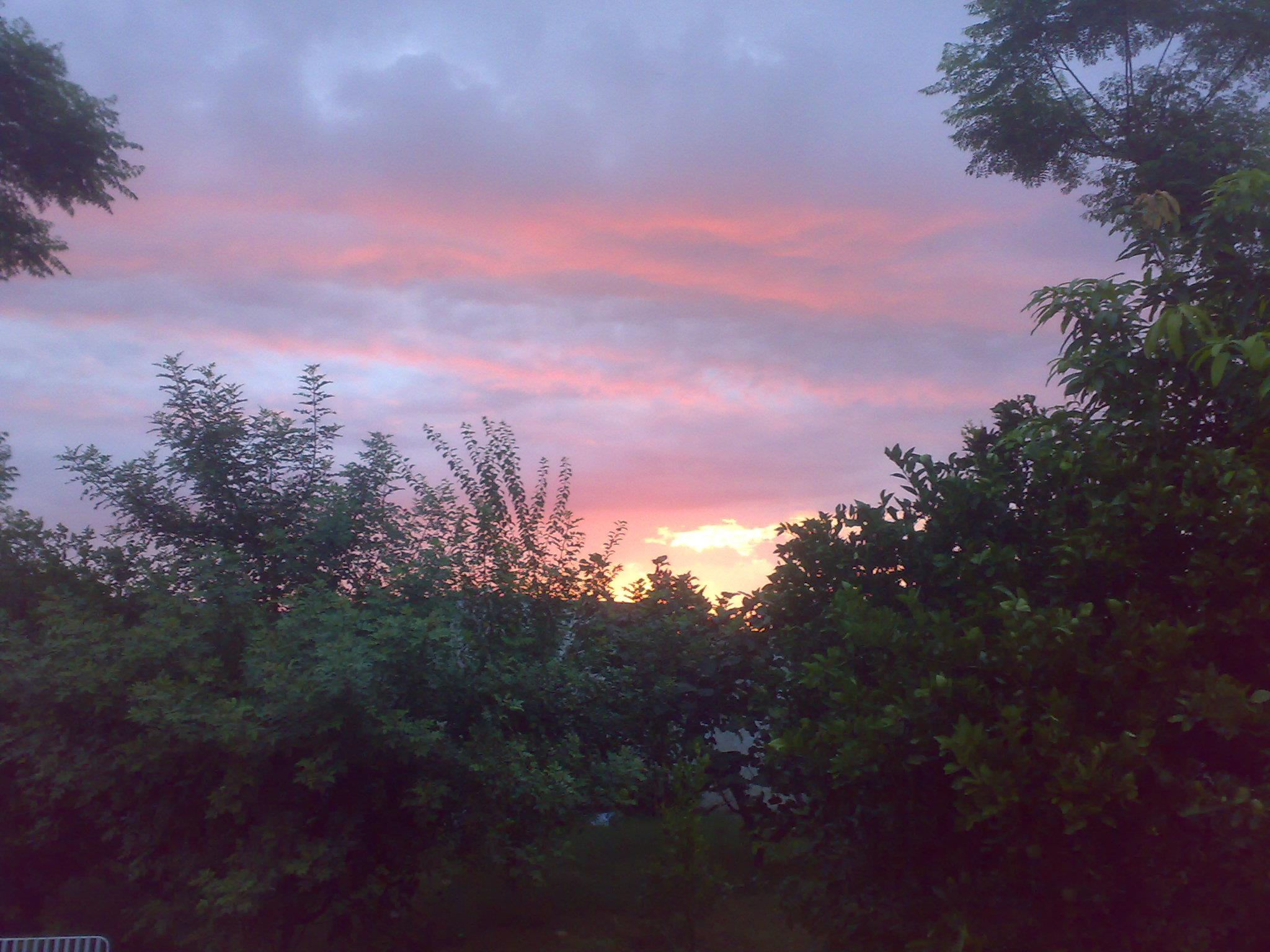
Sunrise, Shaidu

Shaidu's elevation above sea level is 276 m. Shaidu lies on the gravel and silt alluvial plain of the Indus River with at least 300 m of rock below. The area is prone to catastrophic flooding from the Indus River and earthquakes related to the movement of the Asian and Indian tectonic plates.

Shaidu's river water source relies on meltwater from the glaciers of the Hindu Kush, Hindu Raj and Himalayas. Agriculture depends on irrigation from streams as rainfall is inconsistent. In the late 19th century, the British created a new irrigation system beside those of ancient days.

Shaidu's climate is semi-arid to sub-humid, subtropical continental. The average annual rainfall is 550 mm per annum. The Peshawar valley has summer average maximum temperatures occurring in June, rising to 40 degrees Celsius. The minimum winter average temperatures occur in January, falling to 6 degrees Celsius. Rainy days are infrequent and unpredictable, occurring one to six days per month.

== Agriculture ==
=== Crops ===
Shaidu is a centre for local farmers. Subsistence farming provides food for families. Land ownership is up to 4 acres per farmer. Crops for sale include maize, barley, wheat, corn millet, and cotton, rape seed, sugar cane, sugar beet, okra, fruits and vegetables such as tomatoes, potatoes and onions, legumes, and tobacco. Irrigation is from canals, tube wells and rainfall. Irrigation canals may carry waste water or fresh water. The waste water carries a risk of heavy metals contamination with zinc and manganese. Water for crops is moderately saline. In Charsadda, approximately 50 km from Shaidu, a crop of opium poppies was found and destroyed. Acacia is grown for firewood.

== Gallery ==
Mela, Shaidu, 7 November 2011.

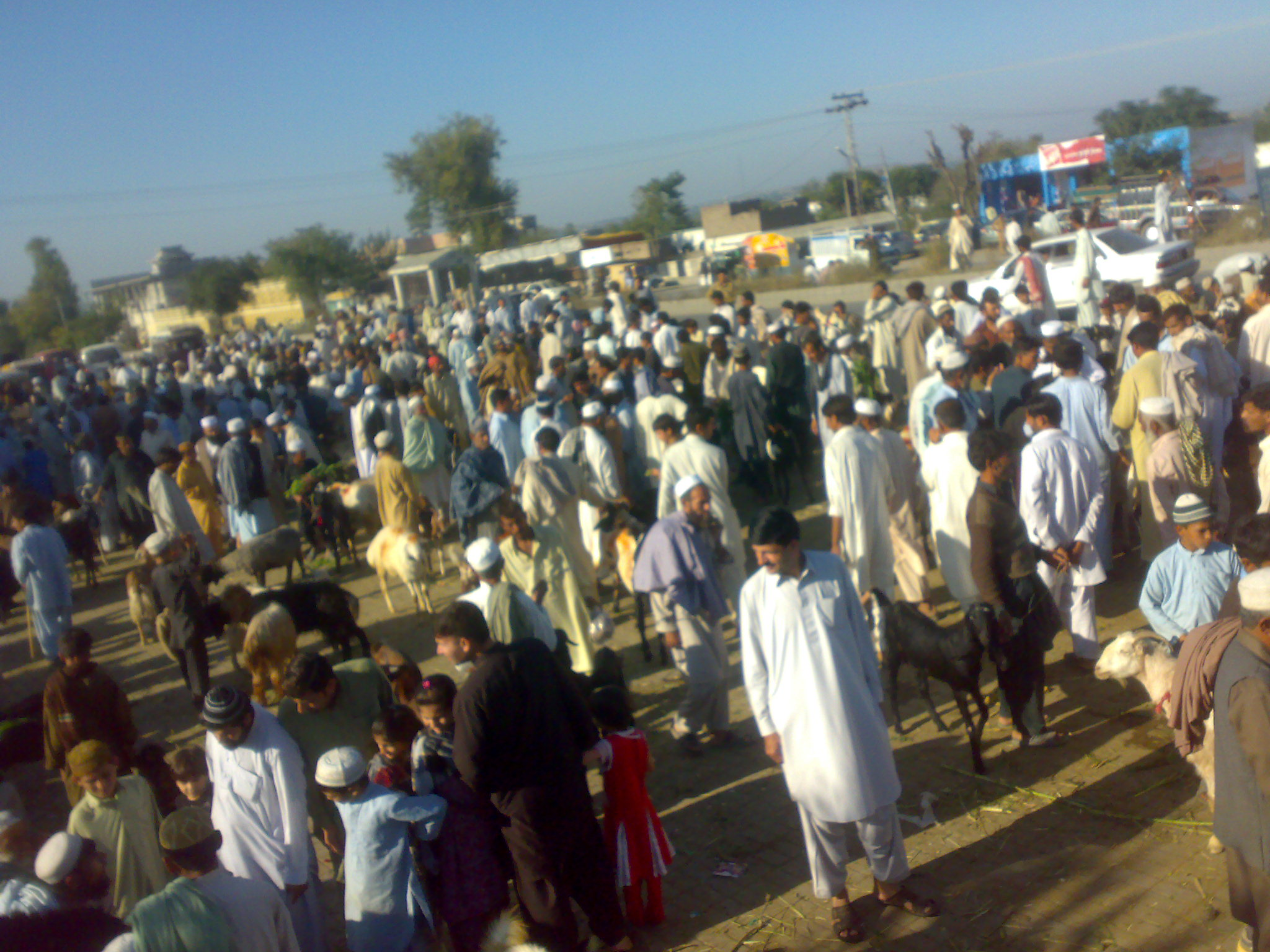

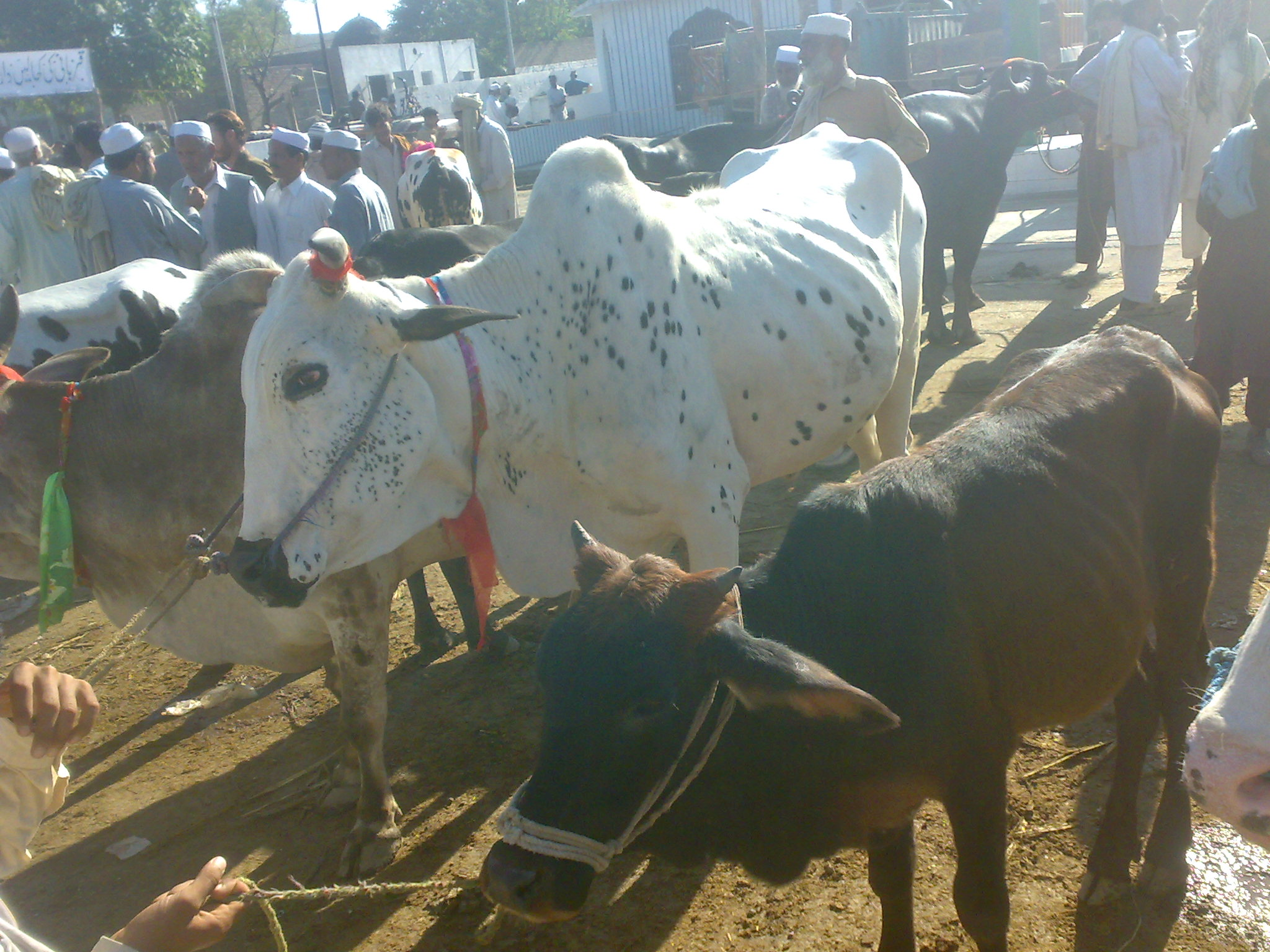

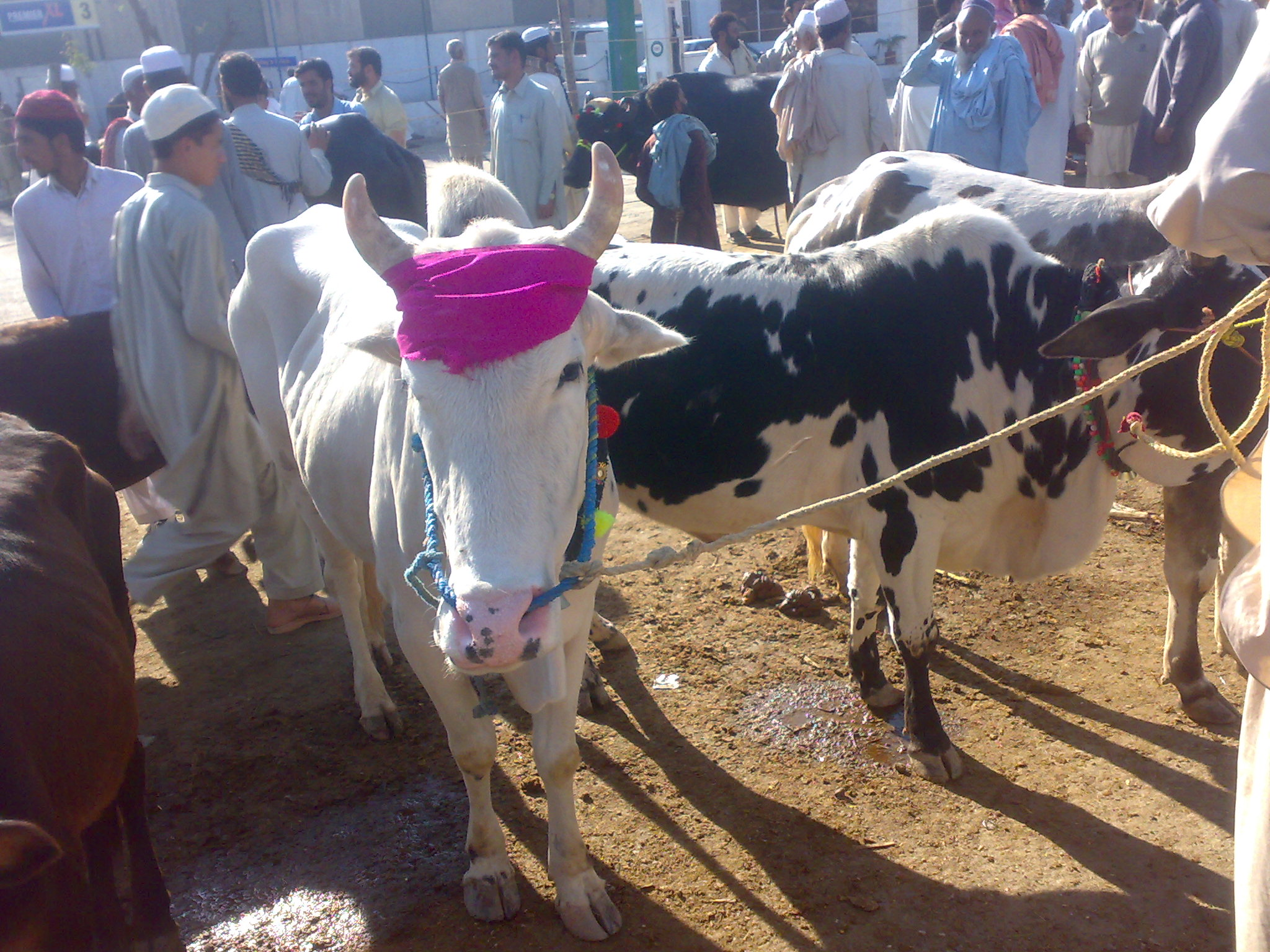

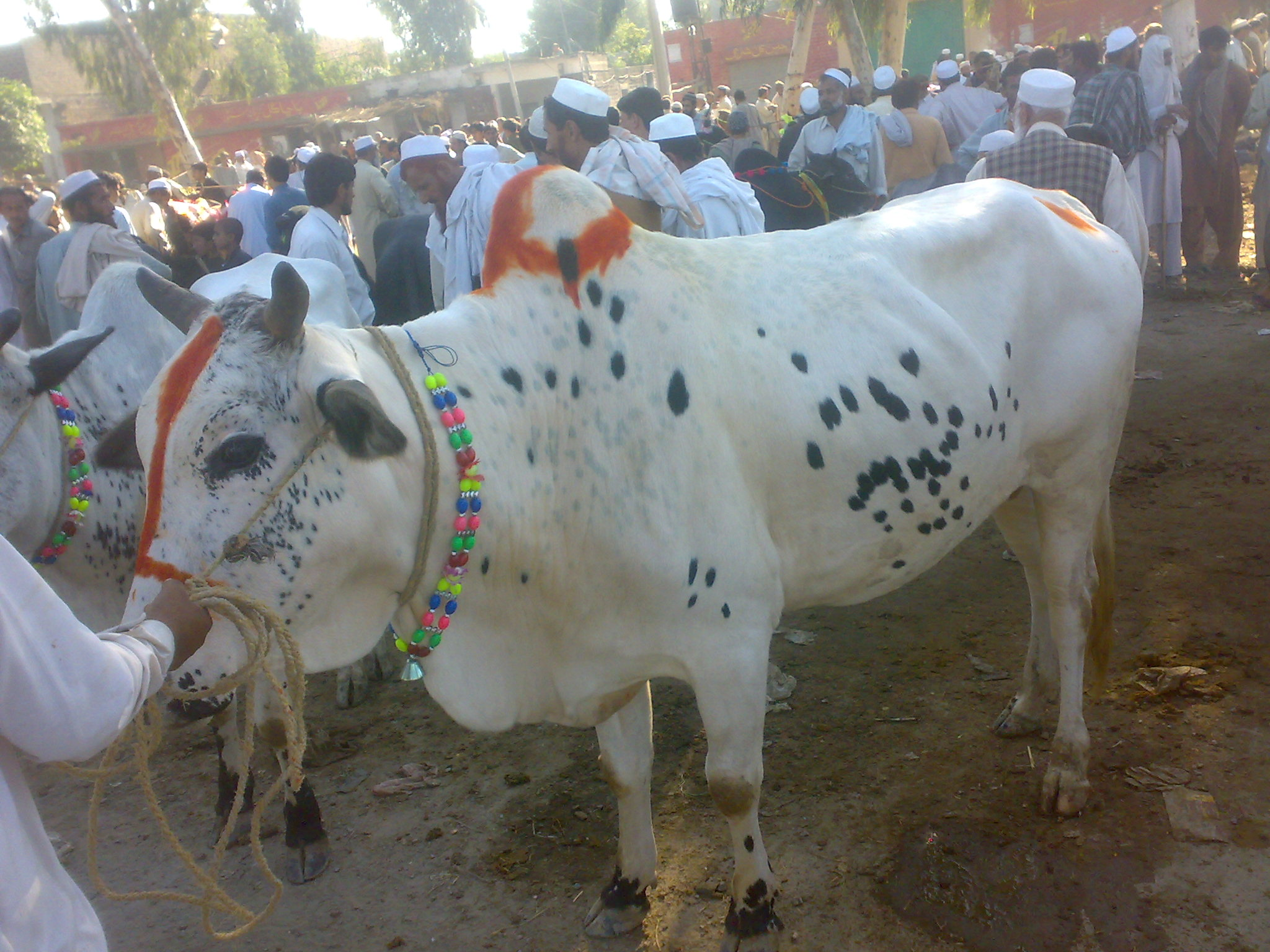

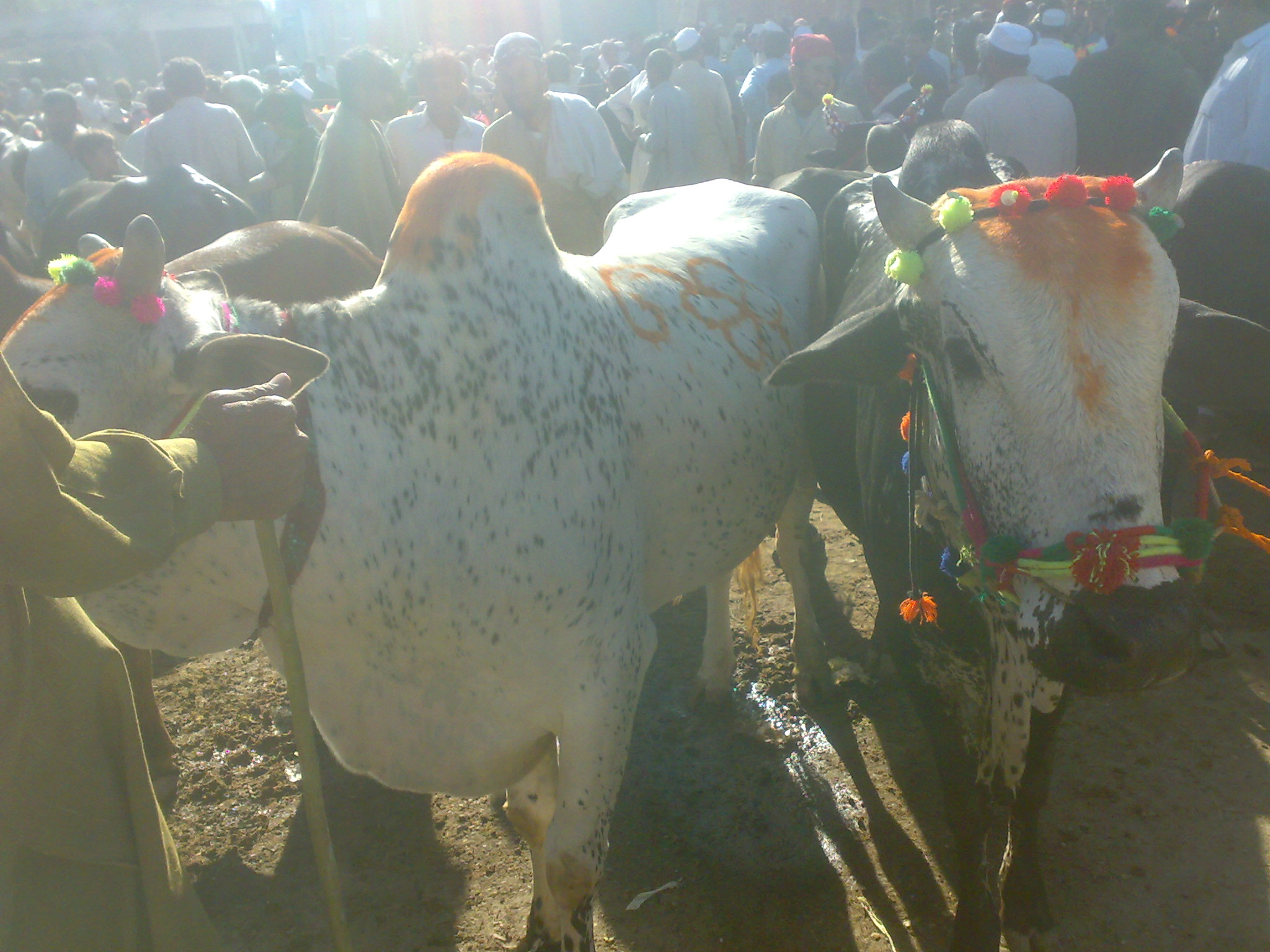
