= Shahsawar Khan =

Pakistani Pashto musician and singer

Shahsawar Khan شاه سوار خان
- Born: Shahsawar Khan; Jalbai, Swabi district, Khyber Pakhtunkhwa, Pakistan
- Origin: Peshawar, Khyber Pakhtunkhwa, Pakistan
- Genres: Pop
- Occupation(s): Singer musician

Shahsawar Khan (Pashto: شاه سوار خان; born 6 January 1993) better known Shahsawar is a Pakistani popular Pashto musician and singer born in Swabi then shifted with family to Karachi, Pakistan. He started interest in singing at the age of 13 and after 4 years of learning he started his career in music. He got his inspiration from Raheem Shah.

== Sexual assault charges ==
On 12 April 2017 Shahsawar Khan got arrested by KPK Police over alleged rape with a girl from Mardan and sent him to jail on judicial remand for 14 days. While the court also sent the woman to the Darul Aman and directed the police to conduct medical report of the prosecutor.
