= Adamzai =

Village in Khyber Pakhtunkhwa, Pakistan

Coordinates: 33.9844°N 72.1609°E

Adamzai is a village in Nowshera District, Khyber Pakhtunkhwa province, Pakistan, located between Akora Khattak and Shaidu. Khan's living here belong to the khushal khan khattak lineage of the khattak tribe. The tomb of Great Afghan Warrior and pashto poet Khushal Khan Khattak is situated in the outskirts of adamzai.

The British Company Pakistan Tobacco Company is situated in Adamzai along sheet glass factory (not operating). UNISA Pharmaceutical industry, Asif Motor Show Room & Best Marble Factory are still operational industries of Adamzai.

Adamzai is the home town of Senator Nauman Wazir Khattak, chairman area board WAPDA. There is only one government High school now upgraded to higher secondary school in 2019 by MPA Idress Khattak for Boys and just a middle school for girls which is also upgraded to High School. One Primary School is also present which is over populated which need of an additional primary school for children. These schools are operational from the last five decades. Now there is need of more government schools for boys and girls.

There is a government hospital operating from 1995.
