= Jalbai =

- Village
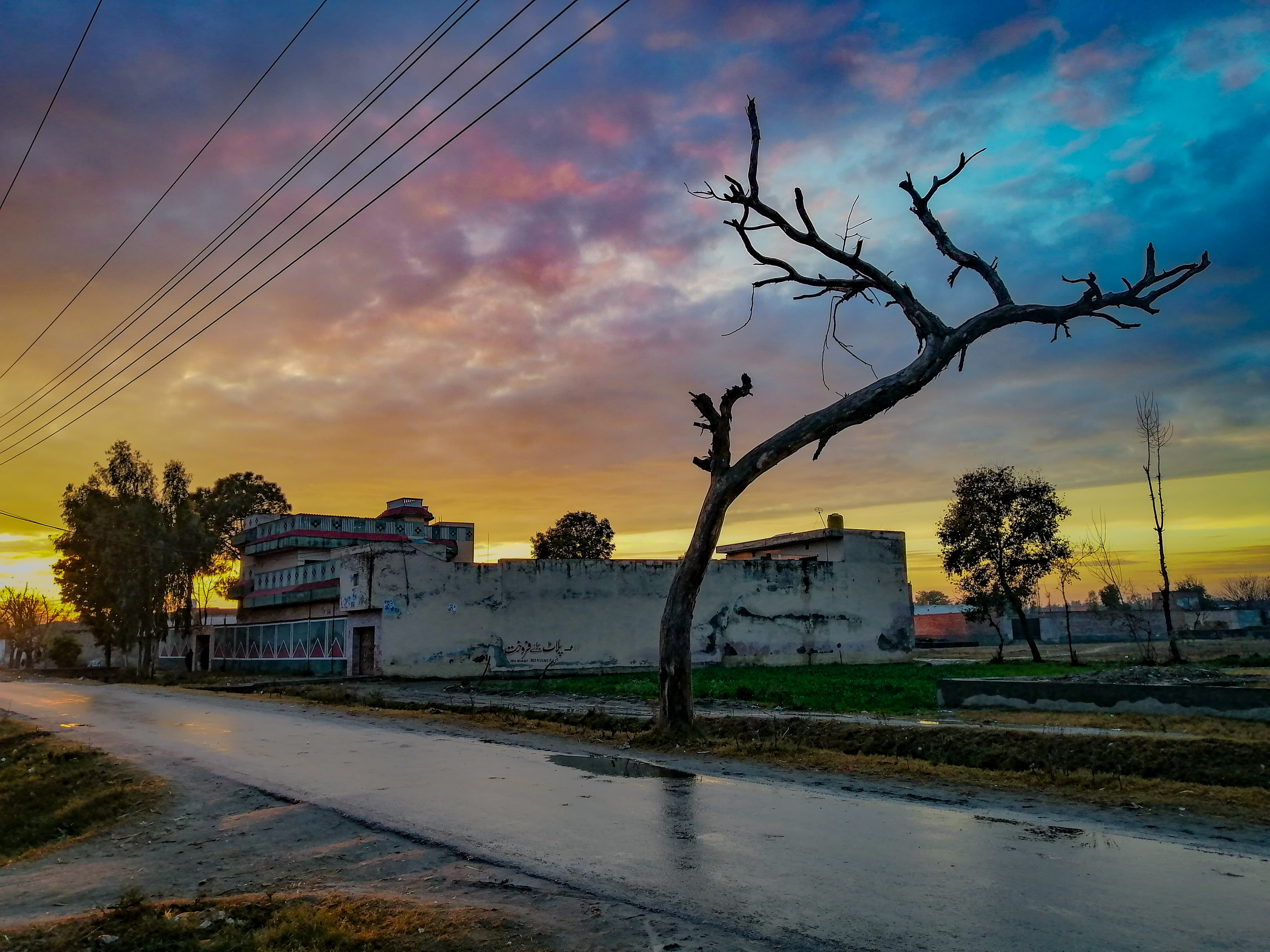
- Interactive map of Jalbai
- Coordinates: 34.0121°N 72.2689°E
- Country: Pakistan
- Province: Khyber Pakhtunkhwa
- Division: Mardan
- District: Swabi
- Tehsil: Lahor

Area
  - Total: 44.79 km^{2} (17.29 sq mi)
- Elevation: 317 m (1,040 ft)

Population (2017)
  - Total: 37,479
  - Density: 836.8/km^{2} (2,167/sq mi)
- Demonym: Jalbiwal
- Time zone: UTC+5:00 (PST)
- Postal Code: 23600
- Area code: 0938
- Language: Pashto

Jalbai is a village of Lahor Tehsil in Swabi District of Khyber Pakhtunkhwa, Pakistan, with a population of over 40 thousand in the 2017 census. Jalbai is primarily populated by Pashtuns, who comprise the second-largest ethnic group in the country.

The main industry of the village is agriculture, including wheat and tobacco. The literacy rate is 85 percent.

== Etymology ==
Jalbai is named after its position as "Jail B" during British rule.

== Geography ==
=== Topography ===
Jalbai is located in Tehsil Lahor of District Swabi, bordered by Tordher in south, Mardan District in north, Mian Eisa (Nowshera District) in west, Manki in east, Jalsai in northeast and Jehangira in southwest.

=== Climate ===
With an influence from the local steppe climate, Jalbai features a hot semi-arid climate (Köppen BSh), with very hot, prolonged summers and brief, mild to cool winters. Winter in Jalbai starts in November and ends in late March, though it sometimes extends into mid-April, while the summer months are from mid-May to mid-September. The mean maximum summer temperature surpasses 40 °C (104 °F) during the hottest month, and the mean minimum temperature is 25 °C (77 °F). The mean minimum temperature during the coolest month is 4 °C (39 °F), while the maximum is 18.3 °C (64.9 °F).

June is the hottest month of the year with an average temperature of 32.9 °C (91.2 °F). January is the coldest month with an average temperature of 10.2 °C (50.4 °F).

== Demographics ==
=== Population ===
The population of Jalbai in 2017 was 37,479. The male population was 19,103 (50.96%), while the female population was 18,375 (49.02%). The literacy rate was 85%.

=== Language ===
The primary native language spoken in Jalbai is Pashto, while Urdu is the native minority language, though English is used in educational institutions, while Urdu is understood throughout the village – as the national language of the country.

=== Religion ===
The overwhelming majority of residents of Jalbai follows and professes the Sunni Islam.

== Education ==
Numerous educational institutes – schools are in Jalbai.

Following are some of the notable educational institutes:

- Government High School Jalbai
- Government Higher Secondary School for Girls
- Al Noor Public School
- Jalbai Public School
- AR Rehman Public School

== Economy ==
Approximately 50% of the economy depends on agriculture.

=== Agriculture ===
Wheat, peanuts, maize, sugarcane and tobacco play an important role in Jalbai's economy by generating income and employment in farming. Jalbai is also famous for Guava fruit.

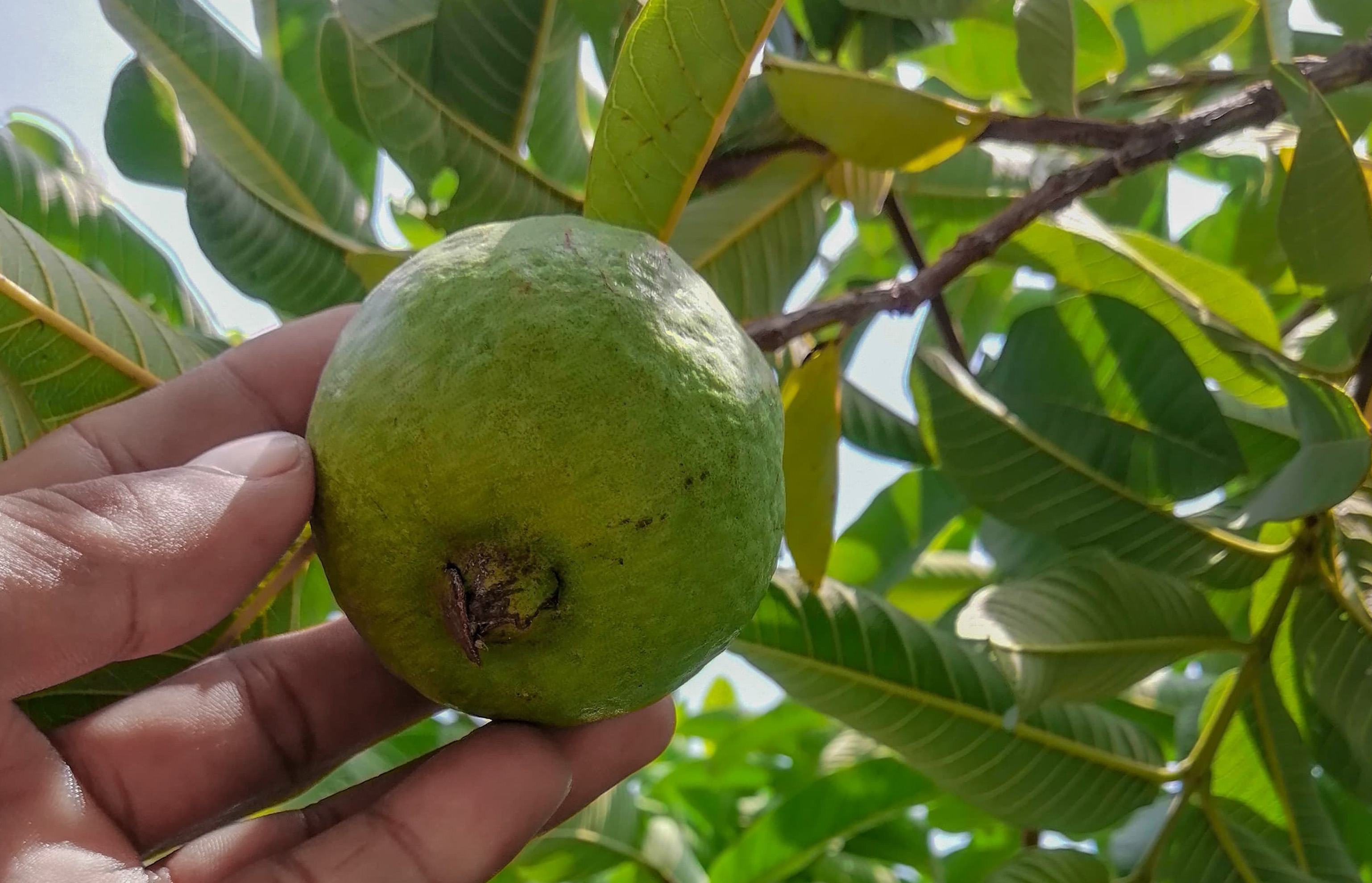
Guava of Jalbai

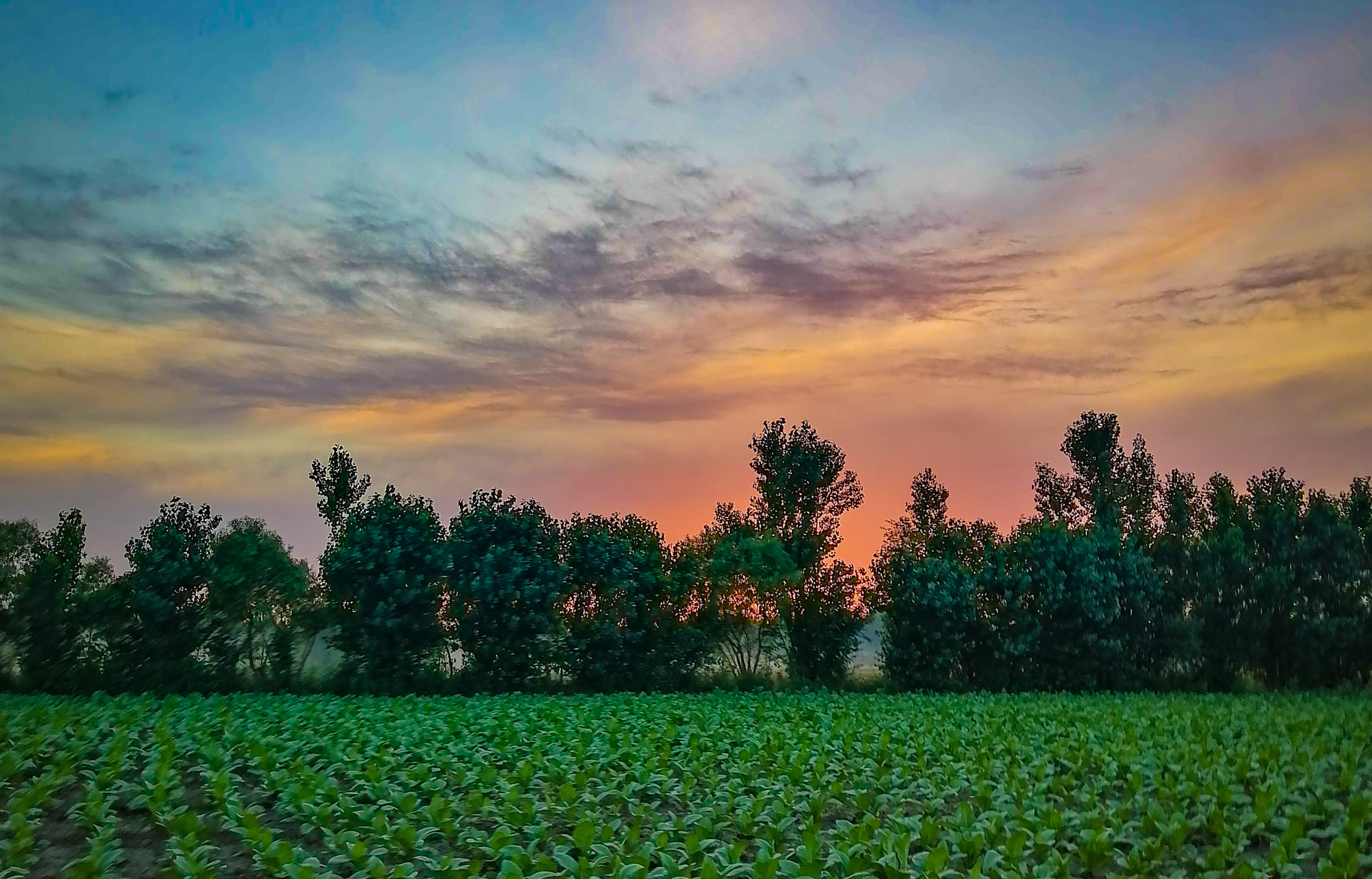
tobacco farm at Jalbai

=== Mining ===
Sand mining is a significant source of income and employment for a substantial number of people in Jalbai.

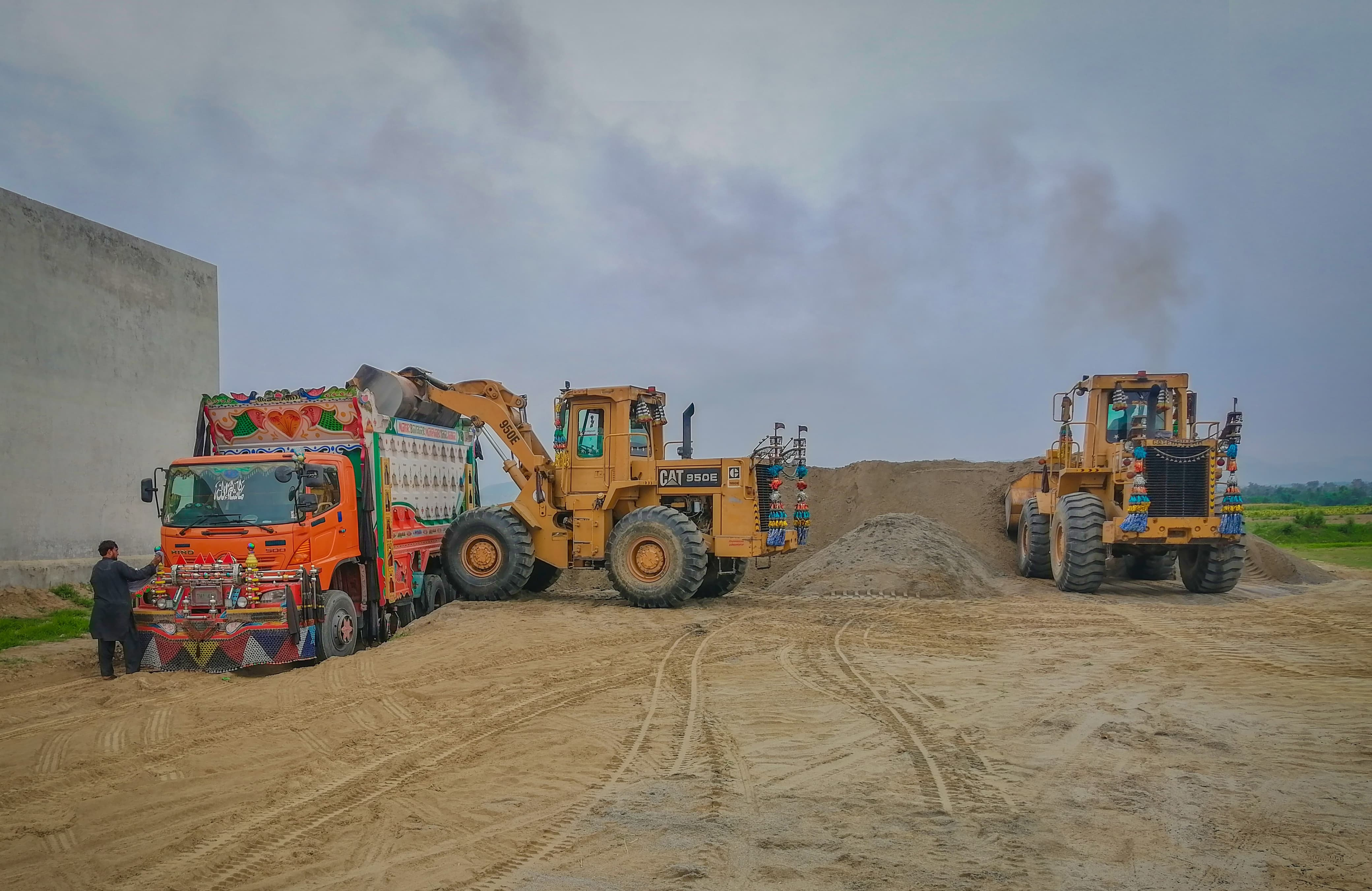
Sand Mining at Jalbai

== Transportation ==
=== Road ===
Jalbai main road that connects Jalbai to Tordher, while the M-1 Motorway provides an alternate route to Peshawar and Islamabad. The Jalbai Mera Lar also provides access to the Swat Motorway also known as the M-16 or Swat Expressway.

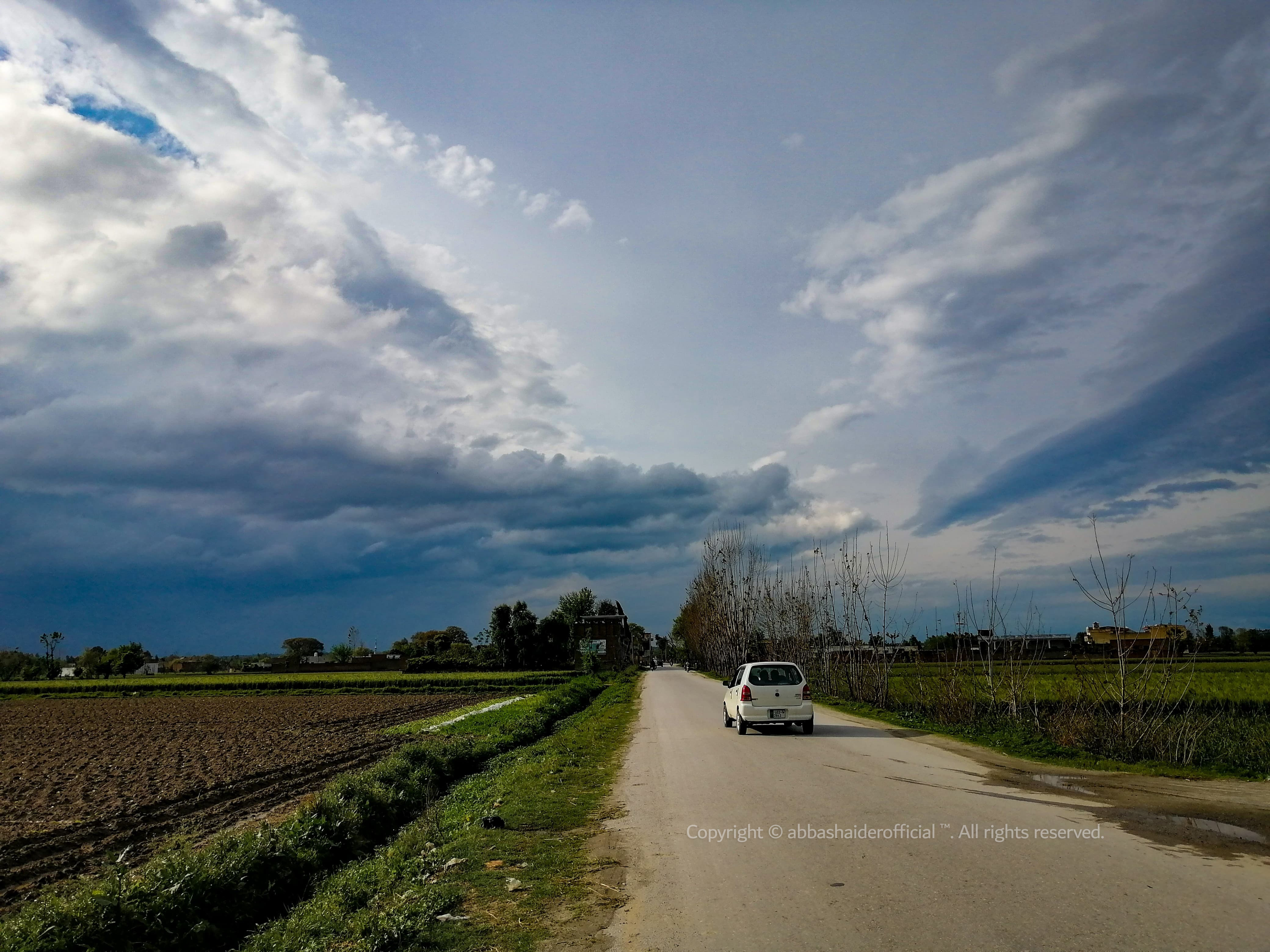
Jalbai Main Road (Tordher to Jalbai)

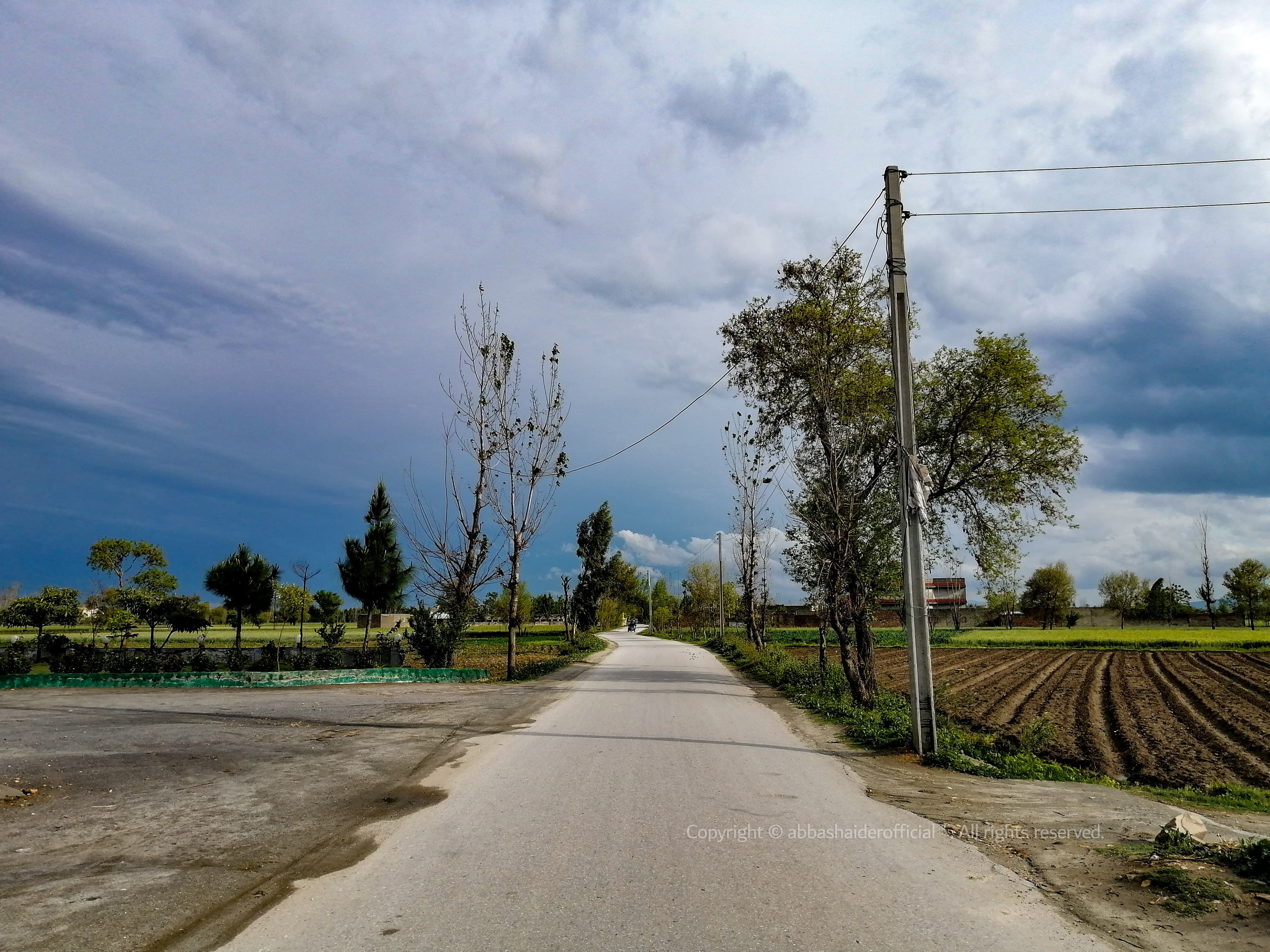
Jalbai Main Road (Jalbai to Tordher)

=== Motorways ===
Jalbai is connected to Islamabad and Peshawar by the 155-kilometer-long M-1 Motorway. The motorway also links Jalbai to major cities in the province, such as Charsadda and Mardan. The M-1 motorway continues onwards to Lahore as part of the M-2 motorway.

Interchange connecting near Jalbai on M1 that intersects M1 with the origin of M16 heading towards Swat valley, also known as Karnal Sher Khan Interchange.

== Administration ==
The village of Jalbai contains three Union Councils, Jalbai Mera and Jalbai (East and West); each Union is administered by its own nazim.

== Landmarks ==
- General

Jalbai Rest House – a well known place, and travel destination.

- Mosques

Bhai Masjid Jalbai – village's old mosque

== Sports ==
Cricket is the most popular sport in Jalbai with School Ground Jalbai is the main ground. There is also small cricket and football grounds.

- Cricket
  JSL Jalbian Super League, The Jalbian Super League also known as the JSL is a men's cricket league contested by six franchise teams, founded in 2024 by Jalbian Youth.
1. Jalbian Fighters
2. Jalbian Kings
3. Jalbian Shaheens
4. Jalbian Stars
5. Jalbian Tigers
6. Jalbian Warriors

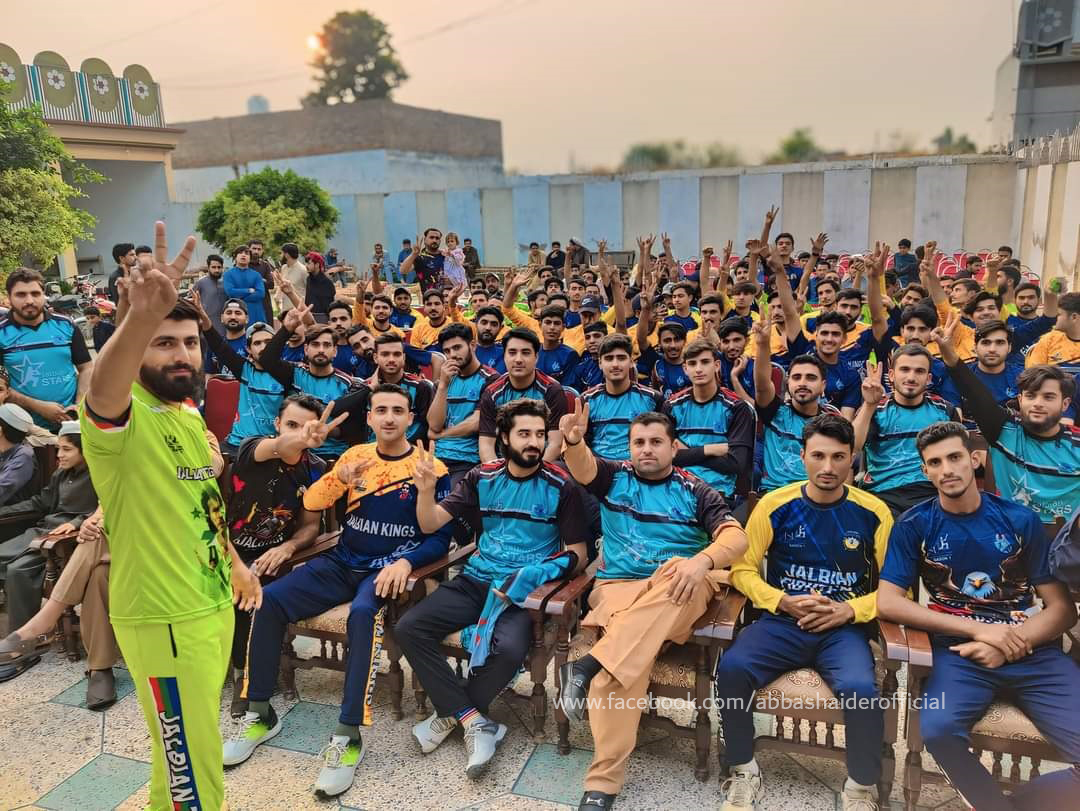
JSL Opening Ceremony

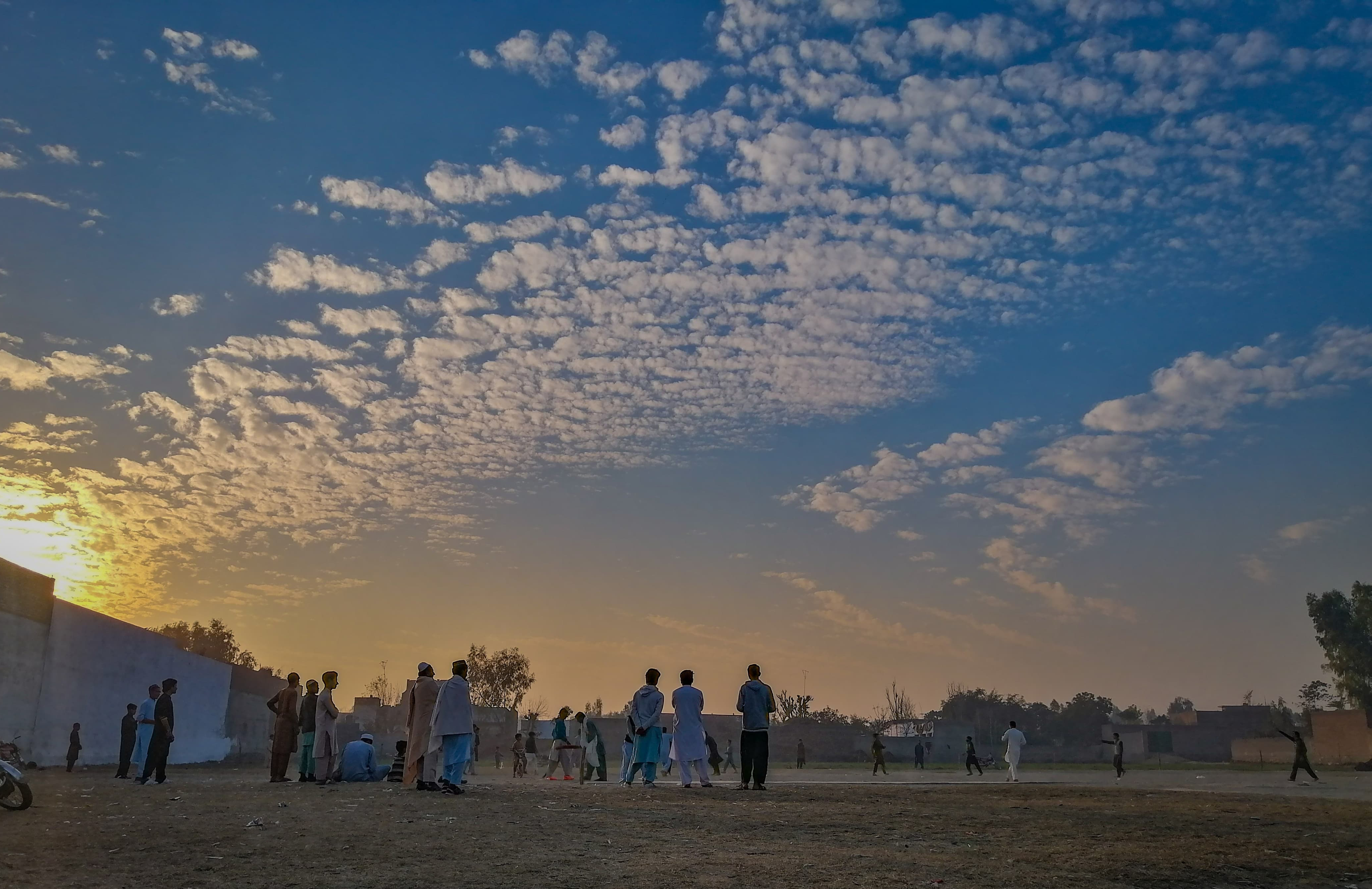
School Ground Jalbai

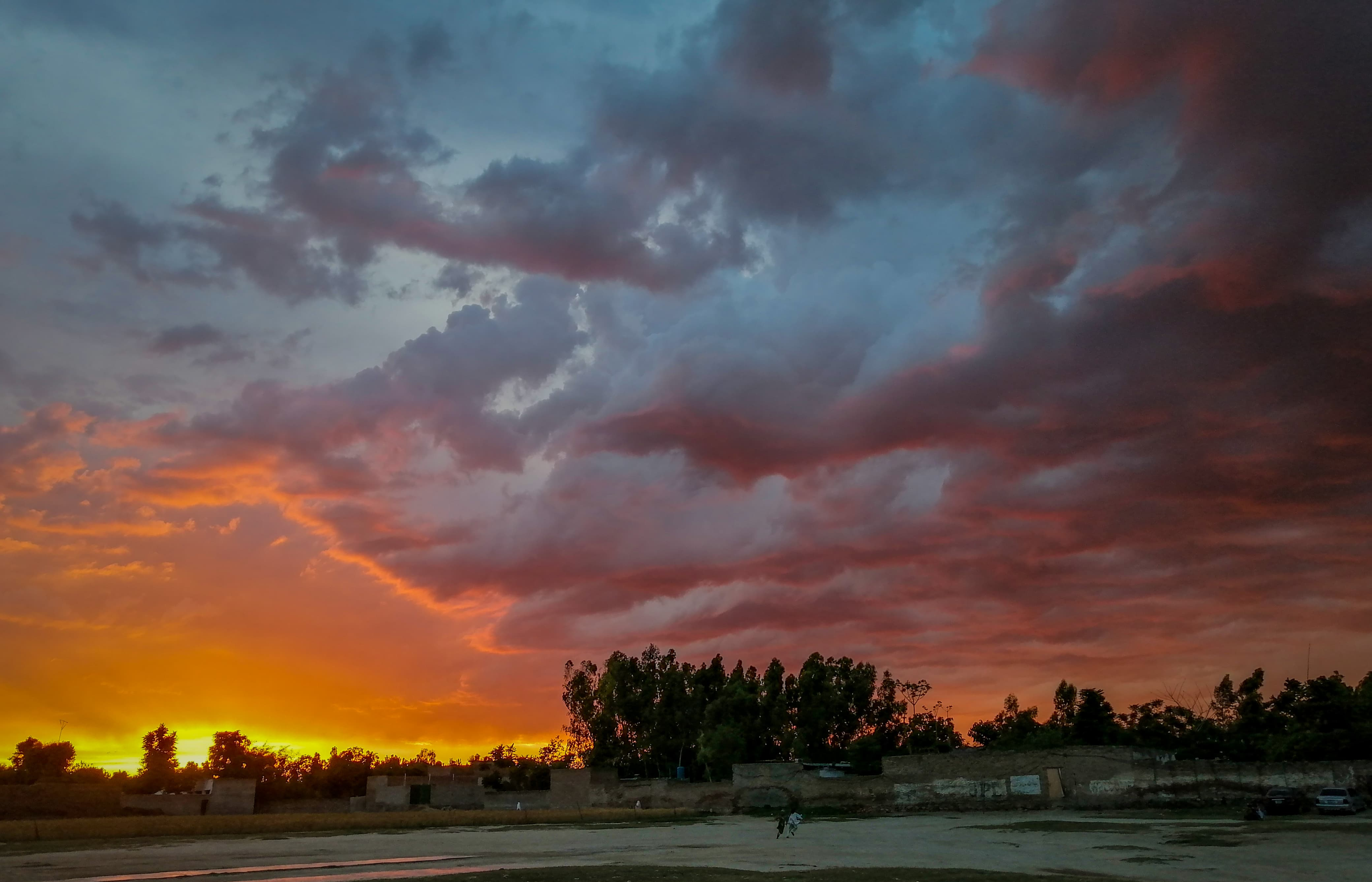
School Ground Jalbai Swabi

== Cuisine ==
Rice dishes and kebabs feature prominently in cuisine. Meat is eaten more often in cuisine than any other cuisines. Kabuli palaw, Bannu Pulao, Chapli kabab, tika, and mutton karahi are the most famous dishes of the region.

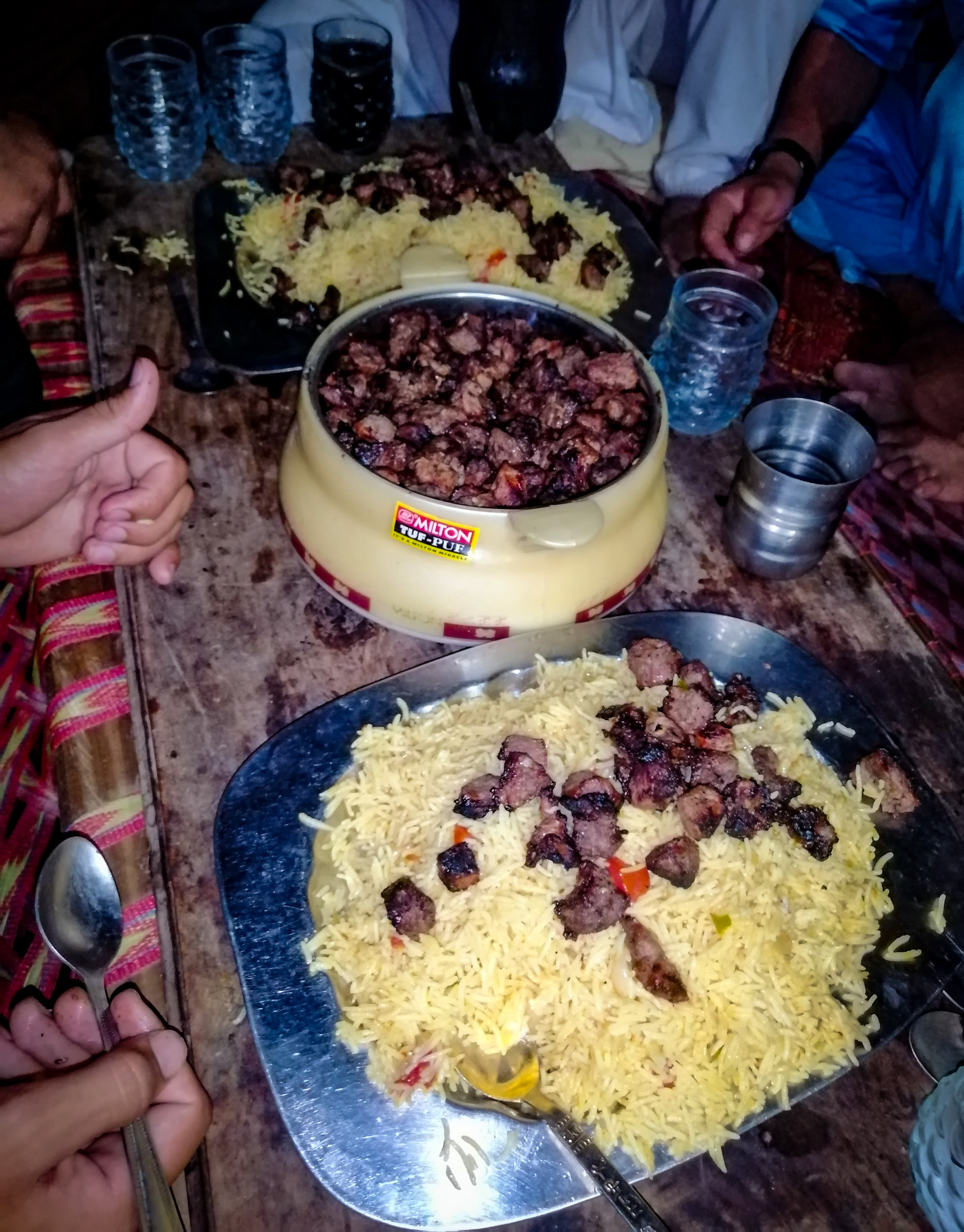
