= Maini =

Coordinates: 34°7′0″N 72°37′0″E

Maini مینئ
- Village
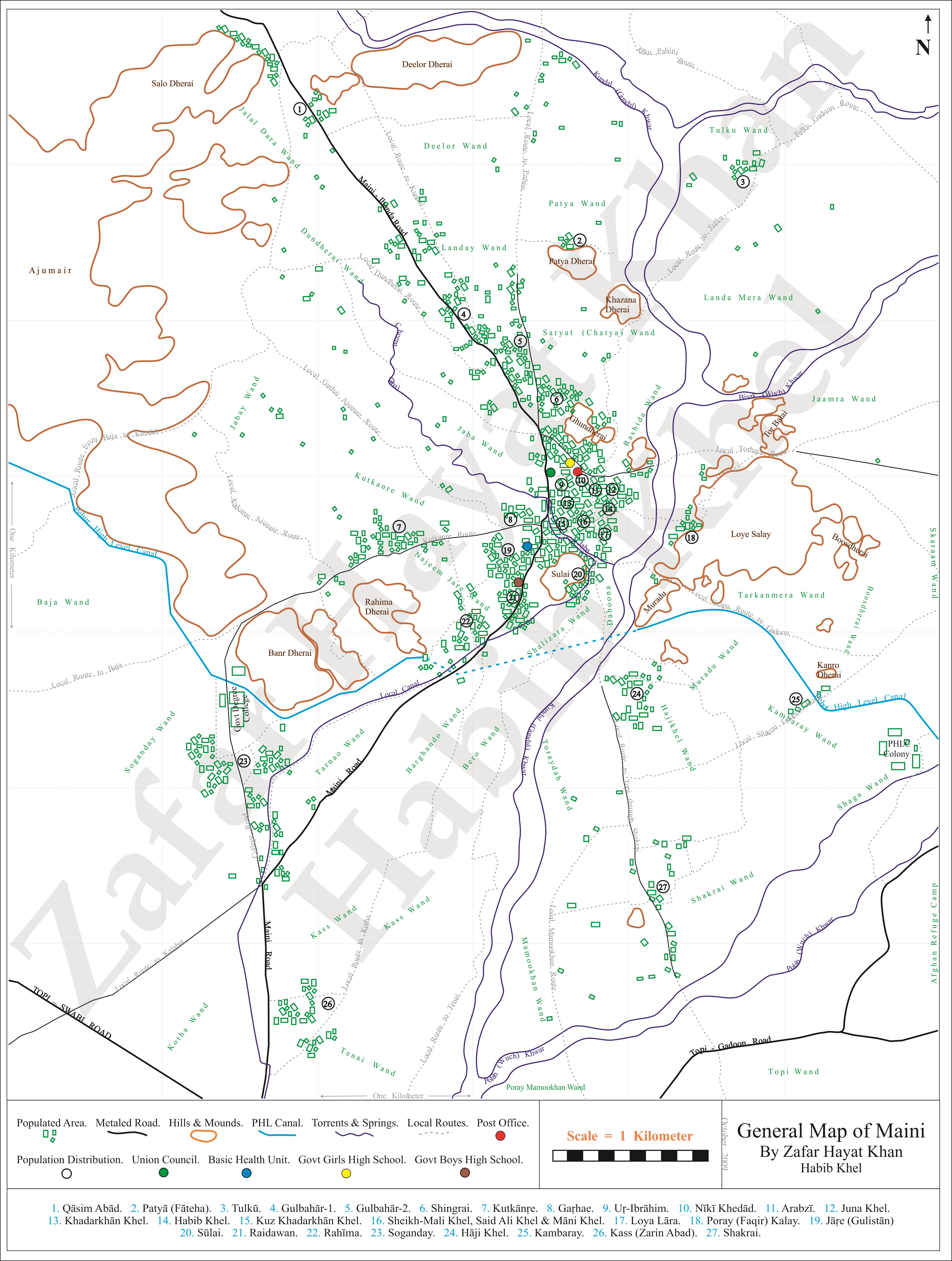
- Country: Pakistan
- Province: Khyber Pakhtunkhwa
- District: Swabi
- Time zone: UTC+5 (PST)
- Postal code: 23450
- Website: www.maini.tk

Maini (locally known as Menai, Pashto: مینئ and Urdu: مینی) is the name of a village (now a town) and a union council as well as a lush green physiographic valley with natural streams and fertile agricultural land which resides in Topi Tehsil in the eastern part of Swabi District of the province of Khyber Pakhtunkhwa in Pakistan. It has a very detailed historic profile, from the early historic age till the Partition of Pakistan. Maini lies at latitude 34°07'07.23" north and longitude 72°36'32.38" east with an elevation of about 383 meters above the sea level. Total area of Maini valley is about 5 kilometres from east to west and 6 kilometres from north to south.

The population of Maini is now exceeding 80,000 (not according to the Government census). It is considered one of the highly educated area of Topi Tehsil, where there are about twenty five Government primary schools, a Government high school for boys, a Government high school for girls, one Government degree college (Sahibzada Muhammad Khurshid Memorial College), one private girl's college and more than two dozen of private primary and high schools. These institutions produced highly qualified personals for the country, who are serving the nation in different public sector departments and private sector as well. Most of the population Maini also helps the country in foreign exchange earnings; where they serve the Gulf and European countries in this respect.

On the other side initial health facilities are provided in the Government's Basic Health Unit while one can also find a dozen small private medical units. With these basic and dire needs, Maini also provides good opportunities for the sports facilities. There is an official sports ground, named as Cheeno, in its development the Government is taking keen interest but a case has been filed in the court which made it disputed. Most of the population play cricket, soccer (football), badminton volleyball and kabaddi, while the local game mukhka/makha is also played only at the arrival of summer.

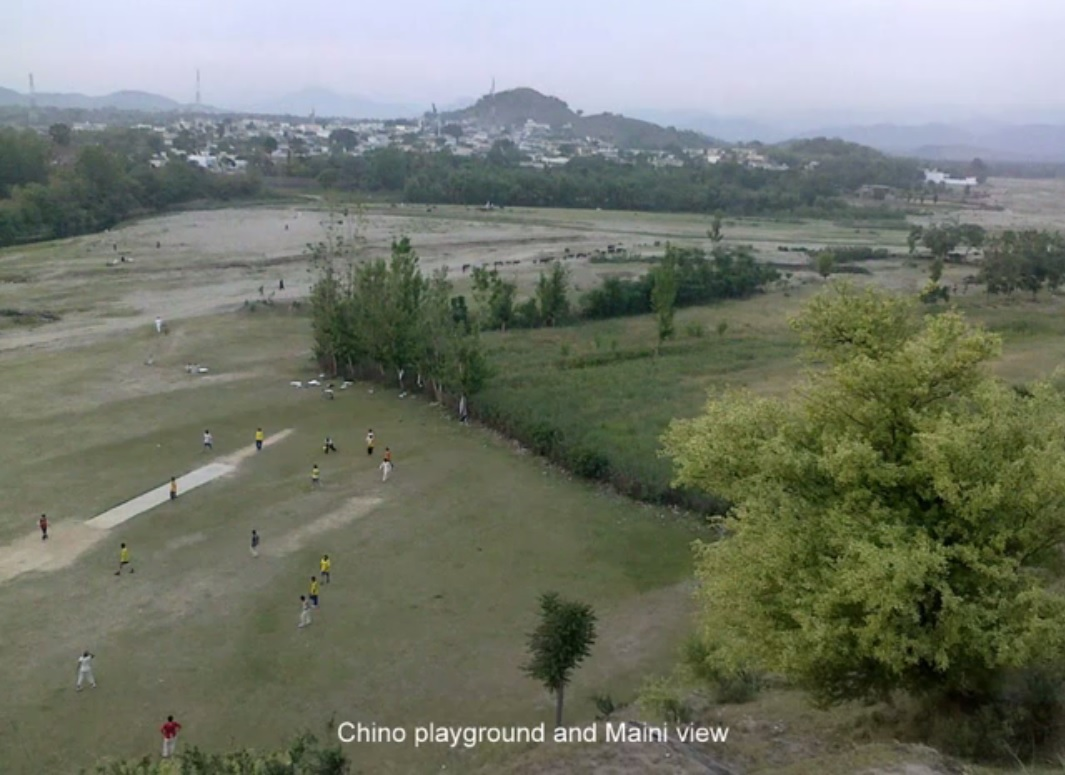
Cheeno Sports Ground (seen from Muradu Dherai)

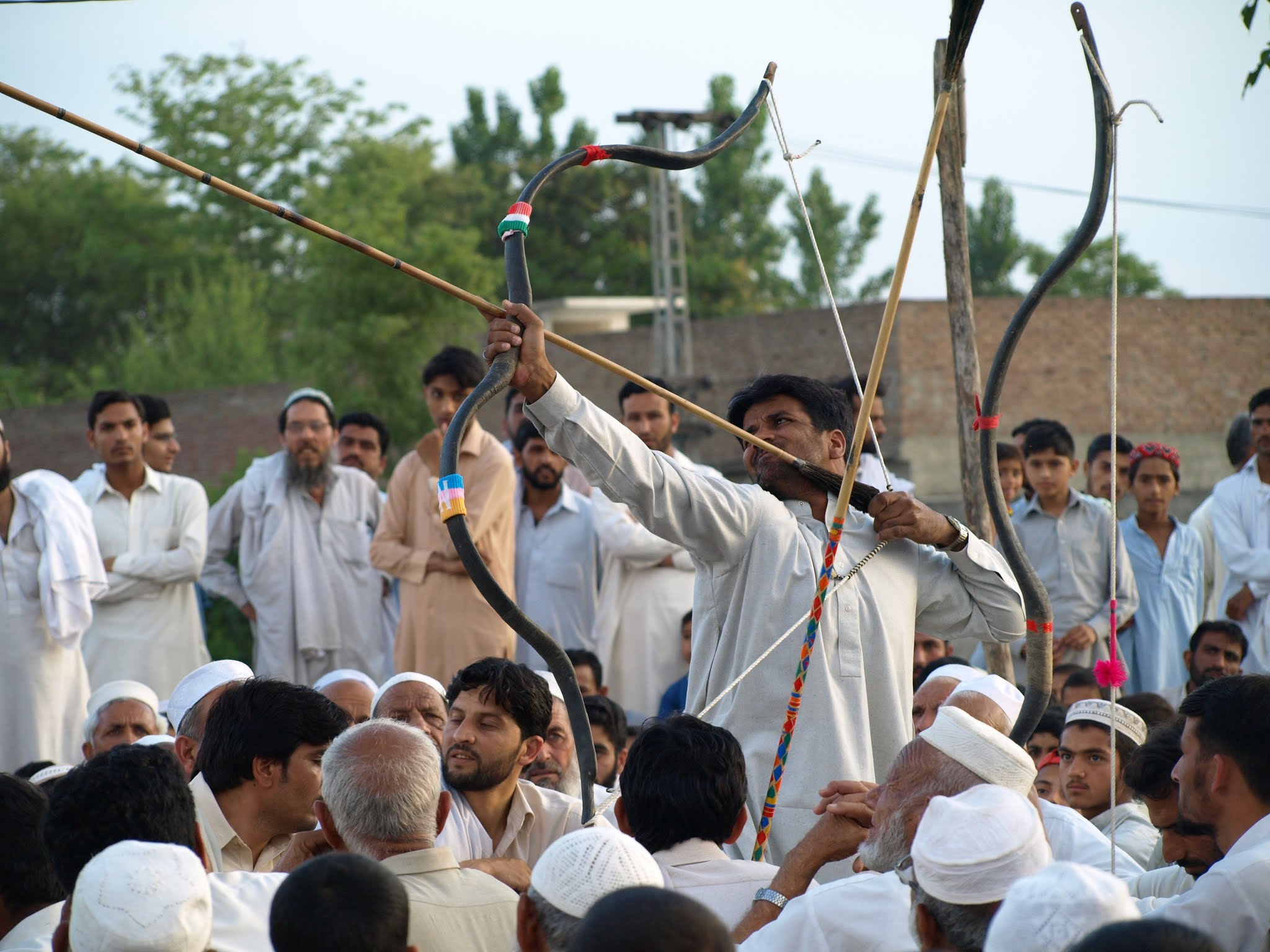
Makha or Mukha (local game played at Maini)

== Geography ==
Maini is located 17 kilometers east of Swabi city, 5 kilometers north of Topi city and 2 kilometers west of Gadoon Amazai Industrial Zone. The main Swabi-Topi road provides a connection near Kotha village which runs towards north and takes 5 kilometers to arrive at Maini village. This road is also an ancient track which then runs north of Maini, goes through Jhanda village and extends to Buner District. On the three sides Maini is bounded by hills while the southern plain gap provides a flowing route to one hill-torrent (wuch khwar), one river (kundal river) and a natural spring (Cheena) that are running through its heart and irrigate the southern fields.

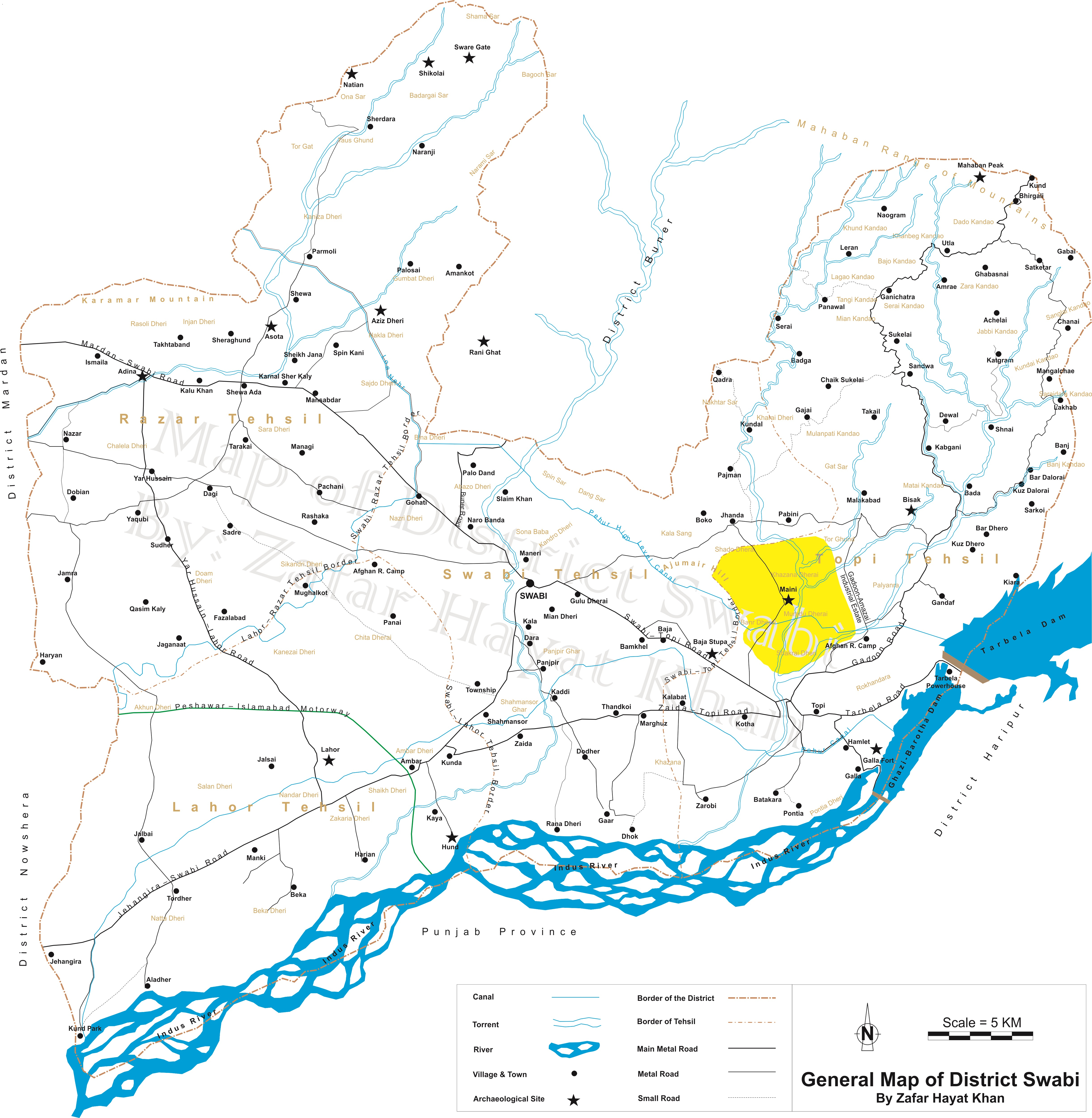
Map of District Swabi (showing Maini in yellow colour)

Maini resides in the southern foothills of 2225 meters high Mahābaṇ Range of mountains while Ajumair hill lies in its west and the barren Gadoon hills are lying in its east which blocks the water of Tarbela Dam. All these mountains are Piedmont zones and a tentative division between lesser Himalayas and the Hindu-Kush (Dani 2001: 13).

Topi lies in its south (most accurately south-southeast), Kotha village lies in its proper south, Baja & Bamkhel lies in its southwest, it is bounded by Ajumair hill in the west, Boko & Jhanda lies in its north-northwest, Pabini lies in its north, Malakabad (old Malka-kadai) lies in its north-northeast, Beesak lies in its northeast, Gadoon-Amazai Industries lies in its east and the Gadoon Afghan Refugee Camp lies in its southeast.

=== Subdivisions ===
Maini village comprises numerous subdivisions locally called tapas or mohallahs. Originally the tapas where formed at the time of Sheikh Mali baba between the year 1500–1550, at the time when the newly acquired lands were distributed among the families. These tapas were as follow:

1. Sheikh Mali Khel
2. Mani Khel
3. Said Ali Khel
4. Khadhar Khan Khel
5. Khadhar Khan Khel (Ghari)
6. Niki Khedad
7. UR Ibrahim
8. Habib Khel
9. Arab Zai
10. Juna Khel
11. Gulbahar 1
12. Gulbahar 2
13. Redawan (U.S.R)
14. Qadarmann Zalmi Chowk
15. Ismail Abad

When the population had grown and people moved out of the center of the maini to the surrounding area, new mohallahs were formed for administrative purpose only. These newly formed mohallahs were usually a mixture of the people of the tapas. Some of the mohallah are Qāsim Abād, Patyā (Fāteha), Tulkū, Gulbahār-1 and 2, Shīngrai, Kutkānṛe, Gaṛhai, Poray (Faqir) Kalay, Jāṛe (Gulistān), Sūlai, Raidawan, Rahīma, Hāji Khel( Miagan), Kambaray, Shakrai, Soganday and Kass (Zarin Abad).

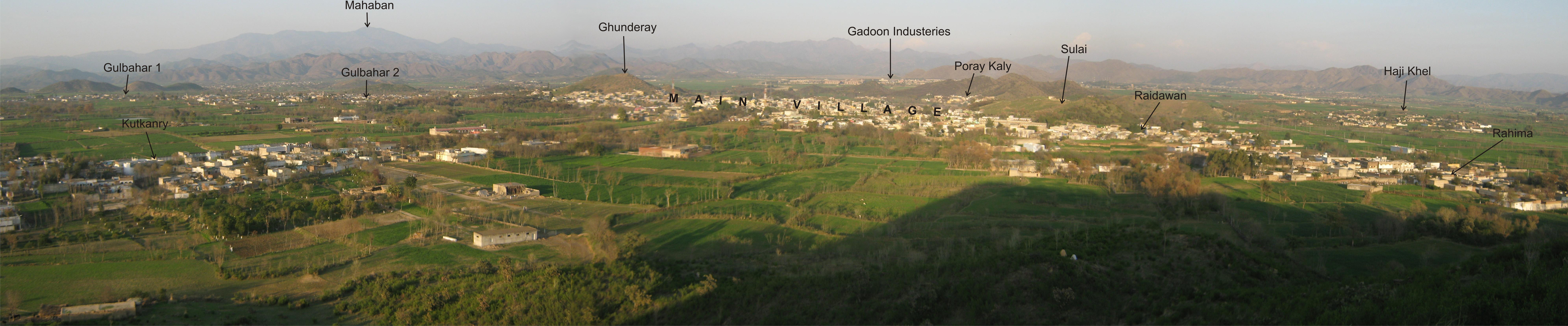
General View of Maini from Rahima Dherai

== Name ==
As for as the nomenclature of the name Maini is concerned, most of the local elders are of the view that it is a derivative from the name of a certain non-Muslim Queen Mainamati (erroneously called Mainawati by the locals). History mentions Queen Mainamati as the wife of Manikachandra of Candra dynasty who ruled during 10th/11th century A.D in Bengal. Whereas, some of the modern writers are of the view that the term Maini may be taken from the name of a group of passerine birds common Myna or Mynah. However, a thorough research is needed to search the term Maini in Sanskrit and Prakrit languages. Zafar Hayat Khan of the Department of Archaeology, University of Peshawar is taking keen interest and trying his best to solve the issue of the term Maini.

== Languages, people and religion ==
Pashto is the main language spoken in a specific dialect. Urdu being National language is also spoken and understood. People mainly belong to the Utman tribe of Mandanr, the specific branch/lineage of Yusufzai clan. Whereas the religious background of the whole population is Sunni Muslim. However, before the partition of Pakistan and India in 1947, Hindu community was living side by side with the Muslim community, who were known as the business class Hindus.

== Climate ==
Maini features a semi-arid climate, with very hot summers and cold winters. Winter starts in mid-November and ends in late-March, while summer months are from May to September. The mean maximum summer temperature surpasses 40 °C (104 °F) during the hottest month, and the mean minimum temperature is 23 °C (73 °F). The mean minimum temperature during winter is 2 °C (36 °F), while the maximum is 17 °C (63 °F). Here the rainfall occurs in both winter and summer because it is a monsoon region which comes under both the Malakand and Hazara zonal rainfall regions. Due to western disturbances, the winter rainfall shows a higher record between the months of February and April. Wind speeds vary during the year, from 5 knots (5.8 mph; 9.3 km/h) in December to 24 knots (28 mph; 44 km/h) in June. The relative humidity varies from 46% in June to 76% in August. The highest temperature of 50 °C (122 °F) was recorded in June 1995, while the lowest −3.9 °C (25.0 °F) occurred in January 1970.

== Natural mounds ==
Deelor Dherai lies in the north of Maini which separates it from Pabini, whereas it blocks the Kundal River from entering the populated area of Gulbahar. One can approach this mound through Deelor/Kundal route, leads from Gulbahar-1 to Pabini village.

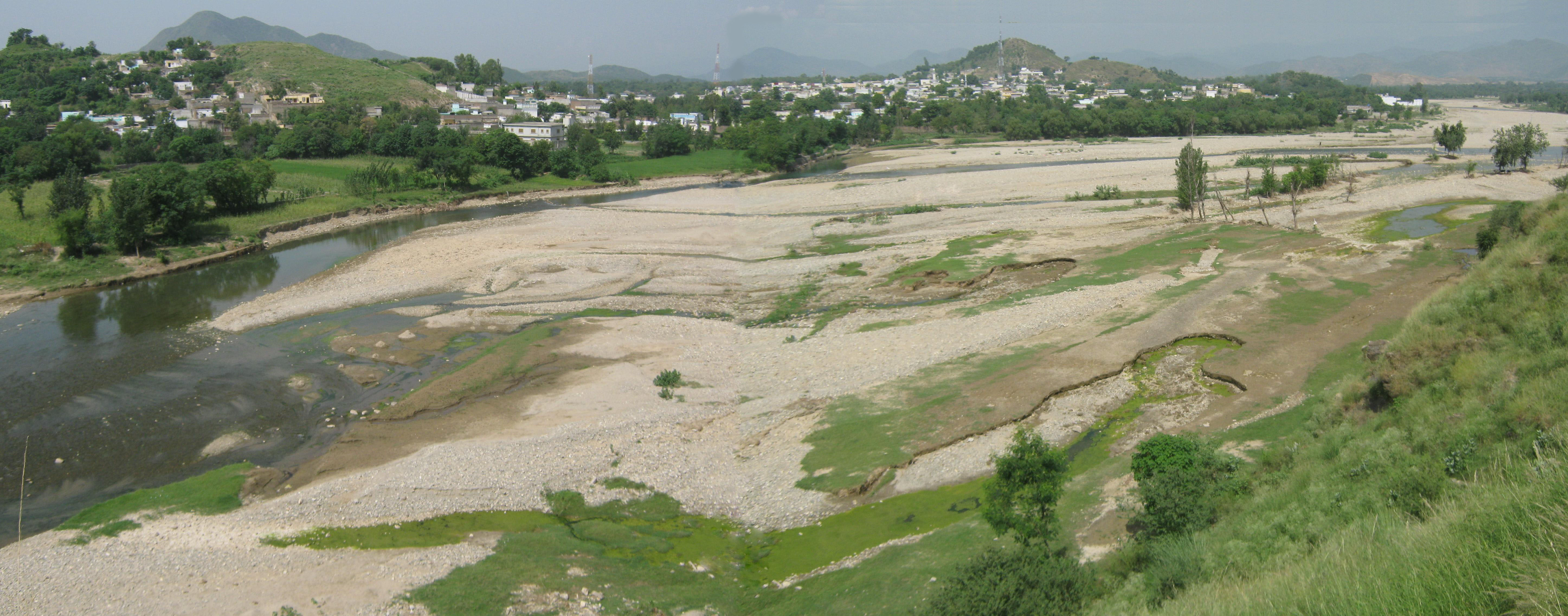
General View of Maini, Kundal River and Cheeno Sports Ground from Muradu Dheri

Salo Dherai and Shado Dherai lies in the northwest of Maini which can be considered the northern portion of Ajumair hill. These natural mounds are a division between Jhanda and Maini and can be approached from Qasim Abad through the Jhanda road.

Ajumair hill is the highest and largest amongst all the natural mounds which covers the whole western border of Maini. It naturally separates Maini from Baja and Bamkhel village and is accessible through Gulbahar-1, Garhai and Kutkanre through Dundhery and Jabay routes.

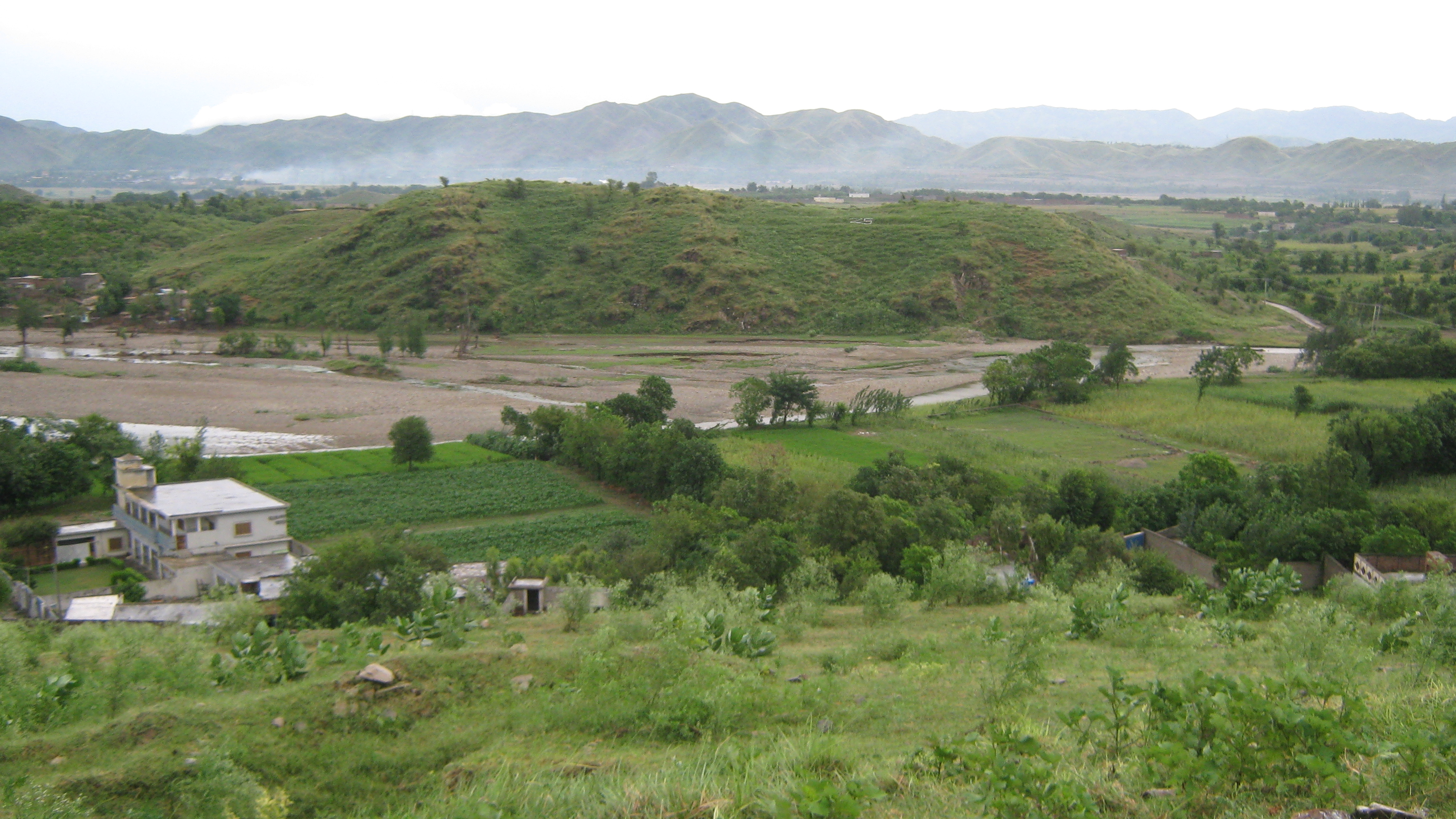
A View of Muradu Dheri from Sulai

Banr Dherai another low mound is located inside Maini but in its southwestern territory. It separates the two Mohallahs of Maini, one Kutkanre being in its north and the other Soganday in its south. It is approachable through the Kutkanre–Baja route and through Soganday.

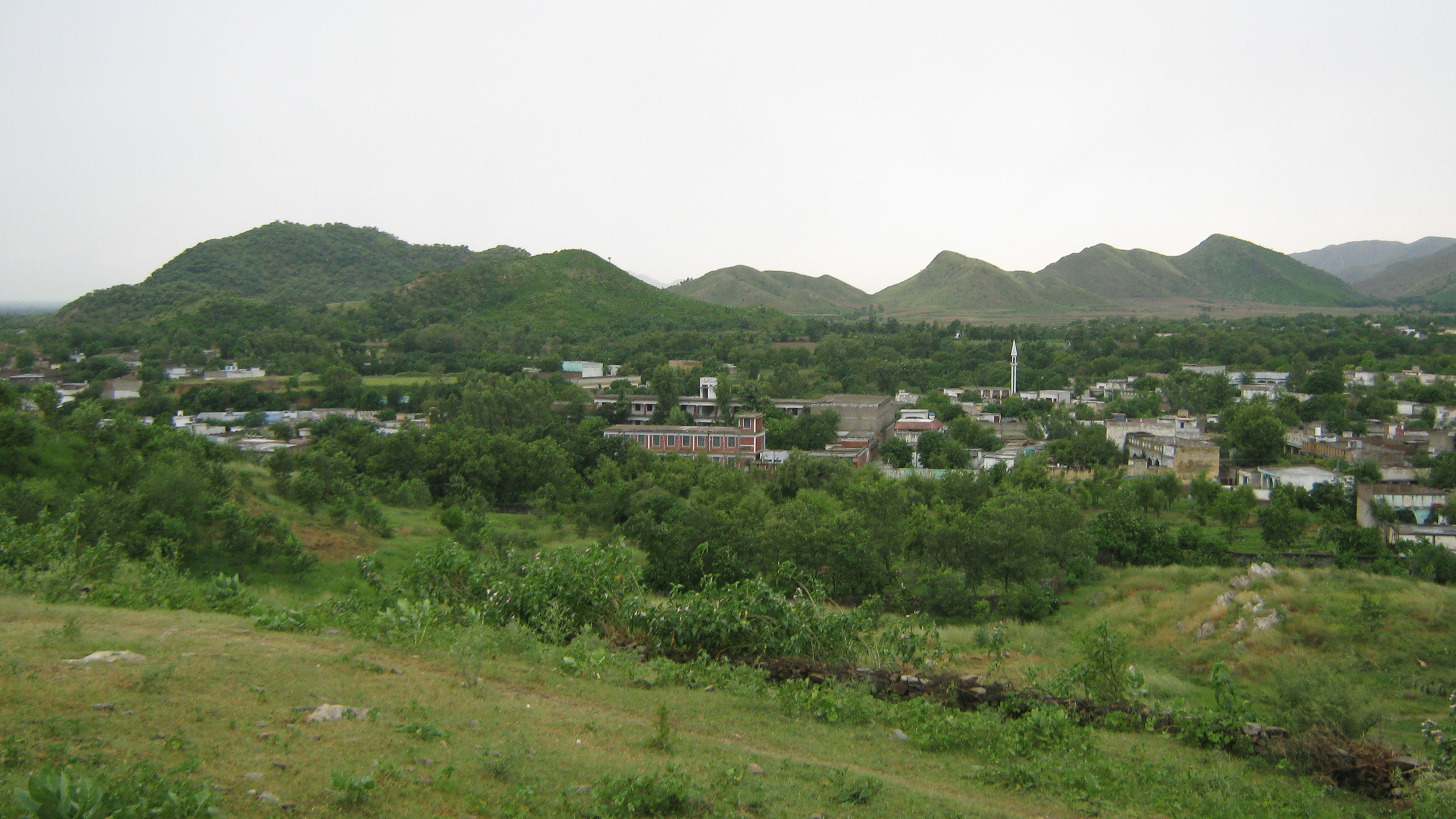
General View of Banr Dheri and Parts of Ajumair

Rahima Dherai also resides inside the populated area of the village which is located a little east to the Banr Dherai. One can access this low mound through Najeem Jare and through Mohallah Rahima.

Sulai Dherai lies inside the thickly populated area of Maini which is now mostly covered by modern houses. It resides in the south-central part of the village which can be approached from Raidawan, Shalizara and Sulai Mohallahs.

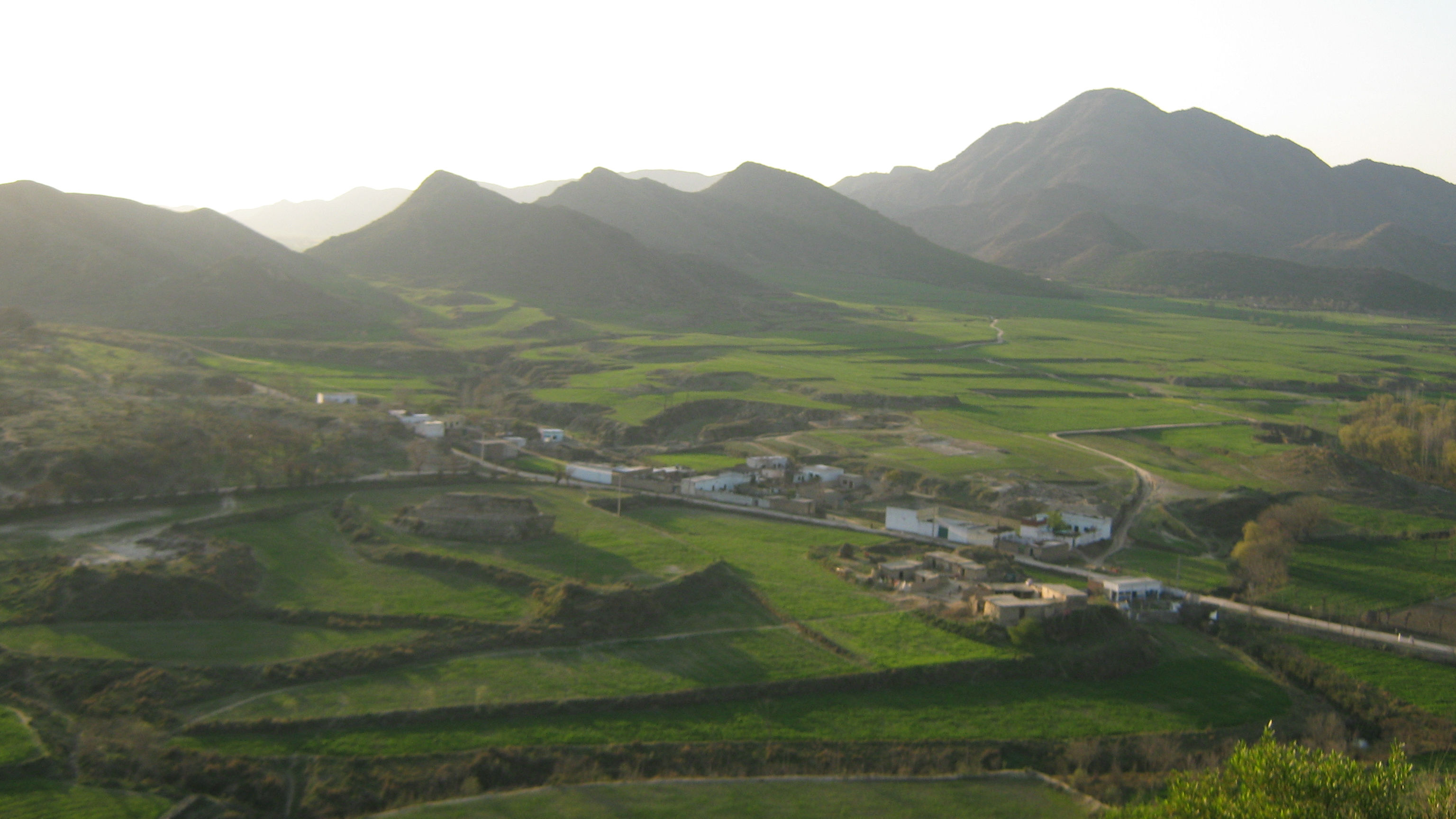
View of Ajumair Hill

Muradu Dherai is a low mound which is located beside the Cheeno sports ground on the bank of Kundal river which provides a scenic view to the sports lovers. It resides in the southeast of Maini which can be approached through Karpa route and the modern Pehur High Level Canal.

Loye Salay, Boos-Dhery and Tor-Batai are other natural mounds which are located immediately in the eastern populated area and resides Poray (Faqir) Kalay Mohallah in its gulfs. Two of these block the water of Kundal river and separate the eastern agricultural lands of the village from the populated area. These can be approached through Karpa route, Poray Kaly and Tor-batai route.

Ghundhery resides in the center of the village, looks like an ancient stupa, and is a low hill now covered by modern houses on all the sides.

Khazana Dherai and Patya Dherai lies in the north-northeast of Maini which is natural division between Mohallah Patya and Chatya. Khazana Dherai can be considered a natural block to the Kundal River which does not let the water approach Chatya wand. These two mounds are accessible through Chatya route and Patya route.

== History ==
As far as the ancient cultural profile of this part of the World is concerned, we do not know much about the Pre-Historic and Proto-Historic age. There may be several archaeological sites that can produce the traces of human habitation before the second millennium B.C but that will need thorough and methodical archaeological excavations. The earliest evidences we so far have is the arrival of Achaemenian (Persian Zoroaster), who are evident by their seglois.

=== Achaemenid rule ===
The historical profile of this land can be traced back to the time of Achaemenians (Persians of 6th to 4th century B.C). The Achaemenid Empire in Swabi region is evident in the historical literature where the writer Qureshi (1967: 83) says, "The districts west of river Indus as far as the river Kabul were inhibited by the Astacenians and Assacenians who paid tribute to the Achaemenian king, Cyrus who ruled from 558 to 530 BC". Astacenians were the Ashtak, a confederacy of eight tribes in the Peshawar region and Assacenians were the Ashvakas (generally misidentified by the British with the modern Yusufzai, who still live in this valley). Yusufzai Afghans entered the valley in the 16th century.

=== Buddhism ===
Buddhism extended its horizons up to the western borders of Gandhara and enfolded in its wings the regions between Kabul River and Indus River. The mounds of Maini produce Buddhist remains all around. Due to the presence of Buddhist remains, Maini may be termed as a critical part of Gandhara civilization.

=== Alexander invasion ===
Alexander, who had a rivalry with Achaemenians, during 327 BC, after crushing western parts of Gandhāra, entered the plains of Swabi to fight against the Ashvakas (Qureshi, 1967: 93) and to meet the second division of his army for crossing Indus River at Hund, ancient Udhbāndepur or Ohind. He may have entered Maini when chasing his Persian counterparts.

=== Mauryan Empire ===
The Rock Edicts of Ashoka in Shahbazgarhi may be evidence of the presence of Mauryan Empire in the nearby regions of the river Indus.

=== Indo-Greek period ===
The short-lived occupation of Mauryans lasted for a century which did not completely wipe out Greek influence. The occupation of Indo Greek kingdom in Maini is evident from their large number of coins, which provides the information that before their invasion this place was introduced to them. Buddhist and Hindu remains that are scattered throughout this valley are the finest examples of Buddhist livelihood in this region.

=== Kushan rule ===
The most powerful and renowned sovereigns of Kushans made Gandhara a veritable holy land of Buddhism through the sacred shrines and monasteries. The valley of Maini is filled with the archaeological sites erected during the Kushan Empire which prove the widespread character of Kushan Art. One can find large number of coins of Scythians and great Kushans with the inclusion of small number of coins of Hindu Shahis (Turk-Shahis) and Muslim dynasties in the nearby mounds.

=== Huns/Ephthalite invasion ===
In Pakistan, generally, the Kushans were followed by Ephthalite Hūṇas, who destroyed the Buddhist establishments. Whereas the monuments at Maini would have faced the same situation. When Hsüan-Tsang came to northwest frontier, he found the country in a ruinous depopulated state with most of the Buddhist establishments in a state of decay. Most of the archaeological sites of Maini were then left unpopulated.

=== Hindu Shahi rule ===
Kāñṛo Dherai, a mound filled with dressed stones, has the remains of Hindu-Shahis which has signs of burning and flaming on its stones. These burnt stones indicate that Ghaznavids have rooted out the Hindu-Shahis from here and burnt their possessions.

=== Arrival of Yusufzai ===
Later on, the Yusufzai then occupied this region and till now the utmān (from the lineage of Mandanṛ), a sub-tribe of Yusufzai, use to live here. It is constantly obvious in the history and in the Pashto writings that a war broke between the Yusufzais and Mughals in the northern fields of Topi (Rasool, 1993: 12). While the northern fields of Ṭopi belong to Maini which means that the war was fought in Maini valley.

=== Islamic period ===
Sheikh Mali Baba (originally named as ""Siekh Ādam"" belonged to Kshatriya family, a renowned and wise man in the Pashto history also belonged to this valley who is responsible for the allotment of the lands among the Pakhtoon tribes, from Indus to Swat. Some local areas hindki peoples after converted to Islam now they are calling himself sheikh Mali khel, basically they are hindki peoples after convert to islam they descendants as Sheikh-Mali, they are still speaking Hindko language, He was a pious man who wrote a book, Daftar, about Yousuzais and about the territory reforms of the Pakhtoon valley (Nawaz, 1987: 249-253). Haji Baba was a Syed saint originally from the Upper Dir District, who settled in Maini, Swabi. His descendants are known as the Haji Khel Miagan, and are highly respected for their Sayyid and pious lineage. In South Asia it is not an ethnic title but an occupational title generally attributed to Muslim trading families. The Shaikhs claimed to be descendants of Arabs, however almost all Shaikhs did not actually descend from Arabs. Hindus who converted to Islam and took the title shaikh tended to be of the Kshatriya varna, although use of the title was flexible. In the former Frontier Regions and Punjab of Pakistan, the title shaikh was given to recent converts and not those of Arab descent. The Julaha weaver caste became Ansaris, who claimed to descend from Abu Ayub Al-Ansari. The butcher castes claimed to descend from the Quraysh tribe. The Kayastha record keeper caste became Siddiques, who claimed to descend from Abu Bakr Al-Siddiq.

A saying which attests to the flexibility of the title of shaikh stated: "Last year I was a Julaha (weaver); this year I am a sheikh; next year, if the crops are good, I shall be a Syed."

=== 1857 War and the War of Independence ===
During 1857 War of Independence some of the Muslim saints entered Maini who were followed and killed by British army including Sikh Indian soldiers from neighbouring Punjab in the nearby fields. Two of the saints have their graves in Habīb-Khel Mosque while the others are lying in the eastern fields across the hill torrent.

Brigadier-General Sir Neville B. Chamberlain, a British soldier from the Punjāb garrison, was appointed at Maini valley and Topi region to draw the radicals of Sepoy Mutiny from behind the hills lying in the southeasterly direction of Ambela near the right bank of river Indus (Vevill, 1977: 50).

== Archaeological sites ==
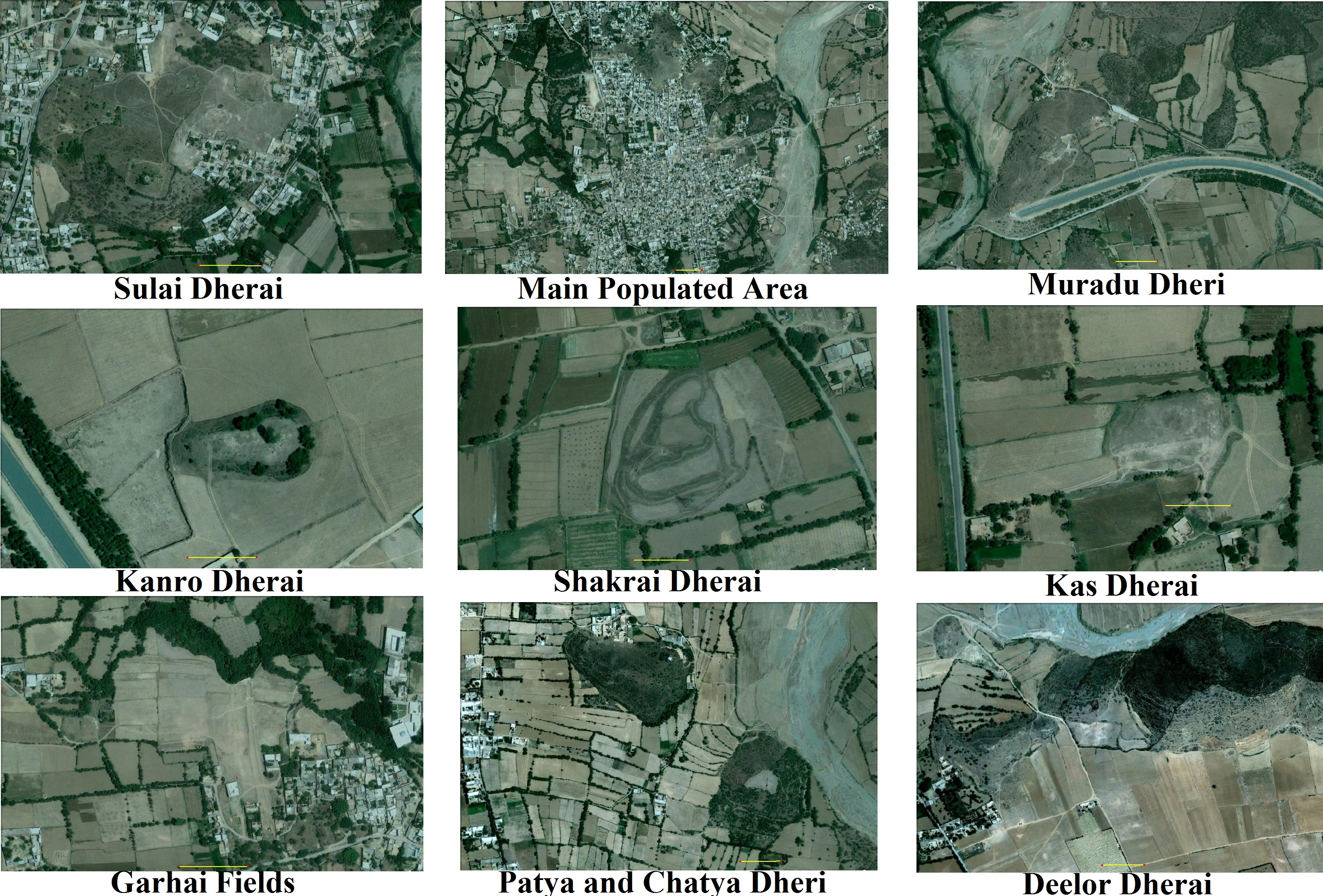
Archaeological Sites at Maini

A large number of Buddhist and Hindu archaeological sites are in Maini valley. The main village was founded on ancient remains and the main populated area is surrounded by several archaeological sites of various types. Notable archaeological sites of Maini are Bañṛ Dherai, Najeem Jāṛe graveyard, Murādu Dherai, Hāji Khel, Sūlai Dherai, Rahīma, Kāñṛo Dherai, Ajumair Hill, Ghundheray, Shādo Dherai, Ḍeelor (Lanḍay) Dherai, Khazāna Dherai, Patyā (Fāteha) Dherai, Tūlkū Dherai, Shakrai Dherai, Kas Dherai, Parts of Shālizara, Gaṛhai, Ḍhundheray and the parts of the fields between Shakrai and Kambaray.

Maini valley has a strategic position due to its geographical setting. The Buddhist sites of Azīz Dheri and Rāni-Ghaṭ lies in its west beyond the Ajumair hill, the Suumpur stupa of Baja lies in its southwest, Gala fort and Sri-Koṭ are situated in the southeast, archaeological site of Banj hill lies in its east and Shah-kot Baba fort (on Mahābaṇ top) lies in its north.

== Gallery ==
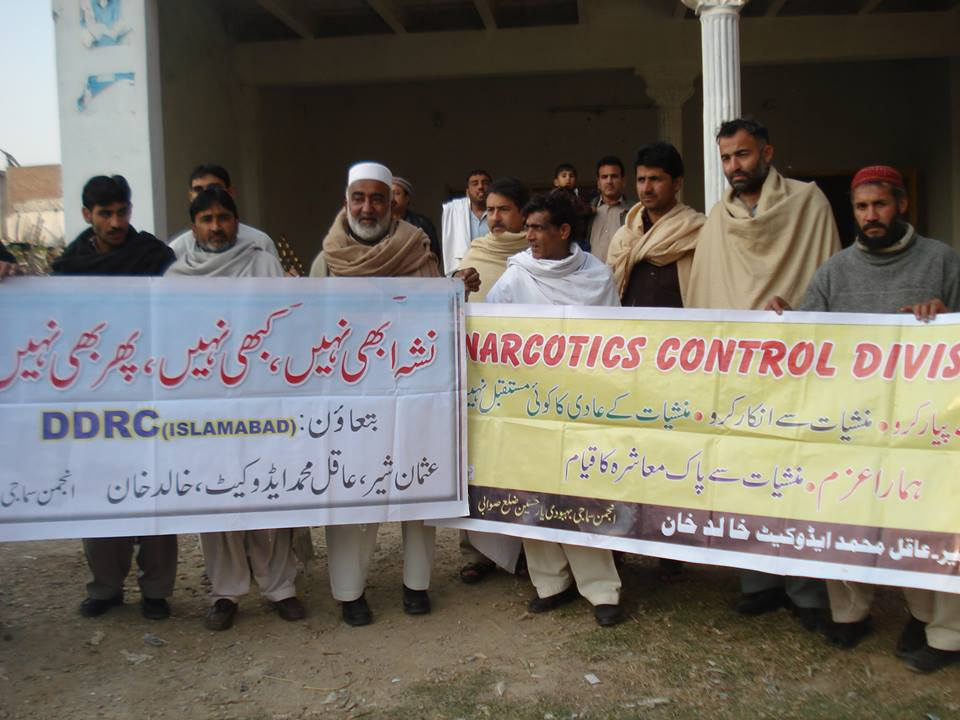
Celebration of Anti-Norcotics Day

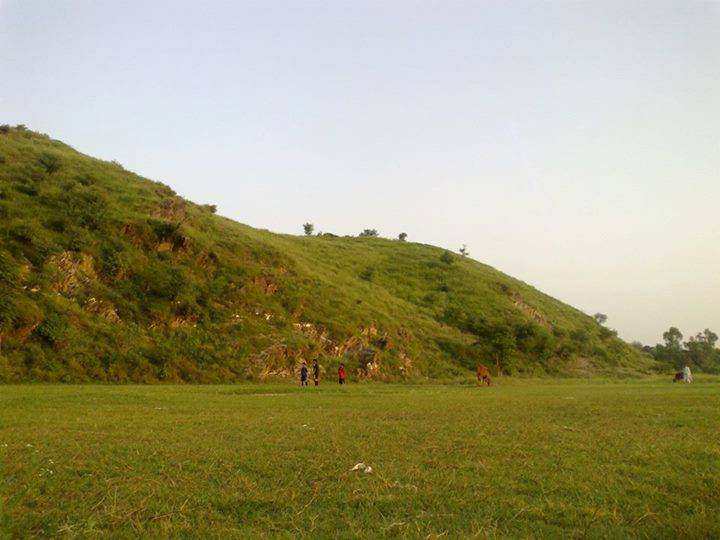
Cheeno Sports Ground on the bank of Kundal

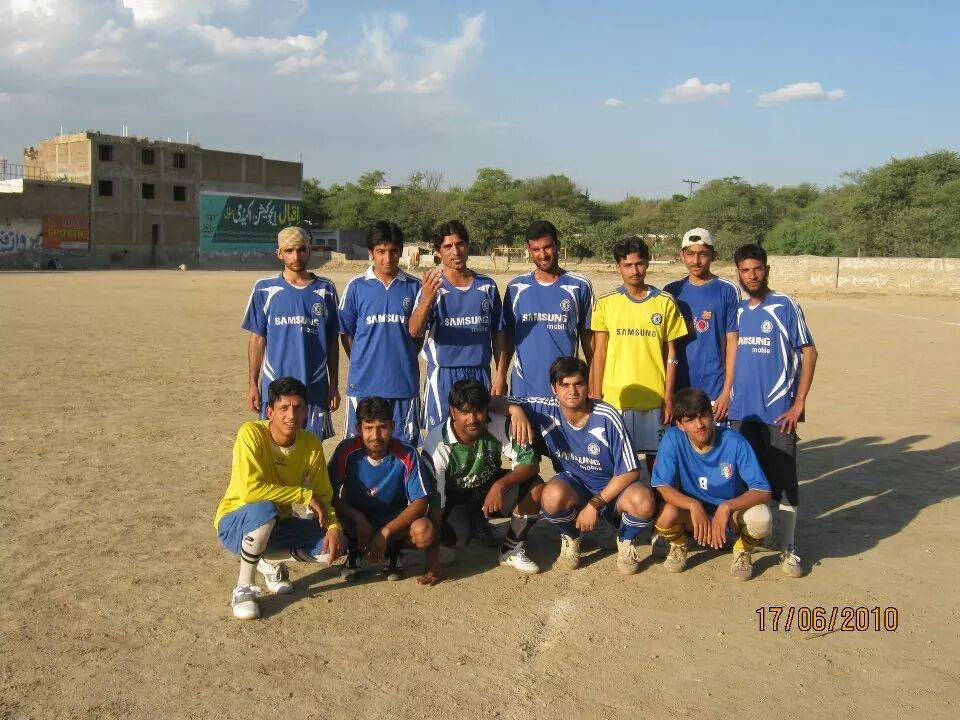
Football Team Players (Games played at Maini)

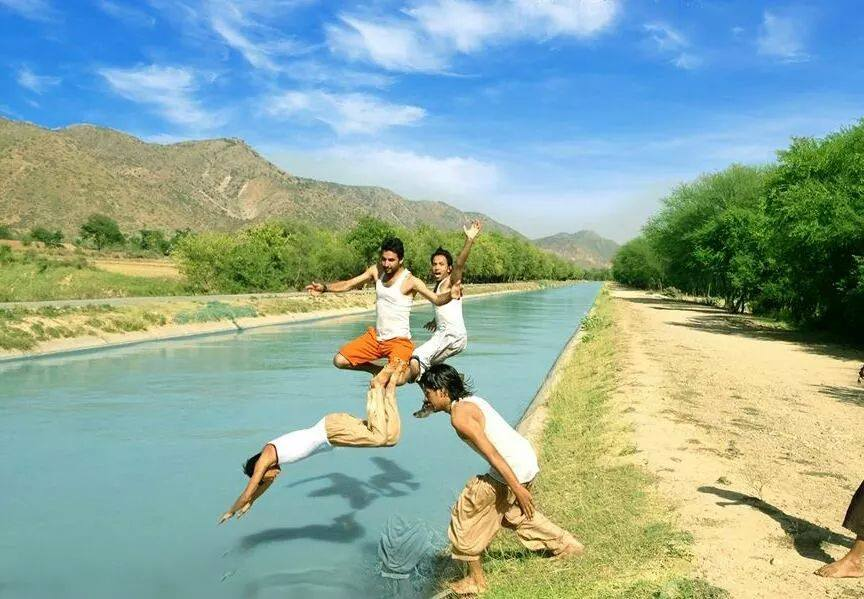
People enjoying swimming in the Pehur High Level Canal

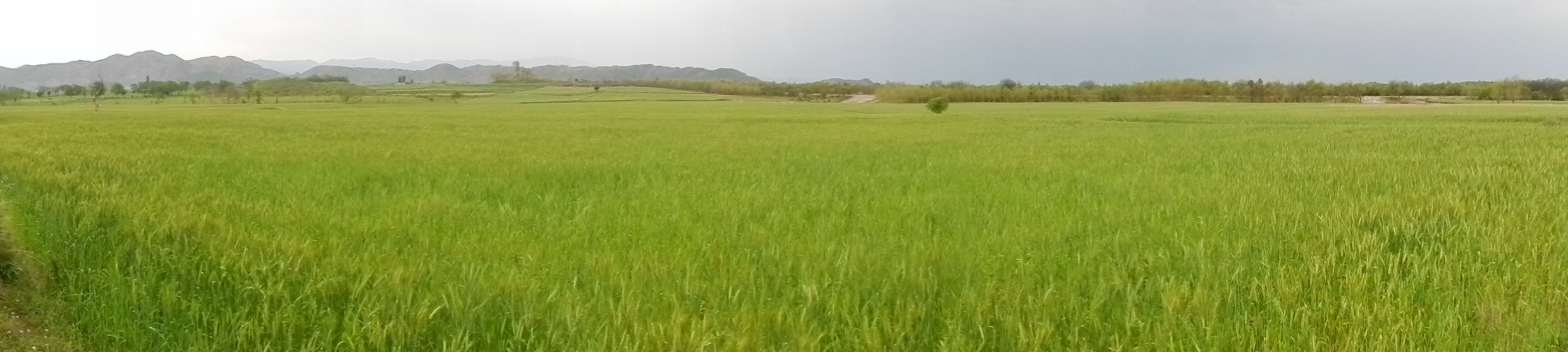
Agricultural Activity at Maini

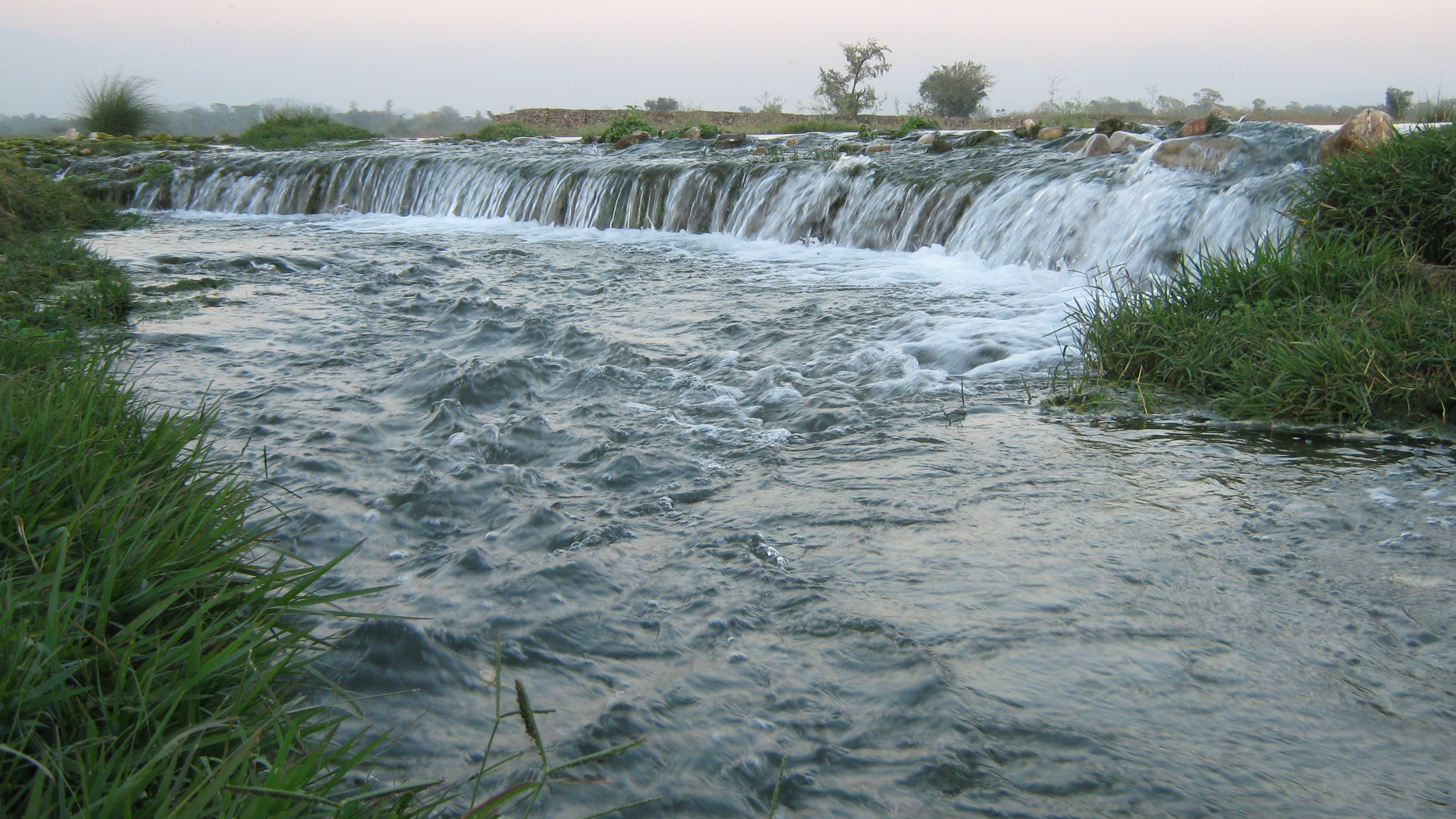
River Kundal at Maini

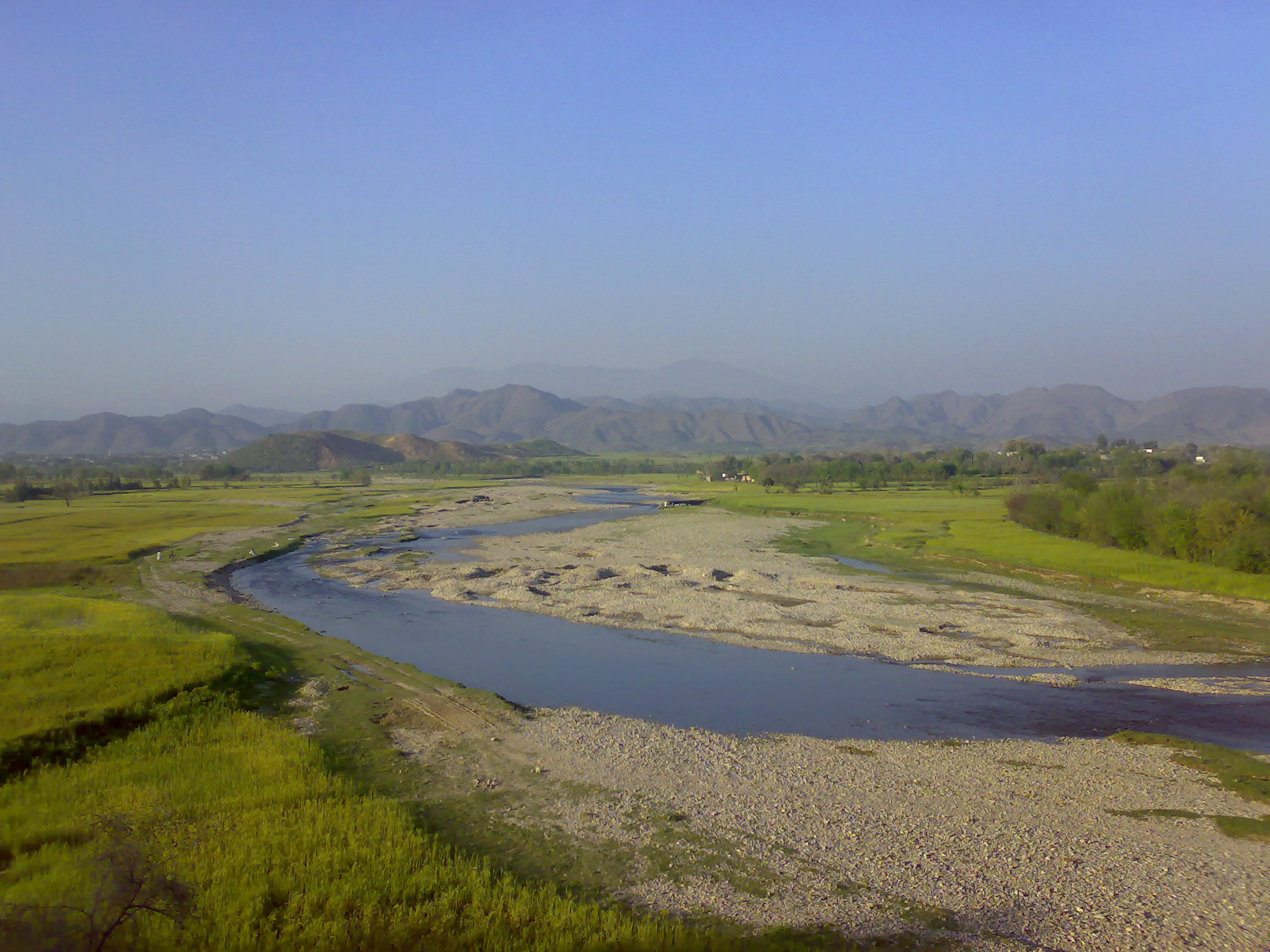
Scenery of Maini

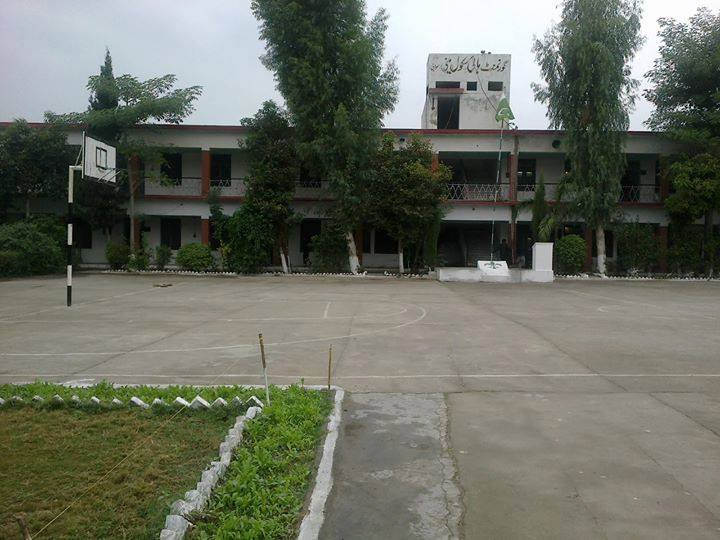
Govt High School Maini

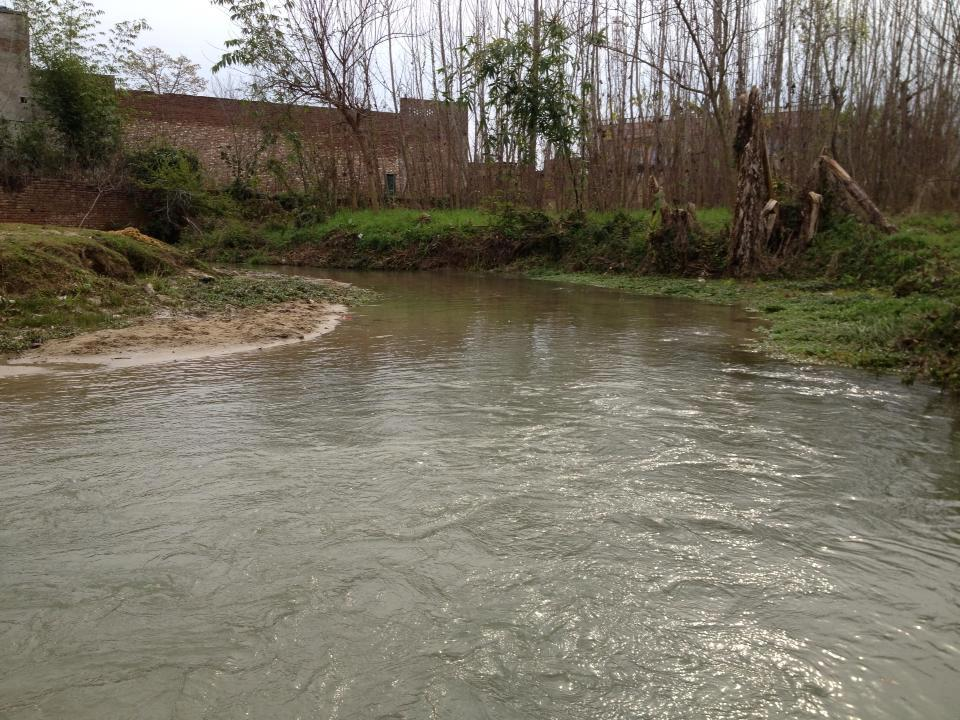
Jabba (The Natural Spring or Stream at Maini)

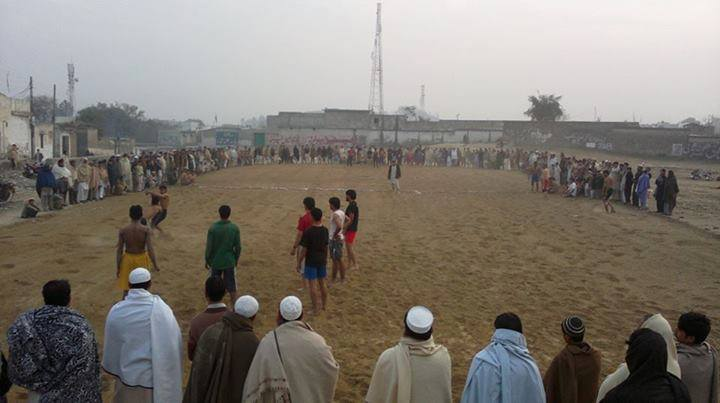
Kabaddi (A local game played at the arrival of winter)

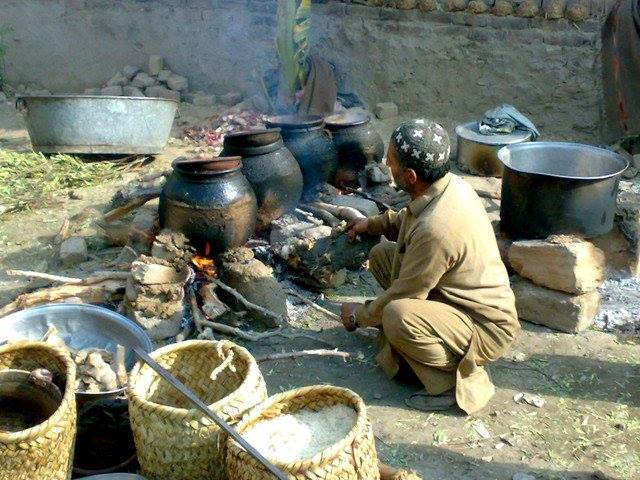
Katawa (A local food, mainly served at occasions)
