= Upper Swat Canal =

Irrigation canal in Khyber Pakhtunkhwa, Pakistan

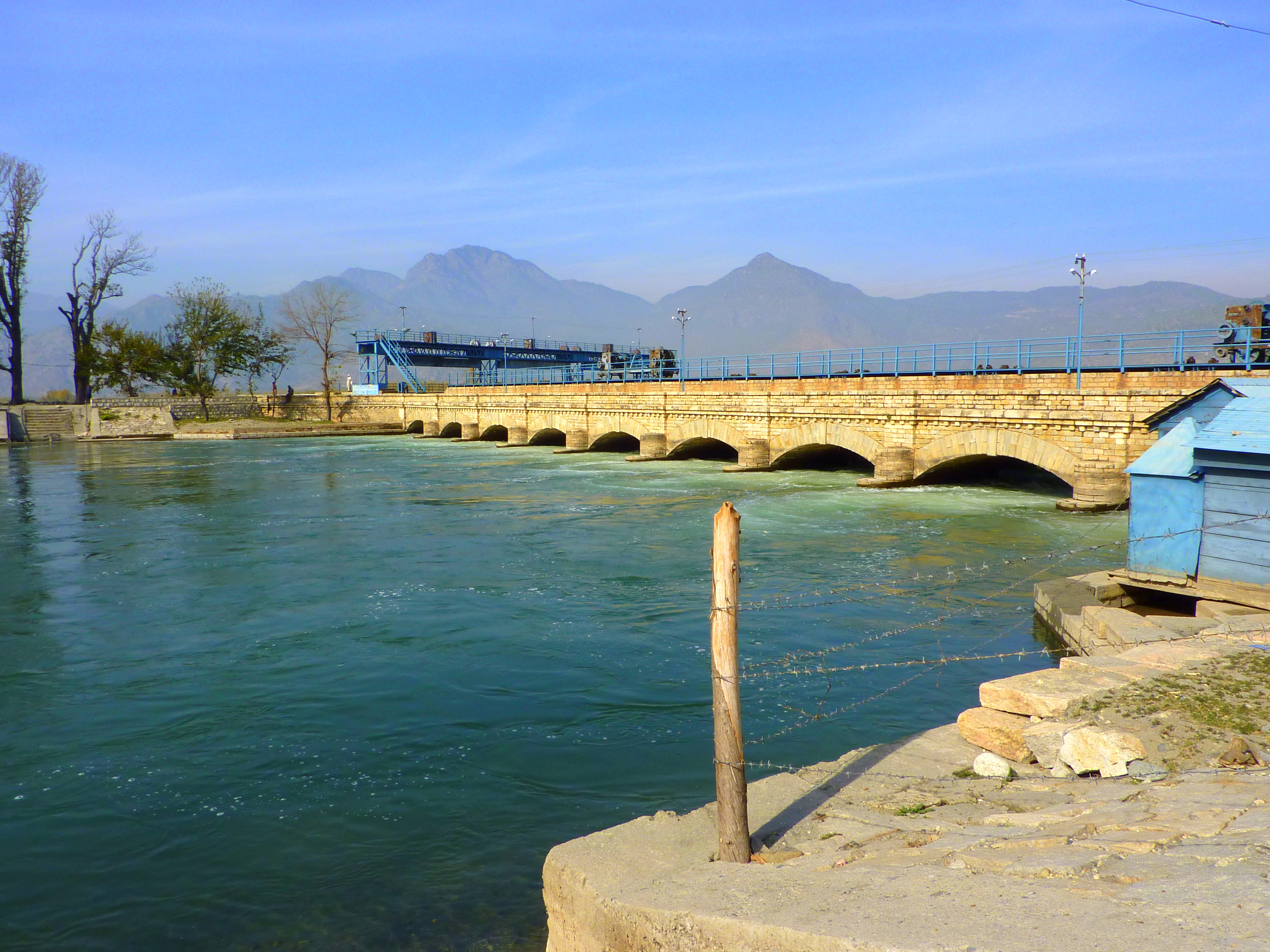
- Amandara Headworks, the canal begins here
- Interactive map of Upper Swat Canal
- Country: Pakistan

Specifications
- Length: 138 miles (222 km)
- Maximum height AMSL: 2,178 ft (664 m)
- Status: Open

History
- Principal engineer: W.P Sangster
- Other engineer: John Benton
- Date approved: 1907
- Date of first use: 1914
- Date completed: 1916

Geography
- Start point: Amandara Headworks, Batkhela, Malakand
- End point: Pehur High Level Canal

Upper Swat Canal is an irrigation canal located in the Khyber Pakhtunkhwa province of Pakistan. The canal takes off from Swat River at Amandarra Headworks in Malakand District. It irrigates a large area in the north of Mardan District, Swabi District and the north-eastern portion of the Charsadda District. The irrigation area is 276,000 acres of land and discharge is 1,800 cusecs. The length of the main canals is 138 miles and that of the distributaries is 431 miles.

== History ==
=== Background ===
During the expansion of the British Empire in the Indian subcontinent, the Malakand Pass was a point of battle in 1897 between the British Army and the local tribesmen who showed heavy resistance. In 1907, the British Empire conceived the Benton Tunnel and Upper Swat Canal project to irrigate the dry Valley of Peshawar and to appease and improve their image among the local tribes.

=== Original alignment ===
After completing preliminary work, surveys, acquiring land and selecting alignments, it was found that the alignment of the main canal from Chakdara to Malakand District was interfered by graveyards, hence it had to be abandoned. This alignment consisted of a 5,000 feet long tunnel, with a slope of 1/100, velocity of 15.2 feet per second and a discharge of 2,394 cusecs.

=== New alignment ===
A new alignment was soon found, however the new alignment included a longer tunnel through the Malakand Pass. The costs were cut by constructing a shorter and more direct main canal. The new tunnel was 11,235 feet (2 miles) long, with a slope of 1:215, velocity of 11.2 feet per second and a discharge of 2,218 cusecs.

=== Execution ===
Work on the tunnel began in March 1910 and was completed in 1914 (now called Benton Tunnel), with irrigation in the region commencing the same year. The Upper Swat Canal was declared complete by the British Empire in late 1916 and the cost was "206 lakhs of Rupees" or Rs20.6 million at the time. It was supervised and executed by Executive Engineer of the North-West Frontier Province at the time, W.P Sangster.

Even though the original design of the Upper Swat Canal had a much greater discharge, the Benton Tunnel created a bottleneck due to its unlined nature, hence the total discharge of the canal was limited to 1,800 cusecs.

== Impact ==
The local population began to grow along with the production of wheat, sugarcane, tobacco, fruits and vegetables. Small villages grew into small towns, the local population began to grow Poplar trees along the canal and waterways. They started growing two crops a year instead of one, with most growing three. The canal brought great prosperity to the region and has become an integral part of it. More than one million people directly or indirectly depend on the Upper Swat Canal for their livelihood.

The canal transformed the Peshawar Division from a rainfed to a canal irrigated area.

== Restoration works ==
Between 1990 and 1999 the Government of Pakistan spent roughly US$130 million to upgrade the existing system of the Upper Swat Canal and the Lower Swat Canal by improving surface and subsurface drainage, remodelling the irrigation system, renovating watercourses and providing support facilities. The project also involved the creation of an auxiliary tunnel to overcome the Benton Tunnel's bottleneck.

== See also ==
List of canals in Pakistan

Lower Bari Doab Canal

Nara Canal
