= Haji Syed Ahmed Shah =

Syed Ahmed Shah, known as Haji Baba, migrated from Saudi Arabia to South Asia somewhere in the 15th or 16th century to preach Islam and later settled in the KP region. His descendants who are Pashtuns are known as Haji Khel Syedan (Syeds) Hajikhel (tribe) or Miangan|Mian by other Pashtun tribes mostly live in Upper Dir District and some have migrated to other districts of Khyber Pukhtunkwa. His tomb is located at Gandigar, Upper Dir District.
