= Pehur High Level Canal =

Canal in Pakistan

Pehure High Level Canal
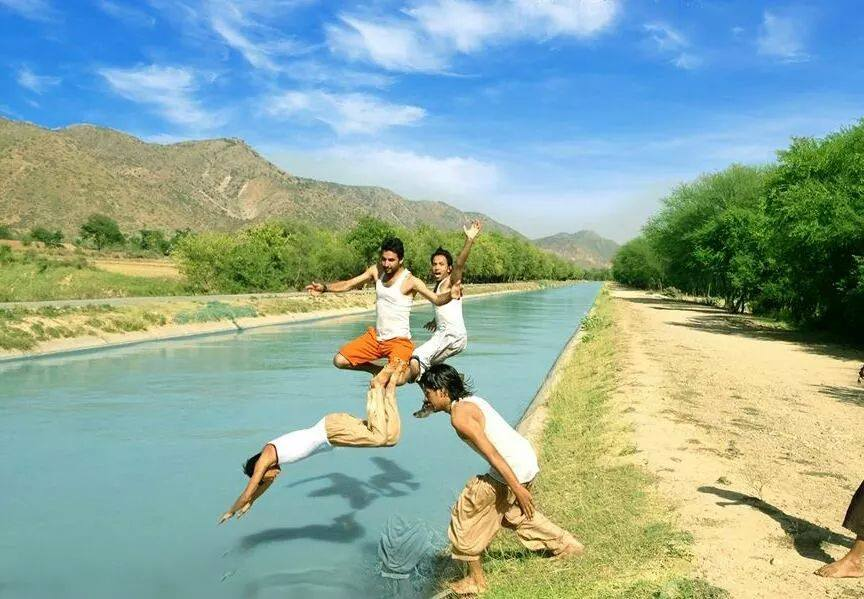
- People swimming in the canal
- Location: Swabi District
- Country: Pakistan

History
- Construction began: 1997
- Date completed: 2004
- Developers: STFA Group

Geography
- Start point: Tarbela Dam
- End point: Upper Swat Canal

Pehure High Level Canal commonly known as STFA Canal located in Swabi District, Khyber Pakhtunkhwa, Pakistan.

== History ==
The Pehure Canal is named after Pehure, a place or sector located in the Hamlet of Swabi, within the Tehsil of Topi. The people of Pehure were primarily affected during the construction of the Tarbela Dam, as they gave up their lands for the dam's construction. As a result, the canal was named after Pehure High Level Cansl to honor their contribution.
