= Haji Khel (tribe) =

Pushtun tribe in Pakistan

Haji Khel is a Pashtun clans of Chamkannis and Tareens. In Sarban clan, they are a tribe or sub-caste of Nurzai, Haroonzai, Tareen settled in Tora Shah, Pishin, Balochistan, Pakistan.

Hajikhel are culturally and linguistically Pashtuns and they are known as "Khannan" by other Pashtun tribes which means "ruler" and that is why most of them use sur-name of "Khan's".
