= Hinduism in Khyber Pakhtunkhwa =

Hindus in Khyber Pakhtunkhwa

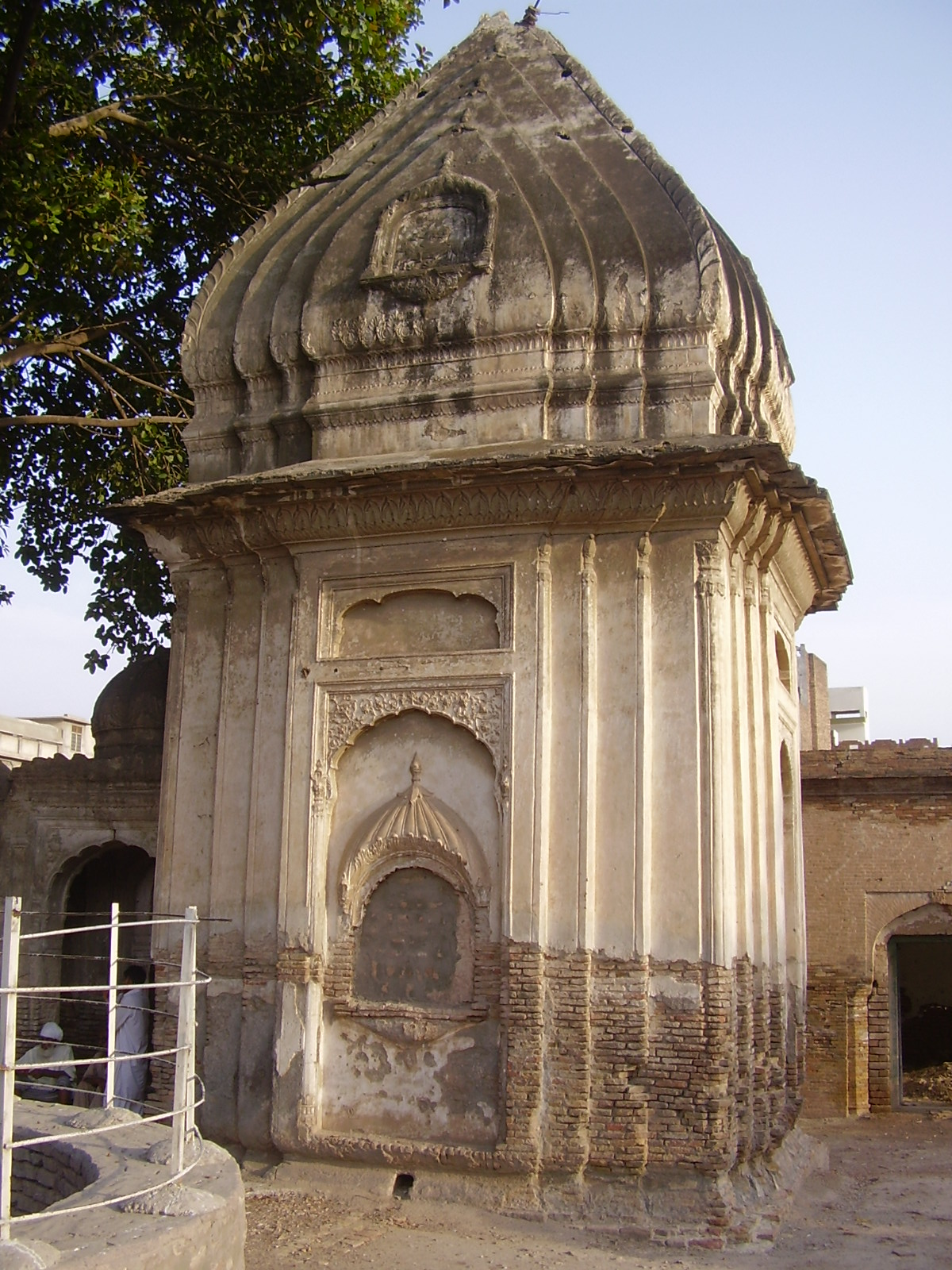
- Gorakhnath Temple in Khyber Pakhtunkhwa.

Total population
- 6,102 (2023); 0.02% of region population

Religions
- Hinduism (majority) including Nanakpanthi, Kalasha and Animists

Languages
- Sanskrit (Sacred); Urdu, Pashto, Hindko, Saraiki, Punjabi

Hinduism is a minority religion in the Khyber Pakhtunkhwa province followed by 0.02% of the population of the province as per 2023 Census.

Though having a small population, the Hindu culture has had a very significant element in the history of Khyber Pakhtunkhwa.

In the final census conducted prior to partition in 1941, Hindus constituted approximately 5.9 percent of the population in North-West Frontier Province, which later amalgamated with the Federally Administered Tribal Areas to become Khyber Pakhtunkhwa. With violence and religious cleansing accompanying the partition of India in 1947, the vast majority departed the region en masse, primarily migrating eastward to states that ultimately fell on the eastern side of the Radcliffe Line including Delhi, East Punjab, Haryana, and Rajasthan.

== History ==
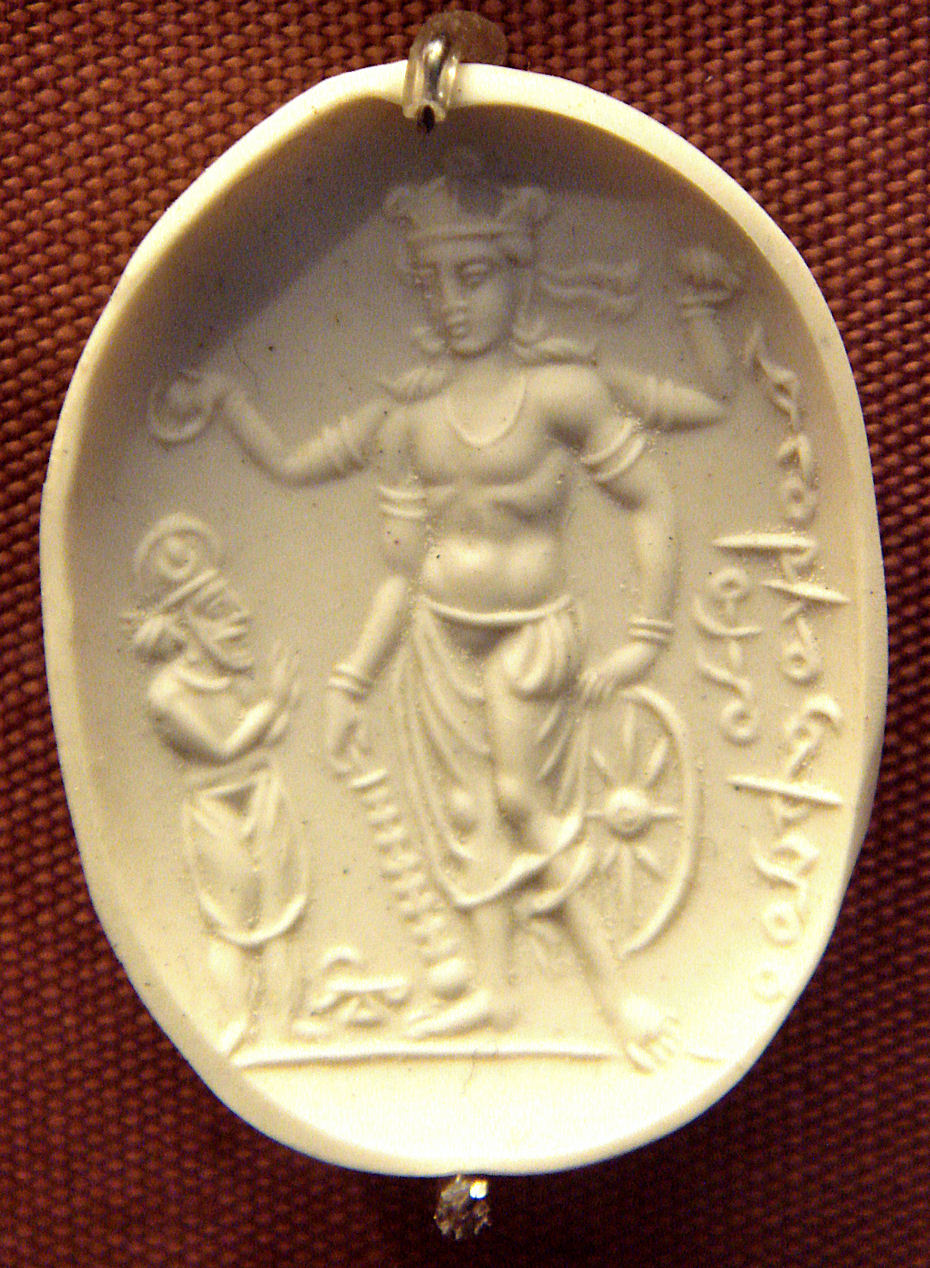
Cast of sardonyx seal representing Vishnu blessing a worshiper 4th-6th century CE. The inscription in cursive Bactrian reads: "Mihira, Vishnu and Shiva".

=== Ancient era ===
The Gandharan civilization features prominently in the Hindu epic poem, the Mahabharatha, The Vedic texts refer to the area as the province of Pushkalavati. The area was once known to be a great center of learning.

=== Medieval era ===
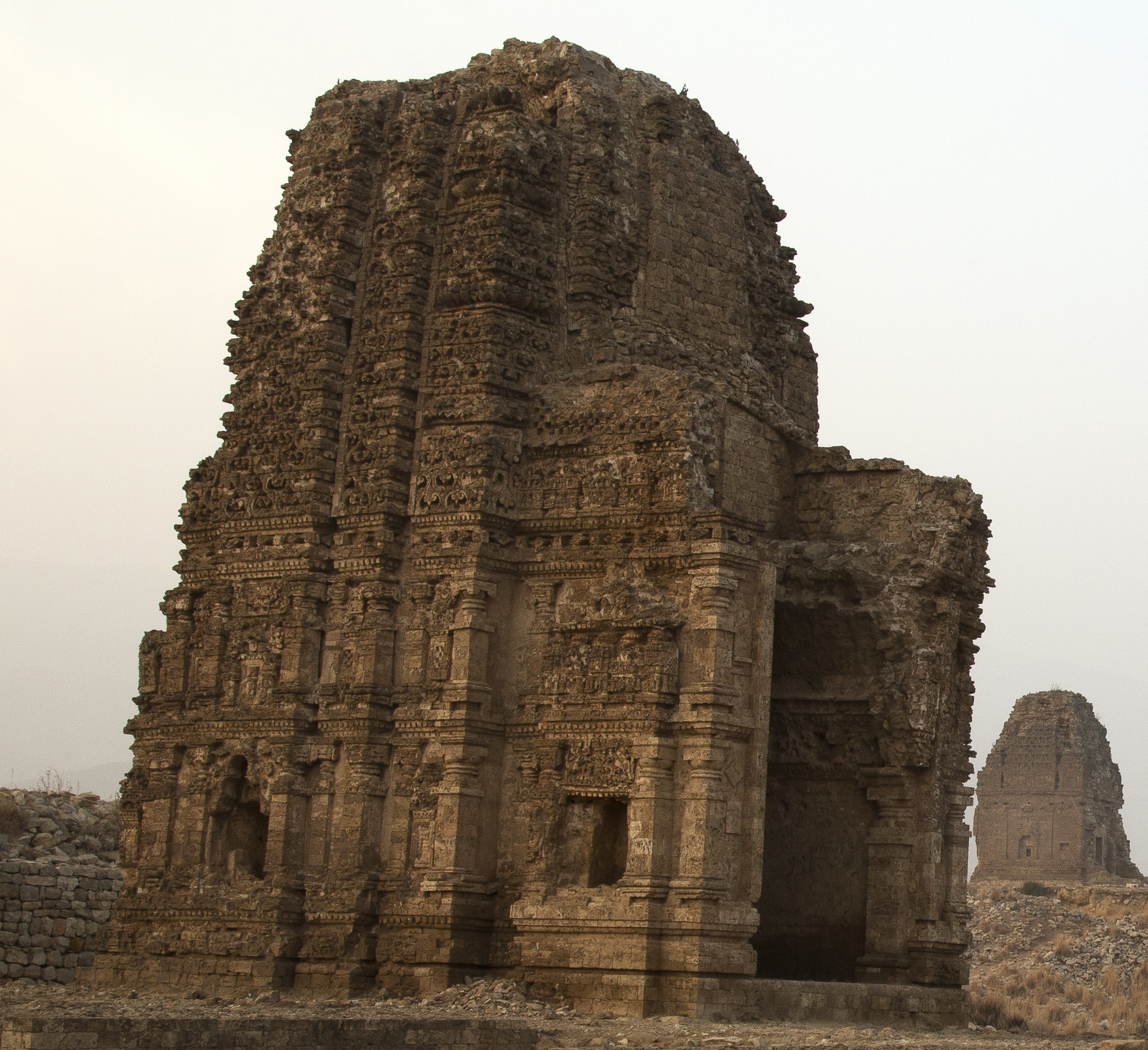
Kafir Kot Temple ruins (Note: Temple D—per Meiser's designations—near the main gateway to the north. The complex has four temples.) in Dera Ismail Khan District

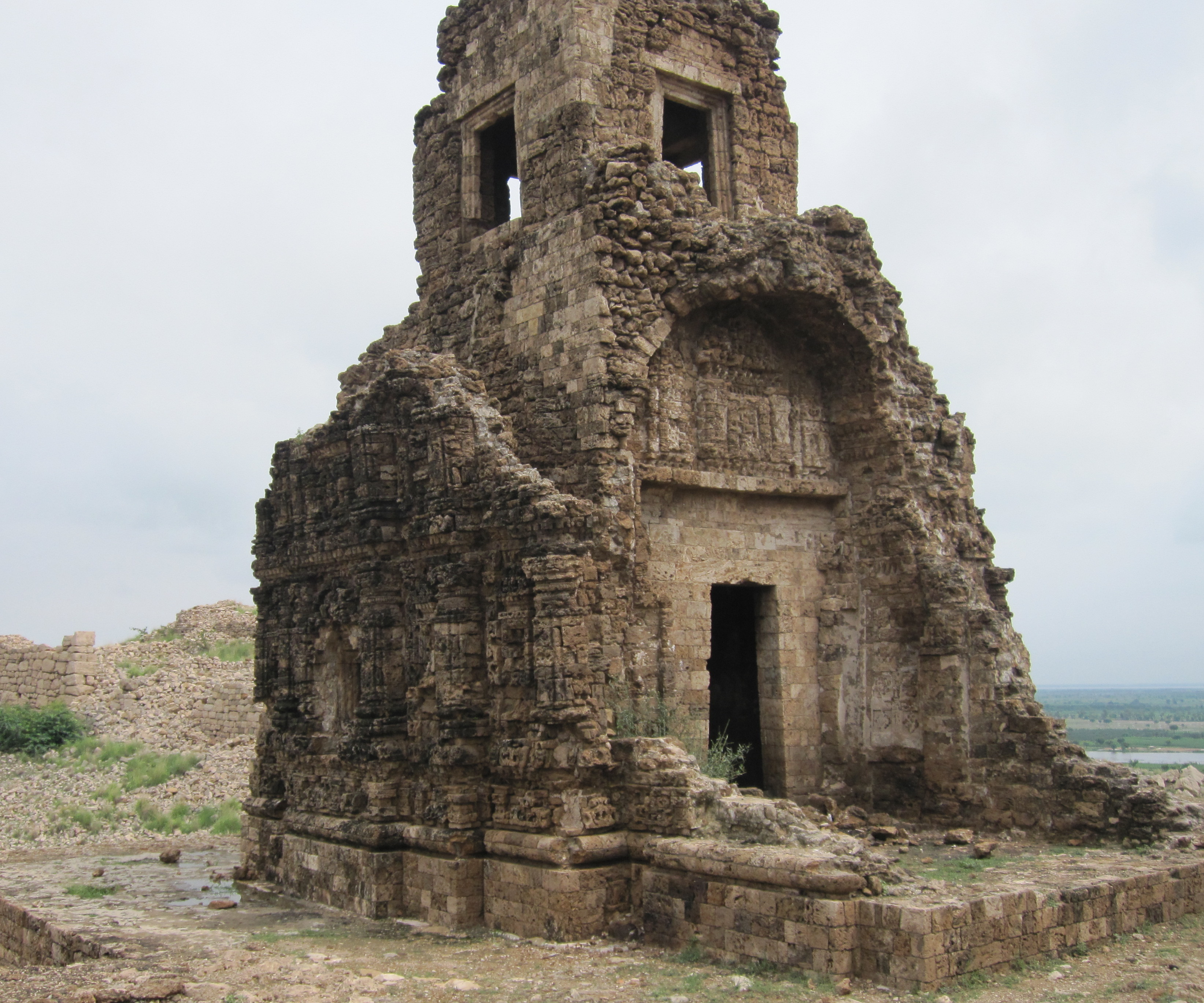
Bilot Temple ruins (Note: Temple B, per Meiser's designations. The complex has eight temples.) in Dera Ismail Khan District

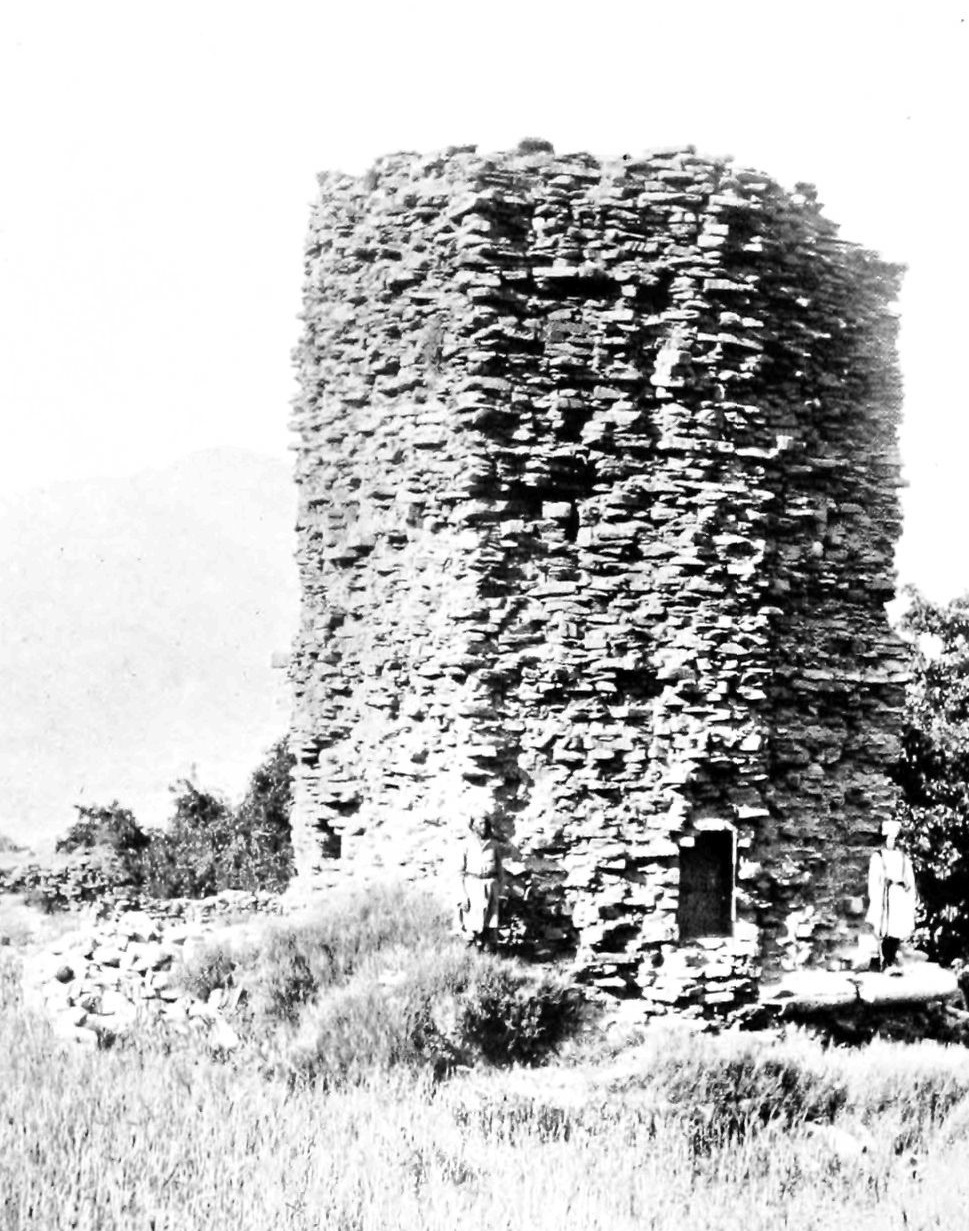
Gumbat Temple ruins in Kohat District

In the first millennium CE, the Khyber Pakhtunkhwa region was ruled by Hindu-Buddhist Turk Shahi and Hindu Shahi dynasties. During the rule of the Shahis, the Khyber Pakhtunkhwa region was a center of trade. Textiles, gems, and perfumes, as well as other goods had been exported west and into central Asia.

The Shahis were known for their many Hindu temples. These temples were mostly looted and destroyed by later invaders. The ruins of these temples can be found at Nandana, Malot, Siv Ganga, Katas, or Amb, as well as across the west bank of the Indus river at the foothills of the Sulaiman and Hindu Kush mountain ranges, such as at Kafir Kot, Bilot Sharif, or Gumbat. At the height of Shahi rule under king Jayapala, the kingdom had extended to Kabul and Bajaur to the northwest, Multan to the south, and the plains of Punjab to the east. Jayapala, threatened from the consolidation of power by the Ghaznavid dynasty, invaded their capital city of Ghazni. This had initiated the Muslim Ghaznavid and Hindu Shahi struggles.

Over time, Mahmud of Ghazni had pushed further into the subcontinent, as far as east as modern day Agra. During his campaigns, many Hindu temples and Buddhist monasteries had been looted and destroyed, as well as many people being forcibly converted into Islam. Local Pashtun and Dardic tribes converted to Islam, while retaining some of the pre-Islamic Hindu-Buddhist and Animist local traditions such as Pashtunwali and the Attan.

=== Colonial era ===
During the colonial era, census reports detailed that much of the indigenous Hindu population in the North-West Frontier Province chiefly belonged to castes and tribes involved in trade such as the Arora, Bhatia, Bhatiara, or Khatri, while others formed part of tribes primarily engaged in agriculture or the military including the Gurjar and Mohyal Brahmin; many of whom form portions of contemporary ethnolinguistic groups such as the Hindkowans, Hazarewals, Kohistanis, or Saraikis.

In a similar manner to the Baloch Hindus to the south, Hindus belonging to the various castes and tribes who were indigenous to the frontier regions had considerable Islamic influence, owing to their status as a religious minority in the region for centuries, and thus formed religious syncretism that incorporated aspects from both faiths into their cultures and traditions. Furthermore, caste differentiation amongst the Hindus of the region was often greatly diminished, in contrast with the Hindus of regions further to the east in the Gangetic plain such as eastern Punjab or the United Provinces.

"The names returned as those of Hindu sects are very numerous amounting in all to 359 different entries. Many of those are caste and tribes such as Agarwal, Arora, Brahman, Bhat, Bhatiara, Chamar, Chuhra, Dhobi, Dogra, Gorkha, Jat, Meo and the like. Some indicate occupations of occupational castes as for instance, Zamindar, Mahajan, Bhishti, Mallah, Nai and Hajjam. A good many more are clan or family names like Kapoor, Sarsut, Muhial, Utradi and Janjua."
"Hinduism, as it exists in the North-West Frontier Province, is but a pale reflection of the system which flourishes in the United Provinces and other areas to the east. Even of the Derajat, where, as we have seen, the Hindu population is proportionately most numerous, the writer of the Dera Ismail Khan Gazetteer notes, "the Hindus of this district are less particular in the matter of caste prejudices and observances than down country Hindus. Most of them will drink water that has been carried in Mussaks (skins for carrying water) or out of lotas detached from a working well. They habitually ride on donkeys and do a multitude of other things which an orthodox Hindu would shrink from. All idolatrous observances are kept very much in the background. Except a few small images (thakurs) kept in their mandirs they have no idols at all. Nor is it their habit to take their gods about in procession. No one, in fact, sees anything of their worship. They burn their dead, and throw the ashes into the Indus. They always keep a few of the bones, and take them, when the opportunity offers, to the Ganges... There are a good many dharamsalas, mandirs, and dawaras at Dera Ismail Khan and in the cis-Indus tehsils"."
"The marriage customs of the Hindus have been influenced by Islam, notably in regard to the age of marriage... Hindu rules regarding commensality between different castes have been relaxed... any distinct caste organization is virtually non-existent in rural areas. Outside the towns Hindus still live in a condition of dependance on their Mohammadan overlords. The Arora, the Khatri, or the Bhatia shop-keeper in a village is a hamsaya of the proprietors of the land; that is to say, he lives rent free in a house which does not belong to him, and in return for this, and for being allowed to reside unmolested in the village, has to render certain services to his protectors."

— Excerpts from the Census of India (North-West Frontier Province), 1911 AD

Traditionally, Hindu members of the castes and tribes who were indigenous to the frontier regions of the Indian subcontinent (between the Indus River, Sulaiman range, and the Hindu Kush mountains) had longstanding trading relationships with Afghanistan along with other regions of western and central Asia, which they linked with the Indo-Gangetic Plain of India. Conversely, most of the Hindu migrants in the North-West Frontier Province were involved with the military, primarily concentrated in town cantonments.

"In Hazara, the northernmost district of the Province, the proportion of Hindus to the total population is the smallest (4 per cent). The reason is not far to seek. The Hindus in the Province, are, in the main, dependent upon trade and military service, as the bulk of the Musalman population is supported by agriculture. There are no important centres of trade in Hazara, nor has it any turbulent tribes on its border, as is the case with all trans-Indus districts. The permanent location of certain Gurkha regiments at Abbottabad may be traced to climatic considerations rather than to any military necessity. From the military point of view as well as from the point of view of trade and commerce, Hazara occupies the least important position in the Province and this accounts for the small percentage of Hindu population in this district."
"Next to Dera Ismail Khan, Bannu contains the largest proportion of Hindus and the head-quarters town, Edwardesabad [Bannu], is the only town in the Province where the bulk of the population is Hindu. Practically the whole of internal trade of the district and external trade with the Tochi Agency and through it with Afghanistan is in the hands of the Hindus, who have therefore settled in large numbers at Edwardesabad [Bannu] which is a growing town."
"Dera Ismail Khan has always had the distinction of having the largest proportion of Hindu population. During the last decade the Hindus of no other district showed such improvement in numbers as was noticed in this district (37 per cent). The Powinda trade through the Gomal Pass, which is entirely in the hands of Hindus, is mainly responsible for the large indigenous Hindu population of the district. About 43 per cent of the total Hindus in the district reside at the head-quarters town, which is the chief centre of the Powinda trade."

— Excerpts from the Census of India (North-West Frontier Province), 1921 AD

Immediately prior to 1947 Partition of India, the British held a referendum in the NWFP to allow voters to choose between joining India or Pakistan and 99.02% votes were cast in favor of Pakistan. After the independence of Pakistan in 1947, most of the Hindus left for India.

== Demographics ==
Hinduism in Khyber Pakhtunkhwa (1855–2023)
Census year	Hindu Population	Hindu Percentage	Total Responses	Total Population	Source(s)
1855 Census (Punjab Province)	110,602 (Note: At the time of enumeration, only two religious categories broadly existed, including one response for Dharmic faiths, referred to as Hindoo; the other category included one response for Abrahamic and other faiths, referred to as Mahomedan and others non Hindoo.)	9.14%	1,209,736	1,209,736	
1868 Census (Punjab Province)	141,441 (Note: Including total Chamar & Chuhra populations, enumerated separately during the 1868 census.)	8.23%	1,718,200	1,718,200	
1881 Census in British India	154,081	7.88%	1,955,515	1,955,515	
1891 Census in British India	166,984	7.32%	2,281,708	2,281,708	
1901 Census in British India	129,306	6.31%	2,050,724	2,125,480	
1911 Census in British India	119,942	5.46%	2,196,933	3,819,027	
1921 Census in British India	149,881	6.66%	2,251,340	5,076,476	
1931 Census in British India	142,977	5.9%	2,425,076	4,684,364	
1941 Census in British India	180,321	5.94%	3,038,067	5,415,666	
1951 Pakistani Census	2,432 (Note: 1951, 1961, 1972, 1981, 1998, 2017, 2023: Including Jāti (Castes) and Scheduled Castes.)	0.04%	5,864,550	5,899,905	
1961 Pakistani Census	1,474	0.02%	7,578,186	7,599,627	
1972 Pakistani Census	5,014	0.06%	8,032,324	10,879,781	
1981 Pakistani Census	5,253	0.04%	13,259,875	13,259,875	
1998 Pakistani Census	7,011	0.03%	20,919,976	20,919,976	
2017 Pakistani census	6,373	0.02%	35,501,964	35,501,964	
2023 Pakistani census	6,102	0.02%	40,641,120	40,856,097	
—Total responses during all colonial–era (1855, 1868, 1881, 1891, 1901, 1911, 1921, 1931, and 1941) census counts amalgamate all districts of North-West Frontier Province at the time, including Hazara, Mardan, Peshawar, Kohat, Bannu, and Dera Ismail Khan. —All colonial–era census counts did not enumerate religious affiliation in the Federally Administered Tribal Areas alongside Amb, Chitral, Dir, Phulra and Swat princely states. —Religious affiliation was not enumerated in the Federally Administered Tribal Areas during one modern–era census count (1972). —Total responses in all other modern–era (1951, 1961, 1981, 1998, 2017, 2023) census counts are an amalgamation of the North-West Frontier Province and Federally Administered Tribal Areas. Both administrative divisions would ultimately merge to form Khyber Pakhtunkhwa in 2018.

=== Colonial era ===
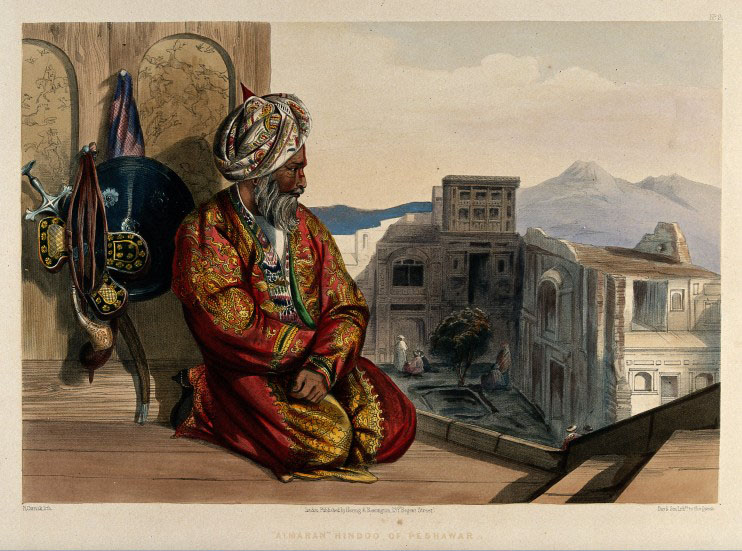
Atma Ram in Peshawar, circa 1847

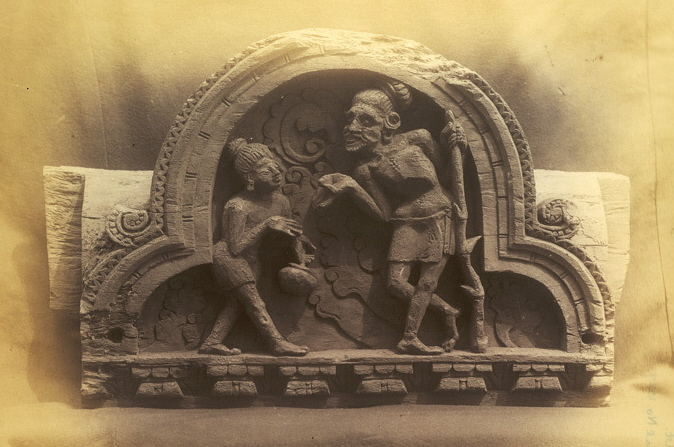
Ancient Hindu wood carving from Kashmir Smast in Peshawar District, 1880s

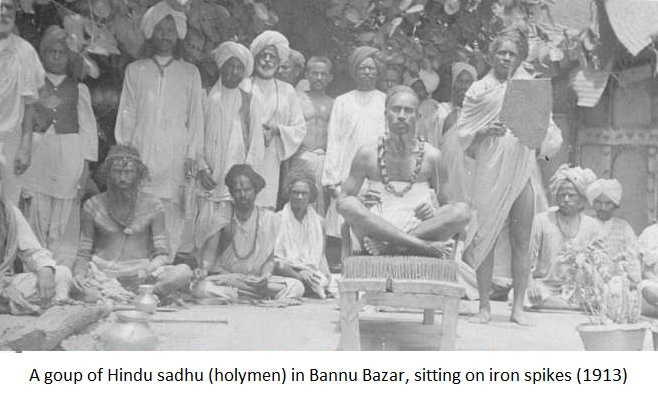
Hindu Sadhus at the Bannu Bazaar, 1913

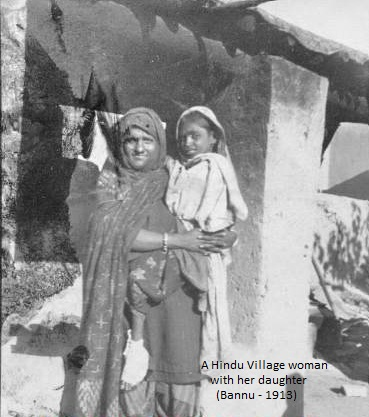
Hindu village woman and daughter in Bannu District, 1913

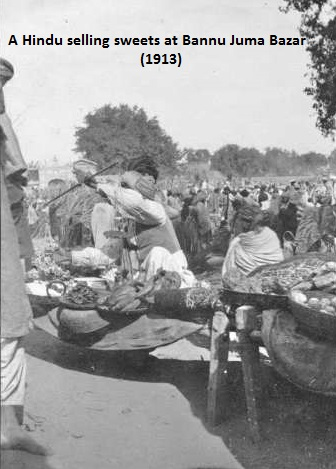
Hindu selling sweets at the Bannu Juma Bazaar, 1913

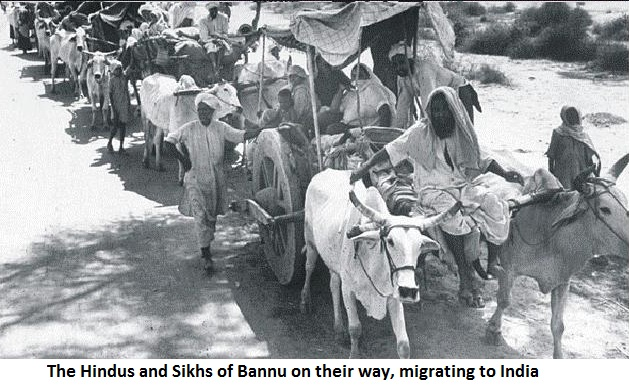
Hindus and Sikhs of Bannu migrating to India during the partition of 1947.

During the colonial era (British India), prior to the partition in 1947, decadal censuses enumerated religion in North-West Frontier Province, and not in the Federally Administered Tribal Areas. Both administrative divisions later amalgamated to become Khyber Pakhtunkhwa.

According to the 1881 census, the Hindu population in North-West Frontier Province (part of the region that composes contemporary Khyber Pakhtunkhwa) was approximately 154,081, or 7.9 percent of the total population. The census conducted in 1921 indicated the Hindu population stood at 149,881 persons, or 6.7 percent of the total population of the province. According to the 1941 census, the Hindu population in North-West Frontier Province (part of the region that composes contemporary Khyber Pakhtunkhwa) was approximately 180,321, or 5.9 percent of the total population.

At the district level in North-West Frontier Province, as per the 1881 census, the largest Hindu concentrations existed in Dera Ismail Khan District (Hindus formed 12.33 percent of the total population and numbered 54,446 persons), Bannu District (9.21 percent or 30,643 persons), and Peshawar District (6.63 percent or 39,321 persons).

As per the 1921 census, at the district level in North-West Frontier Province, the largest Hindu concentrations existed in Dera Ismail Khan District (Hindus formed 15.08 percent of the total population and numbered 39,311 persons), Bannu District (9.53 percent or 23,509 persons), and Kohat District (6.01 percent or 12,879 persons).

According to the 1941 census, at the district level in North-West Frontier Province, the largest Hindu concentrations existed in Dera Ismail Khan District (Hindus formed 13.14 percent of the total population and numbered 39,167 persons), Bannu District (10.63 percent or 31,471 persons), and Kohat District (6.06 percent or 17,527 persons).

Hindus in the districts of North–West Frontier Province (1881–1941)
District	1881		1921		1931		1941	
District	Pop.	%	Pop.	%	Pop.	%	Pop.	%
Dera Ismail Khan District	54,446	12.33%	39,311	15.08%	35,822	13.07%	39,167	13.14%
Peshawar District	39,321	6.63%	48,144	5.31%	42,321	4.34%	51,212	6.01%
Bannu District	30,643	9.21%	23,509	9.53%	26,181	9.69%	31,471	10.63%
Hazara District	19,843	4.87%	26,038	4.18%	25,260	3.77%	30,267	3.8%
Kohat District	9,828	5.41%	12,879	6.01%	13,393	5.67%	17,527	6.06%
Mardan District	—N/a	—N/a	—N/a	—N/a	—N/a	—N/a	10,677	2.11%
Total Hindus	154,081	7.88%	149,881	6.66%	142,977	5.9%	180,321	5.94%
Total Population	1,955,515	100%	2,251,340	100%	2,425,076	100%	3,038,067	100%

At the tehsil level in North-West Frontier Province, as per the 1921 census, the largest Hindu concentrations existed in Tank Tehsil (Hindus formed 17.14 percent of the total population and numbered 10,224 persons) Dera Ismail Khan Tehsil (15.82 percent or 24,685 persons), Bannu Tehsil (11.32 percent or 16,130 persons), Kulachi Tehsil (9.76 percent or 4,402 persons), and Peshawar Tehsil (9.65 percent or 25,414 persons).

According to the 1941 census, at the tehsil level in North-West Frontier Province, the largest Hindu concentrations existed in Dera Ismail Khan Tehsil (Hindus formed 16.03 percent of the total population and numbered 30,065 persons), Bannu Tehsil (13.07 percent or 24,517 persons), Hangu Tehsil (9.52 percent or 5,909 persons), Tank Tehsil (9.48 percent or 5,279 persons), and Peshawar Tehsil (8.62 percent or 33,551 persons).

Hindus in the tehsils of North–West Frontier Province (1921–1941)
Tehsil	1921		1931		1941	
Tehsil	Pop.	%	Pop.	%	Pop.	%
Peshawar Tehsil	25,414	9.65%	23,538	8.44%	33,551	8.62%
Dera Ismail Khan Tehsil	24,685	15.82%	25,982	15.19%	30,065	16.03%
Bannu Tehsil	16,130	11.32%	17,789	10.99%	24,517	13.07%
Abbottabad Tehsil	13,580	5.85%	13,378	5.27%	17,558	5.69%
Nowshera Tehsil	10,638	7.15%	9,271	5.77%	15,128	6.93%
Tank Tehsil	10,224	17.14%	5,109	9.98%	5,279	9.48%
Marwat Tehsil	7,379	7.08%	8,392	7.74%	6,954	6.42%
Haripur Tehsil	7,362	4.54%	7,016	4.13%	7,278	3.87%
Mardan Tehsil	6,846	3.99%	5,941	2.99%	8,709	2.91%
Kohat Tehsil	6,415	8.31%	7,615	8.62%	9,156	7.99%
Mansehra Tehsil	4,592	2.29%	4,308	2.06%	4,910	2.02%
Kulachi Tehsil	4,402	9.76%	4,731	9.12%	3,823	6.97%
Hangu Tehsil	4,225	9.45%	2,990	6.65%	5,909	9.52%
Swabi Tehsil	3,063	1.92%	1,426	0.9%	1,968	0.95%
Teri Tehsil	2,239	2.43%	2,788	2.71%	2,462	2.18%
Charsadda Tehsil	2,183	1.33%	2,145	1.21%	2,533	1.04%
Amb Tehsil	440	2.02%	509	1.63%	433	0.9%
Phulra Tehsil	64	1.12%	49	0.74%	88	1.01%
Total Hindus	149,881	6.66%	142,977	5.9%	180,321	5.94%
Total Population	2,251,340	100%	2,425,076	100%	3,038,067	100%

According to the 1921 census, the Hindu population in urban portions of North-West Frontier Province numbered 94,662 persons, or 28.2 percent of the total urban population. Cities/urban areas in North-West Frontier Province with the largest Hindu concentrations included Bannu (Hindus formed 59.4 percent of the total population and numbered 13,222 persons), Abbottabad (53.94 percent or 7,346 persons), Jamrud (50.82 percent or 3,114 persons), Haripur (44.76 percent or 2,636 persons), and Dera Ismail Khan (43.41 percent or 17,077 persons).

The Hindu population in urban portions of North-West Frontier Province as per the 1941 census was 134,382 persons, or 24.3 percent of the total urban population. Cities/urban areas in North-West Frontier Province with the largest Hindu concentrations included Bannu (Hindus formed 57.59 percent of the total population and numbered 22,175 persons), Dera Ismail Khan (44.47 percent or 22,815 persons), Risalpur (43.71 percent or 3,937 persons), Abbottabad (43.34 percent or 11,886 persons), and Lakki (36.58 percent or 3,710 persons).

Hindus in the cities of North-West Frontier Province (1921–1941)
City/Urban Area	1921		1931		1941	
City/Urban Area	Pop.	%	Pop.	%	Pop.	%
Peshawar (Note: Includes total Municipality and Cantonment population.)	20,981	20.09%	21,973	18.03%	31,630	18.24%
Dera Ismail Khan	17,077	43.41%	16,761	41.56%	22,815	44.47%
Bannu	13,222	59.4%	15,036	49.24%	22,175	57.59%
Abbottabad	7,346	53.94%	7,753	47.96%	11,886	43.34%
Nowshera (Note: Includes total Cantonment and Notified area population.)	6,192	22.32%	4,675	16.14%	9,831	22.33%
Kohat	5,796	20.81%	6,709	19.53%	8,250	18.34%
Tank (Note: Includes total Notified area population.)	4,197	38.7%	2,244	34.95%	3,296	36.26%
Risalpur	3,369	39.64%	2,900	36.18%	3,937	43.71%
Mardan	3,220	29.46%	3,605	13.72%	5,851	13.77%
Jamrud	3,114	50.82%	—N/a	—N/a	—N/a	—N/a
Haripur	2,636	44.76%	2,693	35.19%	3,113	33.39%
Lakki	2,543	34.02%	2,805	36.41%	3,710	36.58%
Kulachi	2,162	27.38%	2,182	25.9%	2,092	23.67%
Nawan Shehr	1,052	20.66%	883	17.21%	1,030	16.06%
Baffa	861	11.32%	762	10.5%	735	9.2%
Charsadda	484	4.73%	519	4.5%	745	4.42%
Tangi	314	3.19%	362	4.17%	444	3.44%
Cherat	80	30.65%	158	18.74%	30	8.9%
Parang	16	0.16%	16	0.16%	2	0.01%
Mansehra	—N/a	—N/a	1,091	18.88%	1,699	16.63%
Kot Najibullah	—N/a	—N/a	—N/a	—N/a	929	17.48%
Utmanzai	—N/a	—N/a	—N/a	—N/a	182	1.8%
Total Urban Hindu Population	94,662	28.19%	93,127	24.12%	134,382	24.34%
Total Urban Population	335,849	100%	386,177	100%	552,193	100%

=== Modern era ===
According to the 1998 Census, there are 5,090 Hindus (including the Scheduled Castes) constituting 0.029% of the population of Khyber Pakhtunkhwa.

In the 2017 Census, there were 5,392 Hindus constitutes 0.015% of the population. In 2023 Census, the absolute number of Hindus increased slightly to 6102, which constitute 0.015% of the population. However, Pakistan Hindu Council estimates that there are 21,033 Hindus in Khyber Pakhtunkhwa.

Hindus in the administrative divisions in Khyber Pakhtunkhwa (1951–2023)
District	1951		2017		2023	
District	Pop.	%	Pop.	%	Pop.	%
Peshawar District (Note: Including Peshawar District and Peshawar Tribal Area/Frontier Region; the former was located in erstwhile North-West Frontier Province, while the latter was located erstwhile Federally Administered Tribal Areas, both regions which amalgamated to form Khyber Pakhtunkhwa in 2018.)	952	0.09%	1,811	0.04%	1,822	0.04%
Swat State/ Swat District	471	0.09%	200	0.01%	117	0%
Kohat District (Note: Including Kohat District and Kohat Tribal Area/Frontier Region; the former was located in erstwhile North-West Frontier Province, while the latter was located erstwhile Federally Administered Tribal Areas, both regions which amalgamated to form Khyber Pakhtunkhwa in 2018.)	387	0.09%	1,004	0.09%	609	0.05%
Bannu District (Note: Including Bannu District and Bannu Tribal Area/Frontier Region; the former was located in erstwhile North-West Frontier Province, while the latter was located erstwhile Federally Administered Tribal Areas, both regions which amalgamated to form Khyber Pakhtunkhwa in 2018.)	242	0.07%	275	0.02%	279	0.02%
Mardan District (Note: Including Mardan District and Mardan Tribal Area/Frontier Region; the former was located in erstwhile North-West Frontier Province, while the latter was located erstwhile Federally Administered Tribal Areas, both regions which amalgamated to form Khyber Pakhtunkhwa in 2018.)	193	0.03%	329	0.01%	379	0.01%
South Waziristan District/Agency	115	0.08%	17	0%	17	0%
Hazara District (Note: Including Hazara District and Hazara Tribal Area/Frontier Region; the former was located in erstwhile North-West Frontier Province, while the latter was located erstwhile Federally Administered Tribal Areas, both regions which amalgamated to form Khyber Pakhtunkhwa in 2018.)	51	0%	—N/a	—N/a	—N/a	—N/a
Dera Ismail Khan District (Note: Including Dera Ismail KhanDistrict and Dera Ismail KhanTribal Area/Frontier Region; the former was located in erstwhile North-West Frontier Province, while the latter was located erstwhile Federally Administered Tribal Areas, both regions which amalgamated to form Khyber Pakhtunkhwa in 2018.)	20	0.01%	642	0.04%	697	0.04%
Kurram District/Agency	1	0%	53	0.01%	56	0.01%
Chitral State/ Chitral District	0	0%	11	0%	—N/a	—N/a
Dir State	0	0%	—N/a	—N/a	—N/a	—N/a
Kalam Region	0	0%	—N/a	—N/a	—N/a	—N/a
Khyber District/Agency	0	0%	72	0.01%	44	0%
Malakand Protected Area	0	0%	77	0.01%	86	0.01%
North Waziristan District/Agency	0	0%	42	0.01%	96	0.01%
Nowshera District	—N/a	—N/a	896	0.06%	862	0.05%
Buner District	—N/a	—N/a	246	0.03%	141	0.01%
Hangu District	—N/a	—N/a	151	0.03%	159	0.03%
Batagram District	—N/a	—N/a	90	0.02%	69	0.01%
Swabi District	—N/a	—N/a	88	0.01%	80	0%
Abbottabad District	—N/a	—N/a	80	0.01%	114	0.01%
Orakzai District/Agency	—N/a	—N/a	70	0.03%	34	0.01%
Lower Dir District	—N/a	—N/a	45	0%	73	0%
Charsadda District	—N/a	—N/a	38	0%	41	0%
Mansehra District	—N/a	—N/a	28	0%	39	0%
Bajaur District/Agency	—N/a	—N/a	16	0%	50	0%
Lakki Marwat District	—N/a	—N/a	16	0%	24	0%
Shangla District	—N/a	—N/a	14	0%	30	0%
Haripur District	—N/a	—N/a	13	0%	50	0%
Kohistan District	—N/a	—N/a	11	0%	—N/a	—N/a
Upper Dir District	—N/a	—N/a	16	0%	42	0%
Mohmand District/Agency	—N/a	—N/a	10	0%	1	0%
Karak District	—N/a	—N/a	7	0%	23	0%
Tank District	—N/a	—N/a	5	0%	2	0%
Torghar District	—N/a	—N/a	0	0%	2	0%
Kolai-Palas Kohistan District	—N/a	—N/a	—N/a	—N/a	30	0.01%
Upper Kohistan District	—N/a	—N/a	—N/a	—N/a	20	0.01%
Lower Kohistan District	—N/a	—N/a	—N/a	—N/a	9	0%
Lower Chitral District	—N/a	—N/a	—N/a	—N/a	4	0%
Upper Chitral District	—N/a	—N/a	—N/a	—N/a	1	0%
Total Hindus	2,432	0.04%	6,373	0.02%	6,102	0.02%
Total responses	5,864,550	99.4%	35,501,964	100%	40,641,120	99.47%
Total population	5,899,905	100%	35,501,964	100%	40,856,097	100%

== Community life ==
In Peshawar, the capital of Khyber Pakhtunkhwa, Hindus enjoy religious freedom and live peacefully alongside the Muslims. The city of Peshawar today is home to four Hindu tribes– the Balmiks, the Rajputs, the Heer Ratan Raths and the Bhai Joga Singh Gurdwara community. Since partition, the four tribes have lived in harmony with all religious communities including Muslims. However, there is the lack of upkeep of the dilapidated Hindu temples in the city. The local government always fails to assign caretakers and priests at temples. But in other parts of Khyber Pakhtunkhwa like Buner, Swat and Aurakzai districts, Hindu and Sikh families have been targeted by the Taliban for failing to pay Jizya (religious tax). Due to this, more than 150 Sikhs and Hindu families in Pakistan's have moved to Hasan Abdal and Rawalpindi in Punjab in 2009.

Tirawal Hindus are a community of Hindus in Peshawar who migrated from the former Federally Administered Tribal Areas due to the conflict in the region. They form a community of about 50 households and are concentrated around Dargah Pir Ratan Nath Jee in the Karimpura Union Council in Peshawar.

The Kalasha people practice an ancient form of Hinduism mixed with animism. They are considered as a separate ethnic religion people by the government of Pakistan. They reside in the Chitral District of Khyber-Pakhtunkhwa province.

== Temples ==
Mansehra Shiv Temple is one of the oldest Hindu temples in Pakistan that is still in existence. It is at least 2000 to 3000 years old. Panj Tirath is another historic Hindu temple in Pakistan. In 2020, Karak temple attack, historic Hindu temple and Samadhi in Karak district was demolished and burnt by a mob of 1,500 local Muslims led by a local Islamic cleric and the supporters of Jamiat Ulema-e-Islam party.

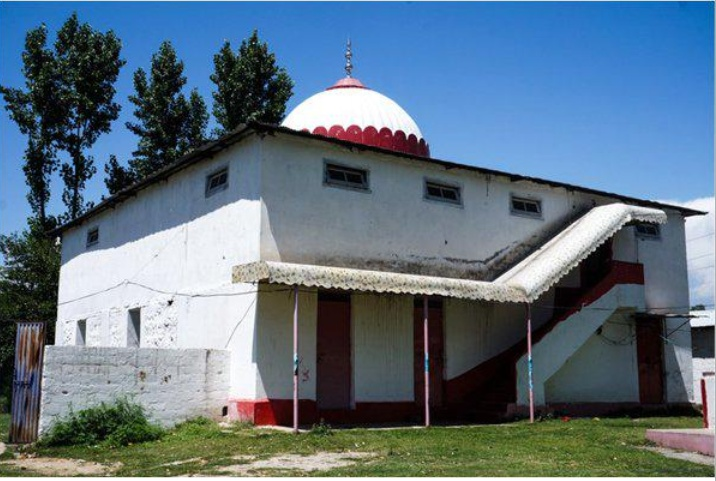
Mansehra Shiva Temple

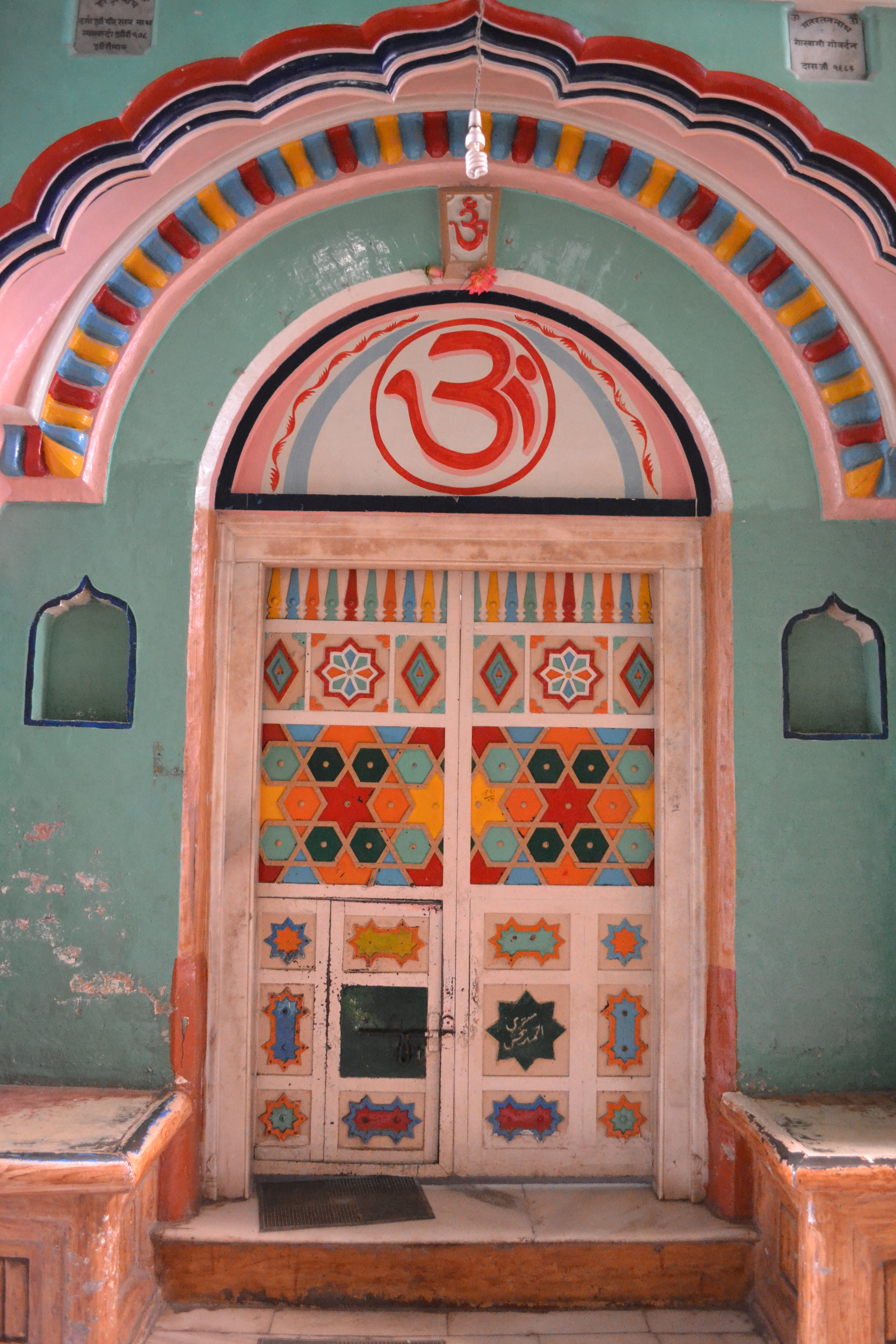
Dargah Pir Ratan Nath Jee

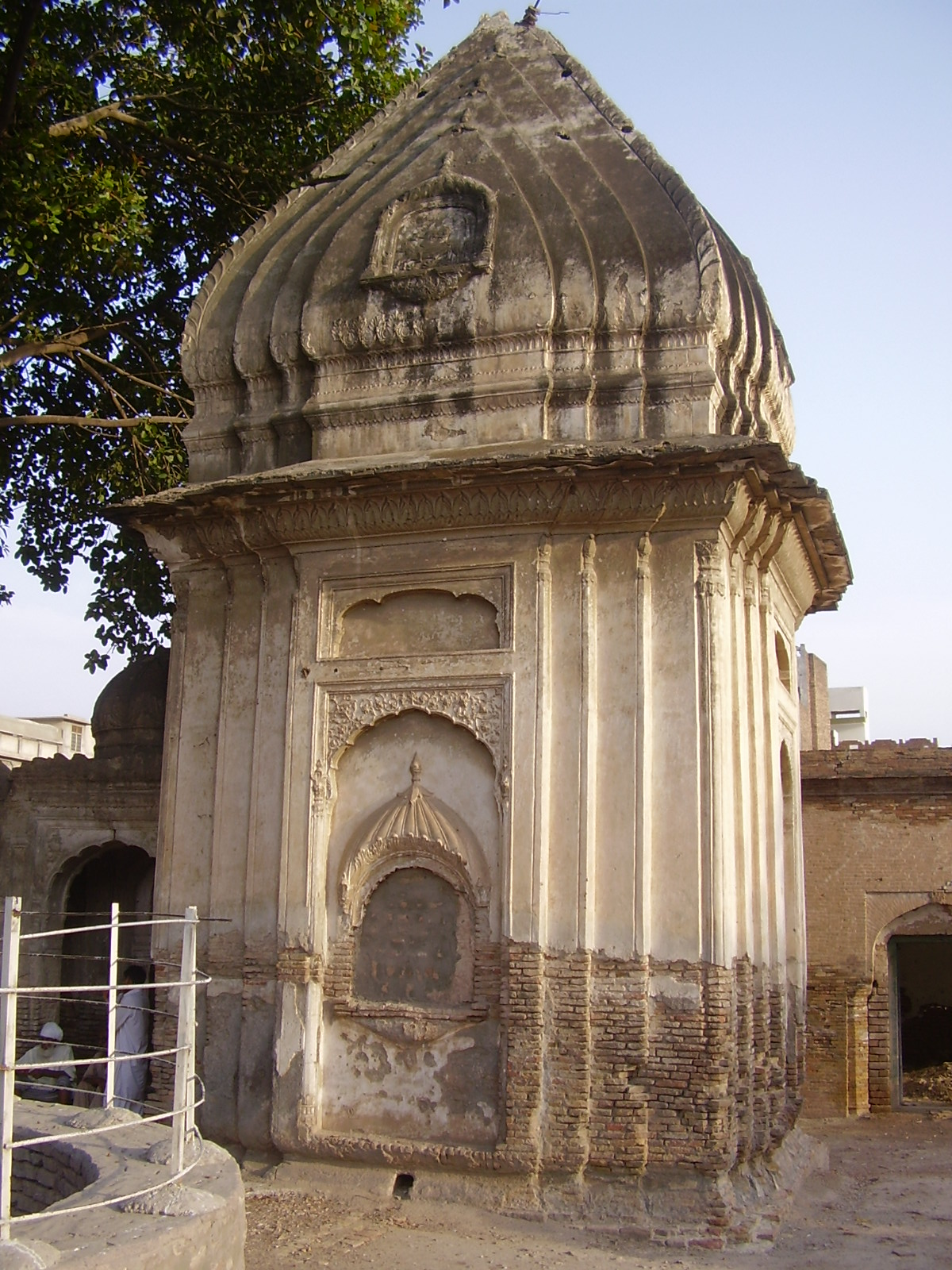
Goraknath Temple
- Kalibari Mandir, Peshawar

== See also ==
- Hinduism in Balochistan
- Hinduism in Islamabad Capital Territory
- Hinduism in Punjab, Pakistan
- Hinduism in Sindh
