= North-West Frontier Province =

Former Province of British India and Pakistan

North-West Frontier Province صوبہ سرحد ṣūbah sarḥad
- 1901–2010
- Top: Flag in Pakistan; Bottom: Flag in British India; Top: Coat of arms (Pakistan); Bottom: Badge (British India)

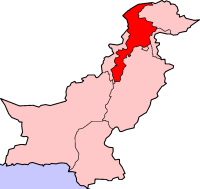
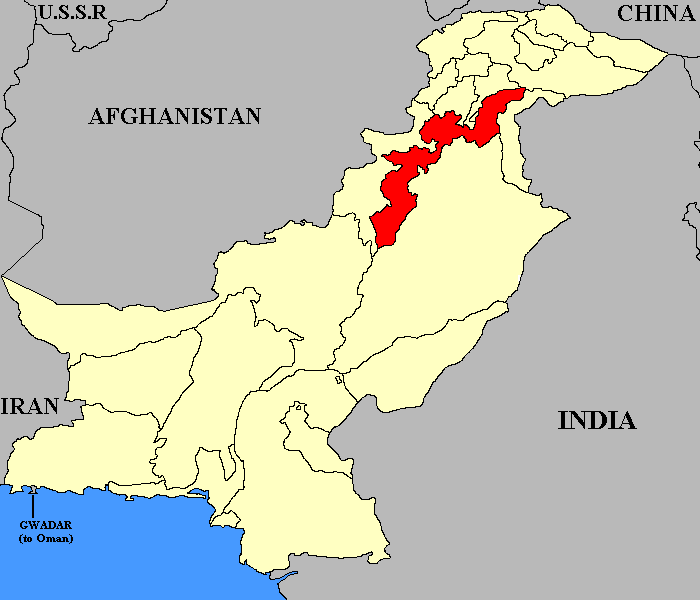
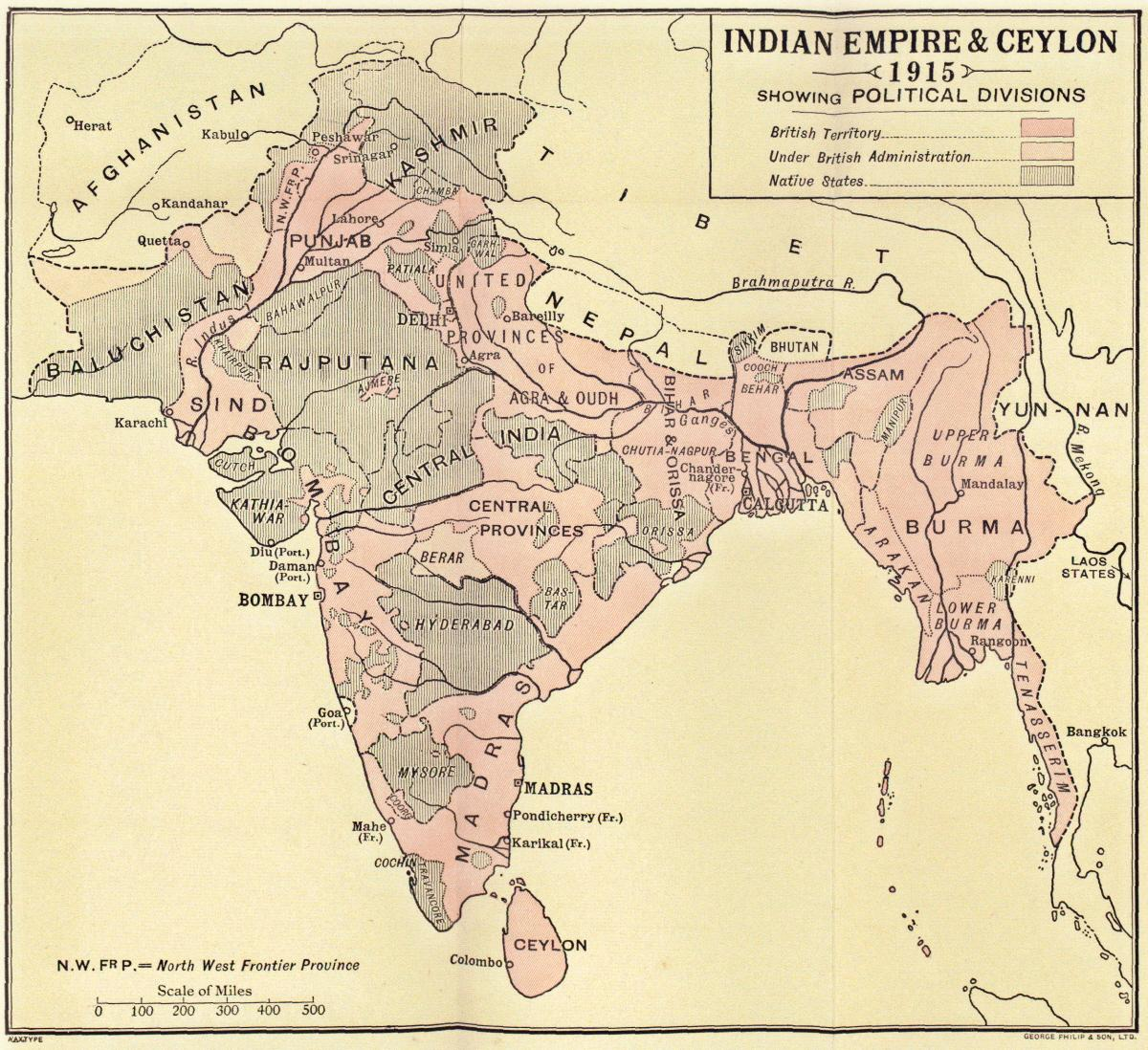
- Status: Chief Commissioner's Province of British India (1901–1932); Governor-led province of British India (1932–1947); Province of Pakistan (1947–1955; 1970–2010)
- Capital: Peshawar
- Official languages: English; Urdu
- Native languages: Pashto; Punjabi (Note: Includes speakers of Western Punjabi (Lahnda) (Hindko-Saraiki: Peshawari, Pahari-Pothwari, Derawali, Chinawab, Multani, Chachhi, Ghebi, Tanoli, Kohati, Awankari, Hariani, and others) and also includes speakers of Standard Punjabi. Both are included as one on table for continuity between censuses, as enumeration results frequently shifted as standardization of the various Punjabi dialects and languages was an ongoing process, with speakers of Standard Punjabi comprising a majority as per the 1911 census, while speakers of Western Punjabi (Lahnda) comprised a majority as per the 1921 and 1931 census.); others
- Demonym: Sarhadī
- Chief Commissioner
  - 1901–1908: Harold Arthur Deane (first)
  - 1931–1932: Ralph Griffith (last)
- Governor
  - 1932–1937: Ralph Griffith (first)
  - 2008–2010 (Note: Continued in Khyber Pakhtunkhwa till 2011): Owais Ahmed Ghani (last)
- Chief Minister
  - 1937: Sahibzada Abdul Qayyum (first)
  - 2008–2010 (Note: Continued in Khyber Pakhtunkhwa till 2013): Haider Khan Hoti (last)
- Legislature: Legislative Council (1932–1937); Provincial Assembly (1937–1955; 1970–2010)
- History
  - Separated from Punjab: 9 November 1901
  - Accession to Pakistan: 14 August 1947
  - Merged into West Pakistan: 14 October 1955
  - Restored: 1 July 1970
  - Renamed: 9 November 2010

Area
- 1970–2010: 74,521 km^{2} (28,773 sq mi)
- 1950–1955: 34,267 km^{2} (13,231 sq mi)
- 1901–1950: 34,169 km^{2} (13,193 sq mi)
- Date format: dd-mm-yyyy
Preceded by
1901: Punjab
1950: Phulra State
1970: West Pakistan
Hazara Tribal Agency
Kohistan Tribal Area
Succeeded by
1955: West Pakistan
2010: Khyber Pakhtunkhwa
- Today part of: Pakistan: Khyber Pakhtunkhwa

The North-West Frontier Province (abbr. NWFP), commonly known as Sarhad (lit. 'Frontier'), was a province of Pakistan from 1947 to 1955 and from 1970 to 2010; (Note: It was dissolved in 1955 under the One Unit Scheme and merged into a unified province of West Pakistan, alongside Baluchistan, Sind, West Punjab, and several princely states. It was restored in 1970 under Legal Framework Order, alongside Balochistan, Punjab, and Sindh, upon the dissolution of the province of West Pakistan.) and prior, a province of British India from its establishment in 1901 to Pakistan's independence in 1947. It was established from the north-western districts of British Punjab during the British Raj. Following the referendum in 1947 to join either Pakistan or India, the province voted hugely in favour of joining Pakistan and it acceded accordingly on 14 August 1947. It was dissolved to form a unified province of West Pakistan in 1955 upon promulgation of One Unit Scheme and was restored in 1970. It was known by this name until 9 November 2010, when it was officially redesignated as the Province of Khyber Pakhtunkhwa following the coming into effect of the Eighteenth Amendment to the Constitution of Pakistan, for which the amendment bill was passed on 15 April 2010, signed into law by the President on 19 April 2010, and officially came into effect on 9 November 2010, coinciding with the completion of 110 years of the province and marking the province's renaming.

The province covered an area of 70,709 km^{2} (27,301 sq mi), including much of the current Khyber Pakhtunkhwa province but excluding the Federally Administered Tribal Areas and the former princely states of Amb, Chitral, Dir, Phulra and Swat. Its capital was the city of Peshawar, and the province was composed of six divisions (Bannu, Dera Ismail Khan, Hazara, Kohat, Mardan, and Peshawar Division; Malakand was later added as the seventh division). Until 1947, the province was bordered by five princely states to the north, the minor states of the Gilgit Agency to the northeast, the province of Punjab to the east and the province of Balochistan to the south. The Kingdom of Afghanistan lay to the northwest, with the Federally Administered Tribal Areas forming a buffer zone between the two.

== History ==
=== Formation ===
The northwestern frontier areas were annexed by the East India Company after the Second Sikh War (1848–49). The territories thenceforth formed a part of Punjab until the province, then known as North West Frontier Province, was created in 1901 from the north-western districts of the Punjab Province. This region, along with the 'Frontier Tribal Areas', acted as a buffer zone with Afghanistan.

The Punjab in 1880 (included areas of the later North-West Frontier Province)

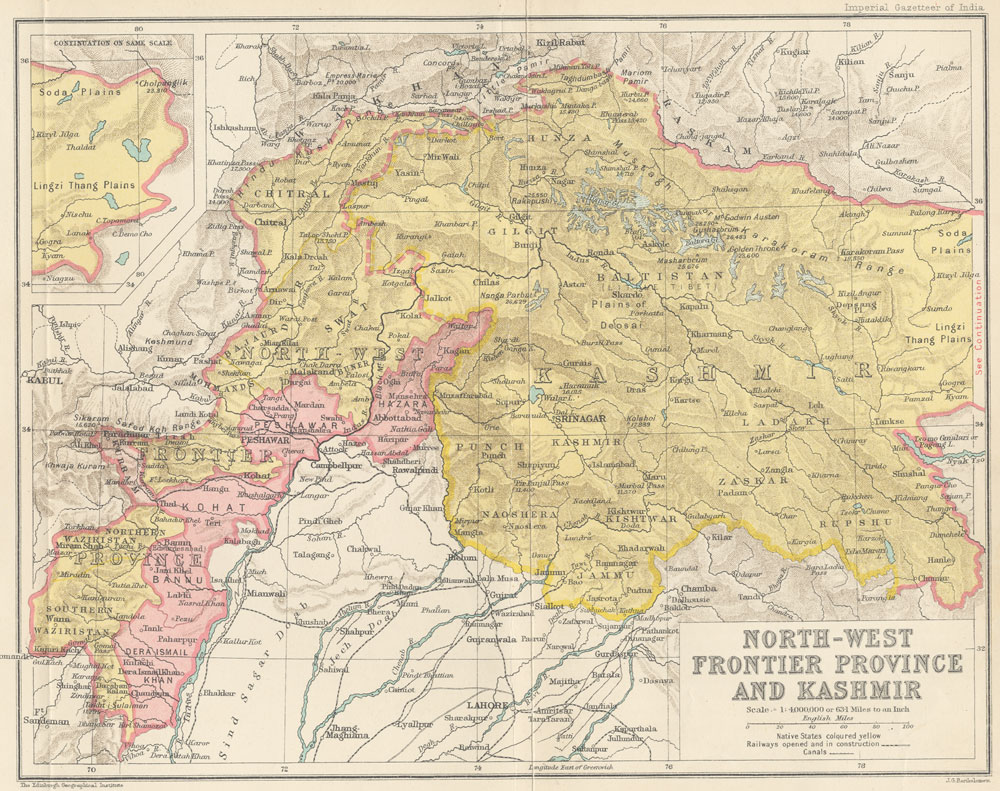
Map of the North-West Frontier Province and Kashmir from The Imperial Gazetteer of India (1907-1909)

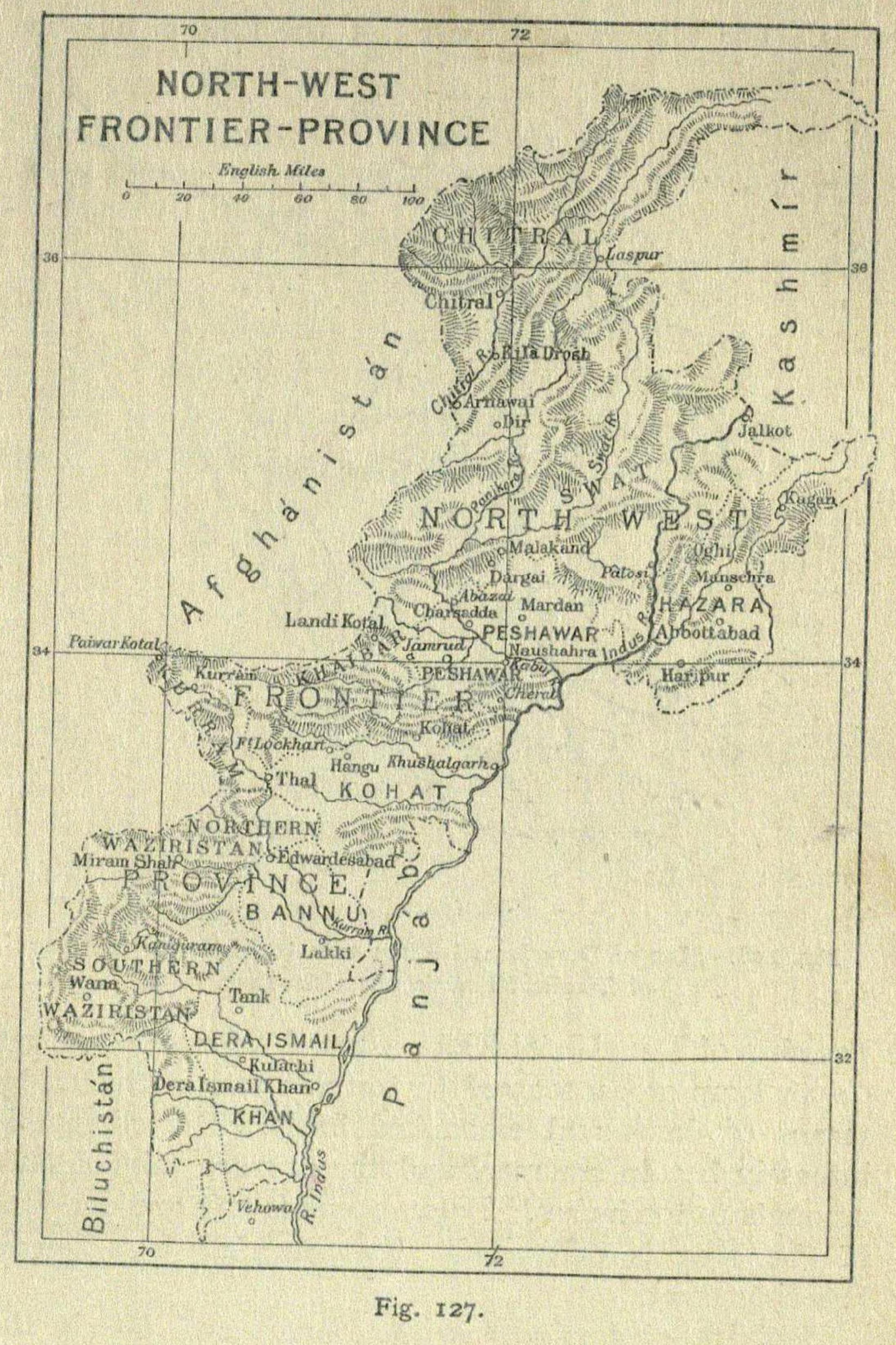
Map of the North-West Frontier Province, British India, published in 'The Panjab, North-West Frontier Province and Kashmir' (1916)

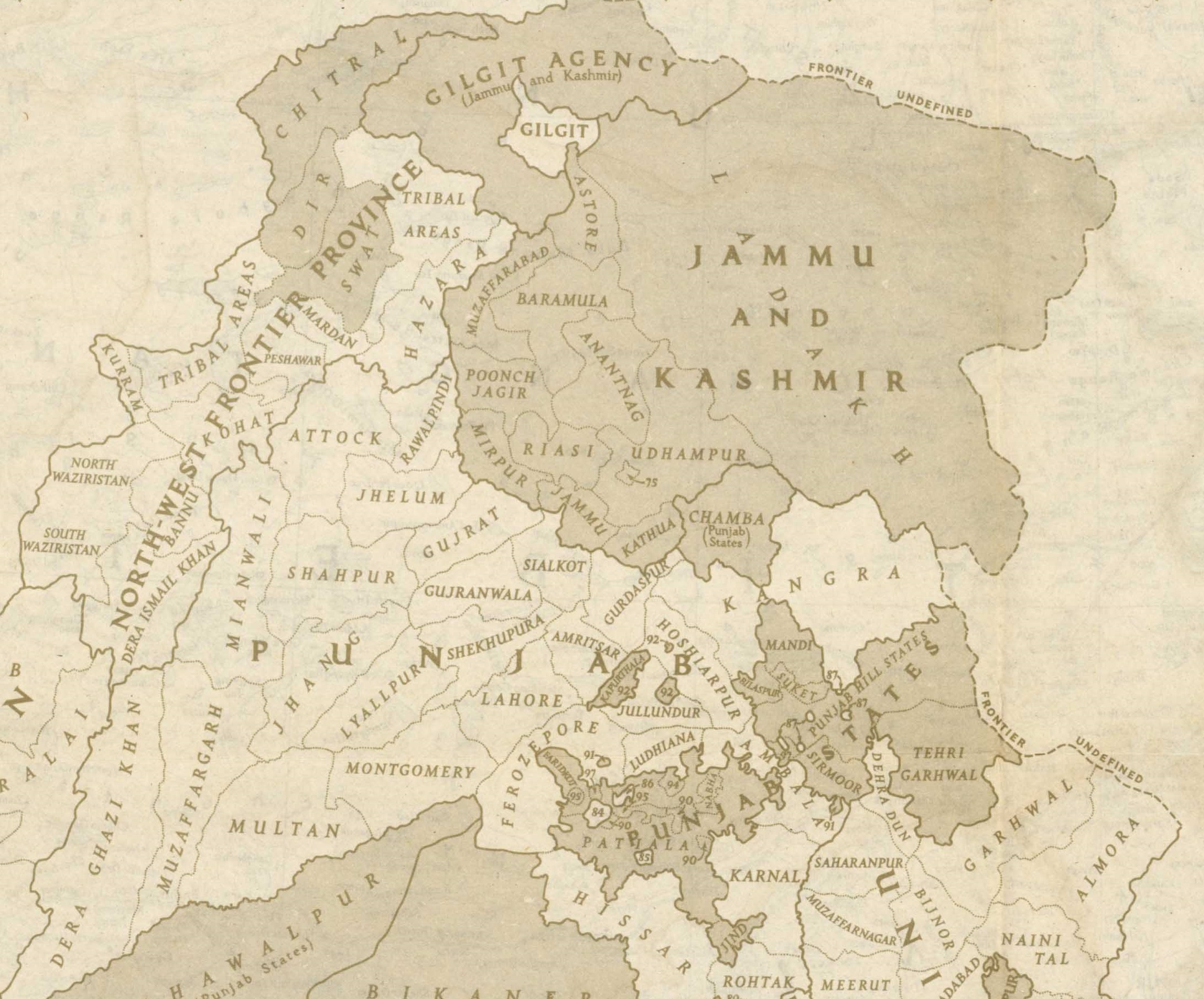
Map of the North-West Frontier Province and neighbouring regions (National Geographic, 1946)

=== Inside Pakistan ===
Before the Partition of India, the 1947 North-West Frontier Province referendum was held in July 1947 to decide the future of NWFP, in which the people of the province decided in favor of joining Pakistan. Chief Minister Dr Khan Sahib, along with his brother Bacha Khan and the Khudai Khidmatgars, boycotted the referendum, citing that it did not have the options of the NWFP becoming independent or joining Afghanistan.

As a separate province, the NWFP lasted until 1955 when it was merged into the new province of West Pakistan, under the One Unit policy announced by Prime Minister Chaudhry Mohammad Ali. It was recreated after the dissolution of the One Unit system and lasted under its old nomenclature until April 2010, when it was renamed the Khyber Pakhtunkhwa province.

== Government ==
The offices of Governor and Chief Minister of the North-West Frontier Province lasted until 14 October 1955.

Tenure	Governors of the North-West Frontier Province
14 August 1947 – 8 April 1948	Sir George Cunningham
8 April 1948 – 16 July 1949	Sir Ambrose Dundas Flux Dundas
16 July 1949 – 14 January 1950	Sahibzada Mohammad Kursheed
14 January 1950 – 21 February 1950	Mohammad Ibrahim Khan Jhagra (acting)
21 February 1950 – 23 November 1951	Ismail Ibrahim Chundrigar
24 November 1951 – 17 November 1954	Khwaja Shahabuddin
17 November 1954 – 14 October 1955	Qurban Ali Khan
14 October 1955	North-West Frontier Province dissolved

Tenure	Chief Ministers of the North-West Frontier Province	Political party
1 April 1937 – 7 September 1937	Sir Sahibzada Abdul Qayyum Khan	Non-party government nominee
7 September 1937 – 10 November 1939	Khan Abdul Jabbar Khan (1st time)	Indian National Congress
10 November 1939 – 25 May 1943	Governor's rule	
25 May 1943 – 16 March 1945	Sardar Aurangzeb Khan	Muslim League
16 March 1945 – 22 August 1947	Khan Abdul Jabbar Khan (2nd time)	Indian National Congress
14 August 1947	Independence of Pakistan	
23 August 1947 – 23 April 1953	Abdul Qayyum Khan Kashmiri	Pakistan Muslim League
23 April 1953 – 18 July 1955	Sardar Abdur Rashid Khan	
19 July 1955 – 14 October 1955	Sardar Bahadur Khan	

== Demographics ==
Population history
Year	Pop.	±% p.a.
1855	1,209,736	—
1868	1,713,596	+2.71%
1881	1,955,515	+1.02%
1891	2,281,708	+1.55%
1901	2,050,724	−1.06%
1911	2,196,933	+0.69%
1921	2,251,340	+0.24%
1931	2,425,076	+0.75%
1941	3,038,067	+2.28%
Source: Census of India

=== Population ===
Historical population, language, and religious counts in North-West Frontier Province were enumerated in all districts (Hazara, Mardan, Peshawar, Kohat, Bannu, and Dera Ismail Khan), detailed in the population, language, and religious tables above and below. Separate population counts were taken in the Agencies and Tribal Areas, as detailed on the respective article page.

At independence, there was a clear Muslim Pashtun, Hindkowan, and Punjabi majority in the North-West Frontier Province, although there were also significant Hindu and Sikh Pashtun, Hindkowan, and Punjabi minorities scattered across the province.

Population of North–West Frontier Province by District (1855–1941)
Census Year	Peshawar District		Dera Ismail Khan District		Hazara District		Bannu District		Kohat District		Mardan District		North-West Frontier Province	
Census Year	Pop.	%	Pop.	%	Pop.	%	Pop.	%	Pop.	%	Pop.	%	Pop.	%
1855	450,099	37.21%	362,041	29.93%	296,364	24.5%	—N/a	—N/a	101,232	8.37%	—N/a	—N/a	1,209,736	100%
1868	523,152	30.53%	394,889	23.04%	365,320	21.32%	284,816	16.62%	145,419	8.49%	—N/a	—N/a	1,713,596	100%
1881	592,674	30.31%	441,649	22.58%	407,075	20.82%	332,577	17.01%	181,540	9.28%	—N/a	—N/a	1,955,515	100%
1891	703,768	30.84%	486,201	21.31%	516,288	22.63%	372,276	16.32%	203,175	8.9%	—N/a	—N/a	2,281,708	100%
1901	788,707	38.46%	252,379	12.31%	560,288	27.32%	231,485	11.29%	217,865	10.62%	—N/a	—N/a	2,050,724	100%
1911	865,009	39.37%	256,120	11.66%	603,028	27.45%	250,086	11.38%	222,690	10.14%	—N/a	—N/a	2,196,933	100%
1921	907,367	40.3%	260,767	11.58%	622,349	27.64%	246,734	10.96%	214,123	9.51%	—N/a	—N/a	2,251,340	100%
1931	974,321	40.18%	274,064	11.3%	670,117	27.63%	270,301	11.15%	236,273	9.74%	—N/a	—N/a	2,425,076	100%
1941	851,833	28.04%	298,131	9.81%	796,230	26.21%	295,930	9.74%	289,404	9.53%	506,539	16.67%	3,038,067	100%

=== Language ===
The languages of the North-West Frontier Province included Pashto, Punjabi, Kohistani and others, although most of the population spoke either Pashto or Western Punjabi (primarily Hindko and Saraiki). Prior to the arrival of the British, the official language, for governmental uses and such, was Persian.

Language in North–West Frontier Province (1881–1931)
Mother Tongue	1881		1891		1901		1911		1921		1931	
Mother Tongue	Pop.	%	Pop.	%	Pop.	%	Pop.	%	Pop.	%	Pop.	%
Punjabi	1,050,061	53.7%	1,226,648	53.76%	876,604	42.75%	916,365	41.71%	1,000,255	44.43%	1,102,905	45.48%
Pashto	870,816	44.53%	1,023,021	44.84%	1,088,606	53.08%	1,221,859	55.62%	1,202,326	53.4%	1,279,471	52.76%
Hindustani	17,645	0.9%	15,686	0.69%	15,598	0.76%	16,995	0.77%	8,814	0.39%	19,221	0.79%
English	4,554	0.23%	5,204	0.23%	4,601	0.22%	5,720	0.26%	9,762	0.43%	7,852	0.32%
Persian	4,028	0.21%	3,962	0.17%	2,851	0.14%	3,454	0.16%	2,352	0.1%	6,030	0.25%
Kashmiri	3,736	0.19%	2,218	0.1%	821	0.04%	533	0.02%	343	0.02%	1,796	0.07%
Balochi	2,510	0.13%	554	0.02%	92	0.004%	—N/a	—N/a	—N/a	—N/a	—N/a	—N/a
Nepali	1,020	0.05%	2,655	0.12%	—N/a	—N/a	5,179	0.24%	4,149	0.18%	5,140	0.21%
Dogri	624	0.03%	336	0.01%	674	0.03%	46	0.002%	—N/a	—N/a	—N/a	—N/a
Sindhi	204	0.01%	101	0.004%	196	0.01%	—N/a	—N/a	7	0.0003%	—N/a	—N/a
Bengali	202	0.01%	106	0.005%	—N/a	—N/a	—N/a	—N/a	217	0.01%	—N/a	—N/a
Tibetan	38	0.002%	—N/a	—N/a	—N/a	—N/a	—N/a	—N/a	—N/a	—N/a	—N/a	—N/a
Turkish	32	0.002%	151	0.01%	—N/a	—N/a	16	0.001%	23	0.001%	62	0.003%
Tamil	23	0.001%	37	0.002%	—N/a	—N/a	—N/a	—N/a	68	0.003%	—N/a	—N/a
Gujarati	16	0.001%	282	0.01%	—N/a	—N/a	97	0.004%	11	0.0005%	—N/a	—N/a
Marathi	1	0.0001%	61	0.003%	—N/a	—N/a	219	0.01%	1	0%	—N/a	—N/a
Arabic	1	0.0001%	17	0.001%	—N/a	—N/a	12	0.001%	54	0.002%	24	0.001%
German	1	0.0001%	10	0.0004%	—N/a	—N/a	5	0.0002%	—N/a	—N/a	3	0.0001%
French	1	0.0001%	4	0.0002%	—N/a	—N/a	4	0.0002%	—N/a	—N/a	9	0.0004%
Chinese	0	0%	2	0.0001%	—N/a	—N/a	2	0.0001%	1	0%	5	0.0002%
Italian	0	0%	2	0.0001%	—N/a	—N/a	—N/a	—N/a	—N/a	—N/a	—N/a	—N/a
Portuguese	0	0%	—N/a	—N/a	—N/a	—N/a	34	0.002%	—N/a	—N/a	14	0.001%
Chitrali	—N/a	—N/a	7	0.0003%	1	0%	41	0.002%	—N/a	—N/a	—N/a	—N/a
Dutch	—N/a	—N/a	2	0.0001%	—N/a	—N/a	—N/a	—N/a	—N/a	—N/a	1	0%
Spanish	—N/a	—N/a	2	0.0001%	—N/a	—N/a	—N/a	—N/a	—N/a	—N/a	1	0%
Oria	—N/a	—N/a	1	0%	—N/a	—N/a	—N/a	—N/a	—N/a	—N/a	—N/a	—N/a
Turanian	—N/a	—N/a	1	0%	—N/a	—N/a	—N/a	—N/a	—N/a	—N/a	—N/a	—N/a
Armenian	—N/a	—N/a	0	0%	—N/a	—N/a	2	0.0001%	—N/a	—N/a	—N/a	—N/a
Russian	—N/a	—N/a	0	0%	—N/a	—N/a	1	0%	—N/a	—N/a	—N/a	—N/a
Greek	—N/a	—N/a	0	0%	—N/a	—N/a	—N/a	—N/a	—N/a	—N/a	2	0.0001%
Gujari	—N/a	—N/a	—N/a	—N/a	53,021	2.59%	25,668	1.17%	22,637	1.01%	596	0.02%
Odki	—N/a	—N/a	—N/a	—N/a	308	0.02%	95	0.004%	—N/a	—N/a	—N/a	—N/a
Purbi	—N/a	—N/a	—N/a	—N/a	—N/a	—N/a	359	0.02%	98	0.004%	—N/a	—N/a
Kohistani	—N/a	—N/a	—N/a	—N/a	—N/a	—N/a	117	0.01%	222	0.01%	377	0.02%
Marwari	—N/a	—N/a	—N/a	—N/a	—N/a	—N/a	49	0.002%	—N/a	—N/a	—N/a	—N/a
Pashayi	—N/a	—N/a	—N/a	—N/a	—N/a	—N/a	16	0.001%	—N/a	—N/a	—N/a	—N/a
Danish	—N/a	—N/a	—N/a	—N/a	—N/a	—N/a	2	0.0001%	—N/a	—N/a	—N/a	—N/a
Irish	—N/a	—N/a	—N/a	—N/a	—N/a	—N/a	1	0%	—N/a	—N/a	1	0%
Welsh	—N/a	—N/a	—N/a	—N/a	—N/a	—N/a	—N/a	—N/a	—N/a	—N/a	19	0.001%
Scotch	—N/a	—N/a	—N/a	—N/a	—N/a	—N/a	—N/a	—N/a	—N/a	—N/a	1	0%
Japanese	—N/a	—N/a	—N/a	—N/a	—N/a	—N/a	—N/a	—N/a	—N/a	—N/a	1	0%
East African Dialects	0	0%	2	0%	—N/a	—N/a	—N/a	—N/a	—N/a	—N/a	—N/a	—N/a
Other Indo-Aryan or Dravidian languages	0	0%	631	0.03%	5,886	0.29%	42	0%	0	0%	1,545	0.06%
Other Asian languages	0	0%	0	0%	206	0.01%	—N/a	—N/a	—N/a	—N/a	—N/a	—N/a
Other European languages	0	0%	0	0%	20	0.001%	—N/a	—N/a	—N/a	—N/a	—N/a	—N/a
Not returned	2	0%	—N/a	—N/a	1,239	0.06%	—N/a	—N/a	—N/a	—N/a	—N/a	—N/a
Total	1,955,515	100%	2,281,708	100%	2,050,724	100%	2,196,933	100%	2,251,340	100%	2,425,076	100%

==== Districts ====
Language in the Districts of North–West Frontier Province (1931)
District	Pashto		Greater Punjabi		Hindustani		English		Persian		Others		Total	
District	Pop.	%	Pop.	%	Pop.	%	Pop.	%	Pop.	%	Pop.	%	Pop.	%
Peshawar District	781,773	80.24%	167,994	17.24%	11,798	1.21%	5,864	0.6%	3,952	0.41%	2,940	0.3%	974,321	100%
Hazara District	29,375	4.38%	630,704	94.12%	4,113	0.61%	257	0.04%	24	0%	5,644	0.84%	670,117	100%
Dera Ismail Khan District	53,643	19.57%	217,561	79.38%	419	0.15%	336	0.12%	1,678	0.61%	427	0.16%	274,064	100%
Bannu District	228,381	84.49%	39,814	14.73%	1,181	0.44%	556	0.21%	13	0%	356	0.13%	270,301	100%
Kohat District	186,299	78.85%	46,832	19.82%	1,710	0.72%	839	0.36%	363	0.15%	230	0.1%	236,273	100%
Total	1,279,471	52.76%	1,102,905	45.48%	19,221	0.79%	7,852	0.32%	6,030	0.25%	9,597	0.4%	2,425,076	100%

Language in the Districts of North–West Frontier Province (1921)
District	Pashto		Greater Punjabi		Gujari		English		Hindustani		Others		Total	
District	Pop.	%	Pop.	%	Pop.	%	Pop.	%	Pop.	%	Pop.	%	Pop.	%
Peshawar District	738,325	81.37%	153,904	16.96%	0	0%	7,137	0.79%	6,041	0.67%	1,960	0.22%	907,367	100%
Hazara District	31,975	5.14%	562,298	90.35%	22,637	3.64%	355	0.06%	445	0.07%	4,639	0.75%	622,349	100%
Dera Ismail Khan District	59,211	22.71%	200,035	76.71%	0	0%	1,237	0.47%	0	0%	284	0.11%	260,767	100%
Bannu District	201,592	81.7%	44,773	18.15%	0	0%	187	0.08%	48	0.02%	134	0.05%	246,734	100%
Kohat District	171,223	79.96%	39,245	18.33%	0	0%	846	0.4%	2,280	1.06%	529	0.25%	214,123	100%
Total	1,202,326	53.4%	1,000,255	44.43%	22,637	1.01%	9,762	0.43%	8,814	0.39%	7,546	0.34%	2,251,340	100%

Language in the Districts of North–West Frontier Province (1911)
District	Pashto		Greater Punjabi		Gujari		Hindustani		English		Others		Total	
District	Pop.	%	Pop.	%	Pop.	%	Pop.	%	Pop.	%	Pop.	%	Pop.	%
Peshawar District	709,465	82.02%	134,962	15.6%	27	0%	11,224	1.3%	5,028	0.58%	4,303	0.5%	865,009	100%
Hazara District	29,151	4.83%	542,131	89.9%	25,641	4.25%	515	0.09%	144	0.02%	5,446	0.9%	603,028	100%
Dera Ismail Khan District	71,015	27.73%	182,139	71.11%	0	0%	2,531	0.99%	247	0.1%	188	0.07%	256,120	100%
Bannu District	218,845	87.51%	29,875	11.95%	0	0%	1,204	0.48%	121	0.05%	41	0.02%	250,086	100%
Kohat District	193,383	86.84%	27,258	12.24%	0	0%	1,521	0.68%	180	0.08%	348	0.16%	222,690	100%
Total	1,221,859	55.62%	916,365	41.71%	25,668	1.17%	16,995	0.77%	5,720	0.26%	10,326	0.47%	2,196,933	100%

Language in the Districts of North–West Frontier Province (1901)
District	Pashto		Greater Punjabi		Gujari		Hindustani		English		Others		Total	
District	Pop.	%	Pop.	%	Pop.	%	Pop.	%	Pop.	%	Pop.	%	Pop.	%
Peshawar District	619,025	78.49%	153,637	19.48%	55	0.01%	8,620	1.09%	4,058	0.51%	3,312	0.42%	788,707	100%
Hazara District	31,564	5.63%	471,474	84.15%	52,966	9.45%	1,114	0.2%	89	0.02%	3,081	0.55%	560,288	100%
Dera Ismail Khan District	73,132	28.98%	174,632	69.19%	0	0%	1,949	0.77%	159	0.06%	2,507	0.99%	252,379	100%
Bannu District	195,820	84.59%	33,656	14.54%	0	0%	1,714	0.74%	124	0.05%	171	0.07%	231,485	100%
Kohat District	169,065	77.6%	43,205	19.83%	0	0%	2,201	1.01%	171	0.08%	3,223	1.48%	217,865	100%
Total	1,088,606	53.08%	876,604	42.75%	53,021	2.59%	15,598	0.76%	4,601	0.22%	12,294	0.6%	2,050,724	100%

=== Religion ===
Religious counts below is for the entirety of NWFP (Hazara, Mardan, Peshawar, Kohat, Bannu, and Dera Ismail Khan). The Agencies and Tribal Areas constituted a separate administrative division where religious composition was not enumerated, except at small Trans-Frontier Posts in the region.

Religion in North–West Frontier Province (1855–1941)
Religious group	1855		1881		1891		1901		1911		1921		1931		1941	
Religious group	Pop.	%	Pop.	%	Pop.	%	Pop.	%	Pop.	%	Pop.	%	Pop.	%	Pop.	%
Islam	1,099,134 (Note: Includes all Abrahamic religions and others (Islam, Christianity, Zoroastrianism, Judaism, others).)	90.86%	1,787,341	91.4%	2,088,015	91.51%	1,890,479	92.19%	2,039,994	92.86%	2,062,786	91.62%	2,227,303	91.84%	2,788,797	91.8%
Hinduism	110,602 (Note: Includes all Dharmic religions (Hinduism, Sikhism, Jainism, Buddhism, others).)	9.14%	154,081	7.88%	166,984	7.32%	129,306	6.31%	119,942	5.46%	149,881	6.66%	142,977	5.9%	180,321	5.94%
Sikhism	—N/a	—N/a	9,205	0.47%	21,110	0.93%	25,733	1.25%	30,345	1.38%	28,040	1.25%	42,510	1.75%	57,939	1.91%
Christianity	—N/a	—N/a	4,725	0.24%	5,437	0.24%	5,119	0.25%	6,585	0.3%	10,610	0.47%	12,213	0.5%	10,889	0.36%
Jainism	—N/a	—N/a	106	0.01%	108	0.005%	37	0.002%	4	0.0002%	3	0.0001%	0	0%	1	0%
Zoroastrianism	—N/a	—N/a	52	0.003%	48	0.002%	46	0.002%	49	0.002%	20	0.001%	60	0.002%	24	0.001%
Buddhism	—N/a	—N/a	0	0%	0	0%	0	0%	0	0%	0	0%	2	0.0001%	25	0.001%
Judaism	—N/a	—N/a	—N/a	—N/a	4	0.0002%	4	0.0002%	14	0.001%	0	0%	11	0.0005%	71	0.002%
Others	—N/a	—N/a	5	0.0003%	2	0.0001%	0	0%	0	0%	0	0%	0	0%	0	0%
Total Population	1,209,736	100%	1,955,515	100%	2,281,708	100%	2,050,724	100%	2,196,933	100%	2,251,340	100%	2,425,076	100%	3,038,067	100%

Adherents of Islam who were indigenous to frontier regions that continued to have relatively large Hindu populations, and who were also relatively recent converts, were influenced by some traditions of Hinduism; in contrast, Muslims in frontier regions that had been further influenced by orthodox Islam and converted at a much earlier date were noted in their relatively different cultural habits.

"The high road, along which the Mohammedan conquerors and rulers of India passed and repassed lay through the north (the Khyber, Kurram and other routes); and it is probable that Islam never took so firm a hold of the inhabitants of the southern district as of the people to the north of them. In this connection it is interesting to notice that the Mussalman of the Derajat is less strict in his observance of the duties of his religion, such as fasts, prayers and the like, than his northern neighbours. Through Hazara lay the road by which the Emperors of Delhi went to and fro between the capital and their summer retreat in Kashmir, and it was natural that Islam should thoroughly permeate the district. Similarly Kohat, from its situation with regard to the Kurram Valley, which at no very distant period was, nominally at least, a portion of the Afghan kingdom, has been more influenced in the past by its Mohammedan neighbours to the west than have the districts to the south of it. There is no need to consider here the probable date at which the bulk of the Pathans living in the Province, or rather their ancestors, were converted to Islam. It is enough to notice that they had long been Mohammadan when they settled in their present homes, and that their fanaticism and intolerance, especially in the districts where they are strongest, rendered the Province no very inviting place of residence for settlers of a different creed. If no fanaticism in its inhabitants acted as a bar to the settlement of Hindus in Hazara, the absence of any large trade centres was at least equally efficacious. The only other district in which there is a non-Pathan element in the population in any way commensurate to that of Hazara is Dera Ismail Khan. The population here is mainly composed of tribes of Indian origin. Its conversion to Islam is of much later data; fanaticism does not exist, and no particular dislike to the Hindu seems to have existed."

— Excerpt from the Census of India (North-West Frontier Province), 1911 AD

Similarly, adherents of Hinduism who belonged to the various castes and tribes who were indigenous to the frontier regions had considerable Islamic influence, owing to their status as a religious minority in the region for centuries, and thus formed religious syncretism that incorporated aspects from both faiths into their cultures and traditions.

"Hinduism, as it exists in the North-West Frontier Province, is but a pale reflection of the system which flourishes in the United Provinces and other areas to the east. Even of the Derajat, where, as we have seen, the Hindu population is proportionately most numerous, the writer of the Dera Ismail Khan Gazetteer notes, "the Hindus of this district are less particular in the matter of caste prejudices and observances than down country Hindus. Most of them will drink water that has been carried in Mussaks (skins for carrying water) or out of lotas detached from a working well. They habitually ride on donkeys and do a multitude of other things which an orthodox Hindu would shrink from. All idolatrous observances are kept very much in the background. Except a few small images (thakurs) kept in their mandirs they have no idols at all. Nor is it their habit to take their gods about in procession. No one, in fact, sees anything of their worship. They burn their dead, and throw the ashes into the Indus. They always keep a few of the bones, and take them, when the opportunity offers, to the Ganges... There are a good many dharamsalas, mandirs, and dawaras at Dera Ismail Khan and in the cis-Indus tehsils."

— Excerpt from the Census of India (North-West Frontier Province), 1911 AD

Lastly, decadal census reports throughout the colonial era frequently detailed the difficulty of differentiating adherents of Hinduism with adherents of Sikhism, owing to the traditional ability of the former in assimilating and integrating followers of varied thought into Hinduism.

"The Sikh religion was born out of Hinduism, and fears have been expressed of its being reabsorbed into it. Truly wonderful is the strength and vitality of Hinduism. It is like the boa constrictor of the Indian forests; when a petty enemy appears to worry it, it winds round its opponent, crushes it in its folds, and finally causes it to disappear in its capacious interior. In this way, many centuries ago, Hinduism on its own ground disposed of Buddhism which was largely a Hindu reformation in this way in a prehistoric period it absorbed the religion of the Scythian invaders of Northern India; in this way it has converted educated Islam in India into a semi-paganism; and in this way it is disposing of the reformed and once hopeful religion of Baba Nanak. Hinduism has embraced Sikhism in its folds; the still comparatively young religion is making a vigorous struggle for life, but its ultimate destruction is, it is apprehended, inevitable without State support. Notwithstanding the Sikh Guru's powerful denunciation of Brahmans, secular Sikhs now rarely do anything without their assistance. Brahmans help them to be born, help them to wed, help them to die and help their souls after death to obtain a state of bliss. And Brahmans, with all the deftness of Roman Catholic missionaries in Protestant countries have partially succeeded in persuading the Sikhs to restore to their niches the images of Devi, the Queen of Heaven, and the Saints and gods of the ancient faith."

— Excerpt from the Census of India (North-West Frontier Province), 1911 AD)

==== Districts ====
Religion in North–West Frontier Province (1941)
1. Islam (91.8%)
2. Hinduism (5.94%)
3. Sikhism (1.91%)
4. Christianity (0.36%)
5. Others (Note: Included 71 Jews, 25 Buddhists, 24 Parsis (Zoroastrians), and 1 Jain.) (0.00%)

With rapid population growth occurring across all districts in the province, Mardan District was added to the North–West Frontier Province in 1941.

Religion in the Districts of North–West Frontier Province (1941)
District	Islam		Hinduism		Sikhism		Christianity		Others (Note: Including Jainism, Buddhism, Zoroastrianism, Judaism, Tribals, others, or not stated)		Total	
District	Pop.	%	Pop.	%	Pop.	%	Pop.	%	Pop.	%	Pop.	%
Peshawar District	769,589	90.35%	51,212	6.01%	24,030	2.82%	6,890	0.81%	112 (Note: Including 70 Jews, 24 Parsis (Zoroastrians), and 18 Buddhists)	0.01%	851,833	100%
Hazara District	756,004	94.95%	30,267	3.8%	9,220	1.16%	737	0.09%	2 (Note: Including 2 Buddhists)	0.0003%	796,230	100%
Mardan District	483,575	95.47%	10,677	2.11%	11,838	2.34%	449	0.09%	0	0%	506,539	100%
Dera Ismail Khan District	255,757	85.79%	39,167	13.14%	2,390	0.8%	810	0.27%	7 (Note: Including 5 Buddhists, 1 Jain, and 1 Jew.)	0.002%	298,131	100%
Bannu District	257,648	87.06%	31,471	10.63%	6,112	2.07%	699	0.24%	0	0%	295,930	100%
Kohat District	266,224	91.99%	17,527	6.06%	4,349	1.5%	1,304	0.45%	0	0%	289,404	100%
Total	2,788,797	91.8%	180,321	5.94%	57,939	1.91%	10,889	0.36%	121	0.004%	3,038,067	100%

Religion in the Districts of North–West Frontier Province (1931)
District	Islam		Hinduism		Sikhism		Christianity		Others		Total	
District	Pop.	%	Pop.	%	Pop.	%	Pop.	%	Pop.	%	Pop.	%
Peshawar District	898,683	92.24%	42,321	4.34%	24,271	2.49%	8,974	0.92%	72 (Note: Including 59 Parsis (Zoroastrians), 11 Jews, and 2 Buddhists)	0.01%	974,321	100%
Hazara District	636,794	95.03%	25,260	3.77%	7,630	1.14%	432	0.06%	1 (Note: Including 1 Parsi (Zoroastrian))	0.0001%	670,117	100%
Dera Ismail Khan District	235,707	86%	35,822	13.07%	1,878	0.69%	657	0.24%	0	0%	274,064	100%
Bannu District	237,674	87.93%	26,181	9.69%	5,482	2.03%	964	0.36%	0	0%	270,301	100%
Kohat District	218,445	92.45%	13,393	5.67%	3,249	1.38%	1,186	0.5%	0	0%	236,273	100%
Total	2,227,303	91.84%	142,977	5.9%	42,510	1.75%	12,213	0.5%	73 (Note: Included 60 Parsis (Zoroastrians), 11 Jews, and 2 Buddhists.)	0.003%	2,425,076	100%

Religion in the Districts of North–West Frontier Province (1921)
District	Islam		Hinduism		Sikhism		Christianity		Others		Total	
District	Pop.	%	Pop.	%	Pop.	%	Pop.	%	Pop.	%	Pop.	%
Peshawar District	836,222	92.16%	48,144	5.31%	15,326	1.69%	7,652	0.84%	23 (Note: Included 20 Parsis (Zoroastrians) and 3 Jains.)	0.003%	907,367	100%
Hazara District	591,058	94.97%	26,038	4.18%	4,850	0.78%	403	0.06%	0	0%	622,349	100%
Dera Ismail Khan District	218,315	83.72%	39,311	15.08%	1,904	0.73%	1,237	0.47%	0	0%	260,767	100%
Bannu District	219,695	89.04%	23,509	9.53%	3,286	1.33%	244	0.1%	0	0%	246,734	100%
Kohat District	197,496	92.23%	12,879	6.01%	2,674	1.25%	1,074	0.5%	0	0%	214,123	100%
Total	2,062,786	91.62%	149,881	6.66%	28,040	1.25%	10,610	0.47%	23	0.001%	2,251,340	100%

Religion in the Districts of North–West Frontier Province (1881)
District	Islam		Hinduism		Sikhism		Christianity		Others		Total	
District	Pop.	%	Pop.	%	Pop.	%	Pop.	%	Pop.	%	Pop.	%
Peshawar District	546,117	92.14%	39,321	6.63%	3,103	0.52%	4,088	0.69%	45 (Note: Included 39 Parsis (Zoroastrians), 3 Jains, and 3 Others.)	0.01%	592,674	100%
Dera Ismail Khan District	385,244	87.23%	54,446	12.33%	1,691	0.38%	253	0.06%	15 (Note: Included 13 Parsis (Zoroastrians), and 2 Jains.)	0%	441,649	100%
Hazara District	385,759	94.76%	19,843	4.87%	1,381	0.34%	90	0.02%	2	0%	407,075	100%
Bannu District	301,002	90.51%	30,643	9.21%	790	0.24%	82	0.02%	60 (Note: Included 60 Jains.)	0.02%	332,577	100%
Kohat District	169,219	93.21%	9,828	5.41%	2,240	1.23%	212	0.12%	41 (Note: Included 41 Jains.)	0.02%	181,540	100%
Total	1,787,341	91.4%	154,081	7.88%	9,205	0.47%	4,725	0.24%	163 (Note: Included 106 Jains, 52 Parsis (Zoroastrians) and 3 Others.)	0.01%	1,955,515	100%

Religion in the Districts of North–West Frontier Province (1855)
District	Abrahamic religions & Others (Islam, Christianity, Zoroastrianism, Judaism, others)		Dharmic religions (Hinduism, Sikhism, Jainism, Buddhism, others)		Total	
District	Pop.	%	Pop.	%	Pop.	%
Peshawar District	403,534	89.65%	46,565	10.35%	450,099	100%
Dera Ismail Khan District	323,071	89.24%	38,970	10.76%	362,041	100%
Hazara District	276,927	93.44%	19,437	6.56%	296,364	100%
Kohat District	95,602	94.44%	5,630	5.56%	101,232	100%
Total	1,099,134	90.86%	110,602	9.14%	1,209,736	100%

==== Tehsils ====
Religion in the Tehsils of North–West Frontier Province (1941)
Tehsil	Islam		Hinduism		Sikhism		Christianity (Note: Tehsil and city religious breakdown figures for Christianity only includes local Christians, labeled as "Indian Christians" on census. Does not include Anglo-Indian Christians or British Christians, who were classified under "Other" category.)		Others (Note: Including Anglo-Indian Christians, British Christians, Jainism, Buddhism, Zoroastrianism, Judaism, Tribals, others, or not stated)		Total	
Tehsil	Pop.	%	Pop.	%	Pop.	%	Pop.	%	Pop.	%	Pop.	%
Peshawar Tehsil	335,871	86.27%	33,551	8.62%	15,454	3.97%	2,618	0.67%	1,835	0.47%	389,329	100%
Abbottabad Tehsil	284,228	92.13%	17,558	5.69%	6,035	1.96%	278	0.09%	419	0.14%	308,518	100%
Mardan Tehsil	281,161	93.91%	8,709	2.91%	9,091	3.04%	360	0.12%	63	0.02%	299,384	100%
Charsadda Tehsil	239,634	98.11%	2,533	1.04%	1,940	0.79%	127	0.05%	12	0.005%	244,246	100%
Mansehra Tehsil	237,306	97.58%	4,910	2.02%	965	0.4%	22	0.01%	0	0%	243,203	100%
Nowshera Tehsil	194,084	88.92%	15,128	6.93%	6,636	3.04%	652	0.3%	1,758	0.81%	218,258	100%
Swabi Tehsil	202,414	97.71%	1,968	0.95%	2,747	1.33%	16	0.01%	10	0.005%	207,155	100%
Haripur Tehsil	178,545	95.04%	7,278	3.87%	2,011	1.07%	14	0.01%	6	0.003%	187,854	100%
Bannu Tehsil	157,097	83.74%	24,517	13.07%	5,285	2.82%	467	0.25%	232	0.12%	187,598	100%
Dera Ismail Khan Tehsil	155,100	82.68%	30,065	16.03%	1,740	0.93%	195	0.1%	485	0.26%	187,585	100%
Kohat Tehsil	100,868	88.01%	9,156	7.99%	3,613	3.15%	596	0.52%	383	0.33%	114,616	100%
Teri Tehsil	110,146	97.73%	2,462	2.18%	86	0.08%	0	0%	15	0.01%	112,709	100%
Marwat Tehsil	100,551	92.82%	6,954	6.42%	817	0.75%	0	0%	0	0%	108,332	100%
Hangu Tehsil	55,210	88.94%	5,909	9.52%	650	1.05%	0	0%	310	0.5%	62,079	100%
Tank Tehsil	49,847	89.55%	5,279	9.48%	401	0.72%	81	0.15%	56	0.1%	55,664	100%
Kulachi Tehsil	50,810	92.58%	3,823	6.97%	249	0.45%	0	0%	0	0%	54,882	100%
Amb Tehsil	47,288	98.69%	433	0.9%	195	0.41%	0	0%	0	0%	47,916	100%
Phulra Tehsil	8,637	98.83%	88	1.01%	14	0.16%	0	0%	0	0%	8,739	100%
Total	2,788,797	91.8%	180,321	5.94%	57,929	1.91%	5,426	0.18%	5,583	0.18%	3,038,067	100%

Religion in the Tehsils of North–West Frontier Province (1931)
Tehsil	Islam		Hinduism		Sikhism		Christianity		Others		Total	
Tehsil	Pop.	%	Pop.	%	Pop.	%	Pop.	%	Pop.	%	Pop.	%
Peshawar Tehsil	240,642	86.27%	23,538	8.44%	9,736	3.49%	4,991	1.79%	40 (Note: Including 27 Parsis (Zoroastrians), 11 Jews, and 2 Buddhists.)	0.01%	278,947	100%
Abbottabad Tehsil	235,454	92.78%	13,378	5.27%	4,599	1.81%	347	0.14%	1 (Note: Including 1 Parsi (Zoroastrian))	0%	253,779	100%
Mansehra Tehsil	203,374	97.47%	4,308	2.06%	966	0.46%	12	0.01%	0	0%	208,660	100%
Mardan Tehsil	187,180	94.27%	5,941	2.99%	5,174	2.61%	266	0.13%	0	0%	198,561	100%
Charsadda Tehsil	173,970	97.81%	2,145	1.21%	1,653	0.93%	92	0.05%	0	0%	177,860	100%
Dera Ismail Khan Tehsil	143,559	83.94%	25,982	15.19%	894	0.52%	584	0.34%	0	0%	171,019	100%
Haripur Tehsil	160,630	94.64%	7,016	4.13%	2,019	1.19%	70	0.04%	0	0%	169,735	100%
Bannu Tehsil	138,152	85.34%	17,789	10.99%	4,979	3.08%	962	0.59%	0	0%	161,882	100%
Nowshera Tehsil	142,962	89.05%	9,271	5.77%	4,678	2.91%	3,599	2.24%	32 (Note: Including 32 Parsis (Zoroastrians).)	0.02%	160,542	100%
Swabi Tehsil	153,929	97.17%	1,426	0.9%	3,030	1.91%	26	0.02%	0	0%	158,411	100%
Marwat Tehsil	99,522	91.79%	8,392	7.74%	503	0.46%	2	0%	0	0%	108,419	100%
Teri Tehsil	100,179	97.25%	2,788	2.71%	27	0.03%	17	0.02%	0	0%	103,011	100%
Kohat Tehsil	77,408	87.65%	7,615	8.62%	2,184	2.47%	1,103	1.25%	0	0%	88,310	100%
Kulachi Tehsil	46,709	90.08%	4,731	9.12%	410	0.79%	1	0%	0	0%	51,851	100%
Tank Tehsil	45,439	88.76%	5,109	9.98%	574	1.12%	72	0.14%	0	0%	51,194	100%
Hangu Tehsil	40,858	90.89%	2,990	6.65%	1,038	2.31%	66	0.15%	0	0%	44,952	100%
Amb Tehsil	30,742	98.22%	509	1.63%	45	0.14%	3	0.01%	0	0%	31,299	100%
Phulra Tehsil	6,594	99.25%	49	0.74%	1	0.02%	0	0%	0	0%	6,644	100%
Total	2,227,303	91.84%	142,977	5.9%	42,510	1.75%	12,213	0.5%	73	0%	2,425,076	100%

Religion in the Tehsils of North–West Frontier Province (1921)
Tehsil	Islam		Hinduism		Sikhism		Christianity		Others		Total	
Tehsil	Pop.	%	Pop.	%	Pop.	%	Pop.	%	Pop.	%	Pop.	%
Peshawar Tehsil	225,897	85.82%	25,414	9.65%	8,223	3.12%	3,671	1.39%	23	0.01%	263,228	100%
Abbottabad Tehsil	214,720	92.54%	13,580	5.85%	3,344	1.44%	390	0.17%	0	0%	232,034	100%
Mansehra Tehsil	195,812	97.48%	4,592	2.29%	468	0.23%	7	0.003%	0	0%	200,879	100%
Mardan Tehsil	161,726	94.22%	6,846	3.99%	2,874	1.67%	196	0.11%	0	0%	171,642	100%
Charsadda Tehsil	161,406	98.16%	2,183	1.33%	787	0.48%	62	0.04%	0	0%	164,438	100%
Haripur Tehsil	153,645	94.85%	7,362	4.54%	968	0.6%	6	0.004%	0	0%	161,981	100%
Swabi Tehsil	155,116	97.41%	3,063	1.92%	1,062	0.67%	1	0.001%	0	0%	159,242	100%
Dera Ismail Khan Tehsil	129,919	83.27%	24,685	15.82%	884	0.57%	529	0.34%	0	0%	156,017	100%
Nowshera Tehsil	132,077	88.75%	10,638	7.15%	2,380	1.6%	3,722	2.5%	0	0%	148,817	100%
Bannu Tehsil	123,384	86.56%	16,130	11.32%	2,777	1.95%	244	0.17%	0	0%	142,535	100%
Marwat Tehsil	96,311	92.43%	7,379	7.08%	509	0.49%	0	0%	0	0%	104,199	100%
Teri Tehsil	89,924	97.49%	2,239	2.43%	45	0.05%	29	0.03%	0	0%	92,237	100%
Kohat Tehsil	67,535	87.51%	6,415	8.31%	2,195	2.84%	1,026	1.33%	0	0%	77,171	100%
Tank Tehsil	47,895	80.31%	10,224	17.14%	811	1.36%	707	1.19%	0	0%	59,637	100%
Kulachi Tehsil	40,501	89.78%	4,402	9.76%	209	0.46%	1	0.002%	0	0%	45,113	100%
Hangu Tehsil	40,037	89.54%	4,225	9.45%	434	0.97%	19	0.04%	0	0%	44,715	100%
Amb Tehsil	21,244	97.66%	440	2.02%	70	0.32%	0	0%	0	0%	21,754	100%
Phulra Tehsil	5,637	98.88%	64	1.12%	0	0%	0	0%	0	0%	5,701	100%
Total	2,062,786	91.62%	149,881	6.66%	28,040	1.25%	10,610	0.47%	23	0%	2,251,340	100%

==== Cities ====
Religion in Urban North–West Frontier Province (1941)
1. Islam (66.3%)
2. Hinduism (24.3%)
3. Sikhism (7.50%)
4. Others (1.90%)

Religion in the Cities of North–West Frontier Province (1941)
City/Urban Area	Islam		Hinduism		Sikhism		Christianity		Others		Total	
City/Urban Area	Pop.	%	Pop.	%	Pop.	%	Pop.	%	Pop.	%	Pop.	%
Peshawar (Note: Includes total Municipality and Cantonment population.)	122,972	70.91%	31,630	18.24%	14,245	8.21%	2,586	1.49%	1,987	1.15%	173,420	100%
Dera Ismail Khan	26,424	51.5%	22,815	44.47%	1,412	2.75%	195	0.38%	460	0.9%	51,306	100%
Kohat	32,111	71.39%	8,250	18.34%	3,562	7.92%	445	0.99%	609	1.35%	44,977	100%
Nowshera (Note: Includes total Cantonment and Notified area population.)	28,132	63.9%	9,831	22.33%	4,253	9.66%	412	0.94%	1,394	3.17%	44,022	100%
Mardan	30,301	71.31%	5,851	13.77%	6,014	14.15%	282	0.66%	46	0.11%	42,494	100%
Bannu	10,696	27.78%	22,175	57.59%	4,894	12.71%	467	1.21%	232	0.6%	38,504	100%
Abbottabad	12,192	44.46%	11,886	43.34%	2,680	9.77%	298	1.09%	368	1.34%	27,424	100%
Charsadda	15,747	93.48%	745	4.42%	294	1.75%	54	0.32%	5	0.03%	16,845	100%
Parang	13,494	99.99%	2	0.01%	0	0%	0	0%	0	0%	13,496	100%
Tangi	12,456	96.51%	444	3.44%	2	0.02%	4	0.03%	0	0%	12,906	100%
Mansehra	8,141	79.68%	1,699	16.63%	375	3.67%	2	0.02%	0	0%	10,217	100%
Lakki (Note: Includes total Notified area population.)	5,883	58.01%	3,710	36.58%	548	5.4%	0	0%	0	0%	10,141	100%
Utmanzai	9,768	96.44%	182	1.8%	171	1.69%	8	0.08%	0	0%	10,129	100%
Haripur	5,174	55.5%	3,113	33.39%	1,035	11.1%	0	0%	0	0%	9,322	100%
Tank	5,531	60.85%	3,296	36.26%	181	1.99%	66	0.73%	15	0.17%	9,089	100%
Risalpur	3,506	38.93%	3,937	43.71%	1,024	11.37%	333	3.7%	207	2.3%	9,007	100%
Kulachi	6,610	74.77%	2,092	23.67%	138	1.56%	0	0%	0	0%	8,840	100%
Baffa	7,166	89.71%	735	9.2%	81	1.01%	6	0.08%	0	0%	7,988	100%
Nawan Shehr	5,075	79.12%	1,030	16.06%	309	4.82%	0	0%	0	0%	6,414	100%
Kot Najibullah	4,228	79.55%	929	17.48%	156	2.94%	2	0.04%	0	0%	5,315	100%
Cherat	270	80.12%	30	8.9%	25	7.42%	0	0%	12	3.56%	337	100%
Total Urban population	365,877	66.26%	134,382	24.34%	41,399	7.5%	5,160	0.93%	5,335	0.97%	552,193	100%

Religion in Urban North–West Frontier Province (1931)
1. Islam (66.3%)
2. Hinduism (24.1%)
3. Sikhism (6.57%)
4. Christianity (2.95%)
5. Others (0.02%)

Religion in the Cities of North–West Frontier Province (1931)
City/Urban Area	Islam		Hinduism		Sikhism		Christianity		Others		Total	
City/Urban Area	Pop.	%	Pop.	%	Pop.	%	Pop.	%	Pop.	%	Pop.	%
Peshawar	86,369	70.87%	21,973	18.03%	8,630	7.08%	4,854	3.98%	40	0.03%	121,866	100%
Dera Ismail Khan	22,321	55.34%	16,761	41.56%	708	1.76%	541	1.34%	0	0%	40,331	100%
Kohat	24,388	71%	6,709	19.53%	2,152	6.26%	1,101	3.21%	0	0%	34,350	100%
Bannu	10,607	34.73%	15,036	49.24%	3,947	12.92%	949	3.11%	0	0%	30,539	100%
Nowshera	19,662	67.88%	4,675	16.14%	3,042	10.5%	1,560	5.39%	27 (Note: Including 27 Parsis (Zoroastrians))	0.09%	28,966	100%
Mardan	19,579	74.5%	3,605	13.72%	2,927	11.14%	168	0.64%	0	0%	26,279	100%
Abbottabad	7,026	43.46%	7,753	47.96%	1,039	6.43%	346	2.14%	1	0.01%	16,165	100%
Charsadda	10,703	92.77%	519	4.5%	287	2.49%	28	0.24%	0	0%	11,537	100%
Parang	10,211	99.84%	16	0.16%	0	0%	0	0%	0	0%	10,227	100%
Tangi	8,320	95.75%	362	4.17%	7	0.08%	0	0%	0	0%	8,689	100%
Kulachi	6,115	72.58%	2,182	25.9%	128	1.52%	0	0%	0	0%	8,425	100%
Risalpur	3,170	39.55%	2,900	36.18%	314	3.92%	1,629	20.32%	3 (Note: Including 3 Parsis (Zoroastrians).)	0.04%	8,016	100%
Lakki	4,630	60.11%	2,805	36.41%	268	3.48%	0	0%	0	0%	7,703	100%
Haripur	4,253	55.57%	2,693	35.19%	696	9.09%	11	0.14%	0	0%	7,653	100%
Baffa	6,409	88.31%	762	10.5%	86	1.19%	0	0%	0	0%	7,257	100%
Tank	3,929	61.19%	2,244	34.95%	240	3.74%	8	0.12%	0	0%	6,421	100%
Mansehra	4,217	72.96%	1,091	18.88%	469	8.11%	3	0.05%	0	0%	5,780	100%
Nawan Shehr	3,884	75.71%	883	17.21%	363	7.08%	0	0%	0	0%	5,130	100%
Cherat	396	46.98%	158	18.74%	74	8.78%	213	25.27%	2 (Note: Including 2 Parsis (Zoroastrians).)	0.24%	843	100%
Total Urban population	256,189	66.34%	93,127	24.12%	25,377	6.57%	11,411	2.95%	73	0.02%	386,177	100%

Religion in Urban North–West Frontier Province (1921)
1. Islam (63.3%)
2. Hinduism (28.2%)
3. Sikhism (5.58%)
4. Christianity (2.95%)
5. Others (0.01%)

Religion in the Cities of North–West Frontier Province (1921)
City/Urban Area	Islam		Hinduism		Sikhism		Christianity		Others		Total	
City/Urban Area	Pop.	%	Pop.	%	Pop.	%	Pop.	%	Pop.	%	Pop.	%
Peshawar	73,882	70.73%	20,981	20.09%	6,152	5.89%	3,414	3.27%	23	0.02%	104,452	100%
Dera Ismail Khan	21,056	53.52%	17,077	43.41%	724	1.84%	484	1.23%	0	0%	39,341	100%
Kohat	18,898	67.85%	5,796	20.81%	2,139	7.68%	1,020	3.66%	0	0%	27,853	100%
Nowshera	18,335	66.09%	6,192	22.32%	1,319	4.75%	1,896	6.83%	0	0%	27,742	100%
Bannu	6,376	28.64%	13,222	59.4%	2,421	10.88%	242	1.09%	0	0%	22,261	100%
Abbottabad	5,007	36.76%	7,346	53.94%	879	6.45%	388	2.85%	0	0%	13,620	100%
Mardan	5,890	53.89%	3,220	29.46%	1,679	15.36%	141	1.29%	0	0%	10,930	100%
Tank	6,043	55.72%	4,197	38.7%	344	3.17%	262	2.42%	0	0%	10,846	100%
Charsadda	9,710	94.9%	484	4.73%	30	0.29%	8	0.08%	0	0%	10,232	100%
Parang	9,869	99.83%	16	0.16%	1	0.01%	0	0%	0	0%	9,886	100%
Tangi	9,528	96.8%	314	3.19%	1	0.01%	0	0%	0	0%	9,843	100%
Risalpur	2,721	32.02%	3,369	39.64%	601	7.07%	1,808	21.27%	0	0%	8,499	100%
Kulachi	5,649	71.55%	2,162	27.38%	84	1.06%	0	0%	0	0%	7,895	100%
Baffa	6,703	88.16%	861	11.32%	39	0.51%	0	0%	0	0%	7,603	100%
Lakki	4,463	59.7%	2,543	34.02%	470	6.29%	0	0%	0	0%	7,476	100%
Jamrud	1,507	24.59%	3,114	50.82%	1,254	20.46%	253	4.13%	0	0%	6,128	100%
Haripur	2,907	49.36%	2,636	44.76%	346	5.88%	0	0%	0	0%	5,889	100%
Nawan Shehr	3,794	74.51%	1,052	20.66%	246	4.83%	0	0%	0	0%	5,092	100%
Cherat	173	66.28%	80	30.65%	8	3.07%	0	0%	0	0%	261	100%
Total Urban population	212,511	63.28%	94,662	28.19%	18,737	5.58%	9,916	2.95%	23	0.01%	335,849	100%

=== Castes and tribes ===
Castes and Tribes of North-West Frontier Province (1931–1941)
Caste or Tribe	1931		1941 (Note: During the 1941 census, many traditional census datasets including caste/tribe enumeration were not extensive due to World War II.)	
Caste or Tribe	Pop.	%	Pop.	%
Pathan	905,122	37.32%	795,400	26.18%
Awan	280,995	11.59%	178,896	5.89%
Gujar	121,170	5%	114,746	3.78%
Tanoli	86,003	3.55%	113,850	3.75%
Sayyid	81,972	3.38%	71,271	2.35%
Jat	73,919	3.05%	43,041	1.42%
Arora	60,283	2.49%	17,817	0.59%
Swathi	46,556	1.92%	37,245	1.23%
Tarkhan	45,088	1.86%	—N/a	—N/a
Julaha	40,055	1.65%	—N/a	—N/a
Dhund	39,322	1.62%	—N/a	—N/a
Baluch	37,145	1.53%	—N/a	—N/a
Khatri	33,804	1.39%	13,946	0.46%
Lohar	28,968	1.19%	—N/a	—N/a
Baghban	28,422	1.17%	—N/a	—N/a
Qureshi	27,211	1.12%	—N/a	—N/a
Karlal	27,185	1.12%	—N/a	—N/a
Mochi	26,628	1.1%	—N/a	—N/a
Kumhar	23,109	0.95%	—N/a	—N/a
Kashmiri	21,704	0.89%	—N/a	—N/a
Nai	17,178	0.71%	—N/a	—N/a
Brahman	16,379	0.68%	13,478	0.44%
Mughal	16,047	0.66%	—N/a	—N/a
Rajput	14,681	0.61%	—N/a	—N/a
Sheikh	13,046	0.54%	—N/a	—N/a
Dhobi	11,699	0.48%	—N/a	—N/a
Qassab	11,534	0.48%	—N/a	—N/a
Mirasi	10,869	0.45%	—N/a	—N/a
Sarara	9,984	0.41%	—N/a	—N/a
Sonar	9,532	0.39%	—N/a	—N/a
Chuhra	8,444	0.35%	3,838	0.13%
Paracha & Banjara	8,259	0.34%	—N/a	—N/a
Teli	7,174	0.3%	—N/a	—N/a
Gakhar	7,098	0.29%	—N/a	—N/a
Maliar	6,622	0.27%	—N/a	—N/a
Mallah	6,578	0.27%	—N/a	—N/a
Bhatia	6,522	0.27%	—N/a	—N/a
Arain	6,480	0.27%	—N/a	—N/a
Mashwani	6,084	0.25%	—N/a	—N/a
Rangrez	5,703	0.24%	—N/a	—N/a
Turk	5,277	0.22%	—N/a	—N/a
Bhatiara	4,998	0.21%	—N/a	—N/a
Khoja	4,986	0.21%	—N/a	—N/a
Gurkha	4,565	0.19%	—N/a	—N/a
Machhi	4,130	0.17%	—N/a	—N/a
Chamar	2,901	0.12%	12,990	0.43%
Penjara	2,573	0.11%	—N/a	—N/a
Darzi	2,177	0.09%	—N/a	—N/a
Jhinwar	1,108	0.05%	—N/a	—N/a
Others or Not Stated	157,787	6.51%	1,621,549	53.37%
Total	2,425,076	100%	3,038,067	100%

== See also ==
- Frontier Regions
- Federally Administered Tribal Areas
- Eighteenth Amendment to the Constitution of Pakistan

== Bibliography ==
- The Imperial Gazetteer of India (26 vol, 1908–31), a highly detailed description of all of India in 1901. online edition
