= Banda Daudshah Tehsil =

Banda Daudshah
- Tehsil
- Country: Pakistan
- Province: Khyber Pakhtunkhwa
- District: Kohat
- Time zone: UTC+5 (PST)

Banda Daudshah Tehsil (Pashto: بانډه داود شاه) or Banda Daud Shah, colloquially known as Bonda, is an administrative subdivision (tehsil) of Kohat District in the Khyber Pakhtunkhwa province of Pakistan. It is dominated by the Khattak tribe of the Pashtun people, and includes the historical Pashtun town of Teri.
