= Tank Tehsil =

Tank Tehsil تحصیل ٹانک ټانک تحصیل
- Tehsil
- Location in Khyber Pakhtunkhwa Tank Tehsil (Pakistan)
- Coordinates: 32°13′N 70°23′E
- Country: Pakistan
- Region: Khyber Pakhtunkhwa
- District: Tank District

Area
  - Tehsil: 1,679 km^{2} (648 sq mi)

Population (2023)
  - Tehsil: 425,499
  - Density: 253.4/km^{2} (656.4/sq mi)
  - Urban: 49,172 (11.56%)
  - Rural: 376,327 (88.44%)

Literacy (2023)
  - Literacy rate: 41.43%
- Time zone: UTC+5 (PST)
  - Summer (DST): UTC+6 (PDT)

Tank (Urdu: تحصِيل ټک) is a tehsil located in Tank District, Khyber Pakhtunkhwa, Pakistan.

== Geography ==
Tank Tehsil has an area of 1,679 km^{2}.

=== Adjacent tehsils ===
- Frontier Region Tank, Federally Administered Tribal Areas (north)
- Lakki Marwat Tehsil, Lakki Marwat District (northeast)
- Kulachi Tehsil, Dera Ismail Khan District (south)
- Wana Tehsil, South Waziristan Agency, Federally Administered Tribal Areas (southwest)
- Sararogha Tehsil, South Waziristan Agency, Federally Administered Tribal Areas (northwest)

== Demographics ==
=== Population ===
Historical population
Year	Pop.	±% p.a.
1951	53,076	—
1961	80,359	+4.24%
1972	93,389	+1.38%
1981	141,062	+4.69%
1998	238,216	+3.13%
2017	391,885	+2.65%
2023	425,499	+1.38%

Tank Tehsil has a population of 391,885 and has 43,071 households according to the 2017 census. The population recorded in the 1998 census was 238,216. According to 2023 census, the population was 425,499.

== See also ==
- Tehsils of Pakistan
  - List of tehsils of Khyber Pakhtunkhwa
