= Hazara District =

District of Peshawar Division, Pakistan

Map of Hazara district of the North-West Frontier Province, British India, 1916

Hazara District was a district of Peshawar Division in the North-West Frontier Province of Pakistan. It existed until 1976, when it was split into the districts of Abbottabad and Mansehra, with the new district of Haripur subsequently splitting off from Abbottabad, and Battagram and Torghar – from Mansehra.

== History ==
Hazara district was annexed by the British from its former Sikh rulers after the Second Anglo-Sikh War of 1848–1849. In 1853 the district came under the charge of General John Becher for six years - his biographer described the district as “the wildest” in the Punjab.

In the 1871 census of India the population of Hazara District (Huzara) was recorded as 367,218. In the 1901 census of India the total population was recorded as 560,288 and in the 1911 census of India, the total population was recorded as 603,028 fifty years later in the 1961 census of Pakistan, the total population was recorded as 1,050,374 of which 535,078 were male and 515,296.

=== Current status ===
The Hazara District is now divided into Abbottabad, Mansehra and Haripur districts.

== Geography ==
The Imperial Gazetteer of India described the district as follows:

Northernmost District of the North - West Frontier Province, and the only portion of that Province east of the Indus. It lies between 33° 44′ and 35° 10′ N. and 72° 33′ and 74° 6′ E., with an area Of 2,858, or, including Tanāwal, 3,062 square miles. The District consists of a long tongue of British territory running north and south for 120 miles. The southern base is 56 miles in width, and the centre 40, while the Kāgān valley, in the north east, is only about 15 miles broad. On the north the Kāgān range separates the District from Chilās, a dependency of Kashmir; and on the east the range which borders the left bank of the Kunhār river and the Jhelum separates it from Kashmir, Punch, and the Punjab, District of Rawalpindi; north-west lie the Black Mountain and the lofty ranges which overhang the eastern bank of the Indus; and on the south is Attock District of the Punjab. Thus the District lies like a wedge of British territory driven in between Kashmir on the east and the independent hills on the west. Hazara presents every gradation of scenery, altitude, and climate. The valley of the Harroh, only 1,500 feet above sea-level, merges into the Hazara plain, an area of 200 square miles, with a mean elevation of 2,500 feet. Higher again is the Orāsh plain, where Abbottābād lies between 4,000 and 5,000 feet above the sea. Lastly the Kāgān valley, comprising one-third of the total area, is a sparsely populated mountain glen, shut in by parallel ranges of hills which rise to 17,000 feet above the sea. Never more than 15 miles apart, these ranges throw out spurs across the valley, leaving only a narrow central gorge through which the Kunhar river forces an outlet to the Jhelum.

== Demographics ==
Religious groups in Hazara District (North-West Frontier Province) during the British Raj
Religious group	1881		1891		1901		1911		1921		1931		1941	
Religious group	Pop.	%	Pop.	%	Pop.	%	Pop.	%	Pop.	%	Pop.	%	Pop.	%
Islam	385,759	94.76%	488,453	94.61%	533,120	95.15%	572,972	95.02%	591,058	94.97%	636,794	95.03%	756,004	94.95%
Hinduism	19,843	4.87%	23,983	4.65%	23,031	4.11%	24,389	4.04%	26,038	4.18%	25,260	3.77%	30,267	3.8%
Sikhism	1,381	0.34%	3,609	0.7%	4,036	0.72%	5,489	0.91%	4,850	0.78%	7,630	1.14%	9,220	1.16%
Christianity	90	0.02%	236	0.05%	101	0.02%	178	0.03%	403	0.06%	432	0.06%	737	0.09%
Jainism	0	0%	3	0%	0	0%	0	0%	0	0%	0	0%	0	0%
Zoroastrianism	0	0%	4	0%	0	0%	0	0%	0	0%	1	0%	0	0%
Buddhism	0	0%	0	0%	0	0%	0	0%	0	0%	0	0%	2	0%
Judaism	—N/a	—N/a	0	0%	0	0%	0	0%	0	0%	0	0%	0	0%
Others	2	0%	0	0%	0	0%	0	0%	0	0%	0	0%	0	0%
Total population	407,075	100%	516,288	100%	560,288	100%	603,028	100%	622,349	100%	670,117	100%	796,230	100%
Note: The district borders are not an exact match in the present-day due to various bifurcations to district borders — which since created new districts — throughout the region during the post-independence era that have taken into account population increases.
