= Haripur Tehsil =

Haripur Tehsil تحصیل ہری پور هريپور تحصیل
- Tehsil
- Country: Pakistan
- Province: Khyber Pakhtunkhwa
- District: Haripur District

Government
  - Chairman: Samiullah Khan (IND)

Area
  - Tehsil: 834 km^{2} (322 sq mi)

Population (2017)
  - Tehsil: 857,664
  - Urban: 133,024
  - Rural: 724,640
- Time zone: UTC+5 (PST)
- Number of towns: 1
- Number of Union Councils: 8

Haripur Tehsil is a tehsil located in Haripur District, Khyber Pakhtunkhwa, Pakistan. The tehsil is administratively subdivided into 37 Union Councils. It covers an area of 834 km^{2} (322 sq mi).

== History ==
Today's Haripur Tehsil is a subdivision of Haripur District, prior to 1991 the whole of Haripur District was a subdivision of Abbottabad District - then known as Haripur Tehsil.

== Demography ==
According to the 2023 census the total population of Haripur Tehsil was 688,293 of which 348,868 were male and 339,415 were female. The census also recorded religious affiliation as follows: 832914 Muslim, 1867 Christians, 18 Hindus, 103 Ahmadi Muslims, 13 Sikh and 53 listed as others.

Religious affiliation of residents
Religion	Followers	Percentage
Muslim	832,914	99.76%
Christian	1,867	0.22%
Hindu	18	<0.01%
Ahmadis	103	0.01%
Sikh	13	<0.01%
Others	53	0.01%

The mother tongue of residents was recorded as follows: 19,313 Urdu, 7,019 Punjabi, 421 Sindhi, 107,464 Pushto, 166 Balochi, 452 Kashmiri, 939 Saraiki, 689,832 Hindko, 229 Brahvi, 363 Shina, 30 Balti, 5 Mewati, 11 Kalasha, 2,630 Kohistani and 6,100 listed as others.

Mother tongue of residents
Language	Speakers	Percentage
Urdu	19,313	2.52%
Punjabi	7,019	0.92%
Sindhi	421	0.05%
Pushto	107,464	14.04%
Balochi	166	0.02%
Kashmiri	452	0.06%
Saraiki	939	0.12%
Hindko	689,832	90.18%
Brahvi	229	0.03%
Shina	363	0.05%
Balti	30	0.00%
Mewati	5	0.00%
Kalasha	11	0.00%
Kohistani	2,630	0.34%
Others	6,100	0.80%
