= Bannu Tehsil =

Subdivision of Khyber Pakhtunkhwa, Pakistan

Bannu Tehsil تحصیل بنوں بنو تحصیل
- Tehsil
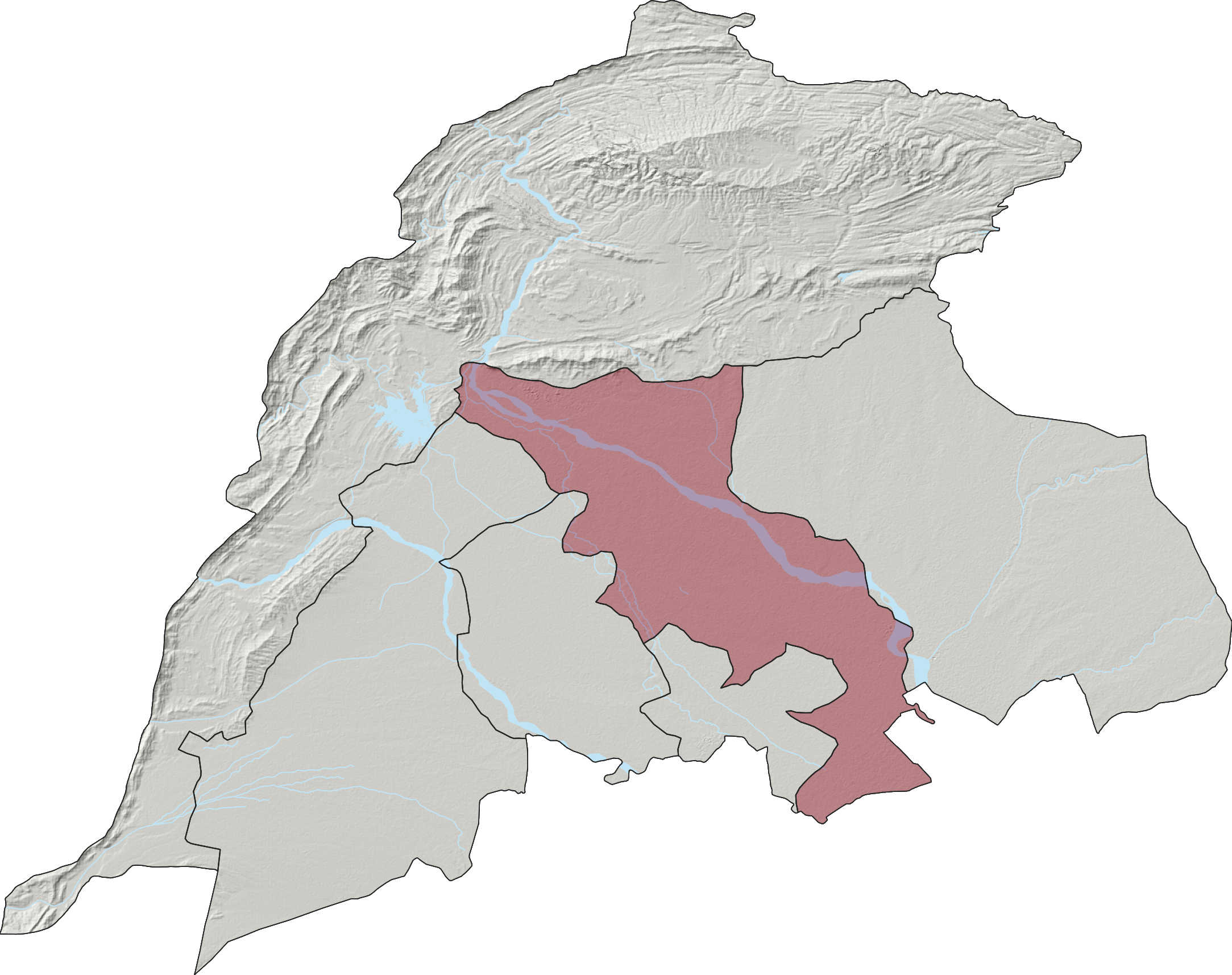
- Bannu Tehsil (red) in Bannu District
- Country: Pakistan
- Region: Khyber Pakhtunkhwa
- District: Bannu District

Government
  - Chairman: Irfan Ullah Khan Durrani (JUI(F))

Population (2017)
  - Tehsil: 958,504
  - Urban: 49,965
  - Rural: 908,539
- Time zone: UTC+5 (PST)
  - Summer (DST): UTC+6 (PDT)

Bannu Tehsil is an administrative subdivision (tehsil) of Bannu District, Bannu Division, Khyber Pakhtunkhwa Province, Pakistan. The population is 958,504 according to the 2017 census.

== See also ==
- List of tehsils of Khyber Pakhtunkhwa
