= Prang, Khyber Pakhtunkhwa =

Prang
- Location within Pakistan
- Coordinates: 34.8°N 71.44°E
- Country: Pakistan
- Province: Khyber Pakhtunkhwa
- Elevation: 276 m (906 ft)
- Time zone: UTC+5 (PST)

Prang is a town of Charsadda District in the Khyber Pakhtunkhwa province of Pakistan. It is at 34°8'20N 71°44'11E with an altitude of 276 metres (908 feet) and is above the junction of the Swat and Kabul rivers, 16 miles north-east of Peshawar. It is practically the southern portion of the town of Charsadda. A north–south road cuts across Charsadda's cemetery to connect the two towns. The main highway runs about a mile west of the town.

Prang is located on top of part of a large archaeological mound known as Majuki Dherai. A river evidently cut through the mound at one point, leaving behind sand deposits. The northern part of the mound is mostly intact because it's covered up by the Charsadda cemetery, but the southern part has been affected by people removing some of its soil to serve as manure for farmland.

== Name ==
According to Ahmad Hasan Dani, the name Prang is ultimately derived from the word Prayag, meaning "confluence", via an intermediate contracted form *Prag. The name is a reference to the Kabul and Swat rivers, which must have once met here.

== History ==
According to Ahmad Hasan Dani, Prang must have been continuously occupied since ancient times. The name indicates that it must have once held religious significance, but what kind is now unknown. Archaeological finds here indicate that there was a prosperous city from Indo-Greek through Hindu Shahi times, and the uppermost layers also include glazed potsherds from the Early Islamic period. Over 300 different potsherds with stamped designs have been found, including some in the shape of a tamgha.

The population of Prang in 1901 was 10,235, consisting chiefly of Muhammadzai Pathans.
