= Hangu Tehsil =

Hangu Tehsil تحصیل ہنگو هنګو تحصیل
- Tehsil
- Interactive map of Hangu Tehsil
- Country: Pakistan
- Region: Khyber Pakhtunkhwa
- District: Hangu

Population (2017)
  - Tehsil: 270,295
  - Urban: 48,764
  - Rural: 221,531
- Time zone: UTC+5 (PST)
  - Summer (DST): UTC+6 (PDT)

Hangu is a tehsil of Hangu District in the Khyber Pakhtunkhwa province of Pakistan. The population is 270,295 according to the 2017 census.

== See also ==
- List of tehsils of Khyber Pakhtunkhwa
