= Lakki Marwat Tehsil =

Lakki Marwat Tehsil تحصیل لکۍ مروت
- Tehsil
- Country: Pakistan
- Region: Khyber Pakhtunkhwa
- District: Lakki Marwat District

Government
  - Chairman: Shafkat Ullah Khan (IND)

Population (2017)
  - Tehsil: 579,274
  - Urban: 59,465
  - Rural: 519,809
- Time zone: UTC+5 (PST)
  - Summer (DST): UTC+6 (PDT)

Lakki Marwat is a tehsil located in Lakki Marwat District, Khyber Pakhtunkhwa, Pakistan. The population is 579,274 according to the 2017 census.

== See also ==
- List of tehsils of Khyber Pakhtunkhwa
