= Teri, Khyber Pakhtunkhwa =

Pakistani village

Coordinates: 33°18′0″N 71°6′0″E

Teri, formerly a Tehsil, is a village and Union Council in Karak District of Khyber Pakhtunkhwa, Pakistan. It is located at 33°18'0"N 71°6'0"E with an altitude of 634 metres (2,083 feet).

There is a temple of Advaitanand Ji in Teri, which was renovated in 2021.
