= Kulachi Tehsil =

Kulachi Tehsil تحصیل کلاچی کلاچي تحصیل
- Tehsil
- Interactive map of Kulachi Tehsil
- Country: Pakistan
- Province: Khyber Pakhtunkhwa
- District: Dera Ismail Khan

Government
  - Chairman: Aariz Khan Gandapur (PTI)

Population (2017)
  - Tehsil: 101,854
  - Urban: 24,738
  - Rural: 77,116
- Time zone: UTC+5 (PST)
- Number of towns: 2
- Number of Union Councils: 15

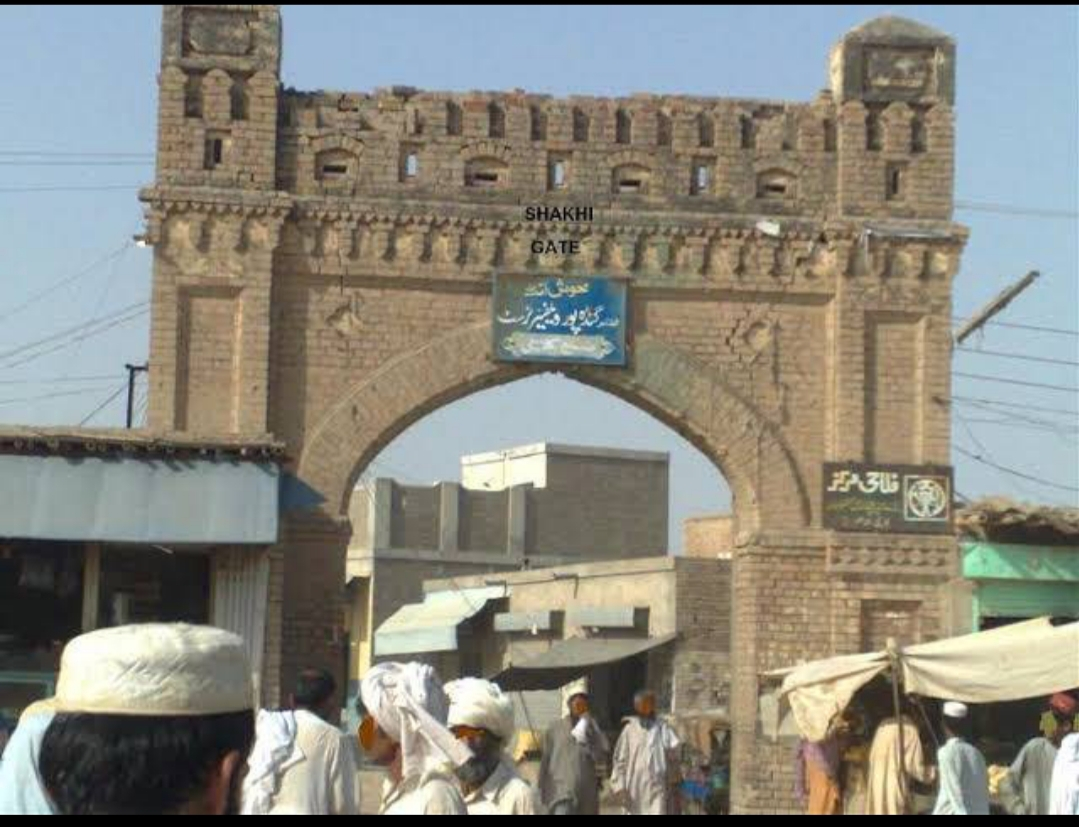
Head quarter of Kulachi tehsil is surrounded by six historical gates.

Kulachi Tehsil is a tehsil located in Dera Ismail Khan District, Khyber Pakhtunkhwa, Pakistan.

As per the 2023 Census of Pakistan, the tehsil's population is 102,595.

== Administration ==
The tehsil is administratively subdivided into 15 Union Councils, one of which forms the headquarters - Kulachi.

== History ==
During British rule Kulachi was a tehsil of the old Dera Ismail Khan District. It was described as follows in the Imperial Gazetteer of India:

Kulāchi Tahsīl.- Western tahsīl of Dera Ismail Khān District, Khyber-Pakhtunkhwa, consisting of the country immediately below the Sulaiman mountains, between 30’ 15" and 32’ 17" N. and 70’ 11" and 70’ 42" E., with an area of 1,509 square miles (3,910 km^{2}). In appearance the tract bears a generic resemblance to the Dera Ismail Khan tahsil, except for the stony plain and the line of barren and unsightly hills which form its western border. The plain is much cleft by deep channels which carry off the rainwater from the hills, and these are utilized for irrigation with great skill. The population in 1901 was 55,053, compared with 52,270 in 1891. The headquarters are at Kulachi (population, 9,125), and the tehsil also contains 81 villages. The land revenue and cesses in 1903-4 amounted to Rs. 96,000.
