= Dera Ismail Khan Division =

Administrative division of Khyber Pakhtunkhwa, Pakistan

Coordinates: 31°33′N 70°10′E

Dera Ismail Khan Division ڈیرہ اسماعیل خان ڈویژن ډېره اسماعيل خان څانګه
- Division
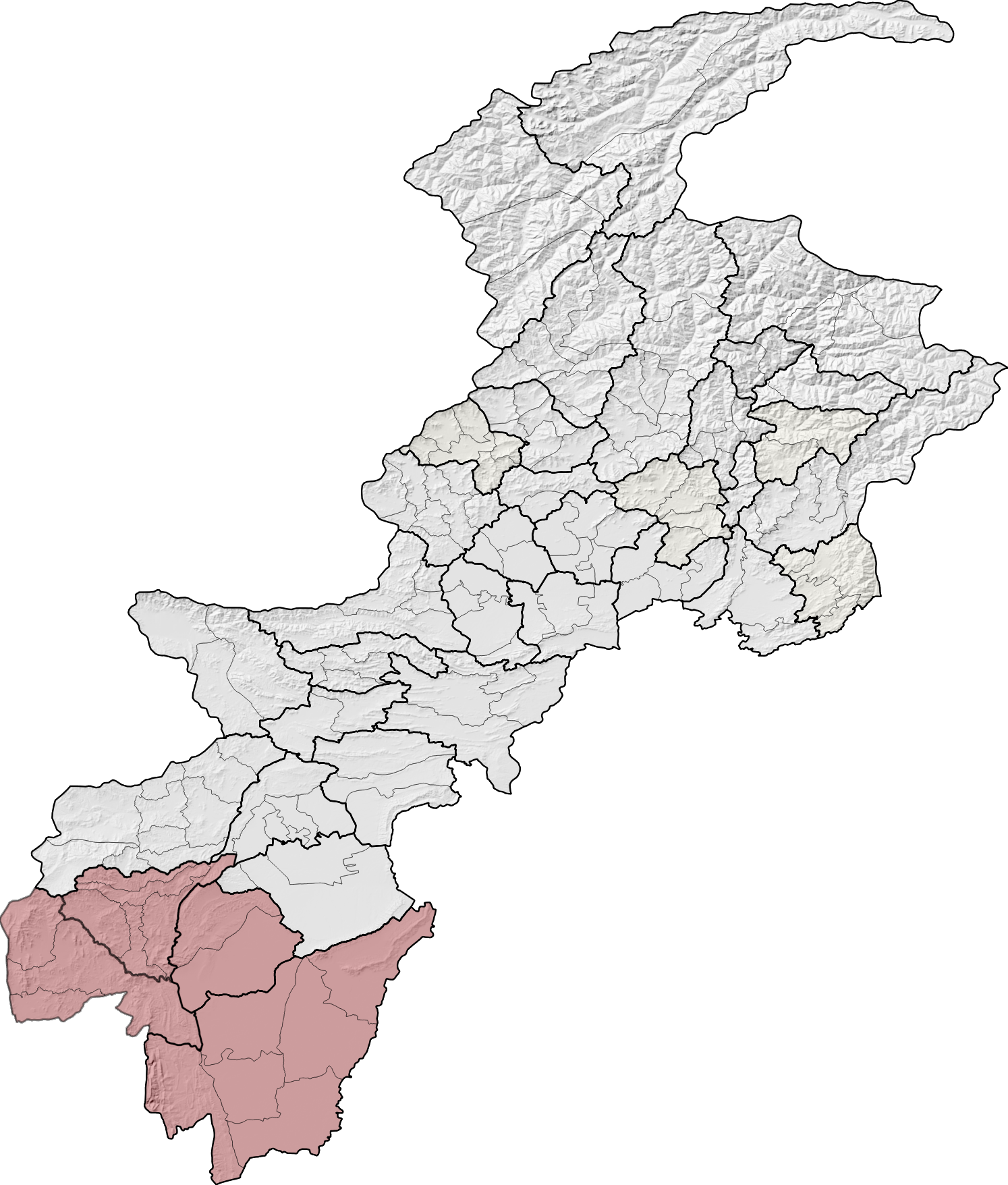
- Dera Ismail Khan Division (red) in Khyber Pakhtunkhwa
- Country: Pakistan
- Province: Khyber Pakhtunkhwa
- Capital: Dera Ismail Khan

Government
  - Type: Divisional Administration
  - Commissioner: Amir Latif (PAS)
  - Regional Police Officer: Nasir Memood Satti (PSP)

Area
  - Division: 18,854 km^{2} (7,280 sq mi)

Population (2023)
  - Division: 3,188,779
  - Density: 169.13/km^{2} (438.0/sq mi)
  - Urban: 423,929 (13.29%)
  - Rural: 2,764,850

Ethnicities
  - People: Largest: Pashtun (58%); Others: Siraikis (40.09%)

Literacy
  - Literacy rate: Total: (41.73%); Male: (53.74%); Female: (28.52 %)
- Website: cdk.kp.gov.pk

Dera Ismail Khan Division is an administrative division of Khyber Pakhtunkhwa Province, Pakistan. It is the southernmost division of Khyber Pakhtunkhwa. CNIC code of Dera Ismail Khan Division is 12.

== Location ==
Dera Ismail Khan Division borders Bannu Division (also Khyber Pakhtunkhwa) in the north, Dera Ghazi Khan Division and Sargodha Division (both Punjab) in the south-east and east respectively, Zhob Division (Balochistan) province in the south, and Afghanistan in the west.

== History ==
It was formed after the implementation of the One Unit Scheme in 1954, according to which the North-West Frontier Province was divided into Dera Ismail Khan and Peshawar Divisions reforms of 2000 abolished the third tier of government. Until the 1990s, it also contained Bannu Division. After the passing of the 25th Amendment in 2018, the South Waziristan Tribal Agency was added to the division.

== List of the Districts ==
| # | District | Headquarter | Area (km²) | Pop. (2023) | Density (ppl/km²) (2023) | Lit. rate (2023) |
|---|---|---|---|---|---|---|
| 1 | Upper South Waziristan | Spinkai | 2,815 | 488,438 | 173.5 | 31.96% |
| 2 | Lower South Waziristan | Wana | 3,805 | 400,237 | 105.2 | 31.96% |
| 3 | Paharpur | Paharpur | | | | |
| 4 | Tank | Tank | 2,900 | 470,293 | 162.2 | 40.67% |
| 5 | Dera Ismail Khan | Dera Ismail Khan | 9,334 | 1,829,811 | 196.1 | 46.58% |

== List of the Tehsils ==
| # | Tehsil | Area (km²) | Pop. (2023) | Density (ppl/km²) (2023) | Lit. rate (2023) | Districts |
|---|---|---|---|---|---|---|
| 1 | Daraban Tehsil | 1,540 | 149,447 | 97.04 | 26.89% | Dera Ismail Khan District |
| 2 | Drazanda Tehsil | 2,008 | 82,386 | 41.03 | 28.67% | Dera Ismail Khan District |
| 3 | Dera Ismail Khan Tehsil | 1,167 | 767,979 | 658.08 | 56.97% | Dera Ismail Khan District |
| 4 | Kulachi Tehsil | 1,229 | 102,595 | 83.48 | 30.29% | Dera Ismail Khan District |
| 5 | Paroa Tehsil | 1,733 | 320,937 | 185.19 | 35.56% | Dera Ismail Khan District |
| 6 | Paharpur Tehsil | 1,657 | 406,467 | 245.3 | 48.86% | Paharpur District |
| 7 | Paniala Tehsil | ... | ... | ... | ... | Paharpur District |
| 8 | Birmil Tehsil | 923 | 112,757 | 122.16 | 23.06% | Lower South Waziristan District |
| 9 | Shakai Tehsil | ... | ... | ... | ... | Lower South Waziristan District |
| 10 | Toi Khulla Tehsil | 567 | 102,835 | 181.37 | 7.81% | Lower South Waziristan District |
| 11 | Wana Tehsil | 2,315 | 184,645 | 79.76 | 31.29% | Lower South Waziristan District |
| 12 | Ladha Tehsil | 289 | 108,344 | 374.89 | 47.95% | Upper South Waziristan District |
| 13 | Makin Tehsil | 404 | 66,042 | 163.47 | 48.71% | Upper South Waziristan District |
| 14 | Sararogha Tehsil | 813 | 145,118 | 178.5 | 35.07% | Upper South Waziristan District |
| 15 | Sarwakai Tehsil | 398 | 58,804 | 147.75 | 37.67% | Upper South Waziristan District |
| 16 | Shaktoi Tehsil | 177 | 44,332 | 250.46 | 32.93% | Upper South Waziristan District |
| 17 | Shawal Tehsil | ... | ... | ... | ... | Upper South Waziristan District |
| 18 | Tiarza Tehsil | 734 | 65,798 | 89.64 | 27.31% | Upper South Waziristan District |
| 19 | Jandola Tehsil | 1,221 | 44,794 | 36.69 | 33.63% | Tank District |
| 20 | Tank Tehsil | 1,679 | 425,499 | 253.42 | 41.43% | Tank District |

== Demographics ==
Historical population
| Year | Pop. | ±% p.a. |
|---|---|---|
| 1951 | ... | — |
| 1961 | ... | — |
| 1972 | ... | — |
| 1981 | 635,494 | — |
| 1998 | 1,091,211 | +3.23% |
| 2017 | 2,019,017 | +3.29% |
| 2023 | 3,188,779 | +7.91% |

According to 2023 census, Dera Ismail Khan division had a population of 3,188,779 roughly equal to the country of Qatar or the US state of Iowa.

Languages of Dera Ismail Khan Division (2023)
1. Pashto (58.0%)
2. Saraiki (40.1%)
3. Urdu (1.00%)
4. Others (0.90%)

In the 1951 Census of Pakistan, 74.8% of population of Dera Ismail Division was reported to be speaker of Saraiki (labelled as Punjabi), forming a majority. The share of Pashto speakers was 22%.

Religious groups in Dera Ismail Khan Division (British North-West Frontier Province era)
| Religious group | 1881 | | 1891 | | 1901 | | 1911 | | 1921 | | 1931 | | 1941 | |
| Religious group | Pop. | % | Pop. | % | Pop. | % | Pop. | % | Pop. | % | Pop. | % | Pop. | % |
|---|---|---|---|---|---|---|---|---|---|---|---|---|---|---|
| Islam | 385,244 | 87.23% | 420,189 | 86.42% | 218,338 | 86.51% | 224,992 | 87.85% | 218,315 | 83.72% | 235,707 | 86% | 255,757 | 85.79% |
| Hinduism | 54,446 | 12.33% | 62,961 | 12.95% | 29,434 | 11.66% | 28,617 | 11.17% | 39,311 | 15.08% | 35,822 | 13.07% | 39,167 | 13.14% |
| Sikhism | 1,691 | 0.38% | 2,840 | 0.58% | 4,362 | 1.73% | 2,175 | 0.85% | 1,904 | 0.73% | 1,878 | 0.69% | 2,390 | 0.8% |
| Christianity | 253 | 0.06% | 204 | 0.04% | 230 | 0.09% | 336 | 0.13% | 1,237 | 0.47% | 657 | 0.24% | 810 | 0.27% |
| Zoroastrianism | 13 | 0% | 7 | 0% | 0 | 0% | 0 | 0% | 0 | 0% | 0 | 0% | 0 | 0% |
| Jainism | 2 | 0% | 0 | 0% | 15 | 0.01% | 0 | 0% | 0 | 0% | 0 | 0% | 1 | 0% |
| Buddhism | 0 | 0% | 0 | 0% | 0 | 0% | 0 | 0% | 0 | 0% | 0 | 0% | 5 | 0% |
| Judaism | —N/a | —N/a | 0 | 0% | 0 | 0% | 0 | 0% | 0 | 0% | 0 | 0% | 1 | 0% |
| Others | 0 | 0% | 0 | 0% | 0 | 0% | 0 | 0% | 0 | 0% | 0 | 0% | 0 | 0% |
| Total population | 441,649 | 100% | 486,201 | 100% | 252,379 | 100% | 256,120 | 100% | 260,767 | 100% | 274,064 | 100% | 298,131 | 100% |
Note: British North-West Frontier Province era figures are for Dera Ismail Khan District, which roughly corresponds to present-day Dera Ismail Khan Division.

== Constituencies ==
| Provincial Assembly Constituency | National Assembly Constituency | District |
|---|---|---|
| PK-109 Upper South Waziristan | NA-42 South Waziristan Upper-cum-South Waziristan Lower | Upper South Waziristan |
| PK-110 Lower South Waziristan | NA-42 South Waziristan Upper-cum-South Waziristan Lower | Lower South Waziristan |
| PK-108 Tank | NA-43 Tank-cum-Dera Ismail Khan | Tank |
| PK-111 Dera Ismail Khan-I | NA-43 Tank-cum-Dera Ismail Khan | Dera Ismail Khan |
| PK-112 Dera Ismail Khan-II | NA-44 Dera Ismail Khan-I | Dera Ismail Khan |
| PK-113 Dera Ismail Khan-III | NA-44 Dera Ismail Khan-I | Dera Ismail Khan |
| PK-114 Dera Ismail Khan-IV | NA-45 Dera Ismail Khan-II | Dera Ismail Khan |
| PK-115 Dera Ismail Khan-V | NA-45 Dera Ismail Khan-II | Dera Ismail Khan |
