= List of tehsils of Khyber Pakhtunkhwa =

In Pakistan, a tehsil is an administrative sub-division of a District. Those are sub-divided into union councils. Here is a list of all the tehsils of the Khyber Pakhtunkhwa.

== List of the tehsils ==
Tehsil	Area (km²)	Population (2023)	Density (ppl/km²) (2023)	Literacy rate (2023)	Districts	Division
Baka Khel Tehsil	367	192,797	107.84	28.25%	Bannu District	Bannu Division
Bannu Tehsil	228	644,909	106.97	49.46%	Bannu District	Bannu Division
Domel Tehsil	425	224,428	115.54	41.38%	Bannu District	Bannu Division
Kakki Tehsil	66	92,021	109.01	42.62%	Bannu District	Bannu Division
Miryan Tehsil	141	166,473	1,180.66	31.77%	Bannu District	Bannu Division
Wazir Tehsil	745	37,262	50.02	16.33%	Bannu District	Bannu Division
Bettani Tehsil	132	35,571	269.48	31.62%	Lakki Marwat District	Bannu Division
Ghazni Khel Tehsil	1,153	329,775	286.01	54.29%	Lakki Marwat District	Bannu Division
Lakki Marwat Tehsil	1,388	341,693	246.18	50.06%	Lakki Marwat District	Bannu Division
Sari Naurang Tehsil	623	333,817	535.82	42.66%	Lakki Marwat District	Bannu Division
Datta Khel Tehsil	1,807	92,196	100.53	30.63%	North Waziristan District	Bannu Division
Dossali Tehsil	250	50,524	100.29	33.02%	North Waziristan District	Bannu Division
Gharyum Tehsil	320	18,931	102.01	17.74%	North Waziristan District	Bannu Division
Ghulam Khan Tehsil	191	31,015	99.33	8.44%	North Waziristan District	Bannu Division
Mir Ali Tehsil	605	229,647	107.7	38.31%	North Waziristan District	Bannu Division
Miran Shah Tehsil	402	123,317	102.02	36.53%	North Waziristan District	Bannu Division
Razmak Tehsil	191	49,367	134.63	26.62%	North Waziristan District	Bannu Division
Shewa Tehsil	393	44,126	112.28	38.36%	North Waziristan District	Bannu Division
Spinwam Tehsil	548	54,209	99.82	23.47%	North Waziristan District	Bannu Division
Daraban Tehsil	1,540	149,447	97.04	26.89%	Dera Ismail Khan District	Dera Ismail Khan Division
Drazanda Tehsil	2,008	82,386	41.03	28.67%	Dera Ismail Khan District	Dera Ismail Khan Division
Dera Ismail Khan Tehsil	1,167	767,979	658.08	56.97%	Dera Ismail Khan District	Dera Ismail Khan Division
Kulachi Tehsil	1,229	102,595	83.48	30.29%	Dera Ismail Khan District	Dera Ismail Khan Division
Paharpur Tehsil	1,657	406,467	245.3	48.86%	Dera Ismail Khan District	Dera Ismail Khan Division
Paniala Tehsil	...	...	...	...	Dera Ismail Khan District	Dera Ismail Khan Division
Paroa Tehsil	1,733	320,937	185.19	35.56%	Dera Ismail Khan District	Dera Ismail Khan Division
Birmil Tehsil	923	112,757	122.16	23.06%	Lower South Waziristan District	Dera Ismail Khan Division
Shakai Tehsil	...	...	...	...	Lower South Waziristan District	Dera Ismail Khan Division
Toi Khulla Tehsil	567	102,835	181.37	7.81%	Lower South Waziristan District	Dera Ismail Khan Division
Wana Tehsil	2,315	184,645	79.76	31.29%	Lower South Waziristan District	Dera Ismail Khan Division
Ladha Tehsil	289	108,344	374.89	47.95%	Upper South Waziristan District	Dera Ismail Khan Division
Makin Tehsil	404	66,042	163.47	48.71%	Upper South Waziristan District	Dera Ismail Khan Division
Sararogha Tehsil	813	145,118	178.5	35.07%	Upper South Waziristan District	Dera Ismail Khan Division
Sarwakai Tehsil	398	58,804	147.75	37.67%	Upper South Waziristan District	Dera Ismail Khan Division
Shaktoi Tehsil	177	44,332	250.46	32.93%	Upper South Waziristan District	Dera Ismail Khan Division
Shawal Tehsil	...	...	...	...	Upper South Waziristan District	Dera Ismail Khan Division
Tiarza Tehsil	734	65,798	89.64	27.31%	Upper South Waziristan District	Dera Ismail Khan Division
Jandola Tehsil	1,221	44,794	36.69	33.63%	Tank District	Dera Ismail Khan Division
Tank Tehsil	1,679	425,499	253.42	41.43%	Tank District	Dera Ismail Khan Division
Abbottabad Tehsil	1,285	1,003,339	101.76	78.39%	Abbottabad District	Hazara Division
Havelian Tehsil	342	256,754	98.8	76.08%	Abbottabad District	Hazara Division
Lora Tehsil	187	98,717	97.22	73.73%	Abbottabad District	Hazara Division
Lower Tanawal Tehsil	153	60,262	98.88	71.66%	Abbottabad District	Hazara Division
Allai Tehsil	804	218,149	271.33	35.71%	Allai District	Hazara Division
Batagram Tehsil	497	335,984	676.02	41.20%	Batagram District	Hazara Division
Ghazi Tehsil	595	151,839	255.19	69.69%	Haripur District	Hazara Division
Haripur Tehsil	834	836,058	1,002.47	76.07%	Haripur District	Hazara Division
Khanpur Tehsil	296	186,886	631.37	73.76%	Haripur District	Hazara Division
Bataira / Kolai	170	142,660	839.18	15.93%	Kolai-Palas District	Hazara Division
Palas	1,240	137,502	110.89	23.08%	Kolai-Palas District	Hazara Division
Bankad Tehsil	331	205,851	621.91	20.14%	Lower Kohistan District	Hazara Division
Pattan Tehsil	311	134,166	431.4	24.61%	Lower Kohistan District	Hazara Division
Baffa Pakhal	640	460,090	718.89	60.85%	Mansehra District	Hazara Division
Bala Kot Tehsil	2,376	310,339	130.61	67.50%	Mansehra District	Hazara Division
Darband Tehsil	102	51,702	506.88	50.47%	Mansehra District	Hazara Division
Mansehra Tehsil	700	723,325	1,033.32	68.70%	Mansehra District	Hazara Division
Oghi Tehsil	307	251,721	819.94	52.85%	Mansehra District	Hazara Division
Tanawal Tehsil	...	...	...	...	Mansehra District	Hazara Division
Daur Maira Tehsil	86	50,503	587.24	25.92%	Torghar District	Hazara Division
Judba Tehsil	63	63,083	1,001.32	19.78%	Torghar District	Hazara Division
Khander Hassanzai Tehsil	305	86,859	284.78	38.66%	Torghar District	Hazara Division
Dassu Tehsil	1,958	148,914	76.05	15.11%	Upper Kohistan District	Hazara Division
Harban Basha Tehsil	...	...	...	25.49%	Upper Kohistan District	Hazara Division
Kandia Tehsil	1,926	165,232	85.79	13.71%	Upper Kohistan District	Hazara Division
Seo Tehsil	258	59,557	230.84	38.19%	Upper Kohistan District	Hazara Division
Doaba Tehsil	...	...	...	...	Hangu District	Kohat Division
Hangu Tehsil	669	280,883	419.86	48.63%	Hangu District	Kohat Division
Tall Tehsil	428	248,019	579.48	36.70%	Hangu District	Kohat Division
Banda Daud Shah Tehsil	...	...	...	53.95%	Karak District	Kohat Division
Karak Tehsil	1,299	339,983	261.73	67.76%	Karak District	Kohat Division
Takht-e-Nasrati Tehsil	607	298,151	491.19	69.55%	Karak District	Kohat Division
Dara Adam Khel Tehsil	446	139,839	313.54	58.90%	Kohat District	Kohat Division
Gumbat Tehsil	503	124,530	247.57	54.55%	Kohat District	Kohat Division
Kohat Tehsil	911	817,610	897.49	58.19%	Kohat District	Kohat Division
Lachi Tehsil	1,131	152,682	135	63.39%	Kohat District	Kohat Division
Central Kurram Tehsil	1,470	358,670	243.99	20.97%	Kurram District	Kohat Division
Lower Kurram Tehsil	940	150,945	160.58	38.15%	Kurram District	Kohat Division
Upper Kurram Tehsil	970	275,819	284.35	49.07%	Kurram District	Kohat Division
Central Orakzai Tehsil	399	92,819	232.63	34.79%	Orakzai District	Kohat Division
Ismail Zai Tehsil	275	39,328	143.01	34.20%	Orakzai District	Kohat Division
Lower Orakzai Tehsil	565	125,944	222.91	41.86%	Orakzai District	Kohat Division
Upper Orakzai Tehsil	299	129,470	433.01	23.98%	Orakzai District	Kohat Division
Bar Chamarkand Tehsil	13	3,574	104.41	23.81%	Bajaur District	Malakand Division
Barang Tehsil	159	90,082	100.27	23.39%	Bajaur District	Malakand Division
Khar Bajaur Tehsil	238	301,778	102.81	33.28%	Bajaur District	Malakand Division
Mamund Tehsil	250	358,190	103.29	24.48%	Bajaur District	Malakand Division
Nawagai Tehsil	216	93,850	103.2	27.39%	Bajaur District	Malakand Division
Salarzai Tehsil	220	316,767	101.01	19.90%	Bajaur District	Malakand Division
Utman Khel Tehsil	194	123,719	100.66	31.50%	Bajaur District	Malakand Division
Chagharzai Tehsil	218	125,949	577.75	38.27%	Buner District	Malakand Division
Daggar Tehsil	290	192,776	664.74	47.57%	Buner District	Malakand Division
Gadezai Tehsil	472	197,466	418.36	44.22%	Buner District	Malakand Division
Gagra Tehsil	217	179,087	825.29	46.22%	Buner District	Malakand Division
Khudu Khel Tehsil	343	136,560	398.13	45.10%	Buner District	Malakand Division
Mandanr Tehsil	325	185,031	569.33	39.47%	Buner District	Malakand Division
Chitral Tehsil	6,127	211,374	34.5	70.20%	Lower Chitral District	Malakand Division
Drosh Tehsil	331	109,033	329.4	57.38%	Lower Chitral District	Malakand Division
Adenzai Tehsil	372	378,915	1,018.59	62.19%	Lower Dir District	Malakand Division
Balambat Tehsil	...	...	...	...	Lower Dir District	Malakand Division
Khal Tehsil	...	...	...	...	Lower Dir District	Malakand Division
Lal Qilla Tehsil	216	247,381	1,145.28	53.29%	Lower Dir District	Malakand Division
Munda Tehsil	...	...	...	...	Lower Dir District	Malakand Division
Samar Bagh Tehsil	419	427,714	1,020.80	45.75%	Lower Dir District	Malakand Division
Timergara Tehsil	576	596,173	1,035.02	64.06%	Lower Dir District	Malakand Division
Sam Ranizai Tehsil	280	353,291	1,261.75	59.13%	Malakand District	Malakand Division
Swat Ranizai Tehsil	672	472,959	703.81	63.57%	Malakand District	Malakand Division
Thana Baizai Tehsil	...	...	...	...	Malakand District	Malakand Division
Utman Khel Tehsil	...	...	...	31.50%	Malakand District	Malakand Division
Alpuri Tehsil	582	366,772	630.19	38.26%	Shangla District	Malakand Division
Bisham Tehsil	184	121,279	659.13	34.77%	Shangla District	Malakand Division
Chakesar Tehsil	335	128,238	382.8	26.08%	Shangla District	Malakand Division
Martung Tehsil	188	103,205	548.96	24.01%	Shangla District	Malakand Division
Makhuzai Tehsil	...	...	...	...	Shangla District	Malakand Division
Shahpur Tehsil	...	...	...	...	Shangla District	Malakand Division
Puran Tehsil	297	171,758	578.31	35.11%	Shangla District	Malakand Division
Babuzai Tehsil	297	696,697	2,345.78	56.06%	Swat District	Malakand Division
Barikot Tehsil	419	220,148	525.41	50.87%	Swat District	Malakand Division
Charbagh Tehsil	161	159,358	989.8	50.01%	Swat District	Malakand Division
Kabal Tehsil	485	480,827	991.4	49.26%	Swat District	Malakand Division
Behrain Tehsil	2,899	270,623	93.35	39.26%	Upper Swat District	Malakand Division
Khwaza Khela Tehsil	392	307,300	783.93	42.63%	Upper Swat District	Malakand Division
Matta Tehsil	684	552,431	807.65	42.54%	Upper Swat District	Malakand Division
Buni Tehsil	...	...	...	...	Upper Chitral District	Malakand Division
Mulkoh Tehsil	...	...	...	...	Upper Chitral District	Malakand Division
Torkoh Tehsil	...	...	...	...	Upper Chitral District	Malakand Division
Mastuj Tehsil	8,392	195,528	23.3	73.83%	Upper Chitral District	Malakand Division
Barawal Tehsil	...	...	...	...	Upper Dir District	Malakand Division
Dir Tehsil	1,012	384,667	380.11	48.26%	Upper Dir District	Malakand Division
Kalkot Tehsil	...	...	...	...	Upper Dir District	Malakand Division
Sharingal Tehsil	1,140	210,356	184.52	37.15%	Upper Dir District	Malakand Division
Lar Jam Tehsil	1,039	119,396	114.91	52.59%	Central Dir District	Malakand Division
Wari Tehsil	508	369,147	726.67	48.56%	Central Dir District	Malakand Division
Akhagram Karo	...	...	...	...	Central Dir District	Malakand Division
Nehag Dara	...	...	...	...	Central Dir District	Malakand Division
Sahib Abad	...	...	...	...	Central Dir District	Malakand Division
Garhi Kapura Tehsil	143	319,465	2,234.02	51.70%	Mardan District	Mardan Division
Katlang Tehsil	422	377,535	894.63	61.47%	Mardan District	Mardan Division
Mardan Tehsil	335	1,040,893	3,107.14	56.41%	Mardan District	Mardan Division
Rustam Tehsil	379	279,527	737.54	49.98%	Mardan District	Mardan Division
Takht Bhai Tehsil	353	727,478	2,060.84	56.02%	Mardan District	Mardan Division
Lahor Tehsil	318	354,383	1,114.41	54.16%	Swabi District	Mardan Division
Razar Tehsil	418	682,303	1,632.30	56.61%	Swabi District	Mardan Division
Swabi Tehsil	389	475,352	1,221.98	63.23%	Swabi District	Mardan Division
Topi Tehsil	418	382,562	915.22	59.83%	Swabi District	Mardan Division
Charsadda Tehsil	445	909,438	2,043.68	58.56%	Charsadda District	Peshawar Division
Shabqadar Tehsil	204	440,524	2,159.43	49.65%	Charsadda District	Peshawar Division
Tangi Tehsil	347	485,542	1,399.26	48.85%	Charsadda District	Peshawar Division
Bagh Maidan Tehsil	...	...	...	...	Khyber District	Peshawar Division
Bara Tehsil	1,430	548,084	383.28	34.72%	Khyber District	Peshawar Division
Bazar Zakha Khel Tehsil	...	...	...	...	Khyber District	Peshawar Division
Fort Salop Tehsil	...	...	...	...	Khyber District	Peshawar Division
Jamrud Tehsil	311	243,290	782.28	46.18%	Khyber District	Peshawar Division
Landi Kotal Tehsil	679	312,313	459.96	38.92%	Khyber District	Peshawar Division
Mula Gori Tehsil	156	42,580	272.95	38.36%	Khyber District	Peshawar Division
Painda Cheena Tehsil	...	...	...	...	Khyber District	Peshawar Division
Ambar Utman Khel Tehsil	273	79,455	291.04	21.71%	Mohmand District	Peshawar Division
Halim Zai Tehsil	211	89,149	422.51	45.18%	Mohmand District	Peshawar Division
Pindiali Tehsil	454	112,247	247.24	29.11%	Mohmand District	Peshawar Division
Pran Ghar Tehsil	257	36,046	140.26	35.46%	Mohmand District	Peshawar Division
Safi Tehsil	322	109,620	340.43	26.21%	Mohmand District	Peshawar Division
Upper Mohmand	513	63,659	124.09	21.62%	Mohmand District	Peshawar Division
Yake Ghund Tehsil	266	63,757	239.69	41.38%	Mohmand District	Peshawar Division
Jehangira Tehsil	718	434,984	100.72	56.92%	Nowshera District	Peshawar Division
Nowshera Tehsil	679	796,226	106.39	56.76%	Nowshera District	Peshawar Division
Pabbi Tehsil	351	509,495	102.42	56.70%	Nowshera District	Peshawar Division
Badhber Tehsil	357	439,912	1,232.25	38.66%	Peshawar District	Peshawar Division
Chamkani Tehsil	226	624,354	2,762.63	54.72%	Peshawar District	Peshawar Division
Hassan Khel Tehsil	261	72,557	278	55.34%	Peshawar District	Peshawar Division
Mathra Tehsil	218	495,059	2,270.91	45.79%	Peshawar District	Peshawar Division
Peshawar City Tehsil	176	2,113,596	12,009.07	60.88%	Peshawar District	Peshawar Division
Peshtakhara Tehsil	135	480,436	3,558.79	45.45%	Peshawar District	Peshawar Division
Shah Alam Tehsil	145	532,848	3,674.81	44.96%	Peshawar District	Peshawar Division

== List of the tehsils by population over the years ==
Tehsil	Population (2023)	Population (2017)	Population (1998)	Population (1981)	Population (1972)	Population (1961)	Population (1951)
Baka Khel Tehsil	192,797	168,300	...	...	...	...	...
Bannu Tehsil	644,909	563,374	...	...	...	...	...
Domel Tehsil	224,428	208,968	...	...	...	...	...
Kakki Tehsil	92,021	82,265	...	...	...	...	...
Miryan Tehsil	166,473	144,164	...	...	...	...	...
Wazir Tehsil	37,262	43,112	...	...	...	...	...
Bettani Tehsil	35,571						
Ghazni Khel Tehsil	329,775						
Lakki Marwat Tehsil	341,693						
Sari Naurang Tehsil	333,817						
Datta Khel Tehsil	92,196						
Dossali Tehsil	50,524						
Gharyum Tehsil	18,931						
Ghulam Khan Tehsil	31,015						
Mir Ali Tehsil	229,647						
Miran Shah Tehsil	123,317						
Razmak Tehsil	49,367						
Shewa Tehsil	44,126						
Spinwam Tehsil	54,209						
Daraban Tehsil	149,447						
Drazanda Tehsil	82,386						
Dera Ismail Khan Tehsil	767,979						
Kulachi Tehsil	102,595						
Paharpur Tehsil	406,467						
Paniala Tehsil	...						
Paroa Tehsil	320,937						
Birmil Tehsil	112,757						
Shakai Tehsil	...						
Toi Khulla Tehsil	102,835						
Wana Tehsil	184,645						
Ladha Tehsil	108,344	77,883	72,278	132,756	...	...	...
Makin Tehsil	66,042	58,646	30,528	24,238	...	...	...
Sararogha Tehsil	145,118	98,180	72,063	21,355	...	...	...
Sarwakai Tehsil	58,804	54,540	31,472	32,676	...	...	...
Shaktoi Tehsil	44,332	32,959	...	...	...	...	...
Shawal Tehsil	...	...	...	...	...	...	...
Tiarza Tehsil	65,798	45,156	37,708	22,207	...	...	...
Jandola Tehsil	44,794						
Tank Tehsil	425,499						
Abbottabad Tehsil	1,003,339						
Havelian Tehsil	256,754						
Lora Tehsil	98,717						
Lower Tanawal Tehsil	60,262						
Allai Tehsil	218,149						
Batagram Tehsil	335,984						
Ghazi Tehsil	151,839						
Haripur Tehsil	836,058						
Khanpur Tehsil	186,886						
Bataira / Kolai	142,660						
Palas	137,502						
Bankad Tehsil	205,851						
Pattan Tehsil	134,166						
Baffa Pakhal	460,090						
Bala Kot Tehsil	310,339						
Darband Tehsil	51,702						
Mansehra Tehsil	723,325						
Oghi Tehsil	251,721						
Tanawal Tehsil	...						
Daur Maira Tehsil	50,503						
Judba Tehsil	63,083						
Khander Hassanzai Tehsil	86,859						
Dassu Tehsil	148,914						
Harban Basha Tehsil	...						
Kandia Tehsil	165,232						
Seo Tehsil	59,557						
Doaba Tehsil	...						
Hangu Tehsil	280,883						
Tall Tehsil	248,019						
Banda Daud Shah Tehsil	...						
Karak Tehsil	339,983						
Takht-e-Nasrati Tehsil	298,151						
Dara Adam Khel Tehsil	139,839						
Gumbat Tehsil	124,530						
Kohat Tehsil	817,610						
Lachi Tehsil	152,682						
Central Kurram Tehsil	358,670						
Lower Kurram Tehsil	150,945						
Upper Kurram Tehsil	275,819						
Central Orakzai Tehsil	92,819						
Ismail Zai Tehsil	39,328						
Lower Orakzai Tehsil	125,944						
Upper Orakzai Tehsil	129,470						
Bar Chamarkand Tehsil	3,574						
Barang Tehsil	90,082						
Khar Bajaur Tehsil	301,778						
Mamund Tehsil	358,190						
Nawagai Tehsil	93,850						
Salarzai Tehsil	316,767						
Utman Khel Tehsil	123,719						
Chagharzai Tehsil	125,949						
Daggar Tehsil	192,776						
Gadezai Tehsil	197,466						
Gagra Tehsil	179,087						
Khudu Khel Tehsil	136,560						
Mandanr Tehsil	185,031						
Chitral Tehsil	211,374						
Drosh Tehsil	109,033						
Adenzai Tehsil	378,915						
Balambat Tehsil	...						
Khal Tehsil	...						
Lal Qilla Tehsil	247,381						
Munda Tehsil	...						
Samar Bagh Tehsil	427,714						
Timergara Tehsil	596,173						
Sam Ranizai Tehsil	353,291						
Swat Ranizai Tehsil	472,959						
Thana Baizai Tehsil	...	...	...	...	...	...	...
Utman Khel Tehsil	...	...	...	...	...	...	...
Alpuri Tehsil	366,772						
Bisham Tehsil	121,279						
Chakesar Tehsil	128,238						
Martung Tehsil	103,205						
Makhuzai Tehsil	...	...	...	...	...	...	...
Shahpur Tehsil	...	...	...	...	...	...	...
Puran Tehsil	171,758						
Babuzai Tehsil	696,697						
Barikot Tehsil	220,148						
Behrain Tehsil	270,623						
Charbagh Tehsil	159,358						
Kabal Tehsil	480,827						
Khwaza Khela Tehsil	307,300						
Matta Tehsil	552,431						
Buni Tehsil	...	...	...	...	...	...	...
Mulkoh Tehsil	...	...	...	...	...	...	...
Torkoh Tehsil	...	...	...	...	...	...	...
Mastuj Tehsil	195,528						
Barawal Tehsil	...	...	...	...	...	...	...
Dir Tehsil	384,667						
Kalkot Tehsil	...	...	...	...	...	...	...
Sharingal Tehsil	210,356						
Lar Jam Tehsil	119,396						
Wari Tehsil	369,147						
Akhagram Karo	...	...	...	...	...	...	...
Nehag Dara	...	...	...	...	...	...	...
Sahib Abad	...	...	...	...	...	...	...
Garhi Kapura Tehsil	319,465						
Katlang Tehsil	377,535						
Mardan Tehsil	1,040,893						
Rustam Tehsil	279,527						
Takht Bhai Tehsil	727,478						
Lahor Tehsil	354,383						
Razar Tehsil	682,303						
Swabi Tehsil	475,352						
Topi Tehsil	382,562						
Charsadda Tehsil	909,438						
Shabqadar Tehsil	440,524						
Tangi Tehsil	485,542						
Bagh Maidan Tehsil	...						
Bara Tehsil	548,084						
Bazar Zakha Khel Tehsil	...						
Fort Salop Tehsil	...						
Jamrud Tehsil	243,290						
Landi Kotal Tehsil	312,313						
Mula Gori Tehsil	42,580						
Painda Cheena Tehsil	...						
Ambar Utman Khel Tehsil	79,455						
Halim Zai Tehsil	89,149						
Pindiali Tehsil	112,247						
Pran Ghar Tehsil	36,046						
Safi Tehsil	109,620						
Upper Mohmand Tehsil (Baizai Tehsil)	63,659						
Yake Ghund Tehsil	63,757						
Jehangira Tehsil	434,984						
Nowshera Tehsil	796,226						
Pabbi Tehsil	509,495						
Badhber Tehsil	439,912	384,916	...	...	...	...	...
Chamkani Tehsil	624,354						
Hassan Khel Tehsil	72,557						
Mathra Tehsil	495,059						
Peshawar City Tehsil	2,113,596						
Peshtakhara Tehsil	480,436						
Shah Alam Tehsil	532,848						

== See also ==
- List of tehsils of Khyber Pakhtunkhwa by literacy rate
- List of tehsils in Pakistan
  - Tehsils of Sindh
  - Tehsils of Balochistan
  - Tehsils of Punjab, Pakistan
  - Tehsils of Azad Kashmir
  - Tehsils of Gilgit-Baltistan
- Districts of Pakistan
  - Districts of Khyber Pakhtunkhwa
  - Districts of Punjab, Pakistan
  - Districts of Balochistan, Pakistan
  - Districts of Sindh
  - Districts of Azad Kashmir
  - Districts of Gilgit-Baltistan
