= Bara Tehsil =

Coordinates: 33°55′N 71°28′E

Bara تحصیل باڑہ باړه تحصیل
- Tehsil
- Location of Bara Tehsil in the Federally Administered Tribal Areas
- Country: Pakistan
- Region: Khyber Pakhtunkhwa
- District: Khyber District
- Headquarters: Bara

Government
  - Chairman: Mufti Muhammad Kafeel (JUI(F))
  - Assistance Political Agent: Ismatullah Wazir

Population (2017)
  - Total: 444,403
- Time zone: UTC+5 (PST)

Bara Tehsil (Urdu: باڑہ) is a subdivision located in Khyber District, Khyber Pakhtunkhwa, Pakistan.

== Geography ==
=== Adjacent administrative units ===
- Nazyan District, Nangarhar Province, Afghanistan (north)
- Landi Kotal Tehsil (north)
- Jamrud Tehsil (northeast)
- Peshawar Tehsil, Peshawar District, Khyber Pakhtunkhwa (east)
- Frontier Region Kohat (southeast)
- Lower Orakzai Tehsil, Orakzai Agency (south)
- Central Orakzai Tehsil, Orakzai Agency (south)
- Upper Orakzai Tehsil, Orakzai Agency (southwest)
- Central Kurram Tehsil, Kurram Agency (west)
- Haska Meyna District, Nangarhar Province, Afghanistan (northwest)
- Achin District, Nangarhar Province, Afghanistan (northwest)

== Demographics ==
Historical population
Year	Pop.	±%
1972	242,315	—
1981	142,501	−41.2%
1998	286,184	+100.8%
2017	444,403	+55.3%

Bara Tehsil has a population of 444,403 and has 51,869 households according to the 2017 census.

== Education ==
There are about 400 schools and colleges in Bara Tehsil. A total of 102 schools have been destroyed during a ten-year-long period of militancy in the region, and around 64,000 students have abandoned education.

== Transportation ==
Bara Tehsil is linked to Peshawar by the Peshawar-Bara road. Peshawar-Bara road was closed from 2009 to 2013 in an operation to contain growing militancy.

== See also ==
- List of tehsils of Khyber Pakhtunkhwa
- Bara, Khyber Pakhtunkhwa
- Bara Rifles
