= Upper South Waziristan District =

Upper South Waziristan ضلع بالائی جنوبی وزیرستان پورتنۍ جنوبي وزیرستان ولسوالۍ
- District of Khyber Pakhtunkhwa
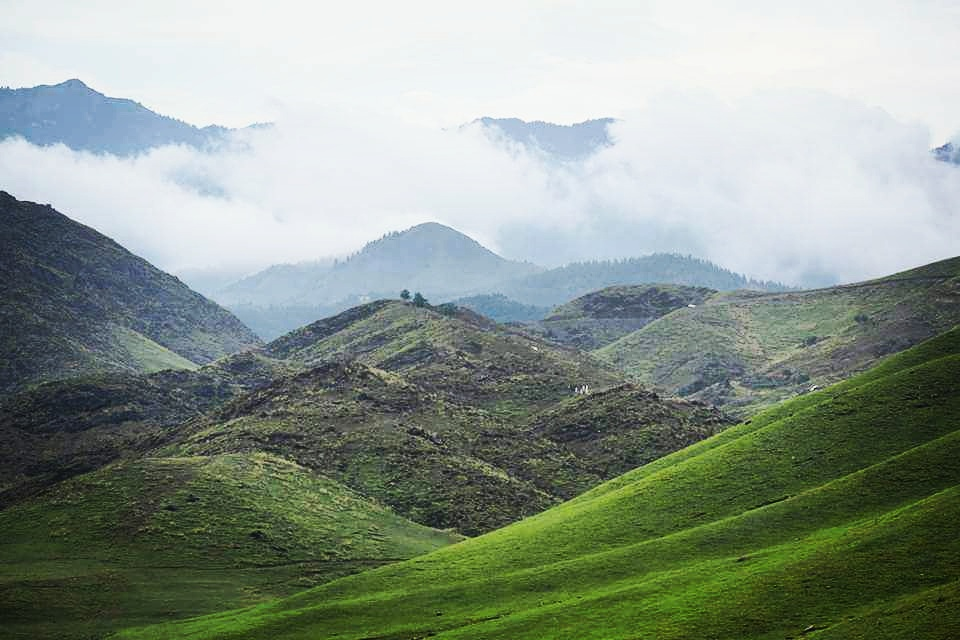
- Pir Ghar, Baddar

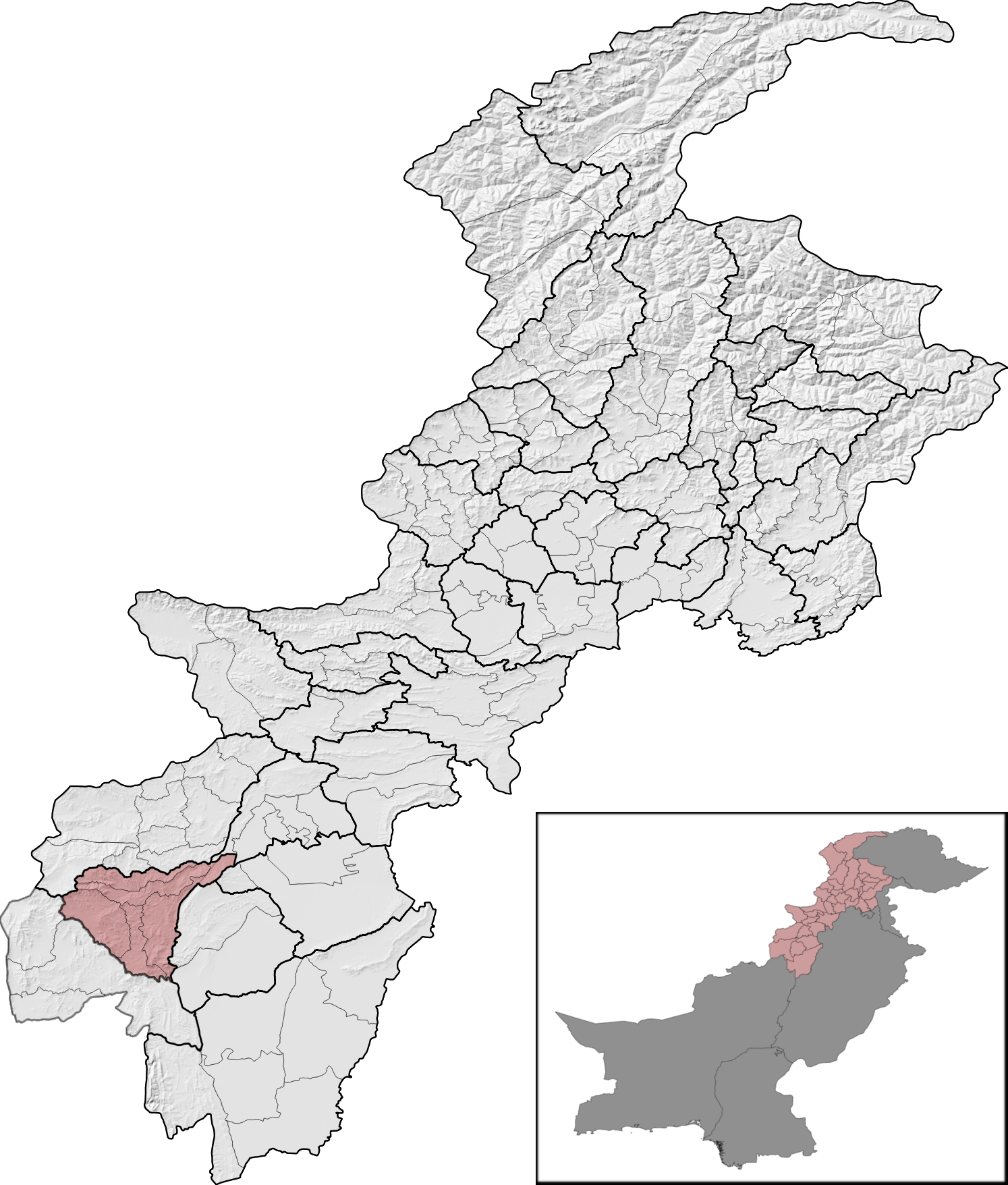
- Upper South Waziristan District (red) in Khyber Pakhtunkhwa
- Country: Pakistan
- Province: Khyber Pakhtunkhwa
- Division: Dera Ismail Khan
- Established: 13 April 2022
- Headquarters: Spinkai

Government
  - Type: District Administration
  - Mayor: N/A
  - Deputy Commissioner: Mr. Ashfaq Khan (BPS-18 PCS)
  - District Police Officer: Niaz Muhammad (BPS-18 PSP)

Area
  - Total: 2,815 km^{2} (1,087 sq mi)

Population (2017)
  - Total: 367,364
  - Density: 130.5/km^{2} (338.0/sq mi)

Literacy
  - Literacy rate: Total: 31.96%; Male: 42.63%; Female: 20.38%
- Time zone: UTC+5 (PST)
- Number of Tehsils: 5
- Languages: Pashto • Urdu

Upper South Waziristan District (Urdu: ضلع بالائی جنوبی وزیرستان; Pashto: پورتنۍ جنوبي وزیرستان ولسوالۍ) is a district located in the Khyber Pakhtunkhwa province of Pakistan. The Upper South Waziristan District was established on 13 April 2022 when the South Waziristan District was bifurcated into Lower South Waziristan and Upper South Waziristan. Spinkai ragzai region was declared as its capital.

== Demographics ==
=== Population ===
Historical population
Year	Pop.	±% p.a.
1951	...	—
1961	...	—
1972	...	—
1981	...	—
1998	...	—
2017	367,364	—
2023	...	—

At the time of the 2017 census, the area that would become the Upper South Waziristan district had 50,745 households and a population of 367,364, entirely rural. Upper South Waziristan had a sex ratio of 908 females per 1000 males and a literacy rate of 38.65% - 57.01% for males and 18.58% for females. 129,568 (37.61%) were under 10 years of age. 110 (0.03%) were from religious minorities. Pashto was the predominant language, spoken by 95.48% of the population. 3.21% of the population spoke 'Other' languages, most likely Ormuri.

== Administration ==
The district is divided into the following tehsils:

Tehsil	Name (Urdu) (Pashto)	Area (km²)	Pop. (2023)	Density (ppl/km²) (2023)	Literacy rate (2023)	Union Councils
Ladha Tehsil	(Urdu: تحصیل لدھا)(Pashto: لده تحصیل)	289	108,344	374.89	47.95%	
Makin Tehsil	(Urdu: تحصیل مکین)(Pashto: مکین تحصیل)	404	66,042	163.47	48.71%	
Sararogha Tehsil		813	145,118	178.5	35.07%	
Sarwakai Tehsil	(Urdu: تحصیل سرویکائی)(Pashto: سروکۍ تحصیل)	398	58,804	147.75	37.67%	
Shaktoi Tehsil		177	44,332	250.46	32.93%	
Shawal Tehsil		...	...	...	...	
Tiarza Tehsil	(Urdu: تحصیل تیارزه)(Pashto: تیارزه تحصیل)	734	65,798	89.64	27.31%	

== Geography ==
- Lower South Waziristan District

== See also ==
- Districts of Pakistan
  - Districts of Khyber Pakhtunkhwa
  - Districts of Punjab, Pakistan
  - Districts of Balochistan, Pakistan
  - Districts of Sindh, Pakistan
  - Districts of Azad Kashmir
  - Districts of Gilgit-Baltistan
- Divisions of Pakistan
  - Divisions of Balochistan
  - Divisions of Khyber Pakhtunkhwa
  - Divisions of Punjab, Pakistan
  - Divisions of Sindh
  - Divisions of Azad Kashmir
  - Divisions of Gilgit-Baltistan
