= Daggar Tehsil =

Administrative unit in Khyber Pakhtunkhwa, Pakistan

Daggar Tehsil تحصیل ڈگر ډاګر تحصیل
- Tehsil
- Interactive map of Daggar Tehsil
- Country: Pakistan
- Region: Khyber Pakhtunkhwa
- District: Buner

Population (2017)
  - Total: 355,692
- Time zone: UTC+5 (PST)
  - Summer (DST): UTC+6 (PDT)

Daggar is a tehsil (administrative unit) located in Buner District, Khyber Pakhtunkhwa, Pakistan.

The population is 355,692 according to the 2017 Census of Pakistan.

Other Tehsils (administrative units) within Buner District are:

- Chagharzai Tehsil
- Gadezai Tehsil
- Gagra Tehsil
- Khudu Khel Tehsil
- Mandanr Tehsil

Daggar Tehsil has over 51 towns and villages located within it per 2017 Pakistani census.

== Notable people ==
- Said Rahim (born 1950) - politician

== See also ==
- List of tehsils of Khyber Pakhtunkhwa
