= Serwekai =

Serwekai سرویکائی سروکۍ
- Country: Pakistan
- Territory: Federally Administered Tribal Areas
- Agency: South Waziristan
- Tehsil: Serwekai
- Elevation: 1,286 m (4,219 ft)
- Time zone: UTC+5 (PST)

Serwekai (Pashto: سروکۍ) is a town, tehsil, and subdivision of South Waziristan in the Federally Administered Tribal Areas of Pakistan. Serwekai is one of the three subdivisions of South Waziristan, along with Ladha and Wanna. The subdivision of Serwekai is further divided into two Tehsils: Serwekai and Tiarza.

== Notable people ==
- Manzoor Pashteen, human rights activist and founder of the Pashtun Tahafuz Movement

== See also ==
- Manzoor Pashteen
- Pashtun Tahafuz Movement
- Waziristan Education City at Serwekai
