= Waziristan =

Mountainous region in Khyber Pakhtunkhwa, Pakistan

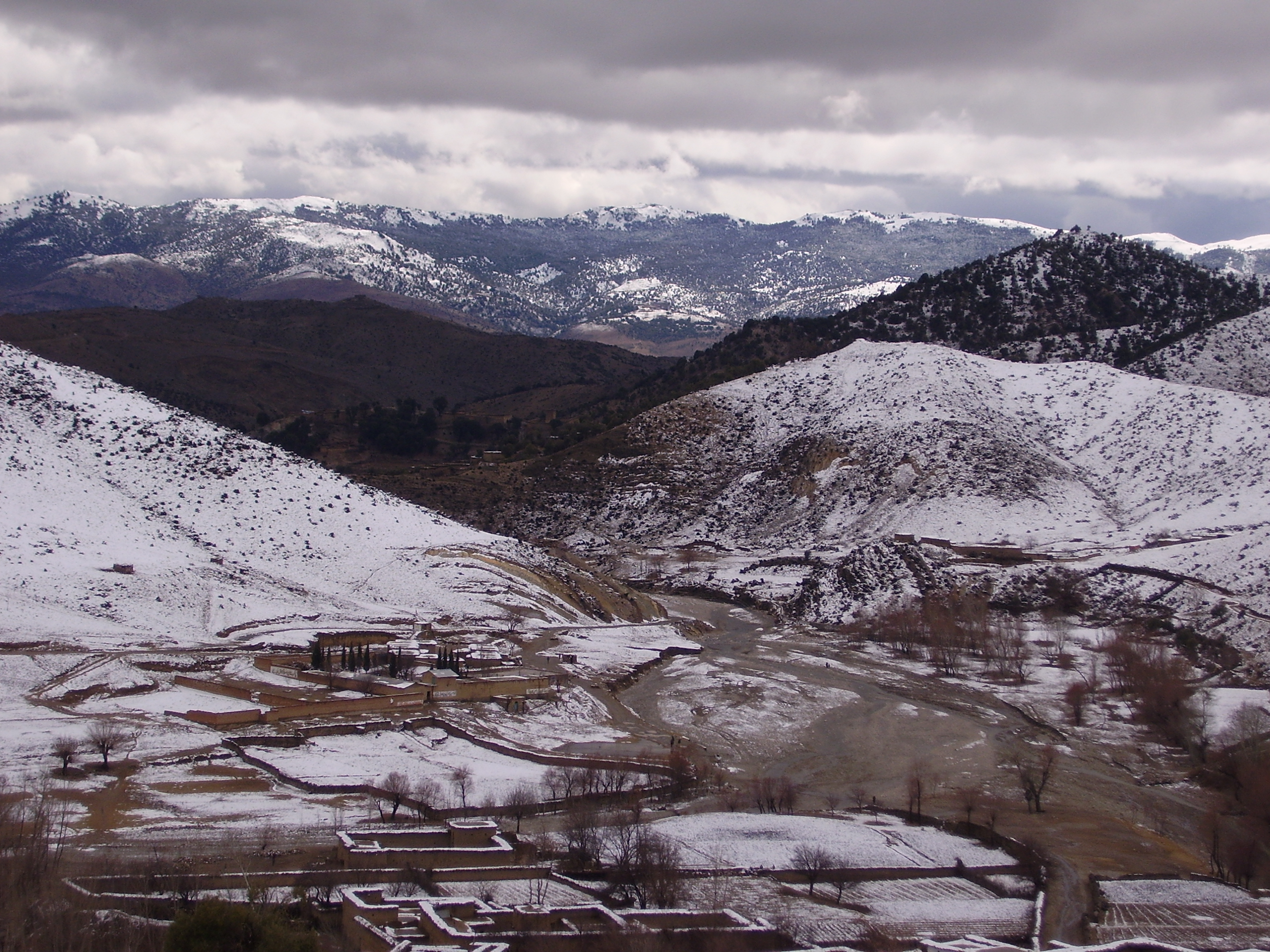
Waziristan

Waziristan (Pashto, Ormuri, Urdu: وزیرستان, lit. 'land of the Wazir') is a mountainous region of the Pakistani province of Khyber Pakhtunkhwa. The Waziristan region administratively splits among three districts: North Waziristan, Lower South Waziristan District, and Upper South Waziristan District. The entire Waziristan region covers around 11,585 square kilometres (4,500 sq mi).

== Overview and history ==
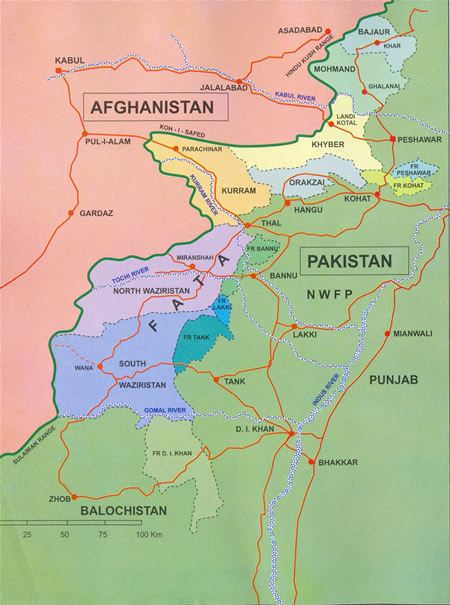
North (purple) and South (blue) Waziristan and surrounding Federally Administered Tribal Areas and provinces

Waziristan lies between the Kurram River and the Gomal River. It borders the Kurram Agency in the north, Bannu in the northeast, Tank in the east, Dera Ismail Khan in the southeast, Sherani and Musakhel districts of Balochistan in the south and Khost, Paktia, and Paktika provinces of Afghanistan in the west.

Waziristan is divided into two districts, North Waziristan and South Waziristan. According to the 2017 census report, the population of North Waziristan was 543,254 while that of South Waziristan was 674,065. The two parts have quite distinct characteristics, though both are inhabited by the Wazir and Mahsud (or Maseed ) tribes. They have a reputation as formidable warriors.

=== British Era ===
The British entered Waziristan in 1894, when the boundary with Afghanistan, known as the Durand Line was determined. They divided Waziristan into two agencies, North Waziristan and South Waziristan; they also introduced a regular system of land record and revenue administration for the most fertile part of the Tochi valley. After the British military operations, a Political Agent for South Waziristan was permanently appointed with its headquarters at Wanna; another was appointed for North Waziristan with headquarters at Miranshah.

=== Waziristan Revolt (1919–1920) ===
A flag used by a resistance movement in Waziristan against the British during the 1930s, with the Takbir written on it

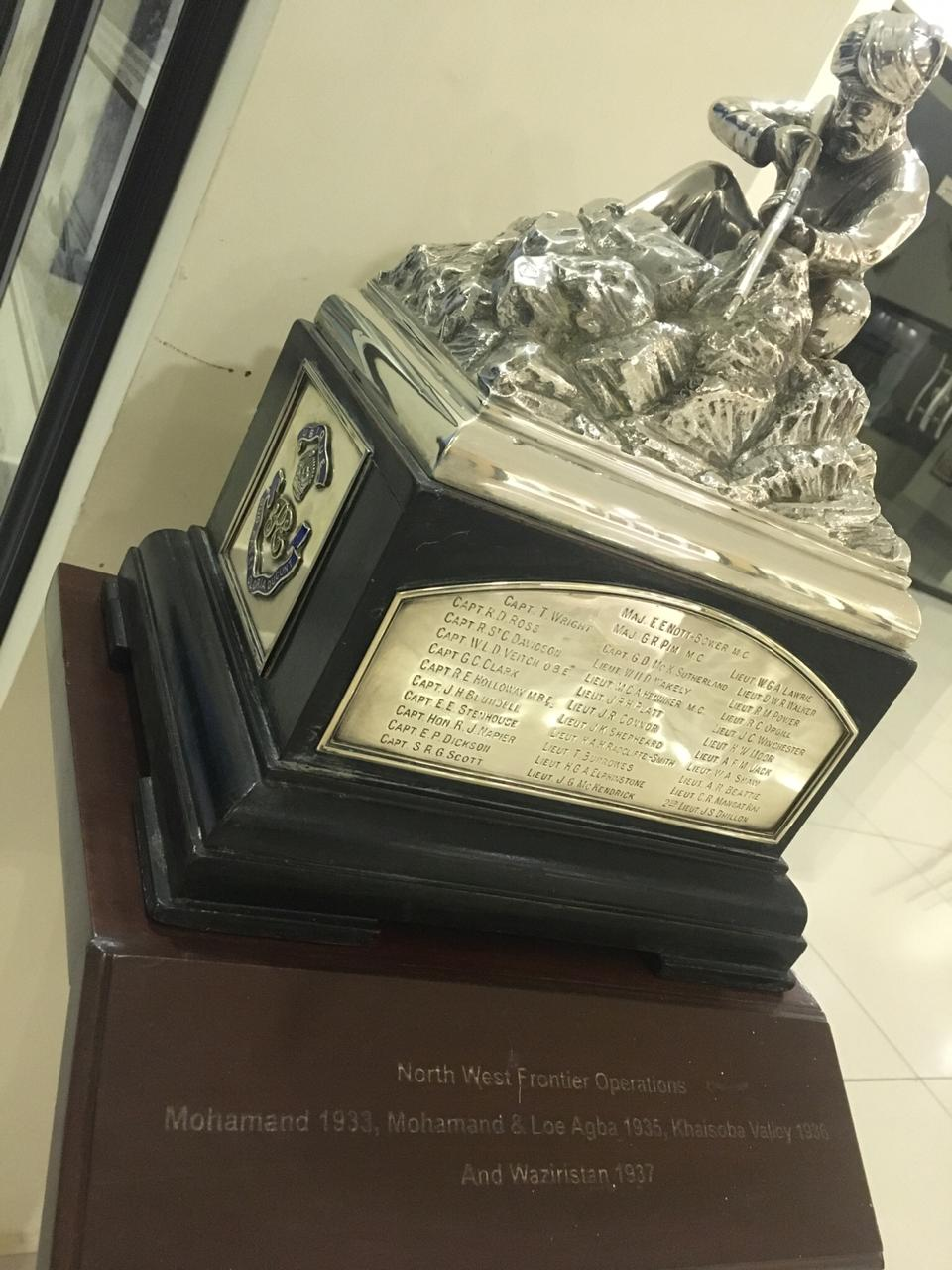
Souvenir presented by British Officers who took part in Waziristan operation 1937 depicting Tribal Marksman in an ambush against British Indian Forces.

In the rugged and remote region of Waziristan on British India's northwest border with Afghanistan, mountain tribes of Muslim fighters rebelled against the British Indian Army in numerous operations. The Waziristan Revolt of 1919–1920 was sparked by the Afghan invasion of British India in 1919. Though the British made peace with the Afghans, the Waziri and Mahsud tribesmen gave the imperial (almost entirely Indian) forces a very difficult fight. Some of the tribesmen were veterans of the British-organised local militias that were irregular elements of the British Indian Army, and used some modern Lee–Enfield rifles against the British Indian forces sent into Waziristan. One aspect of this conflict was the effective use of air power against the Waziris and Mahsuds. This is similar to Royal Air Force tactics in suppressing the Arab Revolt in Iraq in 1920 and 1921.

=== Faqir of Ipi ===
In 1935–36, a Hindu-Muslim clash occurred over a Hindu girl of Bannu, who was abducted and forced to convert to Islam. The tribesmen rallied around Mirzali Khan, a Tori Khel Wazir, who was later given the title of "the Faqir of Ipi" by the British. Jihad was declared against the British. Mirzali Khan, with his huge lashkar (force), started a guerrilla warfare against the British forces in Waziristan.

In 1938, Mirzali Khan shifted from Ipi to Gurwek, a remote village on the Durand Line, where he declared an independent state and continued the raids against the British forces. In June 1947, Mirzali Khan, along with his allies, including the Khudai Khidmatgars and members of the Provincial Assembly, declared the Bannu Resolution. The resolution demanded that the Pashtuns be given a choice to have an independent state of Pashtunistan, composing all Pashtun majority territories of British India, instead of being made to join Pakistan. However, the British Raj refused to comply with the demand of this resolution. After the creation of Pakistan in August 1947, Mirzali Khan and his followers refused to recognise Pakistan, and launched a campaign against Pakistan. They continued their guerilla warfare against the new nation's government. He didn't surrender to the government of Pakistan throughout his life but his movement diminished after 1954 when his Commander-in-chief surrendered to the Pakistani authorities. Towards the end of his life, he expressed regret and said that Afghanistan deceived and used him for its political gains in the name of Islam. He also instructed his supporters that they should never help Afghanistan against Pakistan with any plots made against Pakistan.

=== U.S. war on terror ===
In the early stage of the U.S. invasion of Afghanistan, when the Taliban started fleeing into Pakistan, the local leaders, or Maliks, began a campaign among their locals to host the foreigners. Since then, around 200 Maliks have been assassinated by the local Taliban through targeted killings.

To end the Waziristan war, Pakistan signed the Waziristan Accord with chieftains from the self-styled Islamic Emirate of Waziristan on 5 September 2006. The Islamic militants in Waziristan are said to have close affiliations with the Taliban. Waziristan is often mentioned as a haven for al-Qaeda fighters. There is speculation that some al-Qaeda leaders have found refuge in the area controlled by the Emirate, which is a staging ground for militant operations in Afghanistan.

On 4 June 2007, the National Security Council of Pakistan met to decide the fate of Waziristan and take up a number of political and administrative issues to control the "Talibanization" of the area. The meeting was chaired by President Pervez Musharraf and attended by the Chief Ministers and Governors of all four provinces. They discussed the deteriorating law and order situation and the threat posed to state security. The government decided to take a number of actions to stop the "Talibanization" and to crush the armed militancy in the Tribal regions and the NWFP.

Due to the ongoing military operations against the Taliban, nearly 100,000 people have already fled to Afghanistan's Khost province to seek shelter. The UN and other aid agencies are helping more than 470,000 people who have been displaced from Pakistan's North Waziristan region due to the ongoing military operations.

The Ministry of the Interior has played a large part in the information gathering for the operations against the militants and their institutions. The Ministry of the Interior has prepared a list of militant commanders operating in the region and they have also prepared a list of seminaries for monitoring. (Waziristan is a tribal area, and in any tribal area of Pakistan, police forces are not ordinarily deployed. There are other options like frontier corps (militia) and Khasadar (local tribesmen force).) The government is also trying to strengthen law enforcement in the area by providing the Khyber Pakhtunkhwa Police with weapons, bullet-proof jackets, and night-vision devices. The paramilitary Frontier Corps is to be provided with artillery and APCs. State agencies are actively exploring methods to disrupt unauthorized FM radio channels through jamming techniques.

The US drone strikes programme has been responsible for numerous bombings in Waziristan, carried out with the approval of the Pakistani government.

The Wazir tribes are divided into clans governed by male village elders who meet in a tribal jirga. Socially and religiously, Waziristan is an extremely conservative area. Women are carefully guarded, and every household must be headed by a male figure. Tribal cohesiveness is also kept strong by means of the so-called Collective Responsibility Acts in the Frontier Crimes Regulations, which has since been repealed following the merger of FATA to Khyber Pakhtunkhwa in May 2018.

Taliban presence in the area has been an issue of international concern in the war on terrorism particularly since the 2001 invasion of Afghanistan. In 2014, about 929,859 people were reported to be internally displaced from Waziristan as a result of Operation Zarb-e-Azb, a military offensive conducted by the Pakistan Armed Forces along the Pakistan – Afghanistan border.

== North Waziristan ==
North Waziristan's capital is Miranshah. The area is mostly inhabited by the Dawar Tribe and the Utmanzai branch of the Darwesh Khel Waziris, who are related to Ahmedzai Waziris of South Waziristan, including Razmak, Datta Khel, Spin wam, Dosali, Shawa and Shawal. The Dawars (also known as Daurr or Daur), who live in the main Tochi Valley, farm in the valleys below in villages including Miranshah, Hamzoni, Darpakhel, Muhammadkhel, Boya, Degan, Banda, Ngharkali, Palangzai, Mirali, Edak, Hurmaz, Mussaki, Hassukhel, Ziraki, Tapi, Issori, Haiderkhel and Khaddi irrigated by the river Tochi.

== Dissolution of South Waziristan ==
The South Waziristan was a district with its district headquarters at Wanna. South Waziristan, comprising about 6,500 square kilometres (2,500 mi^{2}), previously was the most volatile agency of Pakistan. Up until 2021 it was not under the direct administration of the government of Pakistan, South Waziristan was previously and indirectly governed by a political agent, who has been either an outsider or a Waziri—a system inherited from the British Raj. From January 2021 to April 2022, South Waziristan served as a district of the adjacent KPK province. In south Waziristan Agency, there are three tribes, Ahmadzai Wazir, Mahsud and Burki. Burki and Urmar are the same tribe. In 2022, Government of Khyber-Pakhtunkhwa led by PTI decided to divide South Waziristan District into two districts, Lower South Waziristan District, and Upper South Waziristan District.

== Pakistan's new Waziristan strategy ==
On 4 June 2007, the National Security Council of Pakistan met to decide the fate of Waziristan and take up a number of political and administrative decisions to control "Talibanization" of the area. The meeting was chaired by president Pervez Musharraf and it was attended by the Chief Ministers and Governors of all four provinces. They discussed the deteriorating law and order situation and the threat posed to state security.

The government decided to take a number of actions to stop the "Talibanization" and crush the armed militancy in the Tribal regions and Khyber Pakhtunkhwa.

The NSC of Pakistan has decided the following actions will be taken to achieve the goals:

- Deployment of unmanned reconnaissance planes
- Strengthening law-enforcement agencies with advanced equipment
- Deployment of more troops to the region
- Operations against militants on fast-track basis
- Focused operations against militant commanders
- Action against madrassahs preaching militancy
- Appointment of regional coordinators
- Fresh recruitments of police officers in Khyber Pakhtunkhwa

The ministry of interior has played a large part in the information gathering for the operations against militants and their institutions. The Ministry of Interior has prepared a list of militant commanders operating in the region and they have also prepared a list of seminaries for monitoring.

The government is also trying to strengthen the law enforcement in the area by providing the Khyber Pakhtunkhwa Police with weapons, bulletproof jackets and night-vision devices. The paramilitary Frontier Corps will be provided with artillery and armoured personnel carriers. The state agencies are also working on studying ways to block FM frequencies of illegal FM radio channels.

== See also ==
- Bannu Division
- Mirzali Khan
- Mulla Powinda
- Insurgency in Khyber Pakhtunkhwa
- Ghoriwala
- Razmak
