= Paroa =

Paroa may refer to:

- Paroa, Khyber Pakhtunkhwa, Pakistan
- Paroa, Bay of Plenty, a settlement in the Bay of Plenty region of New Zealand
- Paroa, West Coast, a settlement on the West Coast of New Zealand
