= Banda Daud Shah Tehsil =

Banda Daud Shah Tehsil تحصیل بانڈہ داؤد شاہ بانډه داود شاه تحصیل
- Tehsil
- Country: Pakistan
- Region: Khyber Pakhtunkhwa
- District: Karak
- Seat: Banda Daud Shah

Government
  - Type: Local Government
  - Chairman: Inayat Ullah (PTI)

Area
  - Total: 1,438 km^{2} (555 sq mi)
- Elevation: 585 m (1,919 ft)

Population (177,744 2023)
  - Total: 177,744
- Time zone: UTC+5 (PST)
  - Summer (DST): UTC+5 (PST)
- Postal code: 26400

Banda Daud Shash is Headquarter of BD Shah Tehsil a tehsil located in Karak District, Khyber Pakhtunkhwa, Pakistan. The population of Tehsil is 177,744 according to the 2023 census.

== Administration ==
Banda Daud shah is administratively divided into 14 village councils namely:

- Bahadur Khel
- Darish Khel
- Khurram Muhammad Zai
- Dagar Nari
- Nari Panos
- Jatta Ismail Khel
- Makori
- Mami Khel
- Teri Chapri
- Teri
- Ahmadi Banda
- Esak Khumari
- Mardan Khel
- Gurguri Ourbashi

== Mouza's ==
There are 52 mouza's in BD Shah.

== Patwar Halqa's ==
There is 13 patwar halqa in this tehsil namely:

- Bahadar khel
- Darish Khel
- Khurram Muhammad zai
- Dagar Nari
- Nari Panos
- Jatta Ismail Khel
- Makori 1
- Makori 2
- Teri 1
- Teri 2
- Esak Khumari
- Mardan Khel
- Gurguri Ourbashi

== Qanungoi Circles ==
There are two qanungoi circles name:

- Bahadar khel
- BD Shah

== Natural Resources ==
BD Shah is rich in natural resources owing it to its geology. The resources include Oil & gas, rock salt, Gypsum and limestone. The Nashpa oil & gas field which is located in the Jatta Ismail khel region of BD Shah has a production of 11,683 barrels of oil per day and 89.17 MMscfd gas as of 2022. Adding to that, there was another discovery of a reservoir (of 22 million cubic feet of gas and more than 2100 barrels of oil per day) in the Tal block in BD Shah. Bahadur khel, a region in BD Shah is known for rock salts reservoirs with a purity of about 95% NaCl along with impurities in shape of gypsum and limestone. BD shah is also rich in gypsum and limestone. The provincial government is planning to build a salt and gypsum city in Banda Daud Shah.

== Education ==
Literacy rate of BD shah is 46.1%. The major educational institutions includes:

- Government Degree college BD shah
- Cadet College Teri

== Notable people ==
- Alif Jana Khattaka
- Nasir Khan Khattak
- [./Https://www.tiktok.com/@devil_khattak_1%3F_r=1&_t=ZS-97hb8leBXRn Muhammad Raziq Khattak urbashi]

== See also ==
- List of tehsils of Khyber Pakhtunkhwa
