= Batara, Buner =

Pakistani administrative unit

Coordinates: 34°32′N 72°38′E

Batara
- Union Council
- Interactive map of Batara
- Country: Pakistan
- Province: Khyber Pakhtunkhwa
- District: Buner
- Time zone: UTC+5 (PST)
- Number of towns: ADD HERE

Batara is a Union council of Buner District in the Khyber Pakhtunkhwa province of Pakistan. It is located in eastern Buner District and is part of Chagharzai Tehsil.

== See also ==
- Buner District
