= Pulrah =

- Village and union council
- Location in Pakistan
- Coordinates: 34°20′07″N 73°03′22″E
- Country: Pakistan
- Region: Khyber-Pakhtunkhwa
- District: Mansehra District
- Time zone: UTC+5 (PST)

Pulrah (پھلرا) is a village and union council (an administrative subdivision) of Tanawal Tehsil, Mansehra District in Khyber-Pakhtunkhwa province of Pakistan. It is located in the south of the district and lies to the west of the district capital Mansehra.
