= Said Rahim =

Pakistani politician

Said Rahim MPA

Member of the Provincial Assembly of Khyber Pakhtunkhwa
- In office 2008–2013
- Constituency: PK-79 (Buner-III)

Personal details
- Born: 3 March 1950 (age 76) Daggar
- Party: Awami National Party (ANP)
- Occupation: Politician

Said Rahim is a Pakistani politician from Daggar Buner District, who was a member of the Khyber Pakhtunkhwa Assembly from 2008 to 2013 belong to the Awami National Party (ANP).
