= Central Kurram Tehsil =

Central Kurram تحصیل کرم وسطی منځنی کرم تحصیل
- Tehsil
- Location in Pakistan Central Kurram (Pakistan)
- Coordinates: 33°40′47″N 70°28′48″E
- Country: Pakistan
- Region: Khyber Pakhtunkhwa
- District: Kurram District

Population (2017)
  - Total: 229,356
- Time zone: UTC+5 (PST)

Central Kurram Tehsil is a subdivision located in Kurram District, Khyber Pakhtunkhwa, Pakistan. The population is 229,356 according to the 2017 census.

== History ==
Central Kurram was previously known as F.R. Kurram until it was renamed in 2004.

== Demographics ==
Unlike Upper and Lower Kurram, Central Kurram is mostly inhabited by Sunni Pashtun tribes.

== See also ==
- List of tehsils of Khyber Pakhtunkhwa
