= Paroa, Khyber Pakhtunkhwa =

Coordinates: 31°33′25″N 70°45′32″E

Paroa پاروا پاروا
- Town and Union Council
- Interactive map of Paroa
- Country: Pakistan
- Province: Khyber Pakhtunkhwa
- District: Dera Ismail Khan
- Tehsil: Paroa

Government
  - Chairman: Fakhar Ullah Khan (IND)

Population (2023)
  - Total: 42,005
- Time zone: UTC+5 (PST)

Paroa is a town and union council of Dera Ismail Khan District in Khyber Pakhtunkhwa province of Pakistan, subordinate to Paroa Tehsil. It is located at 31°33'25N 70°45'32E and has an altitude of 154 metres (508 feet).

== Demographics ==
=== Population ===
Historical population
Year	Pop.	±% p.a.
1951	...	—
1961	...	—
1972	...	—
1981	...	—
1998	...	—
2017	39,881	—
2023	42,005	+0.87%

As of the 2023 census, Paroa had a population of 42,005.
