= Kandia Tehsil =

Kandia Tehsil تحصیل کندیا کندیا تحصیل
- Tehsil
- Country: Pakistan
- Region: Khyber Pakhtunkhwa
- District: Upper Kohistan District

Government
  - Chairman: Anwar Kakar (JUI(F))

Population (2017)
  - Total: 84,055
- Time zone: UTC+5 (PST)
  - Summer (DST): UTC+6 (PDT)

Kandia is a tehsil located in the Upper Kohistan District of Khyber Pakhtunkhwa, Pakistan. It consists of five union councils: Karang, Thoti, Kareen, Jashoi and Gabrial. The population is 84,055 according to the 2017 census.

The Karang union council has four villages: Dansh, Karang Khas, Berti and Bagroo. Union council Garial has six villages: Nakao, Mirshahi, Mulakhel Gabrial, Shadomkhel Gabrial, Bagh Seri and Barigo. Union council Kareen has two villages: Kareen and Sergarhi. Union council Jashoi has three villages: Seyal Khas Dong, Siyal Dara and Jajshoi. Union council Thoti has four villages: Kafarbanda, Eleel, Serto and Thoti. Thoti union council is also known for its tourism.

== Lekhi Thoti Dara ==
This Darra (Valley) has dense forests, plains, waterfalls, large pastures, high mountains, and lakes where fishing and camping facilities are available. kachrhee, jabba, Rong, Rong 02, Danao Bhurjun, Dhaki, Baik, Muhree Rong, Dhand, etc. are seen inviting tourists with their beauty. The Kandia was created as a tehsil upon the splitting-away of the Kandia valley from the Dassu tehsil administration area, 23 km away. It was upgraded to a subdivision on 31 May 2018. Kandia is part of the Upper Kohistan District, and the Kandia valley merges with the Indus.

== The Kandia valley ==
The Kandia valley road follows the Kandia Nuddi watercourse (21° 19' 60 N, 86° 55' 0 E), 371 km from Islamabad. It abuts Ghizer (Shoundoor) on the North, Kalam on the south, and Tashkand on the east. The valley four union councils which are UC Thoti, UC Kareen, UC Jashoi, UC Karang and UC Gabral. According to the 2017 census, the total population of the valley was 84400. The valley of the Kandia is prone to natural disasters, primarily avalanches and flooding; in August 2011, over 60 people were killed and hundreds of farm livestock swept away by floods. The Kandia valley road was washed away by extensive flooding, making access to the valley extremely difficult; a 33-kilometre-long (21 mi) road was constructed and carpeted by ERRA amounting to Rs.805 million. After the flood of July 2010, all the road has totally washed away and the access of the inhabitants were too difficult to the main market (Komila), so many diseases attacked the people and died before any health treatments.

== See also ==
- List of tehsils of Khyber Pakhtunkhwa
