= Upper Mohmand Tehsil =

Upper MohmandTehsil تحصیل مہمند بالا پورتنۍ مومندو تحصیل
- Tehsil
- Country: Pakistan
- Region: Khyber Pakhtunkhwa
- District: Mohmand District

Government
  - Chairman: Hafiz Taj Wali (JUI(F))

Population (2017)
  - Total: 51,068
- Time zone: UTC+5 (PST)

Upper Mohmand Tehsil is a subdivision located in Mohmand District, Khyber Pakhtunkhwa, Pakistan. The population is 51,068 according to the 2017 census.

== See also ==
- Baizai
- List of tehsils of Khyber Pakhtunkhwa
