= Judba Tehsil =

Judba Tehsil تحصیل جدبا جدبا تحصیل
- Tehsil
- Country: Pakistan
- Region: Khyber Pakhtunkhwa
- District: Torghar District

Government
  - Chairman: Haji Muhammad Khan (JUI(F))

Population (2017)
  - Total: 96,757
- Time zone: UTC+5 (PST)
  - Summer (DST): UTC+6 (PDT)

Judba is a tehsil located in Torghar District, Khyber Pakhtunkhwa, Pakistan. The population is 96,757 according to the 2017 census.

== See also ==
- List of tehsils of Khyber Pakhtunkhwa
