= Prang Ghar =

Prang Ghar تحصیل پڑانگ غار پړانګ غار تحصیل
- Tehsil
- Interactive map of Prang Ghar
- Coordinates: 34.4132°N 71.6420°E
- Country: Pakistan
- Region: Khyber Pakhtunkhwa
- District: Mohmand District

Population (2017)
  - Total: 35,290
- Time zone: UTC+5 (PST)

Prang Ghar is a tehsil located in Mohmand District, Khyber Pakhtunkhwa, Pakistan. It's about 70 km from Peshawar. The population is 35,290 according to the 2017 census.

The region is divided into two parts: Upper Prang Ghar, where people belong to Umar Khel (a sub tribe of Utmankhel), and Lower Prang Ghar, where people belong to Pakhi Kor, Shahdad Kor, Denikhel, Mulaguri, Zerak and Miagan. There are Three small dams which are used for agricultural purposes and fishing. The Mohmand Dam is also located in Prang Ghar. The Swat River separates Prang Ghar from other tehsils of the Mohmand District. There are many famous shrines of Sufi saints located in the green hills of Upper Prang Ghar, such as Yousaf Baba, Babagan in Pai Khan and Isa Baba in Ziarat Lower Prang Ghar. Most of the people are former, Businessesman, overseas workers or government servants.

== Geography ==
The land is mostly hilly and sandy, which is very suitable for the agricultural production of tomatoes and onions. Most of the land is barani and some is irrigated through tubewells or dams. The Kohi Hindukush mountain range starts from Prang Ghar and extends up to Dir and Chitral. The hills are rich in minerals such as nephrite, chromite, marbles, Quartz, Soap stone. It has three high schools for boys, two girls higher schools and high secondary school.

== Education ==
There is one higher secondary school and three high schools for both boys and girls.

== Villages ==
There are three village and one NC. NC55 Prang Ghar (Shadad Kor) VC1 (Pakhi Kor, Mulaguri) VC2 ( Denikhel, Zerak) VC3 (Umar Khel)

== See also ==
- List of tehsils of Khyber Pakhtunkhwa
