= Yake Ghund Tehsil =

Yake Ghund Tehsil تحصیل یکہ غنڈ یکه غنډ تحصیل
- Tehsil
- Country: Pakistan
- Region: Khyber Pakhtunkhwa
- District: Mohmand District

Population (2017)
  - Total: 52,291
- Time zone: UTC+5 (PST)

Ekka Ghund Tehsil is a subdivision located in Mohmand District, Khyber Pakhtunkhwa, Pakistan. The population is 52,291 according to the 2017 census.

== See also ==
- List of tehsils of Khyber Pakhtunkhwa
