= Gharyum Tehsil =

Gharyum Tehsil تحصیل گھریوم ګریوم تحصیل
- Tehsil
- Country: Pakistan
- Region: Khyber Pakhtunkhwa
- District: North Waziristan

Population (2017)
  - Total: 11,780
- Time zone: UTC+5 (PST)

Gharyum Tehsil is a subdivision located in North Waziristan District, Khyber Pakhtunkhwa, Pakistan. The population is 11,780 according to the 2017 census.

== See also ==
- List of tehsils of Khyber Pakhtunkhwa
