= Kakki Tehsil =

Pakistani administrative area

- Tehsil
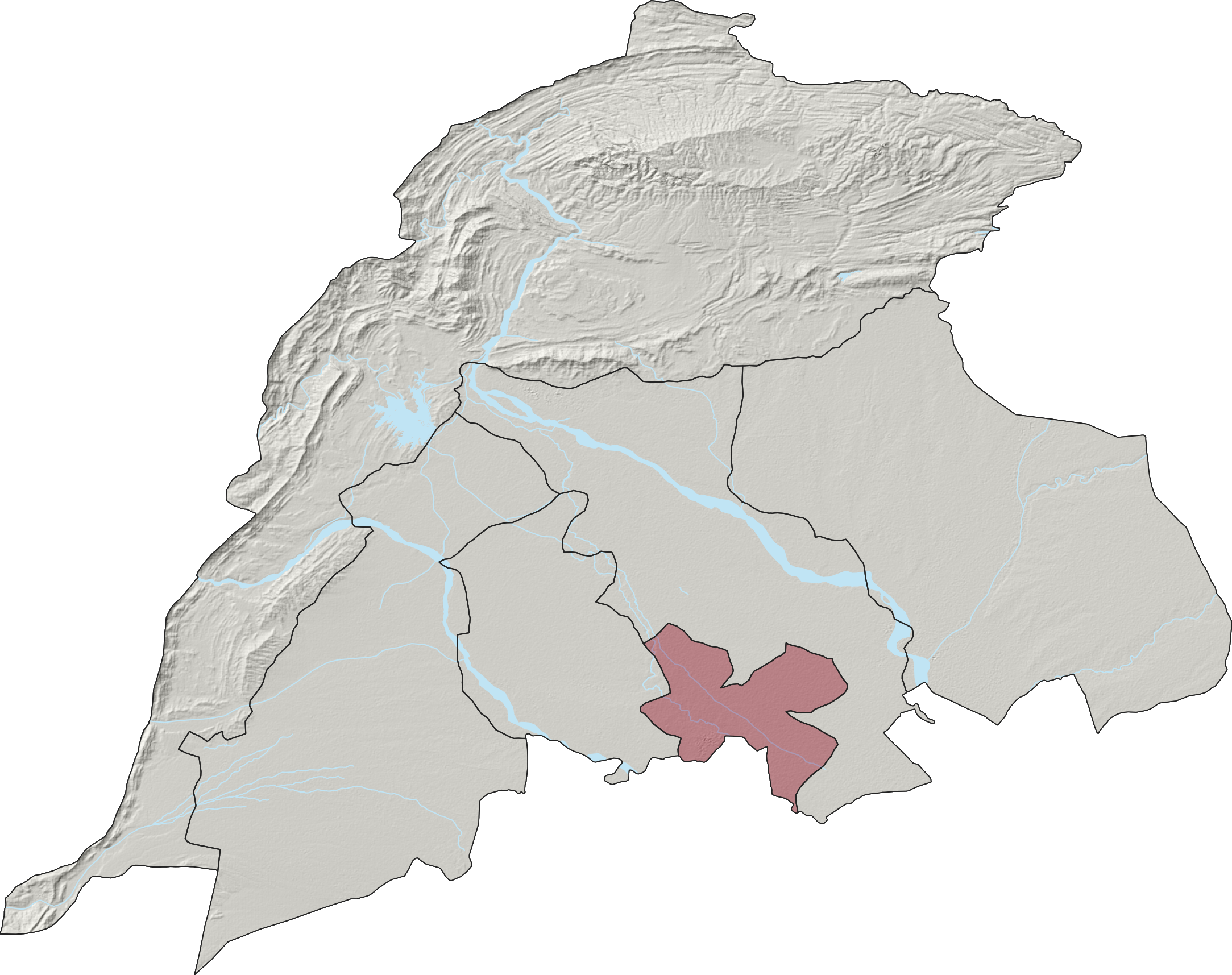
- Kakki Tehsil (red) in Bannu District
- Country: Pakistan
- Province: Khyber-Pakhtunkhwa
- District: Bannu District
- Time zone: UTC+5 (PST)
- Language(s): Pashto

Kakki Tehsil is an administrative subdivision (tehsil) of Bannu District in the Bannu Division of Khyber Pakhtunkhwa Province, Pakistan. The tehsil of Kakki comprises 16 localities with a total population of 92,021 in 2023 of whom 47,994 were male and 44,026 were female, in 2017 the total population was recorded as 113,409. The number of households recorded in the 2023 census was 13,457 - all of which were rural.

== Politics ==
The entirety of Kakki Tehsil forms part of the PK-88 provincial election constituency (some rural areas of neighbouring Bannu Tehsil form the rest) - this constituency is represented by Pakhtoon Yar Khan of the Pakistan Tehreek-e-Insaf party. Kakki Tehsil is now part of the NA-39 Bannu constituency for the National Assembly of Pakistan (formerly NA-35). The tehsil contains 4 Girdawar Circles (a land-revenue subdivision) that in total contain 10 Patwar Circles (the smallest land revenue administrative unit) and 151 Mouzas (revenue areas).

== Geography ==
The tehsil of Kakki is located in the south of Bannu District, to the south lies the district of Lakki Marwat, to the east Miryan Tehsil and to the north and west lies Bannu Tehsil.

== Demography ==
According to the 2023 census the population was distributed as follows:

Age	Total population	Male	Percentage of males	Female	Percentage of females
00 – 04	16,215	8,463	17.64%	7,752	17.62%
05 – 09	14,468	7,743	16.14%	6,725	15.28%
10 – 14	11,183	5,933	12.36%	5,249	11.93%
15 – 19	8,912	4,781	9.96%	4,131	9.39%
20 – 24	7,175	3,679	7.67%	3,496	7.94%
25 – 29	6,805	3,255	6.78%	3,550	8.06%
30 – 34	5,838	2,804	5.85%	3,034	6.89%
35 – 39	4,941	2,558	5.33%	2,383	5.41%
40 – 44	3,807	1,961	4.09%	1,846	4.19%
45 – 49	3,043	1,542	3.21%	1,501	3.41%
50 – 54	2,687	1,387	2.89%	1,300	2.95%
55 – 59	2,052	1,086	2.26%	966	2.19%
60 – 64	1,901	1,048	2.18%	853	1.94%
65 – 69	1,314	766	1.60%	548	1.24%
70 – 74	862	486	1.01%	376	0.85%
75+	818	502	1.05%	316	0.72%
TOTAL	92,021	47,994	100.00%	44,026	100.00%
