= Domel =

Domel Wazir Bagh
- Town and union council
- Interactive map of Domel
- Country: Pakistan
- Region: Khyber-Pakhtunkhwa
- District: Bannu District
- Time zone: IST

Domel (Pashto: ډومېل) also spelled as Domail is a main town in Domel tehsil of Bannu District in Khyber Pakhtunkhwa province of Pakistan. It is also union council of Bannu District in Khyber-Pakhtunkhwa. Domel is inhabited mostly by Ahmadzai Wazir tribe of Pashtuns. Majority of the population follow Islam as their main religion.

== See also ==
- Domel Tehsil
- Bannu District
- Khyber Pakhtunkhwa
