= Dir Tehsil =

- Tehsil
- Country: Pakistan
- Region: Khyber Pakhtunkhwa
- District: Upper Dir

Government
  - Chairman: Rafi Ullah Khan (JI)

Population (2017)
  - Tehsil: 439,577
  - Urban: 44,165
  - Rural: 395,412
- Time zone: UTC+5 (PST)
  - Summer (DST): UTC+6 (PDT)

Dir is a tehsil located in Upper Dir District, Khyber Pakhtunkhwa, Pakistan. The population is 439,577 according to the 2017 census. The tehsil contains one District Population Welfare Office (DPWO) that provides assistance to local population.

== See also ==
- List of tehsils of Khyber Pakhtunkhwa
