= Lower South Waziristan District =

Lower South Waziristan ضلع زیریں جنوبی وزیرستان ښکته جنوبي وزیرستان ولسوالۍ
- District of Khyber Pakhtunkhwa
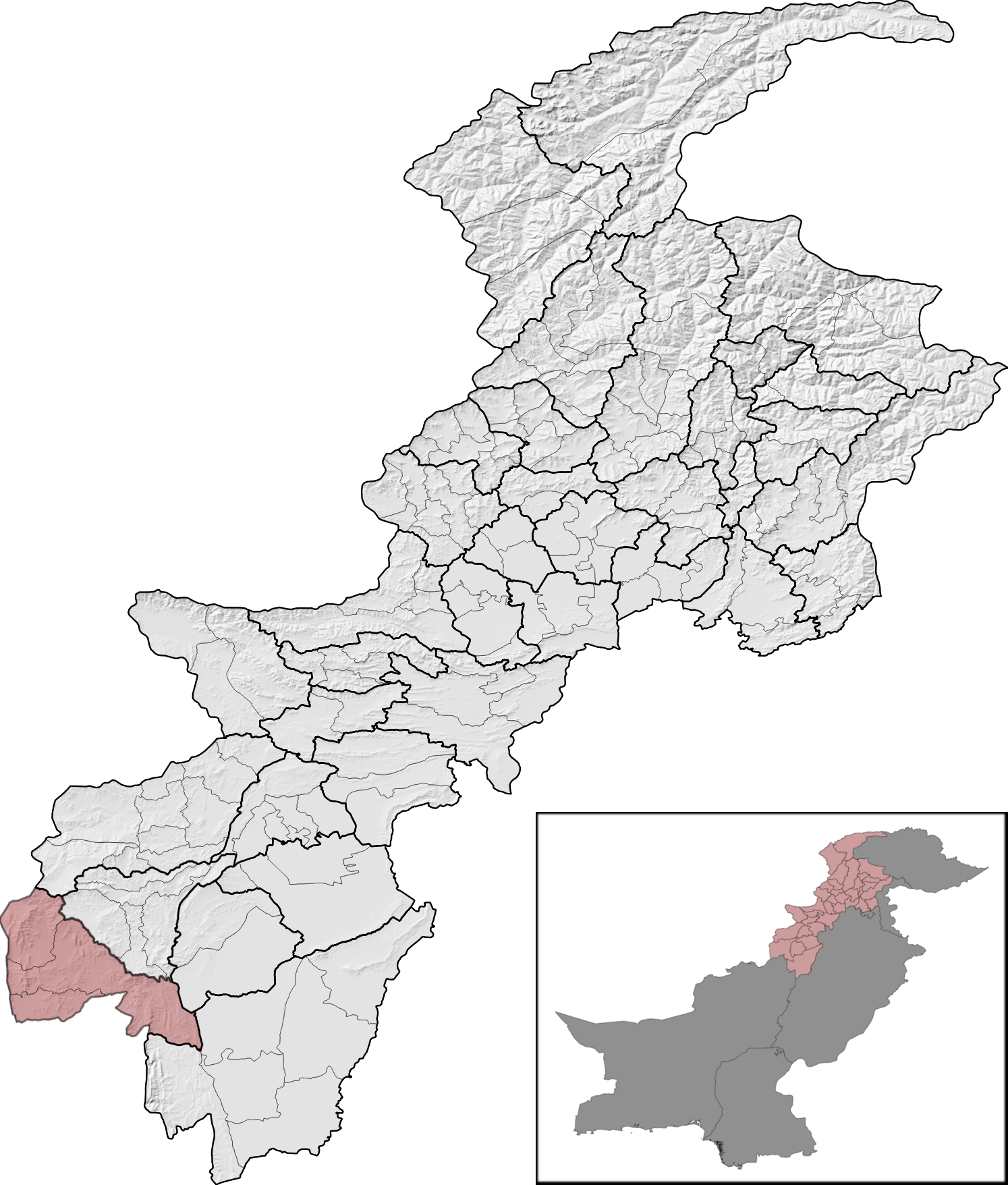
- Lower South Waziristan District (red) in Khyber Pakhtunkhwa
- Country: Pakistan
- Province: Khyber Pakhtunkhwa
- Division: Dera Ismail Khan
- Established: 13 April 2022
- Founder: PTI Government
- Headquarters: Wana

Government
  - Type: District Administration
  - Deputy Commissioner: Mohammad Nasir Khan (BPS-18 PCS)
  - District Police Officer: Farmanullah Khan (BPS-18 PSP)
  - Mayor: N/A

Area
  - Total: 3,805 km^{2} (1,469 sq mi)

Population (2017)
  - Total: 307,851
  - Density: 80.91/km^{2} (209.5/sq mi)

Literacy
  - Literacy rate: Total: 31.96%; Male: 42.63%; Female: 20.38%
- Time zone: UTC+5 (PST)
- Number of Tehsils: 4
- languages: Hindko • Pashto • Urdu

Lower South Waziristan District (Urdu: ضلع زیریں جنوبی وزیرستان; Pashto: ښکته جنوبي وزیرستان ولسوالۍ) ("Mahsood Waziristan" now), is a district located in the Dera Ismail Khan Division of the Khyber Pakhtunkhwa province of Pakistan. The Lower South Waziristan District was created in April 2022 after the South Waziristan District was bifurcated into Lower South Waziristan and Upper South Waziristan. Wana city serves as its capital and district headquarters.

== Demographics ==
At the time of the 2017 census, the area that would become Lower South Waziristan district had 28,938 households and a population of 307,851. The entire population was rural. Lower South Waziristan had a sex ratio of 887 females per 1000 males and a literacy rate of 29.27% - 42.49% for males and 14.06% for females. 115,795 (37.61%) were under 10 years of age. 252 (0.08%) were from religious minorities. Pashto was the predominant language, spoken by 97.82% of the population.

== Administration ==
The district is divided into the following four tehsils:

Tehsil	Name (Urdu) (Pashto)	Area (km²)	Pop. (2023)	Density (ppl/km²) (2023)	Literacy rate (2023)
Birmil Tehsil	(Urdu: تحصیل برمل)(Pashto: برمل تحصیل)	923	112,757	122.16	23.06%
Shakai Tehsil		...	...	...	...
Toi Khulla Tehsil	(Urdu: تحصیل توئی خلہ)(Pashto: توي خولا تحصیل)	567	102,835	181.37	7.81%
Wana Tehsil	(Urdu: تحصیل وانا)(Pashto: واڼه تحصیل)	2,315	184,645	79.76	31.29%

== See also ==
- Upper South Waziristan District
