= Banda Daud Shah =

Town in Pakistan

Coordinates: 33°16′0″N 71°11′0″E

Banda Daud Shah is a town in Karak District of the Khyber-Pakhtunkhwa province of Pakistan It is located at 33°16'0N 71°10'60E and has an average elevation of 596 metres (1958 feet) and is the capital of Banda Daud Shah Tehsil.
