= Upper Kohistan District =

Upper Kohistan District ضلع کوہستان بالا
- District of Khyber Pakhtunkhwa
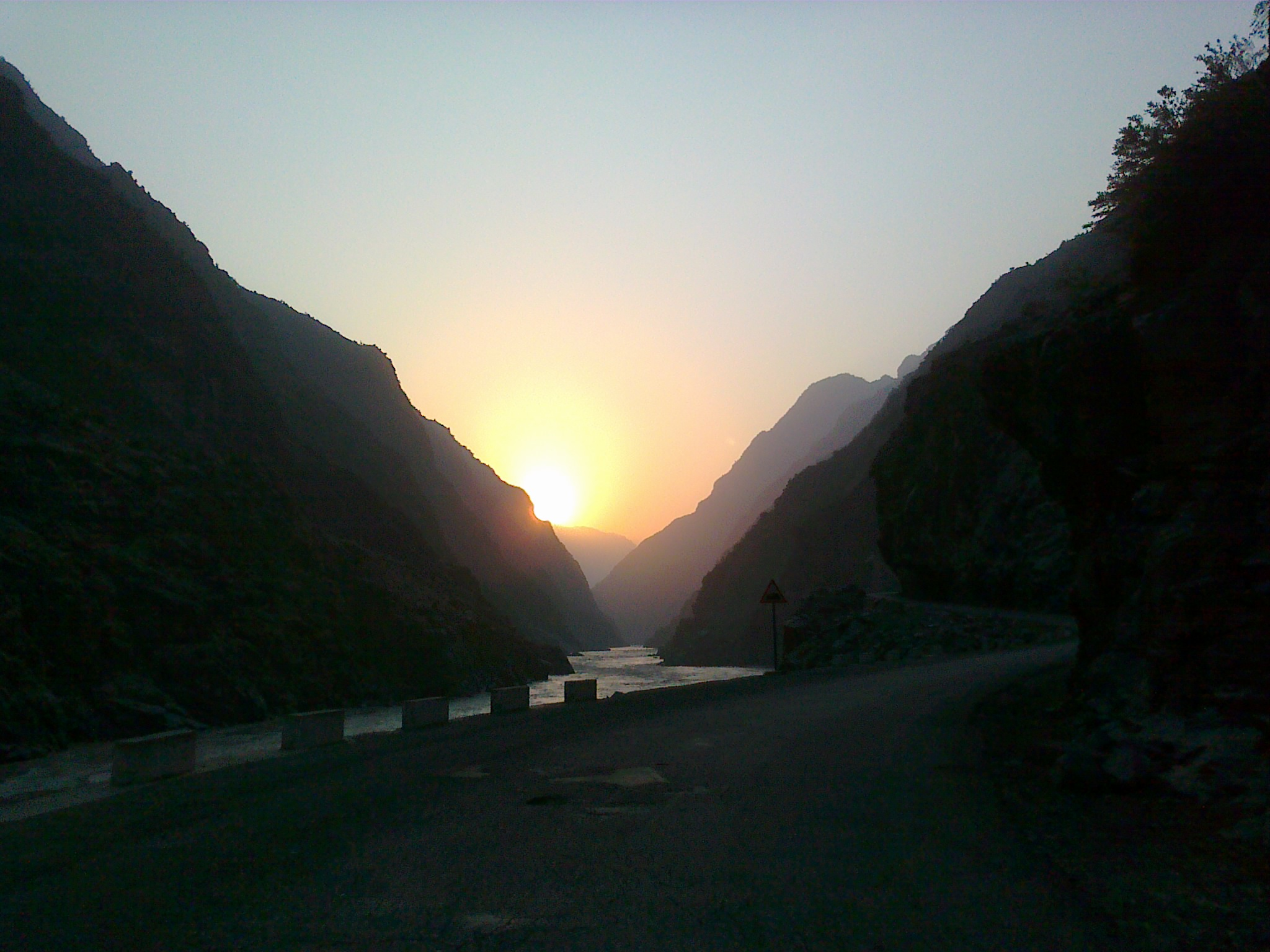
- Karakoram Highway in Upper Kohistan

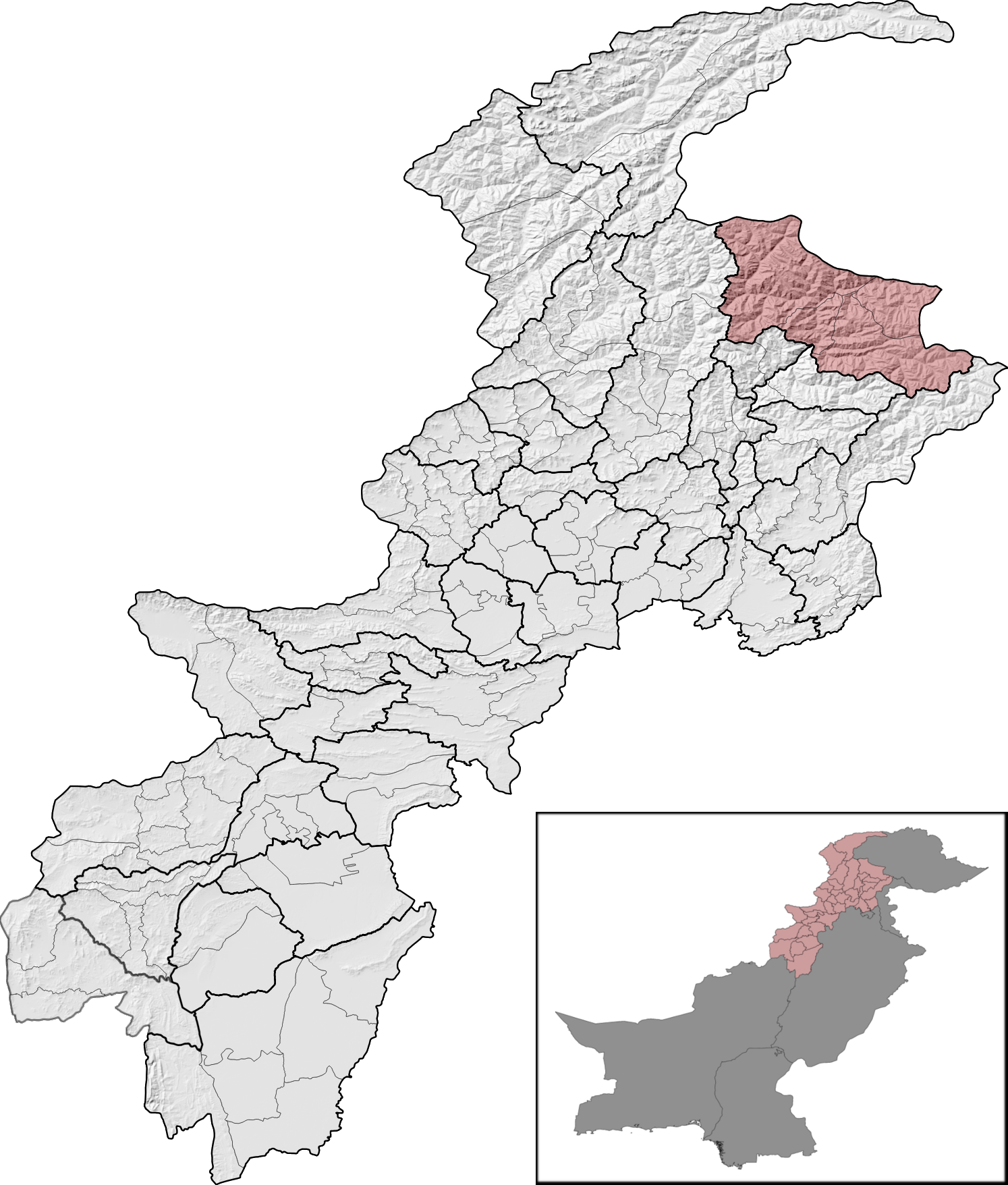
- Upper Kohistan District (red) in Khyber Pakhtunkhwa
- Country: Pakistan
- Province: Khyber Pakhtunkhwa
- Division: Hazara
- Headquarters: Dasu

Government
  - Type: District Administration
  - Deputy Commissioner: N/A
  - District Police Officer: N/A
  - NA-12 kohistan: Mohammad Edrees national assembly member

Area
  - District of Khyber Pakhtunkhwa: 5,440 km^{2} (2,100 sq mi)

Population (2023)
  - District of Khyber Pakhtunkhwa: 422,947
  - Density: 77.7/km^{2} (201/sq mi)
  - Urban: 0
  - Rural: 422,947

Literacy
  - Literacy rate: Total: (19.05%); Male: (27.46%); Female: (10.28%)
- Time zone: UTC+5 (PST)
- Number of Tehsils: 2
- Website: upperkohistan.kp.gov.pk

Upper Kohistan District (Urdu: ضلع کوہستان بالا) is a district in the Hazara Division of the Khyber Pakhtunkhwa province of Pakistan.

== History ==
Before 2014, this region was part of the larger Kohistan District. In 2014, the government bifurcated it into Upper Kohistan and Lower Kohistan districts.

== Demographics ==
=== Population ===
Historical population
Year	Pop.	±% p.a.
1951	...	—
1961	...	—
1972	121,529	—
1981	180,124	+4.47%
1998	184,746	+0.15%
2017	305,451	+2.68%
2023	422,947	+5.57%

As of the 2023 census, Upper Kohistan district has 63,712 households and a population of 422,947. The district has a sex ratio of 104.56 males to 100 females and a literacy rate of 19.05%: 27.46% for males and 10.28% for females. 159,357 (42.59% of the surveyed population) are under 10 years of age. The entire population lives in rural areas.

=== Languages ===
Languages of Upper Kohistan district (2023)
1. Kohistani, including Indus Kohistani and Kohistani Shina (87.6%)
2. Shina (11.1%)
3. Others (1.34%)

As of the 2023 census, 87.61% of the surveyed population identified their language as Kohistani and 11.05% Shina as their first language. However the designation Kohistani is applied equally to different unrelated languages in the region, including the Kohistani Shina (a Shina dialect), mainly spoken in the eastern side of the Indus River encompassing eastern Upper Kohistan, and Indus Kohistani, mainly spoken in the western side of the Indus River encompassing western Upper Kohistan. Speakers of Kohistani Shina commonly selected Kohistani as a single census option.

=== Religion ===
In the 2023 census, 775 (0.21% of the surveyed population) people in the district are from religious minorities, mainly Christians.

The literacy rate in the district is 59% and 5% for men and women respectively (2023). Source: Baseline study report, Dasu Hydropower Project.

== Administrative Units ==
In 2014, Upper Kohistan District was subdivided into two Tehsils while on 31 May 2018, the Kundai tehsil was upgraded into subdivision and two more tehsils were created. With that change, the district had one subdivision and three tehsils in total as shown below:

Tehsil	Name (Urdu)	Area (km²)	Pop. (2023)	Density (ppl/km²) (2023)	Literacy rate (2023)	Union Councils
Dassu Tehsil	(Urdu: تحصیل داسو)	1,958	148,914	76.05	15.11%	
Harban Basha Tehsil	(Urdu: تحصیل بھاشا ہربان)	...	...	...	25.49%	1
Kandia Tehsil	(Urdu: تحصیل کانڈیا)	1,926	165,232	85.79	13.71%	
Seo Tehsil	(Urdu: تحصیل سیو)	258	59,557	230.84	38.19%	1

=== Provincial Assembly ===
Member of Provincial Assembly	Party affiliation	Constituency	Year
dedar	Pakistan Tehreek-e-Insaf	PK-25 Kohistan	2018

== See also ==
- Kohistan region, Pakistan
- Lower Kohistan
- Kolai-Palas District
- Districts of Pakistan
  - Districts of Khyber Pakhtunkhwa
  - Districts of Punjab, Pakistan
  - Districts of Balochistan, Pakistan
  - Districts of Sindh, Pakistan
  - Districts of Azad Kashmir
  - Districts of Gilgit-Baltistan
- Divisions of Pakistan
  - Divisions of Balochistan
  - Divisions of Khyber Pakhtunkhwa
  - Divisions of Punjab, Pakistan
  - Divisions of Sindh
  - Divisions of Azad Kashmir
  - Divisions of Gilgit-Baltistan
