= Aka Khel =

Coordinates: 32°33′N 69°59′E

- Location within FATA Location within Pakistan
- Country: Pakistan
- Region: Federally Administered Tribal Areas
- District: Khyber Agency
- Tehsil: Landi Kotal

Population (2017)
  - Total: 73,681
- Time zone: UTC+5 (PST)

Aka Khel or Akakhel is an area of Landi Kotal Tehsil, Khyber District, Peshawar Division, Pakistan located in the Tirah Valley.

This geographic locality is entirely separate and distinct from the major Afghan Akakhel sub-tribe belonging to the Ghilji Pashtun confederation, who are natively located in Afghanistan.

== Census Information ==
As of 2017, the population in the region is 73,681.
