= Ismailzai Tehsil =

Ismailzai Tehsil تحصیل اسماعیل زئی اسماعیلزي تحصیل
- Tehsil
- Country: Pakistan
- Region: Khyber Pakhtunkhwa
- District: Orakzai District

Population (2017)
  - Total: 23,965
- Time zone: UTC+5 (PST)

Ismailzai Tehsil is a subdivision located in Orakzai District, Khyber Pakhtunkhwa, Pakistan. The population is 23,965 according to the 2017 census.

== See also ==
- List of tehsils of Khyber Pakhtunkhwa
