= Baka Khel Tehsil =

Subdivision of Khyber Pakhtunkhwa, Pakistan

Coordinates: 32°57′19″N 70°30′18″E

Baka Khel Tehsil تحصیل بکاخیل بکاخېل تحصیل
- Tehsil
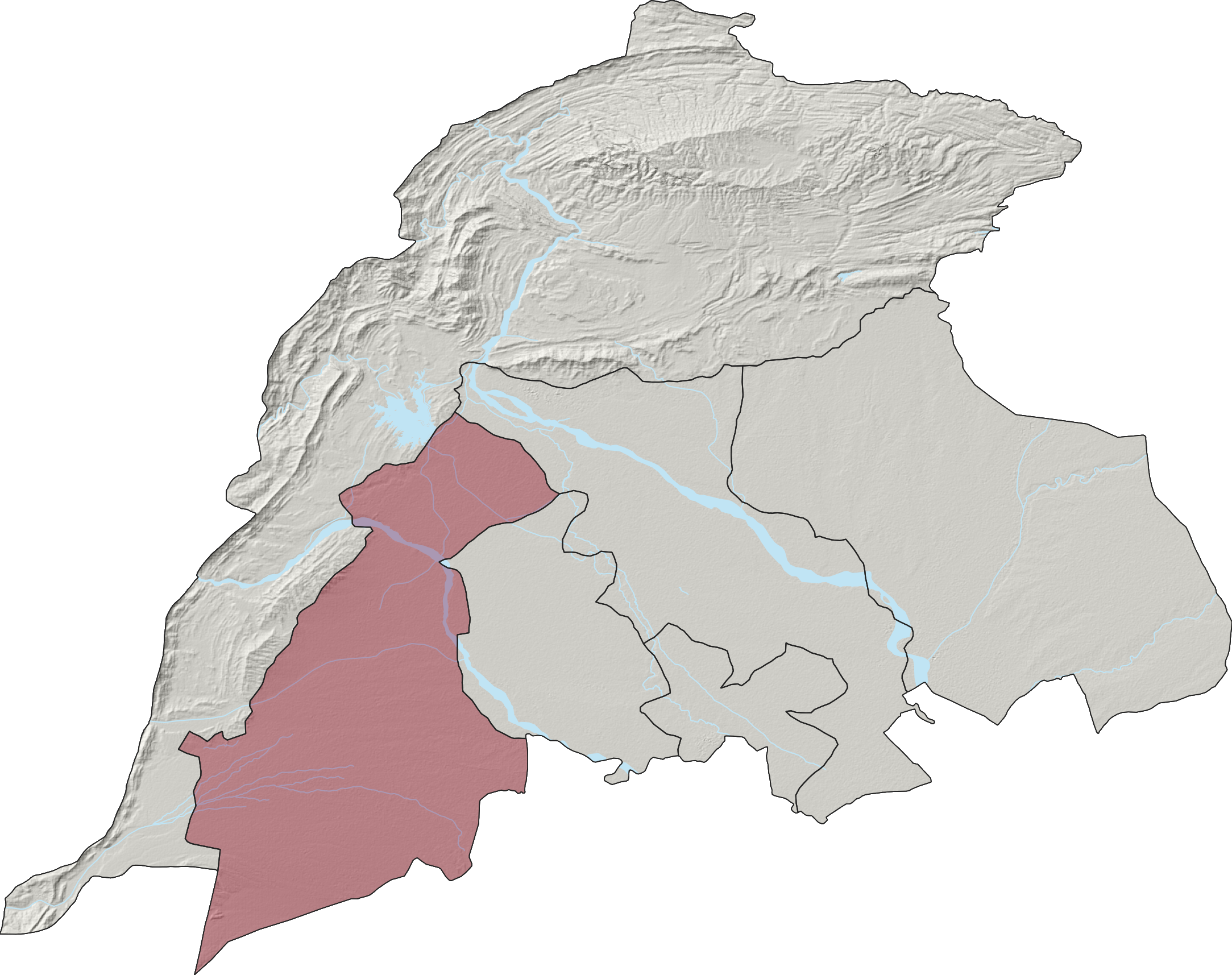
- Baka Khel Tehsil (red) in Bannu District
- Country: Pakistan
- Province: Khyber-Pakhtunkhwa
- District: Bannu District

Government
  - Chairman: Mamoor Khan Wazir (JUI(F))
- Time zone: UTC+5 (PST)
- Language(s): Pashto

Baka Khel Tehsil (Pashto: تحصیل بکاخېل) is an administrative subdivision (tehsil) of Bannu District, Bannu Division, Khyber Pakhtunkhwa Province, Pakistan.
