= Mandanr Tehsil =

- Tehsil
- Country: Pakistan
- Region: Khyber Pakhtunkhwa
- District: Buner

Population (2017)
  - Total: 152,975
- Time zone: UTC+5 (PST)
  - Summer (DST): UTC+6 (PDT)

Mandanr is a tehsil located in Buner District, Khyber Pakhtunkhwa, Pakistan. The population is 152,975 according to the 2017 census.

== See also ==
- List of tehsils of Khyber Pakhtunkhwa
- Mandanr-Yousafzai
