= Landi Kotal Tehsil =

Landi Kotal تحصیل لنڈی کوتل لنډي کوتل تحصیل
- Tehsils
- Country: Pakistan
- Region: Khyber Pakhtunkhwa
- District: Khyber District
- Seat: Landi Kotal

Government
  - Chairman: Shah Khalid (TIP)

Population (2017)
  - Tehsils: 274,409
  - Urban: 33,697
  - Rural: 240,712
- Time zone: UTC+5 (PST)

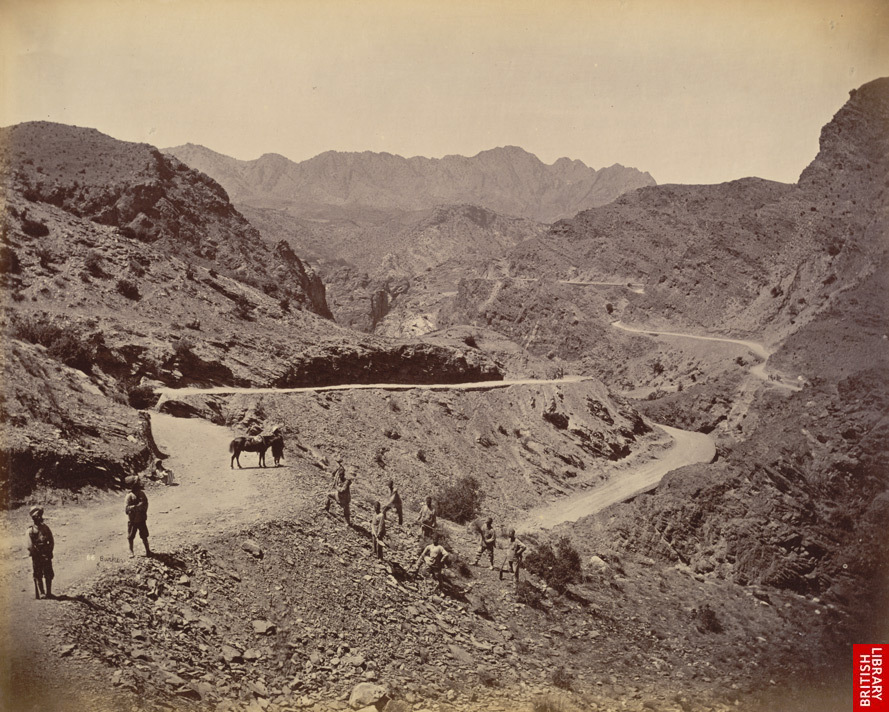
Landi Kotal Pass (1878)

Landi Tehsil is a subdivision located in Khyber District, Khyber Pakhtunkhwa, Pakistan. The population is 274,409 according to the 2017 census.

== See also ==
- Aka Khel
- Landi Kotal
- List of tehsils of Khyber Pakhtunkhwa
