= Alif Jana Khattaka =

Pashto poet and activist (1929 - 2019)

- Born: February 28, 1929 (sources vary); Ahmadi Banda, Karak
- Died: September 14, 2019
- Occupation(s): Pashto Revolutionary Poet, Activist

Alif Jana Khattaka (February 28, 1929 - September 14, 2019) was a Pashto revolutionary poet and a prominent activist of the Karwan Khudai Khidmatgar Tehreek led by Fakhre Afghan Bacha Khan.

== Early life and education ==
Born in Ahmadi Banda, Karak during British occupation, Khattaka was raised in a family actively involved in Bacha Khan's movement. Due to the prevailing circumstances, she received home education and later pursued formal education, earning a master's degree in Pashto and Urdu, as well as a Bachelor of Arts.

== Literary contributions ==
A collaborator with poet Haleem Muhammad, Khattaka contributed to the monthly magazine "Pashtun" published in Bacha Khan's office. She gained recognition as a regular writer for "Pashtun" and expressed critical views, earning praise from Bacha Khan for developing critical skills among Pashtun women.

=== Freedom Movement and Poetry ===
Khattaka dedicated her poetry to the freedom and prosperity of her people, actively participating in the Muslim freedom movement. Her verses reflect a keen awareness of the political situation, exposing British machinations and urging Pashtuns to rise against oppression.

=== Later years ===
Post-independence, Khattaka continued to advocate for Pashtun rights, especially highlighting the plight of the community in Pakistan. Despite adopting a quieter life later on, she remained committed to preserving the legacy of Bacha Khan and other freedom heroes.

== Death and legacy ==
Alif Jana Khattaka's contributions endure, with her poetry included in educational curricula, and a college named after her in Bandha Dawood Shah district of Karak. She died on September 14, 2019, due to a cerebral vascular accident.

== Personal life ==
Alif Jana Khattaka married Muhammad Zafar but the marriage faced challenges, leading to differences between the couple. She later served in various schools in Karak and Kohat, eventually retiring as a Divisional Education Officer.
