= Toi Khullah Tehsil =

Toi Khullah تحصیل توئی خلہ توي خولا تحصیل
- Tehsil
- Location of Toi Khulla Subdivision in the former Federally Administered Tribal Areas
- Country: Pakistan
- Region: Khyber Pakhtunkhwa
- District: Lower South Waziristan District

Population (2017)
  - Total: 50,593
- Time zone: UTC+5 (PST)

Toi Khullah Tehsil is a subdivision located in Lower South Waziristan District, Khyber Pakhtunkhwa, Pakistan. The population is 50,593 according to the 2017 census.

== See also ==
- List of tehsils of Khyber Pakhtunkhwa
