= Domel Tehsil =

Subdivision of Khyber Pakhtunkhwa, Pakistan

Domel Tehsil تحصیل ڈومیل ډومیل تحصیل Domail Tehsil Domel Wazir Bagh
- Tehsil
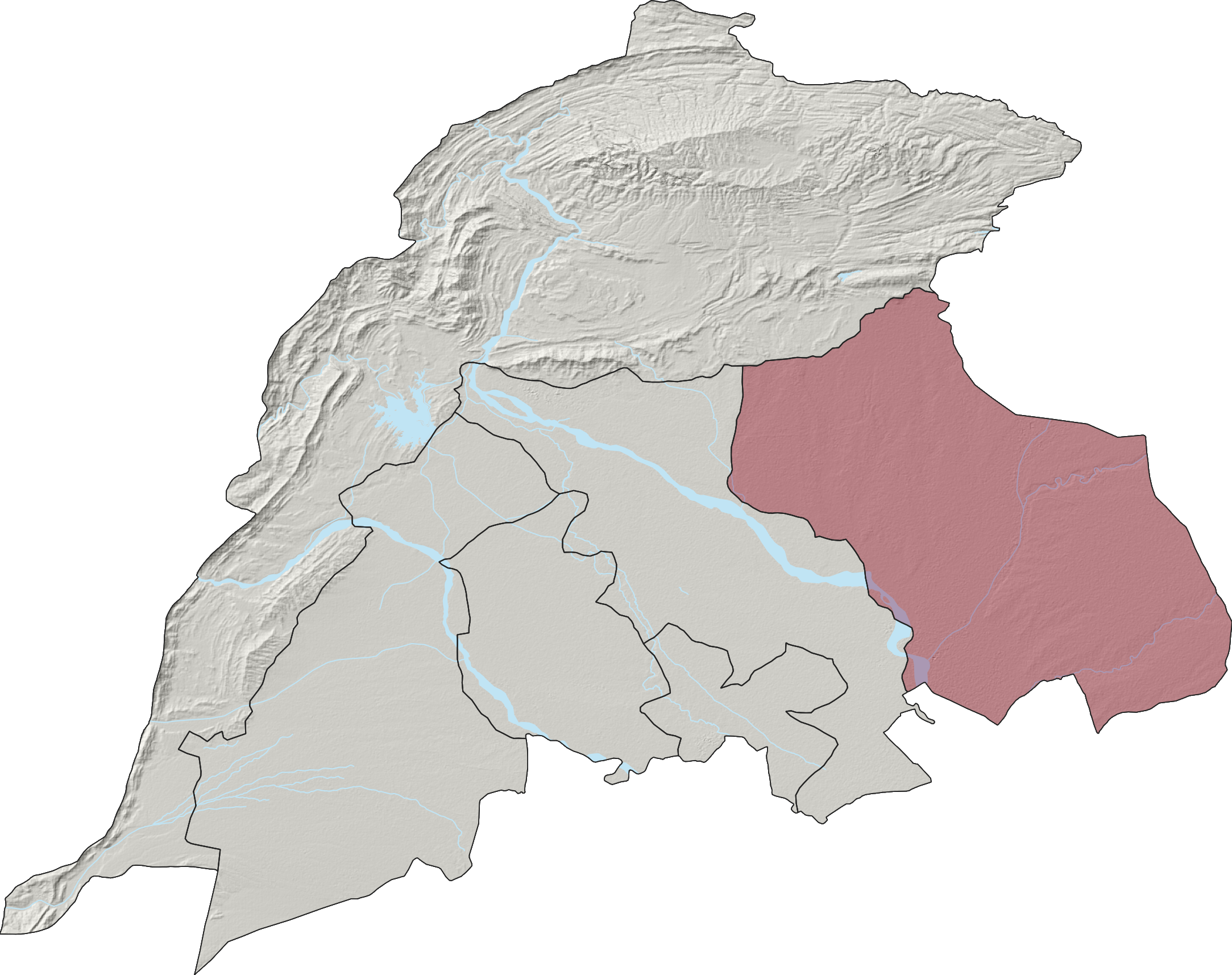
- Domel Tehsil (red) in Bannu District

- Location within Khyber Pakhtunkhwa Location within Pakistan
- Coordinates: 33°1′20″N 70°46′0″E
- Country: Pakistan
- Province: Khyber Pakhtunkhwa
- District: Bannu

Government
  - Chairman: Israr Khan (PTI)

Population (2017)
  - Total: 209,388
- Time zone: UTC+5 (PST)

Domel Tehsil (Pashto: ډومیل تحصیل, Urdu: تحصیل ڈومیل), alternatively transliterated as Domail Tehsil, is an administrative subdivision (tehsil) of Bannu District, Bannu Division, Khyber Pakhtunkhwa Province, Pakistan. It is located about 15 km from Bannu on Bannu–Kohat road.

== History ==
Domel became tehsil in 2009 after Government of Khyber Pakhtunkhwa approved upgrading it from sub tehsil. The main town in Domel tehsil is Domel. It was part of Bannu tehsil prior of it being sub tehsil.

The name Domel is said to be from DO and MEL i.e. two miles. It is said that some British people asked about the name of this place when they came here and a local person who knew no English thought that they were asking about the distance of the local police station, told the distance of the nearby Police Station to be two miles which is do mile دو میل in local language and the British called this place Domel.

Domail tehsil has reserves of both oil and gas especially in the Spintangay and Kam Chashmi area.

== Administration ==
The population of Domel Tehsil, according to the 2017 census, is 209,388 while according to the 1998 census, it was 102,710.

Domel Current Tehsildar

Umer Farooq Nawaz
