= Lower Kurram Tehsil =

Lower Kurram تحصیل کرم زیریں ښکته کرم تحصیل
- Tehsil
- Location in Pakistan Lower Kurram (Pakistan)
- Coordinates: 33°33′36″N 70°17′24″E
- Country: Pakistan
- Region: Khyber Pakhtunkhwa
- District: Kurram District

Population (2017)
  - Tehsil: 136,719
  - Urban: 34,495
  - Rural: 102,224
- Time zone: UTC+5 (PST)

Lower Kurram Tehsil is a subdivision located in Kurram District, Khyber Pakhtunkhwa, Pakistan. The population is 136,719 according to the 2017 census.

== History ==
In March 2017, two people were killed in a US drone strike in the Sara Khwa area of Lower Kurram. This was the first drone strike in Pakistan under the administration of United States President Donald Trump.

== See also ==
- Sadda, FATA
- List of tehsils of Khyber Pakhtunkhwa
