= Central Orakzai Tehsil =

Central Orakzai Tehsil تحصیل اورکزئی وسطی منځني اورکزي تحصیل
- Tehsil
- Country: Pakistan
- Region: Khyber Pakhtunkhwa
- District: Orakzai District

Population (2017)
  - Total: 59,122
- Time zone: UTC+5 (PST)

Central Orakzai Tehsil is a subdivision located in Orakzai District, Khyber Pakhtunkhwa, Pakistan. The population is 59,122 according to the 2017 census.

== See also ==
- List of tehsils of Khyber Pakhtunkhwa
