= Jamrud Tehsil =

Jamrud Tehsil تحصیل جمرود جمرود تحصیل
- Tehsil
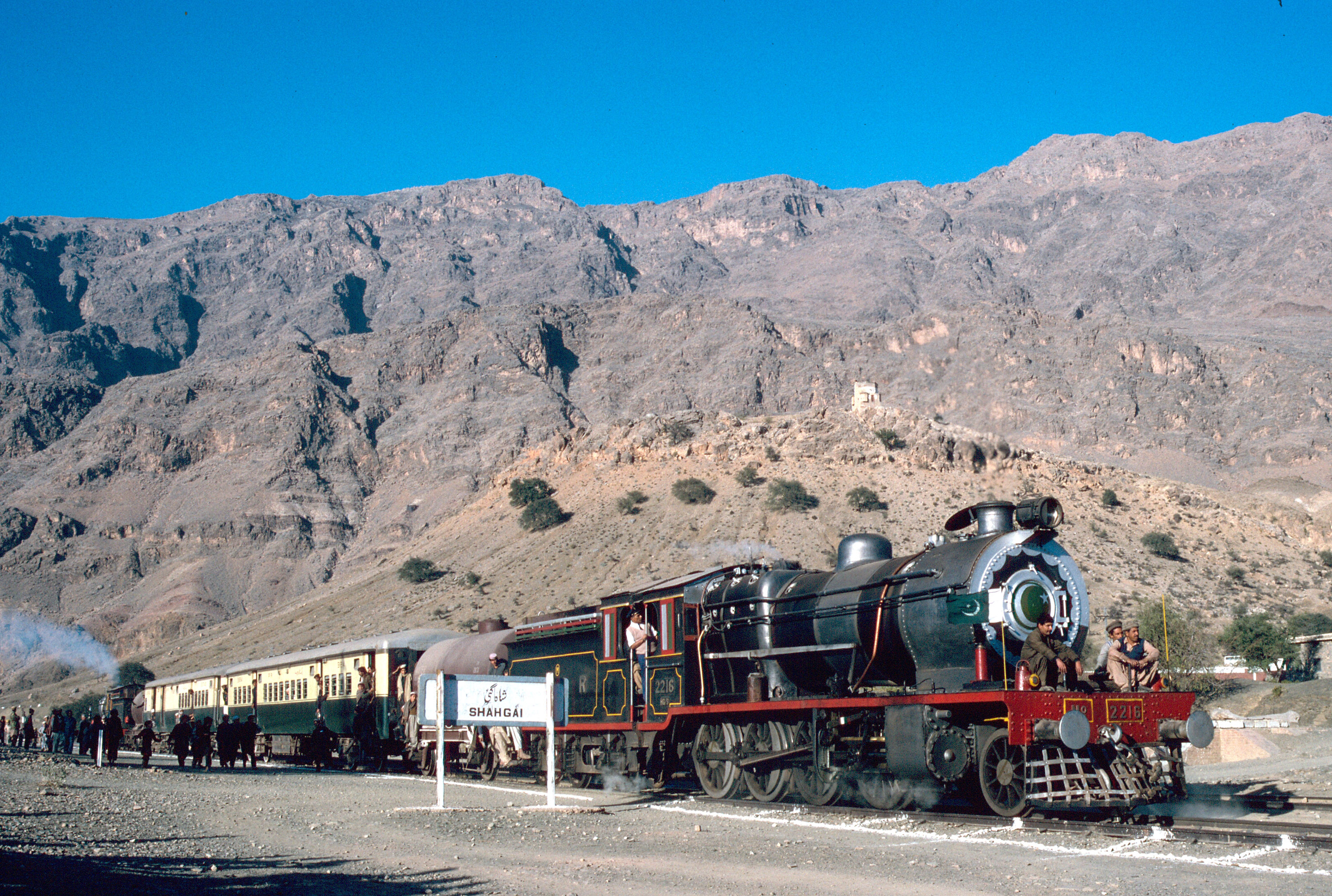
- Shahgai railway station
- Country: Pakistan
- Region: Khyber Pakhtunkhwa
- District: Khyber District

Government
  - Tehsil Chairman: Vacant
  - Member of Provincial Assembly, Khyber Pakhtunkhwa: Muhammad Sohail Afridi (PTI)

Population (2017)
  - Tehsil: 228,001
  - Urban: 63,843
  - Rural: 164,158
- Time zone: UTC+5 (PST)

Jamrud Tehsil is a subdivision located in Khyber District, Khyber Pakhtunkhwa, Pakistan. The population is 228,001 according to the 2017 census.

== See also ==
- Jamrud
- List of tehsils of Khyber Pakhtunkhwa
