= Paroa Tehsil =

Tehsil in Khyber Pakhtunkhwa, Pakistan

Paroa Tehsil: تحصیل پروآ (Urdu); پروآ تحصیل (Pashto)
- Tehsil
- Location within Khyber Pakhtunkhwa Location within Pakistan
- Coordinates: 31°33′25″N 70°45′32″E
- Country: Pakistan
- Province: Khyber Pakhtunkhwa
- Division: Dera Ismail Khan
- District: Dera Ismail Khan

Area
  - Total: 1,733 km^{2} (669 sq mi)

Population (2023)
  - Total: 320,937
  - Density: 185.2/km^{2} (479.6/sq mi)
- Time zone: UTC+5 (PKT)

Paroa Tehsil (Note: Urdu: تحصیل پروآ; Pashto: پروآ تحصیل) is a tehsil of Dera Ismail Khan District in Khyber Pakhtunkhwa, Pakistan. As of the 2023 Pakistani census, the population of Paroa Tehsil was 320,937. Agriculture is a major economic activity in the tehsil.

== History ==
Paroa Tehsil was one of the hardest hit areas during the June to October 2022 Pakistan floods, which damaged local agricultural lands.

Anti-government protesters from the Pakistan Tehreek-e-Insaf (PTI) blocked the Indus Highway at Khatm-i-Nabuwat Chowk in Paroa Tehsil on 5 November 2022. The protest was part of wider nationwide demonstrations against the attempted assassination of Imran Khan, the leader of the PTI and the former prime minister of Pakistan. At the time, Khan was being investigated by the government that replaced his for corruption.

On 1 April 2026, a shooting occurred in the village of Mangal, leaving six dead and two injured. According to local authorities, the attack was in retaliation for the theft of three motorcycles two days prior on 30 March. The injured were transported to the tehsil headquarters hospital.

A cargo truck carrying clothing caught on fire near the village of Dhora Solahn Adda on 27 April 2026, shutting down traffic both ways. Nobody was reported injured in the incident.

== Administration and geography ==
Paroa Tehsil is a tehsil (subdistrict) of Dera Ismail Khan District in the province of Khyber Pakhtunkhwa, in northwest Pakistan. It spans an area of 1,733 square kilometres.

== Demographics ==
The 2023 Pakistani census recorded a population of 320,937 people in Paroa Tehsil. The average household size was 13 people.

== Economy ==
Like most tehsils in Dera Ismail Khan District, agriculture makes up a significant part of the local economy.

== See also ==
- List of tehsils of Khyber Pakhtunkhwa
