= Wana Tehsil =

Wana تحصیل وانا واڼه تحصیل
- Tehsil
- Country: Pakistan
- Region: Khyber Pakhtunkhwa
- District: Lower South Waziristan District

Population (2017)
  - Total: 152,881
- Time zone: UTC+5 (PST)

Wana Tehsil is an administrative subdivision of Lower South Waziristan District, Khyber Pakhtunkhwa, Pakistan. The population is 152,881 according to the 2017 census.

== Notable people ==
- Ajab Gul (politician)
- Ali Wazir
- Arif Wazir

== See also ==
- Wana
- List of tehsils of Khyber Pakhtunkhwa
