= Birmil Tehsil =

Birmil تحصیل برمل برمل تحصیل
- Tehsil
- Country: Pakistan
- Region: Khyber Pakhtunkhwa
- District: Lower South Waziristan District

Area
  - Tehsil: 923 km^{2} (356 sq mi)

Population (2023)
  - Tehsil: 112,757
  - Density: 122/km^{2} (316/sq mi)
  - Urban: -
  - Rural: 112,757 (100%)

Literacy (2023)
  - Literacy rate: 23.06%
- Time zone: UTC+5 (PST)

Birmil Tehsil is a subdivision located in Lower South Waziristan District, Khyber Pakhtunkhwa, Pakistan. The population is 104,304 according to the 2017 census. The Tehsil has a diverse collection of vegetation.

== Demographics ==
=== Population ===
Historical population
Year	Pop.	±% p.a.
1951	...	—
1961	...	—
1972	...	—
1981	...	—
1998	58,512	—
2017	104,282	+3.09%
2023	112,757	+1.31%

As of the 2023 census, Birmil Tehsil had 19,759 households and a population of 112,757. The tehsil had 56,388 males and 56,368 females and a literacy rate of 23.06%: 32.86% for males and 12.99% for females. 100% population lived in rural areas.

== See also ==
- Tehsils of Pakistan
  - Tehsils of Khyber Pakhtunkhwa
- Districts of Pakistan
  - Districts of Khyber Pakhtunkhwa
- Divisions of Pakistan
  - Divisions of Khyber Pakhtunkhwa
- Barmal District
