= Gagra Tehsil =

- Tehsil
- Interactive map of Gagra Tehsil
- Country: Pakistan
- Region: Khyber Pakhtunkhwa
- District: Buner

Government
  - Chairman (In Urdu: ناظم): Syed Salar Jahan (PTI)

Population (2017)
  - Total: 270,467
- Time zone: UTC+5 (PST)
  - Summer (DST): UTC+6 (PDT)

Gagra is a tehsil located in Buner District, Khyber Pakhtunkhwa, Pakistan. The population is 270,467 according to the 2017 census.

== See also ==
- List of tehsils of Khyber Pakhtunkhwa
