= Miryan Tehsil =

Pakistani administrative area

- Tehsil
- Miryan Tehsil
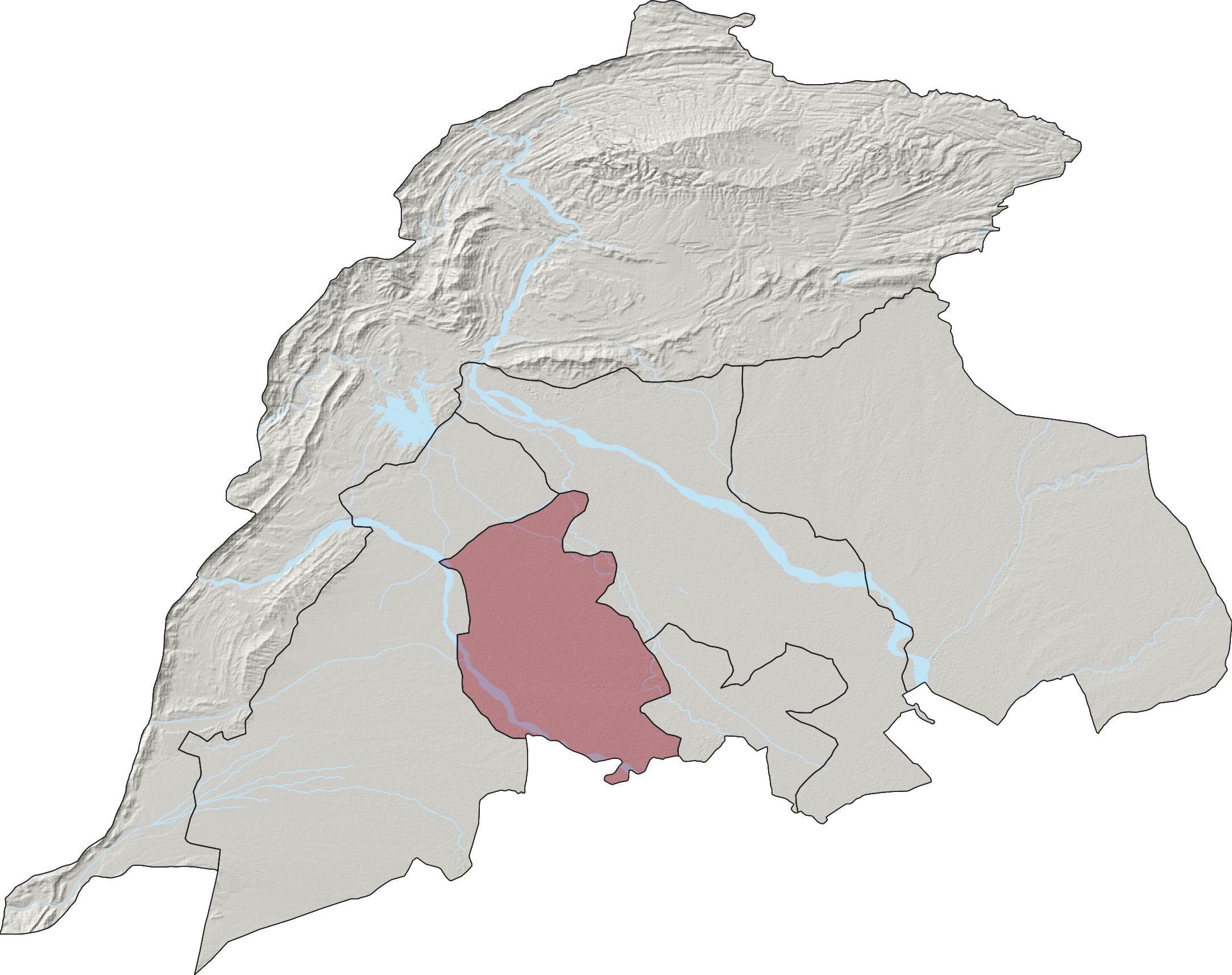
- Country: Pakistan
- Region: Khyber Pakhtunkhwa
- District: Bannu District

Government
  - Chairman: Kamal Shah

Area
  - Total: 130 km^{2} (50 sq mi)
- Time zone: UTC+5 (PST)
  - Summer (DST): UTC+6 (PDT)

Miryan Tehsil is an administrative subdivision (tehsil) of Bannu District in Bannu Division, Khyber Pakhtunkhwa, Pakistan. The population is 145,948 and it covers an area of 130km2.

Kamal Shah is the chairman of the tehsil. Shah took part in tehsil-wide protests in Bannu District following the abduction of a schoolteacher and for other local issues. The tehsil forms part of the Bannu-II and Bannu-III electoral constituencies.

== Militancy ==
The area has seen attacks by militants for a while, in 2011 a car-bomb killed 18 at Miryan police station, two years later (2013) a police van was damaged by an IED outside a Girls school. In 2024 an attack on a police station in Miryan took place, in June 2025 Federal Interior Minister Mohsin Naqvi praised the police for foiling an attack that month and in July 2025 the latest attack involved a quadcopter drone in which one woman was killed and three others were injured.
