= Tanawal Tehsil =

Pakistani administrative area

Tanawal Tehsil تحصیل تناول
- Tehsil
- Interactive map of Tanawal Tehsil
- Country: Pakistan
- Province: Khyber Pakhtunkhwa
- District: Mansehra
- Time zone: UTC+5 (PST)

Tanawal is a tehsil (an administrative subdivision) of Mansehra District, in the Khyber Pakhtunkhwa province of Pakistan. In December 2022 it was created as the sixth tehsil of Mansehra. Shergarh Fort is located in Tanawal. In May 2024 the tehsil was still awaiting government staff after the caretaker government under Anwaar ul Haq Kakar had withheld action.
