= Spinkai =

Pakistani town

Spinkai سپینکائی سپینکۍ
- Location within Khyber Pakhtunkhwa Location within Pakistan
- Coordinates: 32.3651°N 70.0905°E
- Country: Pakistan
- Province: Khyber Pakhtunkhwa
- Time zone: UTC+5 (PST)

Spinkai or Spinkai Raghzai is a town in South Waziristan District, Khyber Pakhtunkhwa, province of Pakistan. This semi-autonomous area is inhabited by Pashtun tribe Mahsud. In January 2008, Pakistan Army launched Operation Zalzala to flush out the Taliban militants belonging to Baitullah Mehsud group

On 20 May 2008, the Pakistani Army conducted collective punishment against Spinkai. The operation was called 'zalzala' which is Urdu for earthquake. At first, the Pakistan Army swept through with helicopter gunships, artillery and tanks that crunched across a parched riverbed. After four days of heavy fighting, 25 militants and six soldiers died. The rest of the militants retreated up the valley. After the capture of the village the army discovered bomb factories, detonation-ready suicide jackets and schools for teenage suicide bombers.

The Pakistan Army immediately decided to punish the village for harboring the Taliban and allowing the militants to operate in and from the village to conduct further terror attacks in Pakistan. Bulldozers and explosives experts turned Spinkai's bazaar into a mile-long pile of rubble.

== See also ==
- Mahsud
- South Waziristan
