= Sararogha Tehsil =

Sararogha
- Tehsil
- Sararogha
- Country: Pakistan
- Region: Khyber Pakhtunkhwa
- District: South Waziristan
- Capital: Sararogha Tahsi

Population (2017)
  - Total: 98,389
- Time zone: UTC+5 (PST)

Sararogha Tehsil is a subdivision located in South Waziristan District, Khyber Pakhtunkhwa, Pakistan. The population is 98,389 according to the 2017 census.

== See also ==
- List of tehsils of Khyber Pakhtunkhwa
