= Wana, Pakistan =

Pakistani town

Wanna: واڼه; وانا; Wana
- Location within Khyber Pakhtunkhwa Location within Pakistan
- Coordinates: 32°18′18″N 69°35′20″E
- Country: Pakistan
- Province: Khyber Pakhtunkhwa
- District: South Waziristan
- Tehsil: Wana
- Elevation: 1,387 m (4,551 ft)
- Time zone: UTC+5 (PST)

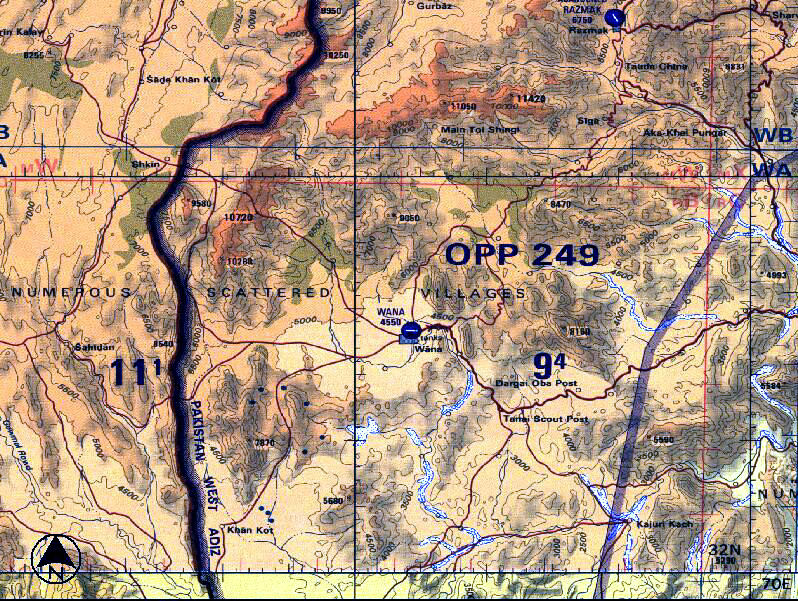
Tactical Pilotage Chart showing Wanna

Wāṇa or Wanna (Pashto: واڼه, romanized: wāṇa [ˈwɑɳə]; Urdu: وانا, lit. 'vānā' [ˈʋɑːnɑː]) is the largest town in the South Waziristan District of the Khyber Pakhtunkhwa province of Pakistan. Wana had been the summer headquarters for the administration of South Waziristan Agency, while the city of Tank located in the neighbouring Tank District had been the winter headquarters of the agency.

The town of Wana is also the headquarters of Wana Tehsil which is one of the three subdivisions of South Waziristan along with Ladha and Sarwakai.

== History ==
=== Colonial history ===
During the British Empire, beginning in the late 19th century, the British established a cantonment on the Wanna Plain which was used as a headquarters by the British forces in South Waziristan till the partition of India in 1947. During their rule, the Pashtun tribes of Waziristan - part of the Karlanri Tribal Confederation - gave the British much headache. In fact, the British, known then as the 'foreigners', had to deal with a full-fledged insurgency in Waziristan in the 1930s. At one point during the 1930s, the British had up to 18,000 troops in and around Waziristan, with Wanna being used as the forward headquarters and airbase.

=== Post-Independence ===
During 1989, the city underwent a striking increase in Malaria with a village Azam Warsak suffering the most.

=== Wanna in the war on terror ===
Wanna has been involved in the war on terror due to the Al-Qaeda members affiliated with the Taliban-aligned Ahmadzai Waziris of the Wanna Plain. The Pakistan Armed forces have conducted several armed operations against these Al-Qaeda members since August 2003 off and on with limited success. Perhaps the town's most violent incident in the war on terror was the Battle of Wanna which took place in March 2004 and included fighters from the Pakistani Army against Al-Qaeda and Taliban forces. More than 100 armed personnel were killed during the week of the fighting.

== Ethnic background of inhabitants ==
Inhabitants of Wanna are Muslim Pashtuns, primarily Ahmedzai Waziris from the Wazir tribe but other Pashtun tribes such as Mahsud and Bettani also live in the surroundings of Wanna.
