= Tiarza Tehsil =

Tiarza Tehsil تحصیل تیارزه تیارزه تحصیل
- Tehsil
- Location of Tiarza Subdivision in the former Federally Administered Tribal Areas
- Country: Pakistan
- Region: Khyber Pakhtunkhwa
- District: South Waziristan
- Seat: Kaniguram

Population (2017)
  - Total: 45,210
- Time zone: UTC+5 (PST)

Tiarza Tehsil is a subdivision located in South Waziristan District, Khyber Pakhtunkhwa, Pakistan. The population is 45,210 according to the 2017 census.

== Notable people ==
- Jamal Malyar
- Noor Wali Mehsud

== See also ==
- Kaniguram
- List of tehsils of Khyber Pakhtunkhwa
