= Serwekai Tehsil =

Serwekai Tehsil تحصیل سرویکائی سروکۍ تحصیل
- Tehsil
- Location within Khyber Pakhtunkhwa Location in Pakistan
- Coordinates: 32°15′32.21″N 69°53′0.83″E
- Country: Pakistan
- Region: Khyber Pakhtunkhwa
- District: South Waziristan
- Seat: Serwekai

Government
  - Chairman: Shah Faisal (IND)

Population (2017)
  - Total: 54,278
- Time zone: UTC+5 (PST)

Serwekai Tehsil is a subdivision located in South Waziristan District, Khyber Pakhtunkhwa, Pakistan. The population is 54,278 according to the 2017 census.

== Notable people ==
- Manzoor Pashteen

== See also ==
- Serwekai
- List of tehsils of Khyber Pakhtunkhwa
