= Chagharzai, Buner =

Chagharzai Tehsil تحصیل چغرزئی چغرزي تحصیل
- Tehsil
- Country: Pakistan
- Province: Khyber Pakhtunkhwa
- District: Buner

Government
  - Type: Tehsil-council
  - Chairman: Shareef Khan (PTI)
- Time zone: UTC+5 (PST)

Chagharzai is an administrative unit, known as Tehsil of Buner District in the Khyber Pakhtunkhwa province of Pakistan. According to the 2023 census the population Chagharzai was 125919 of whom 62886 were male and 63029 were female.

Chagharzai is one of the six Tehsils (subdistricts) of Buner District.

== See also ==
- Buner District
