= List of districts in Khyber Pakhtunkhwa =

Administrative divisions in Pakistan

Districts of Khyber Pakhtunkhwa
- Location: Khyber Pakhtunkhwa, Pakistan
- Number: 40 (as of Oct 2025)
- Populations: 169,240 (Upper Chitral District) – 4,333,770 (Peshawar District)
- Areas: 454 square kilometres (175 sq mi) (Torghar District) – 9,334 square kilometres (3,604 sq mi) (Dera Ismail Khan District)
- Government: District Government; City District Government; Zilla Council
- Subdivisions: Tehsils

The province of Khyber Pakhtunkhwa, the third-largest province of Pakistan by population and the smallest province by area, is divided into 40 districts and seven divisions.

Below, you will find a detailed overview of the history of Khyber Pakhtunkhwa's districts and divisions, a map showing each district, the divisions of Khyber Pakhtunkhwa and their districts, and a list showing each district's name, the division the district belongs to, the district's area, the location of the district's headquarters, the district's population and population density (in 2017), the average annual population growth rate of each district (between 1998 and 2017), and a map showing each district's location.

== History ==
=== 1901 to 2010 ===
Districts have formed an integral part of civil administration in the subcontinent since colonial times. When the North-West Frontier Province (the former name of Khyber Pakhtunkhwa) formed in November 1901, it was divided into five "settled districts": Bannu, Dera Ismail Khan, Hazara, Kohat, and Peshawar, and a "trans-border tract" of land which encompassed five "Political Agencies": Khyber, Kurram, Malakand, Tochi, and Wano. The four districts Bannu, Dera Ismail Khan, Kohat, and Peshawar were considered "Trans-Indus" districts.

By the time of the 1941 census of British India, Tochi Agency had been renamed "North Waziristan Agency", Wana Agency had been renamed "South Waziristan Agency", and two tehsils of Peshawar District (Mardan and Swabi) were split off to form Mardan District, which became the fifth "Trans-Indus" district. The six districts of the North-West Frontier Province had also all been given their own "Frontier Regions", which were tribal areas that were under the control of the deputy commissioner of an adjacent district.

=== 1947 to 1954 ===
Upon the independence of Pakistan, the six districts of the North-West Frontier Province retained their borders and status within the province, but the five tribal agencies and six frontier regions all split off from the province, creating the Federally Administered Tribal Areas. The Federally Administered Tribal Areas was an administrative unit of Pakistan governed from Islamabad which had an area larger than the province itself.

In 1951, parts of Malakand Agency were split off to create the Mohmand Agency in the Federally Administered Tribal Areas.

=== 1954 to 1972 ===
In 1954, the One Unit policy that consolidated all of West Pakistan into one province began. From 1954 to 1970, the North-West Frontier Province ceased to exist. The death of the province brought the rise of the area's first divisions (divisions had already existed in Punjab and East Bengal, but none of the other provinces had any divisions until One Unit). The area that once covered the North-West Frontier Province and Federally Administered Tribal Areas was split among two divisions: Dera Ismail Khan Division and Peshawar Division. Dera Ismail Khan Division covered Bannu District, Dera Ismail Khan District, North Waziristan Agency, and South Waziristan Agency, and Peshawar Division covered Hazara District, Kohat District, Mardan District, Peshawar District, Kurram Agency, Khyber Agency, Malakand Agency, and Mohmand Agency. The frontier regions which had previously existed were absorbed into their respective districts at this time.

The One Unit policy ended in 1970 and the provinces returned with their original forms (which also meant that the Federally Administered Tribal Areas and the North-West Frontier Province were separate once more, and that the Frontier Regions regained their status as administrative units). The divisions that had been created as a result of the policy stayed in the North-West Frontier Province, but were abolished entirely in the Federally Administered Tribal Areas.

By the time of the 1972 Census of Pakistan, many changes had been made to the administrative map:

- Malakand Division had been created between 1961 and 1972 using the area that covered most of the now-defunct Malakand Agency, and was split up into the districts of Chitral, Dir, Malakand, Shangla and Swat;
- The districts of Hazara and Mardan had absorbed their frontier regions;
- The Bajaur Agency was created out of the areas of the now-defunct Malakand Agency that were not placed in Malakand Division.

This meant that at the North-West Frontier Province was divided into three divisions and ten districts, while the Federally Administered Tribal Areas were divided into six Political Agencies and four Frontier Regions. The administrative divisions of the region were as follows (districts and divisions which do not exist anymore are in italic):

Districts of Khyber Pakhtunkhwa (1954–1972)
Province/territory	Divisions	Districts
North-West Frontier Province	Dera Ismail Khan Division	Bannu District; Dera Ismail Khan District
North-West Frontier Province	Malakand Division	Chitral District; Dir District; Malakand District; Swat District
North-West Frontier Province	Peshawar Division	Hazara District; Kohat District; Mardan District; Peshawar District
Federally Administered Tribal Areas	Political Agencies	Bajaur Agency; Khyber Agency; Kurram Agency; Mohmand Agency; North Waziristan Agency; South Waziristan Agency
Federally Administered Tribal Areas	Frontier Regions	Frontier Region Bannu; Frontier Region Dera Ismail Khan; Frontier Region Kohat; Frontier Region Peshawar

=== 1972 to 1981 ===
Throughout the years between 1972 and 1981, new divisions and districts kept on being divided and created and changes kept on being made to the administrative map:

Hazara Division was created out of the area that covered the now-defunct Hazara District and parts of Swat District, in Malakand Division. Hazara Division was split up into three districts, which were Abbottabad District (formed out of Abbottabad, Amb, and Haripur Tehsils of Hazara District), Kohistan District (formed out of six tehsils of Swat District and eight union councils of Batagram Tehsil (in Hazara District), and Mansehra District (formed out of Batagram Tehsil (exc. eight union councils which were given to Kohistan District) and Mansehra Tehsil in Hazara District).

The agency of Orakzai was created out of parts of the Frontier Region Kohat (which still existed, but was smaller) in the Federally Administered Tribal Areas.

This meant that by the time of the 1981 Census of Pakistan, the North-West Frontier Province had 12 districts (two more than in 1972) organized into four divisions (one more than in 1972) and the Federally Administered Tribal Areas had seven Political Agencies (one more than in 1972) and four Frontier Regions. You can find a list of them below (districts and divisions which do not exist anymore are in italic):

Districts of Khyber Pakhtunkhwa (1972–1981)
Province/territory	Divisions	Districts
North-West Frontier Province	Dera Ismail Khan Division	Bannu District; Dera Ismail Khan District
North-West Frontier Province	Hazara Division	Abbottabad District; Kohistan District; Mansehra District
North-West Frontier Province	Malakand Division	Chitral District; Dir District; Malakand District; Swat District
North-West Frontier Province	Peshawar Division	Kohat District; Mardan District; Peshawar District
Federally Administered Tribal Areas	Political Agencies	Bajaur Agency; Khyber Agency; Kurram Agency; Mohmand Agency; Orakzai Agency; North Waziristan Agency; South Waziristan Agency
Federally Administered Tribal Areas	Frontier Regions	Frontier Region Bannu; Frontier Region Dera Ismail Khan; Frontier Region Kohat; Frontier Region Peshawar

=== 1981 to 1998 ===
Between the 1981 and 1998 censuses of Pakistan, many changes to the administrative map of the North-West Frontier Province:

Dir District was split up into Lower Dir District (formed out of the sub-divisions of Dir and Wari) and Upper Dir District (formed out of the sub-divisions of Timergara and Jandool); the sub-divisions of Daggar/Buner and Alpuri were split off of Swat District to form the districts of Buner and Shangla respectively;

Batagram Tehsil was separated from Mansehra District to form the new Batagram District and many union councils which were once part of Abbottabad District (most of which were part of Amb Tehsil before 1981) were absorbed into Mansehra District; what was left of Abbottabad District was divided into Haripur District (formed of Haripur Tehsil and portions of Abbottabad Tehsil) and Abbottabad District (formed of Abbottabad Tehsil excluding the portions taken by Haripur District);

Mardan Division was formed out of Mardan District (formerly in Peshawar Division) and was split into the districts of Mardan (covering the area of Mardan Tehsil, part of Mardan District) and Swabi (covering the area of Swabi Tehsil, part of Mardan District);

Kohat Division was formed out of Kohat District (formerly in Peshawar Division) and was split into the districts of Karak (covering the areas of Karak Tehsil and parts of Hangu and Kohat Tehsils, all of which were formerly part of Kohat District), Kohat (covering the areas of Kohat Tehsil, minus the parts of the tehsil that were absorbed into Karak District), and Hangu (covering the areas of Hangu Tehsil minus the parts of the tehsil that were absorbed into Karak District);

Peshawar District was split into three districts, Charsadda (upgraded from Charsadda Tehsil), Nowshera (made from most of the area of Nowshera Tehsil), and Peshawar (made from Peshawar Tehsil and parts of the area of Nowshera Tehsil);

Bannu Division was formed out of Bannu District (formerly in Dera Ismail Khan Division), and was split into the districts of Bannu (covering most of the areas of Bannu Tehsil) and Lakki Marwat (covering the area of Lakki Marwat Tehsil, along with parts of Bannu Tehsil);

Dera Ismail Khan District was bifurcated into Dera Ismail Khan District (created from Dera Ismail Khan Tehsil) and Tank District (created from Tank Tehsil).

As for the Federally Administered Tribal Areas, the agencies remained the same and retained the exact same borders they had in 1981, but two more frontier regions were created: Frontier Region Lakki Marwat and Frontier Region Tank. These two frontier regions were created from parts of Frontier Region Dera Ismail Khan, which was, in 1981, split up into two non-contiguous sections. The northern section was divided into Frontier Region Lakki Marwat and Frontier Region Tank upon the creation of Lakki Marwat and Tank Districts, but Frontier Region Dera Ismail Khan retained the southern section.

This meant that by the time of the 1998 Census of Pakistan, the North-West Frontier Province had 24 districts (twelve more than in 1981) organized into seven divisions (three more than in 1981) and the Federally Administered Tribal Areas had seven Political Agencies and six Frontier Regions (two more than in 1981). You can find a list of them below (districts and divisions which do not exist anymore are in italic):

Districts of Khyber Pakhtunkhwa (1981–1998)
Province/territory	Divisions	Districts
North-West Frontier Province	Bannu Division	Bannu District; Lakki Marwat District
North-West Frontier Province	Dera Ismail Khan Division	Dera Ismail Khan District; Tank District
North-West Frontier Province	Hazara Division	Abbottabad District; Battagram District; Haripur District; Kohistan District; Mansehra District
North-West Frontier Province	Kohat Division	Hangu District; Karak District; Kohat District
North-West Frontier Province	Malakand Division	Buner District; Chitral District; Lower Dir District; Malakand District; Shangla District; Swat District; Upper Dir District
North-West Frontier Province	Mardan Division	Mardan District; Swabi District
North-West Frontier Province	Peshawar Division	Charsadda District; Nowshera District; Peshawar District
Federally Administered Tribal Areas	Political Agencies	Bajaur Agency; Khyber Agency; Kurram Agency; Mohmand Agency; Orakzai Agency; North Waziristan Agency; South Waziristan Agency
Federally Administered Tribal Areas	Frontier Regions	Frontier Region Bannu; Frontier Region Dera Ismail Khan; Frontier Region Kohat; Frontier Region Lakki Marwat; Frontier Region Peshawar; Frontier Region Tank

=== 1998 to 2017 ===
In August 2000, all of the divisions throughout Pakistan were abolished, but were reinstated in their exact previous forms eight years later after the elections of 2008.

On the other hand, no changes occurred to the 1998 district setup for over a decade, until 2010, when the North-West Frontier Province was renamed Khyber Pakhtunkhwa. One year later, in 2011, Kala Dhaka Tehsil was separated from Mansehra District to become Torghar District, the 25th district of Khyber Pakhtunkhwa. These 25 districts (the 24 districts dating to 1998 and Torghar) were the only districts recorded as a part of Khyber Pakhtunkhwa during the 2017 Census.

This meant that by the time of the 2017 Census of Pakistan, Khyber Pakhtunkhwa had 25 districts (one more than in 1998) organized into seven divisions and the Federally Administered Tribal Areas had seven Political Agencies and six Frontier Regions. You can find a list of them below (districts and divisions which do not exist anymore are in italic):

Districts of Khyber Pakhtunkhwa (1998–2017)
Province/territory	Divisions	Districts
North-West Frontier Province (renamed to Khyber Pakhtunkhwa in 2010)	Bannu Division	Bannu District; Lakki Marwat District
North-West Frontier Province (renamed to Khyber Pakhtunkhwa in 2010)	Dera Ismail Khan Division	Dera Ismail Khan District; Tank District
North-West Frontier Province (renamed to Khyber Pakhtunkhwa in 2010)	Hazara Division	Abbottabad District; Battagram District; Haripur District; Kohistan District; Mansehra District; Torghar District
North-West Frontier Province (renamed to Khyber Pakhtunkhwa in 2010)	Kohat Division	Hangu District; Karak District; Kohat District
North-West Frontier Province (renamed to Khyber Pakhtunkhwa in 2010)	Malakand Division	Buner District; Chitral District; Lower Dir District; Malakand District; Shangla District; Swat District; Upper Dir District
North-West Frontier Province (renamed to Khyber Pakhtunkhwa in 2010)	Mardan Division	Mardan District; Swabi District
North-West Frontier Province (renamed to Khyber Pakhtunkhwa in 2010)	Peshawar Division	Charsadda District; Nowshera District; Peshawar District
Federally Administered Tribal Areas	Political Agencies	Bajaur Agency; Khyber Agency; Kurram Agency; Mohmand Agency; Orakzai Agency; North Waziristan Agency; South Waziristan Agency
Federally Administered Tribal Areas	Frontier Regions	Frontier Region Bannu; Frontier Region Dera Ismail Khan; Frontier Region Kohat; Frontier Region Lakki Marwat; Frontier Region Peshawar; Frontier Region Tank

=== 2017 to present ===
In 2014, Kohistan District was bifurcated into Upper Kohistan District and Lower Kohistan District, but tensions on the bifurcation did not resolve until late 2017 (after the 2017 census), when Kolai-Palas District was formed as well. This meant that Kohistan District was still legally one administrative unit until after the time of the 2017 census (the bifurcation was delayed in light of the political tensions, and did not go through until late 2017, when Kohistan district was split into three districts).

On 31 May 2018, the Twenty-fifth Amendment to the Constitution of Pakistan was put into force. This amendment merged the Federally Administered Tribal Areas with the province of Khyber Pakhtunkhwa and changes the province's borders and layout drastically. Each of the seven agencies in the Federally Administered Tribal Areas (Bajaur, Kurram, Khyber, Mohmand, North Waziristan, Orakzai, and South Waziristan) was made into its own district and added into an adjacent division (Bajaur District became a part of Malakand Division, Khyber and Mohmand Districts joined Peshawar Division, Kurram and Orakzai Districts joined Kohat Division, North Waziristan District joined Bannu Division, and South Waziristan District joined Dera Ismail Khan Division). The six Frontier Regions joined the districts they were adjacent to (Frontier Region Bannu was incorporated into Bannu District, Frontier Region Kohat was incorporated into Kohat District etc.).

In late 2018, Chitral District, formerly the largest district in the province by area, was bifurcated into Upper Chitral District, from Mastuj Tehsil, and Lower Chitral District, from Chitral Tehsil. In 2022, South Waziristan district was bifurcated into Upper South Waziristan headquarter Spinkai Karzai and Lower South Waziristan headquarter Wana. In January 2023, Alai was given full district status from the tehsil of Battagram.

In January 2023, Allai was elevated to full district status from the Allai Tehsil of Battagram. In October 2025, the KP government divided the Swat district into Upper Swat District and at the same time created Paharpur District from part of Dera Ismail Khan.

== Proposed districts ==
Additional demands for new districts
From time to time, several chief ministers and elected representatives, such as MLAs and MPs, have proposed the following new districts

Proposed District	Proposed Headquarters	Current District	Division
Bala Kot district	Balakot	Mansehra district	Hazara division
Oghi district	Oghi	Mansehra district	Hazara division
Jandool district	Samarbagh	Lower Dir district	Malakand division
Kulachi district	Kulachi	Dera Ismail Khan district	Dera Ismail Khan division

== List of the Districts by area, population, density, literacy rate etc. ==
Below you will find a list of all 38 districts in the province of Khyber Pakhtunkhwa, along with the division it belongs to, the area of the district, the population and population density of the district, the average annual population growth rate of each district (between 1998 and 2017), and a map showing its location. The districts are initially listed in alphabetical order, but they can be sorted in different ways by clicking the headers of the table.

District	Headquarter	Area (km^{2})	Pop. (2023)	Density (ppl/km^{2})	Lit. Rate (2023)	Average Annual Pop. Growth Rate (1998 - 2017)	Map	Division
Abbottabad	Abbottabad	1,967	1,419,072	721.6	77.34%	2.20% ▲		Hazara
Allai	Allai Valley	804	218,149	271.33	25.71%	2.10%		Hazara
Battagram	Battagram	497	335,984	676.02	31.20%	2.12%		Hazara
Haripur	Haripur	1,725	1,174,783	681.3	74.88%	1.97% ▲		Hazara
Kolai Palas	Kolai	1,410	280,162	198.7	18.80%	2.71% ▲		Hazara
Torghar	Judba	454	200,445	441.6	29.74%	2.64% ▲		Hazara
Upper Kohistan	Dasu	5,440	422,947	77.8	19.05%	2.69% ▲		Hazara
Lower Kohistan	Pattan	642	340,017	529.5	22.05%	2.70% ▲		Hazara
Mansehra	Mansehra	4,125	1,797,177	435.6	63.79%	2.47% ▲		Hazara
Hangu	Hangu	1,097	528,902	482.3	43.15%	2.66% ▲		Kohat
Karak	Karak	3,372	815,878	241.9	65.36%	2.63% ▲		Kohat
Kohat	Kohat	2,991	1,234,661	412.9	58.55%	2.85% ▲		Kohat
Kurram	Parachinar	3,380	785,434	232.4	35.22%	1.71% ▲		Kohat
Orakzai	Kalaya	1,538	387,561	252.0	33.57%	0.64% ▲		Kohat
Bannu	Bannu	1,972	1,357,890	688.6	41.75%	2.96% ▲		Bannu
Lakki Marwat	Lakki Marwat	3,296	1,040,856	315.8	48.47%	3.18% ▲		Bannu
North Waziristan	Miranshah	4,707	693,332	147.3	32.82%	2.17% ▲		Bannu
Khyber	Landi Kotal	2,576	1,146,267	445.0	38.45%	3.15% ▲		Peshawar
Mohmand	Ghalanai	2,296	553,933	241.2	31.28%	1.77% ▲		Peshawar
Nowshera	Nowshera	1,748	1,740,705	995.8	56.78%	2.94% ▲		Peshawar
Peshawar	Peshawar	1,518	4,758,762	3,135.6	53.28%	3.93% ▲		Peshawar
Charsadda	Charsadda	996	1,835,504	1,843.1	53.94%	2.43% ▲		Peshawar
Dera Ismail Khan	Dera Ismail Khan	7,677	1,423,344	185.4	35.67%	1.30% ▲		Dera Ismail Khan
Upper South Waziristan	Spinkai	2,815	367,364	130.5	38.27%	...		Dera Ismail Khan
Lower South Waziristan	Wana	3,805	307,851	80.9	20.96%	...		Dera Ismail Khan
Tank	Tank	2,900	470,293	162.2	40.67%	2.54% ▲		Dera Ismail Khan
Paharpur	Paharpur	1,657	406,467	245.3	48.86%			Dera Ismail Khan
Mardan	Mardan	1,632	2,744,898	1,681.4	55.79%	2.58% ▲		Mardan
Swabi	Swabi	1,543	1,894,600	1,228.0	58.48%	2.44% ▲		Mardan
Upper Chitral	Booni	8,392	195,528	23.3	73.83%	1.24% ▲		Malakand
Upper Dir	Dir	2,216	488,339	220.3	46.77%	2.64% ▲		Malakand
Lower Chitral	Chitral	6,458	320,407	49.6	66.10%	2.17% ▲		Malakand
Lower Dir	Timergara	1,583	1,650,183	1,042.4	57.36%	3.71% ▲		Malakand
Malakand	Batkhela	952	826,250	868.1	...	2.47% ▲		Malakand
Shangla	Alpuri	1,586	891,252	562.0	33.74%	2.96% ▲		Malakand
Swat	Saidu Sharif	1,362	1,557,030	1143.1	58.13%	3.24% ▲		Malakand
Upper Swat	Matta	3,975	1,130,354	284.3	41.47%	2.56%		Malakand
Bajaur	Khar	1,290	1,287,960	998.4	26.26%	3.25% ▲		Malakand
Buner	Daggar	1,865	1,016,869	545.1	43.75%	3.05% ▲		Malakand
Central Dir District	Wari	1,483	595,227	401.4	48.26%	...		Malakand

== List of districts by population over the years ==
District	Headquarter	Pop. (2023)	Pop. (2017)	Pop. (1998)	Pop. (1981)	Pop. (1971)	Pop. (1961)	Pop. (1951)	Division
Abbottabad	Abbottabad	1,419,072	1,332,912	880,666	647,635	524,826	354,452	318,775	Hazara
Allai	Allai Valley	218,149	180,414	121,652	134,955	56,100	21,963	...	Hazara
Battagram	Battagram	335,984	296,198	307,278	339,119	174,009	94,357	...	Hazara
Haripur	Haripur	1,174,783	1,003,031	692,228	479,031	417,561	273,507	252,168	Hazara
Kolai Palas	Kolai	280,162	275,461	165,613	123,685	...	...	...	Hazara
Torghar	Judba	200,445	171,395	174,682	83,927	195,580	151,718	142,599	Hazara
Upper Kohistan	Dasu	422,947	306,337	184,746	180,124	121,529	...	...	Hazara
Lower Kohistan	Pattan	340,017	202,913	122,211	161,428	...	...	...	Hazara
Mansehra	Mansehra	1,797,177	1,556,460	978,157	686,308	552,842	373,975	260,631	Hazara
Hangu	Hangu	528,902	518,798	314,529	182,474	125,721	87,163	55,167	Kohat
Karak	Karak	815,878	706,299	430,796	249,681	191,204	121,199	99,908	Kohat
Kohat	Kohat	1,234,661	1,112,452	651,100	383,862	308,507	209,817	...	Kohat
Kurram	Parachinar	785,434	619,553	430,796	249,681	191,204	121,199	99,908	Kohat
Orakzai	Kalaya	387,561	254,356	225,441	358,751	283,557	209,616	...	Kohat
Bannu	Bannu	1,357,890	1,211,006	695,260	485,240	392,468	...	...	Bannu
Lakki Marwat	Lakki Marwat	1,040,856	902,541	...	...	...	...	...	Bannu
North Waziristan	Miranshah	693,332	543,254	361,246	238,910	250,663	159,470	128,235	Bannu
Khyber	Landi Kotal	1,146,267	986,973	546,730	284,256	378,032	301,319	216,622	Peshawar
Mohmand	Ghalanai	553,933	466,984	334,453	163,933	382,922	294,215	129,300	Peshawar
Nowshera	Nowshera	1,740,705	1,518,540	874,373	537,638	410,718	276,937	222,527	Peshawar
Peshawar	Peshawar	4,758,762	4,333,770	2,080,692	1,150,364	867,144	...	...	Peshawar
Charsadda	Charsadda	1,835,504	1,616,198	1,022,364	630,811	513,193	364,088	282,618	Peshawar
Dera Ismail Khan	Dera Ismail Khan	1,829,811	1,695,688	891,985	550,256	430,051	...	...	Dera Ismail Khan
Upper South Waziristan	Spinkai	...	367,364	...	...	...	...	...	Dera Ismail Khan
Lower South Waziristan	Wana	...	307,851	...	...	...	...	...	Dera Ismail Khan
Paharpur	Paharpur	...	...	...	...	...	...	...	Dera Ismail Khan
Tank	Tank	470,293	428,274	265,432	171,245	120,005	...	...	
Mardan	Mardan	2,744,898	2,373,061	1,460,100	881,465	696,622	481,297	357,455	Mardan
Swabi	Swabi	1,894,600	1,624,616	1,026,804	625,035	507,631	332,543	272,279	Mardan
Upper Chitral	Booni	195,528	169,240	133,815	86,919	71,383	58,213	...	Malakand
Upper Dir	Dir	1,083,566	946,421	575,858	362,565	251,045	...	...	Malakand
Lower Chitral	Chitral	320,407	278,122	184,874	121,641	87,617	54,844	...	Malakand
Lower Dir	Timergara	1,650,183	1,435,917	717,649	404,844	277,481	...	...	Malakand
Malakand	Batkhela	826,250	720,295	452,291	257,797	185,872	133,627	89,699	Malakand
Shangla	Alpuri	891,252	757,810	434,563	251,546	179,813	121,528	107,731	Malakand
Swat	Saidu Sharif	2,687,384	2,309,570	1,257,602	715,938	520,614	344,859	283,720	Malakand
Upper Swat	Matta	1,130,354	...	...	...	...	...	...	Malakand
Bajaur	Khar	1,287,960	1,093,684	595,227	289,206	364,050	280,200	320,985	Malakand
Buner	Daggar	1,016,869	897,319	506,048	265,517	187,984	123,217	109,147	Malakand
Central Dir District	Wari	...	595,227	...	...	...	...	...	

== See also ==
- Districts of Pakistan
  - Districts of Punjab, Pakistan
  - Districts of Sindh
  - Districts of Balochistan, Pakistan
  - Districts of Azad Kashmir
  - Districts of Gilgit-Baltistan
- Divisions of Pakistan
- Tehsils of Pakistan
  - Tehsils of Khyber Pakhtunkhwa

== Notes ==
A. In 2017 Bajaur District was not a district of Khyber Pakhtunkhwa, but was an agency in FATA.

B. In 2017 Bannu District was split into both the "Frontier Region Bannu" (a part of FATA) and "Bannu District".

C. In 2017 Dera Ismail Khan District was split into both the "Frontier Region Dera Ismail Khan" (a part of FATA) and "Dera Ismail Khan District".

D. In 2017 Khyber District was not a district of Khyber Pakhtunkhwa, but was an agency in FATA.

E. In 2017 Kohat District was split into both the "Frontier Region Kohat" (a part of FATA) and "Kohat District".

F. In 2017 Kolai-Palas District was not a district, but a part of the erstwhile Kohistan District. Today it occupies the area the Palas Tehsil used to occupy. Also, due to discrepancies in the source regarding the population of each of Kohistan's Tehsils (when the Tehsils are added one person is missing), a different and more up to date source is used for the districts covering the Kohistan region.

G. In 2017 Kurram District was not a district of Khyber Pakhtunkhwa, but was an agency in FATA.

H. In 2017 Lakki Marwat District was split into both the "Frontier Region Lakki Marwat" (a part of FATA) and "Lakki Marwat District".

I. In 2017 Lower Chitral District was not a district, but a part of the erstwhile Chitral District. Today it occupies the area the Chitral Tehsil (or Chitral Subdivision) used to occupy.

J. In 2017 Lower Kohistan District was not a district, but a part of the erstwhile Kohistan District. Today it occupies the area the Pattan Tehsil used to occupy. Also, due to discrepancies in the source regarding the population of each of Kohistan's Tehsils (when the Tehsils are added one person is missing), a different and more up to date source is used for the districts covering the Kohistan region.

K. In 2017 Mohmand District was not a district of Khyber Pakhtunkhwa, but was an agency in FATA.

L. In 2017 North Waziristan District was not a district of Khyber Pakhtunkhwa, but was an agency in FATA.

M. In 2017 Orakzai District was not a district of Khyber Pakhtunkhwa, but was an agency in FATA.

N. In 2017 Peshawar District was split into both the "Frontier Region Peshawar" (a part of FATA) and "Peshawar District".

O. In 2017 South Waziristan District was not a district of Khyber Pakhtunkhwa, but was an agency in FATA.

P. In 2017 Tank District was split into both the "Frontier Region Tank" (a part of FATA) and "Tank District".

Q. In 2017 Upper Chitral District was not a district, but a part of the erstwhile Chitral District. Today it occupies the area the Mastuj Tehsil (or Mastuj Subdivision) used to occupy.

R. In 2017 Upper Kohistan District was not a district, but a part of the erstwhile Kohistan District. Today it occupies the area the Dassu and Kandia Tehsils used to occupy (between 1998 Kandia Tehsil split off from Dassu Tehsil). Also, due to discrepancies in the source regarding the population of each of Kohistan's Tehsils (when the Tehsils are added one person is missing), a different and more up to date source is used for the districts covering the Kohistan region.

S. No area data is given for Kolai-Palas District and Lower Kohistan District because in the source (dated 1998), Palas Tehsil (which became Kolai-Palas) and Pattan Tehsil (which became Lower Kohistan), even though their populations were reported separately, the area that was given was the combined area of both tehsils. The combined area of both tehsils (which are today districts) is 3,334 km^{2} (1,287 sq mi).
