= Merger of tribal areas with Khyber Pakhtunkhwa =

Events in Pakistan, 2018

On 31 May 2018, with the application of 25th Amendment, the Federally Administered Tribal Areas ceased to exist, and stood merged into neighbouring province of Khyber Pakhtunkhwa.

== Reforms ==
=== Abolition of Frontier Crimes Regulations ===
Two days before the assent to 25th Amendment, President of Pakistan signed a law which was named as FATA Interim Governance Regulation, 2018, This law repealed Frontier Crimes Regulations, 1901, legally abolished the offices of Political Agent, Additional Political Agent, and Assistant Political Agent. It also provided for change of status of tribal agencies into districts and frontier regions into sub-divisions.

=== Administrative Reforms ===
Following the merger, on 10 June 2018, Government of Khyber Pakhtunkhwa abolished the posts of Political Agent and Assistant Political Agents after 116 years of their existence. They were introduced in 1897 by British Government. The Government of Khyber Pakhtunkhwa issued another notification on 19 July 2018, through this notification all the agencies and frontier regions of Former FATA Region were incorporated into KPK. and renamed as districts and subdivisions respectively.

After the repeal of Frontier Crimes Regulations and application of regular laws, Political Agents and Assistant Political Agents who held judicial powers ceased to exist. Deputy Commissioners and Assistant Commissioner were now incapable of deciding judicial cases or act as a magistrate because of separation of power as guaranteed in the Constitution of Pakistan. They were also stripped of financial powers to impose Rahdaris, import and export tax and any kind of levies.

=== Provincial Assembly Elections ===
On 20 July 2019, for the first time in the history of the Former FATA Region, Elections for Provincial Assembly were held. Over 2.8 million residents of tribal areas were made eligible for the first time to elect representatives on provincial level. Ruling Pakistan Tehreek-e-Insaf got majority of the seats in the by-elections. Members representing the tribal districts assumed their offices for the first time on 27 August 2019.

=== Ali Azeem Afridi v. Federation of Pakistan ===
FATA Interim Governance Regulations had provided that for the interim era, Assistant Commissioners in FATA would enjoy judicial powers to help transitioning to the new judicial system. A writ petition was filed by Ali Azeem Afridi in the Peshawar High Court to challenge the FATA Interim Regulations, 2018. Peshawar High Court in its decision dated 30 September 2018, declared FATA Interim Governance Regulation ultra vires the constitution, later Supreme Court of Pakistan also upheld the decision of Peshawar High Court. After the judgement, all laws in force in Khyber Pakhtunkhwa also apply to the Newly Merged Tribal Districts because separate entity as FATA no longer exists.

== Geography ==
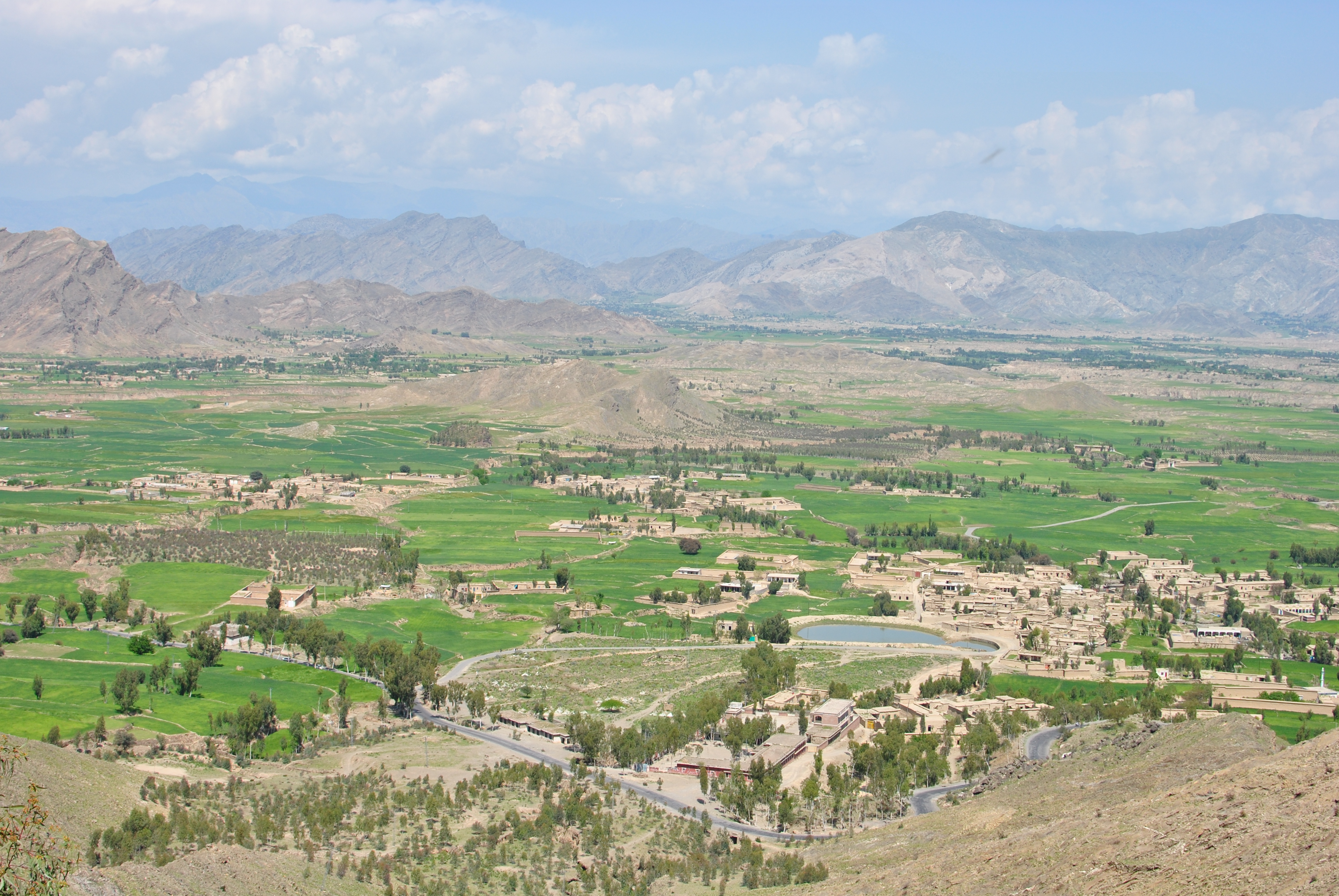
Mohmand District

The Newly Merged Tribal Districts are bordered by: Afghanistan to the north and west with the border marked by the Durand Line, Khyber Pakhtunkhwa to the east, and Balochistan to the south.

The seven Tribal Districts lay in a north-to-south strip that is adjacent to the west side of the six Tribal Sub Divisions, which also lie in a north-to-south strip. The areas within each of those two regions are geographically arranged in a sequence from north to south.

The geographical arrangement of the seven Tribal Districts in order from north to south is: Bajaur District, Mohmand District, Khyber District, Orakzai District, Kurram District, North Waziristan District, Upper South Waziristan District and Lower South Waziristan District (Mahsud South Waziristan District.

The geographical arrangement of the six Tribal Sub Divisions in order from north to south is: Peshawar Subdivision, Kohat Subdivision, Bannu Subdivision, Lakki Marwat Subdivision, FR Tank, Dera Ismail Khan Subdivision.

== Demographics ==
Historical population
| Year | Pop. | ±% p.a. |
|---|---|---|
| 1951 | 1,332,005 | — |
| 1961 | 1,847,195 | +3.32% |
| 1972 | 2,491,230 | +2.76% |
| 1981 | 2,198,547 | −1.38% |
| 1998 | 2,746,490 | +1.32% |
| 2017 | 5,001,676 | +3.21% |

=== Languages ===
First languages of the Federally Administered Tribal Areas
| Pashto | 98.4% |
| Urdu | 0.49% |
| Punjabi | 0.28% |
| Sindhi | 0.89% |
| Balochi | 0.08% |

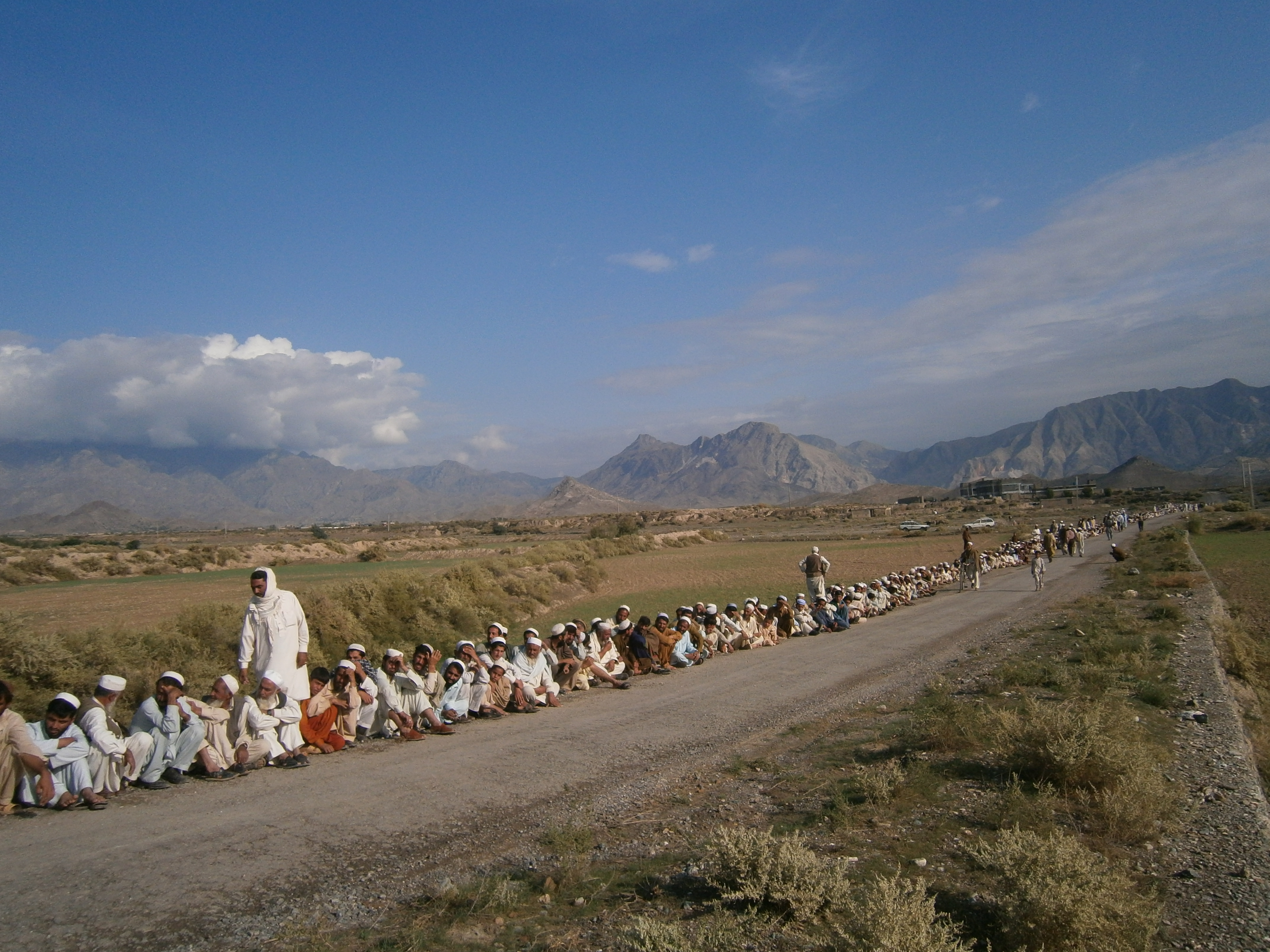
Pashtuns in the Baizai area

The total population of the Federally Administered Tribal Areas was estimated in 2000 to be about 3,341,080 people, or roughly 2% of Pakistan's population. Only 3.1% of the population resides in established townships. It is thus the most rural administrative unit in Pakistan. According to 2011 estimates FATA gained 62.1% population over its 1998 figures, totaling up to 4,452,913. This is the fourth-highest increase in population of any province, after that of Balochistan, Sindh and Gilgit-Baltistan. 99.1% of population speaks the Pashto language.

The main tribes of the Pashtuns living in the Federally Administered Tribal Areas are Wazir, Afridi, Mohmand, Tarkani, Mahsud, Dawar, Bettani, Sherani, Turi, Orakzai, Bangash, Shinwari, and Safi and utmanzi..

=== Religions ===
Over 99.6% of the population is Muslim belonging to the Sunni Hanafi Fiqh.

According to a report by the government of Pakistan there are around 50,000 religious minorities living in former Fata region. These include 20,000 Sikh, 20,000 Christians and 10,000 Hindus.

Religions in the Federally Administered Tribal Areas
| Religion | Percent |
| Islam | 99.6% |
| Christianity | 0.07% |
| Others† | 0.34% |
Distribution of religions †Includes Sikhs, Parsis, Hindus .
