= Kirri Khaisore =

- Town and union council
- Interactive map of Kirri Khaisore
- Country: Pakistan
- Province: Khyber Pakhtunkhwa
- District: Paharpur District
- Tehsil: Paharpur

Government
  - Nazim: Inyat Ullah Khan Niazi
  - Naib Nazim: Abdul Razaq Khan

Population
  - Total: 90,000 appx
- Time zone: UTC+5 (PST)
- Postal code: 29180
- Website: https://www.khaisorejobs.site

Kirri Khaisore is a town and union council of Paharpur District in Khyber Pakhtunkhwa province of Pakistan. It is located at 32°19′48″N 71°11′54″E and has an altitude of 189 metres (623 feet).

Kirri Khaisore is a very important area of D I Khan.
