= Frontier Regions =

Former administrative units in Pakistan

Location of the Frontier Regions in the Federally Administered Tribal Areas

The Frontier Regions (often abbreviated as FR) of Pakistan were a group of small administrative units in the Federally Administered Tribal Areas (FATA), lying immediately to the east of the seven main tribal agencies and west of the settled districts of Khyber Pakhtunkhwa. Each of the Frontier Regions was named after an adjoining settled district and was administered by the district coordination officer (DCO) of that adjacent district. The overall administration of the Frontier Regions was carried out by the FATA Secretariat based in Peshawar, the capital of Khyber Pakhtunkhwa.

== List and details ==
The six Regions are listed in the table provided below.

| Region | DCO | Area (km^{2}) | Population | Population density (inh. per km^{2}) |
|---|---|---|---|---|
| Frontier Region Bannu | M. Javed Marwat | 745 | 19,593 | 26 |
| Frontier Region Dera Ismail Khan | Syed Mohsin Shah | 2,008 | 38,990 | 19 |
| Frontier Region Kohat | Mr. Siraj Ahmad | 446 | 88,456 | 198 |
| Frontier Region Lakki Marwat | M. Anwar Khan Mehsud | 132 | 6,987 | 53 |
| Frontier Region Peshawar | Sahibzada M. Anees | 261 | 53,841 | 206 |
| Frontier Region Tank | Barkat Ullah | 1,221 | 27,216 | 22 |
| Total | | 4,813 | 235,083 | 49 |

== See also ==
- Federally Administered Tribal Areas
- Bannu District
- Dera Ismail Khan District
- Kohat District
- Lakki Marwat District
- Peshawar District
- Tank District
