= Akhorwal =

Akhorwal اخوروال
- Location within FATA Location within Pakistan
- Coordinates: 33.73°N 71.51°E
- Country: Pakistan
- Region: Federally Administered Tribal Areas
- District: Frontier Region Kohat

Population (2017)
  - Total: 22,559
- Time zone: UTC+5 (PST)

Akhorwal or Akhurwal (اخوروال) is a town in Darra Adam Khel in Frontier Region Kohat of the Federally Administered Tribal Areas of Pakistan. Akhorwal has a population of 22,559 according to the 2017 Census of Pakistan. It is located between the cities of Peshawar and Kohat. It is home to FATA University.

== History ==
After coal mines were discovered in Akhorwal, people of the region disputed how the income from mines should be distributed. On July 23, 2017 an official decision was made for the Pirwal Khel sub-tribe to receive 27 percent of the income, 36.5 of the remaining 73 divides per person on total population of Bulaki Khel and Gadiya Khel combined. The remaining 36.5 of 73 divides on a tribal system called MOJAB which was introduced by the British.

== See also ==
- Darra Adam Khel
- FATA University
