= Bigwani Shumali =

Coordinates: 32°8′0″N 71°1′0″E

- Town and union council
- Interactive map of Bigwani Shumali
- Country: Pakistan
- Province: Khyber-Pakhtunkhwa
- District: Paharpur District
- Established: 17-07-2019

Government

Population (73000)
  - Town and union council: 73,500
  - Urban: 50,000
- Time zone: UTC+5 (PST)
- 29161: 29161

Bigwani Shumali is a town and union council of Paharpur District in Khyber-Pakhtunkhwa province of Pakistan. It is located at 32°7'60N 71°1'0E and has an altitude of 169 metres (557 feet). Muhammad Rustam Malana is the councler of Bigwani Shumali and Malik Rehmatullah is the Nazim of Bigwani Shumali.
