= M. Qasim Jan =

Pakistani geologist

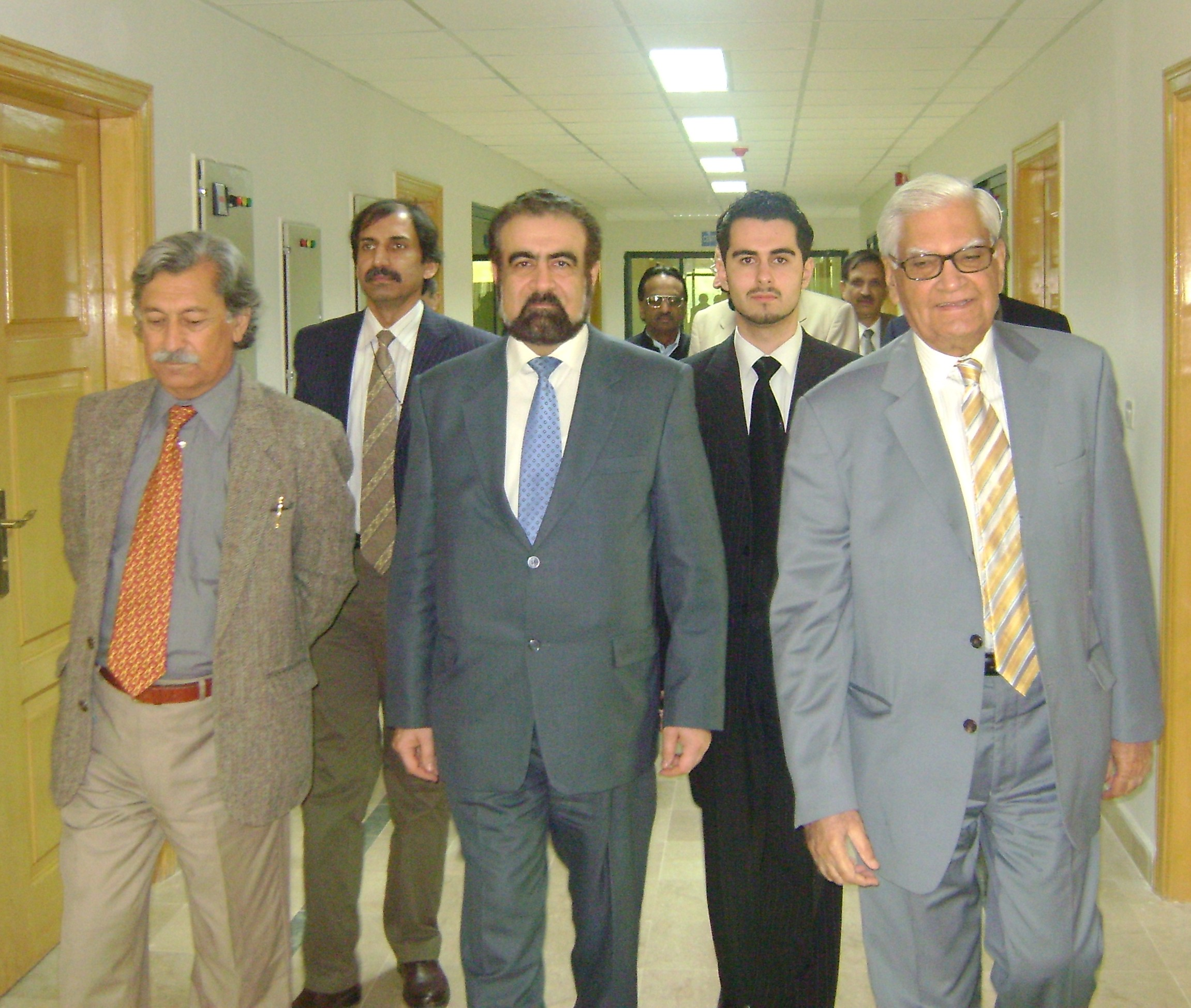
- Dr. Qasim Jan (far left)
- Born: 10 January 1944 (age 82); Hangu, Pakistan
- Citizenship: Pakistan
- Education: University of Peshawar; University of Oregon; University of London
- Known for: his work on petrology of the Kohistan Himalaya
- Awards: Hilal-i-Imtiaz (2010); Sitara-i-Imtiaz (1999); Tamgha-i-Imtiaz (1993); Distinguished Scientist of the year (1990, 2009); Earth Scientist of the Year (1986); Honorary D.Sc. (King's College, London, 2009)
- Scientific career
- Fields: Geology, mineralogy, petrology, geochemistry and tectonics
- Workplaces: University of Peshawar; Quaid-i-Azam University, Islamabad; Higher Education Commission; Sarhad Univ. of S&IT, Peshawar; King's College, London; National Centre of Excellence in Geology; University of Oregon; University of Leicester; University of Oklahoma; Dartmouth College
- Doctoral advisor: Robert A. Howie

M. Qasim Jan (born 10 January 1944) is a geologist and research scientist from Pakistan. He has been the vice-chancellor of three Pakistani universities. His research has been in geology, mineralogy, petrology, geochemistry, and tectonics. He has authored or edited a dozen books, and has published numerous papers on geology and tectonics of the North-West Himalayas. Presently, he is Professor Emeritus at the National Centre of Excellence in Geology, University of Peshawar. Jan is also currently the Secretary General of the Pakistan Academy of Sciences, and of the Association of the Academies of Sciences in Asia. He is also a fellow of the Academy of Sciences for the Developing World (TWAS).

== Life and education ==
Jan was born in Hangu, Pakistan in 1944. He received his elementary and secondary education from various places in northern Pakistan. In 1964, he received a BSc, with First Class Honours in geology, from the University of Peshawar (UoP). He went to the United States to attend the University of Oregon, from where he received a M.S. in 1967. He became a lecturer in UoP in 1968. In 1970, he was promoted to assistant professor at the university. Later, he went to the United Kingdom to pursue his PhD at the University of London King's College. In 1977 he was awarded a PhD in geology, writing his thesis on The mineralogy, geochemistry and petrology of Swat Kohistan, N.W. Pakistan, under the supervision of the mineralogist Robert A. Howie. After his PhD, he returned to Peshawar, where he became Associate Professor in 1979, full Professor in 1983, and Dean of Natural Sciences faculty in 1997.

== Academic career ==
From October 2005 to February 2010 he was Vice-Chancellor of Quaid-i-Azam University, Islamabad. Jan remained actively engaged in studying various aspects of the geology of the northeast Himalayas and Karakoram, and published a large number of papers both nationally and internationally.

== Selected publications ==
- Jan, M. Q.; Howie, R. A. (1 February 1981). "The Mineralogy and Geochemistry of the Metamorphosed Basic and Ultrabasic Rocks of the Jijal Complex, Kohistan, NW Pakistan". Journal of Petrology. 22 (1): 85–126. doi:10.1093/petrology/22.1.85.
- Searle, M. P.; Windley, B. F.; Coward, M. P.; Cooper, D. J. W.; Rex, A. J.; Rex, D.; Tingdong, Li; Xuchang, Xiao; Jan, M. Q.; Thakur, V. C.; Kumar, S. (1 June 1987). "The closing of Tethys and the tectonics of the Himalaya". GSA Bulletin. 98 (6): 678–701. Bibcode:1987GSAB...98..678S. doi:10.1130/0016-7606(1987)98<678:TCOTAT>2.0.CO;2. ISSN 0016-7606.
- Jan, M. Q.; Windley, B. F. (1 June 1990). "Chromian Spinel-Silicate Chemistry in Ultramafic Rocks of the Jijal Complex, Northwest Pakistan". Journal of Petrology. 31 (3): 667–715. doi:10.1093/petrology/31.3.667.
- O'Brien, P. J.; Zotov, N.; Law, R.; Khan, M. A.; Jan, M. Q. (1 May 2001). "Coesite in Himalayan eclogite and implications for models of India-Asia collision". Geology. 29 (5): 435–438. Bibcode:2001Geo....29..435O. doi:10.1130/0091-7613(2001)029<0435:CIHEAI>2.0.CO;2.

== Awards and honours ==
- Emeritus Fellow, Mineralogical Society of Great Britain (2009)
- Hilal-i-Imtiaz, (2010)
- Sitara-i-Imtiaz, (1999)
- Tamgha-i-Imtiaz (1994)
