= Paniala Tehsil =

Paniala Tehsil تحصیل پنياله پنياله تحصیل
- Tehsil
- Country: Pakistan
- Province: Khyber Pakhtunkhwa
- District: Paharpur
- Seat: Paharpur
- Time zone: UTC+5 (PST)

Paniala Tehsil is a tehsil of Paharpur District, Khyber Pakhtunkhwa, Pakistan.

== See also ==
- Paharpur Tehsil
