= Wanda Khan Muhammad =

Coordinates: 32°19′N 70°59′E

- Town and union council
- Interactive map of Wanda Khan Muhammad
- Country: Pakistan
- Province: Khyber Pakhtunkhwa
- District: Paharpur District
- Time zone: UTC+5 (PST)

Wanda Khan Muhammad is a town and union council of Paharpur District in Khyber Pakhtunkhwa province of Pakistan.
