= Akhagram =

Akhagram Karo
- Tehsil
- Country: Pakistan
- Province: Khyber Pakhtunkhwa
- District: Central Dir
- Time zone: UTC+5 (PST)

Akhagram Karo is a Union Council as well as tehsil of Central Dir District in the Khyber Pakhtunkhwa province of Pakistan.

Previously, it was a union council of Wari Tehsil of Upper Dir District but in the 2022 bifurcation of Central Dir District, it was made a tehsil of Central Dir District.

== See also ==
- Upper Dir District
