= Ghulam Muhammad Qasir =

Pakistani Urdu poet (1944–1999)

- Born: 4 September 1944; Paharpur, D.I. Khan, NWFP, Pakistan
- Died: 20 February 1999 (aged 54); Peshawar, NWFP, Pakistan
- Occupation: Urdu poet
- Writing career
- Notable awards: Pride of Performance, 2006; Bolan Award

Ghulam Muhammad Qasir (Urdu: غلام محمد قاصر 4 September 1944 – 20 February 1999) was a Pakistani Urdu poet. He was considered to be one of the finest modern poets of Urdu Ghazal. Ahmad Nadeem Qasmi first introduced him in his famous literary journal "Fanoon" in 1977. Ghulam Muhammad Qasir came up with his first collection of poetry, called "Tasalsul", the same year and received warm acceptance across the country. The Government of Pakistan awarded him the Presidential Pride of Performance in 2006–07, posthumously, for his valuable contribution to Urdu literature.

== Life ==
Ghulam Muhammad Qasir was born in Paharpur, Dera Ismail Khan.

After finishing secondary school at Government High School Paharpur, he was appointed as a teacher in the same school. Qasir taught in many different schools adjacent to Dera Ismail Khan. While working as a teacher Qasir kept improving his education. After completing his master's degree in Urdu literature, he was first appointed as a lecturer at Government College Mardan. He also worked at Science Superior College Peshawar, Government College Dara Adam Khel, Government College Peshawar, Government College Toru, and Government College Pabbi. He wrote over 70 dramas and programs for PTV Peshawar and Radio Pakistan, including popular TV serials like Talash and Bhoot Bangla (Haunted Bungalow).

He died on 20 February 1999 and is buried in Peshawar.

== Literary contributions ==
- Rang e Adbad Publications Karachi published Ghulam Muhammad Qasir number in June 2022
- Sar e Shaakh e Yaqeen (Hamd, Na`at, Manqabat) 2020
- Ik sher abhi tak rehta hai (Kuliyat-e-Qasir) (complete poetry) 2009 & 2018
- Darya-e-Gumaan (an anthology of poetry) 1997
- Aathwaan aasman bhi neela hai (an anthology of poetry) 1988
- Tasalsul (an anthology of poetry) 1977
- Qasir wrote many essays which were printed by leading literary journals, besides, he wrote prefaces for some of the poetry anthologies

== Research ==
- Qasir remained on the list of contributors to the Textbook Board of NWFP for classes 7th, 11th & 12th in the subject of Urdu in the early 1990s.
- Since 1968 Qasir remained a regular contributor to all the leading literary national journals in the field of poetry, essays and literary criticism.

== Laurels ==
- Pride of Performance award for Poetry by the Government of Pakistan 2006–07
- Parveen Shakir "Aks-e-Khushboo" award for best poetry (Daryaa-e-Gumaa`n) Parveen Shakir Trust, Islamabad 1998
- Golden Jubilee award-Peshawar University Teachers Association 1996–97
- Pakistan-Iran Friendship award, Khana-e-Farhang-e-Iran, Lahore 1996
- Mehfil-e-Sabza-o-Gul award, Pakistan Writers Guild 1996
- 15th Anniversary of Great Islamic Revolution award- Khana-e-Farhang-e-Iran, Peshawar 1994
- Waseeqa-e-Aitraaf, Shaam-e-Hamdard, Hamdard Foundation Peshawar 1994
- Best Lyricist PTV Award, PTV Peshawar 1993
- Bolan award for best dramatist / poetry, Bolan academy 1993
- Sardar Abdur Rab Nishtar award (Gold Medal) for best poetry (Aathwaan aasmaan bhi neela hai) Abaseen Arts Council Peshawar 1988–89
- Presidential National Award (Seerat Conference) 1987

== Tributes ==
- Ghulam Muhammad Qasir Academy was founded in Nawan Kali Toru (Mardan) by one of his students, Mr. Pir Zada,
- A Forum was founded by the name of "Tasalsul" in Peshawar, which brings out a literary journal.
- Qasir was the founder and the first chairman of a literary society " Takhleeq, International" Peshawar.
- Qasir remained a member of the Pakistan Writers' guild and Abaseen Arts Council, Peshawar.
- All writings of Qasir enjoyed huge popularity especially among young people.
- Thousands of Qasir's students have greatly appreciated him and are working on several high posts throughout the country
- * Professor Dr. Sohail Ahmad has published his MPhil research thesis on "The life and works of Ghulam Muhammad Qasir" from the University of Peshawar.
- From 1970 until his death (1999) he regularly participated in all important national & religious functions and occasions on Radio Pakistan and Pakistan Television PTV Peshawar
- Qasir has written a large number of dramas and programmes for PTV, among which the most popular serials were Talash and Bhoot Bangla (Haunted Bungalow).
- Qasir has participated in many International Literary Symposia, Conferences, and Mushairas in the United States, where he was highly appreciated.
- Qasir participated in many literary conferences held under the auspices of "Halqa-e-Arbab-e-Zoq, New York.

== Website ==
- www.qasir.com Through this website short introduction, photographs, selective poetry and details of awards can be found.

== See also ==
- Urdu poetry
- List of Urdu poets
- List of Pakistani writers
