= FATA Development Authority =

Former government body in Pakistan

- فاٹا ڈویلپمنٹ اتھارٹی

Agency overview
- Formed: 2007
- Dissolved: 2019; 7 years ago
- Headquarters: Peshawar, Pakistan
- Minister responsible: Governor of Khyber Pakhtunkhwa
- Parent agency: Government of Pakistan
- Website: Official website

The FATA Development Authority was a regulatory development organisation which executed construction and development projects in the former Federally Administered Tribal Areas of Pakistan. Based in Peshawar, the body was chaired by the Governor of Khyber Pakhtunkhwa.

== History ==
The FDA was established in 2007 as a result of the ongoing Insurgency in Khyber Pakhtunkhwa. The region, affected by terrorism, was experiencing a downfall of infrastructure. There was hence an incentive from the President of Pakistan to propose an organisation which would "restructure the administrative and developmental regime in FATA" as well as tackle poverty.

In the financial year 2009-10, the FDA announced a focus development program where it would spend 1.15 billion rupees on 44 development schemes in eight designated sectors. The statement was made during a meeting presided by several committee members, including the provincial governor, Owais Ahmed Ghani. Additional proposals were made for the future construction of several dams and solar energy projects in FATA.

In August 2019, the Government of Khyber Pakhtunkhwa dissolved the authority after FATA merger.

== See also ==
- Administrative System of the Federally Administered Tribal Areas
