= Nihag =

Coordinates: 35°03′N 72°07′E

Nihag نہاگ
- Tehsil
- Country: Pakistan
- Province: Khyber Pakhtunkhwa
- District: Central Dir
- Tehsil status: 2022
- Time zone: UTC+5 (PST)

Nihag (Urdu: نہاگ; Pashto: نهاګ) or Nihag Dara is a town in the Nihag Union Council, Central Dir District in the Khyber Pakhtunkhwa province of Pakistan.

Previously, it was a union council of Wari Tehsil of Upper Dir District. In 2022, Central Dir District was created, and Nihag Dera union council was established as a tehsil of the new district.

Nihag has been the site of militant attacks in the recent years in the wake of the Khyber Pakhtunkhwa insurgency.

== Notable people ==
- Razaullah Mashwani (born 2005), Pakistani cricketer
