= Kolai-Palas Kohistan District =

Kolai-Palas Kohistan District ضلع کولئی-پالس کوہستان
- District of Khyber Pakhtunkhwa
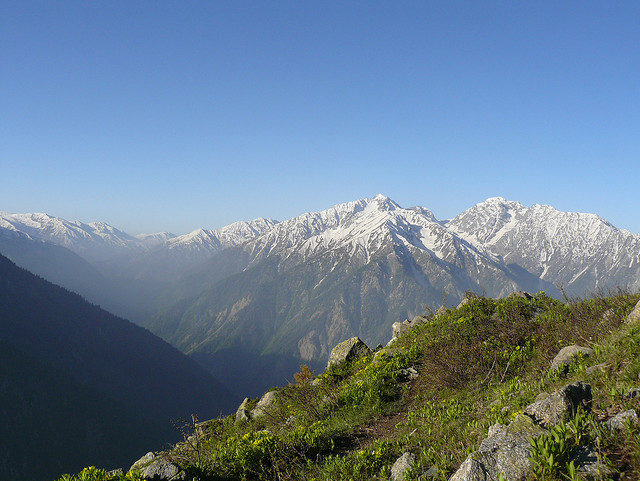
- Palas Valley

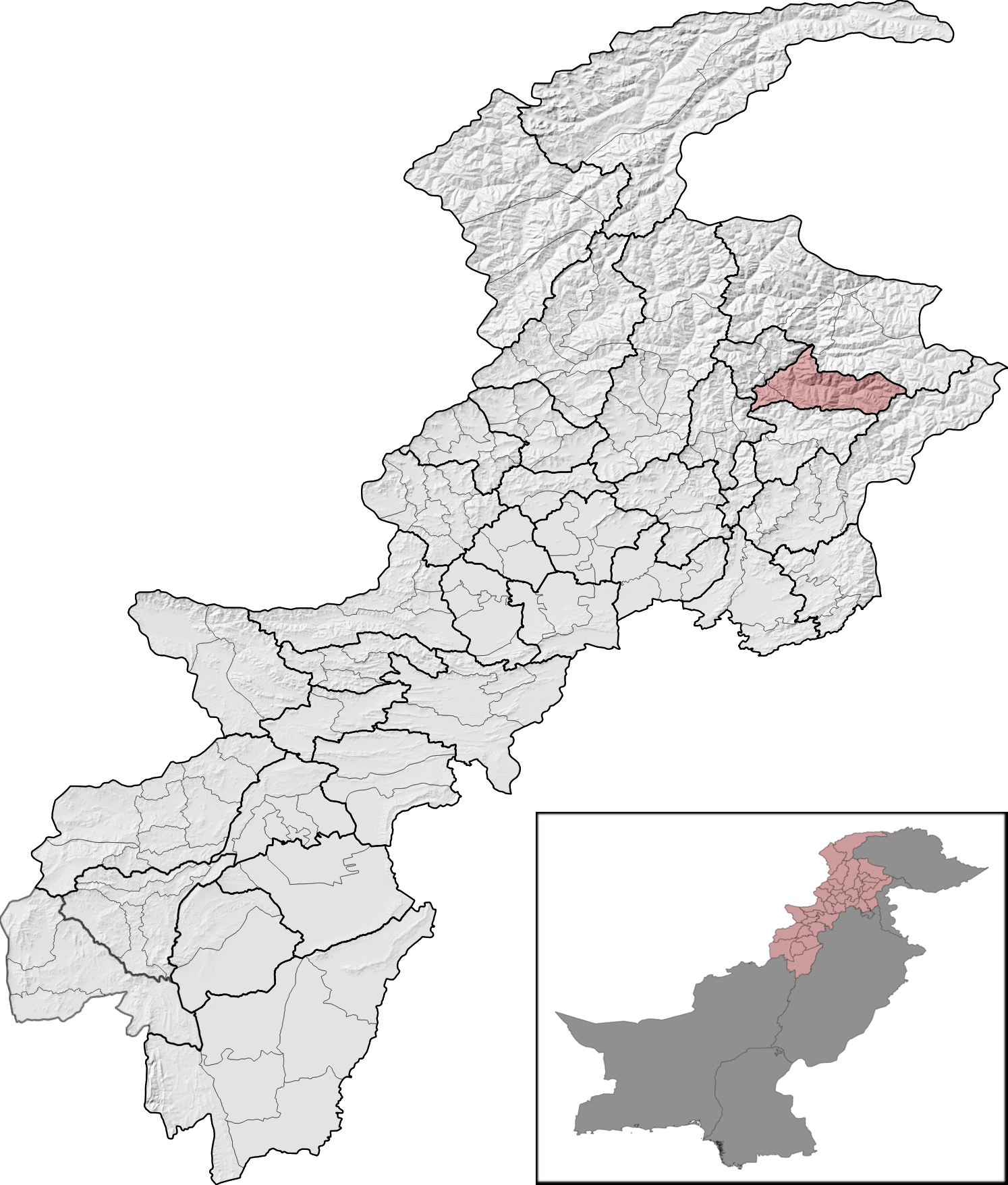
- Kolar-Palas District (red) in Khyber Pakhtunkhwa
- Country: Pakistan
- Province: Khyber Pakhtunkhwa
- Division: Hazara
- Established: 2017

Government
  - Type: District Administration
  - Deputy Commissioner: Noor Ul Amin
  - District Police Officer: Amjad Hussain Awan
  - District Health Officer: N/A

Area
  - District of Khyber Pakhtunkhwa: 1,410 km^{2} (540 sq mi)

Population (2023)
  - District of Khyber Pakhtunkhwa: 280,162
  - Density: 198.7/km^{2} (515/sq mi)
  - Urban: 0
  - Rural: 280,162

Literacy
  - Literacy rate: Total: (18.80%); Male: (24.24%); Female: (13.14%)
- Time zone: PST
- Number of Tehsils: 2
- Website: kolaipallas.kp.gov.pk

Kolai-Palas Kohistan District (Urdu: ضلع کولئی-پالس کوہستان) is a district in the Hazara Division of the Khyber Pakhtunkhwa province of Pakistan. It was a sub-division of the Kohistan district within the Hazara division till it attained the status of a separate district in 2017.

== History ==
Kolai-Pallas was carved as a district out of Lower Kohistan District by upgrading the old Pallas sub-division in 2017. On 31 May 2018, Battera Kolai was carved out of Pallas tehsil making two tehsils in total for Kolai-Pallas.

== Demographics ==
=== Population ===
The population estimate for the district in 2021 was 275,461 and as of the 2023 census, Kolai-Palas district has 33,983 households and a population of 280,162. The district has a sex ratio of 103.65 males to 100 females and a literacy rate of 18.80%: 24.24% for males and 13.14% for females. 102,642 (43.36% of the surveyed population) are under 10 years of age. The entire population lives in rural areas, from 1981 to 2023 the population increased by approximately 227%, this is an average increase of 1.95% per annum.

Historical population
Year	Pop.	±% p.a.
1981	123,685	—
1998	165,613	+1.73%
2017	274,923	+2.70%
2023	280,162	+0.32%

=== Language ===
Languages of Kolai-Palas district (2023)
1. Kohistani (referring to Kohistani Shina) (85.2%)
2. Shina (also referring to Kohistani Shina) (7.75%)
3. Pashto (2.81%)
4. Urdu (0.31%)
5. Others (mainly Bateri, Gujari, and Chilisso) (3.94%)

As of the 2023 census, 85.19% of the population identified their language as Kohistani, 7.75% Shina and 2.81% Pashto as their first language. 4.03% of the population speaks languages classified as 'Others'. However the designation Kohistani is applied equally to different unrelated languages in the region, including the Kohistani Shina (a Shina dialect), mainly spoken in the eastern side of the Indus River which include Kolai-Palas, and Indus Kohistani, mainly spoken in the western side of the Indus River. Speakers of Kohistani Shina commonly selected Kohistani as a single census option. Total 5 languages spoken in the district including Gujari. As per 2023 estimates by Tablue Public in Kolai Palas District Gujari along with Kohistani is spoken by 68.50% of the population. Urdu is spoken by 0.31%.

=== Religion ===
787 (0.33% of the surveyed population) people in the district are from religious minorities, mainly Christians.

== Administrative Units ==
The district currently has two Tehsils:

Tehsil	Name (Urdu)	Area (km²)	Pop. (2023)	Density (ppl/km²) (2023)	Literacy rate (2023)
Bataira / Kolai	(Urdu: تحصیل بٹیرا کولئی)	170	142,660	839.18	15.93%
Palas	(Urdu: تحصیل پالس)	1,240	137,502	110.89	23.08%

The district is divided into 13 Wards (previously known as Union Councils), and 52 village councils.

=== Provincial Assembly ===
Member of Provincial Assembly	Party affiliation	Constituency	Year
Sardar Mohammad Riaz	Independent	PK-33 Kolai Palas	2024

== See also ==
- Kohistan District
- Kohistan region
- Districts of Pakistan
  - Districts of Khyber Pakhtunkhwa
  - Districts of Punjab, Pakistan
  - Districts of Balochistan, Pakistan
  - Districts of Sindh, Pakistan
  - Districts of Azad Kashmir
  - Districts of Gilgit-Baltistan
- Divisions of Pakistan
  - Divisions of Balochistan
  - Divisions of Khyber Pakhtunkhwa
  - Divisions of Punjab, Pakistan
  - Divisions of Sindh
  - Divisions of Azad Kashmir
  - Divisions of Gilgit-Baltistan
