= South Waziristan Agency =

Former Tribal Agency in Pakistan

South Waziristan Agency was an agency of the Federally Administered Tribal Areas until the region was merged with Khyber Pakhtunkhwa in 2018.

== Geography ==
The agency was created during the British Raj and lay between 31°55′ and 32°45′N. and 69°20′ and 70º15'E.

- Northern boundary: 32°45′N 69°47′E
- Southern boundary: 31°55′N 69°47′E
- Eastern boundary: 32°20′N 70°15′E
- Western boundary: 32°20′N 69°20′E

It had an area of about 7,081.03 square kilometers. It was bordered on the north by the range which terminates in the Ghalimighar and divides it from Northern Waziristan, while on the east its boundary ran due south along a continuation of the Babaghar range to Jandola, where it rose to the Girni Sar and then descended to the valley of the Gomal River above Murtaza. On the south as far as Kajuri Kach in the Gomal valley it was separated from the Shirani country by the hills south of the Gomal River, the highest of which is the famous Takht-i-Sulaiman. West of Kajuri Kach the Gomal was the boundary between the Agency and the Baluchistan District of Zhob. On the west it extended to the Durand Line, demarcated in 1894. The Agency included all the country occupied by the Mahsud branch of Wazirs, and, on the west, portions of the country of the Darwesh Khel Wazirs. The whole area was mountainous in the extreme, the chief peaks being Shuidar (3,400 m), Jānimela (2,560 m), Pir Ghal (3,536 m), Kundighar (8,100 m), Girni Sar (2468 m), Drenashtar Narai (2667 m), Nomin (3291 m), and Sarwar Gul (3261 m). The last two are in the Marwattai range which runs along the Afghan border.

The outer spurs of the Wazir hills are to the eye utterly barren and desolate, though here and there the scanty soil nourishes a few stunted wild olive and gurgurra bushes. These hills, however, afford good grazing for goats. The inner hills with their greater elevation are more thickly wooded with ilex and pine, and the grassy uplands are dotted in places with wild flowers. To the south-west the aspect of the country changes into wide open plains, which from a distance look like rolling grassy pampas, but are covered with stones and boulders and scored by waterless ravines. The chief plains are Zarmelān (north-east of Domandi), Wānā, and Spīn.

The main river in Southern Waziristan was the Gomal, which has a strong current, with a depth of 60 cm to 6 m, and a width of 18 m to 91 m , even in times of drought. It entered British territory at Domandi in the south-west corner of the Agency, it flowed almost due east along its southern border, receiving numerous tributaries on its left bank, but only one, the Zhob, of any importance on its right. It then breaks through the Sulaiman range and debouches on the Derajat plains near Murtaza. The only other perennial streams are the Tank Zam and its tributary the Shahür, which drain the whole Mahsud country; and the Wānā Toi, which rises at the head of the Dhana valley and falls into the Gomal at Toi Khulla. The other rivers were just torrents, dangerous after heavy rainfall but dry at most seasons of the year.

== History ==
The Mahsud tribe had once been raiders on the North-West Frontier Province; and in 1860 a long series of raids culminated in an attempt to sack the town of Tank in Dera Ismail Khan District, which was frustrated by Resaldar Saadat Khan in command of a detachment of the 5th Punjab Cavalry. This was followed by a punitive expedition under Brigadier-General Chamberlain, which, in the same year, advanced to Kaniguram and inflicted great loss on the tribe, but did not secure its submission. The raids continued; and though in 1863 the Mahsuds entered into an agreement to keep the peace, it was promptly broken, while in 1878 they advanced, 2,000 or 3,000 strong, on Tank and burnt the town. This incident was the signal for an outbreak of violence, in which several villages were burnt by the tribes on the border, and which was only suppressed after severe fighting.

=== Second expedition ===
In 1881 a second punitive expedition invaded the Mahsud country and again penetrated to Kaniguram, but failed to exact compliance with the conditions imposed by the British Government; and the blockade was continued until hostages were given and the compensation due from the tribe was gradually realised by a tax on all their exports into British territory. From 1881 to 1891 the Mahsuds had stopped attacks; and in 1889 Sir Robert Sandeman succeeded in opening up the Gomal Pass, nearly Rs. 50,000 in annual allowances being paid to the Mahsuds in return for their guarding it. The Ahmadzai Wazirs of Wana also received allowances.

=== War with Afghanistan ===
In 1892 Abdur Rahman Khan, the Amir of Afghanistan, made attempts to obtain control of Waziristan, and in the summer of that year numerous attacks were committed on British territory. Troops were then advanced to Jandola and Kajuri Kach; and the Amir's agents having withdrawn, affairs settled down again until the garrisons were reduced, whereupon raiding began again in the Gomal and Zhob valleys, and in June, 1893, a British official was murdered. The murderers were surrendered, but two of the maliks who handed them over were in turn assassinated. During 1893 the Amir renounced all claims to Waziristan, and in 1894 a British Commission was appointed to demarcate the boundary from Domandi northwards.

=== Mulla Powinda ===
Meanwhile, the Wazir attacks had not ceased, and the British Government resolved to accept the invitation of Ahmadzai Darwesh Khel of Wana to occupy their territory, thereby hoping to secure the peace of the Gomal Pass. Spin and Wana were declared protected areas; but the escort encamped at the latter place was attacked by the Mahsuds under the Mulla Powinda, a religious leader, who had assumed the title of Badshah-i-Taliban, and acquired great influence over the Mahsuds. A third punitive expedition was dispatched in the cold season of 1894-5 under Sir William Lockhart, whose columns overran the Mahsud country, and severely punished the sections of the tribes which had been implicated in the attack on Wana.

=== Creation of the agency ===
The boundary with Afghanistan was then finally demarcated in 1895; and in 1896 Southern Waziristan was constituted a Political Agency under a Political Agent subordinate to the Commissioner of the Derajat, with head-quarters at Wana. During 1896-7 affairs were quiet in the Agency, and it was the only portion of the north-west frontier which did not share in the general rising of 1897-8. But between July, 1898, and the end of 1899, numerous attacks occurred, and, though a conciliatory policy was adopted, the attacks continued, until in 1900 the Mahsuds were strictly blockaded. The British Government was eventually able to treat with a full tribal jirga capable of enforcing its decrees on the whole community, and the terms imposed by Government were accepted by it. The Darwesh Khel had at no time given trouble, and since the blockade the Mahsuds had refrained from raiding in British territory. This has rendered possible the withdrawal of the regular troops; and except at Jandola, where there were two companies of regulars, the only force maintained for the safeguarding of the protected area was the Southern Waziristan militia, 1,576 strong, including 159 mounted men.

=== End of the agency ===
After Pakistan became independent in 1947, South Waziristan Agency became part of the Federally Administered Tribal Areas - it eventually became the district of South Waziristan in 2018 when FATA was merged into the province of Khyber Pakhtunkhwa.
