= Mohammad Tahir Shah =

Professor and Vice chancellor (born 1956)

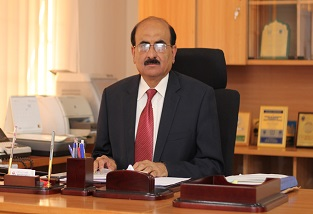
- Born: 20 July 1956 (age 70); Sirikot, Pakistan, Pakistan
- Citizenship: Pakistan
- Education: University of Peshawar; University of South Carolina; University of Nevada; University of Leicester
- Known for: Geological research in understanding the genesis of the various types of rocks, mineral deposits (especially Lead Zinc, Copper and Manganese) and gemstones in the northern parts of Pakistan. He has carried out research in the field of Environmental Geology.
- Awards: Tamgha-i-Imtiaz (2014); Izaz-I-Fazeelat (2001); Gold Medal of the Pakistan Academy of Sciences (2005); Earth Scientist of the Year (1994); Productivity Awards (2003–2005) and (2009–2013)
- Scientific career
- Fields: Geology, geochemistry, economic geology, mineral exploration and environmental geology
- Workplaces: FATA University; National Centre of Excellence in Geology
- Doctoral advisor: John W. Shervais

Mohammad Tahir Shah (born 20 July 1956) is a Pakistani professor at the National Centre of Excellence in Geology (NCEG) at the University of Peshawar. He has served at the NCEG since 2013. He was previously selected as the vice-chancellor of the Fata University by Governor Khyber Pakhtunkhwa Sardar Mahtab Ahmad Khan.

Mohammad Tahir Shah has organized two international and four national-level conferences/workshops on science and technology and has delivered talks at conferences in the United States, United Kingdom, Italy, Austria, China, Bangkok, Sri Lanka, Bangladesh, and Afghanistan.

Shah has carried out extensive geological research in understanding the genesis of diverse types of rocks, mineral deposits (such as lead, zinc, copper, and manganese), and gemstones in the northern parts of Pakistan. He supervised an international collaborative exploration for source materials in the Gilgit-Baltistan region. His establishment of a geochemistry lab at the NCEG promotes the analysis of rocks, minerals, soil, plants, and water. Researchers throughout Pakistan reference geochemical data from this laboratory.

== Education and life ==
Mohammad Tahir Shah was born in the village of Sirikot, Ghazi Tehsil, Haripur District, Khyber Pakhtunkhwa on 20 July 1956. He completed his primary education at Mianwali Central Model School in 1972 and his intermediate education at the Islamia College Peshawar in 1975. He completed a Bachelor of Science degree in Geology in 1978 and a Master's in Geology in 1981 from the University of Peshawar.

After his education, he was appointed as a research associate in the National Centre of Excellence in Geology, University of Peshawar in 1982. In 1986, he received his first M.Phil. degree in geology from the University of Peshawar. He won the Thomas Jefferson Ph.D. scholarship at the University of South Carolina in 1987 before returning to Pakistan. Back at the University of Peshawar, he was promoted to assistant professor (1992–1995), associate professor (1995–2002), professor (2009), and tenured professor (2009–2016).

== Professional Activities and Award ==
Tahir Shah received the Gold Medal of the Pakistan Academy of Sciences for his research in 2005. The Pakistan Book Foundation granted him the Earth Scientist of the Year award for his publications in the Earth Sciences in 1994–95. He has been awarded the Productivity Award for his international papers for the years 2003–2005 and 2009–2013. He is listed in the directory Productive Scientists of Pakistan published by the Pakistan Council of Science and Technology from 2011 to 2014. He also received the Star Laureate award and Zafar H. Zaidi Gold Medal for 2006 from South Asia Publications (SAP).

He is a member of the Board of Faculty of the University of Swabi, the Board of Directors of the Khyber Pakhtunkhwa Oil and Gas Company (Ltd), and the Board of Governors of the Centre of Excellence in Mineralogy at the University of Balochistan. Shah was a member of the Ph.D. Review Committee and the National Curriculum Revision Committee of the HEC. He is the chief editor of the HEC-recognized Journal of Himalayan Earth Sciences and the sub-editor of the Journal of Science & Technology, University of Peshawar. Shah was awarded the prestigious Fulbright (1999–2000) and Commonwealth (2000–2001) postdoctoral fellowships and carried out postdoctoral research at the University of Nevada and the University of Leicester. He served as the senior vice president of the National Geological Society of Pakistan (2006–2008).
