= Wari, Central Dir =

Wari
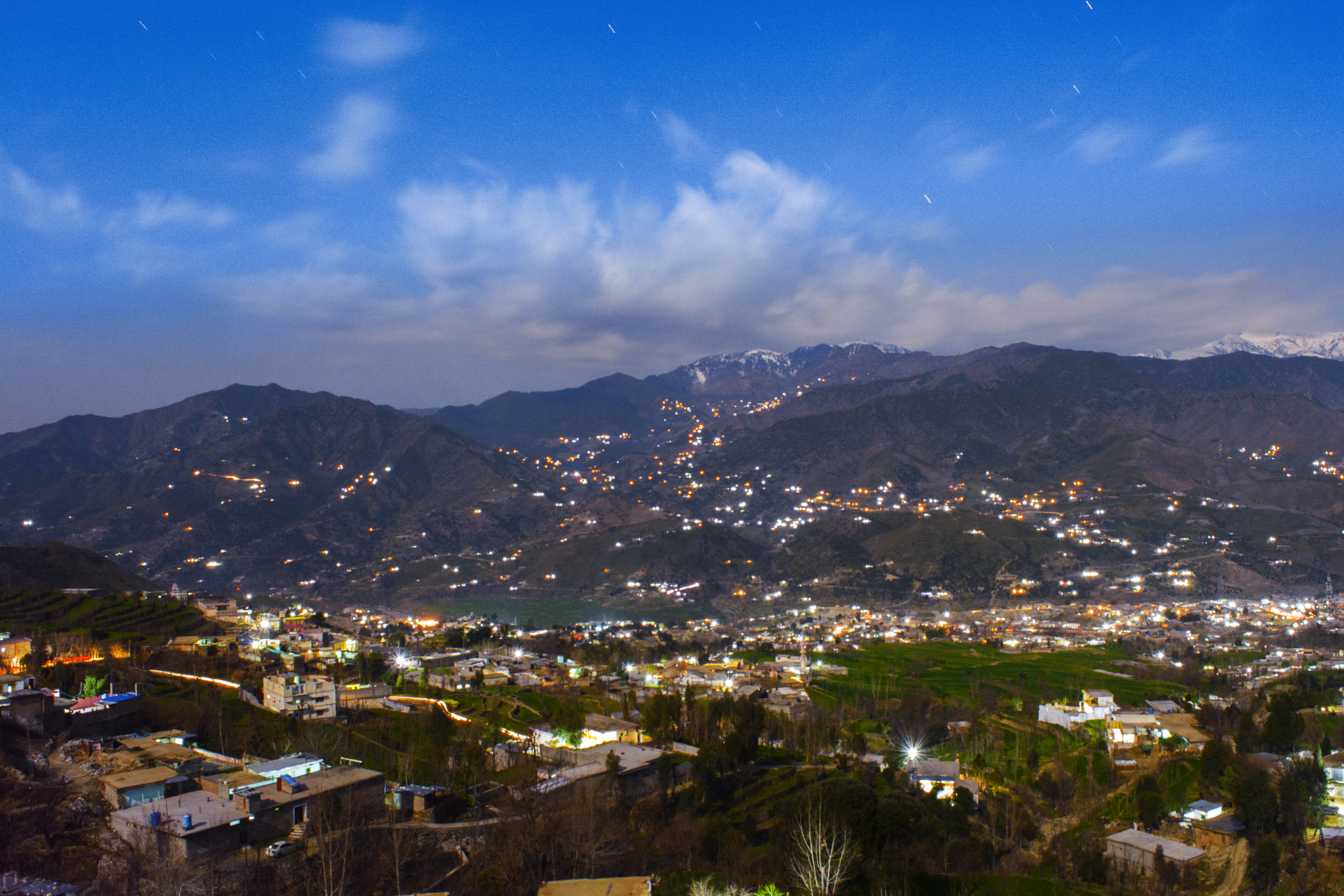
- Country: Pakistan
- Province: Khyber Pakhtunkhwa
- District: Central Dir
- Tehsil: Wari Tehsil
- Time zone: UTC+5 (PST)
- Postal code: 18200

Wari is a town and the district headquarters of Central Dir District, in the Khyber Pakhtunkhwa province of Pakistan. It is governed by a Union Council.

== See also ==
- Upper Dir District
