= Central Dir District =

Central Dir District ضلع دیر وسطی منځني دير ولسوالۍ
- District of Khyber Pakhtunkhwa
- Country: Pakistan
- Province: Khyber Pakhtunkhwa
- Division: Malakand Division
- Established: January, 23 2023
- Founder: K.P.K Government
- Headquarters: Wari City (Permanent)

Area
  - Total: 1,483 km^{2} (573 sq mi)

Population (2017)
  - Total: 595,227
  - Density: 401.4/km^{2} (1,040/sq mi)

Literacy
  - Literacy rate: Total: 48.26%; Male: 63.50%; Female: 33.58%
- Time zone: UTC+5 (PKT)
- Calling code: 0945

Central Dir District is a district in the Malakand Division of Khyber Pakhtunkhwa province, Pakistan. It was created as a separate district on 23 January 2022 by the Government of Khyber Pakhtunkhwa from the Upper Dir district.

Larjum and Wari are old tehsils, while Akhagram Karo, Nehag Dara and Sahib Abad were created along with the new district.

== Administrative divisions ==
The district consists of five tehsils:

Tehsil	Area (km²)	Pop. (2023)	Density (ppl/km²) (2023)	Literacy rate (2023)	Union Councils
Lar Jam Tehsil	1,039	119,396	114.91	52.59%	...
Wari Tehsil	508	369,147	726.67	48.56%	...
Akhagram Karo	...	...	...	...	...
Nehag Dara	...	...	...	...	...
Sahib Abad	...	...	...	...	...

== See also ==
- List of tehsils of Khyber Pakhtunkhwa by literacy rate
- Tehsils in Pakistan
  - Tehsils of Khyber Pakhtunkhwa
- Districts of Pakistan
  - Districts of Khyber Pakhtunkhwa
- Divisions of Pakistan
  - Divisions of Khyber Pakhtunkhwa
