= FATA University =

- فاٹا یونیورسٹی; فاټا پوهنتون
- Type: Public
- Established: 2016
- Chancellor: Governor of Khyber Pakhtunkhwa
- Vice-Chancellor: Alamzeb Aamir
- Location: Akhorwal, Tribal Sub-Division Darra Adam Khel, Kohat, Khyber Pakhtunkhwa, Pakistan
- Website: www.fu.edu.pk

FATA University (Urdu: فاٹا یونیورسٹی; Pashto: فاټا پوهنتون) is a public sector university situated in Akhorwal, Tribal Sub-Division Darra Adam Khel, Kohat, Khyber Pakhtunkhwa, Pakistan. The university is run by the Higher Education Department, Government of Khyber Pakhtunkhwa.

== History ==
The university was approved by Pakistan's caretaker Prime Minister Mir Hazar Khan Khoso in May 2013. It is the first-ever university in the Federally Administered Tribal Areas. Classes commenced on October 24, 2016, under the direction of Mohammad Tahir Shah, former professor of geology at University of Peshawar.

In May 2017, the FATA Students Organization asked the federal government to investigate allegations of corruption and irregularities at FATA university regarding official nepotism.

== Campus ==
FATA University is temporarily located within a portion of the Government Degree College Dara Adam Khel on the Indus Valley Highway from Peshawar to Kohat. A new campus is currently under construction in Akhorwal on an area of 58.25 acres. The university plans to open sub-campuses at Khar, Miran Shah, and Parachinar in addition to the current Akhorwal campus.

== Academics ==
The university currently offers courses in management science, mathematics, sociology and also political science.

== See also ==
- University of Peshawar
- Universities in Pakistan
