= Government of the Federally Administered Tribal Areas =

The government of the Federally Administered Tribal Areas was the system by which the former Federally Administered Tribal Areas (FATA) of Pakistan were governed, until its merger with the neighbouring Khyber Pakhtunkhwa province. The semi-autonomous region was controlled by the federal government of Pakistan through the Governor of Khyber Pakhtunkhwa. The Constitution of Pakistan contained special provisions for governing FATA, together with the colonial-era Frontier Crimes Regulations (FCR). According to the now–repealed Article 247 of the Constitution of Pakistan, the FATA region was outside the jurisdiction of the Supreme Court of Pakistan, the provincial High Courts or indeed the Provincial Assembly of Khyber Pakhtunkhwa.

== Historical Constitutional Status of FATA ==
Before 25th Amendment to Constitution of Pakistan, FATA was federally administrated special territory of Pakistan and was included among the territories of Pakistan in Article 1. FATA was governed primarily through the Frontier Crimes Regulation 1901. It was administered directly by Governor of the Khyber Pakhtunkhwa (KP) in his capacity as an agent to the President of Pakistan, under the overall supervision of the Ministry of States and Frontier Regions in Islamabad.

Laws framed by the Parliament did not apply there, unless were ordered by the President, who was also empowered to issue regulations for the peace and good government of the tribal areas.

== Representation in Parliament ==
People of FATA were represented in the Parliament of Pakistan by their elected representatives both in the National Assembly of Pakistan and the Senate of Pakistan. FATA had 12 members in the National Assembly and 8 members in the Senate. FATA had no representation in the Provincial Assembly of Khyber-Pakhtunkhwa.

== FATA Secretariat ==
Decisions related to development planning in tribal areas were taken by the FATA section of the KP Planning and Development Department, and implemented by KP Government. The FATA Secretariat was set up in 2002, headed by the Secretary FATA. Four years later, in 2006, the Civil Secretariat of FATA was established to take over decision-making functions.

=== Departments ===
The six departments of now-defunct FATA Secretariat were as follows:

1. Administration, Infrastructure & Coordination Department
2. Finance Department
3. Law & Order Department
4. Planning & Development Department
5. Production & Livelihood Development Department
6. Social Sectors Department

=== Directorates ===
In addition to departments following directorates:

- Health
- Education
- Forestry
- Fisheries
- Irrigation
- Livestock & Dairy Development
- Minerals & Technical Education
- Agriculture
- Sports
- Social Welfare
- Roads and other infrastructure development

== Political Agents ==
Each Agencies of the Federally Administered Tribal Areas was administered by a Political Agent (PA), assisted by a number of Assistant Political Agents (APA), Tehsildars (administrative head of a tehsil) and Naib Tehsildars (deputy tehsildar).

== The Judicial System ==
All civil and criminal cases in FATA were decided under the Frontier Crimes Regulation 1901 by a jirga (council of elders). Residents of tribal areas had, however, right to approach the FATA Tribunal challenging a decision issued under the 1901 Regulation.

== Merger with KP ==
The FATA was merged into province of Khyber Pakhtunkhwa by Parliament thorough the 25th Amendment to Constitution of Pakistan that was approved in 2018. Under the 25th Amendment the following changes took effect:

- FCR was repealed and replaced with the new Rewaj Regulation for Tribal Areas
- Party-based Provincial Government elections were held for the first time in erstwhile-Fata in July 2019.
- Jurisdiction of the Supreme Court of Pakistan and the Peshawar High Court was extended to erstwhile-Fata.
- Ex-Fata elected their own representatives to the K-P Assembly.

== See also ==
- Frontier Crimes Regulation
- Economy of the Federally Administered Tribal Areas
- FATA Development Authority
- FATA Disaster Management Authority
- Tribal Electric Supply Company
