= Paharpur Tehsil =

Paharpur Tehsil تحصیل پہاڑ پور پهاړ پور تحصیل
- Tehsil
- Country: Pakistan
- Province: Khyber Pakhtunkhwa
- District: Paharpur
- Seat: Paharpur

Government
  - Chairman: Makhdoom Altaf Hussain Shah (PPP)

Population (2023)
  - Tehsil: 406,467
  - Urban: 87,696
  - Rural: 318,771
- Time zone: UTC+5 (PST)
- Number of towns: 1
- Number of Union Councils: 12

Paharpur Tehsil is a tehsil of Paharpur District, Khyber Pakhtunkhwa, Pakistan.

The tehsil is administratively subdivided into 18 union councils with its headquarters at the town of Paharpur.

== See also ==
- Paniala Tehsil
