= Oghi =

Oghi may refer to:

- Oghi, Pakistan, a town in Pakistan
  - Oghi Tehsil, the larger administrative unit
- Oghi (drink), an Armenian alcoholic beverage
