= Federally Administered Tribal Areas =

1947–2018 semi-autonomous region in Pakistan

Federally Administered Tribal Areas وفاقی قبائلی علاقہ جات فدرالي قبايلي سيمې
- Former Territory of Pakistan
- 1947–2018
- Flag Coat of arms

- Former Location of the Federally Administered Tribal Areas
- Area
  - 2017: 27,220 km^{2} (10,510 sq mi)
- History
  - Established: 14 August 1947
  - Merged into Khyber Pakthunkhwa: 31 May 2018
Preceded by	Succeeded by
British Administrated Tribal Areas	Khyber Pakhtunkhwa
- Today part of: Khyber Pakhtunkhwa

The Federally Administered Tribal Areas (FATA) (Note: Pashto: فدرالي قبايلي سيمې; Urdu: وفاق کے زیر انتظام قبائلی علاقہ جات) was a semi-autonomous tribal region in north-western Pakistan that existed from 1947 until being merged with the neighbouring province of Khyber Pakhtunkhwa in 2018 through the Twenty-fifth amendment to the constitution of Pakistan. It consisted of seven tribal agencies (districts) and six frontier regions, and were directly governed by the federal government through a special set of laws called the Frontier Crimes Regulations.

On 24 May 2018, the National Assembly of Pakistan voted in favour of an amendment to the Constitution of Pakistan for the FATA-KP merger which was approved by the Senate the following day. Since the change was to affect the province of Khyber Pakhtunkhwa, it was presented for approval in the Khyber Pakhtunkhwa Assembly on 27 May 2018, and passed with majority vote. On 28 May 2018, the President of Pakistan signed the FATA Interim Governance Regulation, a set of interim rules for FATA until it merges with Khyber Pakhtunkhwa within a timeframe of two years. The 25th Amendment received assent from President Mamnoon Hussain on 31 May 2018, after which FATA was officially merged with Khyber Pakhtunkhwa.

== History ==
=== Colonial period ===
Although the British never succeeded in completely calming unrest in the region, it served as a buffer from unrest in Afghanistan. The British Colonial Government attempted to control the population of the annexed tribal regions with the Frontier Crimes Regulations (FCR), which granted large amounts of power to local leaders along the North-West Frontier as part of the process of indirect rule. Due to "the extremely harsh, inhuman and discriminatory provisions" contained within the FCR, the legislation came to be known as the "black law."

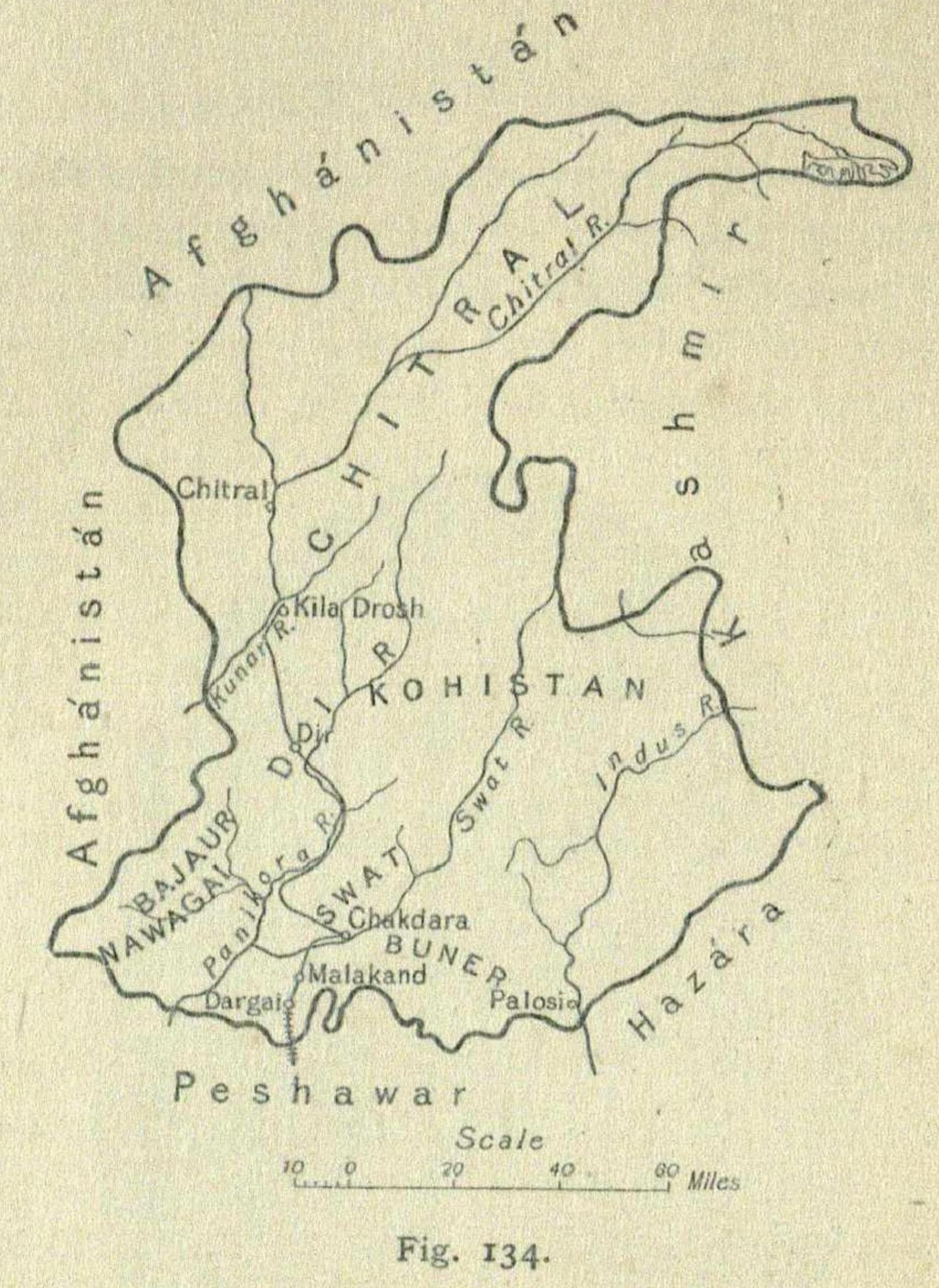
Map of Tribal Territory north of Peshawar district of the North-West Frontier Province (1916)

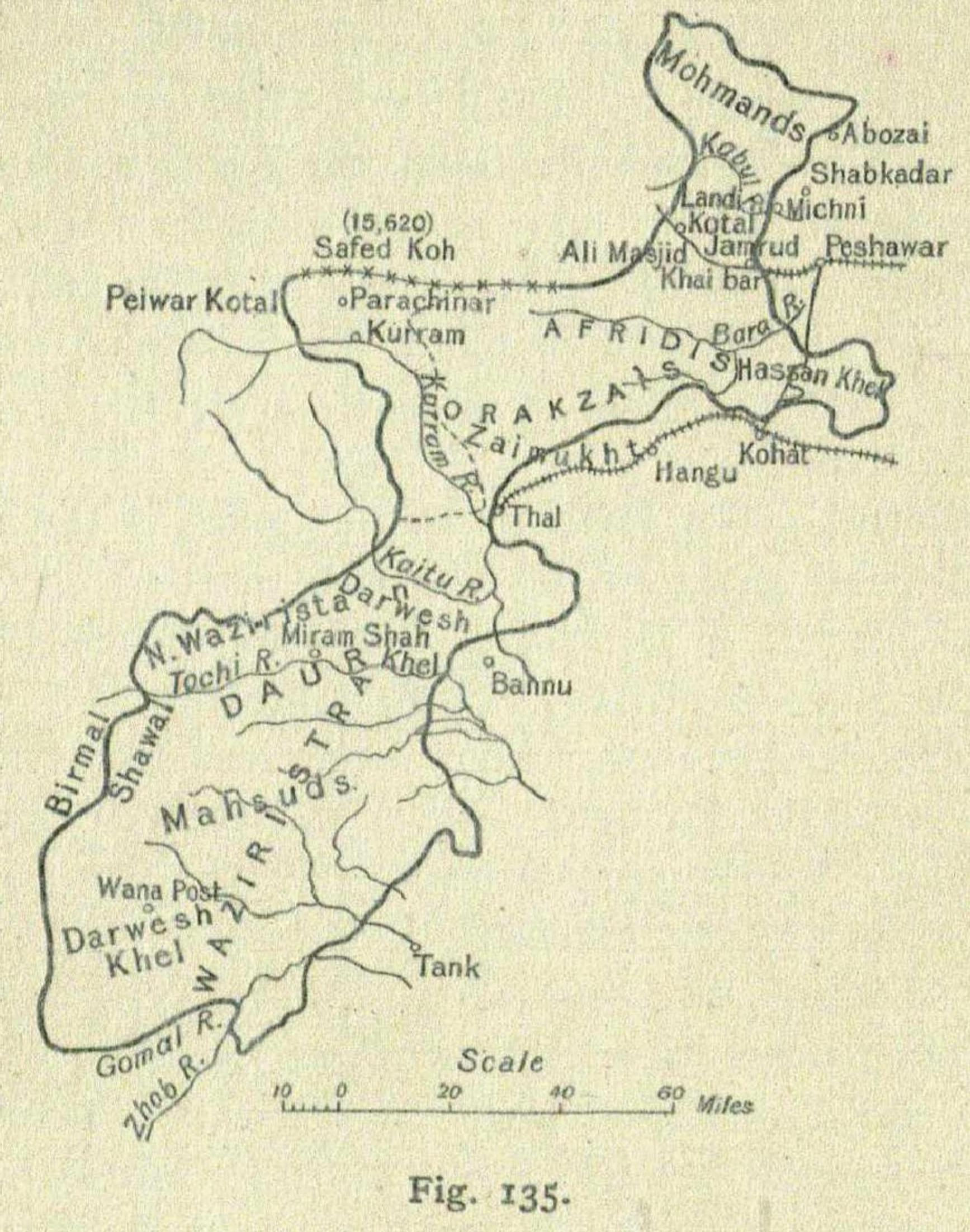
Map of Tribal Territory in the western part of the North-West Frontier Province (1916)

=== After independence ===
The annexed areas continued to be governed through the Frontier Crimes Regulations after the creation of Pakistan in 1947, by the Dominion of Pakistan in 1947, and into the Islamic Republic of Pakistan in 1956.

According to the United States Institute of Peace, the character of the region underwent a shift beginning in the 1980s. Mujahideen entered to fight against the jirgas as allies of the CIA Operation Cyclone; both were opposed to forces of the Soviet Union prior to the fall of the Berlin Wall and collapse of Soviet Union.

In 2001, the Tehrik-e-Taliban militants began entering into the region. In 2003, Taliban forces sheltered in the Federally Administered Tribal Areas began crossing the border into Afghanistan, attacking military and police after the United States invasion. Shkin, Afghanistan was a key location for these frequent battles. This heavily fortified military base housed mostly American special operations forces since 2002 and is located six kilometers from the Pakistani border. It is considered the most dangerous location in Afghanistan.

Since the September 11 attacks in the United States of 2001, the tribal areas were a major theatre of militancy and terrorism. The Pakistan Army launched 10 operations against the Pakistani Taliban since 2001, notably the Operation Zarb-e-Azb in North Waziristan. The operations displaced about two million people from the tribal areas, as schools, hospitals, and homes have been destroyed in the war.

With the encouragement of the United States, 80,000 Pakistani troops entered the Federally Administered Tribal Areas in March 2004 to search for al-Qaeda operatives, meeting with fierce resistance from Pakistani Taliban. It was not the elders, but the Pakistani Taliban who negotiated a truce with the army, an indication of the extent to which the Pakistani Taliban had taken control. Troops entered the region, into South Waziristan and North Waziristan, eight more times between 2004 and 2006, and faced further Pakistani Taliban resistance. Peace accords entered into in 2004 and 2006 set terms whereby the tribesmen in the area would stop attacking Afghanistan, and the Pakistanis would halt major military actions against the Federally Administered Tribal Areas, release all prisoners, and permit tribesmen to carry small guns.

On 4 June 2007, the National Security Council of Pakistan met to decide the fate of Waziristan and take up a number of political and administrative decisions to control "Talibanization" of the area. The meeting was chaired by President Pervez Musharraf and it was attended by the Chief Ministers and Governors of all four provinces. They discussed the deteriorating law and order situation and the threat posed to state security. To crush the armed militancy in the Tribal regions and Khyber-Pakhtunkhwa, the government decided to intensify and reinforce law enforcement and military activity, take action against certain madrasas, and jam illegal FM radio stations.

=== Merger with Khyber Pakhtunkhwa ===
On 2 March 2017, the federal government considered a proposal to merge the tribal areas with Khyber Pakhtunkhwa, and to repeal the Frontier Crimes Regulations. However, some political parties opposed the merger, and called for the tribal areas to instead become a separate province of Pakistan.

The proposed merger was near finalized at a meeting presided over by President Mamnoon Hussain at the Presidency in January 2017. The Prime Minister gave approval after discussing the issue with all the stakeholders. By March 2017, the federal cabinet approved the merger of FATA with Khyber Pakhtunkhwa and other reforms.

==== National Implementation Committee on FATA Reforms ====
On 18 December 2017, the National Implementation Committee (NIC) on FATA Reforms, chaired by Prime Minister Shahid Khaqan Abbasi, endorsed the FATA-Khyber Pakhtunkhwa merger and agreed to let FATA elect 23 members to the Khyber Pakhtunkhwa Assembly in the July 2018 general elections. The NIC also decided to remove controversial sections of the Frontier Crimes Regulations and to allow colonial-era regulation to continue with a sunset clause to be replaced entirely once a proper judicial system is in place in the tribal region.

==== Constitutional amendment ====
On 24 May 2018, the National Assembly of Pakistan passed a bill to enact the Twenty-fifth Amendment to the Constitution of Pakistan which called for the merger of FATA with the province of Khyber Pakhtunkhwa. The vote was 229–1 in favor of the amendment. Jamiat Ulema-e-Islam-Fazal and Pakhtunkhwa Milli Awami Party lawmakers walked out from the assembly ahead of the vote. The sole dissenter was Dawar Kundi of the PTI.

On 25 May 2018, the Twenty-fifth Amendment to the Constitution of Pakistan was passed with a majority in the Senate of Pakistan. A total of 69 votes was needed for the bill to be approved; the vote was 71–5 in favor of the amendment for FATA, K-P merger.

On 27 May 2018, the Thirty-first Amendment to the Constitution of Pakistan was passed with a majority in the Khyber Pakhtunkhwa Assembly. A total of 83 votes was needed for the bill to be approved, the vote was an 87–7 in favor of the amendment for FATA, K-P merger.

=== Qabailistan proposal ===
Parliamentarians from tribal areas took strong exception to a resolution adopted by the Khyber Pakhtunkhwa assembly asking for merger of the Federally Administered Tribal Areas with their province. The Awami National Party also made similar demands that the FATA be merged with Khyber Pakhtunkhwa. These proposals were opposed by tribal parliamentarians in Islamabad. The name Qabailistan was proposed for FATA as a new province separate from Khyber Pakhtunkhwa. The Qabailistan proposal never got any traction and was dropped in favor of merging FATA into Khyber Pakhtunkhwa province.

== Geography ==
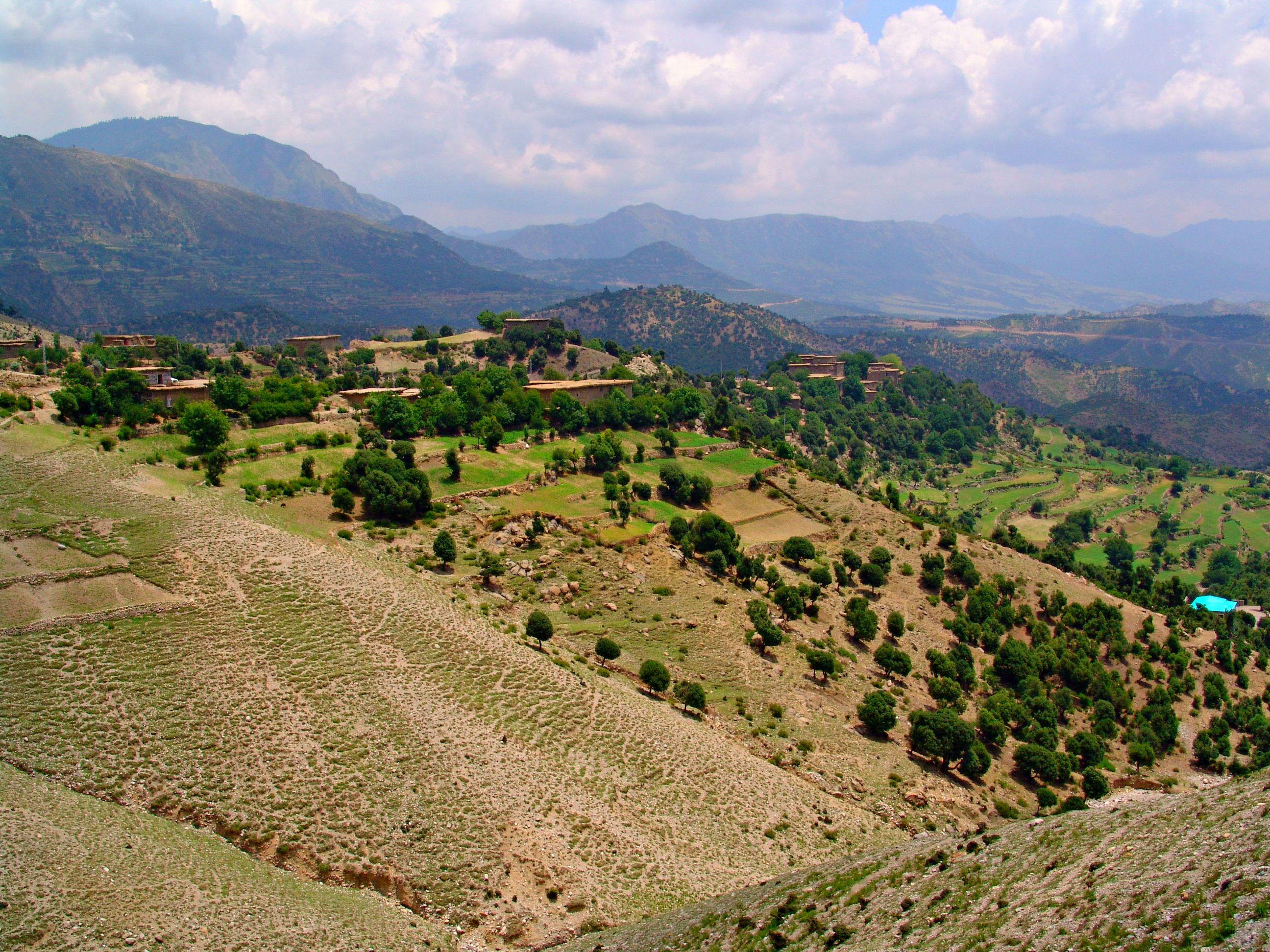
Tari Mangal in the Kurram District

The Federally Administered Tribal Areas were bordered by Afghanistan to the north and west, Khyber Pakhtunkhwa to the east, and Balochistan to the south.

The seven Tribal Areas laid in a north-to-south strip adjacent to the west side of the six Frontier Regions. The geographical arrangement of the seven Tribal Areas in order from north to south was: Bajaur, Mohmand, Khyber, Orakzai, Kurram, North Waziristan, South Waziristan. The geographical arrangement of the six Frontier Regions in order from north to south was: FR Peshawar, FR Kohat, FR Bannu, FR Lakki Marwat, FR Tank, FR Dera Ismail Khan.

== Demographics ==
Historical population
Year	Pop.	±% p.a.
1901	74,756	—
1911	1,622,094	+36.03%
1921	2,825,136	+5.71%
1931	2,259,288	−2.21%
1941	2,377,599	+0.51%
1951	1,332,005	−5.63%
1961	1,847,195	+3.32%
1972	2,491,230	+2.76%
1981	2,198,547	−1.38%
1998	2,746,490	+1.32%
2017	5,001,676	+3.21%

The total population of the Federally Administered Tribal Areas was estimated in 2000 to be about 3,341,080 people, or roughly 2% of Pakistan's population. Only 3.1% of the population resides in established townships. According to 2011 estimates FATA gained 62.1% population over its 1998 figures, totaling up to 4,452,913. This was the fourth-highest increase in population of any province, after that of Balochistan, Sindh and Gilgit-Baltistan.

=== Languages ===
Languages of Federally Administered Tribal Areas (2017 Census of Pakistan)
Pashto	98.4%
Urdu	0.49%
Punjabi	0.28%
Sindhi	0.10%
Balochi	0.08%

According to the 2017 census of Pakistan, 98.4% of the population of FATA had Pashto as mother tongue, followed by 0.49% Urdu, 0.28% Punjabi, 0.10% Sindhi and 0.08% spoke Balochi.

=== Religions ===
Religions in the Federally Administered Tribal Areas
Religion	Percent
Islam	99.6%
Others†	0.4%
Distribution of religions †Includes Sikhs, Parsis, Hindus, Christian .

Over 99.6% of the population was Muslim belonging to the Sunni Hanafi Fiqh.

According to a report by the government of Pakistan there were around 50,000 religious minority members living in former FATA region. These included 20,000 Sikhs, 20,000 Christians and 10,000 Hindus.

== Government and politics ==
=== Democracy and parliamentary representation ===
In 1996, the Government of Pakistan finally granted the Federally Administered Tribal Areas the long requested "adult franchise", under which every adult would have the right to vote for their own representatives in the Parliament of Pakistan. The Federally Administered Tribal Areas were not allowed to organize political parties. Islamist candidates were able to campaign through mosques and madrasas, as a result of which mullahs were elected to represent the Federally Administered Tribal Areas in the National Assembly in 1997 and 2002. This was a departure from prior tribal politics, where power was focused in the hands of secular authorities, Maliks.

=== Women and elections ===
All of the FATA's adults were legally allowed to vote in the Majlis-e-Shoora of Pakistan under the "adult franchise" granted in 1996. Stephen Tierney, in Accommodating National Identity, reported that women came out to do so in the thousands for the 1997 office, possibly motivated by competition for voter numbers among the tribes. However, Ian Talbot in Pakistan, a Modern History states that elders and religious leaders attempted to prevent female participation by threatening punishment against tribesmen whose women registered, leading to under-registration in the female population. In 2008, the Taliban ordered women in the FATA regions of Bajaur, Kurram and Mohmand against voting under threat of "serious punishment", while Mangal Bagh, chief of the Lashkar-e-Islam, forbade women to vote in the Jamrud and Bara subdivisions of the Khyber Agency.

=== Administration ===
The region was controlled by the Federal government of Pakistan for more than seventy years until its merger with Khyber Pakhtunkhwa. On behalf of the President, the Governor of Khyber Pakhtunkhwa (formerly NWFP) used to exercise the federal authority in the context of the Federally Administered Tribal Areas.

The Constitution of Pakistan had special provisions to rule the FATA. The rules which were framed by the British in 1901 as Frontier Crimes Regulations (FCR) also continued to operate. According to now repealed Article 247 of Constitution of Pakistan, The Jurisdiction of the Supreme Court of Pakistan and any of the High Court of Pakistan did not extend to FATA and Provincially Administered Tribal Areas (PATA). The Khyber-Pakhtunkhwa Provincial Assembly had no power in FATA, and can exercise its powers in PATA only for that which was part of Khyber-Pakhtunkhwa.

The Pashtun tribes who inhabit the areas were semi-autonomous, with cordial relations with the Pakistan government.

=== Relations with the Pakistani military ===
In 2001, the Pakistani military entered the Federally Administered Tribal Areas for the first time which was previously governed by Frontier Corps. In 2010, The New America Foundation and Terror Free Tomorrow conducted the first comprehensive public opinion survey in the Federally Administered Tribal Areas. The results showed that, on the issue of fighting militancy in the region, the people of the Federally Administered Tribal Areas overwhelmingly support the Pakistani military. Nearly 70 percent back the Pakistani military pursuing Al-Qaeda and Taliban fighters in the Tribal Areas. According to a survey, when asked how the Federally Administered Tribal Areas should be governed, 79 percent said it should be governed by the Pakistani military.

In 2014, about 929,859 people were reported to be internally displaced from North Waziristan as a result of Operation Zarb-e-Azb, a military offensive conducted by the Pakistan Armed Forces along the Durand Line.

=== Administrative divisions ===
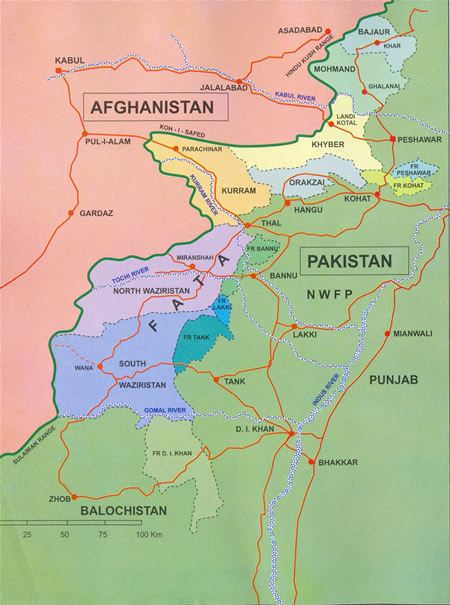
Federally Administered Tribal Areas (FATA)

The Federally Administered Tribal Areas (FATA) consisted of two types of areas, the Tribal Agencies, and Frontier Regions. There were seven Tribal Agencies and six Frontier Regions.

==== Tribal Agencies ====
The Tribal Agencies were further divided into Subdivisions, and Tehsils. According to the Election Commission of Pakistan, the Federally Administered Tribal Areas consisted of the following subdivisions and tehsils:

Agency / FR	Subdivision	Tehsil
Bajaur Agency	Khaar	Khara Bajaur
Bajaur Agency	Khaar	Utman Khel
Bajaur Agency	Khaar	Salarzai
Bajaur Agency	Nawagai	Nawagai
Bajaur Agency	Nawagai	Mamund
Bajaur Agency	Nawagai	Barang
Bajaur Agency	Nawagai	Bar Chamarkand
Mohmand Agency	Lower Mohmand	Yake Ghund
Mohmand Agency	Lower Mohmand	Ambar Utman Khel
Mohmand Agency	Lower Mohmand	Pindiali
Mohmand Agency	Lower Mohmand	Prang Ghar Utmankhel
Mohmand Agency	Upper Mohmand	Safi
Mohmand Agency	Upper Mohmand	Upper Mohmand
Mohmand Agency	Upper Mohmand	Halim Zai
Khyber Agency	Jamrud	Jamrud
Khyber Agency	Jamrud	Mula Gori
Khyber Agency	Landi Kotal	Landi Kotal
Khyber Agency	Bara	Bara
Orakzai Agency	Lower Orakzai	Lower
Orakzai Agency	Lower Orakzai	Central
Orakzai Agency	Upper Orakzai	Ismail Zai
Orakzai Agency	Upper Orakzai	Upper
Kurram Agency	Lower Kurram	Lower Kurram
Kurram Agency	Central Kurram	Central Kurram F.R.
Kurram Agency	Upper Kurram	Upper Kurram
North Waziristan Agency	Mirali	Mir Ali
North Waziristan Agency	Mirali	Spinwam
North Waziristan Agency	Mirali	Shewa
North Waziristan Agency	Miramshah	Miran Shah
North Waziristan Agency	Miramshah	Datta Khel
North Waziristan Agency	Miramshah	Ghulam Khan
North Waziristan Agency	Razmak	Razmak
North Waziristan Agency	Razmak	Dossali
North Waziristan Agency	Razmak	Gharyum
South Waziristan Agency	Ladha	Ladha
South Waziristan Agency	Ladha	Makin
South Waziristan Agency	Ladha	Sararogha
South Waziristan Agency	Sarwakai	Serwekai
South Waziristan Agency	Sarwakai	Tiarza
South Waziristan Agency	Wanna	Wana
South Waziristan Agency	Wanna	Birmil
South Waziristan Agency	Wanna	Toi Khullah

==== Frontier Regions ====
The Frontier Regions were named after their adjacent settled Districts in Khyber-Pakhtunkhwa. The administration of the FR was carried out by the DCO / DC of the neighbouring named district. The overall administration of the frontier regions was carried out by the FATA Secretariat, based in Peshawar and reporting to the Governor of Khyber-Pakhtunkhwa. The six regions were:

- Frontier Region Bannu
- Frontier Region Dera Ismail Khan
- Frontier Region Kohat
- Frontier Region Lakki Marwat
- Frontier Region Peshawar
- Frontier Region Tank

== Economy ==
The Former FATA region was amongst the most impoverished parts of the nation. Despite being home to 2.4% of Pakistan's population, it made up only 1.5% of Pakistan's economy with a per capita income of only $663 in 2010 only 34% of households managed to rise above the poverty level.

Due to the Former FATA region's tribal organization, the economy was chiefly pastoral, with some agriculture practiced in the region's few fertile valleys. Its total irrigated land was roughly 1,000 square kilometres. The region was a major center for opium trafficking, as well the smuggling of other contraband.

Foreign aid to the region was a difficult proposition, according to Craig Cohen, an analyst at the Center for Strategic and International Studies in Washington, D.C. Since security is difficult, local nongovernmental organizations were required to distribute aid, but there was a lack of trust amongst NGOs and other powers that hampered distribution. Pakistani NGOs were often targets of violent attacks by Islamist militants in the Former FATA region. Due to the extensive hostility to any hint of foreign influence, the American branch of Save the Children was distributing funding anonymously in the region as of July 2007. The concept of setting up Reconstruction Opportunity Zones (ROZs) in the former FATA region and Afghanistan was an element in the United States Government's counter-terrorism and regional economic integration strategies.

== Social issues ==
=== Health ===
There was one hospital bed for every 2,179 people in the former FATA region, compared to one in 1,341 in Pakistan as a whole. There was one doctor for every 7,670 people compared to one doctor per 1,226 people in Pakistan as a whole. 43% of the former FATA region's citizens had access to clean drinking water. Much of the population is suspicious about modern medicine, and some militant groups are openly hostile to vaccinations.

In June 2007, a Pakistani doctor was blown up in his car "after trying to counter the anti-vaccine propaganda of an imam in Bajaur", Pakistani officials told The New York Times.

=== Education ===
The Former FATA region had a total of 6,050 government education institutions out of which 4,868 were functional. Out of these 4,868 functional institutions, 77 percent (3,729) were primary schools. Total enrolment in government institutions was 612,556 out of which 69 percent were studying at primary stage. Total number of working teachers in FATA was 22,610 out of which 7,540 were female. The survival rate from Grade KG to Grade 5 was 36 percent while the transition rate from primary to middle in public schools in Ex-FATA was 64 percent (73 percent for boys and 45 percent for girls).

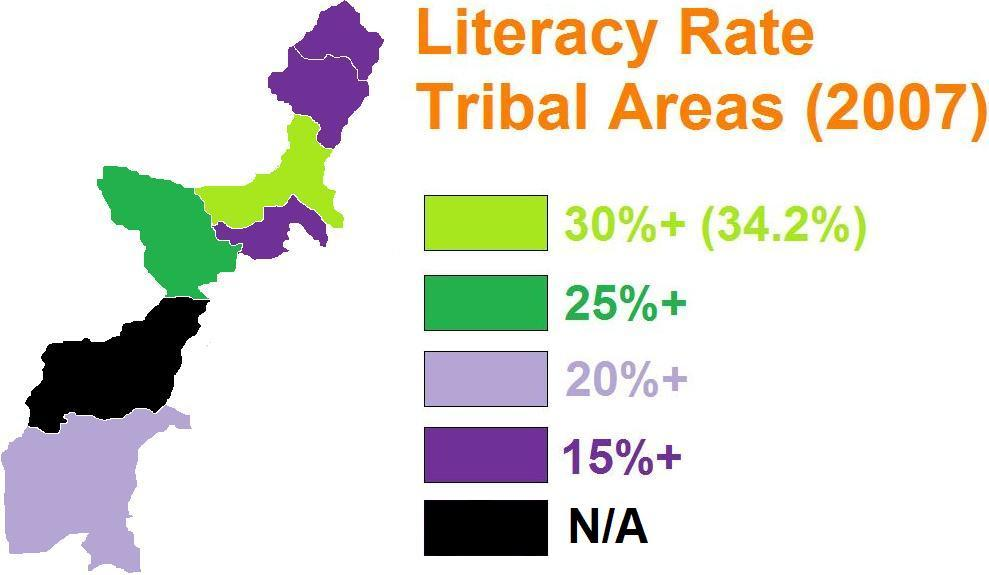
Literacy Map of FATA (2007).

The Former FATA region has one university, FATA University in Akhurwal, Darra Adam Khel, FR Kohat, which was approved by Mir Hazar Khan Khoso in May 2013. Classes commenced on 24 October 2016, under the direction of Dr. Mohammad Tahir Shah, former professor of geology at University of Peshawar. The university plans to open sub-campuses at Khar, Miran Shah, and Parachinar.

The Former FATA region's literacy rate is 22%, which is well below the nationwide rate of 56%. 35.8% of men, and only 7.5% of women received education, compared to a nationwide 44% of women.

Agency	Literacy rate 2007		
Agency	Male	Female	Total
Khyber	57.2%	10.1%	34.2%
Kurram	37.9%	14.4%	26.5%
South Waziristan	32.3%	4.3%	20%
Orakzai	29.5%	3.4%	17%
Mohmand	28.5%	3.5%	16.6%
Bajaur Agency	27.9%	3.1%	16.5%
North Waziristan (1998)	26.77%	1.47%	15.88%

== Sports ==
FATA was home to the former domestic cricket team FATA Cheetahs. The Federally Administered Tribal Areas cricket team gained first class status in 2015.

== See also ==
- Administrative System of the FATA
- Economy of the Federally Administered Tribal Areas
- Frontier Regions
- Provincially Administered Tribal Areas (PATA)
- Twenty-fifth Amendment to the Constitution of Pakistan
