= National Centre of Excellence in Geology =

The National Centre of Excellence in Geology (NCEG), University of Peshawar, is an institution of higher learning and research in geosciences. It was established in 1974 under an act of the Pakistani parliament. The institute offers MS and Ph.D programs in Geology, Geophysics Geospatial, and Environmental Geology. The NCEG offers vast fields of study in special relation to Geology, i.e. Engineering Geology, Structural Geology, Sedimentology, Geochemistry, Mineralogy, Petrography, Quaternary Geology, Economic Geology, Hydrogeology, Environmental Geology.

== Center activities ==
According to the center, its primary goals include:

- To engage in goal-oriented high-level teaching and research,
- To train research scientists,
- To conduct M.Phil., Ph.D., and other programs (Diploma) in Earth & Environmental Sciences per the standards and requirements of the University,
- To promote cooperation and inter-disciplinary relationships with other teaching/research organizations/universities and with industry,
- To arrange conferences, seminars, workshops, and refresher courses for the development of teaching and research, and
- To conduct teaching and research in such particular disciplines as is assigned to it by the Federal Government.
