= Hassan Khel Tehsil =

Administrative unit in Khyber Pakhtunkhwa, Pakistan

Hassan Khel: حسن خیل (Urdu); حسن خېل (Pashto); Frontier Region Peshawar
- Tehsil / Subdivision
- Location within Khyber Pakhtunkhwa Location within Pakistan
- Coordinates: 33°46′37.1″N 71°42′21.8″E
- Country: Pakistan
- Province: Khyber Pakhtunkhwa
- Division: Peshawar
- District: Peshawar

Area
  - Total: 261 km^{2} (101 sq mi)

Population (2023)
  - Total: 72,557
  - Density: 278/km^{2} (720/sq mi)
- Time zone: UTC+5 (PKT)

Hassan Khel Tehsil, (Note: Urdu: تحصیل حسن خیل; Pashto: حسن خېل تحصیل) also known as Hassan Khel Subdivision, (Note: Urdu: سب ڈویژن حسن خیل; Pashto: سب ډویژن حسن خېل) is an administrative unit of Peshawar District in Khyber Pakhtunkhwa, Pakistan. It was formerly known as Frontier Region Peshawar (Note: Urdu: سرحدی علاقہ پشاور) when it was part of the Federally Administered Tribal Areas, which merged with Khyber Pakhtunkhwa in 2018. As of the 2023 Pakistani census, the population of Hassan Khel was 72,557.

Pakistani security forces in Hassan Khel have routinely engaged in border skirmishes with their Afghan counterparts and militants due to the area's relative proximity to the Pakistan–Afghanistan border.

== History ==
Hassan Khel was originally Frontier Region Peshawar of the Federally Administered Tribal Areas, an autonomous region of Pakistan that merged into Khyber Pakhtunkhwa in May 2018.

Unidentified militants exchanged fire with personnel at the Hassan Khel police station on 13 August 2025, resulting in the death of one officer and the wounding of another.

Khaisat Rehman, a police officer from Peshawar belonging to the bomb disposal unit, was killed by an improvised explosive device (IED) inside an abandoned police station in Hassan Khel on 14 July 2026. Militants had previously detonated an IED inside the building, but another one failed to explode. Rehman was killed when the remaining IED exploded during his attempt to disarm it.

On 9 June 2026, militants of the Pakistani Taliban made a failed attempt to capture a Federal Constabulary post in Hassan Khel. The militants' attack was repelled, but six members of the Federal Constabulary were killed. The next day, the Pakistani military responded by launching "precise and calibrated" strikes against militant camps along the Pakistan–Afghanistan border. Afghan authorities claimed that the strikes killed 13 civilians, including 11 children.

Pakistani authorities blamed the Afghan Taliban for a drone attack that wounded three women and two children in Hassan Khel on 1 July 2026.

== Administration and geography ==
Hassan Khel is a subdivision of Peshawar District in the province of Khyber Pakhtunkhwa, in northwest Pakistan. Administratively, it is equal in level to a tehsil (subdistrict) and is officially referred to variously as Hassan Khel Tehsil and Hassan Khel Subdivision. Hassan Khel spans an area of 261 square kilometres. The region is hilly, with average heights of over 1,000 m (3,300 ft) above sea level.

== Demographics ==
The population of Frontier District Peshawar was 53,841 as of the 1998 Pakistani census. The predominant first language was Pashto, spoken by 99.2% of the districts' inhabitants.

The 2023 Pakistani census recorded a population of 72,557 people in Hassan Khel. The average household size was 7.4 people.

== See also ==
- List of tehsils of Khyber Pakhtunkhwa
