= Paharpur District =

- District of Khyber Pakhtunkhwa
- Country: Pakistan
- Province: Khyber Pakhtunkhwa
- Division: Dera Ismail Khan
- Established: 2 October 2025
- Headquarters: Paharpur
- Tehsils of Paharpur District: 02

Government
  - Type: Government of Khyber Pakhtunkhwa
- Time zone: UTC+05:00 (PKT)
  - Summer (DST): DST is not observed
- Area code: 966

Paharpur District is a district in Khyber Pakhtunkhwa, Pakistan. It was carved out of Dera Ismail Khan District in October 2025.

== History ==
In August 2025, the KP government announced its intention to divide Dera Ismail Khan District into two parts, with a new district to be created called Paharpur, while the remaining area would retain the name Dera Ismail Khan.

On 2 October 2025, the KP cabinet formally approved the creation of Paharpur District. The decision fulfilled a long-standing demand of local residents who had been requesting district status to reduce administrative burden and gain better access to government services. The district comprised Paharpur Tehsil and Paniala Tehsil.

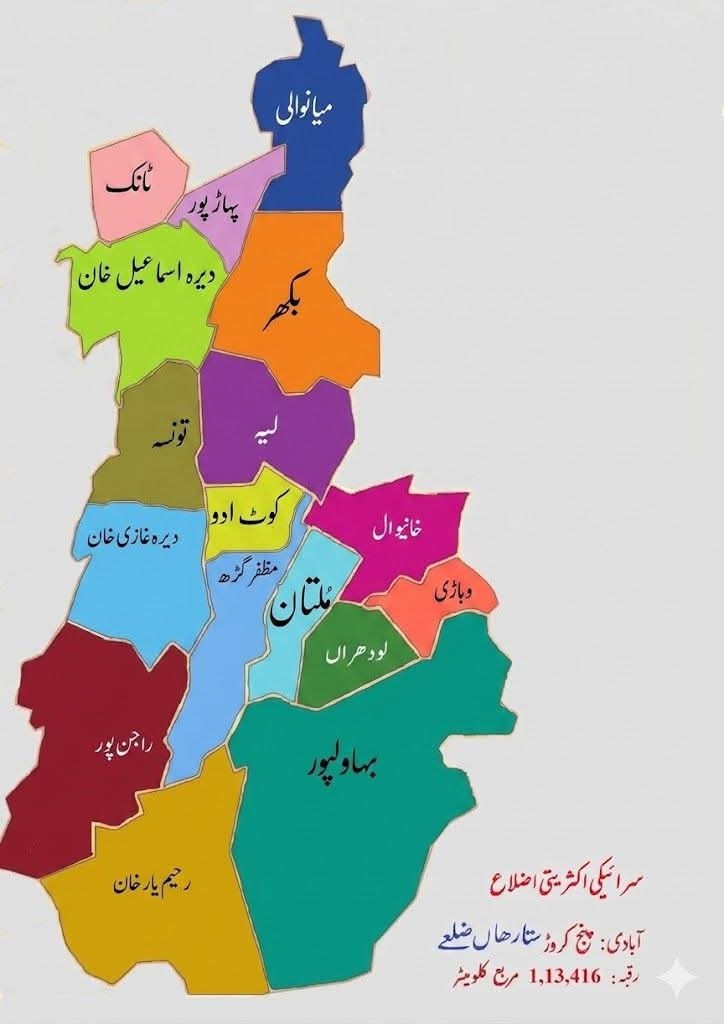
Saraikistan showing Paharpur

== Administration ==
The district is subdivided into two Tehsils:

Tehsil	Area (km²)	Pop. (2023)	Density (ppl/km²) (2023)	Literacy rate (2023)	Union Councils
Paharpur Tehsil	1,657	406,467	245.3	48.86%	
Paniala Tehsil	...	...	...	...	
