= Wari Tehsil =

Wari Tehsil تحصیل واڑی واړي تحصیل
- Tehsil
- Country: Pakistan
- Province: Khyber Pakhtunkhwa
- District: Central Dir

Government
  - Chairman: Ayyan Ullah Khan (PTI)

Population (2017)
  - Total: 321,807
- Time zone: UTC+5 (PST)

Wari (Urdu: واڑی تحصیل) is a tehsil of Central Dir District, Khyber Pakhtunkhwa, Pakistan.

It used to be a tehsil of Upper Dir District until 22 January 2023, when the KP Government established a new district Central Dir and Wari tehsil shifted to the newly established district.

== See also ==
- Upper Dir District
- Wari, Upper Dir
