= Wazir Tehsil =

Subdivision of Khyber Pakhtunkhwa, Pakistan

Coordinates: 32.56°N 70.22°E

Wazir Tehsil تحصیل گومتی ګوماتي تحصیل Frontier Region Bannu سرحدی علاقہ بنوں بنو سرحدي سیمه
- Tehsil
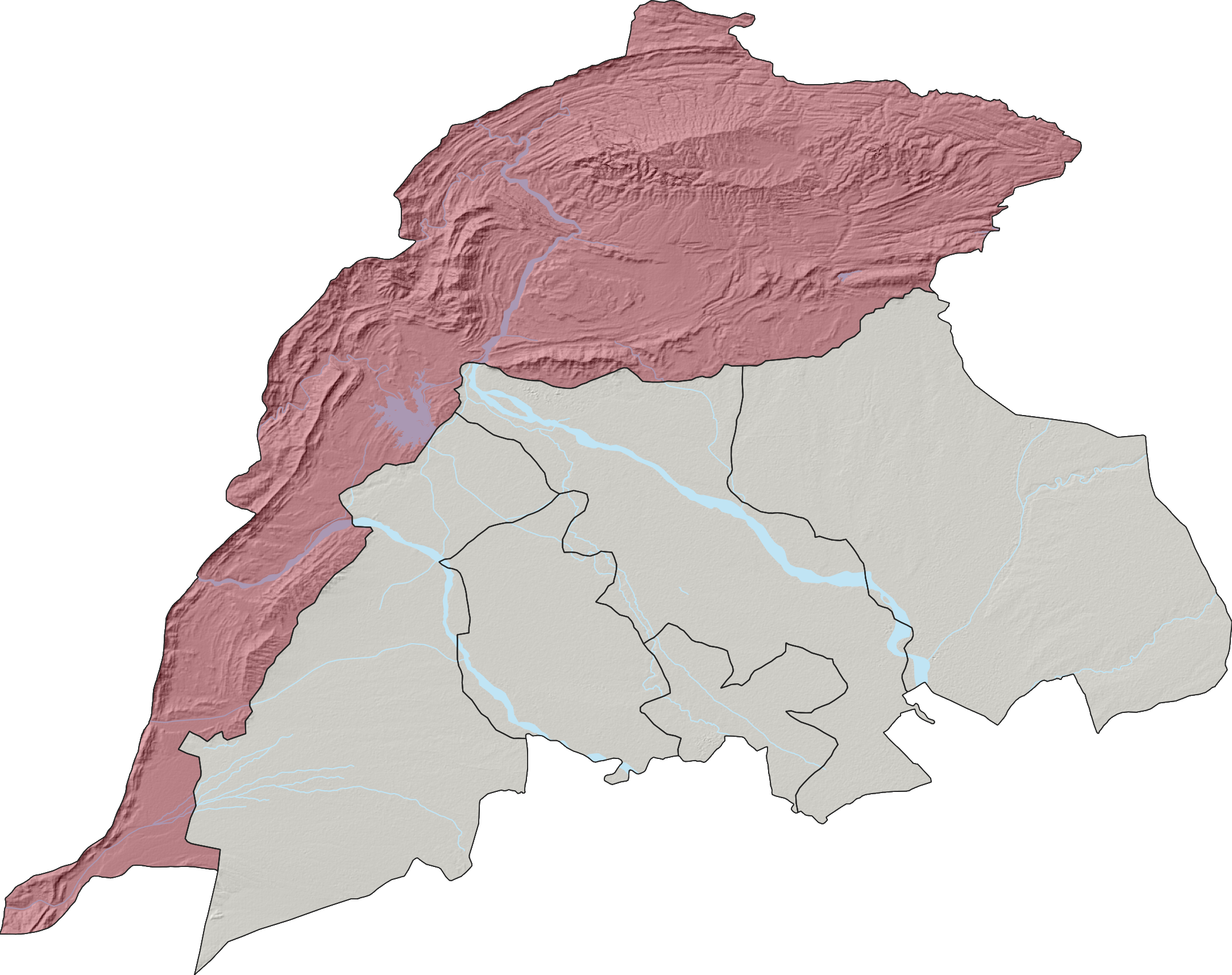
- Wazir Tehsil (red) in Bannu District
- Country: Pakistan
- Region: Khyber Pakhtunkhwa

Population (2017)
  - Total: 43,114

Wazir Tehsil is an administrative subdivision (tehsil) of Bannu District, Bannu Division, Khyber Pakhtunkhwa Province, Pakistan. The total population, according to the 1998 census, was 19,600, 98.1% of which have Pashto as a first language, and the remaining 1.9% speak Punjabi.

== Geography ==
This subdivision borders Karak District and Hangu District to the north, North Waziristan to the west, and Bettani Tehsil (formerly Lakki Marwat Subdivision) to the south.

== History ==
Prior to 2018, this administrative subdivision was known as Bannu Subdivision, and formerly also known as Frontier Region Bannu (FR Bannu), as a subdivision in Federally Administered Tribal Areas of Pakistan. The region was named after Bannu District, which lied to the east. With the dissolution of the Federally Administered Tribal Areas and its incorporation into Khyber Pakhtunkhwa, Frontier Region Bannu was reorganizd as Gumatti Tehsil within Bannu District.

== Education ==
According to the Alif Ailaan Pakistan District Education Rankings 2015, FR Bannu is ranked 67 out of 148 districts in terms of education. For facilities and infrastructure, the district is ranked 75 out of 148.

== See also ==
- Federally Administered Tribal Areas
- Bannu District
