= Paharpur, Khyber Pakhtunkhwa =

Paharpur پہاڑ پور پهاړ پور
- Town and union council
- Location within Khyber Pakhtunkhwa Location within Pakistan
- Coordinates: 32°06′14″N 70°58′14″E
- Country: Pakistan
- Province: Khyber Pakhtunkhwa
- District: Paharpur District

Population (2023)
  - Total: 76,027
- Time zone: UTC+5 (PST)

Paharpur is a city of Paharpur District in Khyber Pakhtunkhwa, Pakistan. The city is the headquarters of Paharpur Tehsil, an administrative subdivision of the district, and is a Union Council. It is located at 32°6'8N 70°58'12E and has an altitude of 173 metres (570 feet).

== Demographics ==
=== Population ===
Historical population
Year	Pop.	±% p.a.
1951	...	—
1961	4,532	—
1972	6,841	+3.81%
1981	8,665	+2.66%
1998	14,580	+3.11%
2017	69,289	+8.55%
2023	76,027	+1.56%

The population of city in 1972 was 6,841. Some five decades later, the population has risen to 76,027, according to the 2023 Census of Pakistan.

== Notable people ==
- Lt. Col Aurangzeb Khan Marwat
- Engr. Ahmad Ali Khan Marwat, Italy
