= Dara Adam Khel Tehsil =

Subdivision in Khyber Pakhtunkhwa province of Pakistan

Coordinates: 33.33°N 71.21°E

Dara Adam Khel Tehsil تحصیل درہ آدم خیل دره ادم خېل تحصیل
- Tehsil
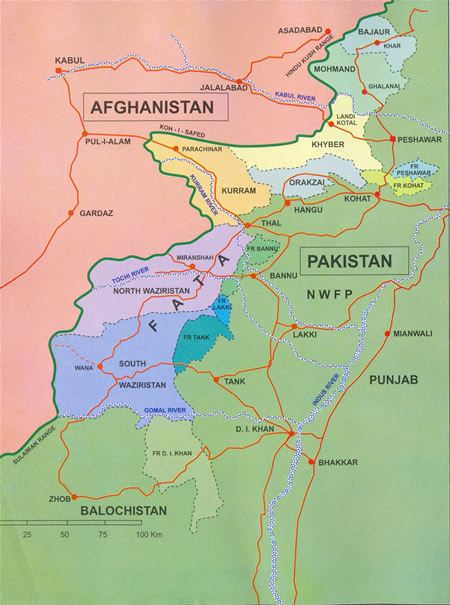
- Location of the former Frontier Regions in the former Federally Administered Tribal Areas
- Country: Pakistan
- Region: Khyber Pakhtunkhwa
- Seat: Darra Adam Khel

Population (2017)
  - Total: 118,578

Dara Adam Khel Tehsil is an administrative subdivision (tehsil) of Kohat District in Khyber Pakhtunkhwa province of Pakistan. This subdivision shares its boundary with Peshawar District to the north, Nowshera District to the east and Orakzai District to the west.

The population in 1998 was 88,500 persons, 98.6% of whom had Pashto as their first language.

The main town in this Kohat tehsil is Darra Adam Khel.

Prior to 2018, this administrative subdivision was known as Kohat Subdivision, and formerly also known as Frontier Region Kohat. The region was located adjacent to the Kohat District, and therefore derives its name from Kohat.

== Geography and climate ==
The tehsil is very hilly, with average heights of 1,500 m (4,900 ft) above sea level.

The climate of Kohat and its surroundings is hot from May to September. June is the hottest month. The mean, maximum, and minimum temperature recorded during June is about 40 °C and 27 °C respectively. A pleasant change in the weather is noted from October onwards, up till February. The winter is cold and severe. In winter a wrong west wind known as “Hangu Breeze” often blows down the Miranzai valley towards Kohat for weeks. The mean maximum and minimum temperature, recorded during the month of January, is about 18 °C and 6 °C respectively.

The rainfall is received throughout the year. The monsoon rain is received from May to October. August is the rainiest month, with an average of about 114 mm. The winter rain occurs from November to April. The highest winter rainfall is received in the month of March. The average annual rainfall is about 638 mm. The maximum humidity has been recorded in the month of August during the summer season and in December during the winter season.

== Education ==
According to the Alif Ailaan Pakistan District Education Rankings 2015, FR Kohat in terms of facilities and infrastructure, the district is ranked 74 out of 148.

== See also ==
- Federally Administered Tribal Areas
- Kohat District
