= Halim Zai Shani Khel =

- Country: Pakistan
- Region: Federally Administered Tribal Areas
- District: Mohmand Agency
- Tehsil: Halim Zai

Population (2017)
  - Total: 3,643
- Time zone: UTC+5 (PST)
  - Summer (DST): UTC+6 (PDT)

Halim Zai Shani Khel, or Shanikhel is an area of Halim Zai Tehsil, Mohmand Agency, Federally Administered Tribal Areas, Pakistan. The population is 3,643 according to the 2017 census.
