= Gandao Dam =

Dam in Pakistan

- Location within Pakistan
- Official name: Abdul Shakoor dam
- Country: Pakistan
- Location: Mohmand Agency, FATA
- Coordinates: 34°18′18″N 71°24′04″E
- Purpose: Drinking water storage
- Status: Operational
- Construction began: January 2013
- Opening date: June 2019
- Construction cost: PKR 449 million
- Owner: Government of Pakistan

Dam and spillways
- Type of dam: Gravity
- Height: 105 ft (32 m)
- Length: 250 ft (76 m)

Reservoir
- Total capacity: 810 acre feet

Gandao Dam, officially Abdul Shakoor Dam since December 2019, is a gravity dam built near town of Ghalanai in Mohmand Agency of FATA, Pakistan. It was initially is expected to complete in 2015, with projected cost of PKR 449 Millions.

The dam has a height of 32 m (105 ft) and lengths 76.2 m (250 ft). It will have total water storage capacity of around 900,000 m^{3} (730 acre⋅ft).

== Timeline ==
Construction of dam started in January 2013. The site was attacked by militants on February 17, 2013, with three of its workers being killed. Progress on the dam was stopped and did not resume until 2018. Gandao dam was "almost ready" as of March 2019, with its completion expected by June 2019.

In December 2019, Khyber Pakhtunkhwa cabinet decided to rename the dam after Abdul Shakoor, contractor of the dam killed by terrorists in 2018.

== See also ==
- List of dams and reservoirs in Pakistan
