= NA-43 (Khyber-I) =

Constituency of the National Assembly of Pakistan

NA-43 (Tribal Area-IV)
- Constituency for the National Assembly of Pakistan
- Region: Khyber District
- Electorate: 226,627

Current constituency
- Member: Vacant
- Created from: NA-45 (Tribal Area-X)

NA-43 (Tribal Area-IV) (Urdu: این اے-۴۵، قباَئلی علاقہ-۱۰) is a constituency for the National Assembly of Pakistan comprising Jamrud Subdivision, Landi Kotal Subdivision, and Mula Gori Subdivision of Khyber District.

== Members of Parliament ==
=== 2002–2018: NA-45 (Tribal Area-X) ===
Election	Member	Party
2002	Noor Ul Haq Qadri	Independent
2008	Noor Ul Haq Qadri	Independent
2013	Alhaj Shah Jee Gul Afridi	Independent

=== Since 2018: NA-43 (Tribal Area-IV) ===
Election	Member	Party
2018	Noor-ul-Haq Qadri	PTI

== Election 2002 ==
General elections were held on 10 Oct 2002. Noor-ul-Haq Qadri an independent candidate won by 9,121 votes.

== Election 2008 ==
The result of general election 2008 in this constituency is given below.

=== Result ===
Noor Ul Haq Qadri succeeded in the election 2008 and became the member of National Assembly.

General Election 2008: Tribal Area-X
Party	Candidate	Votes	%
Independent	Noor Ul Haq Qadri	13,876	40
Independent	Mohammad Ibrahim Koki Khel	12,548	36
Independent	Zahid Khan	5,351	16
Others	Others	3,191	8

== Election 2013 ==
General elections were held on 11 May 2013. Shah Ji Gul Afridi an independent candidate won by 29,697 votes and became the member of National Assembly.

== Election 2018 ==
General elections were held on 25 July 2018.

General election 2018: NA-43 (Tribal Area-IV)
Party	Candidate	Votes	%	±%
PTI	Noor-ul-Haq Qadri	33,243	39.42	
Independent	Alhaj Shah Jee Gul Afridi	30,151	35.75	
Others	Others (sixteen candidates)	20,941	24.83	
Turnout		85,892	37.90	
Total valid votes		84,335	98.19	
Rejected ballots		1,557	1.81	
Majority		3,092	3.67	
Registered electors		226,627		
PTI gain from Independent				

== See also ==
- NA-42 (Tribal Area-III)
- NA-44 (Tribal Area-V)
