= PK-68 Mohmand-II =

Pakistani political constituency

- Constituency for the Khyber Pakhtunkhwa Assembly
- Region: Halim Zai, Safi and Upper Mohmand Tehsils of Mohmand District

Current constituency
- Created: 2018
- Party: Pakistan Tehreek-e-Insaf
- Member: Muhammad Israr
- Created from: PK-104 Mohmand-II (2018-2023)

PK-68 Mohmand-II (پی کے-68 مہمند-2) is a constituency for the Khyber Pakhtunkhwa Assembly of the Khyber Pakhtunkhwa province of Pakistan. It was created in 2018 after merger of FATA with Khyber Pakhtunkhwa before 2019 elections.

== Members of Assembly ==
=== 2019-2023: PK-104 Mohmand-II ===
Election	Member	Party
2019	Malik Abbas Rehman	BAP

== Election 2019 ==
After merger of FATA with Khyber Pakhtunkhwa provincial elections were held for the very first time. Independent candidate Malik Abbas Rehman won the seat by getting 11,763 votes. He later joined Balochistan Awami Party.

Provincial election 2019: PK-104 Mohmand-II
Party	Candidate	Votes	%
Independent	Malik Abbas Rehman	11,763	24.72
JUI (F)	Muhammad Arif	9,808	20.61
PTI	Sajjad Khan	7,766	16.32
Independent	Muhammad Israr	6,858	14.41
PPP	Israel	2,071	4.35
JI	Muhammad Saeed	2,028	4.26
Independent	Hayat Muhammad	1,909	4.01
ANP	Hazrat Khan	1,512	3.18
Independent	Zahid ullah Khan	1,197	2.52
PML(N)	Tahir Akbar	1,015	2.13
Independent	Others (8 Independents)	1,667	3.50
Turnout		48,086	28.29
Valid ballots		47,594	98.98
Rejected ballots		492	1.02
Majority		1,955	4.11
Registered electors		1,70,002	
Independent win (new seat)			

== See also ==
- PK-67 Mohmand-I
- PK-69 Khyber-I
