= 2019 Khyber Pakhtunkhwa provincial election =

2019 Khyber Pakhtunkhwa provincial election (Tribal Districts)
- 20 July 2019

21 of 145 seats in the Provincial Assembly 73 seats needed for a majority
- Turnout: 26.26%

	First party	Second party	Third party
Leader	Mahmood Khan	Akram Khan Durrani	Asfandyar Wali Khan
Party	PTI	MMA	ANP
Leader's seat	Swat-VIII	Bannu-IV	Not Contested
Seats before	84	18	12
Seats won	10	5	1
Seats after	95	18	12
Seat change	▲10	▲5	▲1
Popular vote	182,023	169,203	48,325
Percentage	24.75%	23%	6.57%
Chief Minister before election
Mahmood Khan
PTI
Elected Chief Minister
Mahmood Khan
PTI

Provincial elections were held in the Pakistani province of Khyber Pakhtunkhwa's constituencies belonging to areas previously known as the Federally Administered Tribal Areas (FATA) on 20 July 2019. After the election, the new members joined the already elected members from the rest of the province to complete the formation of 11th Provincial Assembly of Khyber Pakhtunkhwa.

== Background ==
On 31 May 2018, the former president of Pakistan Mamnoon Hussain signed the landmark Twenty-fifth Amendment to the Constitution of Pakistan which was already passed by the National Assembly of Pakistan and Senate of Pakistan earlier that year. The amendment called for the integration of FATA into Khyber Pakhtunkhwa. It also outlined that provincial elections will be held in areas of former FATA within one year of 2018 Pakistani general election. To fulfill that requirement, the new president of Pakistan Arif Alvi directed the Election Commission of Pakistan (ECP) in late 2018 to conduct the elections in May 2019. ECP started the work to delimit the constituencies. During the delimitation exercise, sixteen new constituencies were created to elect the members on general seats and four reserved seats for women and one for Non-Muslims.

On 6 May 2019, it was announced that the election will be held on 20 July 2019.

285 candidates of different parties including two women candidates ran for elections out of which 202 were Independent candidates. Over 2.1 million voters used their right to vote for the first ever provincial elections.

A total 1896 polling stations were created across the tribal districts out of which 450 polling stations have been declared sensitive.

Polling started in morning 8 till evening 5 without any break.

== Results ==
According to official Results Independents won 6 seats, Pakistan Tehreek-e-Insaf won 5 seats, Jamiat Ulema-e-Islam F won 3 seats, Jamat-e-Islami and Awami National Party won 1 seats each.

Party	Votes	%	Seats			
Party	Votes	%	General	Women	Non-Muslims	Total
Pakistan Tehreek-e-Insaf	182,023	25.13	5	2	1	8
Jamiat Ulema-e-Islam (F)	112,999	15.60	3	1	0	4
Jamaat-e-Islami Pakistan	56,204	7.76	1	0	0	1
Awami National Party	48,325	6.67	1	0	0	1
Pakistan Peoples Party	28,049	3.87	0	0	0	0
Pakistan Muslim League (N)	8,257	1.14	0	0	0	0
Qaumi Watan Party	2,650	0.37	0	0	0	0
Jamiat Ulema-e-Islam (S)	364	0.05	0	0	0	0
Pak Sarzameen Party	317	0.04	0	0	0	0
Pakistan Awami Inqlab League	238	0.03	0	0	0	0
Independents	284,788	39.32	6	1	0	7
Total	724,214	100.00	16	4	1	21
Valid votes	724,214	98.47				
Invalid/blank votes	11,262	1.53				
Total votes	735,476	100.00				
Registered voters/turnout	2,800,831	26.26				

=== Results by district ===
Division	District	Seats	PTI	JUI(F)	JI	ANP	BAP	IND
Ex-FATA	Bajaur	3	2	0	1	0	0	0
Ex-FATA	Mohmand	2	0	0	0	1	1	0
Ex-FATA	Khyber	3	1	0	0	0	2	0
Ex-FATA	Kurram	2	1	1	0	0	0	0
Ex-FATA	Orakzai	1	1	0	0	0	0	0
Ex-FATA	North Waziristan	2	1	0	0	0	0	1
Ex-FATA	South Waziristan	2	1	1	0	0	0	0
Ex-FATA	Ex-Frontier Regions	1	0	1	0	0	0	0
Total		16	7	3	1	1	3	1

=== Result by constituency ===
District	Constituency		Winner				Runner Up				Margin	Turnout %
District	No.	Name	Candidate	Party	Votes	%	Candidate	Party	Votes	%	Margin	Turnout %
Bajaur	PK-100	Bajaur-I	Anwar Zeb Khan	PTI	12,995	25.35	Wahid Gul	JI	11,836	23.09	1,159	33.47
Bajaur	PK-101	Bajaur-II	Ajmal Khan	PTI	12,204	26.18	Sahibzada Haroon ur Rasheed	JI	10,514	22.55	1,690	29.46
Bajaur	PK-102	Bajaur-III	Sirajuddin Khan	JI	19,144	28.75	Hamid ur Rehman	PTI	13,517	20.92	5,627	31.30
Mohmand	PK-103	Mohmand-I	Nisar Mohmand	ANP	11,258	28.61	Rahim Shah	PTI	9,687	24.62	1,571	36.28
Mohmand	PK-104	Mohmand-II	Malik Abbas Rehman	IND	11,763	24.72	Muhammad Arif	JUI(F)	9,808	20.61	1,955	28.29
Khyber	PK-105	Khyber-I	Shafiq Sher Afridi	IND	19,747	43.88	Shermat Khan	IND	10,748	23.88	8,999	27.42
Khyber	PK-106	Khyber-II	Bilawal Afridi	IND	12,855	37.35	Khan Shahid Afridi	IND	6,304	18.32	6,551	23.51
Khyber	PK-107	Khyber-III	Muhammad Shafiq Afridi	IND	9,796	26.15	Hameed Ullah Jan Afridi	IND	8,473	22.62	1,323	17.53
Kurram	PK-108	Kurram-I	Muhammad Riaz Shaheen	JUI(F)	11,840	26.88	Jamil Khan	IND	11,342	25.75	498	26.60
Kurram	PK-109	Kurram-II	Iqbal Mian	PTI	39,716	53.32	Inayat Ali	IND	23,030	30.92	16,686	40.28
Orakzai	PK-110	Orakzai	Syed Ghazi Ghazan Jamal	IND	18,461	39.17	Muhammad Arif	PTI	15,057	31.94	3,404	24.24
North Waziristan	PK-111	North Waziristan-I	Muhammad Iqbal Wazir	PTI	10,200	27.71	Sami Uddin	JUI(F)	9,288	25.23	912	26.26
North Waziristan	PK-112	North Waziristan-II	Mir Kalam Wazir	IND	12,061	33.41	Sadiq Ullah	JUI(F)	7,982	22.11	4,079	20.31
South Waziristan	PK-113	South Waziristan-I	Isam-ud-Din	JUI(F)	9,712	28.39	Waheed Khan	IND	9,688	28.32	24	16.15
South Waziristan	PK-114	South Waziristan-II	Naseerullah Wazir	PTI	11,114	29.81	Muhammad Arif	IND	10,272	27.55	842	22.65
Ex-Frontier Regions	PK-115	Frontier Regions	Muhammad Shoaib	JUI(F)	18,102	39.11	Abid Ur Rehman	PTI	18,028	38.95	74	24.69

=== Members elected on reserved seats ===
Reserved Seats	Party	Member
For Women	Pakistan Tehreek-e-Insaf	Anita Mehsud
For Women	Pakistan Tehreek-e-Insaf	Aysha Bibi
For Women	Muttahida Majlis-e-Amal	Naeema Kishwar
For Women	Balochistan Awami Party	Baserat Khan
For Non-Muslims	Pakistan Tehreek-e-Insaf	Wilson Wazir

== Aftermath ==
After the elections, five out of the six independents joined political parties. Three joined the Balochistan Awami Party (BAP) and two joined the Pakistan Tehreek-e-Insaf (PTI).

Following this, PTI was declared to have secured two of the four reserved seats for women and the one reserved for minorities. Jamiat Ulema-e-Islam (F) (JUI-F) and BAP each secured one reserved seat for women.

Newly elected members took oath on 27 August 2019.
