= Mohmand marble mine landslide =

2020 mine disaster in Pakistan

- Date: 7 September 2020
- Location: Safi Tehsel, Mohmand District, Khyber Pakhtunkhwa, Pakistan
- Deaths: 18+
- Injuries: 20+ injured

The Mohmand marble mine landslide happened on 7 September 2020 in Mohmand District, Khyber Pakhtunkhwa, Pakistan. The landslide at a marble mine killed at least 18 people and injured more than 20.
