= Moto Shah Dam =

Dam in Pakistan

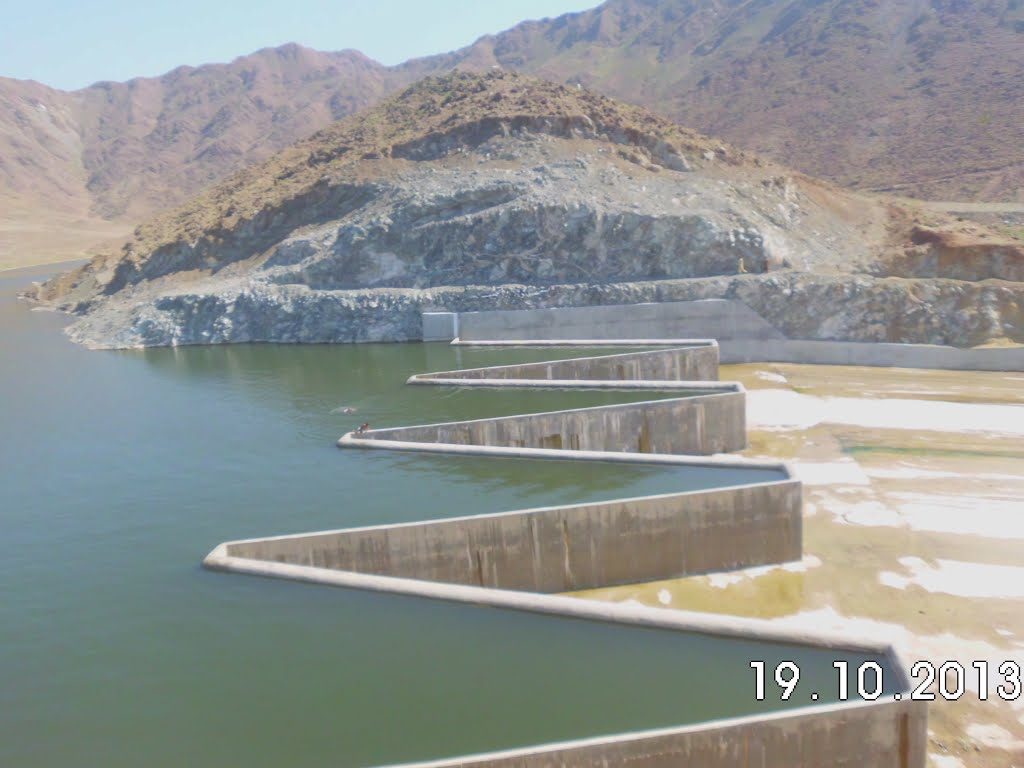

- Location within Pakistan
- Country: Pakistan
- Location: Mohmand Agency, FATA
- Coordinates: 34°23′50.14″N 71°35′31.68″E
- Status: Under construction
- Construction began: November 2012
- Opening date: August 2014
- Construction cost: PKR 191.60 million
- Owner: Government of Pakistan

Dam and spillways
- Type of dam: Embankment, rock-filled
- Height: 101 ft (31 m)
- Length: 377 ft (115 m)

Reservoir
- Total capacity: 1140 acre feet
- Catchment area: 10.042 square miles

Moto Shah Dam is small earth core rock-fill dam operational in Mohmand Agency of FATA, Pakistan.

Construction of project started in 2012, and was completed on 30 August 2014 at a cost of PKR 191.60 Million. The dam has a height 31 m (101 ft) and length of 115 m (377 ft).

The dam will irrigate area of 254 ha (627 acres)cultivable lands, with total water storage capacity of around 461 ha (1,140 acres).

== See also ==
- List of dams and reservoirs in Pakistan
