= Muhammad Israr =

Pakistani politician

Member of the Provincial Assembly of Khyber Pakhtunkhwa
- Incumbent
- Assumed office 29 February 2024
- Constituency: PK-68 Mohmand-II

Personal details
- Born: Mohmand District, Khyber Pakhtunkhwa, Pakistan
- Political party: PTI (2024-present)

Muhammad Israr is a Pakistani politician from Mohmand District. He is currently serving as member of the Provincial Assembly of Khyber Pakhtunkhwa since February 2024.

== Career ==
He contested the 2024 general elections as a Pakistan Tehreek-e-Insaf/Independent candidate from PK-68 Mohmand-II. He secured 20,690 votes while the runner-up was Haneef Ul Zaman of JUI-F who secured 12,156 votes.
