= Muhammad Adnan Qadri =

Pakistani politician

Provincial Minister of Auqaf, Hajj & Religious Affairs for Khyber Pakhtunkhwa
- In office 7 March 2024 – 13 October 2025

Member of the Provincial Assembly of Khyber Pakhtunkhwa
- Incumbent
- Assumed office 29 February 2024
- Preceded by: Shafiq Sher Afridi
- Constituency: PK-69 Khyber-I

Personal details
- Born: Khyber District, Khyber Pakhtunkhwa, Pakistan
- Party: PTI (2024-present)
- Relations: Noor-ul-Haq Qadri (uncle)

Muhammad Adnan Qadri is a Pakistani politician from Khyber District. He served as Provincial Minister of Auqaf, Hajj and Religious Affairs in the Gandapur ministry. He is also a member of a Sufi family and is currently a member of the Provincial Assembly of Khyber Pakhtunkhwa since 28 February 2024.

== Political career ==
=== Electoral history ===
He contested the 2024 general elections as a Pakistan Tehreek-e-Insaf/Independent candidate from PK-69 Khyber-I. He secured 25,596 votes while the runner-up was Shafiq Sher Afridi of Pakistan Muslim League (N) who secured 10,095 votes. Following this, he became Provincial Minister of Auquf, Hajj and Religious Affairs in the Gandapur ministry.

=== Minister of Auqaf, Hajj & Religious Affairs ===
In a meeting with the KP Auqaf Department, Chief Minister Ali Amin Gandapur directed Adnan Qadri’s department for the initiation of GIS mapping and the creation of an Assets Management Unit for Auqaf properties, together with a Quran Mahal in Peshawar to preserve old Qu'ran copies. Along with these auqaf properties developments, Adnan Qadri launched an anti-polio drive on 9 September 2024, aiming to vaccinate 6.425 million children to protect from the polio virus. The first step of the plan was announced to cover 27 districts and deploy 50,000 security officers for safety.

== Personal life ==
He belongs to the prominent Sufi religious family of Landi Kotal, Khyber District. He is the son of Ex-Senator Abdul Malik Qadri and nephew of Ex Federal Minister Noor ul Haq Qadri.
