= Mohammed Iqbal Khan Afridi =

Pakistani politician

Mohammed Iqbal Khan

Parliamentary Secretary for States and Frontier Region
- In office 19 June 2019 – 9 April 2022
- President: Arif Alvi
- Prime Minister: Imran Khan
- Minister: Sahabzada Mehboob Sultan

Member of the National Assembly of Pakistan
- Incumbent
- Assumed office 29 February 2024
- Constituency: NA-27 Khyber
- In office 13 August 2018 – 20 January 2023
- Constituency: NA-44 (Tribal Area-V)

Personal details
- Party: PTI (2018-present)

Mohammed Iqbal Khan (Urdu: محمد اقبال خان آفریدی) is a Pakistani politician who has been a member of the National Assembly of Pakistan since February 2024. He previously served as a member from August 2013 to till 20 January 2023. On June 12, 2026, he was suspended from the House due to misbehavior with the National Assembly staff during the budget session.

== Political career ==
He was elected to the National Assembly of Pakistan as a candidate of Pakistan Tehreek-e-Insaf (PTI) from Constituency NA-44 (Tribal Area-V) in the 2018 Pakistani general election. He received 12,537 votes and defeated Hameed Ullah Jan Afridi.

== More Reading ==
- List of members of the 15th National Assembly of Pakistan
