= Abdul Ghani (Khyber Pakhtunkhwa politician) =

Pakistani politician

Member of the Provincial Assembly of Khyber Pakhtunkhwa
- Incumbent
- Assumed office 29 February 2024
- Constituency: PK-71 Khyber-III

Personal details
- Born: Khyber District, Khyber Pakhtunkhwa, Pakistan
- Political party: PTI (2024-present)

Abdul Ghani is a Pakistani politician from Khyber District. He is currently serving as member of the Provincial Assembly of Khyber Pakhtunkhwa since February 2024.

He contested the 2024 general elections as a Pakistan Tehreek-e-Insaf/Independent candidate from PK-71 Khyber-III. He secured 15,061 votes while the runner-up was Khan Wali of Jamaat-e-Islami who secured 7,903 votes.
