= PK-67 Mohmand-I =

Pakistani political constituency

- Constituency for the Khyber Pakhtunkhwa Assembly
- Region: Ambar Utman Khel, Pindiali, Pran Ghar and Eka Ghund Tehsils of Mohmand District

Current constituency
- Created: 2018
- Party: Pakistan Tehreek-e-Insaf
- Member: Mehboob Sher
- Created from: PK-103 Mohmand-I (2018–2023)

PK-67 Mohmand-I (پی کے-67 مہمند-1) is a constituency for the Khyber Pakhtunkhwa Assembly of the Khyber Pakhtunkhwa province of Pakistan. It was created in 2018 after merger of FATA with Khyber Pakhtunkhwa before 2019 elections.

== Members of Assembly ==
=== 2019–2023: PK-103 Mohmand-I ===
Election	Member	Party
2019	Nisar Mohmand	ANP

== Election 2019 ==
After merger of FATA with Khyber Pakhtunkhwa provincial elections were held for the first time. Awami National Party candidate Nisar Mohmand won the seat by getting 11,258 votes.

Provincial election 2019: PK-103 Mohmand-I
Party	Candidate	Votes	%
ANP	Nisar Mohmand	11,258	28.61
PTI	Rahim Shah	9,687	24.62
JUI (F)	Gulab Noor	8,310	21.12
PPP	Arshad Khan	6,304	16.02
JI	Fazl e Raziq	1,830	4.65
QWP	Mustafa Khan	1,068	2.71
Independent	Others (8 Independents)	890	2.26
Turnout		40,085	36.28
Valid ballots		39,347	98.16
Rejected ballots		738	1.84
Majority		3,404	7.23
Registered electors		1,10,480	
ANP win (new seat)			

== See also ==
- PK-66 Charsadda-V
- PK-68 Mohmand-II
