= Shahid Banda =

- Country: Pakistan
- Region: Federally Administered Tribal Areas
- District: Mohmand Agency
- Tehsil: Pindiali

Population (2017)
  - Total: 1,837
- Time zone: UTC+5 (PST)
  - Summer (DST): UTC+6 (PDT)

Shahid Banda is an area of Pindiali Tehsil, Mohmand Agency, Federally Administered Tribal Areas, Pakistan. The population is 1,837 according to the 2017 census.

== Education ==
A primary school for boys was founded in 1980. A primary school for girls was founded in 2007.
