= Taj Muhammad Afridi =

Pakistani politician (1970–2026)

- تاج محمد آفریدی

Minister for Relief, Rehabilitation, and Resettlement KPK
- Caretaker
- In office 26 January 2023 – 10 August 2023

Member of the Senate of Pakistan
- In office 11 March 2015 – 11 March 2021

Personal details
- Born: 1 February 1970 Khyber District, North West Frontier Province, Pakistan
- Died: 12 June 2026 (aged 56) Swabi District, Khyber Pakhtunkhwa, Pakistan
- Party: Pakistan Muslim League (N) (2023–2026); Tehreeke Islahate Pakistan (2022–2023); Balochistan Awami Party (2021–2022); Independent (2015–2021)
- Relatives: Shahjee Gul Afridi (brother); Bilawal Afridi (nephew); Shafiq Sher Afridi (nephew)

Taj Muhammad Afridi (Urdu: تاج محمد آفریدی; 1 February 1970 – 12 June 2026) was a Pakistani politician who was a member of Senate of Pakistan from March 2015 to March 2021. He was also the provincial caretaker Minister for Relief and Rehabilitation from January to August 2023.

== Background ==
Taj was a member of the Afridi tribe. Afridi was the brother of Alhaj Shah Jee Gul Afridi.

He owned an oil refinery and was an owner of Al-Haj Enterprises and Al Haj FAW Motors. He had once been a contractor for NATO in Afghanistan.

Afridi died in a traffic collision on 12 June 2026, at the age of 56.

== Political career ==
Afridi was elected to the Senate of Pakistan on a general seat from the Federally Administered Tribal Areas (FATA) as an independent candidate in the 2015 Pakistani Senate election. His term ended on 11 March 2021.

He contested the 2021 Pakistani Senate election on a general seat from Khyber Pakhtunkhwa as a candidate of Balochistan Awami Party (BAP), but was unsuccessful.

Afridi joined the Tehreeke Islahate Pakistan on 14 August 2021.

He was appointed the provincial Caretaker Cabinet of Khyber Pakhtunkhwa on 26 January 2023, and was given the portfolio of Relief, Rehabilitation, and Resettlement. He resigned along with the entire cabinet on 10 August 2023.

On 16 June 2023, he joined the Pakistan Muslim League (N) (PML(N)) together with his brother, Shahjee Gul Afridi.

On 30 October 2025, he contested a Senate by-election to a general seat from Khyber Pakhtunkhwa as an independent candidate, but was unsuccessful. He received 45 votes, and was defeated by Khurram Zeeshan, an independent candidate supported by Pakistan Tehreek-e-Insaf (PTI), who received 91 votes.
