= PK-70 Khyber-II =

Pakistani constituency

- Constituency for the Khyber Pakhtunkhwa Assembly
- Region: Bara and Fort Salop Tehsils (partly) and Jamrud Tehsil of Khyber District

Current constituency
- Created: 2018
- Party: Sunni Ittehad Council
- Member: Muhammad Sohail Afridi
- Created from: PK-106 Khyber-II (2018-2023)

PK-70 Khyber-II (پی کے-70 خیبر-2) is a constituency for the Khyber Pakhtunkhwa Assembly of the Khyber Pakhtunkhwa province of Pakistan.It was created in 2018 after merger of FATA with Khyber Pakhtunkhwa before 2019 elections.

== Members of Assembly ==
=== 2019-2023: PK-106 Khyber-II ===
Election	Member	Party
2019	Bilawal Afridi	BAP

=== 2024-present: PK-70 Khyber-II ===
Election	Member	Party
2024	Muhammad Sohail Afridi	SIC

== Election 2019 ==
After merger of FATA with Khyber Pakhtunkhwa provincial elections were held for the very first time. Independent candidate Bilawal Afridi won the seat by getting 12,855 votes. He later joined Balochistan Awami Party.

Provincial election 2019: PK-106 Khyber-II
Party	Candidate	Votes	%
Independent	Bilawal Afridi	12,855	37.35
Independent	Khan Shahid Afridi	6,304	18.32
PTI	Amir Muhammad Khan Afridi	5,951	17.29
JI	Shah Jehan	4,267	12.40
JUI (F)	Ghufranullah	2,430	7.06
Independent	Suhbat Khan	960	2.79
PPP	Shah Khalid	689	2.00
Independent	Muhammad Humayun	239	0.69
ANP	Naheed	196	0.57
PML(N)	Said Gah Jan	121	0.35
Independent	Others (9 Independents)	405	1.18
Turnout		34,903	23.51
Valid ballots		34,417	98.61
Rejected ballots		486	1.39
Majority		6,551	19.03
Registered electors		1,48,478	
Independent win (new seat)			

== See also ==
- PK-69 Khyber-I
- PK-71 Khyber-III
