= PK-20 Bajaur-II =

Pakistani political constituency

- Constituency for the Khyber Pakhtunkhwa Assembly
- Region: Salarzai Tehsil of Bajaur District

Current constituency
- Created: 2018
- Party: Pakistan Tehreek-e-Insaf
- Created from: PK-101 Bajaur-II (2018-2023); PK-19 Bajaur-II (2023-)

PK-20 Bajaur-II (پی کے-20 باجوڑ-2) is a constituency for the Khyber Pakhtunkhwa Assembly of the Khyber Pakhtunkhwa province of Pakistan.It was created in 2018 after merger of FATA with Khyber Pakhtunkhwa before 2019 elections.

== Members of Assembly ==
=== 2019-2023: PK-101 Bajaur-II ===
Election	Member	Party
2019	Ajmal Khan	Pakistan Tehreek-e-Insaf

== Election 2019 ==
After merger of FATA with Khyber Pakhtunkhwa provincial elections were held for the very first time. Pakistan Tehreek-e-Insaf candidate Ajmal Khan won the seat by getting 12,204 votes.

Provincial election 2019: PK-101 Bajaur-II
Party	Candidate	Votes	%
PTI	Ajmal Khan	12,204	26.18
JI	Sahibzada Haroon ur Rasheed	10,514	22.55
ANP	Lali Shah	6,321	13.56
PPP	Muhammad Anees Khan	5,947	12.76
JUI (F)	Ahmed Zeb Khan	4,852	10.41
Independent	Said Ahmad Jan	2,539	5.45
Independent	Muhammad Zahoor Khan	1,228	2.63
Independent	Khaista Nawab	934	2.00
PML(N)	Nizam uddin Khan	932	2.00
Independent	Jamal Noor Khan	667	1.43
Independent	Amjad Khan	172	0.37
Independent	Juma Said	138	0.30
PSP	Muhammad Naeem	104	0.22
Independent	Inayat Ur Rehman	45	0.10
Independent	Nawab Zada Jalal Uddin Khan	25	0.05
Turnout		47,451	29.46
Valid ballots		46,622	98.25
Rejected ballots		829	1.75
Majority		1,690	3.63
Registered electors		1,61,047	
PTI win (new seat)			

== See also ==
- PK-19 Bajaur-I
- PK-21 Bajaur-III
