= Naseerullah Wazir =

Pakistani politician

Member of the Provincial Assembly of Khyber Pakhtunkhwa
- In office 27 August 2019 – 18 January 2023
- Constituency: PK-114 (South Waziristan-II)

Personal details
- Born: South Waziristan District, Khyber Pakhtunkhwa, Pakistan
- Party: PTI-P (2023-present)
- Other political affiliations: PTI (2019-2023)

Naseerullah Wazir is a Pakistani politician who was a member of the Provincial Assembly of Khyber Pakhtunkhwa from August 2019 to January 2023.

== Political career ==
Wazir contested the 2019 Khyber Pakhtunkhwa provincial election on 20 July 2019 from constituency PK-114 (South Waziristan-II) on the ticket of Pakistan Tehreek-e-Insaf. He won the election by the majority of 842 votes over the independent runner up Arif Wazir. He garnered 11,114 votes while Arif Wazir received 10,272 votes.
