= PK-109 Upper South Waziristan =

Pakistani political constituency

- Constituency for the Khyber Pakhtunkhwa Assembly
- Region: Upper South Waziristan District

Current constituency
- Created: 2019
- Party: Jamiat Ulema-e-Islam (F)
- Member: Hafiz Isam Uddin
- Created from: PK-113 South Waziristan-I (2019-2023)

PK-109 Upper South Waziristan (پی کے-109، بالائی جنوبی وزیرستان) is a constituency for the Khyber Pakhtunkhwa Assembly of the Khyber Pakhtunkhwa province of Pakistan.

== Members of Assembly ==
=== 2019-2023: PK-113 South Waziristan-I ===
Election	Member	Party
2019	Hafiz Isam Uddin	JUI-F

== Election 2019 ==
After merger of FATA with Khyber Pakhtunkhwa provincial elections were held for the very first time. JUI-F Candidate Isam-ud-Din won the seat by getting 9712 votes.

Provincial election 2019: PK-113 South Waziristan-I
Party	Candidate	Votes	%
JUI (F)	Isam-ud-Din	9,712	28.39
Independent	Waheed Khan	9,688	28.32
PTI	Afsar Khan	5,141	15.03
Independent	Qayyum Sher	4,042	11.82
Independent	Arif Zaman Burki	2,360	6.90
PPP	Najeeb ullah	1,776	5.19
JI	Sami Ullah Jan	484	1.41
QWP	Atta Mir Khan	262	0.77
Independent	Others (12 Independents)	745	2.17
Turnout		35,331	16.15
Valid ballots		34,210	96.83
Rejected ballots		1,121	3.17
Majority		24	0.07
Registered electors		187,539	
JUI (F) win (new seat)			

== See also ==
- PK-108 Tank
- PK-110 Lower South Waziristan
