= Shafiq Afridi =

Pakistani politician

Member of the Provincial Assembly of Khyber Pakhtunkhwa
- In office 27 August 2019 – 18 January 2023
- Constituency: PK-107 (Khyber-III)

Personal details
- Party: PTI-P (2023-present)
- Other political affiliations: PTI (2019-2023)

Muhammad Shafiq Afridi is a Pakistani politician who was a member of the Provincial Assembly of Khyber Pakhtunkhwa from August 2019 to January 2023.

== Political career ==
Afridi contested the 2019 Khyber Pakhtunkhwa provincial election on 20 July 2019 from constituency PK-107 (Khyber-III) as an independent. He won the election by the majority of 1,368 votes over the runner up Hameed Ullah Jan Afridi, also an independent. He garnered 9,796 votes while Hameedullah Afridi received 8,428 votes.
