= Shahjee Gul Afridi =

Pakistani politician

Alhaj Shah Gee Gul Afridi
- الحاج شاہ جی گل آفریدی
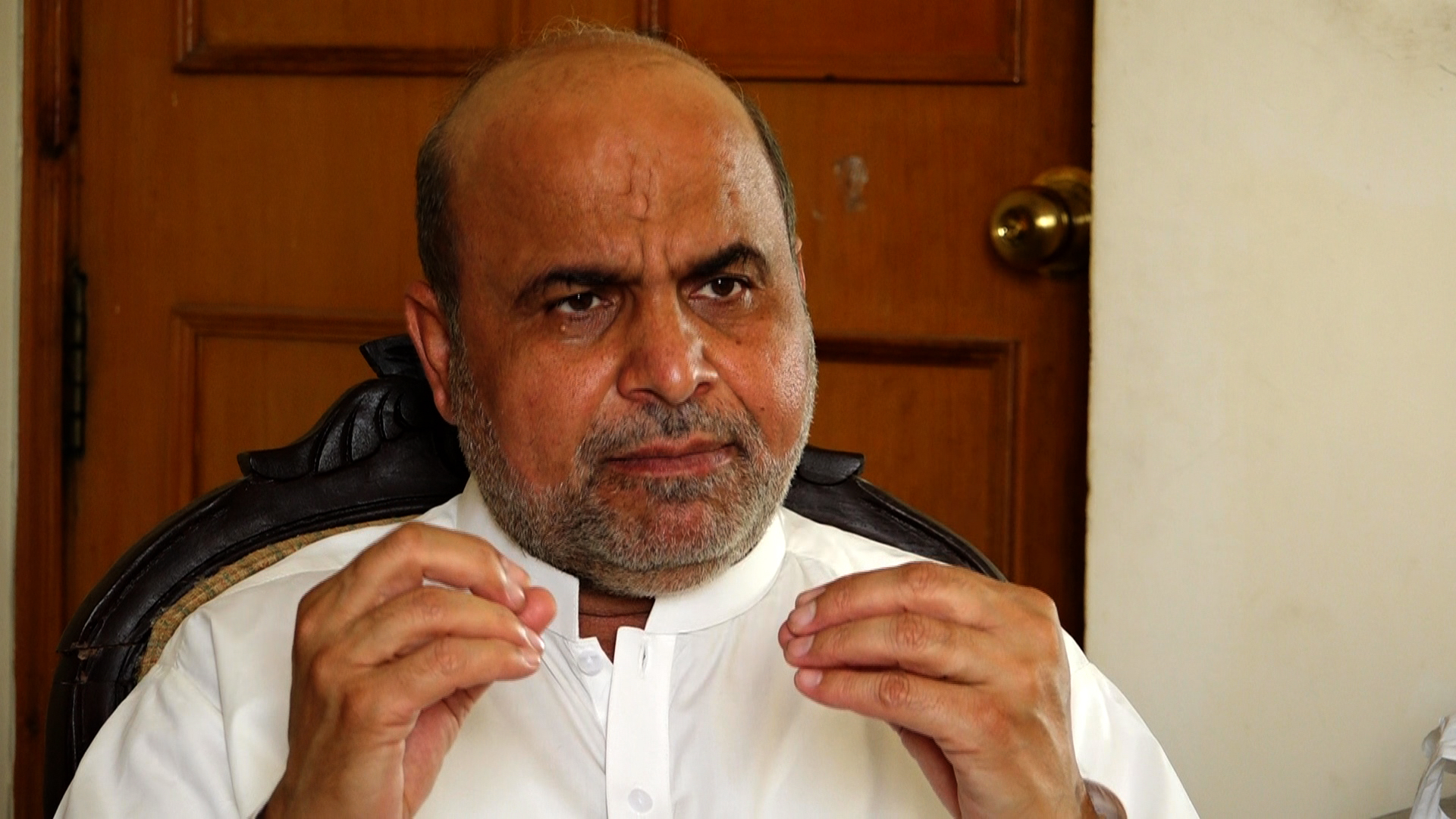

Member of the National Assembly of Pakistan
- In office 1 June 2013 – 31 May 2018
- Constituency: NA-45 (Khyber Agency)

Personal details
- Born: 1 January 1961 (age 65) Shahkas, Khyber Agency, Peshawar Pakistan
- Party: PMLN (2023-present)
- Other political affiliations: Tehreeke Islahate Pakistan (2021-2023)
- Children: Bilawal Afridi (son)
- Relatives: Taj Muhammad Afridi (brother); Shafiq Sher Afridi (nephew)

Alhaj Shahjee Gul Afridi (Urdu: الحاج شاہ جی گل آفریدی; born 1 January 1961) is a Pakistani politician who had been a member of the National Assembly of Pakistan from June 2013 to May 2018.

== Early life ==
He was born on 1 January 1961.

He is brother of Taj Muhammad Afridi.

== Political career ==
He ran for the seat of the National Assembly of Pakistan as an independent candidate from Constituency NA-46 (Tribal Area-XI) in the 2002 Pakistani general election but was unsuccessful and lost the seat to an independent candidate, Khalilur Rehman Afridi.

He was elected to the National Assembly as an independent candidate from Constituency NA-45 (Tribal Area-X) in the 2013 Pakistani general election. He received 29,697 votes and defeated an independent candidate, Noor-ul-Haq Qadri.

He ran for the National Assembly as an independent candidate from NA-43 Khyber-I in the 2018 Pakistani general election, but was unsuccessful. He received 30,151 votes and was defeated by Noor-ul-Haq Qadri, a candidate of the Pakistan Tehreek-e-Insaf (PTI).

On 14 August 2021, he founded his own political party called Tehreeke Islahate Pakistan with the objective of starting reforms across the former Federally Administered Tribal Areas. On 13 June 2023, he joined and merged his party with the Pakistan Muslim League (N) (PML(N)).
