= PK-69 Khyber-I =

Constituency in Khyber Pakhtunkhwa, Pakistan

- Constituency for the Khyber Pakhtunkhwa Assembly
- Region: Landi Kotal, Mullagori and Zakha Khel Tehsils of Khyber District

Current constituency
- Created: 2018
- Party: Pakistan Tehreek-e-Insaf
- Member(s): Muhammad Adnan Qadri
- Created from: PK-105 Khyber-I (2018-2023)

PK-69 Khyber-I (پی کے-69 خیبر-1) is a constituency for the Khyber Pakhtunkhwa Assembly of the Khyber Pakhtunkhwa province of Pakistan.It was created in 2018 after merger of FATA with Khyber Pakhtunkhwa before 2019 elections.

== Members of Assembly ==
=== 2019-2023: PK-105 Khyber-I ===
Election	Member	Party
2019	Shafiq Sher Afridi	BAP

== Election 2019 ==
After merger of FATA with Khyber Pakhtunkhwa provincial elections were held for the very first time. Independent candidate Shafiq Sher Afridi won the seat by getting 19,747 votes. He later joined Balochistan Awami Party.

Provincial election 2019: PK-105 Khyber-I
Party	Candidate	Votes	%
Independent	Shafiq Sher Afridi	19,747	43.88
Independent	Shermat Khan	10,748	23.88
PTI	Shahid Hussain	2,895	6.43
Independent	Malik Darya Khan Zakha Khel	2,546	5.66
PPP	Muhammad Nadeem	2,239	4.98
JUI (F)	Muhammad Ijaz	1,866	4.15
QWP	Ali Rehman	1,328	2.95
ANP	Shah Hussain	1,243	2.76
JI	Murad Hussain	640	1.42
Independent	Others (13 Independents)	1,749	3.89
Turnout		45,922	27.42
Valid ballots		45,001	97.99
Rejected ballots		921	2.01
Majority		8,999	20.00
Registered electors		1,67,484	
Independent win (new seat)			

== See also ==
- PK-68 Mohmand-II
- PK-70 Khyber-II
