= Sirajuddin Khan =

Pakistani politician

Member of the Provincial Assembly of Khyber Pakhtunkhwa
- In office 20 July 2019 – 18 January 2023
- Constituency: PK-102 (Bajaur-III)

Personal details
- Party: Jamaat-e-Islami Pakistan (2019-present)

Sirajuddin Khan is a Pakistani politician who was a member of the Provincial Assembly of Khyber Pakhtunkhwa from July 2019 till January 2023.

== Political career ==
Khan contested the 2019 Khyber Pakhtunkhwa provincial election on 20 July 2019 from constituency PK-102 (Bajaur-III) on the ticket of Jamaat-e-Islami Pakistan. He won the election by the majority of 5,652 votes over the runner up Hameedur Rehman of Pakistan Tehreek-e-Insaf. He garnered 19,088 votes while Rehman received 13,436 votes.
