= PK-110 Lower South Waziristan =

Pakistani political constituency

- Constituency for the Khyber Pakhtunkhwa Assembly
- Region: Lower South Waziristan District

Current constituency
- Created: 2019
- Party: Pakistan Tehreek-e-Insaf
- Member: Naseerullah Wazir
- Created from: PK-114 South Waziristan-II (2019-2023)

PK-110 Lower South Waziristan (پی کے-110، زیریں جنوبی وزیرستان) is a constituency for the Khyber Pakhtunkhwa Assembly of the Khyber Pakhtunkhwa province of Pakistan.

== Members of Assembly ==
=== 2019-2023: PK-114 South Waziristan-II ===
Election	Member	Party
2019	Naseerullah Wazir	PTI

== Election 2019 ==
After merger of FATA with Khyber Pakhtunkhwa provincial elections were held for the very first time. PTI Candidate Naseer Ullah Khan won the seat by getting 11,114 votes.

Provincial election 2019: PK-114 South Waziristan-II
Party	Candidate	Votes	%
PTI	Naseerullah Wazir	11,114	29.81
Independent	Muhammad Arif	10,272	27.55
JUI (F)	Salekh	7,103	19.05
Independent	Ajab Gul	2,257	6.05
Independent	Yar Muhammad	1,553	4.17
PPP	Imran ullah	1,051	2.82
Independent	Zubair Khan	987	2.65
ANP	Taj Muhammad	928	2.49
Independent	Abdullah	699	1.88
Independent	Muhammad Anwar Khan	699	1.88
Independent	Hafiz ul Amin	106	0.28
Independent	Muhammad Ghulab	82	0.22
JI	Saif ur Rehman	81	0.22
Independent	Others (8 Independents)	347	0.93
Turnout		38,044	22.65
Valid ballots		37,279	97.98
Rejected ballots		765	2.02
Majority		842	2.26
Registered electors		1,67,980	
PTI win (new seat)			

== See also ==
- PK-109 Upper South Waziristan
- PK-111 Dera Ismail Khan-I
