= Hafiz Assamuddin =

Pakistani politician

Member-elect of the Provincial Assembly of Khyber Pakhtunkhwa
- In office 27 August 2019 – 18 January 2023
- Constituency: PK-113 (South Waziristan-I)

Personal details
- Born: South Waziristan District, Khyber Pakhtunkhwa, Pakistan
- Party: Jamiat Ulema-e-Islam (F) (2019-present)

Hafiz Assamuddin is a Pakistani politician who was a member of the Provincial Assembly of Khyber Pakhtunkhwa from August 2019 to January 2023.

== Political career ==
Assamuddin contested the 2019 Khyber Pakhtunkhwa provincial election on 20 July 2019 from constituency PK-113 (South Waziristan-I) on the ticket of Jamiat Ulema-e-Islam (F). He won the election by the majority of 5,216 votes over the runner up Afsar Khan of Pakistan Tehreek-e-Insaf. He garnered 10,356 votes while Khan received 5,140 votes.

== See also ==
- List of Deobandis
