= Noor-ul-Haq Qadri =

Pakistani politician

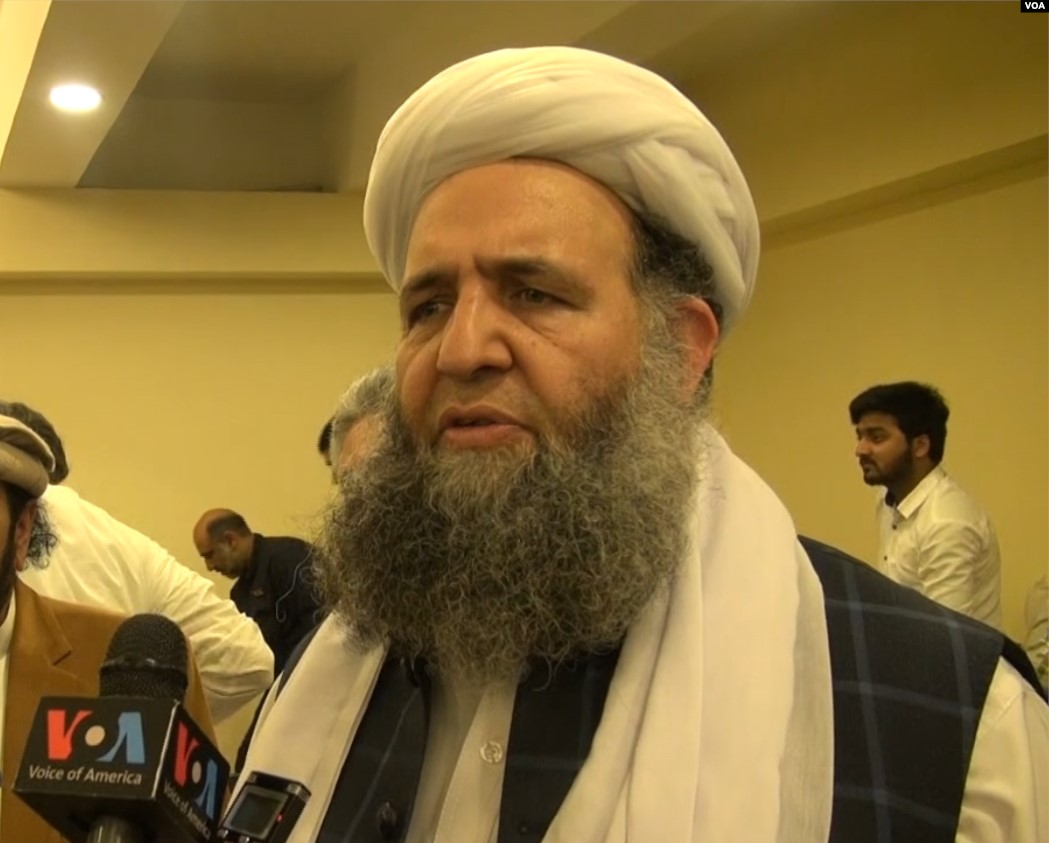

Minister for Religious Affairs and Inter-faith Harmony
- In office 20 August 2018 – 10 April 2022
- President: Mamnoon Hussain; Arif Alvi
- Prime Minister: Imran Khan
- Preceded by: Muhammad Yusuf Shaikh (caretaker)
- Succeeded by: Abdul Shakoor

Member for the Senate of Pakistan
- Incumbent
- Assumed office 25 July 2025
- Constituency: General Seat from Khyber Pakhtunkhwa

Member of the National Assembly of Pakistan
- In office 13 August 2018 – 17 January 2023
- Constituency: NA-43 (Tribal Area-IV)
- In office 2002–2013
- Constituency: NA-45 (Tribal Area-X)

President of PTI Erstwhile FATA
- Incumbent
- Assumed office 16 January 2023
- Chairman: Imran Khan; Gohar Ali Khan

Personal details
- Party: PTI (2017-present)
- Other political affiliations: IND (2002-2013)
- Relations: Muhammad Adnan Qadri (nephew)

Noor-ul-Haq Qadri is a Pakistani Barelvi Islamic scholar and a politician who was Federal Minister for Religious Affairs and Inter-faith Harmony from 20 August 2018 to 10 April 2022.

He had been a member of the National Assembly of Pakistan from August 2018 till January 2023.

Previously, he was a member of the National Assembly from 2002 to 2013.

== Personal life ==
Qadri has earned a Doctor of Philosophy (PhD) in Islamic Studies from Minhaj University, Lahore.

A Sunni, he belongs to the Barelvi school of thought. He is a prominent religious figure in Landi Kotal and has a large following. His brother Hafiz Abdul Malik is also a politician, having been a senator.

== Political career ==
He was elected to the National Assembly of Pakistan from Constituency NA-45 (Tribal Area-X) as an independent candidate in the 2002 Pakistani general election. He received 9,121 votes and defeated an independent candidate, Ajab Khan Afridi. Reportedly, he served as Minister for Religious Affairs in the federal cabinet during the rule of former President Pervez Musharraf.

He was re-elected to the National Assembly from Constituency NA-45 (Tribal Area-X) as an independent candidate in the 2008 Pakistani general election. He received 13,876 votes and defeated an independent candidate, Mohammad Ibrahim Koki Khel. In November 2008, he was inducted into the federal cabinet of Prime Minister Yousaf Raza Gillani and was appointed as Federal Minister for Zakat and Ushr where he continued to serve until December 2010. He remained a member of the federal cabinet without portfolio from December 2010 to February 2011.

He ran for the seat of the National Assembly from Constituency NA-45 (Tribal Area-X) as an independent candidate in the 2013 Pakistani general election but was unsuccessful. He received 20,181 votes and lost the seat to Alhaj Shah Jee Gul Afridi.

He joined Pakistan Tehreek-e-Insaf (PTI) in November 2017.

He was re-elected to the National Assembly as a candidate of PTI from Constituency NA-43 (Tribal Area-IV) in the 2018 Pakistani general election. He received 33,243 votes and defeated Alhaj Shah Jee Gul Afridi.

=== Ministerial achievements and roles ===
On 18 August, Imran Khan formally announced his federal cabinet structure and Qadri was named as Minister for Religious Affairs and Inter-faith Harmony. On 20 August 2018, he was sworn in as Federal Minister for Religious Affairs and Inter-faith Harmony in the federal cabinet of Prime Minister Imran Khan. In his ministerial position (20 August 2018 – 10 April 2022), Dr. Qadri implemented several key initiatives:

On 29 December 2021, Qadri chaired the inaugural session of the Pakistan Hindu Temple Management Committee—the first state-led body to oversee Hindu places of worship. He highlighted its role as “a bridge between the non‑Muslim population and the state.”

He condemned the Karak temple attack on 30 December 2020, calling it “a conspiracy to undermine interfaith harmony.” A mob of 1,500 local Muslims led by a local Islamic cleric and the supporters of Jamiat Ulema-e-Islam (F) party had attacked and burnt the temple. He stressed that “damaging places of worship of non‑Muslims is against the teachings of Islam” and urged authorities to arrest the culprits.

Amid the Covid‑19 pandemic, Qadri managed the Hajj 2020 arrangements. On 19 March 2020, he announced that training programs for intending pilgrims were suspended, with approximately 179,210 Pakistanis registered under both government and private schemes.

Earlier in February 2020, Qadri reaffirmed the 2020 Hajj quota policy, specifying 107,526 pilgrims under the government plan and 71,684 via private operators, totaling 179,210 pilgrims, which included allocations for senior citizens.
