= Iqbal Mian =

Pakistani politician

Member of the Provincial Assembly of Khyber Pakhtunkhwa
- In office 27 August 2019 – 18 January 2023
- Constituency: PK-109 (Kurram-II)

Personal details
- Party: PTI-P (2023-present)
- Other political affiliations: PTI (2019-2023)

Syed Iqbal Mian is a Pakistani politician who was a member of the Provincial Assembly of Khyber Pakhtunkhwa from August 2019 to January 2023.

== Political career ==
Mian contested the 2019 Khyber Pakhtunkhwa provincial election on 20 July 2019 from constituency PK-109 (Kurram-II) on the ticket of Pakistan Tehreek-e-Insaf. He won the election by the majority of 16,852 votes over the independent runner up Inayat Ali Toori. He garnered 38,549 votes while Toori received 21,697 votes.
