= NA-27 Khyber =

Constituency of the National Assembly of Pakistan

- Constituency
- Region: Khyber District
- Electorate: 637,449

Current constituency
- Party: Sunni Ittehad Council
- Member: Mohammed Iqbal Khan Afridi
- Created from: NA-44 (Tribal Area-V) and NA-45 (Tribal Area-VI)

NA-27 Khyber (این اے-27، خیبر) is a constituency for the National Assembly of Pakistan comprising all of Khyber District.

== Members of Parliament ==
=== 2002–2018: NA-46 Tribal Area-XI ===
| Election | Member | Party |
|---|---|---|
| 2002 | Maulana Khalilur Rehman Afridi | Independent |
| 2008 | Hameed Ullah Jan Afridi | Independent |
| 2013 | Nasir Khan Afridi | Independent |

=== 2018–2022: NA-44 Tribal Area-V ===
| Election | Member | Party |
|---|---|---|
| 2018 | Mohammed Iqbal Khan Afridi | PTI |

=== 2023–present: NA-27 Khyber ===
| Election | Member | Party |
|---|---|---|
| 2024 | Mohammed Iqbal Khan Afridi | SIC |

== Election 2002 ==
General elections were held on 10 October 2002. Maulana Khalilur Rehman Afridi an independent candidate won by 5,611 votes.

== Election 2008 ==
The result of general election 2008 in this constituency is given below.

=== Result ===
Hamidullah Jan Afridi succeeded in the election 2008 and became the member of National Assembly.

General Election 2008: Tribal Area-XI
| Party | Candidate | Votes | % |
|---|---|---|---|
| Independent | Hamidullah Jan Afridi BQK | 5,660 | 28 |
| Independent | Mohammad Saeed Afridi BQK | 5,035 | 25 |
| Independent | Zaffarullah Khan MDK | 3,558 | 17 |
| Others | Others | 7,995 | 31 |

== Election 2013 ==
General elections were held on 11 May 2013. Nasir Khan Afridi, an independent candidate, won 4,135 votes and became the member of National Assembly.

== Election 2018 ==
General elections were held on 25 July 2018.

General election 2018: NA-44 (Tribal Area-V)
| Party | Candidate | Votes | % | ±% |
|---|---|---|---|---|
| PTI | Mohammed Iqbal Khan Afridi | 12,537 | 18.93 | |
| Independent | Hameed Ullah Jan Afridi | 9,042 | 13.66 | |
| Independent | Nawabzada Muhammad Shah | 6,367 | 9.62 | |
| PAIL | Attaullah Khan | 4,939 | 7.46 | |
| Independent | Mahroof Khan | 4,826 | 7.29 | |
| Independent | Shah Faisal Afridi | 4,703 | 7.10 | |
| Independent | Shamsuddin | 4,484 | 6.77 | |
| ANP | Imran Khan Afridi | 4,311 | 6.51 | |
| Independent | Muhammad Shafique | 2,262 | 3.42 | |
| Independent | Nasir Khan | 1,911 | 2.89 | |
| Independent | Jahangir Khan | 1,808 | 2.73 | |
| Independent | Dilshadullah | 1,693 | 2.56 | |
| PPP | Sohail Ahmed | 1,586 | 2.40 | |
| Independent | Malik Waris Khan | 1,251 | 1.89 | |
| JUI (S) | Izzatullah | 1,081 | 1.63 | |
| Independent | Muhammad Hussain Malik | 810 | 1.21 | |
| Others | Others (twenty-four candidates) | 2,604 | 3.93 | |
| Turnout | | 67,144 | 25.32 | |
| Total valid votes | | 66,215 | 98.62 | |
| Rejected ballots | | 929 | 1.38 | |
| Majority | | 3,495 | 5.27 | |
| Registered electors | | 265,217 | | |

== Election 2024 ==
General elections were held on 8 February 2024. Mohammed Iqbal Khan Afridi won the election with 85,647 votes.

General election 2024: NA-27 Khyber
| Party | Candidate | Votes | % | ±% |
|---|---|---|---|---|
| Independent | Mohammed Iqbal Khan Afridi (Note: Filed nomination papers as PTI candidate but ECP allowed him to run as an independent) | 85,647 | 62.99 | ▲44.06 |
| PML(N) | Shahjee Gul Afridi | 18,979 | 13.96 | N/A |
| JUI (F) | Hameed Ullah Jan Afridi | 15,164 | 11.15 | N/A |
| JI | Shah Faisal Afridi | 7,907 | 5.82 | N/A |
| Others | Others (ten candidates) | 8,268 | 6.08 | |
| Turnout | | 140,128 | 21.98 | ▼3.34 |
| Total valid votes | | 135,965 | 97.03 | |
| Rejected ballots | | 4,163 | 2.97 | |
| Majority | | 66,668 | 49.03 | |
| Registered electors | | 637,449 | | |

== See also ==
- NA-26 Mohmand
- NA-28 Peshawar-I
