= Mehboob Sher =

Pakistani politician

Member of the Provincial Assembly of Khyber Pakhtunkhwa
- Incumbent
- Assumed office 29 February 2024
- Constituency: PK-67 Mohmand-I

Personal details
- Born: Mohmand District, Khyber Pakhtunkhwa, Pakistan
- Political party: PTI (2024-present)

Mehboob Sher is a Pakistani politician from Mohmand District. He is currently serving as a member of the Provincial Assembly of Khyber Pakhtunkhwa since February 2024.

== Career ==
He contested the 2024 general elections as a Pakistan Tehreek-e-Insaf/Independent candidate from PK-67 Mohmand-I. He secured 15,127 votes while the runner-up was Nisar Ahmed of ANP who secured 7,413 votes.
