= Haji Momin Khan Afridi =

Pakistani politician

Senator Haji Momin Khan Afridi

Member of the Senate of Pakistan
- In office March 2015 – March 2021

Personal details
- Relatives: Nasir Khan Afridi (brother)

Haji Momin Khan Afridi (Urdu: حاجی مومن خان آفریدی) is a Pakistani politician who has been a member of Senate of Pakistan since March 2015.

== Family ==
He is brother of Nasir Khan Afridi.

== Political career ==
He was elected to the Senate of Pakistan as an independent candidate in the 2015 Pakistani Senate election.
