= Ajmal Khan Wazir =

Pakistani politician

Member of the Provincial Assembly of Khyber Pakhtunkhwa
- In office 27 August 2019 – 18 January 2023
- Constituency: PK-101 (Bajaur-II)

Advisor to the Chief Minister of Khyber Pakhtunkhwa on Information
- In office 4 March 2020 – 11 July 2020
- Preceded by: Shaukat Ali Yousafzai
- Succeeded by: Kamran Khan Bangash

Ajmal Khan Wazir (اجمل خان وزیر) is a Pakistani politician and former advisor to Chief Minister of Khyber Pakhtunkhwa on Information and Public Relations. He had been a member of the Provincial Assembly of Khyber Pakhtunkhwa from August 2019 to January 2023. He joined the Pakistan Tehreek-e-Insaf (PTI) on 18 July 2018. He was part of the Pakistan Muslim League (Q) before joining the PTI. He hails from South Waziristan, Khyber Pakhtunkhwa. Wazir previously served as the adviser to the Chief Minister on Merged Districts.

== Political career ==
Ajmal Khan contested the 2019 Khyber Pakhtunkhwa provincial election from PK-101 Bajaur-II on the as a candidate of the Pakistan Tehreek-e-Insaf (PTI). He won the election by a majority of 1,726 votes over the runner up Sahibzada Haroonur Rasheed of the Jamaat-e-Islami Pakistan. He garnered 12,194 votes while Rasheed received 10,468 votes.

On 20 May 2023, he left the PTI due to the 2023 Pakistani protests.

== Leaked Audio Clip Controversy ==
In July 2020, Wazir was removed from his position as information adviser after a leaked audio clip surfaced in social media where Wazir was allegedly taking commissions from an advertising firm. Soon after a high level committee was formed on 14 July 2020 to investigate Ajmal Wazir's controversial audio clip. In May 2021 the committee announced the findings of investigations about Wazir's alleged leaked audio clip regarding commission for a deal with an advertising agency. Former KP spokesperson Ajmal Wazir cleared of corruption charges. The commission could not confirm the veracity of the audio tape. It could also not establish Wazir's link with the audio clip either.
