= PK-71 Khyber-III =

Pakistani political constituency

- Constituency for the Khyber Pakhtunkhwa Assembly
- Region: Fort Salop and Bara Tehsils (partly) of Khyber District

Current constituency
- Created: 2018
- Party: Pakistan Tehreek-e-Insaf
- Member: Abdul Ghani
- Created from: PK-107 Khyber-III (2018-2023)

PK-71 Khyber-III (پی کے-71 خیبر-3) is a constituency for the Khyber Pakhtunkhwa Assembly of the Khyber Pakhtunkhwa province of Pakistan. It was created in 2018 after merger of FATA with Khyber Pakhtunkhwa before 2019 elections.

== Members of Assembly ==
=== 2019-2023: PK-107 Khyber-III ===
Election	Member	Party
2019	Muhammad Shafiq Afridi	PTI

== Election 2019 ==
After merger of FATA with Khyber Pakhtunkhwa provincial elections were held for the very first time. Independent candidate Muhammad Shafiq Afridi won the seat by getting 9,796 votes. He later joined Pakistan Tehreek-e-Insaf.

Provincial election 2019: PK-107 Khyber-III
Party	Candidate	Votes	%
Independent	Muhammad Shafiq Afridi	9,796	26.15
Independent	Hameed Ullah Jan Afridi	8,473	22.62
PTI	Muhammad Zubair	6,391	17.06
JI	Shah Faisal Afridi	4,923	13.14
JUI (F)	Shams ud Din	3,298	8.81
Independent	Nawabzada Muhammad Shah	2,331	6.22
Independent	Haroon Afridi	941	2.51
Independent	Danish Khan Afridi	498	1.33
ANP	Muhammad Sadiq	396	1.06
Independent	Tahir Shah	211	0.56
Independent	Naimat Khan	64	0.17
PPP	Sohail Ahmed	56	0.15
Independent	Others (6 Independents)	77	0.20
Turnout		37,879	17.53
Valid ballots		37,455	98.98
Rejected ballots		424	1.02
Majority		1,323	3.53
Registered electors		2,16,133	
Independent win (new seat)			

== See also ==
- PK-70 Khyber-II
- PK-72 Peshawar-I
