= Safi Tehsil =

Safi Tehsil تحصیل صافی صافي تحصیل
- Tehsil
- Country: Pakistan
- Region: Khyber Pakhtunkhwa
- District: Mohmand District

Population (2017)
  - Total: 99,114
- Time zone: UTC+5 (PST)

Safi Tehsil is a subdivision located in Mohmand District, Khyber Pakhtunkhwa, Pakistan. The population is 99,114 according to the 2017 census.

In 2020 a landslide at a marble mine have been killed at least 19 people and more than 20 people were also injured.

== See also ==
- List of tehsils of Khyber Pakhtunkhwa
