= Nasir Khan Afridi =

Pakistani politician

- ناصر خان آفریدی

Member of the National Assembly of Pakistan
- In office 12 June 2013 – 31 May 2018
- Constituency: NA-46 (Khyber Agency)

Personal details
- Relatives: Haji Momin Khan Afridi (brother)

Nasir Khan Afridi (Urdu: ناصر خان آفریدی) is a Pakistani politician who had been a member of the National Assembly of Pakistan from June 2013 to May 2018.

He is brother of Haji Momin Khan Afridi.

== Political career ==
He was elected to the National Assembly of Pakistan as an independent candidate from Constituency NA-46 (Tribal Area-XI) in the 2013 Pakistani general election. He received 4,135 votes and defeated Muhammad Iqbal Khan, a candidate of Pakistan Tehreek-e-Insaf.

In 2014, an election tribunal declared the election null and void and ordered a re-election in the constituency. His National Assembly membership was later restored by the court.
