= Ghalanai =

Ghalanai غلنئی غلنۍ
- Town
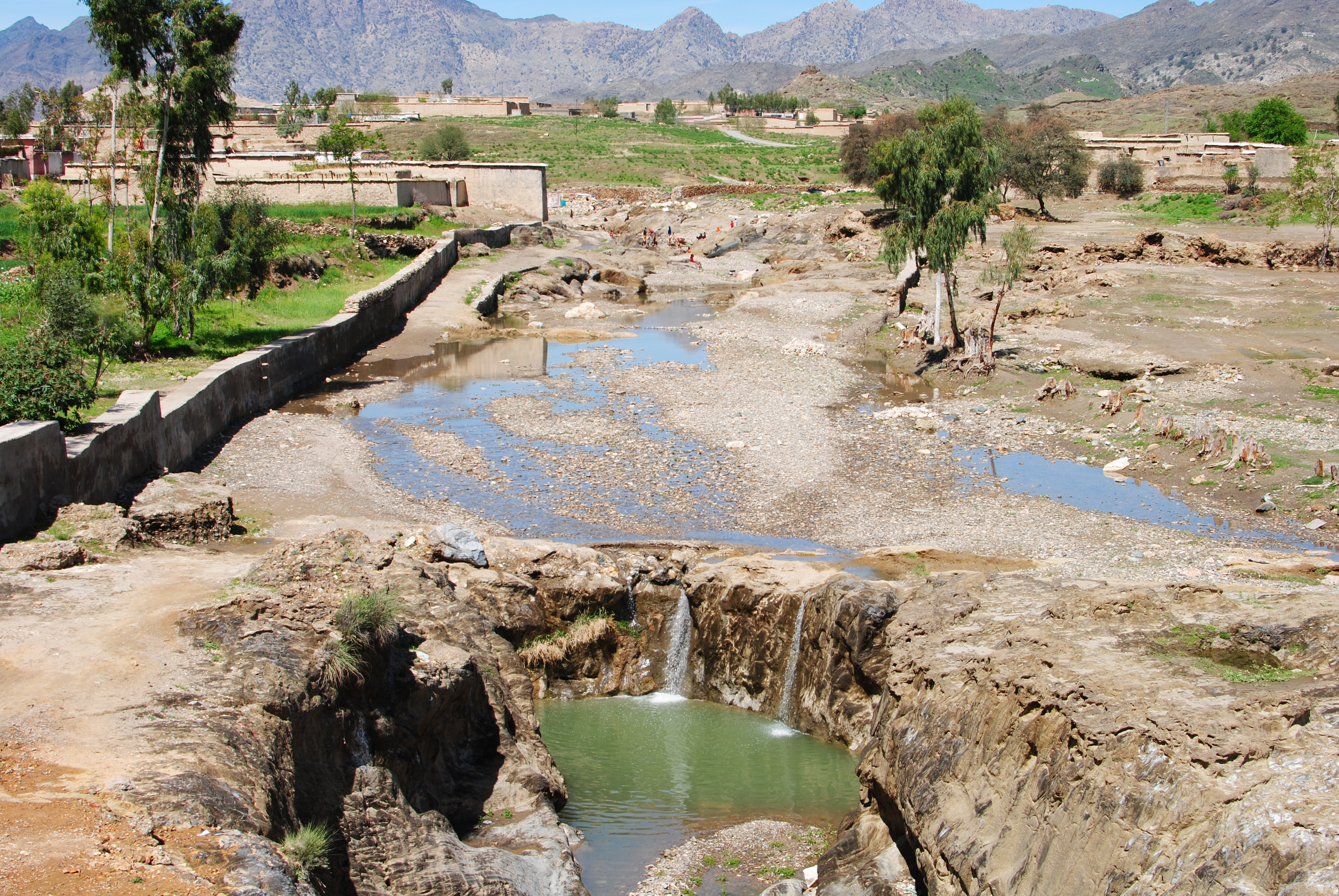

- Location within Khyber Pakhtunkhwa Location within Pakistan
- Coordinates: 34°19′27″N 71°23′54″E
- Country: Pakistan
- Territory: Federally Administered Tribal Areas
- Agency: Mohmand Agency
- Tehsil: Halim Zai
- Elevation: 651 m (2,136 ft)

Population (2017)
  - Total: 6,422
- Time zone: UTC+5 (PST)

Ghalanai (Pashto: غلنۍ, Urdu: غلنئی) is the largest town and headquarter of Mohmand District in Khyber Pakhtunkhwa province of Pakistan. It is located at 34°19'16N 71°24'0E with an altitude of 651 metres (2139 feet).

Ghalanai is expanding as its population are growing before 2001 only 3 to 4 small villages is transforming into a small town as it is now approximately merging all nearby villages like Dawatkor, Abakhail, Molyano Mandi or Sultani Mandi to the north and west respectively, while Sra Karapi to the south, being a District headquarter there are many government offices/institution including Rescue 1122, DHQ Hospital DPO office DC, AC's offices judicial building, TMA upper Mohmand, Forest Deportment, NADRA, Election commission office, and Post office etc,
