= Shafiq Sher Afridi =

Pakistani politician

Member of the Provincial Assembly of Khyber Pakhtunkhwa

Member of the U.S. House of Representatives from 's Khyber Agency district
- In office 27 August 2019 – 14 January 2023
- Succeeded by: Muhammad Adnan Qadri
- Constituency: PK-105 (Khyber-I)

Personal details
- Born: Shahkas Khyber Agency
- Citizenship: Pakistani
- Party: AP (2025-present)
- Other party: PMLN (2023-2025); BAP (2019-2023)
- Relations: Senator Taj Muhammad Afridi ( Brother )
- Relatives: Shahjee Gul Afridi (uncle); Taj Muhammad Afridi (uncle); Bilawal Afridi (cousin)
- Occupation: Politician

Shafiq Sher Afridi is a Pakistani politician who had been a member of the Provincial Assembly of Khyber Pakhtunkhwa from August 2019 till January 2023.

== Political career ==
Afridi contested the 2019 Khyber Pakhtunkhwa provincial election on 20 July 2019 from constituency PK-105 (Khyber-I) as an independent. He won the election by the majority of 11,368 votes over the runner up Shermat Khan, also an independent. He garnered 18,135 votes while Khan received 6,767 votes.
