= Malik Abbas Rehman =

Pakistani politician

Member of the Provincial Assembly of Khyber Pakhtunkhwa
- In office 27 August 2019 – 18 January 2023
- Constituency: PK-104 (Mohmand-II)

Personal details
- Party: Balochistan Awami Party

Malik Abbas Rehman is a Pakistani politician who was a member of the Provincial Assembly of Khyber Pakhtunkhwa from August 2019 to January 2023.

== Political career ==
Rehman contested the 2019 Khyber Pakhtunkhwa provincial election on 20 July 2019 from constituency PK-104 (Mohmand-II) as an independent. He won the election by the majority of 1,950 votes over the runner up Muhammad Arif of Jamiat Ulema-e-Islam (F). He garnered 11,751 votes while Arif received 9,801 votes.
