= Nisar Mohmand =

Pakistani politician

Member of the Provincial Assembly of Khyber Pakhtunkhwa
- In office 27 August 2019 – 18 January 2023
- Constituency: PK-103 (Mohmand-I)

Personal details
- Party: PMLN (2025-present)
- Other political affiliations: ANP (2018-2025)

Nisar Mohmand is a Pakistani politician who was a member of the Provincial Assembly of Khyber Pakhtunkhwa from August 2019 to January 2023.

== Political career ==
Mohmand contested the 2019 Khyber Pakhtunkhwa provincial election on 20 July 2019 from constituency PK-103 (Mohmand-I) on the ticket of Awami National Party. He won the election by the majority of 1,464 votes over the runner up Rahim Shah of Pakistan Tehreek-e-Insaf. He garnered 11,064 votes while Shah received 9,600 votes.
