= Hameed Ullah Jan Afridi =

Pakistani politician

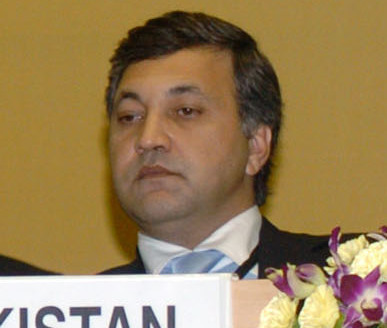

Federal Minister for Environment
- In office March 2008 – February 2011
- Prime Minister: Yousaf Raza Gillani

Member of the National Assembly of Pakistan
- In office 2008–2013
- Constituency: NA-46 (Tribal Area-XI)

Personal details
- Party: TLP (2025-present)
- Other political affiliations: JUI (F) (2024-2025)

Hameed Ullah Jan Afridi is a Pakistani politician who had been a member of the National Assembly of Pakistan from 2008 to 2013.

== Political career ==
He was elected to the Senate of Pakistan in 2003 where he served until 2007.

He was elected to the National Assembly of Pakistan from Constituency NA-46 (Tribal Area-XI) as an independent candidate in the 2008 Pakistani general election. from 2008 to 2011. He received 5,660 votes and defeated an independent candidate, Mohammad Saeed Afridi. In March 2008, he was inducted into the federal cabinet of Prime Minister Yousaf Raza Gillani and was appointed as Federal Minister for Environment where he continued to serve until February 2011.

He ran for the seat of the National Assembly from Constituency NA-46 (Tribal Area-XI) as an independent candidate in the 2013 Pakistani general election but was unsuccessful. He received 3,342 votes and lost the seat to Nasir Khan Afridi.
