= Bilawal Afridi =

Pakistani politician

Member-elect of the Provincial Assembly of Khyber Pakhtunkhwa
- In office 27 August 2019 – 14 January 2023
- Constituency: PK-106 (Khyber-II)

Personal details
- Party: AP (2025-present)
- Other political affiliations: PMLN (2023-2025); Tehreeke Islahate Pakistan (2023-2023); BAP (2019-2023)
- Parent: Shahjee Gul Afridi (father)
- Relatives: Taj Muhammad Afridi (uncle); Shafiq Sher Afridi (cousin)

Bilawal Afridi is a Pakistani politician who had been a member of the Provincial Assembly of Khyber Pakhtunkhwa from August 2019 till January 2023.

== Political career ==
Afridi contested the 2019 Khyber Pakhtunkhwa provincial election on 20 July 2019 from constituency PK-106 (Khyber-II) as an Independent. He won the election by the majority of 6,349 votes over the runner up Amir Muhammad Khan Afridi of Pakistan Tehreek-e-Insaf. He garnered 12,800 votes while Amir Afridi received 6,551 votes.
