= Halim Zai Tehsil =

Halim Zai Tehsil تحصیل حلیم زئی حلیمزي تحصیل
- Tehsil
- Country: Pakistan
- Region: Khyber Pakhtunkhwa
- District: Mohmand District
- Seat: Ghalanai

Population (2017)
  - Total: 78,749
- Time zone: UTC+5 (PST)

Halim Zai Tehsil is a subdivision located in Mohmand District, Khyber Pakhtunkhwa, Pakistan. The population is 78,749 according to the 2017 census.

== See also ==
- Ghalanai
- Halimzai
- List of tehsils of Khyber Pakhtunkhwa
