= Khyber District =

Pakistani administrative area

Khyber District ضلع خیبر خېبر ولسوالۍ Khyber Agency خیبر ایجنسی خېبر ایجنسئ
- District of Khyber Pakhtunkhwa
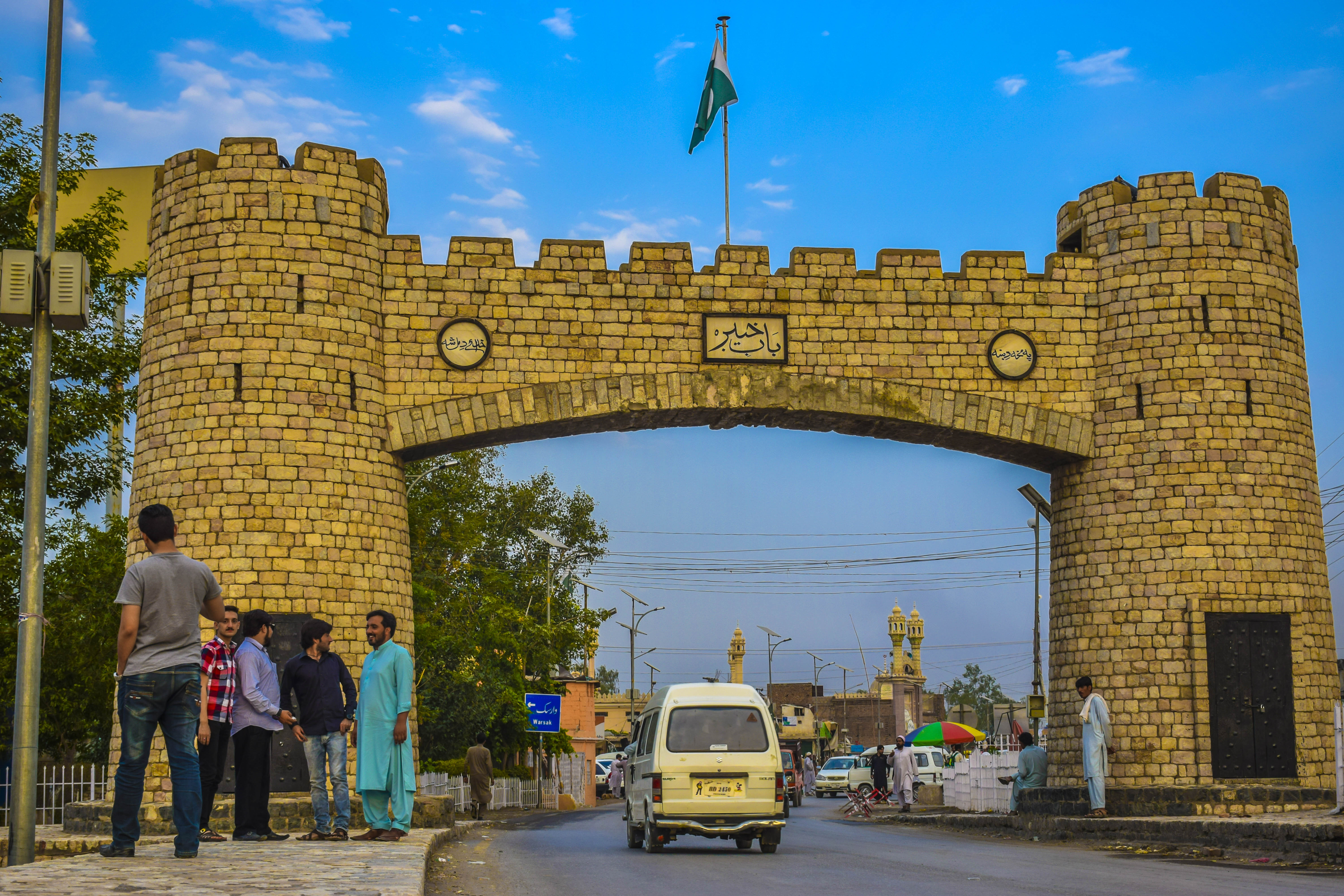
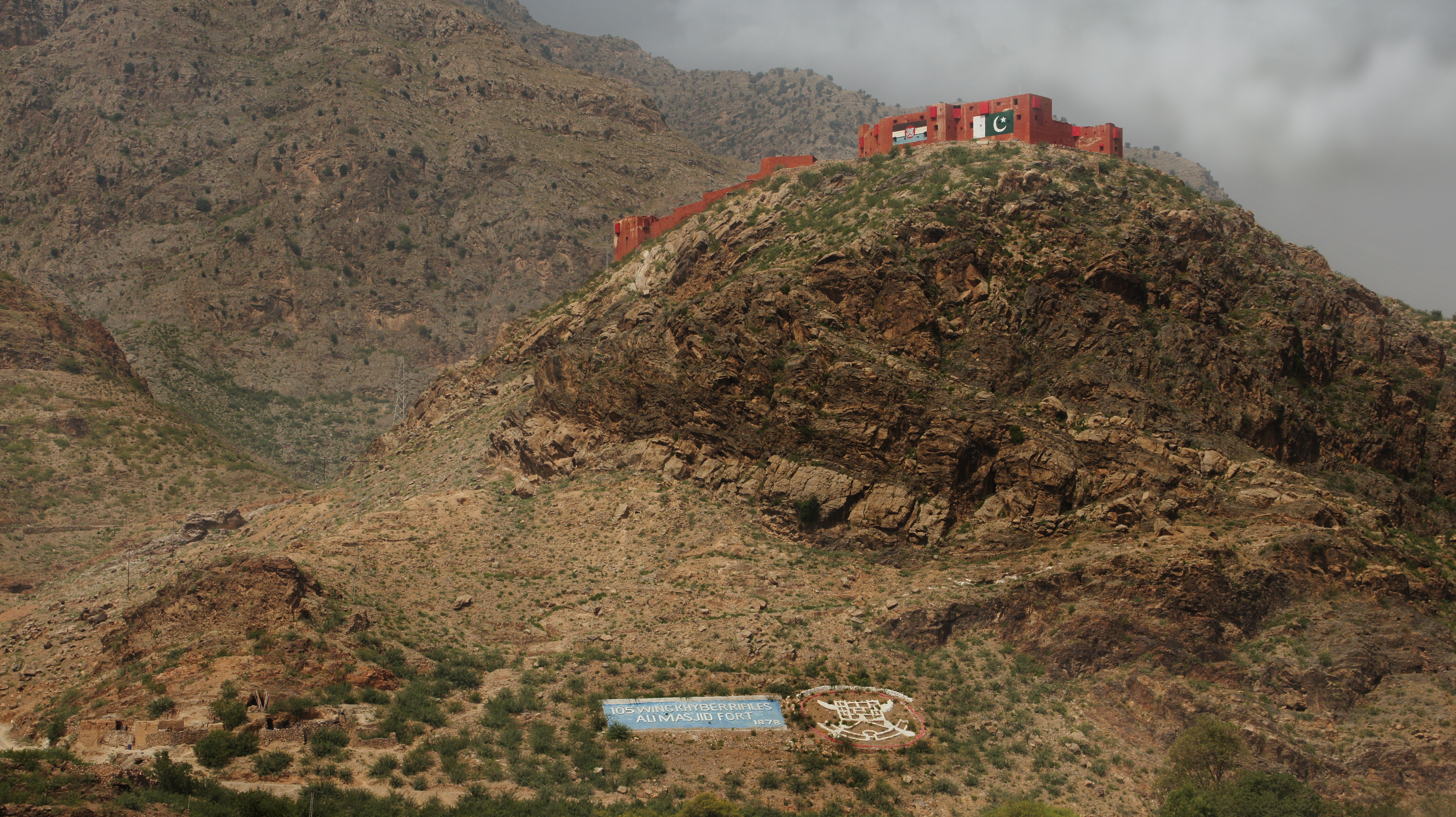
- Top: Bab-e-Khyber; Bottom: Ali Masjid Fort

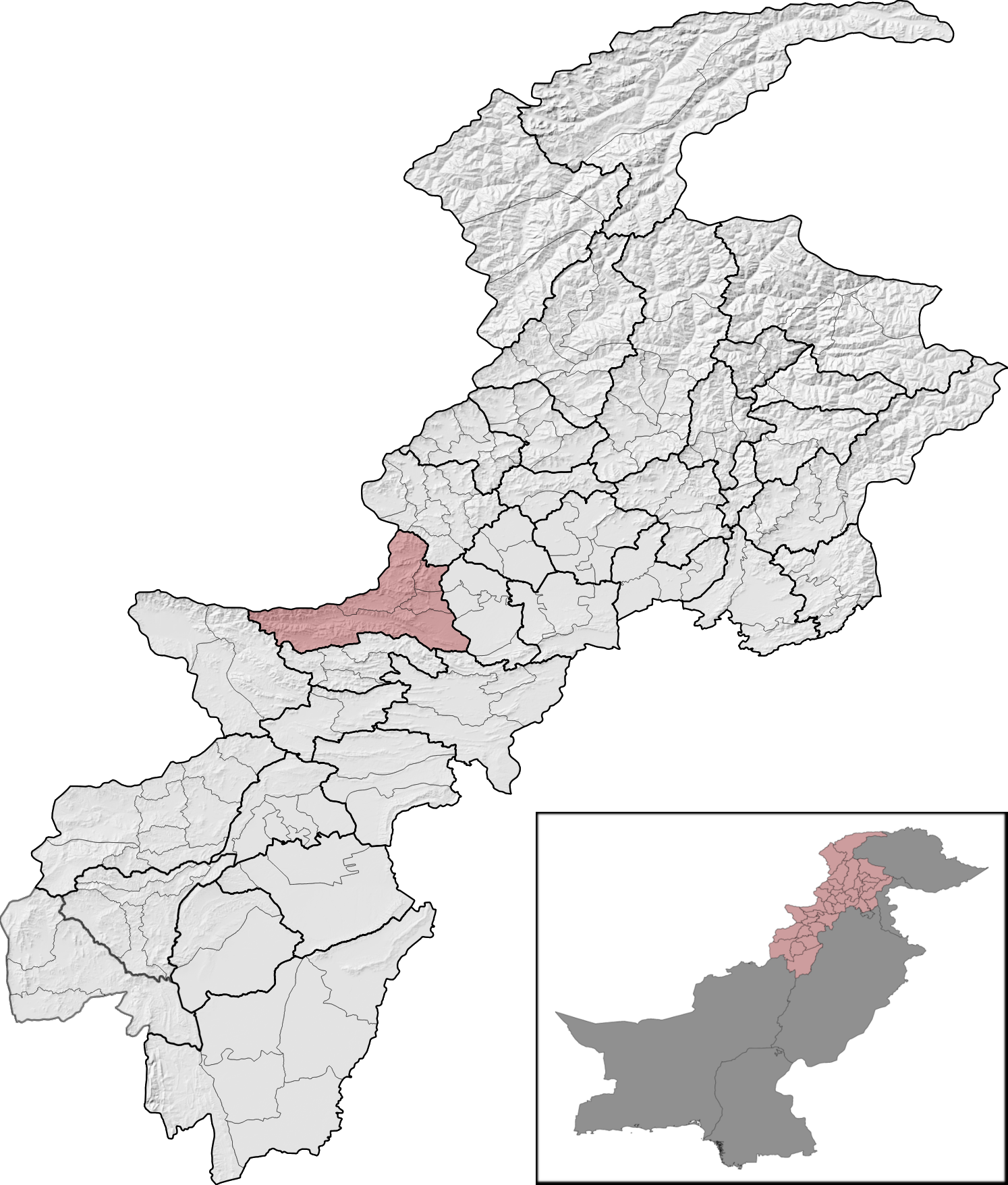
- Khyber District (red) in Khyber Pakhtunkhwa
- Country: Pakistan
- Province: Khyber Pakhtunkhwa
- Division: Peshawar
- Established: 1873 (as an agency of Federally Administered Tribal Areas)
- Headquarters: Landi Kotal

Government
  - Type: District Administration
  - Deputy Commissioner: Bilal Shahid Rao (BPS-18 PAS)
  - District Police Officer: Rai Mazhar Iqbal (BPS-18 PSP)
  - District Health Officer: N/A

Area
  - District of Khyber Pakhtunkhwa: 2,576 km^{2} (995 sq mi)

Population (2023)
  - District of Khyber Pakhtunkhwa: 1,146,267
  - Density: 445/km^{2} (1,150/sq mi)
  - Urban: 94,707
  - Rural: 1,051,560

Literacy
  - Literacy rate: Total: 38.45%; Male: 58.08%; Female: 17.16%
- Time zone: UTC+5 (PST)
- Main language(s): Pashto (99.6%)
- Number of Tehsils: 4
- Website: khyber.kp.gov.pk

Khyber District (Pashto: خېبر ولسوالۍ, Urdu: ضلع خیبر) is a district in the Peshawar Division of the Khyber Pakhtunkhwa province of Pakistan. Until 2018, it was an agency of the erstwhile Federally Administered Tribal Areas. With the merger of FATA with Khyber Pakhtunkhwa in 2018, it became a district. It ranges from the Tirah valley down to Peshawar. It borders Nangarhar Province of Afghanistan to the west, Orakzai District to the south, Kurram District to southwest, Peshawar to the east and Mohmand District to the north.

The majority of the district's population are Afridi, although other major clans in the District Khyber include the Shinwari, Mulagori and Shalmani.

All Afridi clans have their own areas in the Tirah Valley, and most of them extend down into the Khyber Pass over which they have always exercised the right of toll. The Malikdin Khel live in the centre of the Tirah and hold Bagh, the traditional meeting place of Afridi jirgas or assemblies. The Aka Khel are scattered in the hills south of Jamrud. All of this area is included in the Khyber Agency. The Adam Khel live in the hills between Peshawar and Kohat. Their preserve is the Kohat Pass in which several of the most important Afridi gun factories are located.

== Clans ==
The Afridi Tribe is subclassified into eight sub-tribes listed below.

- Kuki khel
- Qambar Khel
- Zakha Khel
- Kamar Khel
- Malikdin khel
- Aka Khel
- Sepah
- Adam Khel
- shlober
- aka khel

== Administration ==
Khyber District is currently subdivided into these tehsils.

| Tehsil | Area (km²) | Pop. (2023) | Density (ppl/km²) (2023) | Literacy rate (2023) | Union Councils |
|---|---|---|---|---|---|
| Bagh Maidan Tehsil | ... | ... | ... | ... | |
| Bara Tehsil | 1,430 | 548,084 | 383.28 | 34.72% | |
| Bazar Zakha Khel Tehsil | ... | ... | ... | ... | |
| Fort Salop Tehsil | ... | ... | ... | ... | |
| Jamrud Tehsil | 311 | 243,290 | 782.28 | 46.18% | |
| Landi Kotal Tehsil | 679 | 312,313 | 459.96 | 38.92% | |
| Mula Gori Tehsil | 156 | 42,580 | 272.95 | 38.36% | |
| Painda Cheena Tehsil | ... | ... | ... | ... | |

=== Provincial Assembly ===
| Member of Provincial Assembly | Party affiliation | Constituency | Year |
|---|---|---|---|
| Shafiq Sher Afridi | Balochistan Awami Party | PK-66 (Khyber-I) | 2019 |
| Bilawal Afridi | Balochistan Awami Party | PK-67 (Khyber-II) | 2019 |
| Muhammad Shafiq Afridi | Pakistan Tehreek-e-Insaf | PK-68 (Khyber-III) | 2019 |

== Khyber Pass ==
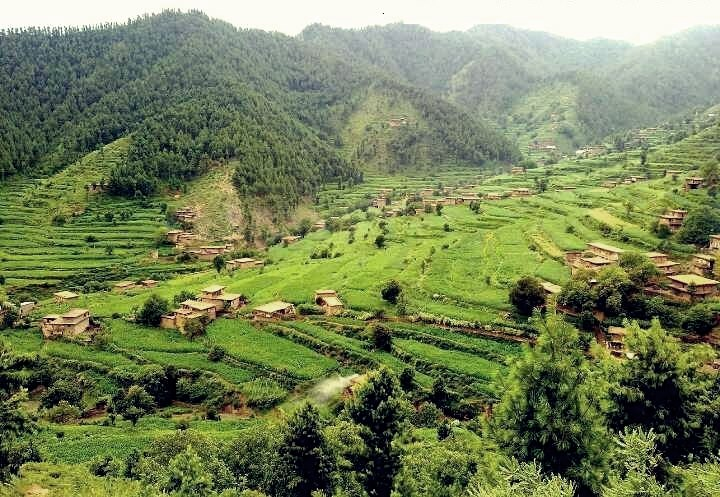
Portions of Khyber Agency are verdant.

Khyber Pass is a major feature of the Khyber District. Its narrowest point is at Ali Masjid, where the Battle of Ali Masjid occurred. The Khyber Rifles paramilitary organization originated in the area and took their name from it.

== Khyber Pass copy ==
A Khyber Pass copy is a homemade firearm characteristic of the Khyber area.

== Khyber Pass Railway ==
Both the Khyber Mail (passenger train) and the Khyber train safari routes passed through the Khyber District via the Khyber Pass. Khyber Pass Railway is a railway line in Pakistan.

== Education ==
Khyber Agency is the most literate of all the tribal areas, with a literacy rate of 34.2%, as of 2007 – quite far ahead of the next highest agency, Kurram, at 26.5%. It is also the only agency where the majority of its men are literate, at 57.2%, which is almost 20% ahead of the next highest agency, Kurram. However, its female literacy rate of 10.1% is second after Kurram's 14.4%.

| Agency | Literacy rate 2007 | | |
| Agency | Male | Female | Total |
|---|---|---|---|
| Khyber | 57.2% | 10.1% | 34.2% |

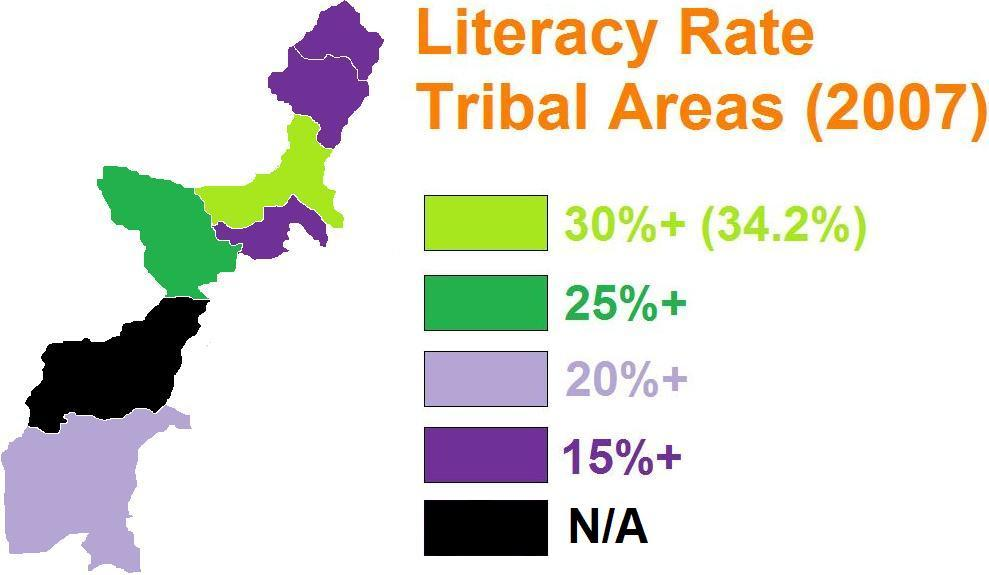
Literacy Map, Khyber Highest, Source:

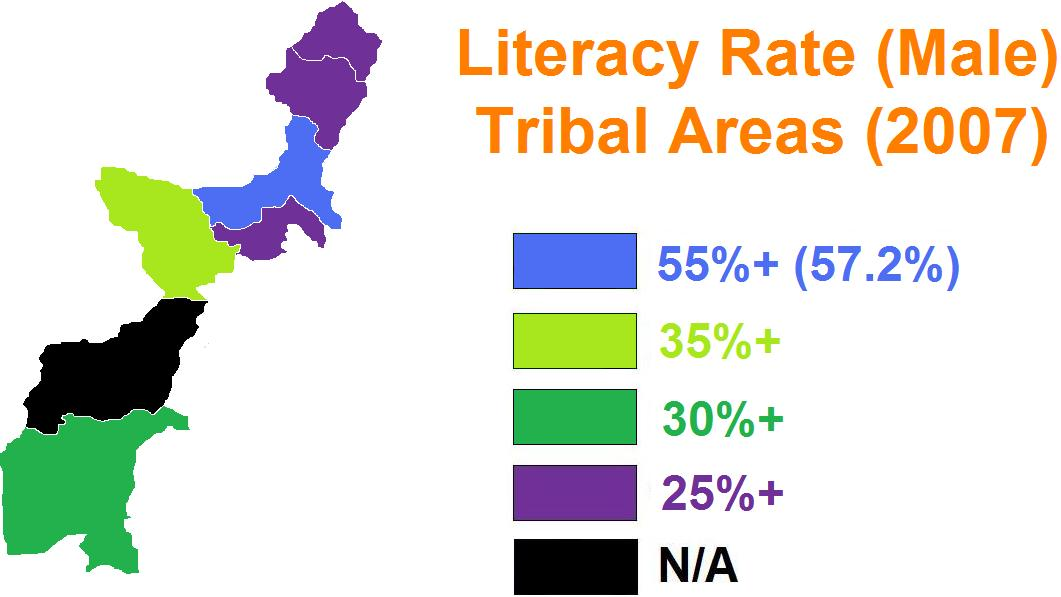
Literacy Map, Khyber Highest, Source:

== Demographics ==
Historical population
| Year | Pop. | ±% p.a. |
|---|---|---|
| 1951 | 216,622 | — |
| 1961 | 301,319 | +3.36% |
| 1972 | 378,032 | +2.08% |
| 1981 | 284,256 | −3.12% |
| 1998 | 546,730 | +3.92% |
| 2017 | 984,246 | +3.14% |
| 2023 | 1,146,267 | +2.57% |

As of the 2023 census, Khyber district has 166,805 households and a population of 1,146,267. The district has a sex ratio of 109.18 males to 100 females and a literacy rate of 38.45%: 58.08% for males and 17.16% for females. 395,308 (34.5% of the surveyed population) are under 10 years of age. 94,707 (8.26%) live in urban areas. 3,605 (0.39%) people in the district were religious minorities, mainly Christians. Pashto was the predominant language, spoken by 99.70% of the population.

The majority of the tribes in the Khyber District are Afridis. However, there are other tribes residing too. Those include Mullagori, Shilmani, Bangash and Shinwari.

== Insurgency ==
Tehrik-i-Taliban Pakistan, Lashkar-e-Islam and Tehreek-e-Nafaz-e-Shariat-e-Mohammadi militants began entering Khyber Agency after the US-led NATO invasion of Afghanistan in 2001. Due to the absence of a strong government and security network in the area and its rough mountainous terrain, the area became a hotbed of insurgents and over 90 percent of the agency came under their control in 2007. After 2007, the militants began attacking the government and military establishments in the KPK province, killing many people and wounding many more. The Pakistan Army began an operation in 2008 to clear the agency of militants and restore normal life in the area. The operation continued for years and resulted in the killing of hundreds of TTP militants and Pakistan Army soldiers. The local Aman Lashkars or peace committees supported the army by fighting the foreign terrorists. By July 2012, a major part of the district was cleared but military operation continued in Bara Tehsil of the district. The operation also produced a large number of internally displaced people. In October 2014, Pakistan Armed Forces launched a military offensive in Khyber Agency code-named Operation Khyber-1.

== Sports ==
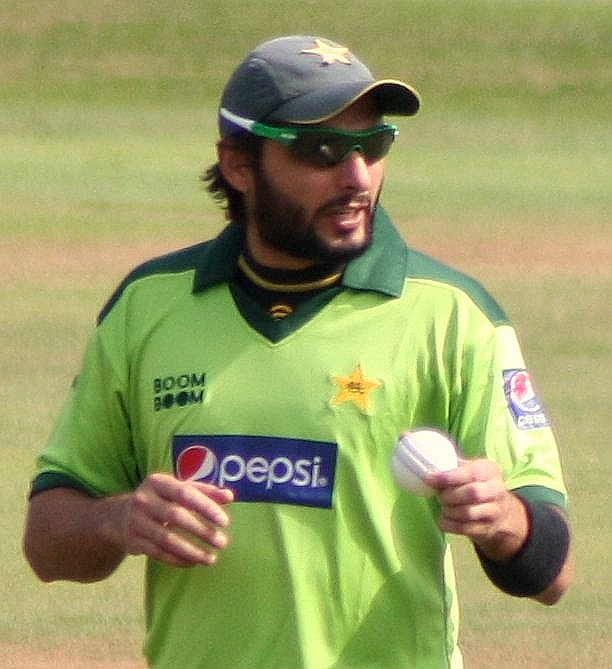
Shahid Afridi in the field during a cricket match.

Cricket is popular in Khyber District. Famous Pakistani cricketer Shahid Afridi and his son-in-law Shaheen Afridi are from the Khyber District.

== See also ==
- Khyber Pass Economic Corridor
