= Mohmand District =

District in Peshawar Division of Khyber Pakhtunkhwa, Pakistan

Mohmand District ضلع مہمند ده مومندو ولسوالۍ
- District of Khyber Pakhtunkhwa
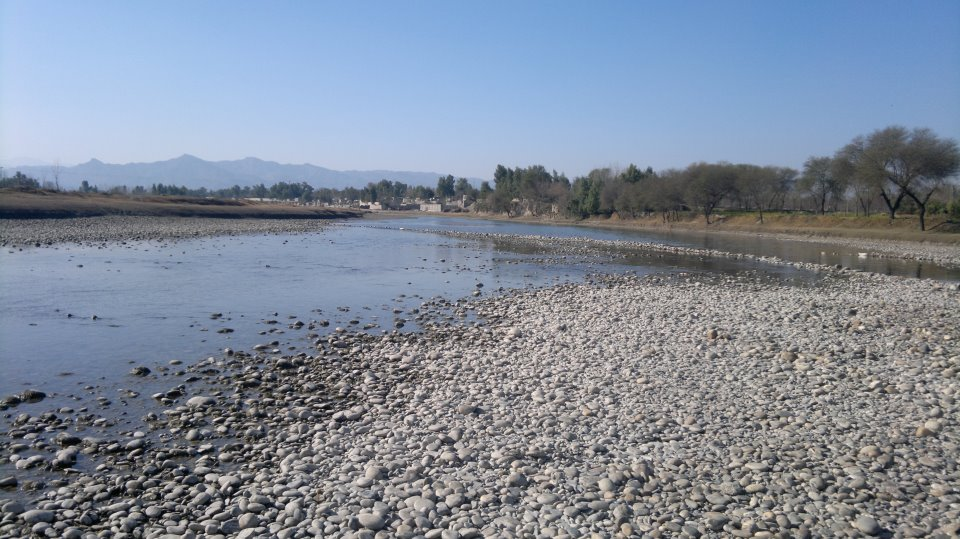
- View of Mohmand District

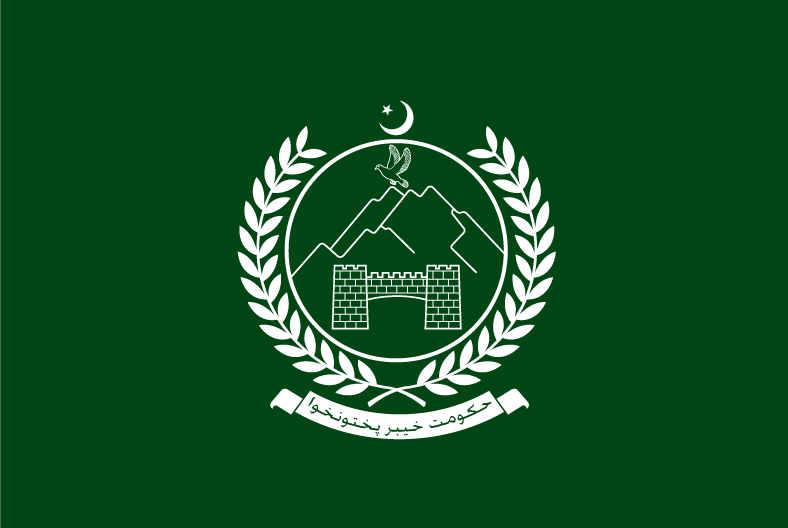
- Flag

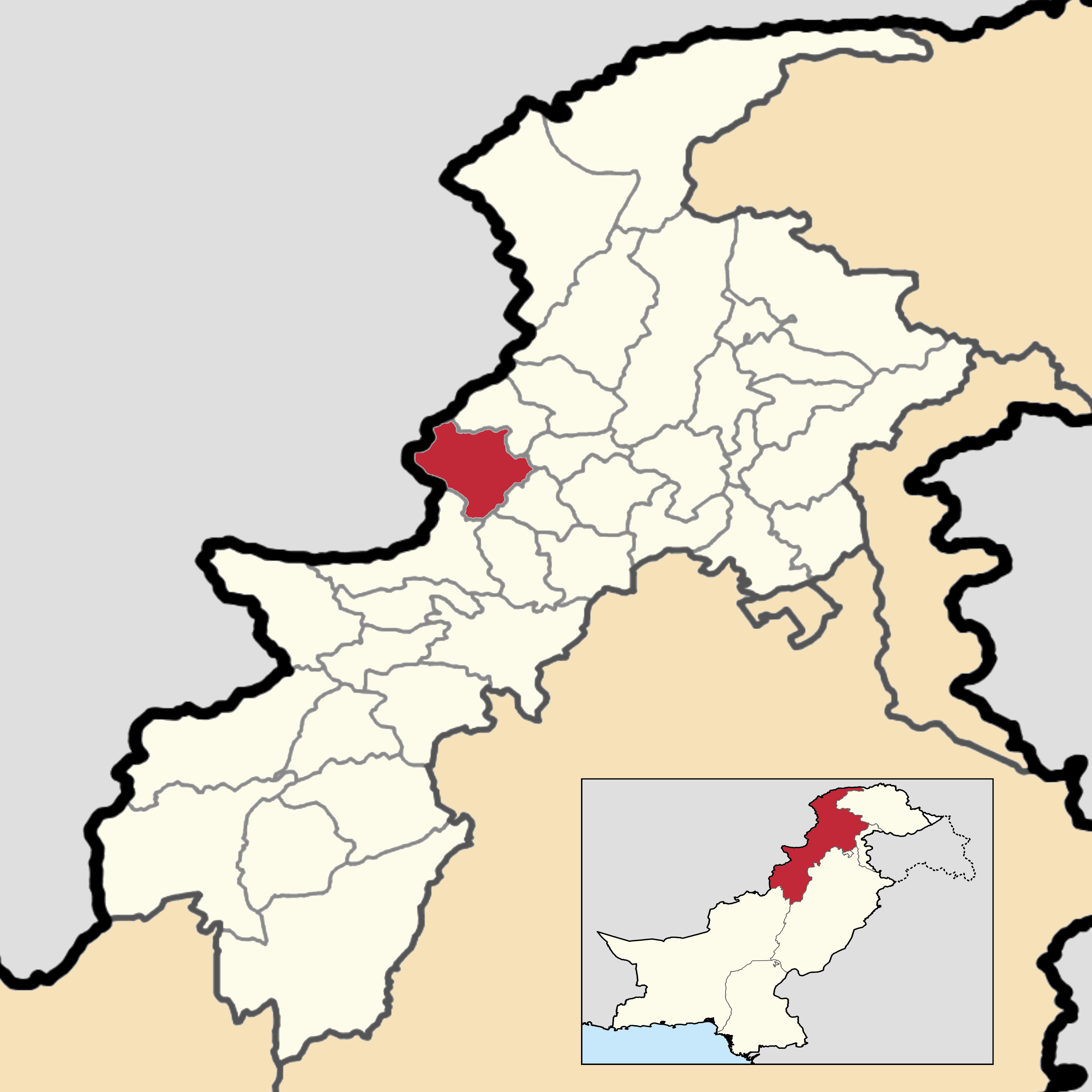
- Location of Mohmand District in Khyber Pakhtunkhwa
- Coordinates: 34°30′N 71°20′E
- Country: Pakistan
- Province: Khyber Pakhtunkhwa
- Division: Peshawar Division
- Established (Agency): 1951
- Upgraded to District: 2018
- District headquarters: Ghalanai
- Tehsils: 7: Ambar Utmankhel Halimzai Pindiali Prang Ghar Safi Upper Mohmand Yake Ghund tarakzai qasim khel srow kaly mazitabar and amantabar

Government
  - Type: District administration
  - Body: District administration
  - Deputy Commissioner (DC): Mansoor Arshad
  - District Police Officer (DPO): Vacant
  - District Health Officer (DHO): Vacant
  - District Education Officer (DEO): Vacant

Area
  - District of Khyber Pakhtunkhwa: 2,296 km^{2} (886 sq mi)

Population (2023 census)
  - District of Khyber Pakhtunkhwa: 553,933
  - Density: 241/km^{2} (620/sq mi)
  - Urban: 0
  - Rural: 553,933
  - Muslims: 553,933
  - Non-Muslims: 0

Languages
  - Official: English
  - National: Urdu
  - Native: Pashto

Ethnicity
  - Ethnicity: Pashtun
  - Tribal confederation: Ghoryakhel
  - Tribe: Mohmand
- Time zone: UTC+5 (PST)
- Postal code: 49750

Mohmand District (Pashto: ده مومندو ولسوالۍ, Urdu: ضلع مہمند) is a district of Khyber Pakhtunkhwa (Province of Pakistan). It is Situated in the Peshawar Division, it is bordered by Bajaur to the north, Khyber to the south, and districts of Malakand, Charsadda, and Peshawar to the east while to the west it shares international border with Nangarhar Province and Kunar Province of Afghanistan. It is known for its tribal Pashtun population, rugged terrain, mineral deposits (marble/chromite), and agriculture.

== Administration ==
It was Established in 1951 as an agency of Federally Administered Tribal Areas (FATA) and was administrated by Federal Government of Pakistan. On 31 May 2018, with the application of 25th Amendment, the Federally Administered Tribal Areas ceased to exist, and stood merged into neighbouring province of Khyber Pakhtunkhwa, while along with all other Seven Tribal Agencies,the status of Mohmand Agency was upgraded to District.

Mohmand District is currently subdivided into seven Tehsils organized into upper and lower subdivisions, while district headquarter is located in town of Ghalanai.

Tehsil	Name (Urdu) (Pashto)	Area (km²)	Pop. (2023)	Density (ppl/km²) (2023)	Literacy rate (2023)	Union Councils
Ambar Utman Khel Tehsil	(Urdu: تحصیل امبر اتمان خیل)(Pashto: امبر اتمان خېل تحصیل)	273	79,455	291.04	21.71%	
Halim Zai Tehsil	(Urdu: تحصیل حلیم زئی)(Pashto: حلیمزي تحصیل)	211	89,149	422.51	45.18%	
Pindiali Tehsil	(Urdu: تحصیل پنڈیالی)(Pashto: پنډیالي تحصیل)	454	112,247	247.24	29.11%	
Pran Ghar Tehsil	(Urdu: تحصیل پڑانگ غار)(Pashto: پړانګ غار تحصیل)	257	36,046	140.26	35.46%	
Safi Tehsil	(Urdu: تحصیل صافی)(Pashto: صافي تحصیل)	322	109,620	340.43	26.21%	
Upper Mohmand	(Urdu: تحصیل مہمند بالا)(Pashto: پورتنۍ مومندو تحصیل)	513	63,659	124.09	21.62%	
Yake Ghund Tehsil	(Urdu: تحصیل یکہ غنڈ)(Pashto: یکه غنډ تحصیل)	266	63,757	239.69	41.38%	

=== Provincial Assembly ===
Member of Provincial Assembly	Party affiliation	Constituency	Year
Mehboob Sher	Pakistan Tehreek-e-Insaf	PK-67 Mohmand-I	2024
Nisar Mohmand	Awami National Party	PK-64 Mohmand-I	2019
Malik Abbas Rehman	Balochistan Awami Party	PK-65 Mohmand-II	2019

== Demographics ==
Historical population
Year	Pop.	±% p.a.
1951	129,300	—
1961	294,215	+8.57%
1972	382,922	+2.42%
1981	163,933	−9.00%
1998	334,453	+4.28%
2017	474,345	+1.86%
2023	553,933	+2.62%

As of the 2023 census, Mohmand district has 63,973 households and a population of 553,933. The district has a sex ratio of 103.24 males to 100 females and a literacy rate of 31.28%: 46.85% for males and 15.10% for females. 191,753 (34.62% of the surveyed population) are under 10 years of age. The entire population lives in rural areas. 1,592 (0.29%) people in the district were from religious minorities, mainly Christians. Pashto was the predominant language, spoken by 99.80% of the population.

== War on Terror ==
Despite its attraction for tourists, Mohmand District has been an area of conflict between Pakistan Army and some militant groups.

On September 16, 2011, security forces cleared ninety percent of Mohmand District from the militants, normal life was restored and development activities were launched.

In 2012, the Pakistani Army declared full control of Mohmand District and de-notified it as a conflict zone and transferred its control to the Frontier Corps. However, terrorists continue to pose a threat to the peace by launching scattered terrorist attacks across from the Pakistan–Afghanistan border.

== 2020 Marble Mine Incident ==
In Safi Tehsil a marble mine collapsed and killed at least 19 people and more than 20 people were also injured.

== See also ==
- Elazay
- Mohmand Rifles
