= Osakai =

Village in Lower Dir District, Khyber Pakhtunkhwa, Pakistan

- Village
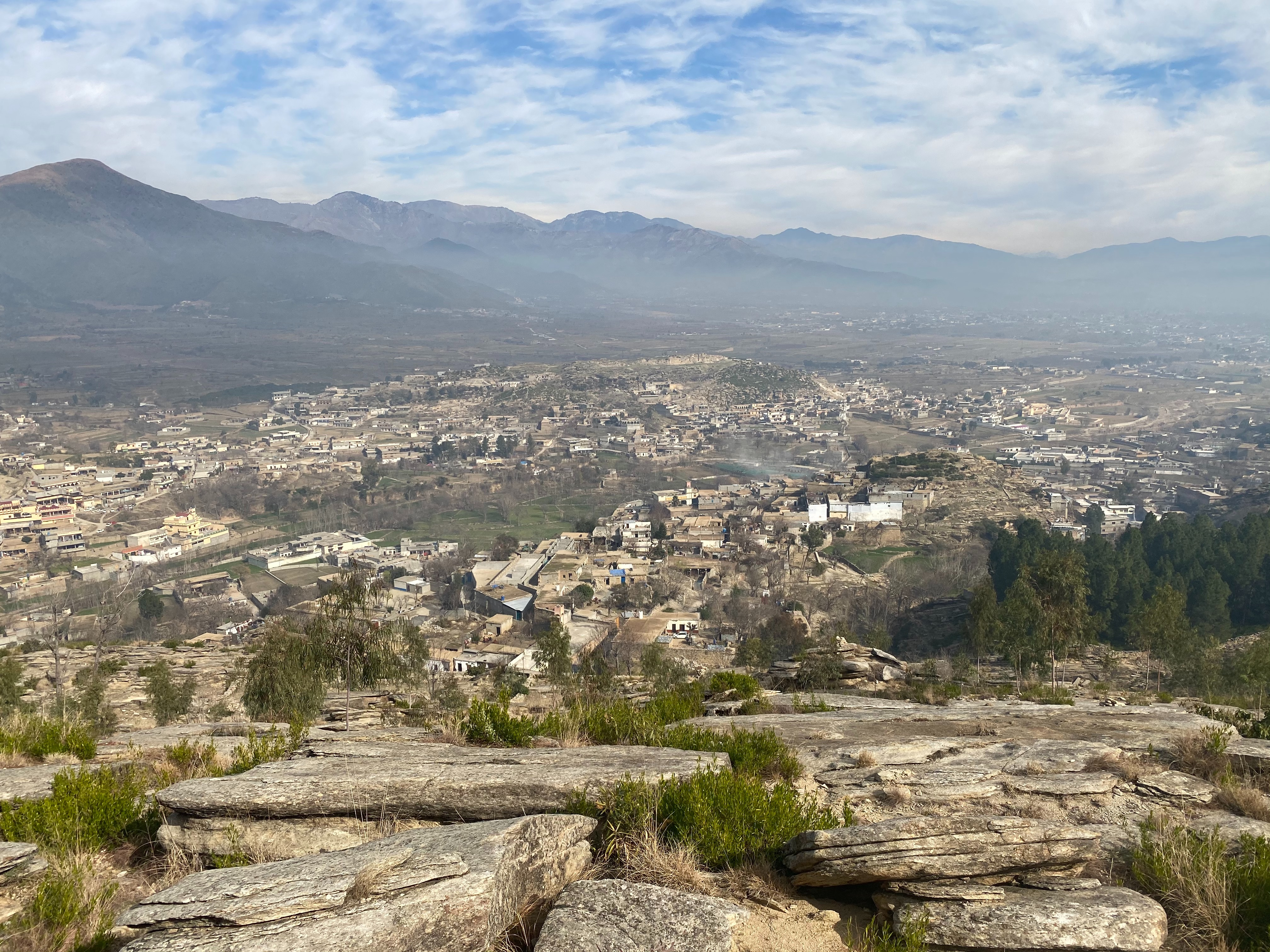
- Osakai

- Location within Khyber Pakhtunkhwa Location within Pakistan
- Coordinates: 34.71°N 71.97°E
- Pakistan: Pakistan
- Province: Khyber Pakhtunkhwa
- District: Lower Dir
- Tehsil: Adenzai

Population (2017 Census of Pakistan)
  - Total: 7,187
- Time zone: PST

Osakai is a village in Lower Dir District of the Khyber Pakhtunkhwa province of Pakistan. Osakai is divided into Osakai Bala and Osakai Payeen. It comes under Union Council Kotigram and under Adenzai Tehsil.

Osakai as a whole consists of Karimabad, Dagai, Ghwandai, Qazi Abad and Lowarha. Osakai has some historical places (e.g., Kafar Kot, nowadays known as Muslim Kot, Sroo Manroo (Red Fort), Shah Goo and also many picnic spots (e.g., Osakai waterfall, Khan Baba, Bar Charhay, and small water dams). Due to availability of almost all basic facilities many peoples from Lower Dir and Upper Dir and some other districts have started migration to this village. Large numbers of migrated families now reside in Kas and Muslim Kot. Osakai also has a quarry where stone slabs for graves are extracted. They can also be used for sewage systems.

Tribes in Osakai include Sarkani Khail, Roghani, Uthman Khail, Tajak, Degaan, Shinwari, Sadaat, Wardag, and Babakhail.

== Demography ==
Combined population of Osakai Bala (population: 3769) and Osakai Payeen (population: 3418) per 2017 Census of Pakistan is 7187.

== Occupations ==
The population of Osakai are doing business in Punjab, KPK and Sindh provinces and some people are working in Saudi Arabia. Small ratio of the population are farmers and labors.

== Public services and utilities ==
Osakai has a hospital unit, a government high school for girls and also a government high school for boys.

== Gallery ==
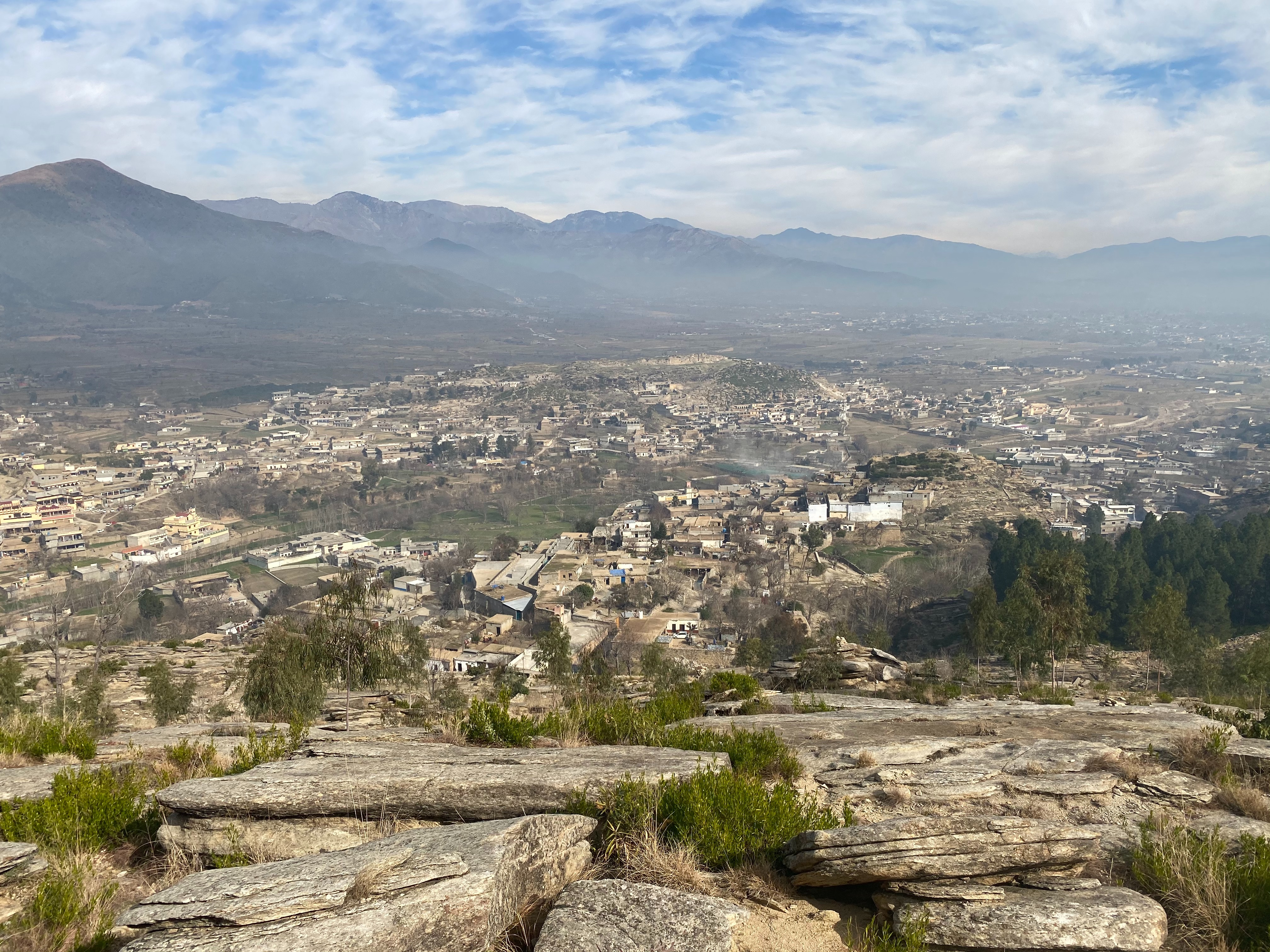
Osakai

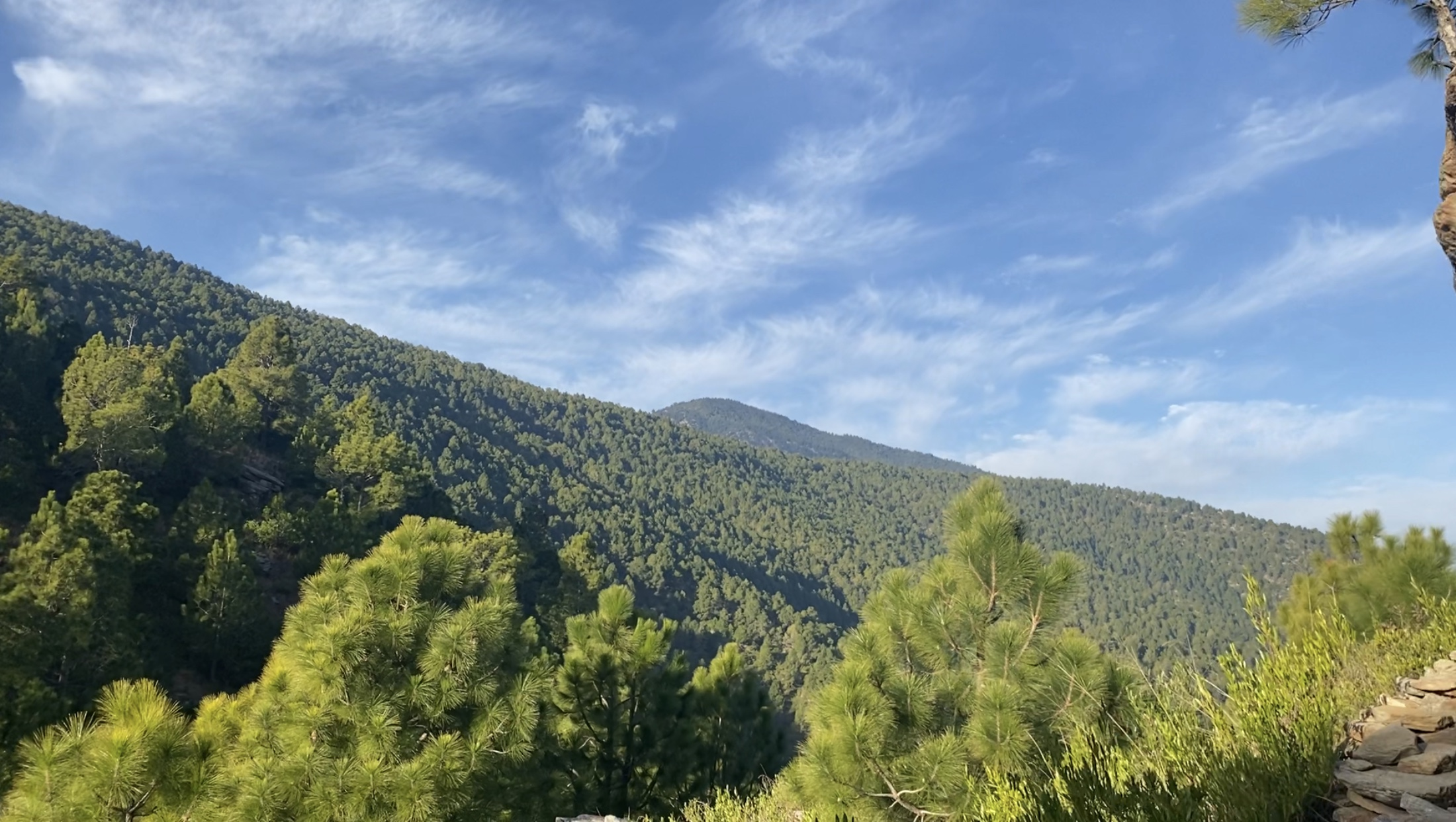
Osakai mountain

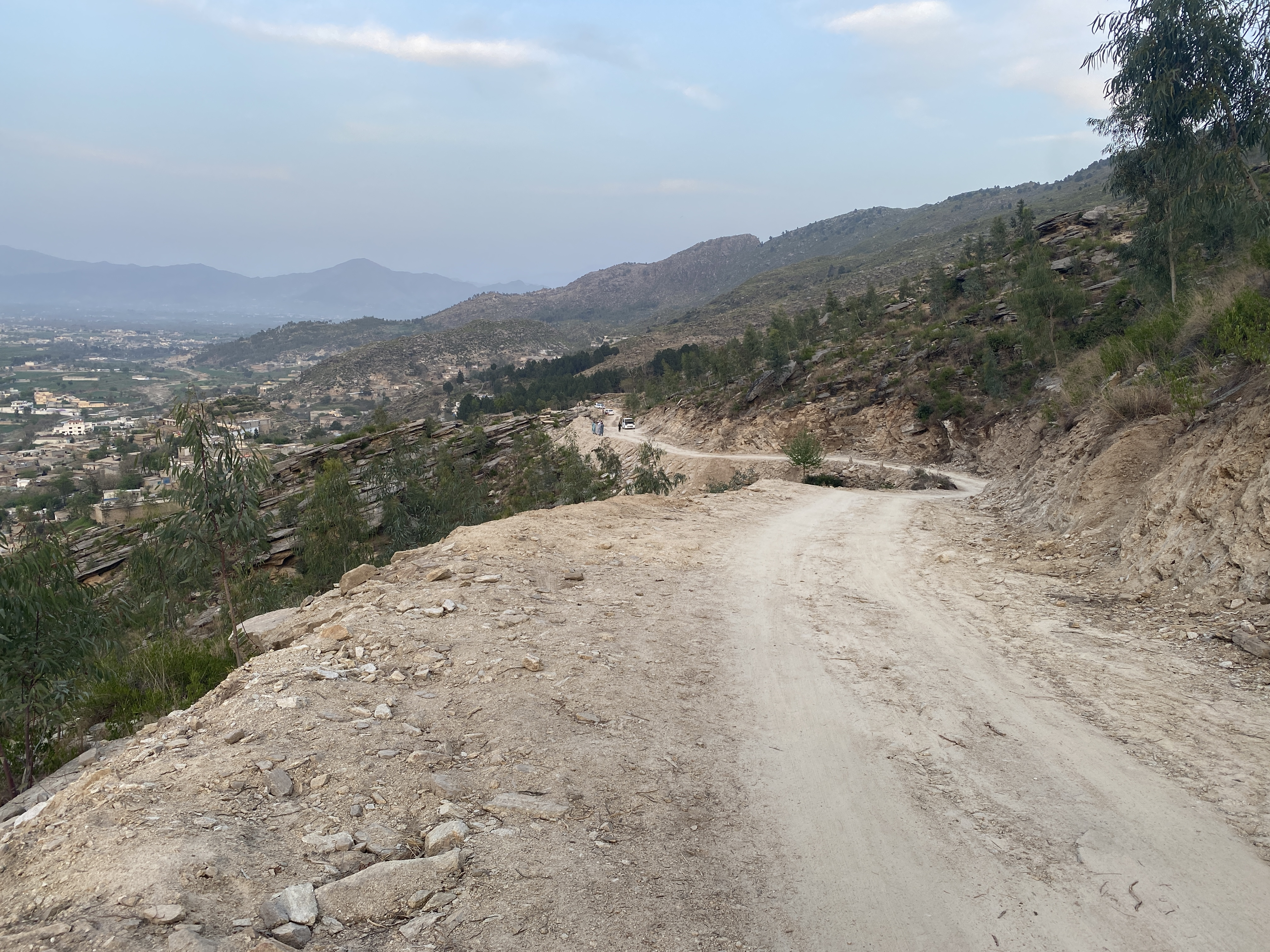
Road to Osakai Mountains

== See also ==
- Timergara
- Chakdara
- Swat District
