= NA-7 Lower Dir-II =

National Assembly constituency in Lower Dir District, Khyber Pakhtunkhwa, Pakistan

- Constituency for the National Assembly of Pakistan
- Region: Lal Qila Tehsil, Samarbagh Tehsil, Munda Tehsil, and Balambat Tehsil (partly) of Lower Dir District
- Electorate: 413,777

Current constituency
- Created: 2018
- Party: Pakistan Tehreek-e-Insaf
- Member: Mehboob Shah
- Created from: NA-34 (Lower Dir)

NA-7 Lower Dir-II (این اے-7، لور دیر-II) is a constituency of the National Assembly of Pakistan, located in Lower Dir District, Khyber Pakhtunkhwa. Created in 2018 through the delimitation of NA-34 (Lower Dir), which had covered most of Lower Dir District from 1977 to 2018, it comprises Lal Qila Tehsil, Samarbagh Tehsil, Munda Tehsil, and Balambat Tehsil excluding the Balambat and Rabat union councils. The remaining portion of the former NA-34 was reconstituted as NA-6 Lower Dir-I. At the 2024 general election the registered electorate stood at 413,777.

== Members of Parliament ==
=== 2018 to present: NA-7 Lower Dir-II ===
| Election | Member | Party |
|---|---|---|
| 2018 | Muhammad Bashir Khan | PTI |
| 2024 | Mehboob Shah | PTI |

== 2018 general election ==
General elections were held on 25 July 2018.

General election 2018: NA-7 Lower Dir-II
| Party | Candidate | Votes | % | ±% |
|---|---|---|---|---|
| PTI | Muhammad Bashir Khan | 63,017 | 43.11 | ▲12.93 |
| MMA | Siraj-ul-Haq | 46,040 | 31.50 | ▼16.73^{†} |
| Others | Others (six candidates) | 32,666 | 22.35 | |
| Turnout | | 146,178 | 44.22 | ▲14.07 |
| Rejected ballots | | 4,455 | 3.04 | |
| Majority | | 16,977 | 11.61 | |
| Registered electors | | 330,592 | | |
| PTI gain from JI | | | | |

^{†}JI and JUI-F contested as part of MMA

== 2024 general election ==
General elections were held on 8 February 2024. Mehboob Shah won the seat with 84,670 votes.

General election 2024: NA-7 Lower Dir-II
| Party | Candidate | Votes | % | ±% |
|---|---|---|---|---|
| PTI | Mehboob Shah (Note: Filed nomination papers as a PTI candidate but was required by the Election Commission of Pakistan to contest as an independent candidate.) | 84,670 | 49.03 | ▲5.92 |
| JI | Muhammad Ismail | 31,104 | 18.01 | N/A |
| PPP | Alam Zaib Khan | 20,464 | 11.85 | ▲4.80 |
| ANP | Zahid Khan | 16,653 | 9.64 | ▼4.18 |
| JUI (F) | Siraj Ud Din | 13,862 | 8.03 | N/A |
| Others | Others (eleven candidates) | 5,935 | 3.44 | |
| Turnout | | 176,936 | 42.76 | ▼1.46 |
| Rejected ballots | | 4,248 | 2.40 | |
| Majority | | 53,566 | 31.02 | ▲19.36 |
| Registered electors | | 413,777 | | |

== See also ==
- NA-6 Lower Dir-I
- NA-8 Bajaur
