= Badwan =

Union council of Pakistan

Coordinates: 34°38′49″N 71°58′00″E

Badwan (Pashto: باڈوان, Urdu: باڈوان) is a Union Council situated on the bank of the River Swat at an altitude of 2,192 feet (668 meters). It is a part of the Adenzai Tehsil of the Lower Dir District, Khyber-Pakhtunkhwa. It contains many small villages including Badwan Upper, Badwan Lower, Badwan Khambo, Shamlai, Baghkandi, Ramyal, Othar, Safrona, Gadar, Barorri, Leko, Ghwando, Torogato, Swato Banda, Ghazo etc. Its population is approximately 25,000.

In the past, Badwan was a part of a union council known as Khadagzai Abazai which comprised Badwan, Brangola and Khadagzai. Now, Badwan is a separate union council.

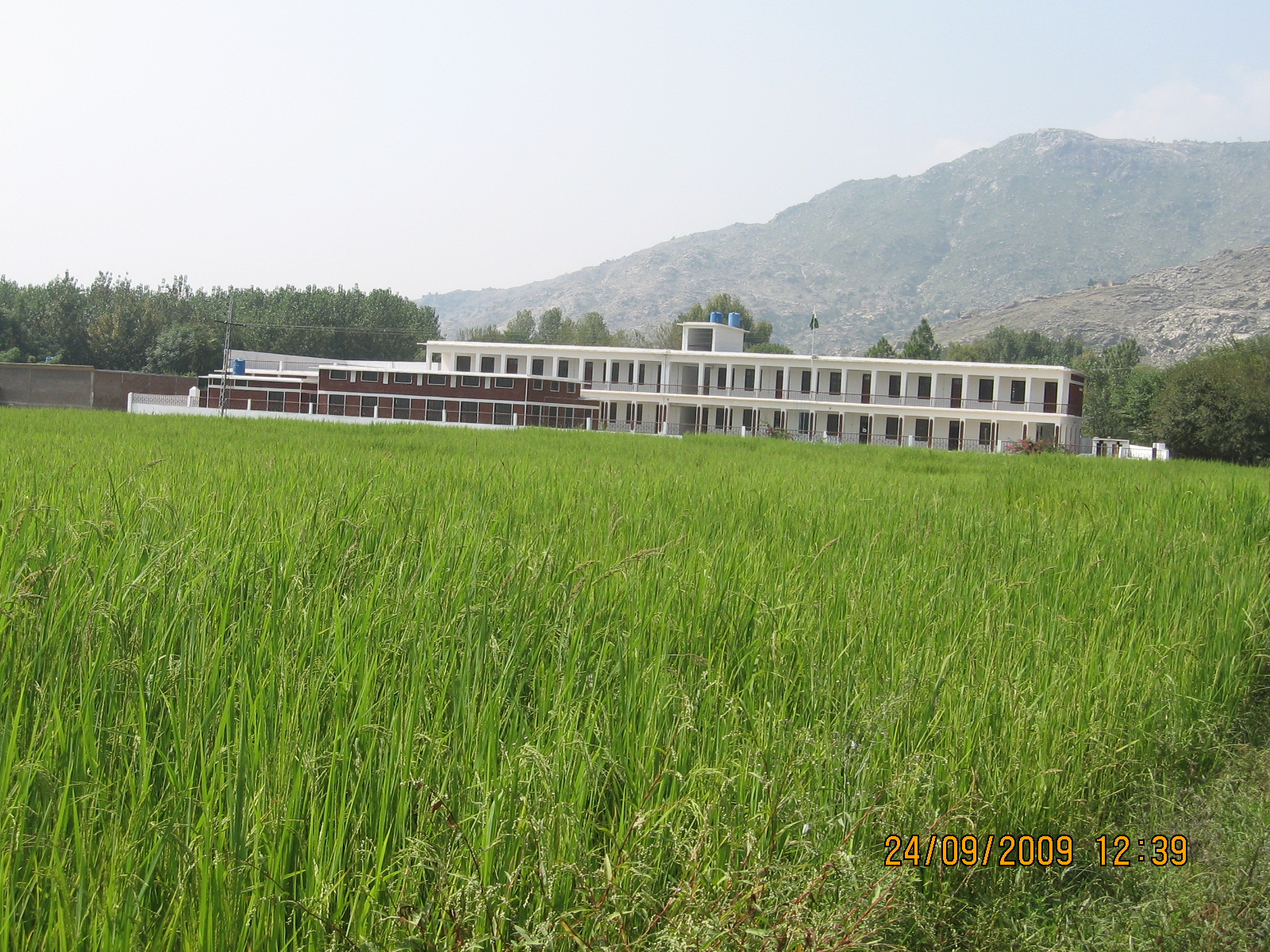
Govt. High Secondary School for Boys Badwan

== Nazims / Naib-Nazims ==
Nazim		Naib Nazim	
Tenure	Name	Tenure	Name
2001 - 2005	Gul Muhammad	2001 - 2005	Jehan Bahadar Khan
2005 - 2009	Israr	2005 - 2009	Faredon
2015 -	Gul Muhammad	2015 - Feb 8, 2018	Madad Khan
2015 -	Gul Muhammad	2018 -	to be elected

== Education ==
There is a boys' high secondary school, a girls' high school and around 45 primary schools for boys and girls. Haq Public School, Pak Cambridge School and Standard Public School are private educational institutions in the area. Some families prefer to send their children to the private schools as they may offer better education. Others prefer to send their children to Jamal English Education Academy, Chakdara Public School, and University Public School (UOM) situated in Chakdara. All of these schools provide pick and drop services to students. Most of the students study until Matriculation and stop because of the lack of access and high cost of going to nearby towns. A small number of male students go to Gulabad Degree College for Boys and the University of Malakand, Chakdara. A very small number of female students go to FEF girls' college, Chakdara.

== Military operation against Taliban ==
During the military operation in the Malakand division against the Taliban insurgents, Badwan was declared clean and there were no Taliban insurgents. The residents of Badwan showed hospitality to the internally displaced persons (IDP) and gave shelter to them. They shared their houses and food with them. Furthermore, they also helped them in finding medical assistance. A school was established for the kids of the IDPs where volunteers would teach. Those who got shelter in Badwan, appreciate the honesty and support of the locals.

== Income sources ==
Agriculture is the main source of income for most of the people. Many people are also working as government employees, mostly in the education sector. Most of the females are housewives though some are working in the education and health departments. Young people go to other cities like Rawalpindi, Karachi, Muzaffarabad, Islamabad, and Lahore to find jobs. Some people are also working abroad in different countries like Saudi Arabia, UAE, South Korea, Malaysia, and Europe.

== Sports ==
Most of the young boys play cricket and football (soccer) in the evening. The people of Badwan (especially Badwan Bala) are good players of volleyball. Tournaments are arranged by people which may be only for local teams or sometimes teams from nearby towns also participate. The main problem which the players are facing is not having a proper playground and funds.

== Flora and vegetation ==
A diverse range of trees are found in Badwan. Among these, poplar, mulberries (Morus alba L., Morus nigra L.), pines (in hilly areas), kikar and figs are commonly found.

There are also many kind of fruits such as persimmon, plum and peach which are extensively grown in the fields. Wheat, maize, rice, sugarcane and vegetables like tomato, potato, onion, radish, turnip and spinach are also grown.

== PTCL and cellphone services ==
There is a PTCL digital telephone exchange which covers most of the village. As Badwan is in Dir Lower, its area code is 0945. The phone number of the exchange is (+92)(0945) 805000. All the phone numbers are with the prefix 805 and 76, e.g. 805xxx, 76xxxx.

All the major cell phone operators which operate in Pakistan are functional in Badwan. They include Mobilink, Telenor, Ufone, Zong and Paktel.

== Badwan-Batkhela road project ==
Recently, a big project in the area has been completed. A road of a length 4.5-kilometre (2.8 mi) connecting Badwan and Batkhela. it gave faster access to the town of Batkhela and will improve the living conditions of the residents of Badwan.

The first big accident on the under-construction road occurred in the Ramadan of 2012. A resident of Chakdara along with his sister and her family including her husband and three children fell from the under-construction bridge to the Swat river. Unfortunately, no one survived in the accident and the car was also completely destroyed. This sad incident occurred because of poor management of the contractor who did not indicate that the bridge was still under-construction. The river was diverted during the construction of the bridges which resulted in huge costs for the residents of Badwan in terms of land erosion and loss of crops. The completion of the project was delayed because of floods in the river and lack of funds.

== Post office ==
There is a branch post office in Badwan. Though, administratively, Badwan is a part of the district Dir Lower, the post office is attached to the General Post Office of Batkhela. The post code of Badwan is 230 21.

== Issues ==
One of the biggest issues that the people of Badwan are facing is the lack of natural gas (Sui Gas). All the surrounding areas including Chakdara, Batkhela, Totakan has the facility but Badwan is still lacking it.

== See also ==
- Timergara
- Chakdara
- Ouch
- Shawa
- Shad Begum
- Kityari
- Ramyal
