= Education in Lower Dir District =

Education in Lower Dir District in Pakistan.

== Education demographics ==
The total gross enrollment ratio is 73.83% without including Kachi and 79.59% including Kachi class. Student teacher ratio is 43 students per teacher and there are 41 boys per male teacher and 46 girls per female teacher.

According to the recent Universal Primary Education (UPE) survey, the total number of children in the age group 5–7 years is 104,498 in which 56,937 are boys and 47,561 are girls. Due to the limited access the number of the out of school children among the age group (5–7 years) are 25,169, almost 24% children of the total (age group 5–7 years) are out of the school. In which 19% are boys and 30% are girls. These figures also include the dropped out students both boys and girls.

== Census of schools ==
There are 1,023 villages in district Dir lower. There are:

- 827 boys primary schools
- 405 girls primary schools
- 62 girls middle schools
- 90 boys middle schools
- 14 girls high schools (Badwan, Brangola, Chakdara, Hajiabad, Khadagzai, Talash, Timergara, ...)
- 52 boys high school
- 12 boys higher secondary schools (Brangola, Chakdara, Hajiabad, Talash, Timergara, ...)
- 3 girls secondary school
- 120 private schools.
- 2 Boys Colleges (Gulabad, Timergara)
- 2 Girls Colleges (Chakdara, Timergara)
- 1 University (University of Malakand at Chakdara, Established in 2001)

Beside the government primary schools, Khwendo Kor NGO is running 15 schools, Elementary Education Foundation (EEF) is running 25 schools, ILO is running 7 schools and Non Formal Basic Education (NFBE) is running 95 schools. The numbers of madrassas (religious schools) are not yet available.

== Literacy rate ==
The adult literacy of the district among the population aged 10 years and above is 93.9% which has increased significantly since 1981 when it was just 10.16 percent. The male literacy ratio is 95.76%> compared to 85.25% percent for females, according to census report 2018.

== Quality measures ==
The term quality Education needs clarity and no such practices are observed in the schools. The PTAs are formed in the schools according to government procedures, but these are only limited to school petty repairs and not involved in the school management.

== International development programmes ==
In District Dir the schools and literacy department is supported by the World Food Programme for a girls enrollment enhancement programme. They provide the edible oil to the girls enrolled in the low enrollment school. There is need of developing more partnerships among these stakeholders so that the problems of education especially in the female education are solved.

The NGO Khwendo Kor (KK) started a project on “Promotion of Girls Education in Dir” in this project KK strengthened and transformed the VECs (Village Education Committees) formed around the Community Based Girl Schools. The PRAs (Participatory Rural Appraisal) was carried out in 25 villages. Other activities running in District Dir are Women and Men Organization formation, the capacity building of the women organization and men organization was made in social activist, record keeping, PRAs, financial management etc.

KK has now initiated a project on female education in Dir. This project is the combination of some activities, like the Development of District Education Planning, reactivating, strengthening and capacity building of PTAs, EFA forum activation and strengthening, educational budget tracking and Education Facilitation Center establishment, functionalization of the middle and primary schools. KK will facilitate the PTAs to register themselves as CCB with district government and get extra funds from the district development budget. This project will strengthen the public private partnership in education sector. KK has already signed the MoU with School and Literacy Department for undertaking these activities. CRC (SPARC) Child rights committee for Lower Dir district has also focused recently on the Education ratio in Lower Dir. CRC is a voluntary organization of SPARC working for the children rights in Lower Dir by means of lobbying and advocacy. CRC has now started a campaign against child marriage. Child marriage is also one of those harmful traditional practices which has been declared a criminal offence by the Child Marriage Restraint act 1929, yet they are being held with impunity throughout KPK, where the tradition has stronger roots than law.

== Problems ==
According to the EMIS] of the School and literacy department, schools have different problems like drinking water supply, boundary walls, electricity and latrines. After devolution plan improvements are still awaited and the involvement of elected representatives in the monitoring and problem solving will take time. The role of CCBs in the education and schools is not explored and it can give better results if they are engaged in the education.
