= Munda =

Munda may refer to:

== Places ==
=== India ===
- Munda, a village in Hanumangarh district, Rajasthan, India
- Munda Majra, a former village in Haryana, India
- Munda Pind, a village in Punjab, India

=== Pakistan ===
- Munda, a village near Bilyamin in Kurram Valley, Federally Administered Tribal Areas, Pakistan
- Munda, Lower Dir, a union council in Khyber Pakhtunkhwa province, Pakistan
- Munda Tehsil, an administrative subdivision of Khyber Pakhtunkhwa province, Pakistan

=== Other places ===
- Munda, the Latin name of the Mondego River, the largest river in present-day Portugal
- Munda, Solomon Islands, a settlement on the island of New Georgia in the Western Province of Solomon Islands
- Mundabullangana, Western Australia, is commonly referred to as Munda.

== People ==
- Munda people, an ethnic group of the Indian subcontinent
- Munda peoples, list of peoples speaking Munda languages

== Language ==
- Munda languages, a group of Austroasiatic languages in Indian subcontinent
- Mundari language, a member of the Munda language family, spoken by the Munda people

== Other uses ==
- Battle of Munda, took place on March 17, 45 BC in the plains of Munda, modern southern Spain
- Battle of Munda Point, a World War II battle
- Munda Dam, previous name of Mohmand Dam
- Munda (Hinduism), a monster that was killed by Chamunda Devi in Hinduism
- Munda father of Nāgadāsaka, the last ruler (437–413 BCE) of the Haryanka dynasty of Magadha in ancient India
- Munda, an early chieftain (reigned 1006–1026) of the Hoysala Empire, in modern Karnataka, India
- Munda (alga), a Eustigmatophyte, in Eustigmatales order
- Munda (insect), a genus of crickets, in the subfamily Podoscirtinae
- USS Munda, a US Navy escort aircraft carrier
- Turanga Munda, a fictional character in the animated TV series Futurama

== See also ==
- Munda (surname)
- Mundari (disambiguation)
- Munday (disambiguation)
