= NA-6 Lower Dir-I =

Constituency of the National Assembly of Pakistan

- Constituency for the National Assembly of Pakistan
- Region: Lal Qilla Tehsil, Samarbagh Tehsil, Munda Tehsil and Balambat Tehsil (partly) of Lower Dir District
- Electorate: 457,078

Current constituency
- Created: 2018
- Party: Pakistan Tehreek-e-Insaf
- Member: Muhammad Bashir Khan
- Created from: NA-34 (Lower Dir)

NA-6 Lower Dir-I (این اے-6، لور دیر-I) is a constituency for the National Assembly of Pakistan. The area was formerly part of NA-34 (Lower Dir) constituency from 1977 to 2018. The delimitation in 2018 split Lower Dir into two separate constituencies, NA-6 (Lower Dir-I) and NA-7 (Lower Dir-II).

== Members of Parliament ==
=== 2018-present: NA-6 (Lower Dir-I) ===
Election	Member	Party
2018	Mehboob Shah	PTI
2024	Muhammad Bashir Khan	PTI

== 2018 general election ==
General elections were held on 25 July 2018.

General election 2018: NA-6 (Lower Dir-I)
Party	Candidate	Votes	%	±%
PTI	Mehboob Shah	63,440	36.93	▲6.75
MMA	Maulana Asadullah	36,665	21.34	▼26.89^{†}
ANP	Zahid Khan	30,682	17.86	▲11.86
PPP	Ahmed Hassan	27,774	16.17	▲11.97
Others	Others (four candidates)	8,259	4.81	
Turnout		171,775	48.90	▲18.75
Rejected ballots		4,955	2.89	
Majority		26,775	15.59	
Registered electors		351,245		
PTI gain from JI				

^{†}JI and JUI-F contested as part of MMA

== 2024 general election ==
General elections were held on 8 February 2024. Muhammad Bashir Khan won the election with 81,229 votes.

General election 2024: NA-6 Lower Dir-I
Party	Candidate	Votes	%	±%
PTI	Muhammad Bashir Khan (Note: Filed nomination papers as PTI candidate but ECP allowed him to run as an Independent)	81,229	49.14	▲12.21
JI	Siraj-ul-Haq	57,458	34.76	N/A
Others	Others (nine candidates)	26,622	16.10	
Turnout		169,830	37.16	▼11.74
Rejected ballots		4,521	2.66	
Majority		23,771	14.38	▼1.21
Registered electors		457,075		

== See also ==
- NA-5 Upper Dir
- NA-7 Lower Dir-II
