= Timergara Tehsil =

Timergara Tehsil تحصیل تیمرگرہ تیمرګره تحصیل
- Tehsil
- Country: Pakistan
- Province: Khyber Pakhtunkhwa
- District: Lower Dir

Government
  - Nazim: Irfan Uddin (JUI(F))

Population (2017)
  - Tehsil: 520,738
  - Urban: 40,373
  - Rural: 480,365
- Time zone: UTC+5 (PST)

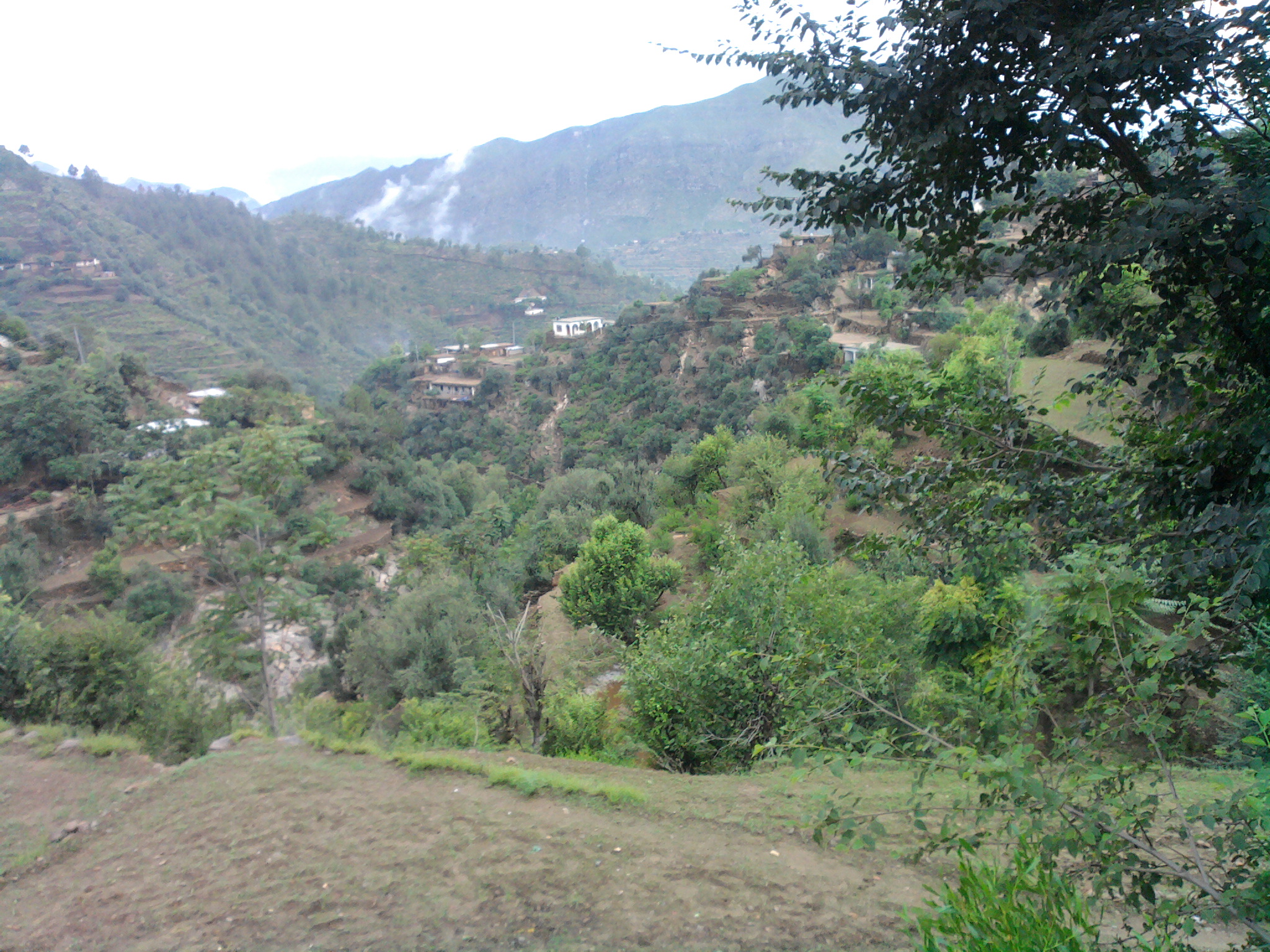

Timergara is an administrative subdivision (Tehsil) of Lower Dir District in the Khyber Pakhtunkhwa province of Pakistan. The other tehsils of the district include:

1. Adenzai Tehsil
2. Balambat Tehsil
3. Khal Tehsil
4. Lal Qilla Tehsil
5. Munda Tehsil
6. Samar Bagh Tehsil

Lower Dir District Tehsils have 37 Union Councils. The population is 797,852 according to the 1998 census report. The projected population of Dir Lower was 1,037,091 in 2005 with the same growth between the 1981 and 1998 census i.e. 3.42% per annum.

== See also ==
- Lower Dir District
