= Shawa =

Pakistani village

Coordinates: 33°15′N 70°29′E

Shawa is a village in the Lower Dir District of Khyber-Pakhtunkhwa, Pakistan. It lies 5 kilometres (3 miles) from Chakdara, near the historic Churchill Piquet on the banks of the Swat River.

== Demographics ==
Its population is about 10,000, primarily Pashtun people (Pathans) speaking the Pashto language.

Shawa village consists of different mohalas, like Darbar, Bur Palau, Manz Palau, Koz Palau, Shamlai, Koza Sha, Sero and Kaga Wala, Khwajal, Tendogag. The village consists of subtribes of Yousufzai including the Muhammad Khyl, Bao Khyl, Haji Khyl Mulayan, Katan Khyl, Umar Khail, Buda Khail, Srakamare, Radat Khail, Fazal Khail, Gali Khail, Panda Khail, Maingan, Teelyan, Qausaryan Mulayan, Tajak, Parachgan and Nayan.

== Economy ==
The main occupation is farming and animal husbandry, evolving towards the business and transport sectors.

Afternoons are recreational activities in Kwar of Shaw located at the east side of the village. The bazaar is located near darbar masjid.

== Sport ==
Residents of Shawa usually play cricket, volleyball and soccer, and a senior cricket tournament takes place during Ramadan.

== Education ==
No libraries are available. Three governmental primary schools are available.

== Etymology ==
Multiple theories describe the village name. According to one, "Shawa" is a Hindu woman's name; an alternate theory suggests that "Shawa" is the name of the trees that can be seen there.

== Climate ==
Rainfall in Shawa is low, and agriculture requires irrigation. The main water source is the small irrigation canal that comes known as Shahban Wala. The other sources are tube wells constructed by the government in a compromise that banned cocaine harvesting. The climate is mild in the summer to moderately cold in the winters. High mountains, rich in under exploited mineral resources surround the village.

The village Shawa is divided into four main categories.

- local infrastructure mostly on the bank of the Kwar river.
- the river which has high value for sand and stone for construction.
- the fields which are divided, some on the east side in the hills and some in the Kwajal and the river.
- the hills of Shawa located at the east that range from the Tazagram hill to the Barori hills to the Shamozi and Dara hills.

== See also ==
- Badwan
- Chakdara
- kityari
- Asbanr
- TendoDagh
- Ouch Adenzai
