= Jango, Pakistan =

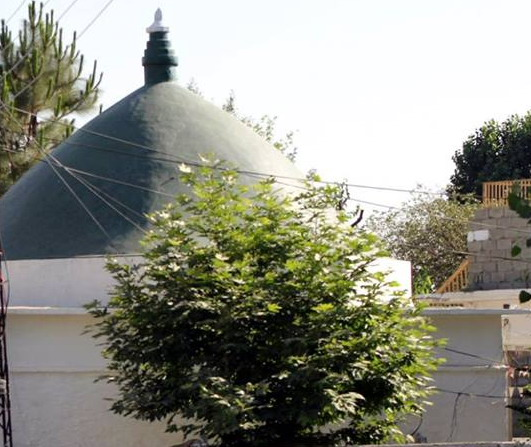
Shrine of Syed Jalal Bukhari.

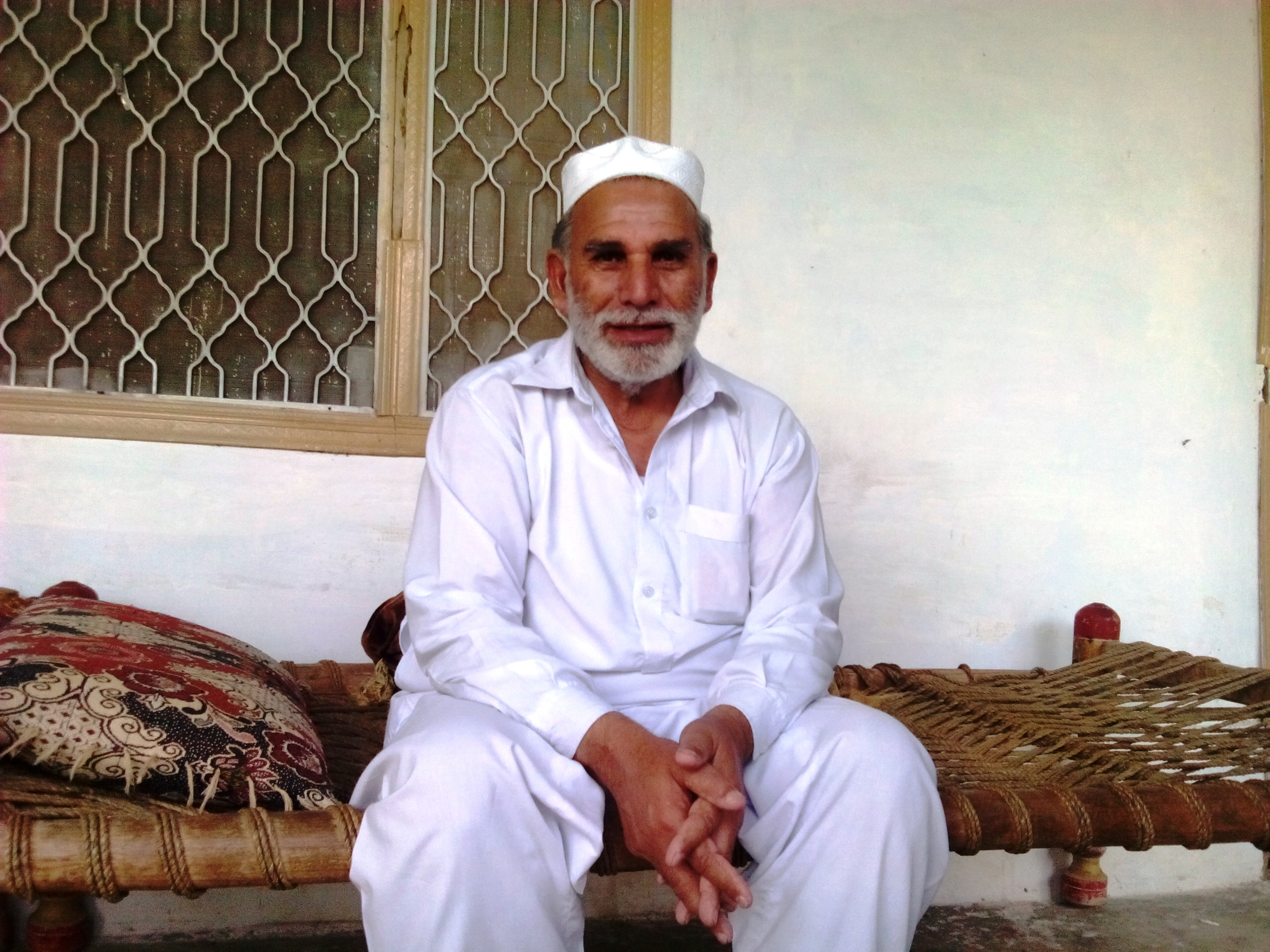
Dr. Gulzar Ahmad, the first PhD in Botanical Sciences from the University of Liverpool to come from Jango and its surrounding areas.

Jango is a village in Lower Dir District of Khyber-Pakhtunkhwa. It is located at 34°43'45N 72°2'60E and lies on the main Chakdara-Asbanr road, it has a population of about 3000. This village has been gradually merging with another village named Tazagram which is located near it. Jango village is the part of Union Council Tazagram. The literacy ratio in this village has climbed high in recent years, as it has been located in Dir District, known as a backward area in Pakistan. The population under 30 and above 10 has a literacy rate of over 80% which is a significant improvement from the 5% recorded in the 1970s. The village has produced highly qualified professionals in fields of Education, Sciences, Law and Engineering. People of Jango also give high place to religion and their country.

The village inhabitants consist of several casts, mainly (1)Mulayan or Mulan (2)Syeds or Miyagan(3)Aba khel (4)Shargha Khel (5)Musa Khel (6)But Khel (7) and a number of other casts which came to reside in the village.

The word "Jango" is derived from the word "Jang" which means war or battle, the name of "Jango" was given to this village after a war between the two sides of surrounding villages Tazagram and Shewa.

The founding people of the village are deemed to be the Mulayan or Mulan people who lived for the first time in the village, later on they were joined by the Syeds or Miyagan.

The forefather of Mulayan, namely Mulla Gut Baba and of Syeds, Syed Jalal Bukhari are buried in the village, the people of the village respect both the shrines very deeply.
