= Kityari =

Kityari is a small village located in tehsil Adenzai within the District Dir Lower of the Khyber-Pakhtunkhwa province of Pakistan. The village is surrounded by Landaishah to the west, Serai to the east, Shaban to the northeast, Khanpur to the southwest and Tazagram to the south. The main road from Chakdara to Asbanr also passes through this village. The village is 12 km away from Chakdara city, which is located near Churchill Piquet on the banks of the Swat River. The population of Kityari is about 5000 and consists of primarily Pashtun people speaking the Pashto language.

== Etymology ==
There are multiple theories about the source of the village name. According to one, "Kityari" is derived from a bird's name "Kitar Rai". An alternate theory suggests that Kityari is derived from the Urdu word "Kaitebari" due to the people's primarily occupation being farming. Kityari is located near the Swat region, which is also called the Switzerland of Pakistan. It is a calm and quiet village located in the middle of high mountains.

== Geography ==
Kityari village contains springs which are the means for agriculture irrigation. They are also a source of drinking water.

The climate is mild in the summers to moderately cold in the winters. High mountains, rich in underexploited mineral resources, surround the village.

To its north are the villages of Khanpur and Asbnr; to its east are Serai and Sabr Shah; to its west are Landai Shah, Maina Battan; to its south is Tazagram.

== Income sources ==
Agriculture is the main source of income for most of the people. Along with that, Many people are also working as government employees, mostly in the education sector. Most of the females are housewives though some are working in the education and health departments. Young people go to other big cities of the country such as Peshawar, Rawalpindi, Karachi, Muzaffarabad, Islamabad, Lahore to find jobs. Some people are also working abroad in different countries like Saudi Arabia, UAE, South Korea, Malaysia and Europe.

== Facilities ==
People have the facility of a bank which is the United Bank Limited Kityari Branch, a post office, Government Girls High School, Government Higher Secondary School for boys a kilometer away and natural play grounds.

== See also ==
- Badwan
- Chakdara
- shawa
- Asbanr
- Shaban
