= Jango =

Jango may refer to:

- Jango (novel), a 2006 book by William Nicholson
- Jango (TV series), a 1961 British TV show
- Jango (website) a free Internet radio service with no commercials
- Jango, Pakistan, a village in Pakistan
- Jango Edwards (born 1950), American clown
- Jango Fett, a character from Star Wars
- João Goulart (1918–1976), Brazilian politician nicknamed "Jango"
  - Jango (1984 film), a Brazilian documentary about Goulart
- Jango (2021 film), a Tamil science fiction film
- Jango, a character in the Powerman (Powerbolt) comic series
- Jango (One Piece)

== See also ==
- Django (disambiguation)
