= NA-34 =

NA-34 may refer to:

- NA-34 (Karak), a constituency of the National Assembly of Pakistan
- NA-34 (Lower Dir), a former constituency of the National Assembly of Pakistan
- Sodium-34 (Na-34 or ^{34}Na), an isotope of sodium
