= Malak Azmat Khan =

Pakistani politician

Member of the National Assembly of Pakistan
- In office 2008–2013
- Constituency: NA-34 (Lower Dir)

Malik Azmat Khan is a Pakistani politician who had been a member of the National Assembly of Pakistan from 2008 to 2013.

== Political career ==
He was elected to the National Assembly of Pakistan from Constituency NA-34 (Lower Dir) as a candidate of Pakistan Peoples Party (PPP) in the 2008 Pakistani general election. He received 38,068 votes and defeated Muhammad Ayub Khan, a candidate of Awami National Party (ANP). In April 2012, he was inducted into the federal cabinet of Prime Minister Yousaf Raza Gillani and was made Minister of State for Inter-Provincial Coordination. In June 2012, he was inducted into the federal cabinet of Prime Minister Raja Pervaiz Ashraf and was appointed as Minister of State for Inter Provincial Coordination where he continued to serve until March 2013.

He ran for the seat of the National Assembly from Constituency NA-34 (Lower Dir) as a candidate of PPP in the 2013 Pakistani general election but was unsuccessful. He received 6,275 votes and lost the seat to Sahibzada Muhammad Yaqoob.
