= Maskini =

- Union Council
- Country: Pakistan
- Province: Khyber Pakhtunkhwa
- District: Lower Dir
- Time zone: UTC+5 (PST)

Maskini is a union council of the Lower Dir District in the Khyber Pakhtunkhwa province of Pakistan.

Lower Dir District has 37 union councils with a population of 797,852, according to the 1998 census report. The population growth rate of the Lower Dir District was 3.42% per annum between the 1981 and 1998 censuses.

== See also ==
- Lower Dir District
