= Malak Salman Shehzada =

Pakistani politician

Malak Salman Shehzada is a politician from the Awami National Party (ANP), and an activist against violence against girls in Pakistan. He has contributed to girls' education in many underprivileged areas in the FATA. Currently, he is leading ANP Germany.

Shehzada writes articles for various publications, and is active on social media.

Shehzada was once attacked by unknown armed assailants in Timergara, Pakistan. He narrowly escaped.
