= Muhammad Bashir Khan =

Pakistani politician

Member of the National Assembly of Pakistan
- Incumbent
- Assumed office 29 February 2024
- Constituency: NA-6 Lower Dir-I
- In office 13 August 2018 – 20 January 2023
- Constituency: NA-7 (Lower Dir-II)

Personal details
- Party: PTI (1996-present)

Muhammad Bashir Khan is a Pakistani politician who has been a member of the National Assembly of Pakistan from 29 February 2024 and from August 2018 till January 2023.

== Early life ==
He was born at Gambir village, Lower Dir.

Khan is said to be uncle of Noorena Shams and Sumera Shams.

Zahida Khan is Khan’s sister in law.

== Political career ==
He has been a member of Pakistan Tehreek-e-Insaf since 1996.

He ran for the Provincial Assembly of the North-West Frontier Province as a candidate of the Pakistan Tehreek-e-Insaf (PTI) from PF-76 Dir-IV in the 1997 North-West Frontier Province provincial election but was unsuccessful. He received 464 votes and was defeated by Haji Bahadur Khan, a candidate of the Awami National Party (ANP).

He ran for the National Assembly of Pakistan as a candidate of the PTI from NA-34 Lower Dir in the 2002 Pakistani general election but was unsuccessful. He received 1,136 votes and was defeated by Qazi Hussain Ahmad, a candidate and the leader of Jamaat-e-Islami (JI).

He ran for the National Assembly as a candidate of the PTI from NA-34 Lower Dir in the 2013 Pakistani general election but was unsuccessful. He received 45,553 votes and was defeated by Sahibzada Muhammad Yaqoob, a candidate of JI.

He was elected to the National Assembly of Pakistan as a candidate of PTI from NA-7 (Lower Dir-II) in the 2018 Pakistani general election. He received 63,017 votes and defeated Siraj ul Haq, a candidate and the leader of JI. He has served as Federal Parliamentary Secretary for Privatisation.

== See More ==
- No-confidence motion against Imran Khan
