= Bagh Dush Khel =

Bagh
- Union Council
- Bagh Dushkhel
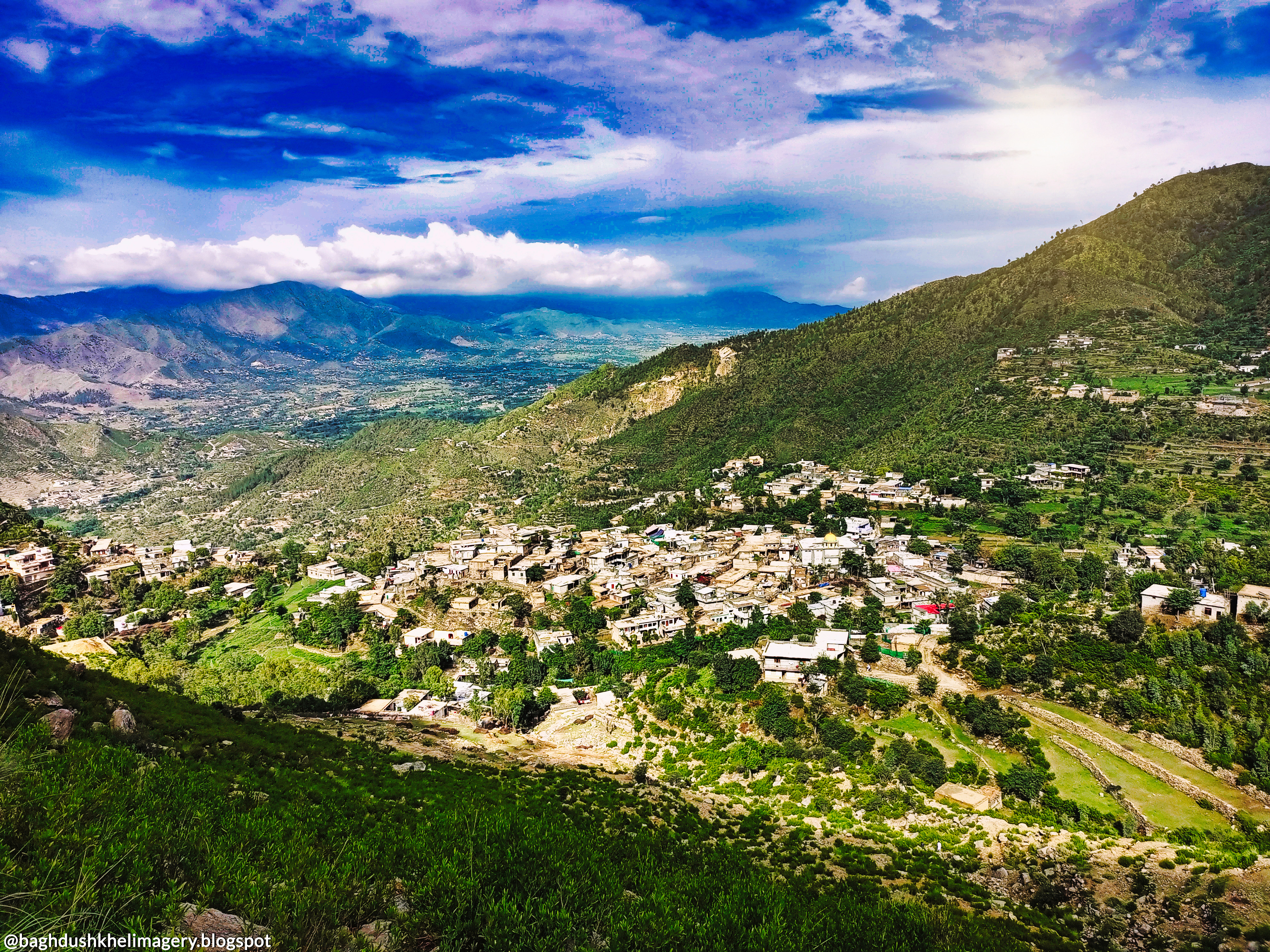
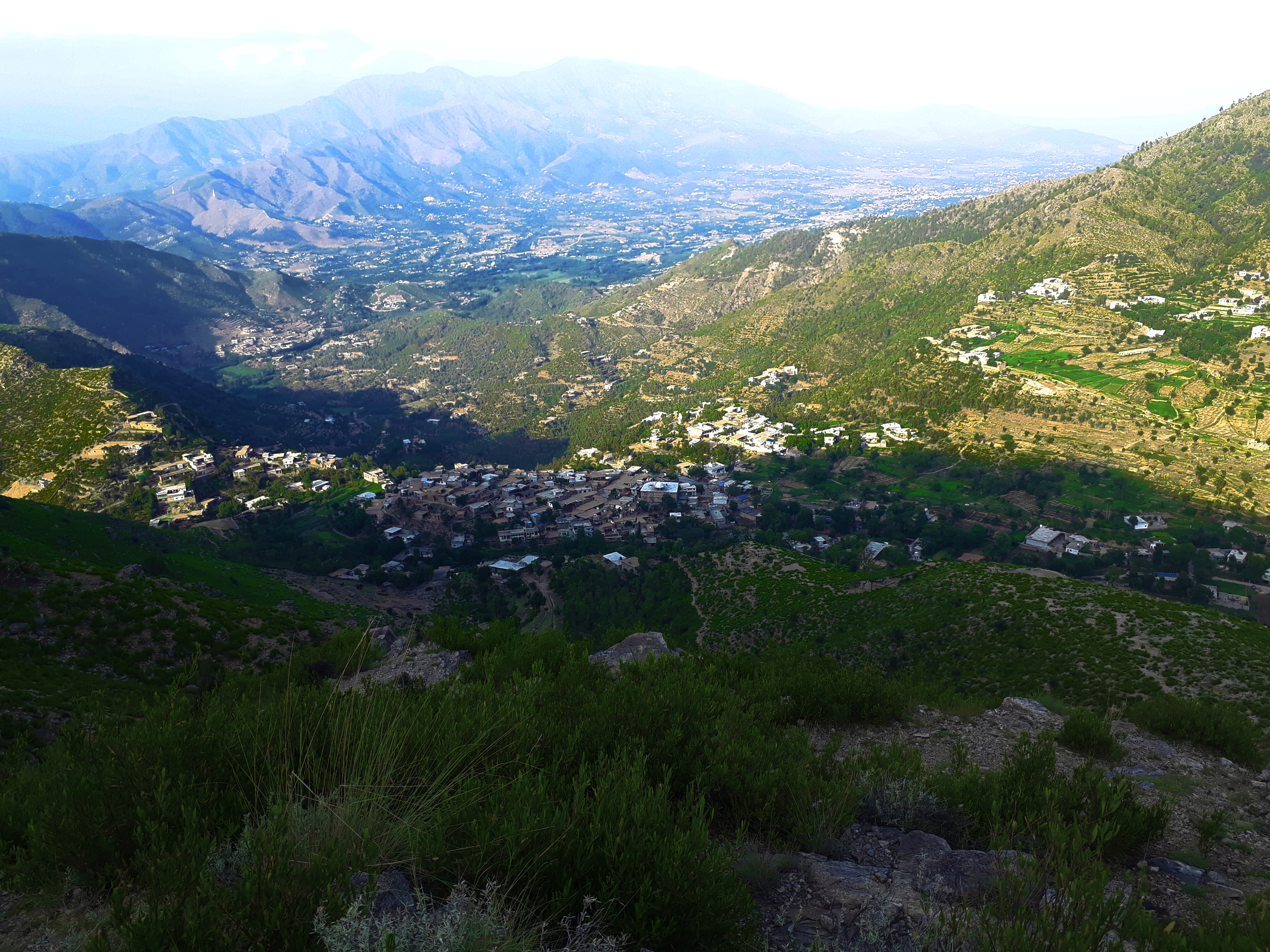

- Bagh Dush Khel (Pakistan)
- Country: Pakistan
- Province: Khyber Pakhtunkhwa
- District: Lower Dir

Area
  - Total: 2 km^{2} (0.77 sq mi)

Population (2020)
  - Estimate (9000): 9,000
- Time zone: UTC+5 (PST)

Bagh Dushkhel (Urdu&pashto: باغدوشخیل) is a union council in Lower Dir District, Khyber Pakhtunkhwa, Pakistan.

The village is located on 34°43'45.1"N 71°48'00.9"E approximately 1050 meters above the sea level. The people of Bagh, Otala, Katon, Chenaruno, and subvillages Near Bagh are known as Dushkhel. It is said that the word Dushkhel is likely to be derived from a man by the name Dost Muhammad Khan who was the ancestor of these villagers. The name changed from Dostkhel to Dushkhel over time. Although it is not confirmed.

== Neighboring Villages ==
The Neighboring villages of Bagh Dushkhel include Katon, Otala, Pingal, Chenaruno, Guroh, and Doda. Katon lies to Southeast of Bagh Dushkel, Otala and Pingal towards South, Chenaruno to its East, Goroh towards North and Doda towards Northwest.

== Neighboring Cities ==
Timergara and Ziarat Talash are the major cities near Bagh Dushkhel. Among these two, although, Timergara is large and most facilitated city but Talash is most visited by the villagers every day.

== Demographics ==
Majority of residents are ethnic Pashtuns who speak Pashto language and follow Sunni Islam.

== Education ==
Bagh Dushkhel is one of the prosperous towns in Lower Dir. Many have government jobs, and more than 70% are educated. The village has a Higher Secondary school for males which is recently upgraded from High School. Though, female education is limited to High school only (which is, also, upgraded from middle school) . For primary education there are two schools for boys and one for girls.

Islamic Education is also on rise. Both Females and males have full facility.

== Farming ==
Residents of Bagh Dushkhel earn their livings through farming. Previously, farming was the primary source of income for most residents, but population growth has resulted in residential housing replacing suitable agricultural areas. As most residents currently hold government jobs, farming is no longer considered their primary source of income.

== A second gateway ==
Bagh Dushkhel's road joins lower Dir district with Malakand district. It can be used as an alternative way to Chakdara road.

== Mountains ==
The village is surrounded by two mountains, one is Ser Mano (سرماڼو) which is to the west of the village and is 1400 meters high above the sea level. Bashe manzai (باشې منزۍ) is to the east of the village.

== See also ==
- Lower Dir District
