= Ramyal =

Village in Pakistan

Ramyal, sometimes misspelled as Rmyal, is a small village in Lower Dir District, Malakand region of Khyber-Pakhtunkhwa, Pakistan. Ramyal is located to on the west of Chakdara. The village is 3 km away from Chakdara city, which is located near Churchill Piquet on the bank of the Swat River.

== Demographics ==
The population of the village, according to 2017 census was 1,766.
