= Muntari =

Muntari is a surname. Notable people with the surname include:

- Mohammed Muntari (born 1993), Ghanaian-born Qatari footballer
- Sulley Muntari (born 1984), Ghanaian professional footballer

== See also ==
- Mundari (disambiguation)
