= Shalfalam =

- Union Council
- Country: Pakistan
- Province: Khyber Pakhtunkhwa
- District: Lower Dir
- Time zone: UTC+5 (PST)

Shalfalam is an administrative unit, known as Union Council, of Upper Dir District in the Khyber Pakhtunkhwa province of Pakistan.

Upper Dir is divided into six tehsils administratively, comprising a total of 28 union councils. Representation for Upper Dir includes one elected Member of the National Assembly (MNA) and three elected Members of the Provincial Assembly (MPAs) in the National Assembly and Provincial Assembly, respectively.

== See also ==
- Lower Dir District
