= NA-34 (Lower Dir) =

Former constituency of the National Assembly of Pakistan

- Former constituency for the National Assembly of Pakistan
- Region: Lower Dir District

Former constituency
- Created: 1977
- Abolished: 2018
- Replaced by: NA-6 (Lower Dir-I); NA-7 (Lower Dir-II)

NA-34 (Lower Dir) (Urdu: این اے-۳۴، لور دیر) was a constituency for the National Assembly of Pakistan. It was split into NA-6 (Lower Dir-I) and NA-7 (Lower Dir-II) in 2018.

== Members of Parliament ==
=== 1970—1977 NW-15 Chitral-cum-Dir ===
Election	Member	Party
1970	Jafir Ali Shah	PML(Qayyum)

=== 1977—1988: NA-25 Malakand-cum-Dir ===
Election	Member	Party
1977	Gauhar Rehman	PNA
1985	Maulana Muhammad Inayat-ur-Rehman	Independent

=== 1988—2002: NA-25 Dir ===
Election	Member	Party
1988	Sahibzada Fathullah	IJI
1990	Najmuddin Khan	PDA
1993	Sahibzada Fathullah	PIF
1997	Inayat Khan	PML(N)

=== Since 2002: NA-34 Lower Dir ===
Election	Member	Party
2002	Qazi Hussain Ahmad	MMA
2008	Malak Azmat Khan	PPPP
2013	Sahibzada Muhammad Yaqoob	JI

== Elections since 2002 ==
=== 2002 General Election ===
2002 General Election: NA-34 (Lower Dir)
Party	Candidate	Votes	%	±%
MMA	Qazi Hussain Ahmad	53,799	59.33	
ANP	Muhammad Ayub Khan	34,078	37.58	
PTI	Muhammad Bashir Khan	1,136	1.25	
PML-Q	Sardar Abul Hakeem Tajak Advocate	1,123	1.24	
Independent	Aurangzeb Khan	313	0.35	
PML-N	Muhammad Rashid Khan Advocate	224	0.25	
Majority		19,721	21.75	
Turnout		90,673	28.28	
MMA gain from Independent				

A total of 2,072 votes were rejected.

=== 2003 By-election ===
Qazi Hussain Ahmad won the general election in 2002 but he decided to take up the seat that he won in his native constituency, and thus vacated the seat. Therefore, in January 2003 bye-elections were held. The results are shown in the following table.

2003 By-election: NA-34 (Lower Dir)
Party	Candidate	Votes	%	±%
MMA	Abdul Ghafoor Ghawas	45,815	59.48	+0.15
PPP (S)	Ahmad Hassan Khan	29,581	38.40	
PPP	Aurangzeb Khan	1,632	2.12	
Majority		16,234	21.08	
MMA hold		Swing		

=== 2008 General Election ===
2008 General Election: NA-34 (Lower Dir)
Party	Candidate	Votes	%	±%
PPP	Malak Azmat Khan	38,068	48.34	
ANP	Muhammad Ayoub Khan	24,480	31.09	−6.49
MMA	Qazi Fazal Ullah	11,449	14.54	−44.79
PML	Javed Iqbal	3,366	4.27	
Independent	Shamsul Qamar Khan	761	0.97	
Independent	Dr Bahramand Khan	625	0.79	
Majority		13,588	17.25	
Turnout		78,749	24.20	−4.08
PPP gain from MMA				

A total of 2,746 votes were rejected.

=== 2013 General Election ===
2013 General Election: NA-34 (Lower Dir)
Party	Candidate	Votes	%	±%
JI	Sahibzada Muhammad Yaqoob	49,475	33.13	
PTI	Muhammad Bashir Khan	45,066	30.18	
JUI-F	Fazlullah	22,552	15.10	
ANP	Muhammad Azam Khan	8,959	6.00	−25.09
Tehreek-e-Pasmanada Awam Pakistan	Haji Muhammad Umar	7,206	4.83	
PPP	Malak Azmat Khan	6,275	4.20	−44.14
PML-N	Farid Khan Yousafzai	5,818	3.90	
Independent	Alam Khan	2,218	1.49	
TTP	Rahimullah Khan	810	0.54	
Independent	Mst Nasrat Begum	187	0.13	
Independent	Malak Rahmatullah	185	0.12	
Independent	Syed Nasar Shah	181	0.12	
Independent	Hayatullah Khan Sadat	163	0.11	
APML	Shafiur Rahman	159	0.10	
MDM	Abdul Hanan	77	0.05	
Majority		4,409	2.95	
Turnout		149,331	30.15	+5.95
JI gain from PPP				

A total of 5,364 votes were rejected.
