= Django =

Django may refer to:

== Arts and entertainment ==
=== Film and television ===
- Django (1966 film), an Italian Western by Sergio Corbucci
  - Django, Prepare a Coffin or Viva Django, a 1968 Italian Spaghetti Western directed by Ferdinando Baldi
  - W Django!, a 1971 Italian Spaghetti Western
  - Django Strikes Again, a 1987 Italian Western and only official sequel of Django
  - Django Unchained, a 2012 American revisionist Western film by Quentin Tarantino
    - Django Unchained (soundtrack), the 2012 film's soundtrack
  - Django & Django, a 2021 documentary of Corbucci's 1966 film
  - Sukiyaki Western Django, a 2008 Japanese western film directed by Takashi Miike
  - Django (TV series) a 2023 television series based on the 1966 film
- Django (2017 film), a French film

=== Music ===
- Animal Liberation Orchestra, an American rock band, originally known as Django (in 1989)
- "Django", a song by Rancid on the 2003 album Indestructible
- "Django", a 2018 single by Dadju
- Django (album), 1956, by the Modern Jazz Quartet
- "Django" (composition), a 1954 composition by jazz pianist John Lewis
- "Django!!! -Genwaku no Django-", a song by Buck-Tick on the album Razzle Dazzle
- "Django", a song by Ateez from the album The World EP.2: Outlaw (2023)

=== Characters ===
- Django (character), from the 1966 film of the same name
- Django (One Piece), in the manga One Piece
- Django, a character in the video game Boktai
- Django, a vehicle in the Japanese animated series Burst Angel
- Django, in the video game Ehrgeiz
- Django of the Dead, in the animation series El Tigre: The Adventures of Manny Rivera
- Django Brown, a character in the American animated series Phineas and Ferb
- Django, of the 2007 film Ratatouille

== People ==
=== First name ===
- Django Bates (born 1960), English musician and composer
- Django Haskins (born 1973), American singer-songwriter
- Django Lovett (born 1992), Canadian male track and field athlete
- Django Reinhardt (1910–1953), Belgian-born pioneering virtuoso jazz guitarist and composer
  - Django d'Or (jazz music award), a French music award named after him
- Django Wagner (born 1970), Dutch singer
- Django Walker (born 1981), American country singer-songwriter
- Django Wexler, American fantasy author

=== Others ===
- Djaŋu, Australian Aboriginal group of the Yolŋu people, also spelt Django
- Francisco Bustamante (nickname Django, born 1963), Filipino pocket billiards player
- King Django (born Jeffrey Baker), American ska musician

== Other uses ==
- Django (web framework), written for Python

== See also ==
- "D is for Django the Bastard", a track from The Letters EP by Northern Irish band And So I Watch You from Afar
- Django and Jimmie, a 2016 album by Willie Nelson and Merle Haggard
- Django Django, a British art rock group
- "Django Jane", a song by Janelle Monáe on the 2018 album Dirty Computer
- DWANGO (Dial-up Wide-Area Network Game Operation), an early online US gaming service
- Dyango (born 1940), Spanish musician
- Jango (disambiguation)
- Young Django, a 1979 album by jazz violinist Stéphane Grappelli, a collaborator with Django Reinhardt
