= Ouch, Lower Dir =

Coordinates: 34.730327°N 72.016926°E

Ouch (/uːtʃ/, Pashto: اوچ) By population (Ouch) is the Largest town in the Lower Dir District of the Khyber Pakhtunkhwa province of Pakistan. The town has seen extensive expansion and enjoys good communication as it is located on the main N45 Dir Road, about 10 kilometres (6.2 mi) north of Chakdara. The region is about 138 km (86 mi) away from Peshawar and 48 km (30 mi) away from Saidu Sharif and is mainly known for its shoemakers and goldsmiths. in the era of the Dir State the town served as the administrative headquarters of Adenzai. The BISP Tehsil office of Adenzai Located In Ouch East, and NADRA office located in Kharkanai Ouch West.

== Educational institutions ==
- Degree College Gulabad Ouch (for boys)
- Adenzai Degree College (for girls)Ouch East.
- Govt. Higher Secondary School Ouch for Boys.
- Govt Higher Secondary School Ouch for Girls.
- Govt. High School Ouch
- Govt. Higher Secondary School Khair Abad Ouch
- Govt. Higher Secondary School Kotigram Ouch
- Govt. High School Maina Battan Ouch
- Govt. Girls Middle School Warsak, Ouch
- Govt. Boys Middle School, Warsak, Ouch

PRIVATE SCHOOLS.

- Ranra (رڼا) Model School Ouch
- Progressive Model school.
- Alhuda Schools and College.
- Islamya Model School.
- Vision Model school.
- Adenzai Model school.
- Alnasir Public School.
- Almeezan Public school.
- Alnajam School.
- Cordoba School.
- Angel House School.
- Oxford Garamer school Batan.
- New Angel House School Syster Janza Ouch

MADRASAS

- Jamia Mazharul Islam Mosque
- Jamia Mehmodia Ouch Sharqi
- JAMIA MADINE AND MOSQUE GUL SHAHAN ABAD OUCH
- JAMIA Abubakar Sadiq Mina Ouch.
- Madrasa Jamia Esat Tul Quran West Ouch Gulshan Abad.

== Health facilities ==
- RHC Ouch
- TB Health Center Ouch

== Sporting teams ==
Young people in Ouch play games like volleyball, football, cricket, hockey, and other local games. A stadium in Ouch East named Ouch Sport Stadium and officially (Malak Muzzafar Khan Sports Stadium) serves as the main sporting place. The main sports organizations include:

=== Volleyball ===
1. Rafiq Adenzai VBC Ouch
2. Darakshan VBC Ouch
3. Adenzai VBC Ouch
4. Khamar VBC Ouch Maina (Ghufran, Azad Khan)
5. Insaf VBC Ouch.

=== Cricket ===
1. Ramzan Club Ouch
2. Friends Club Ouch
3. Young Star Ouch
4. Ouch Eleven Club the pioneer cricket club in village
5. Fighter 11 club ouch

=== Football ===
1. Ouch Eleven Football Club
2. Aangar FBC Ouch
3. Ouch FBC Ouch West
4. Shehbaz Shaheed FC Ouch West

== Archaeological sites ==
=== Aandan Dherai ===
Aandhan Dehrai is an important Buddhist site located 7 km (4.3 mi) north of Chakdara Bridge in Ouch. According to the Buddhist pilgrim Xuan Zang, there is a legend about what Buddha did at this site. According to the legend, Buddha transformed into an enormous serpent lying dead in the valley in order to save the people from famine. The starving people ate the snake and were saved. According to another tradition, Gandhāra is the location of the mystical Lake Dhanakosha, birthplace of Padmasambhava, founder of Tibetan Buddhism.

The Kagyu sect of Tibetan Buddhism identifies the lake with the Alladun Dheri stupa and believes a spring flows from the base of the stupa to form the lake. Archaeologists have found the stupa but no spring or lake can be identified. Aandhan Dehrai Stupa was excavated by Professor Ahmad Dani who recovered over 500 pieces of Gandhara sculpture.

=== Laram Top Ouch ===
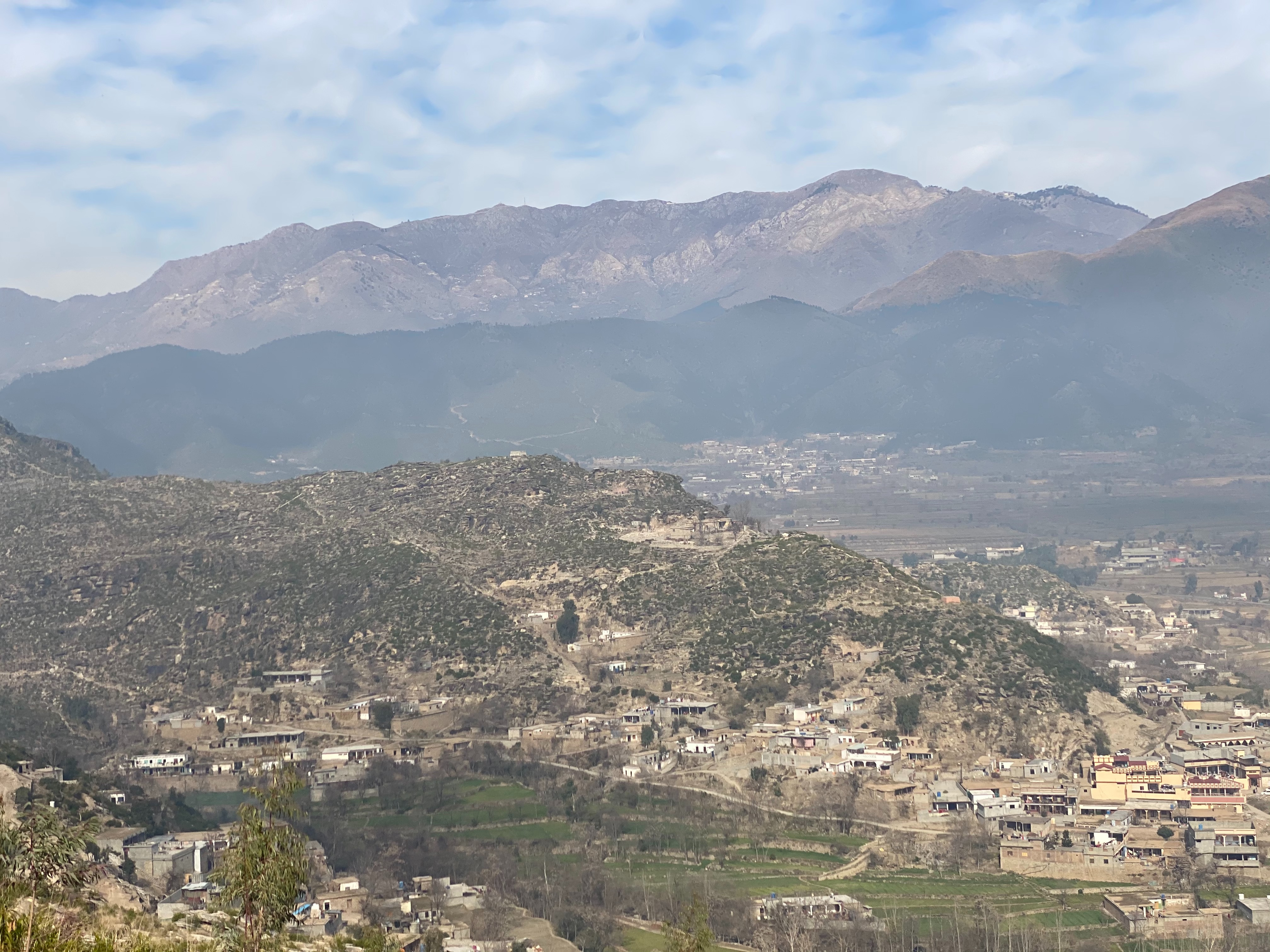
Laram mountain (in the back)

Laram, known for its lush green hills, is a destination for tourists. Laram Sar (about 6,000 to 7,000 m (20,000 to 23,000 ft) above sea level) is a tourist spot in Lower Dir. The important surrounding hamlets include Danda, Tangobagh, Segay, Babakhwar, Kasso, Gudyakhwar etc. It is situated at a distance of 21 km (13 mi) from the from Chakdara. Timergara is lying on its western side while on its eastern side is with Malam Jaba. On its southwestern side is the famous historical Talash Valley.

Laram Sar can be reached from different areas such as Rabat, Talash, Ouch and Timergara. It is also accessible by two roads, one from Ouch, about 21 km (13 mi) long and metalled for about 5 km (3.1 mi) up to the base of Laram Mountain, and then an unmetalled portion of about 17 km (11 mi) the top of Laram. The second road goes from Rabat Bazaar. From Peshawar to Laram Top via Ouch, the total distance is about 178 km (111 mi). The mountain top has a radar system and TV signal booster.

== See also ==
- Lower Dir District
- Timergara
- Chakdara
- Swat District
