= Munda (surname) =

This is a list of notable people with the surname Munda.

== Politicians of India ==
- Arjun Munda (born 1968), Jharkhand and national politician
- Atuwa Munda (born 1961), Assam politician
- Govind Chandra Munda, Odia politician
- Jaipal Singh Munda (1903–1970), politician, writer and sportsman
- Joseph Munda, West Bengali politician
- Kali Charan Munda (born 1961), Jharkhand politician
- Kariya Munda (born 1936), national politician
- Koche Munda, Jharkhand politician
- Laxman Munda (born 1963), Odia politician
- Nilkanth Singh Munda (born 1968), Jharkhand politician
- Ram Surya Munda, Jharkhand politician
- Sukra Munda, West Bengali politician
- Vikash Kumar Munda, Jharkhand politician

== Other ==
- Birsa Munda (1875–1900), Indian tribal freedom fighter and religious leader
- Emilio Munda (born 1982), Italian composer and producer
- Prakash Munda (born 1991), Indian cricketer
- Ram Dayal Munda (1939–2011), Indian scholar
- Rosa Santos Munda (1918–2010), Philippina lawyer and educator
- Shanti Munda (born c. 1943), Indian communist and revolutionary leader
- Tulasi Munda (born 1947), Indian social activist

== See also ==
- Munda people
- Munda peoples
