= Takoro =

Takoro or Takwaro (population c. 10,000) is a hilly, agricultural village located in the Munda Tehsil of Pakistan.

== Vegetables and Fruits ==
Most of the people grow their own vegetables, Onion, Garlic, green Chili, lady finger tinda etc. While the most famous fruits grown in this valley are apricot, peach, pear, grapes, Walnuts. various types of Mulberry Known locally as toot-fruit, Persian mulberry, black and alpine mulberry. like The people are very peaceful and known for their hospitality. village is known for its snowfall in December and January, which draws a number of tourists. The average temperature remain cold ≤ 25 °C. like Also, a spring known as the "mund cheena" is located in the hamlet, and is popular for its supposed effects in curing skin diseases.

The local language is Pashto.
