= Kotigram =

Kotigram Valley
- Union Council
- Kotigram
- Country: Pakistan
- Province: Khyber Pakhtunkhwa
- District: Lower Dir
- Time zone: UTC+5 (PST)

Kotigram is a union council of Lower Dir in the Khyber Pakhtunkhwa province of Pakistan.
