= Baroon =

Village in Khyber Pakhtunkhwa, Pakistan

Baroon is a village in the Lower Dir District of the Khyber Pakhtunkhwa province of Pakistan. It is about 11 kilometers (6.8 mi) from the district headquarter Timergara. The population of Baroon is approximately 11,000. There are four government schools and one private school for children. Additionally, the village has two Islamic education madrasas.

Baroon village is situated south of the Panjkora River, and the Koto hydro power project dam, a popular picnic spot, is also located in Baroon. The village features one water canal and four hill streams. Baroon is one of the historical villages in Dir's history. The famous battle of 1898 between Malak Faam Jan Shinwari and Umra Khan Jandooli for the Nawab-e-Dir throne was fought in Baroon, ending with the defeat and dethroning of Umra Khan Jandooli.

== Historical figures ==
1-Malak Faam Jan Shinwari - Commander in Chief of Nawab-e-Dir Aurang Zeb Khan (Chara Nawab) army. 2-Malak Sarfaraz Khan Shinwari - Subedar of the last Nawab-e-Dir Shah Jahan Khan, conqueror of Qilla Nakbi Khail Swat, and the only person in Shah Jahan Khan's era rewarded with the bravery award (Bahaduri Tamgha), becoming the youngest Subedar at the age of 18 in Dir history. 3-Malak Qamar Zaman Shinwari - Subedar 4-Dr. Shaukat Ali Khan Shinwari - Ex-Director General of Health, KPK.

== Cultural significance ==
The village celebrates traditional Pakhtoon festivals such as Jashn-e-Dir, which includes cultural performances and local sports. These events are documented by the Khyber Pakhtunkhwa Culture and Tourism Authority.
