= University of Dir =

Public university in Pakistan

- University of Engineering and Technology Dir
- Motto: A Better Future
- Established: 23 November 2021
- Affiliations: Higher Education Commission (Pakistan)
- Budget: 1 Billion PKR
- Officer in charge: Dr. Zahoor Jan
- Chancellor: Governor of Khyber Pakhtunkhwa
- Location: Timergara, Lower Dir District, Khyber Pakhtunkhwa, Pakistan

University of Dir (Urdu: جامعہ دیر) is a public university located in Lower Dir District, Khyber Pakhtunkhwa, Pakistan. The university was founded on 23 November 2021. It was a campus named Timergara Campus of Abdul Wali Khan University Mardan.
