= Prakash Munda =

Indian cricketer (born 1991)

Personal information
- Full name: Prakash Rameshwar Munda
- Born: 7 November 1991 (age 35); Ranchi, Bihar, India
- Batting: Right-handed
- Bowling: Legbreak googly
- Role: Batsman

Domestic team information
- Years: Team
- 2015: Jharkhand
- Source: Cricinfo, 26 May 2016

Prakash Rameshwar Munda (born 7 November 1991) is an Indian first-class cricketer who played for Jharkhand cricket team. He was a right-handed wicket-keeper batsman. He is a first tribal to play in Jharkhand cricket team.
