= Munda Tehsil =

Munda Tehsil تحصیل منڈا مونډا تحصیل
- Tehsil
- Country: Pakistan
- Province: Khyber Pakhtunkhwa
- District: Lower Dir

Government
  - Chairman: Anayat Ullah (ANP)
- Time zone: UTC+5 (PST)

Munda is an administrative subdivision (Tehsil) of Lower Dir District in the Khyber Pakhtunkhwa province of Pakistan. Munda is an administrative Tehsil under the jurisdiction of Samar Bagh, sub-division of Lower Dir District. It is listed among:

1. Adenzai Tehsil
2. Balambat Tehsil
3. Khall Tehsil
4. Lal Qilla Tehsil
5. Munda Tehsil
6. Samar Bagh Tehsil
7. Timergara Tehsil

It is located 18 kilometers southwest of the District Headquarters Timergara. Mian Killi is an administrative part of Munda village, situated opposite to the main location (Munda Bazar).

The residents of the area are known for their rich culture, values and typical Pashtun hospitality, honor and dignity.

Lower Dir District Tehsils have 37 Union Councils. The population is 797,852 according to the 1998 census report. The projected population of Dir Lower was 1,037,091 in 2005 with the same growth between the 1981 and 1998 census i.e. 3.42% per annum.

== Education ==
Educational facilities include Higher Secondary School for boys and a High School for girls.

== Health care ==
A Rural Health Center (RHC) is available for community health, and a Livestock Hospital for livestock needs.

== Economy ==
The economy depends on livestock, agriculture, remittances sent by family members working in the Middle East, and small business.

== Geography ==
Local geography includes steep slopes, plain areas, and mountainous parts.

== See also ==
- Lower Dir District
- Munda Union Council, Lower Dir
- Takoro, village
