= Mehboob Shah =

Pakistani politician

Member of the National Assembly of Pakistan
- Incumbent
- Assumed office 29 February 2024
- Constituency: NA-7 Lower Dir-II
- In office 13 August 2018 – 20 January 2023
- Constituency: NA-6 (Lower Dir-I)

Personal details
- Party: PTI (2018-present)

Mehboob Shah is a Pakistani politician who has been a member of the National Assembly of Pakistan since 29 February 2024. He previously served as a member from August 2018 till January 2023.

== Political career ==
He was elected to the National Assembly of Pakistan as a candidate of Pakistan Tehreek-e-Insaf (PTI) from Constituency NA-6 (Lower Dir-I) in the 2018 Pakistani general election. He received 63,440 votes and defeated Molana Asadullah, a candidate of Muttahida Majlis-e-Amal (MMA).

== See More ==
- List of members of the 15th National Assembly of Pakistan
- No-confidence motion against Imran Khan
