= Mundari =

Mundari may refer to:

- Mundari people, a nation native to southern Sudan
  - Mandari language, their Nilotic language
- Mundari language, a Munda (Austroasiatic) language spoken by the Munda people of India

== See also ==
- Munda (disambiguation)
- Mundare, town in Alberta, Canada
