= Khall Tehsil =

Khall Tehsil تحصیل خال خال تحصیل
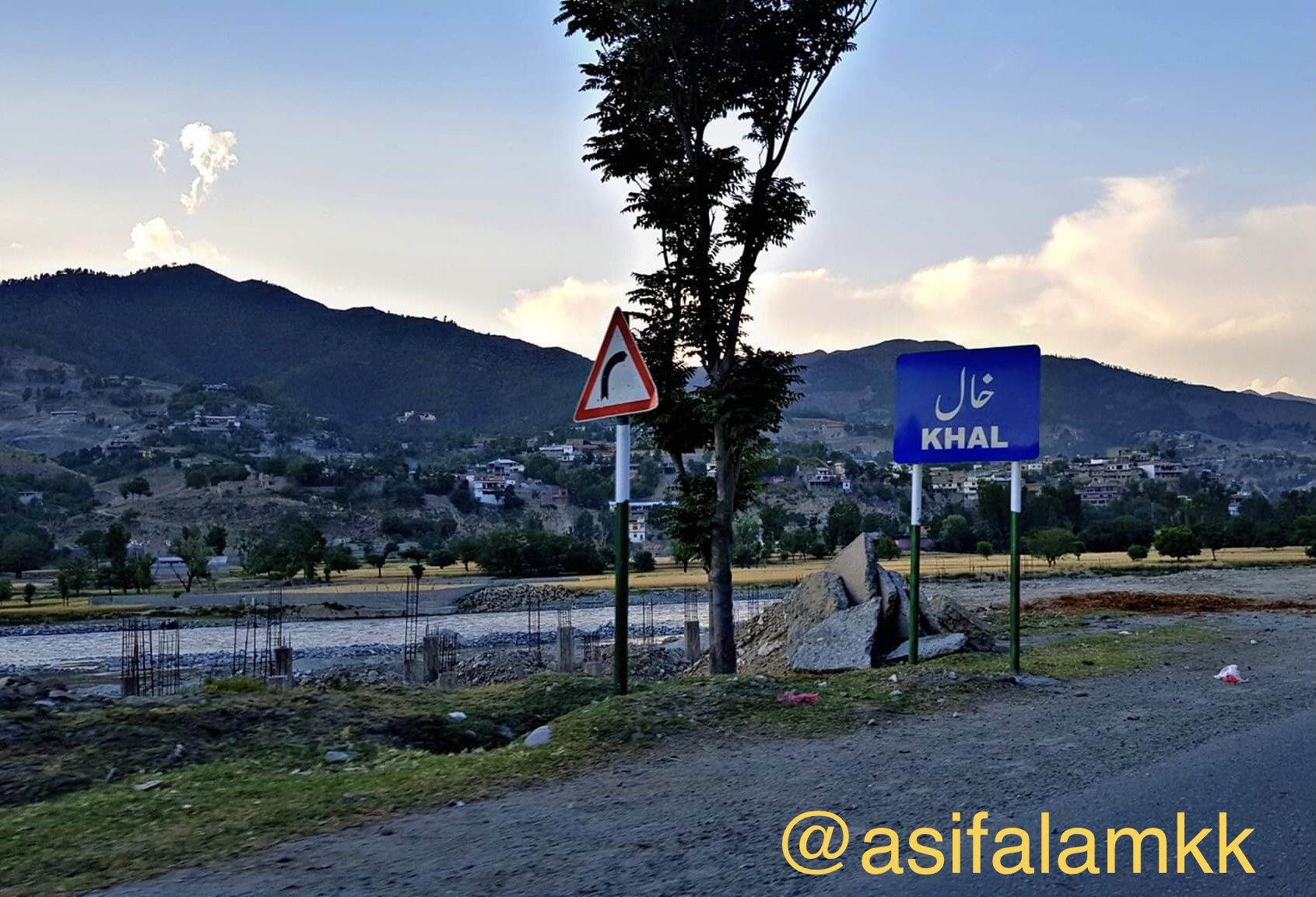
- Country: Pakistan
- Province: Khyber Pakhtunkhwa
- District: Lower Dir
- Tehsil (Town): Khal Tehsil

Government
  - Chairman: Ishfaq ur Raheem (PTI)
- Elevation: 949 m (3,114 ft)

Khall is an administrative subdivision (Tehsil) of Lower Dir District in the Khyber Pakhtunkhwa province of Pakistan. It is named after Khal (Bindi), a decorative dot worn by women on the centre of the forehead, as it is located in the centre of Dir. The other tehsils of the district include:

1. Adenzai Tehsil
2. Balambat Tehsil
3. Lal Qilla Tehsil
4. Munda Tehsil
5. Samar Bagh Tehsil
6. Timergara Tehsil

Lower Dir District Tehsils have 37 Union Councils. The population is 797,852, according to the 1998 census. The projected population of Dir Lower was 1,037,091 in 2005 with the same growth between the 1981 and 1998 census i.e. 3.42% per annum.

== See also ==
- Lower Dir District
