= Zahid Khan (politician) =

Pakistani politician

Senator Muhammad Zahid Khan محمد زاہد خان

Chairperson-Senate Committee on Water and Power
- In office March 2009 – 2012
- President: Mamnoon Hussain
- Prime Minister: Nawaz Sharif

Personal details
- Born: Muhammad Zahid Khan; 14 April 1956 (age 70) Lower Dir District, Khyber Pakhtunkhwa, Pakistan
- Party: PMLN (2024-present)
- Other political affiliations: ANP (1997-2024)
- Education: B.A.
- Occupation: Politician

Muhammad Zahid Khan (Urdu: محمد زاہد خان born on 14 April 1956) is a Pakistani politician. He was a member of the Senate of Pakistan, serving as the chairperson of the Senate Committee on Water and Power. Zahid Khan served as the central spokesperson of the Awami National Party and has held this position since 1990 till 2023.

== Early life ==
Zahid Khan was born in a small village in the Lower Dir District called Odigram. He got his early education from his native town and later, his intermediate education, from the Govt Post Graduate Degree College Timergara. He holds a bachelor's degree in Business Administration (BBA).

== Political career ==
Zahid Khan started his political career while still in school. He has been a senator twice during his political career. He was elected as a senator for the first time in 1997 from the Awami National Party. In March 2009, he once again secured a seat in the senate. He served a senator until March 2015. He was the chairperson of the Senate Committee on Water and Power and a member of the Senate Committees of Communications, Information Technology & Telecommunication and Parliamentary Affairs.

On Sunday, 10 November 2024, Zahid Khan joined PML-N with his family and numerous political associates.

== See also ==
- List of Senators of Pakistan
- List of committees of the Senate of Pakistan
