= Samar Bagh Tehsil =

Samar Bagh Tehsil تحصیل ثمرباغ ثمرباغ تحصیل
- Tehsil
- Country: Pakistan
- Province: Khyber Pakhtunkhwa
- District: Lower Dir

Government
  - Chairman: Saeed Ahmad (JI)

Population (2017)
  - Total: 378,608
- Time zone: UTC+5 (PST)

Samar Bagh is an administrative subdivision (Tehsil) of Lower Dir District in the Khyber Pakhtunkhwa province of Pakistan. The other tehsils of the district include:

1. Adenzai Tehsil
2. Balambat Tehsil
3. Khall Tehsil
4. Lal Qilla Tehsil
5. Munda Tehsil`
6. Timergara Tehsil

Lower Dir District Tehsils have 37 Union Councils. The population is 797,852, according to the 1998 census. The projected population of Dir Lower was 1,037,091 in 2005 with the same growth between the 1981 and 1998 census i.e. 3.42% per annum.

== See also ==
- Lower Dir District
