= Adenzai Tehsil =

Adenzai Tehsil تحصیل آدنزئی ادنزيي تحصیل
- Tehsil
- Country: Pakistan
- Province: Khyber Pakhtunkhwa
- District: Lower Dir

Government
  - Chairman: Feroz Shah (PTI)

Population (2017)
  - Total: 317,504
- Time zone: UTC+5 (PST)

Adenzai is a tehsil located in Lower Dir District, Khyber Pakhtunkhwa, Pakistan. The tehsil includes the town of Chakdara.

The name Adenzai is derived from the Adenzai clan of Yousafzai Pashtoon tribe. It is listed among:

1. Adenzai Tehsil
2. Balambat Tehsil
3. Khall Tehsil
4. Lal Qilla Tehsil
5. Munda Tehsil
6. Samar Bagh Tehsil
7. Timergara Tehsil

Lower Dir District Tehsils have 37 Union Councils. The population is 797,852 according to the 1998 census report. The projected population of Dir Lower was 1,037,091 in 2005 with the same growth between the 1981 and 1998 census i.e. 3.42% per annum.

== See also ==
- Lower Dir District
