= Asbanr =

Union council in Lower Dir District, Pakistan

Asbanr is a union council in Lower Dir District, Khyber Pakhtunkhwa, Pakistan.
