= Sahibzada Muhammad Yaqoob =

Pakistani politician

- صاحبزادہ محمد یعقوب

Member of the National Assembly of Pakistan
- In office 1 June 2013 – 31 May 2018
- Constituency: NA-34 (Lower Dir)

Personal details
- Born: 15 March 1952 (age 74)
- Party: JUI (F) (2025-present)
- Other political affiliations: JIP (2013-2025)

Sahibzada Muhammad Yaqoob (Urdu: صاحبزادہ محمد یعقوب; born 15 March 1952) is a Pakistani politician who had been a member of the National Assembly of Pakistan, from June 2013 to May 2018.

== Early life ==
He was born on 15 March 1952.

== Political career ==
Yaqoob was elected to the National Assembly of Pakistan as a candidate of Jamaat-e-Islami Pakistan from Constituency NA-34 (Lower Dir) in the 2013 Pakistani general election. He received 49,475 votes and defeated a candidate of Pakistan Tehreek-e-Insaf.
