= Lal Qilla Tehsil =

Lal Qilla Tehsil تحصیل لعل قلعہ لعل قلعه تحصیل
- Tehsil
- Country: Pakistan
- Province: Khyber Pakhtunkhwa
- District: Lower Dir

Government
  - Chairman: Ashraf Uddin (PTI)

Population (2017)
  - Total: 219,067
- Time zone: UTC+5 (PST)

Lal Qilla is an administrative subdivision (Tehsil) of Lower Dir District in the Khyber Pakhtunkhwa province of Pakistan. The other tehsils of the district include:

1. Adenzai Tehsil
2. Balambat Tehsil
3. Khall Tehsil
4. Munda Tehsil
5. Samar Bagh Tehsil
6. Timergara Tehsil

Lower Dir District Tehsils have 37 Union Councils. The population is 797,852, according to the 1998 census. The projected population of Lower Dir was 1,037,091 in 2005 with the growth between the 1981 and 1998 census at 3.42% per annum.

== See also ==
- Lower Dir District
