= Timergara =

Pakistani settlement

Timergara: تيمرګره; تیمرگرہ
- City
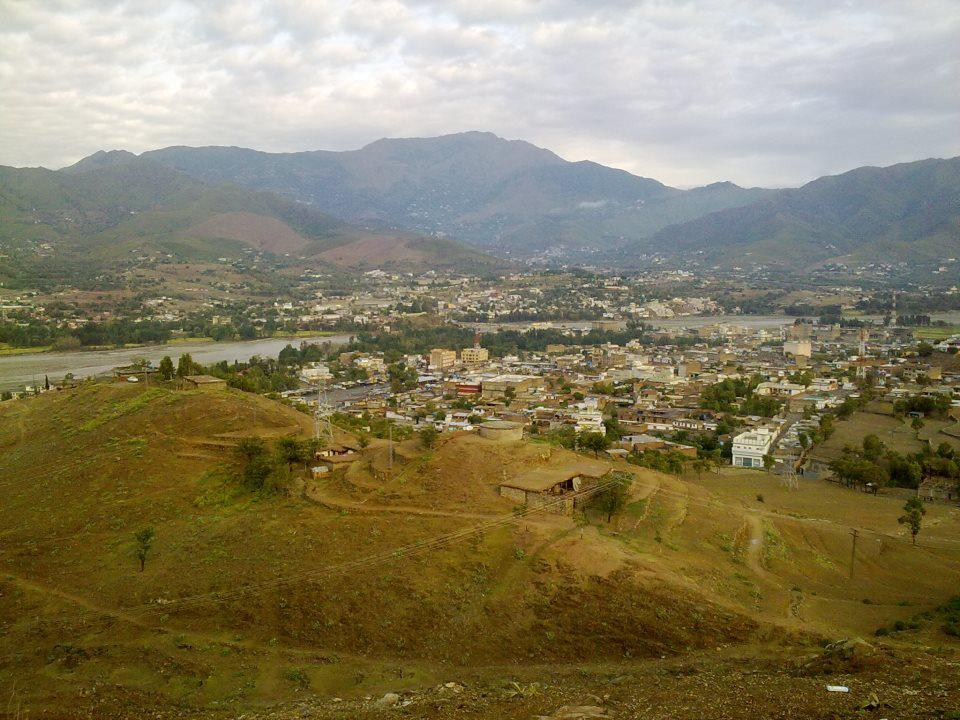

- Location of Timergara in Pakistan
- Coordinates: 34°49′40″N 71°50′30″E
- Country: Pakistan
- Province: Khyber Pakhtunkhwa
- District: Lower Dir
- Tehsil: Timergara
- Elevation: 823 m (2,700 ft)

Population (2026)
  - Total: 278,000

Timergara (Pashto: تيمرګره; Urdu: تیمرگرہ) is a city and the district headquarters of the Lower Dir District and temporary headquarter of newly established Central Dir District in Khyber Pakhtunkhwa, Pakistan. Timergara city is located on the east bank of the Panjkora River. It lies at an altitude of 823 metres (2,700 ft). The town is the site of excavated graves of Indo-Aryans, dating from 1500 to 600 BC.

At the 2023 Census, the town had a population of 47,860. Most of the main city lies on the bank of the river Panjkora, which separates Balambat from the main city.

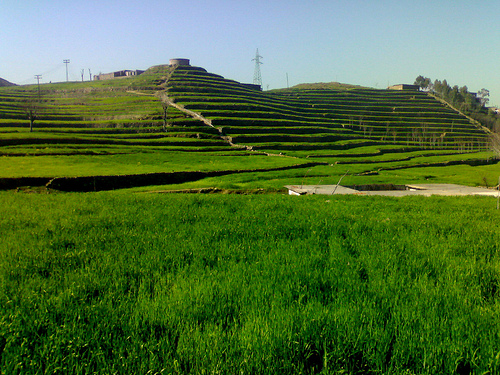
Timergara fields in winter

== Climate ==
The summer season is hot and arid while the winter is cold and wet. A steep rise in temperature occurs from May to June, and then is very hot from July to the end of August. However, the weather becomes cooler, especially at night, during September. A rapid fall in temperature occurs from October onwards. The coldest months are December and January. The mean minimum temperature recorded for the month of January is −8 °C.

Rainfall mostly occurs in the months of July, August, December, January and February. Towards the end of cold weather, there are occasional thunderstorms and hailstorms. Timergara is equally affected by global warming and climatic changes. In 2010, along with snowfall, heavy floods occurred which resulted in heavy damage to the infrastructure of the city. In March 2014, the Panjkora river's level began rising again, which was a threat to the Balambat bridge.\

== Archaeology ==
On the west side of the Panjkora River is the excavated site of Balambat. The site has been occupied continuously since the time of the Indo-Aryans in 1500 BC. Relics of the ancient Swat culture are attested here.

Discoveries included houses dating from 500 BC and fire altars, showing that the people followed early Vedic Hinduism which revolved around fire worshipping.

The area's early political history is defined by the control of the Hindu Shahis. Artifacts and ruins from the period is found throughout the region.

== Demographics ==
Historical population
Year	Pop.	±% p.a.
1951	...	—
1961	...	—
1972	...	—
1981	...	—
1998	44,335	—
2017	40,314	−0.50%
2023	47,860	+2.90%

As of the 2023 census, Timergara had a population of 47,860.

The people of Timergara are mainly Pashtun. The main tribes are Yousafzai and Utmankhel. Tor Baba (Abdur Rahim Khan), Timergara Babaje and Jaloo Baba were the prominent religious figures of this area. Abdur Rahim Khan migrated from Mandal (Bajawar Agency) in the late seventeenth century and settled in Timergara. He was known as Tor Baba for his piousness. Abdur Rahim Khan and Akhund Ilyas (d. 1676) were disciples of Shaikh Adam Binori. The Mandal (clan of Utmankheil) in Timergara or mostly called Shaikhan are the descendants of Baba Abdur Rahim Khan.

== Education ==
The total gross enrollment ratio is 73.83% excluding Kachi and 79.59% including Kachi class. Student–teacher ratio is 43 students per teacher. There are 41 boys per male teacher and 46 girls per female teacher.

According to the recent Universal Primary Education (UPE) survey, the total number of children in the age group 5–7 years is 104,498 in which 56,937 are boys and 47,561 are girls. Due to the limited access, the number of out-of-school children among the age group 5–7 years is 25,169. Almost 24% children of the total (age group 5–7 years) are out of school, in which 19% are boys and 30% are girls. These figures also include the dropout students of both genders.

=== Public universities ===
- University of Dir
- Virtual University of Pakistan Timergara Campus
- Timergara Medical College (Rani) pending from 2015
- Government College of Technology Kandaro Balambat Timergara
- Government Post Graduate college Timergara
- Government Girls Post Graduate college Timergara
- Government Girls Post Graduate college Balambat
- Abdul Wali Khan university Mardan Timergara Campus
- English Man's English Language Academy

== Economy ==
The area has a weak agriculture infrastructure with no industry. The economy is completely based on the remittances sent back to the area by people (mainly males) living in the Middle East.

== Food ==
Popular foods are fish and beef cooked as Chapli Kabab, Seekh Kabab, and tikka. A Tandoor (oven) for baking bread is present in many houses. Many inhabitants eat Lobya (Beans), Saag and Juwar Doday (bread of Maize). Lassi and Saag with Sookrak (sweet bread of Maize) are also offered to guests.

== Dress and ornaments ==
The people generally wear typical Pashtun dress. During the winter season, men wear a Chadar (a long piece of cloth, mostly used to make the body warm) around the body along with Kameez (shirt) and Shalwar. Women typically wear Shalwar Kameez and Burqa. A Chitrali woolen cap is used in winter, while a typical white Diroji cap is worn in the summer. Peshawari Chappal (leather sandals) are the most common footwear among men.

== Festivals and fairs ==
Festivals and fairs are a part of the Pashtun culture. The most important festivals are the two Eids (Eid al-Adha and Eid al-Fitr). Apart from that, most youngsters hike in the hills of Kumrat, Lowari Pass, Laram, Shahi and Oshery in pleasant weather.

== Transport ==
Timergara connects Bajawar, Dir Upper and Chitral to the rest of Khyber Pukhtunkhwa. Timergara has two busy bypass roads that connect different areas. The nearest airport is Peshawar International Airport, about ninety-eight miles away. The buses, taxis and private vehicles are the main means of transport.

== Sports ==
There is no public sports ground, but the people of khungi payeen village make for themselves a ground in the bank of river. Football players play their football and cricketers play Cricket and also players play volleyball.

There is no proper facility available for players to play a professional sports. The area has produced some prominent players in different sports i.e. Naseem Shah, Imran Khan and Israrullah (cricket), Murtaza Ahmad (hockey) and Irfan Ahmad (badminton). These players have represented Pakistan in different types of international cricket and provincial and regional teams in different games. The youngsters have a great passion for sports like cricket, football, basketball, volleyball, and hockey. Rest House Ground and FC Ground (Balambat) are the two main sporting events sites. The residents have made small grounds for sports facilities on the banks of rivers and as well as at the bottom of mountains.

== Health facilities ==
The main healthcare facility is District Headquarters Hospital Timergara. There are many more private hospitals and a number of hospitals available for ladies' treatment. MSF (Médecins Sans Frontières), an international NGO, is supporting parts of the District Headquarters Hospital e.g. Maternity, Accident, Emergency and Newborn Unit.

The pioneer practitioner of this area was the late Dr. Burhan Uddin (1942–2009). He provided primary health care to the people of this area when no hospital existed.

== See also ==
- Dara Utmankhel
- Baroon
- Chakdara
- Maidan
- Malakand Valley
