= Balambat Tehsil =

Coordinates: 34°50′N 71°50′E

Balambat Tehsil تحصیل بلامبٹ بلمبټ تحصیل
- Tehsil
- Interactive map of Balambat Tehsil
- Country: Pakistan
- Province: Khyber Pakhtunkhwa
- District: Lower Dir

Government
  - Chairman: Shakir Shoaib (IND (Note: Officially affiliated with the PTI, but filed nomination papers as an independent due to the PTI intra-party elections case))
- Time zone: UTC+5 (PST)

Balambat is an administrative subdivision (Tehsil) of Lower Dir District in the Khyber Pakhtunkhwa province of Pakistan. It is listed among: The main Balambat village has archeological value and Zoroastrian remains.

1. Adenzai Tehsil
2. Balambat Tehsil
3. Khall Tehsil
4. Lal Qilla Tehsil
5. Munda Tehsil
6. Samar Bagh Tehsil
7. Timergara Tehsil

Lower Dir District Tehsils have 37 Union Councils. The population is 797,852 according to the 1998 census report. The projected population of Dir Lower was 1,037,091 in 2005 with the same growth between the 1981 and 1998 census i.e. 3.42% per annum.

== See also ==
- Lower Dir District
