= Chakdara =

Chakdara چکدره
- City
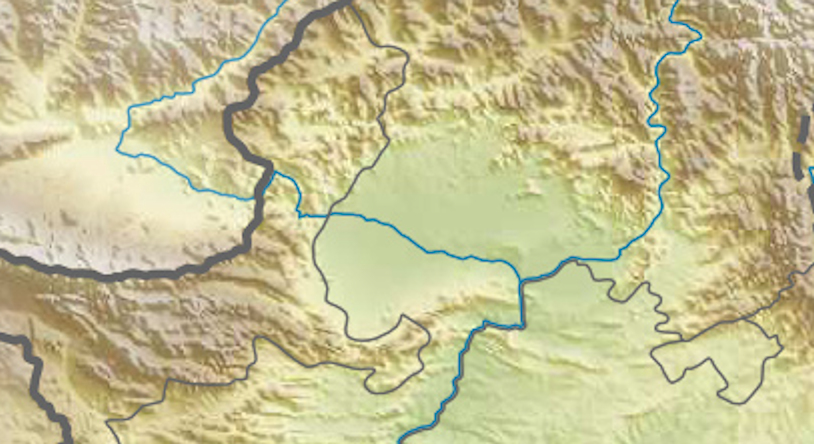
- Location within Pakistan Location within Gandhara Location within Khyber Pakhtunkhwa
- Country: Pakistan
- Province: Khyber-Pakhtunkhwa
- District: Lower Dir District

Government PTI
  - MPA: Hamayun Khan (PTI)
- Elevation: 693 m (2,274 ft)

Population
  - Total: 35,000
- Time zone: UTC+5 (PST)
- Postal code: 18800

Chakdara (چکدرہ) is a city in the Lower Dir District of Khyber Pakhtunkhwa, Pakistan. It is the second largest city in Dir Lower after Timergara. It serves as a gateway of Malakand Division. It is located in the center of Malakand Division at the entrance of the Lower Dir District, also near the entrance of the Swat District. The Swat Expressway's Chakdara interchange (Pul Chowki) touches this area. Chakdara is about 130 km far from Peshawar, 40km from Mingora and 38 km from Timergara.

== History ==
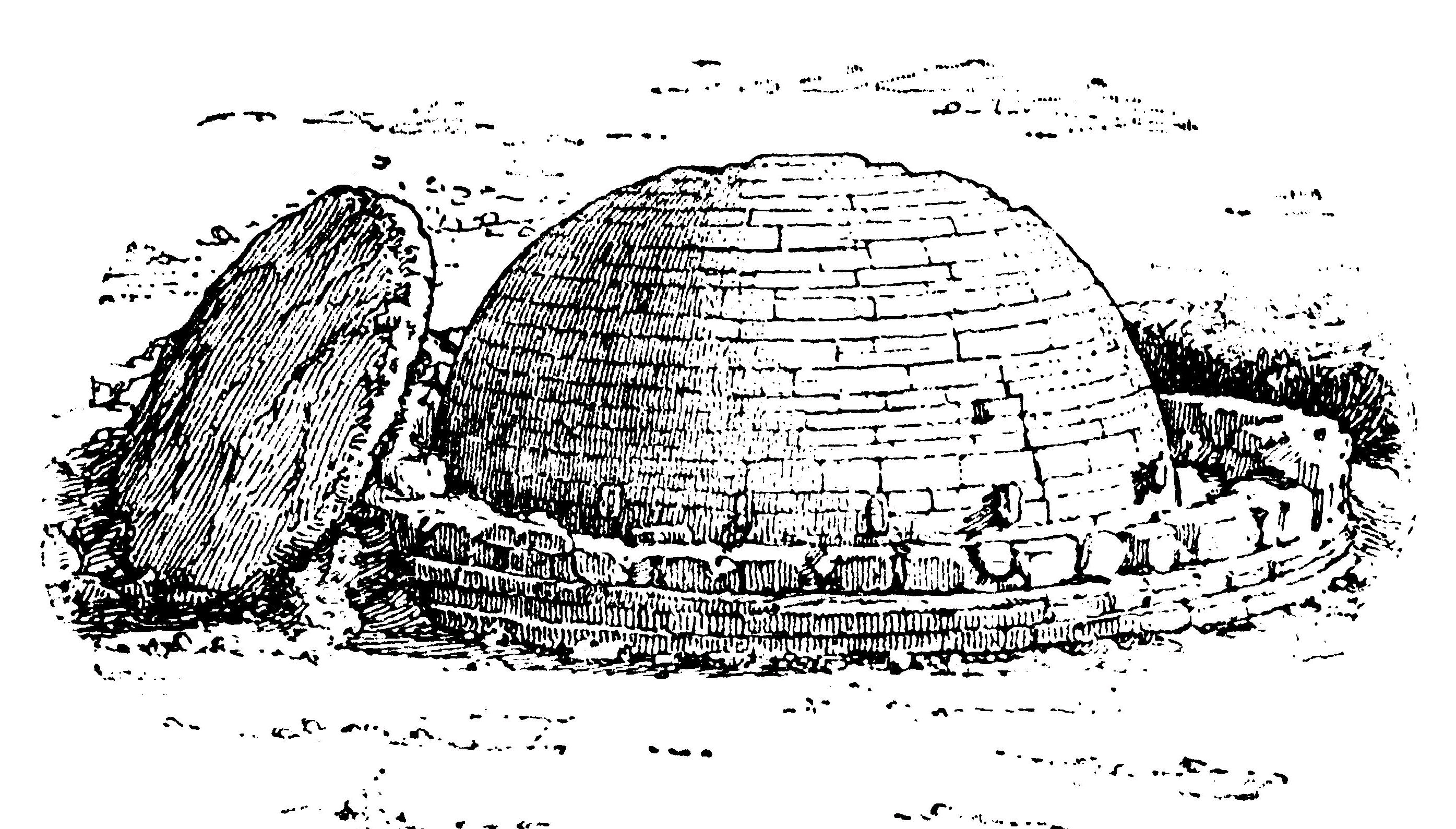
An early stupa, 6 meters in diameter, with fallen umbrella on side. Chakpat, near Chakdara. Probably Maurya Empire, third century BCE.

Chakdara has been an important center for the last 3,500 years and is littered with remains of the Gandhara grave culture, Buddhist sites, and Hindu Shahi forts. The ancient route from Afghanistan via Nawa Pass and Katkala Pass/Zwalm Pul (Bridge). The Swat River also crosses Chakdara.

The Mughals built a fort here in 1586, occupied in 1895 by the British, who built the present fort in 1896 and were forced to defend it during the Siege of Malakand in 1897.

== Archaeological sites ==
Buddhist sculpture of the first to seventh centuries from nearby sites and Hindu Shahi artefacts are now displayed at Chakdara Museum.

=== Damkot Hill ===
The most important site in Chakdara is Damkot Hill. The top of Damkot Hill has been excavated and houses with pottery and jewellery have been discovered. These items are now displayed in the Saidu Sharif Museum.

At the foot of Damkot Hill at Salami, there is an early graveyard. Early settlers buried partially cremated bodies surrounded by everyday utensils. The graves were sealed by large stone slabs.

A Buddhist stupa and monastery of the first century AD were excavated by Ahmad Hasan Dani in 1962–65. There are some Buddhist carvings at the foot of the hill. During the Hindu Shahi period a fort was built here which was destroyed in the 11th century. In the 19th century the British occupied this hill. Behind Damkot Hill at Chat pat is the site of a monastery of the late fourth century. The sculpture from this monastery is displayed in Chakdara Museum.

=== Andaan Dheri ===
The "Andandheri" or Andaan Dheri is a Buddhist archaeological site in Pakistan, about 4 miles north of Chakdara, excavated by Professor Ahmad Hasan Dani in 1966, for the purpose of establishing a chronology of Gandharan art and architecture. It has been known as the Uchh Stupa, being one mile south of Uchh village. Locally, it has been called Andanheri, meaning "round mound." Even after the site had been looted over the years, Dani's team was still able to "recover" 534 sculptures.

Andaan Dheri, an important Buddhist site, is located 7 km north of Chakdara Bridge opposite to Gul Abad Degree College for Boys near the village of Uchh. According to the Buddhist pilgrim Xuanzang this site was connected with a legend about Buddha. According to the legend, Buddha changed himself into a great serpent lying dead in the valley in order to save the people from famine. The starving people cut pieces from the body and fed themselves.

According to another tradition, Gandhara is also thought to be the location of the mystical Lake Dhanakosha, birthplace of Padmasambhava, founder of Tibetan Buddhism. The Kagyu sect of Tibetan Buddhism identifies the lake with the Andaan Dheri stupa. A spring was said to flow from the base of the stupa to form the lake. Archaeologists have found the stupa but no spring or lake can be identified.

=== Other sites ===
Three kilometres (1.9 mi) from Andannd Dherai Stupa, there is the Hindu Shahi fort of Kamal Khan Chena (spring, Urdu: چشمہ), which is now in ruins. From this fort a track leads to Nimogram Buddhist Monastery and Stupa. It has three main stupas, which identify three principles of Buddhism; Buddha the teacher, Dharma, Sangha (the Buddhist order). Near Chakdara Bridge there are ruins of the Hindu Shahi Period and stupas at Haibatgram, Top Dara and Landakai.

== Education ==
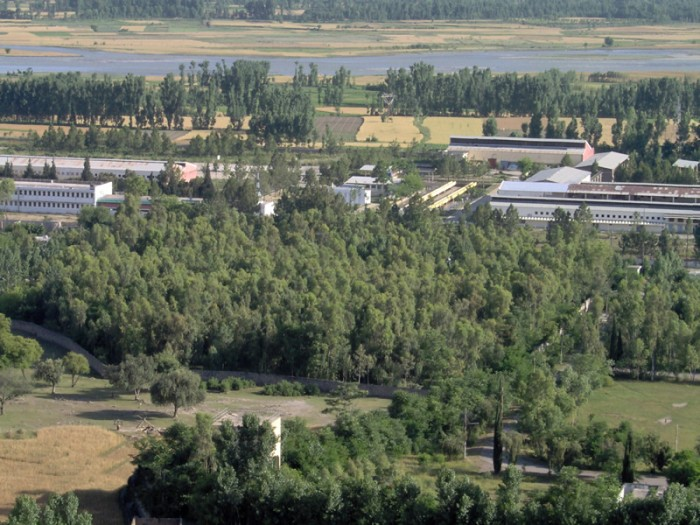
View of University of Malakand

The University of Malakand is located in Chakdara, and other important educational institutions are here, including

- Board of Intermediate and Secondary Education Malakand
- OPF Public SCHOOL (overseas Pakistani foundation) old name, Mashal school
- Degree College Gulabad (for boys)
- Higher Secondary School (for girls)
- FC Public school chakdara
- Madeena Medical Center Chakdara, near THQ hospital Chakdara.
- Govt Higher Secondary School Chakdara (for boys)
- Chakdara Fort, which is an academy for the Chitral Scouts.
- Swat public school (chakdara campus)
- Cadet college chakdara
- And Other Important Is THQ Hospital
- FEF Girls Degree College
- Polytechnic colleges for Girls and Boys (separately)
- Faran Public High school Chakdara

== See also ==
- University of Malakand
- Lower Swat Valley
- Swat River
- Badwan
- Shawa
- Ouch, Lower Dir
- Dir
