= Lower Dir District =

Lower Dir District ضلع دیر زیریں ښکته دير ولسوالۍ
- District of Khyber Pakhtunkhwa
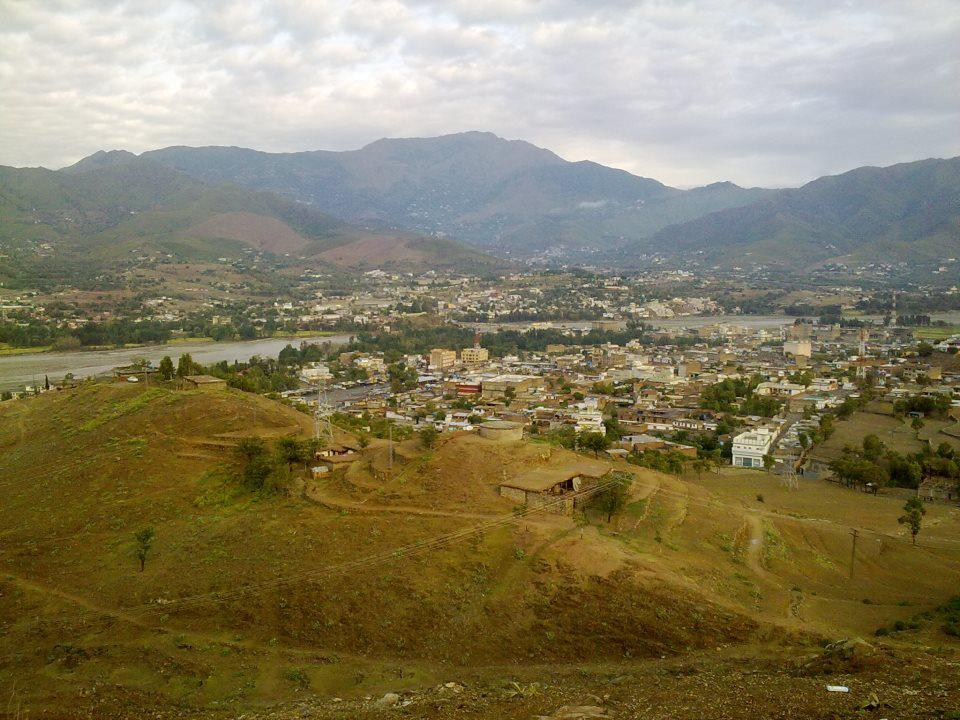
- Timergara, the district headquarters

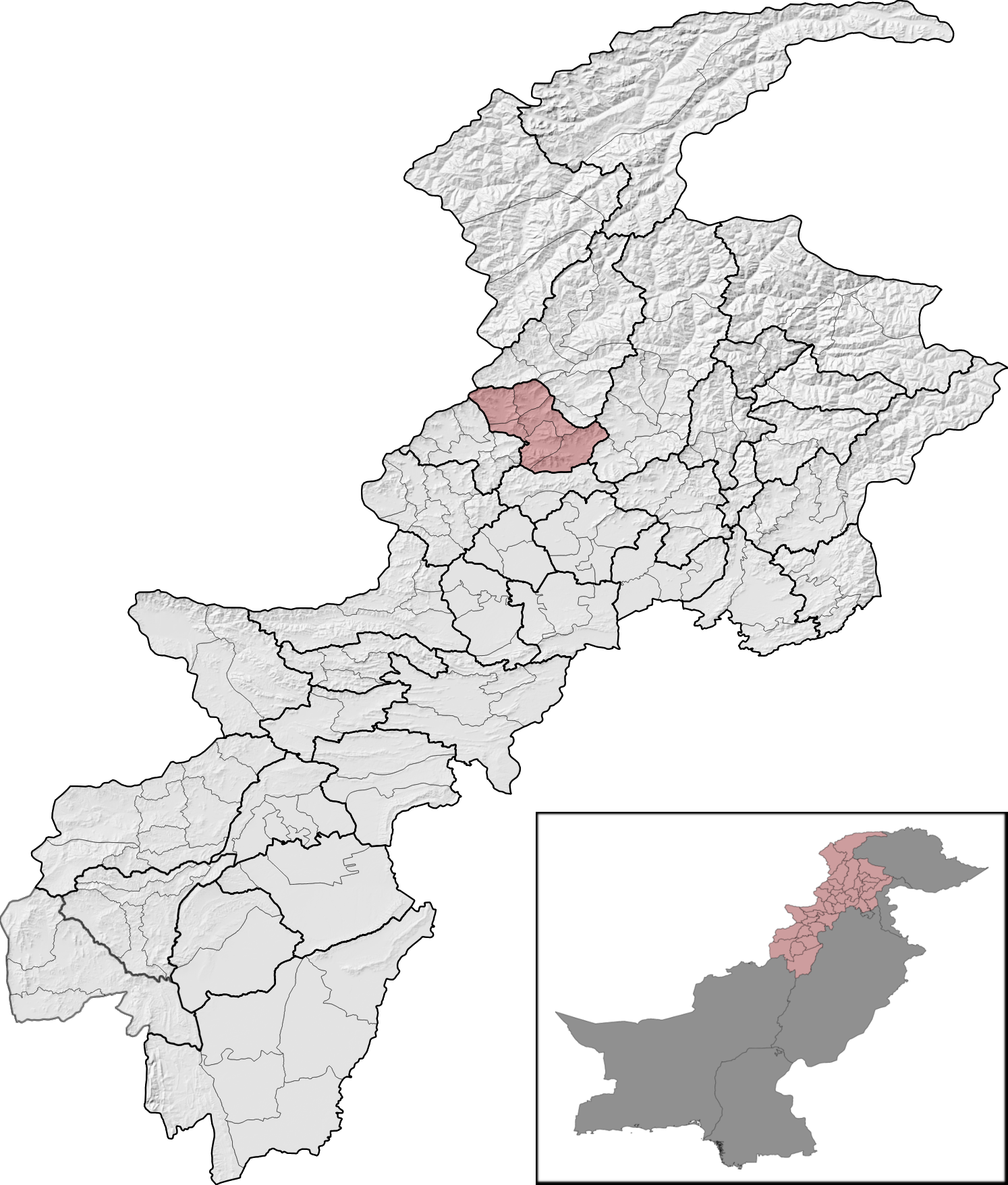
- Lower Dir District (red) in Khyber Pakhtunkhwa
- Coordinates: 34°51′N 71°51′E
- Country: Pakistan
- Province: Khyber Pakhtunkhwa
- Division: Malakand
- Headquarters: Timergara

Government
  - Type: District Administration
  - Deputy Commissioner: Muhammad Fawad (BPS-20 PCS)
  - District Police Officer: Ikramullah Khan (BPS-18 PSP)

Area
  - Total: 1,583 km^{2} (611 sq mi)

Population (2023)
  - Total: 1,650,183
  - Density: 1,042/km^{2} (2,700/sq mi)
  - Urban: 47,855 (2.90%)
  - Rural: 1,602,327

Literacy
  - Literacy rate: Total: 57.36%; Male: 72.57%; Female: 43.16%
- Time zone: PST
- Number of Tehsils: 5
- Website: dirlower.kp.gov.pk

Lower Dir District (Pashto: ښکته دير ولسوالۍ, Urdu: ضلع دیر زیریں) is a district in the Khyber Pakhtunkhwa province of Pakistan. Timergara is the district's headquarters and largest city. The Lower Dir district was formed in 1996, when Dir District was divided into Upper Dir and Lower Dir districts. On 22 January 2023, both Lower Dir and Upper Dir districts were further bifurcated to create a new Central Dir District.

Lower Dir district borders with Swat District to the east, Afghanistan to the west, Upper Dir to the north and Malakand and Bajaur District to the south.

== History ==
At the time of independence of Pakistan, Dir was a princely state ruled by Nawab Shah Jehan Khan. Dir was merged with Pakistan in 1969, declared a district in 1970, and split into Upper and Lower Dir in 1996.

== Education ==
- The University of Malakand is a public university located in Chakdara.
- The University of Dir is a newly established university located in Timergara.

== Demographics ==
Historical population
| Year | Pop. | ±% p.a. |
|---|---|---|
| 1972 | 277,481 | — |
| 1981 | 404,844 | +4.29% |
| 1998 | 717,649 | +3.42% |
| 2017 | 1,436,082 | +3.72% |
| 2023 | 1,650,183 | +2.34% |

As of the 2023 census, Lower Dir district has 202,836 households and a population of 1,650,183. The district has a sex ratio of 97.24 males to 100 females and a literacy rate of 57.36%: 72.57% for males and 43.16% for females. 542,074 (32.88% of the surveyed population) are under 10 years of age. 47,860 (2.90%) live in urban areas. 4,439 (0.27%) people in the district were from religious minorities, mainly Christians. Pashto was the predominant language, spoken by 99.54% of the population.

== Administration ==
=== National Assembly ===
NA-6 (Lower Dir-I) and NA-7 (Lower Dir-II) are constituencies of the National Assembly of Pakistan from Lower Dir district. These areas were formerly part of NA-34 (Lower Dir) constituency from 1977 to 2018. The delimitation in 2018 split Lower Dir into two separate constituencies, NA-6 (Lower Dir-I) and NA-7 (Lower Dir-II).

=== NA-34 constituency (2002-2018) ===
| Member of National Assembly | Party affiliation | Year |
|---|---|---|
| Qazi Hussain Ahmad | Muttahida Majlis-e-Amal | 2002 |
| Maulana Ahmad Ghafoor Ghawas | Muttahida Majlis-e-Amal | 2003 |
| Malak Azmat Khan | Pakistan Peoples Party | 2008 |
| Shahib Zada Muhammad Yaqub | Jamaat-e-Islami Pakistan | 2013 |

=== Since 2018: NA-6 (Lower Dir-I) and NA-7 (Lower Dir-II) ===
| Member of National Assembly | Party affiliation | Constituency | Year |
|---|---|---|---|
| Mehboob Shah | PTI | NA-6 (Lower Dir-I) | 2018 |
| Muhammad Bashir Khan | PTI | NA-7 (Lower Dir-II) | 2018 |

=== Provincial Assembly ===
| Member of Provincial Assembly | Party affiliation | Constituency | Year |
|---|---|---|---|
| Muhammad Azam Khan | Pakistan Tehreek-e-Insaf | PK-13 (Lower Dir-I) | 2018 |
| Humayun Khan | Pakistan Tehreek-e-Insaf | PK-14 (Lower Dir-II) | 2018 |
| Shafi ullah | Pakistan Tehreek-e-Insaf | PK-15 (Lower Dir-III) | 2018 |
| Bahdur Khan | Awami National Party | PK-16 (Lower Dir-IV) | 2018 |
| Liaqat Ali Khan | Pakistan Tehreek-e-Insaf | PK-17 (Lower Dir-V) | 2018 |

=== Tehsils ===
| Tehsil | Area (km²) | Pop. (2023) | Density (ppl/km²) (2023) | Literacy rate (2023) | Union Councils |
|---|---|---|---|---|---|
| Adenzai Tehsil | 372 | 378,915 | 1,018.59 | 62.19% | |
| Balambat Tehsil | ... | ... | ... | ... | |
| Khal Tehsil | ... | ... | ... | ... | |
| Lal Qilla Tehsil | 216 | 247,381 | 1,145.28 | 53.29% | |
| Munda Tehsil | ... | ... | ... | ... | |
| Samar Bagh Tehsil | 419 | 427,714 | 1,020.80 | 45.75% | |
| Timergara Tehsil | 576 | 596,173 | 1,035.02 | 64.06% | |

== Notable people ==
- Nawabzada Shahabuddin Khan, Former Ruler of Lower Dir
- Siraj ul Haq, politician
- Muhammad Bashir Khan, politician
- Jehan Alam Khan, President / Head of World Yousafzai Jirga (WYJ)
- Naseem Shah, cricketer
- Zahid Khan, Ex-Senator
- Abaseen Yousafzai, Pashto poet
- Noorena Shams, squash player

== Gallery ==
Maidan Valley, Lower Dir

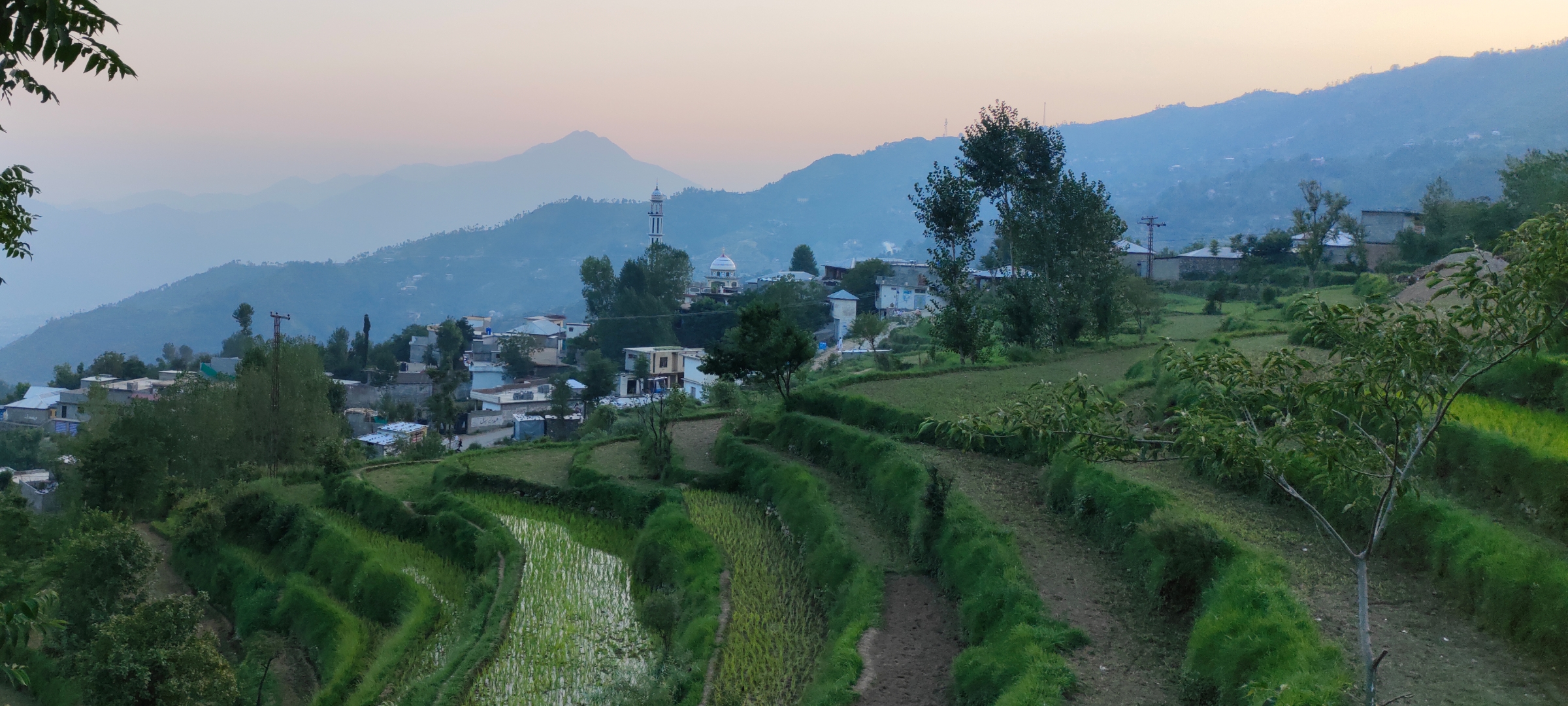
Lajbouk, Lower Dir

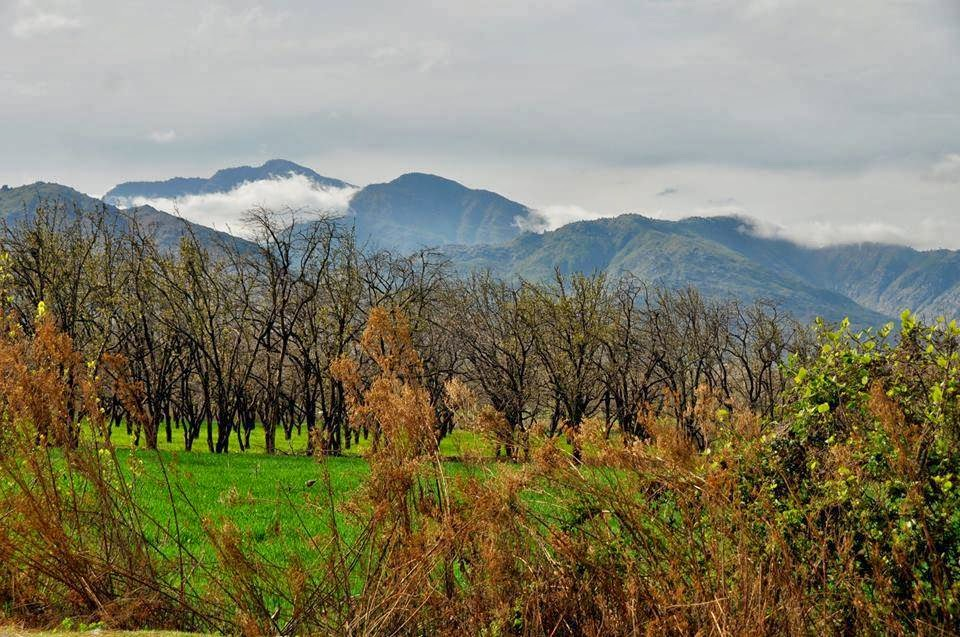
Chakdara, Lower Dir

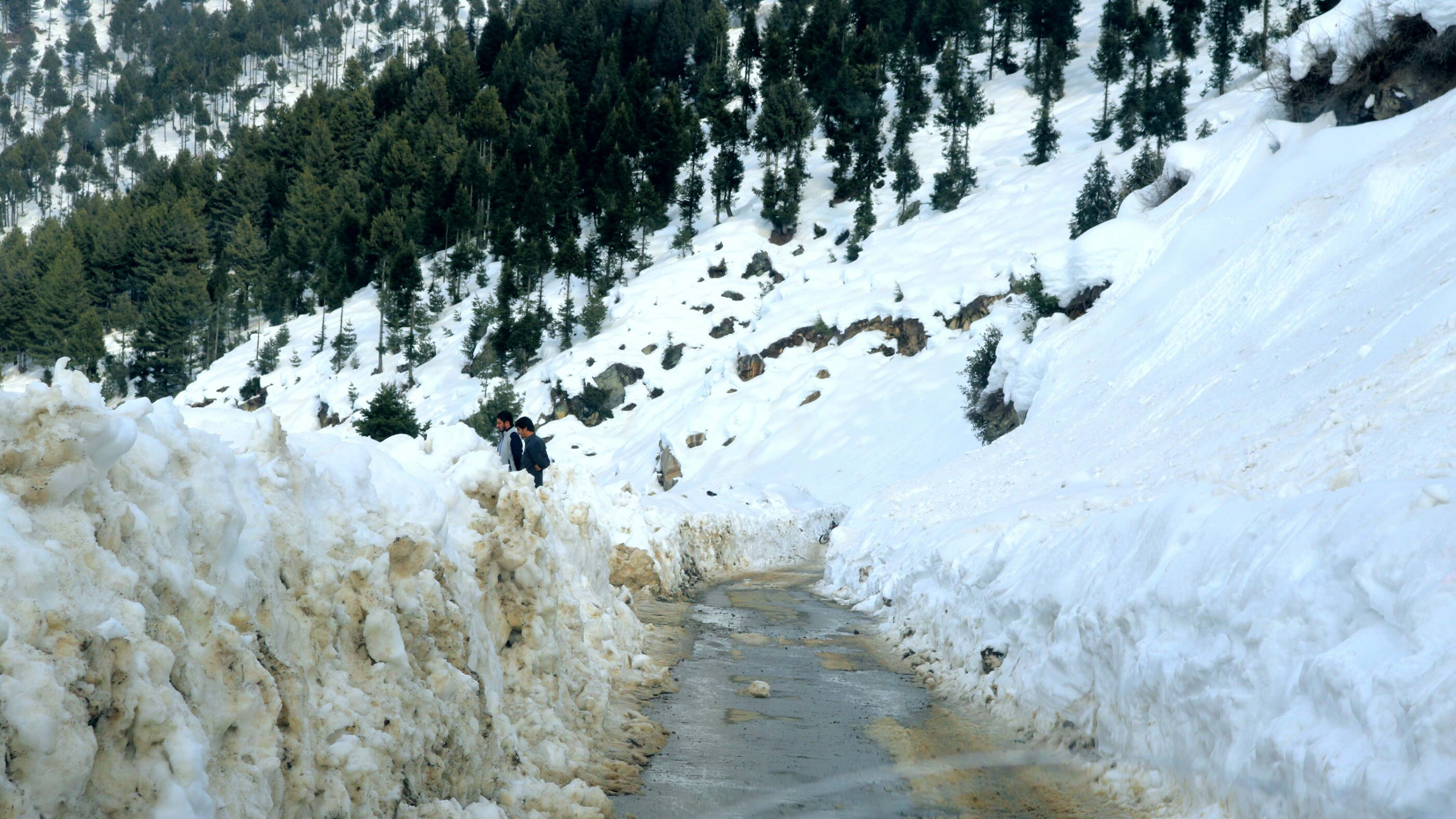
Kalpani Top, Lower Dir

== See also ==
- Constituency NA-6 (Lower Dir-I)
- Constituency NA-7 (Lower Dir-II)
- Education in Lower Dir District
- Upper Dir District
