= Malakand Division =

Administrative division of Khyber Pakhtunkhwa, Pakistan

Coordinates: 35°30′N 72°00′E

Malakand Division: ملاکنڈ ڈویژن (Urdu); ملاکنډ څانګه (Pashto)
- Division
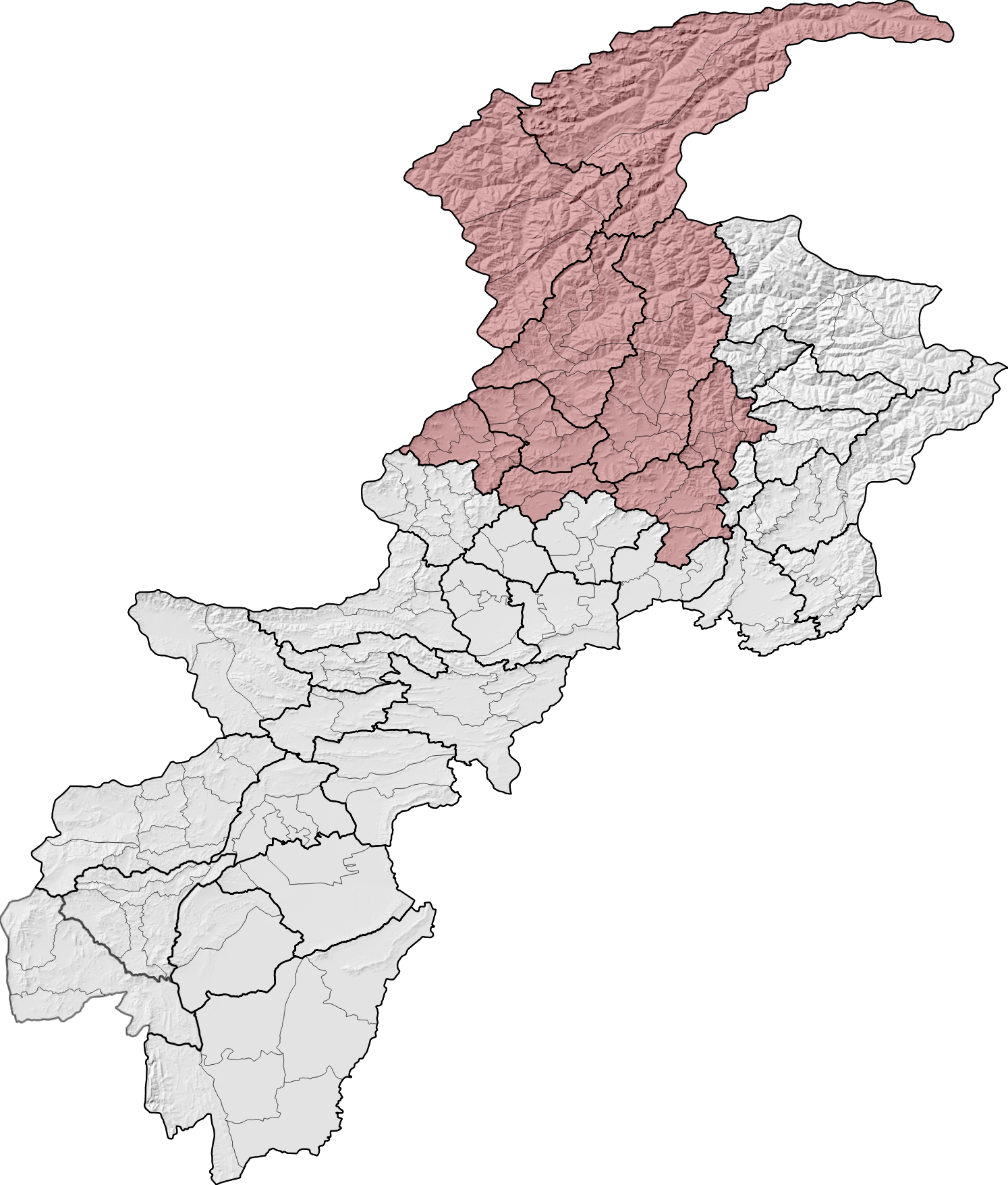
- Malakand Division (red) in Khyber Pakhtunkhwa
- Country: Pakistan
- Province: Khyber Pakhtunkhwa
- Headquarters: Mingora

Government
  - Type: Divisional Administration
  - Commissioner: Abid Khan Wazir (PAS)
  - Regional Police Officer: Sher Akbar Khan (BPS-20 PSP)

Area
  - Division: 31,162 km^{2} (12,032 sq mi)

Population (2023)
  - Division: 9,959,399
  - Density: 319.60/km^{2} (827.76/sq mi)
  - Urban: 1,020,752 (10.25%)
  - Rural: 8,938,647

Language Speakers
  - Speakers: Largest: Pashto (90.98%); Others: Kohistani (1.08%)

Literacy
  - Literacy rate: Total: (47.51 %); Male: (61.59%); Female: (33.38 %)
- Website: cmd.kp.gov.pk

Malakand Division is an administrative division of Khyber Pakhtunkhwa province of Pakistan. Malakand is the second-largest division by population while Mingora, its capital, is the third largest city in the province. The CNIC code of Malakand Division is 15.

== History ==
Until 1970, the area was known as the Malakand Agency. In 1970, Malakand Division was formed from the princely states of Chitral, Dir and Swat (incorporated into West Pakistan in 1969) and an area around the Malakand Fort known as the Malakand Protected Area. The capital of Malakand Division is Saidu Sharif, with the largest city being Mingora. In late 2018, former Chitral District was bifurcated into Upper Chitral District, from Mastuj Tehsil, and Lower Chitral District, from Chitral Tehsil.

== Demographics ==
Historical population
Year	Pop.	±% p.a.
1951	...	—
1961	...	—
1972	...	—
1981	2,466,767	—
1998	4,262,700	+3.27%
2017	7,514,694	+3.03%
2023	9,959,399	+4.81%

According to 2023 census, Malakand division had a population of 9,959,399 roughly equal to the country of Greece or the US state of Michigan or Chinese province of Hainan.

=== Ethnic groups ===
The major ethnic groups in the division are:

- Chitrali
- Gujjar
- Kohistani
- Pashtun

== List of districts ==
#	District	Headquarter	Area (km²)	Pop. (2023)	Density (ppl/km²) (2023)	Lit. rate (2023)
1	Bajaur	Khar	1,290	1,287,960	998.4	26.26%
2	Buner	Daggar	1,865	1,016,869	545.1	43.75%
3	Lower Chitral	Chitral	6,458	320,407	49.6	66.10%
4	Lower Dir	Timergara	1,583	1,650,183	1,042.4	57.36%
5	Shangla	Alpuri	1,586	891,252	562.0	33.74%
6	Malakand	Batkhela	952	826,250	868.1	N/A
7	Swat	Saidu Sharif	5,337	2,687,384	503.6	48.13%
8	Upper Chitral	Booni	8,392	195,528	23.3	73.83%
9	Upper Dir	Dir	3,699	1,083,566	292.9	46.77%
10	Central Dir District	Wari	1,483	488,543	329.4	N/A

== List of tehsils ==
#	Tehsil	Area (km²)	Pop. (2023)	Density (ppl/km²) (2023)	Lit. rate (2023)	Districts
1	Bar Chamarkand Tehsil	13	3,574	104.41		Bajaur District
2	Barang Tehsil	159	90,082	100.27		Bajaur District
3	Khar Bajaur Tehsil	238	301,778	102.81		Bajaur District
4	Mamund Tehsil	250	358,190	103.29		Bajaur District
5	Nawagai Tehsil	216	93,850	103.2		Bajaur District
6	Salarzai Tehsil	220	316,767	101.01		Bajaur District
7	Utman Khel Tehsil	194	123,719	100.66		Bajaur District
8	Chagharzai Tehsil	218	125,949	577.75		Buner District
9	Daggar Tehsil	290	192,776	664.74		Buner District
10	Gadezai Tehsil	472	197,466	418.36		Buner District
11	Gagra Tehsil	217	179,087	825.29		Buner District
12	Khudu Khel Tehsil	343	136,560	398.13		Buner District
13	Mandanr Tehsil	325	185,031	569.33		Buner District
14	Chitral Tehsil	6,127	211,374	34.5		Lower Chitral District
15	Drosh Tehsil	331	109,033	329.4		Lower Chitral District
16	Adenzai Tehsil	372	378,915	1,018.59		Lower Dir District
17	Balambat Tehsil					Lower Dir District
18	Khal Tehsil					Lower Dir District
19	Lal Qilla Tehsil	216	247,381	1,145.28		Lower Dir District
20	Munda Tehsil					Lower Dir District
21	Samar Bagh Tehsil	419	427,714	1,020.80		Lower Dir District
22	Timergara Tehsil	576	596,173	1,035.02		Lower Dir District
23	Sam Ranizai Tehsil	280	353,291	1,261.75		Malakand District
24	Swat Ranizai Tehsil	672	472,959	703.81		Malakand District
25	Thana Baizai Tehsil					Malakand District
26	Utman Khel Tehsil					Malakand District
27	Alpuri Tehsil	582	366,772	630.19		Shangla District
28	Bisham Tehsil	184	121,279	659.13		Shangla District
29	Chakesar Tehsil	335	128,238	382.8		Shangla District
30	Martung Tehsil	188	103,205	548.96		Shangla District
31	Makhuzai Tehsil					Shangla District
32	Shahpur Tehsil					Shangla District
33	Puran Tehsil	297	171,758	578.31		Shangla District
34	Babuzai Tehsil	297	696,697	2,345.78		Swat District
35	Barikot Tehsil	419	220,148	525.41		Swat District
36	Behrain Tehsil	2,899	270,623	93.35		Swat District
37	Charbagh Tehsil	161	159,358	989.8		Swat District
38	Kabal Tehsil	485	480,827	991.4		Swat District
39	Khwaza Khela Tehsil	392	307,300	783.93		Swat District
40	Matta Tehsil	684	552,431	807.65		Swat District
41	Buni Tehsil					Upper Chitral District
42	Mulkhow Tehsil					Upper Chitral District
43	Torkhow Tehsil					Upper Chitral District
44	Mastuj Tehsil	8,392	195,528	23.3		Upper Chitral District
45	Barawal Tehsil					Upper Dir District
46	Dir Tehsil	1,012	384,667	380.11		Upper Dir District
47	Kalkot Tehsil					Upper Dir District
48	Lar Jam Tehsil	1,039	119,396	114.91		Upper Dir District
49	Sharingal Tehsil	1,140	210,356	184.52		Upper Dir District
50	Wari Tehsil	508	369,147	726.67		Upper Dir District

== List of constituencies ==
Provincial Assembly Constituency	National Assembly Constituency	District
PK-1 Upper Chitral	NA-1 Upper Chitral-cum-Lower Chitral	Upper Chitral
PK-2 Lower Chitral	NA-1 Upper Chitral-cum-Lower Chitral	Lower Chitral
PK-3 Swat-I	NA-2 Swat-I	Swat
PK-4 Swat-II	NA-2 Swat-I	Swat
PK-5 Swat-III	NA-2 Swat-I	Swat
PK-6 Swat-IV	NA-3 Swat-II	Swat
PK-7 Swat-V	NA-3 Swat-II	Swat
PK-8 Swat-VI	NA-4 Swat-III	Swat
PK-9 Swat-VII	NA-4 Swat-III	Swat
PK-10 Swat-VIII	NA-4 Swat-III	Swat
PK-11 Upper Dir-I	NA-5 Upper Dir	Upper Dir
PK-12 Upper Dir-II	NA-5 Upper Dir	Upper Dir
PK-13 Upper Dir-III	NA-5 Upper Dir	Upper Dir
PK-14 Lower Dir-I	NA-6 Lower Dir-I	Lower Dir
PK-15 Lower Dir-II	NA-6 Lower Dir-I	Lower Dir
PK-16 Lower Dir-III	NA-6 Lower Dir-I	Lower Dir
PK-17 Lower Dir-IV	NA-7 Lower Dir-II	Lower Dir
PK-18 Lower Dir-V	NA-7 Lower Dir-II	Lower Dir
PK-19 Bajaur-I	NA-8 Bajaur	Bajaur
PK-20 Bajaur-II	NA-8 Bajaur	Bajaur
PK-21 Bajaur-III	NA-8 Bajaur	Bajaur
PK-22 Bajaur-IV	NA-8 Bajaur	Bajaur
PK-23 Malakand-I	NA-9 Malakand	Malakand
PK-24 Malakand-II	NA-9 Malakand	Malakand
PK-25 Buner-I	NA-10 Buner	Buner
PK-26 Buner-II	NA-10 Buner	Buner
PK-27 Buner-III	NA-10 Buner	Buner
PK-28 Shangla-I	NA-11 Shangla	Shangla
PK-29 Shangla-II	NA-11 Shangla	Shangla
PK-30 Shangla-III	NA-11 Shangla	Shangla
