= NA-40 (Bajaur-I) =

Constituency of the National Assembly of Pakistan

NA-40 (Tribal Area-I)
- Constituency for the National Assembly of Pakistan
- Region: Bajaur District
- Electorate: 255,579

Current constituency
- Member: Vacant
- Created from: NA-43 (Tribal Area-VIII)

NA-40 (Tribal Area-I) (Urdu: این اے-۴۳، قباَئلی علاقہ-۸) is a constituency for the National Assembly of Pakistan comprising Utman Khel Tehsil, Barang Tehsil, Khar Bajaur Tehsil, Bar Chamarkand Tehsil, Nawagai Tehsil, and Mandal and Shamozai sections of Salarzai Tehsil in Bajaur District.

== Members of Parliament ==
=== 2002–2018: NA-43 (Tribal Area-VIII) ===
Election	Member	Party
2002	Maulvi Muhammad Sadiq	Independent
2008	Shaukatullah Khan	Independent
2013	Bismillah Khan	Independent

=== Since 2018: NA-40 (Tribal Area-I) ===
Election	Member	Party
2018	Gul Dad Khan	PTI

== Election 2002 ==
General elections were held on 10 Oct 2002. Maulvi Muhammad Sadiq an independent candidate won by 13,097 votes.

== Election 2008 ==
The result of general election 2008 in this constituency is given below.

=== Result ===
Shaukatullah Khan succeeded in the election 2008 and became the member of National Assembly.

General Election 2008: Tribal Area-VIII
Party	Candidate	Votes	%
Independent	Shaukatullah Khan	7,428	50
Independent	Sheikh Jehanzada	3,079	21
Independent	Bashir Mohammad	3,009	21
Others	Others	1,394	8

== Election 2013 ==
General elections were held on 11 May 2013. Bismillah Khan an independent candidate won by 13,929 votes and became the member of National Assembly.

== Election 2018 ==
General elections were held on 25 July 2018.

General election 2018: NA-40 (Tribal Area-I)
Party	Candidate	Votes	%	±%
PTI	Gul Dad Khan	34,616	33.71	
Independent	Sardar Khan	17,850	17.38	
Independent	Shaukatullah Khan	16,845	16.40	
ANP	Gul Afzal Khan	14,304	13.93	
PPP	Akhunzada Chattan	12,906	12.57	
Others	Others (nine candidates)	6,168	6.01	
Turnout		104,532	40.90	
Total valid votes		102,689	98.24	
Rejected ballots		1,843	1.76	
Majority		16,766	16.33	
Registered electors		255,579		
PTI gain from Independent				

== See also ==
- NA-39 (Dera Ismail Khan-II)
- NA-41 (Tribal Area-II)
