= Muzafar Said =

Pakistani politician

Minister for Finance and Statistics
- In office 17 October 2014 – 2 May 2018
- Preceded by: Siraj-ul-Haq

Member of the Provincial Assembly of Khyber Pakhtunkhwa
- In office 31 May 2013 – 28 May 2018
- Constituency: PK-94 Lower Dir-I

Member of the Provincial Assembly of the North-West Frontier Province
- In office 27 November 2002 – 10 October 2007
- Constituency: PF-94 Lower Dir-I

Personal details
- Born: Bangai Ziarat Talash, Tehsil Timergara, District Lower Dir
- Party: PTI-P (2023-present)
- Other political affiliations: JI (2002-2020)
- Occupation: Politician

Muzafar Said (Urdu: مظفر سيد) is a Pakistani politician hailing from Bangai Ziarat Talash, Tehsil Timergara, District Lower Dir who served as minister of Minister for Finance and Statistics in the Khyber Pakhtunkhwa Assembly. He also served as a member of Public Accounts Committee.

== Political career ==
He was elected to the Provincial Assembly of the North-West Frontier Province as a candidate of Muttahida Majlis-e-Amal (MMA) from PF-94 Lower Dir-I in the 2002 North-West Frontier Province provincial election. He received 13,681 votes and defeated Ahmad Hassan, a candidate of the Pakistan Peoples Party (Sherpao) (PPP-S).

He was re-elected to the Provincial Assembly of Khyber Pakhtunkhwa as a candidate of Jamaat-e-Islami (JI) from PK-94 Lower Dir-I in the 2013 Khyber Pakhtunkhwa provincial election. He received 14,456 votes and defeated Mehmood Zeb Khan, a candidate of the Pakistan People's Party (PPP).

In October 2014, he was inducted into the cabinet of a Chief Minister Pervez Khattak as the Provincial Minister for Finance, after the resignation of Siraj-ul-Haq, the emir of JI, from the position.

He ran for a seat of the Provincial Assembly of Khyber Pakhtunkhwa as a candidate of MMA from PK-15 Lower Dir-III in the 2018 Khyber Pakhtunkhwa provincial election, but was unsuccessful. He received 16,743 votes and was defeated by Shafi Ullah, a candidate of the Pakistan Tehreek-e-Insaf (PTI).

After his defeat in the 2018 elections, he wanted JI to take action against those party workers that didn't support him, but the local party chapter was reluctant to do so. Eventually, on 16 November 2020, he left JI and joined the PPP.

Due to the likely chance of not getting the PPP nomination for PK-15 Lower Dir-III, there are reports that Said might soon join the Pakistan Tehreek-e-Insaf Parliamentarians (PTI-P).
