= Constituency WR-16 =

Reserved seat in a Pakistani provincial assembly

- Constituency for the Khyber Pakhtunkhwa Assembly

Current constituency
- Member: Sobia Shahid

Constituency WR-16 is a reserved seat for women in the Khyber Pakhtunkhwa Assembly.

== 2013 ==
- Sobia Shahid

== See also ==
- Constituency PK-94 (Lower Dir-I)
- Constituency PK-95 (Lower Dir-II)
- Constituency PK-96 (Lower Dir-III)
- Constituency PK-97 (Lower Dir-IV)
