= Kitkot =

Village in Mamund Tehsil, Bajaur District, Khyber Pakhtunkhwa, Pakistan

- Village
- Location in Khyber Pakhtunkhwa, Pakistan
- Coordinates: 34°50′N 71°20′E
- Country: Pakistan
- Province: Khyber Pakhtunkhwa
- District: Bajaur
- Tehsil: Mamund

Population (2017)
  - Total: 7,398
- Time zone: UTC+5 (PST)
  - Summer (DST): UTC+6 (PDT)

Kitkot or Katkot is a village located in Mamund Tehsil, Bajaur District, Khyber Pakhtunkhwa, Pakistan. The population is 7,398 according to the 2017 census.
