= Bar Kamar =

- Country: Pakistan
- Region: Federally Administered Tribal Areas
- District: Bajaur Agency
- Tehsil: Mamund Tehsil

Population (2017)
  - Total: 1,787
- Time zone: UTC+5 (PST)
  - Summer (DST): UTC+6 (PDT)

Bar Kamar is an area of Mamund Tehsil, Bajaur Agency, Federally Administered Tribal Areas, Pakistan. The population is 1,787 according to the 2017 census.

== History ==
In May 2015, 6 people, including Muhammad Jan, an elder of the Mamund tribe, were killed in a remote-controlled blast. Jan's vehicle passed an improvised explosive device on the roadside.
