= Begal, Khyber Pakhtunkhwa =

Begal
- Country: Pakistan
- Province: Khyber Pakhtunkhwa
- Division: Malakand Division
- District: Bajaur District
- Tehsil: Salarzai Tehsil

Population (2017)
  - Total: 1,314
- Time zone: UTC+5:00 (PKT)

Begal (or Bigal) is an area within the Salarzai Tehsil of the Bajaur District in Khyber Pakhtunkhwa, Pakistan. The population was 1,314 in the 2017 national census.
