= Bar Chamarkand Tehsil =

Pakistani administrative subdivision

Coordinates: 34.7287300°N 71.2026085°E

Bar Chamarkand Tehsil تحصیل بار چمرکنڈ بار چمرکنډ تحصیل
- Tehsil
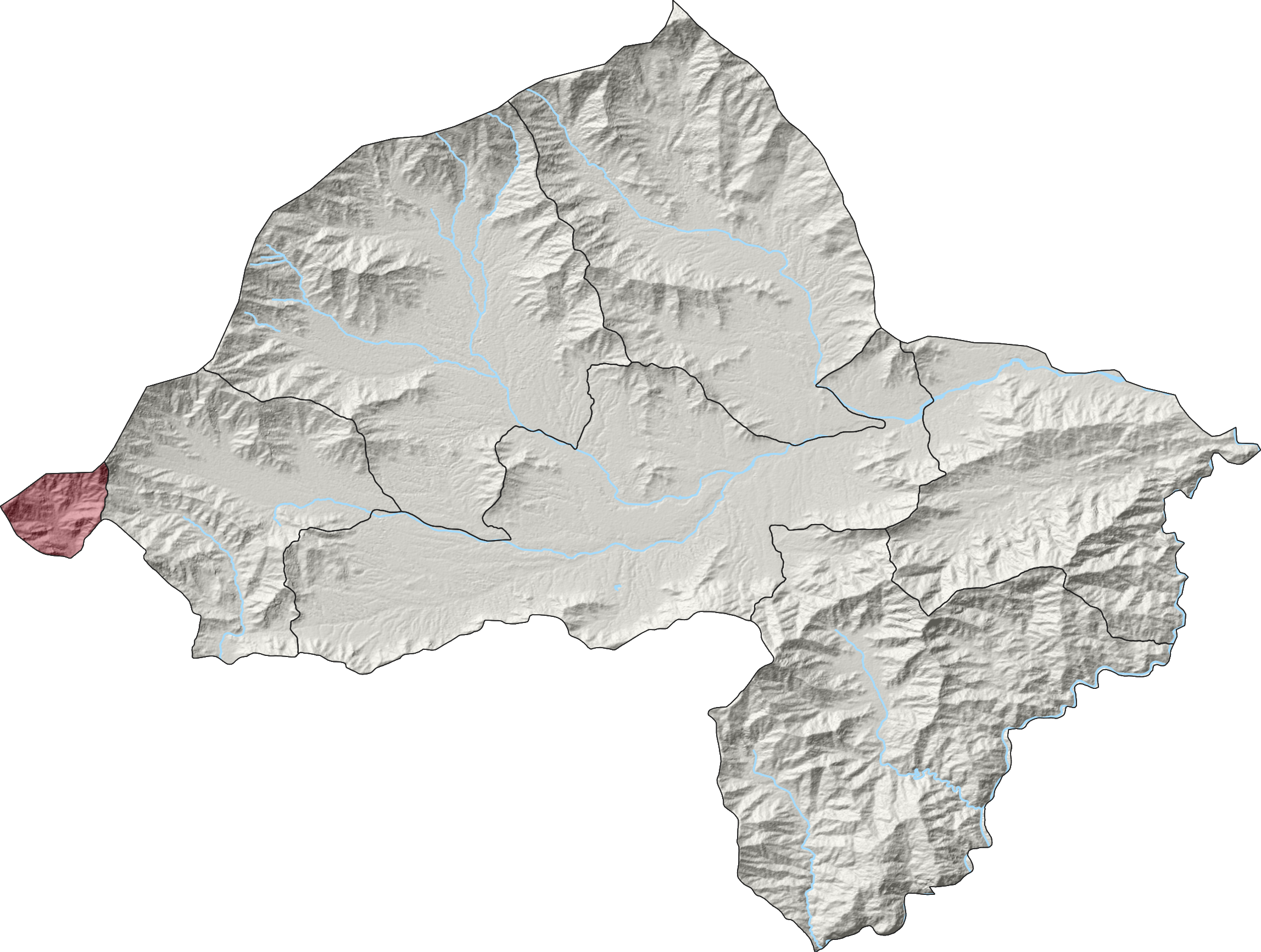
- Bar Chamarkand Tehsil (red) in Bajaur District
- Interactive map of Bar Chamarkand Tehsil
- Country: Pakistan
- Region: Khyber Pakhtunkhwa
- District: Bajaur District

Population (2017)
  - Total: 2,868
- Time zone: UTC+5 (PST)

Bar Chamarkand Tehsil (Pashto: بار چمرکنډ تحصیل), alternatively written Bar Chamar Kand is an administrative subdivision (tehsil) of Bajaur District in Khyber Pakhtunkhwa Province, Pakistan. Bar Chamarkand is the smallest of Bajaur District's seven tehsils.

== History ==
Bar Chamarkand Subdivision was part of the former Federally Administered Tribal Areas until the region was merged with Khyber Pakhtunkhwa on May 31, 2018. It was previously a tehsil before the FATA Interim Governance Regulation, 2018 was signed by President Mamnoon Hussain. It got upgraded to a subdivision when FATA was merged into Khyber Pakhtunkhwa.

== Geography ==
Bar Chamarkand, the smallest of seven tehsils in Bajaur District, is only 13 km^{2} in area and encompasses the upper half of a single, relatively small mountain valley. Representing Bajaur District's western tip, Bar Chamarkand shares a 3.00 km border with Bajaur's Nawagai Tehsil to the immediate east, a 5.73 km border with Afghanistan's Sirkanay District, Kunar Province to the north and northwest, and a 7.49 km border with Mohmand District's Safi Tehsil to the south and southwest.

== Demographics ==
Historical population
Year	Pop.	±% p.a.
1981	34,376	—
1998	3,247	−12.96%
2017	2,868	−0.65%

=== Population ===
As of the 2017 Pakistani national census, Bar Chamarkand Tehsil has a population of 2,868 people and 336 households, representing a -0.65% decline from its 1998 census population of 3,247. Bar Chamarkand was the only tehsil in Bajaur to have experienced a population decline between 1998 and 2017, with other tehsil population growth rates between +1.67% and 4.04% with an overall district population growth of +3.23%. Residents of Bar Chamarkand comprise 0.26% of the Bajaur District population as of 2017.

=== Language ===
The vast majority of Bar Chamarkand residents expectedly speak Pashto as their mother tongue, the predominant language of ethnic Pakhtuns (Pashtuns) and of the derivatively-named Khyber Pakhtunkhwa Province (KPK). As of 2017, 99.51% of Bar Chamarkand residents recorded Pashto as their mother tongue, while only 14 residents recorded Urdu (8), Brahui (4), Sindhi (1), and Kashmiri (1) as their mother tongues.

=== Religion ===
As of 2017, all 2,868 residents of Bar Chamarkand Tehsil reported belonging to the Muslim faith. Bar Chamarkand and Barang Tehsils were the only two in Bajaur to report 100% Muslim residents, four other tehsils report 99.98% to 99.99% adherence to Islam, and Khar Bajaur Tehsil, containing the district's capital, Khar, hosted 3 Christians, 37 Ahmadi, 6 belonging to caste systems, and 3 reporting 'other'.

=== Politics ===
Bar Chamarkand Tehsil is politically represented in the National Assembly of Pakistan (the lower house of the national parliament) in the NA-8 Bajaur constituency and in the Provincial Assembly of Khyber Pakhtunkhwa in the PK-22 Bajaur-IV constituency. In both bodies, Bar Chamarkand Tehsil (as well as Bajaur District and most of KPK) historically elects candidates from the Pakistan Tehreek-e-Insaf (PTI) party established by Pakistani cricketer and 22nd Prime Minister, Imran Khan, who is seen as a fierce advocate for the nation's Pakhtuns, many of whom feel disenfranchised by Islamabad.

== See also ==
- Mamund Tehsil
- Khar Bajaur Tehsil
- Salarzai Tehsil
- Nawagai Tehsil
- Utman Khel Tehsil
- Barang Tehsil
- Bajaur District
- Khyber Pakhtunkhwa Province
