= Begal =

Begal may refer to:

- Begal, Chakwal, Pakistan
- Begal, Khyber Pakhtunkhwa, Pakistan
