= Mubarak Zeb Khan =

Member of the National Assembly of Pakistan from Bajaur (2024–2029)

- مبارک زیب خان

Special Assistant to Prime Minister for Tribal Affair
- Incumbent
- Assumed office 8 March 2025
- President: Asif Ali Zardari
- Prime Minister: Shehbaz Sharif

Member of the National Assembly of Pakistan
- Incumbent
- Assumed office 13 May 2024
- Constituency: NA-8 Bajaur

Personal details
- Party: PMLN (2025-present)
- Other political affiliations: PMLN (2024-2025); PTI (2024-2024)
- Relatives: Rehan Zeb Khan (brother) Manro KaKa (uncle)

Mubarak Zeb Khan (Urdu: مبارک زیب خان) is a Pakistani politician who has been a member of the National Assembly of Pakistan since August 2024.

== Political career ==
Khan won the 2024 Pakistani by-elections from National Assembly of Pakistan constituency NA-8 Bajaur as an independent candidate supported by Pakistan Tehreek-e-Insaf (PTI). He received 74,008 votes while runner up Gul Zafar Khan of Independent (politician) candidate (PTI) Supported Pakistan Tehreek-e-Insaf, received 47,282 votes. He also won from PK-22 Bajaur-IV constituency of Provincial Assembly of Khyber Pakhtunkhwa during the same election. He received 23,386 votes as an PTI while the runner up Abid Khan of JI received 10,477 votes.

On 14 June 2025, his residence in Bajaur district was fired upon by a rocket, partially damaging the entrance. According to security officials, this was not the first time Khan had been targeted, previously on 14 May an explosion destroyed the gate of the same house.
