= Barang Tehsil =

Pakistani administrative subdivision

Coordinates: 34.6225°N 71.6188°E

Barang Tehsil تحصیل برنگ برنګ تحصیل
- Tehsil
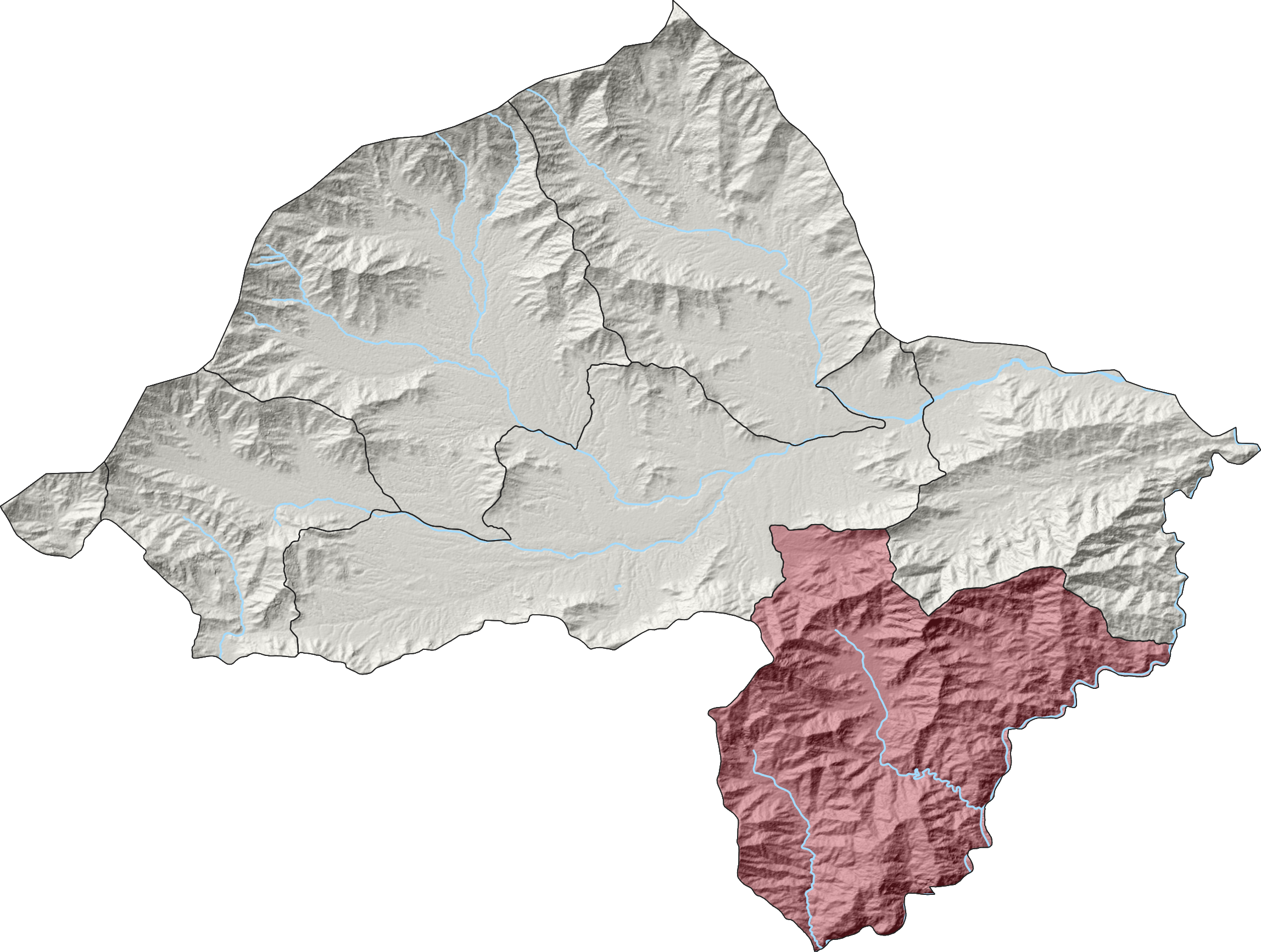
- Barang Tehsil (red) in Bajaur District
- Interactive map of Barang Tehsil
- Country: Pakistan
- Region: Khyber Pakhtunkhwa
- District: Bajaur District
- Headquarters: Maimoola

Population (2017)
  - Total: 76,558
- Time zone: UTC+5 (PST)

Barang Tehsil (Pashto: تحصیل بارنګ) is an administrative subdivision (tehsil) of Bajaur District in Khyber Pakhtunkhwa, Pakistan. Barang is the sixth largest of Bajaur District's seven tehsils.

== History ==
Barang Subdivision was a part of the former Federally Administered Tribal Areas until the region was merged with Khyber Pakhtunkhwa on May 31, 2018. It was a tehsil before the FATA Interim Governance Regulation, 2018 was signed by President Mamnoon Hussain. It was upgraded to a subdivision at the time FATA was merged with Khyber Pakhtunkhwa.

== Geography ==
Barang Tehsil, the second smallest of seven tehsils in Bajaur District, is 159 km^{2} in area, encompasses a series of mountain ravines. Located in the district's southeast corner and jutting southward, Barang Tehsil shares a 21.73 km border with Malakand District's Batkhela Tehsil to the east, a 7.51 km border with Mohmand District's Prang Ghar Tehsil to the south, a 21.53 km border with Mohmand District's Ambar Utmankhel Tehsil to the west, an 11.01 km border with Khar Bajaur Tehsil to the northwest, a 19.95 km border with Utman Khel Tehsil to the northeast, and a short 0.65 km border with Lower Dir District's Timergara Tehsil.

== Demographics ==
Historical population
Year	Pop.	±% p.a.
1981	44,048	—
1998	50,139	+0.76%
2017	76,558	+2.25%

=== Population ===
As of the 2017 Pakistani national census, Barang Tehsil has a population of 76,558 people and 10,511 households, representing a +2.24% population increase from its 1998 census population of 50,139 compared to a +3.23% population growth in the overall Bajaur District. Residents of Barang comprise 7.01% of the Bajaur District population as of 2017.

=== Language ===
The vast majority of Barang residents expectedly speak Pashto as their mother tongue, the predominant language of ethnic Pakhtuns (Pashtuns) and of the derivatively-named Khyber Pakhtunkhwa Province (KPK). As of 2017, 99.46% of Barang residents recorded Pashto as their mother tongue with other residents recording Urdu (182), Brahui (63), Sindhi (26), Saraiki (22), Balochi (11), Kashmiri (10), Punjabi (7), and others (26), as mother tongues.

=== Religion ===
As of 2017, all 76,558 residents of Barang Tehsil reported belonging to the Muslim faith. Barang and Bar Chamarkand Tehsils were the only two in Bajaur to report 100% Muslim residents; four other tehsils report 99.98% to 99.99% adherence to Islam, and Khar Bajaur Tehsil, containing the district's capital, Khar, hosted 3 Christians, 37 Ahmadi, 6 belonging to caste systems, and 3 reporting 'other'.

=== Politics ===
Barang Tehsil is politically represented in the National Assembly of Pakistan (the lower house of the national parliament) in the NA-8 Bajaur constituency and in the Provincial Assembly of Khyber Pakhtunkhwa in the PK-21 Bajaur-III constituency. In both bodies, Barang Tehsil (as well as Bajaur District and most of KPK) historically elects candidates from the Pakistan Tehreek-e-Insaf (PTI) party established by Pakistani cricketer and 22nd Prime Minister, Imran Khan, who is seen as a fierce advocate for the nation's Pakhtuns, many of whom feel disenfranchised by Islamabad.

== See also ==
- Mamund Tehsil
- Khar Bajaur Tehsil
- Salarzai Tehsil
- Nawagai Tehsil
- Utman Khel Tehsil
- Bar Charmer Kand Tehsil
- Bajaur District
- Khyber Pakhtunkhwa Province
