= Pashat =

Town in Khyber Pakhtunkhwa, Pakistan

Pashat پاشٹ پاشټ
- Town
- Pashat
- Location in Khyber Pakhtunkhwa, Pakistan
- Coordinates: 34°52′N 71°32′E
- Country: Pakistan
- Province: Khyber Pakhtunkhwa
- District: Bajaur District
- Tehsil: Salarzai Tehsil

Population (2017)
  - Total: 5,111
- Time zone: UTC+5 (PST)

Pashat (Urdu: پاشٹ; Pashto: پاشټ) is a town and the administrative headquarters of Salarzai Tehsil in Bajaur District, Khyber Pakhtunkhwa, Pakistan. According to the 2017 Census of Pakistan, the town had a population of 5,111.

== Geography ==
Pashat is situated in the mountainous terrain of Salarzai Tehsil in eastern Bajaur District. The town is surrounded by valleys, agricultural land, and hills, and serves as the principal administrative and commercial center of the tehsil.

== Administration ==
Pashat functions as the headquarters of Salarzai Tehsil, where the principal administrative offices of the tehsil are located. It also serves as a local center for public services, commerce, and education for surrounding villages.

== Economy ==
The local economy is primarily based on agriculture, livestock rearing, small businesses, and trade with neighboring settlements. Rice, maize, and wheat are among the major agricultural crops cultivated in the surrounding areas.

== Tourism ==
Pashat serves as the main gateway to several scenic locations in Salarzai Tehsil. Nearby attractions include Bakhai (Nanser), Batwar, Danqool, and the terraced rice fields of Salarzai. The surrounding mountains, natural springs, and rural landscapes attract local visitors, particularly during the summer months.

== History ==
Pashat has traditionally served as an important settlement of the Salarzai area and remains the administrative center of the tehsil. The town has also hosted local jirgas and administrative meetings concerning regional affairs.

== See also ==
- Salarzai Tehsil
- Bajaur District
- Salarzai (tribe)
- Khyber Pakhtunkhwa
