= Maimoola =

Coordinates: 34°38′N 71°37′E

- Location within FATA Location within Pakistan
- Country: Pakistan
- Region: Federally Administered Tribal Areas
- District: Bajaur Agency
- Tehsil: Barang

Population (2017)
  - Total: 530
- Time zone: UTC+5 (PST)

Maimoola or Memola is an area serving as the headquarters of Barang Tehsil, Bajaur Agency, Federally Administered Tribal Areas, Pakistan. As of 2017, the population is 530.
