= Khar Bajaur Tehsil =

Pakistani administrative subdivision

Coordinates: 34.7227°N 71.4952°E

Khar Bajaur Tehsil تحصیل خار باجوڑ ښار باجوړ تحصیل
- Tehsil
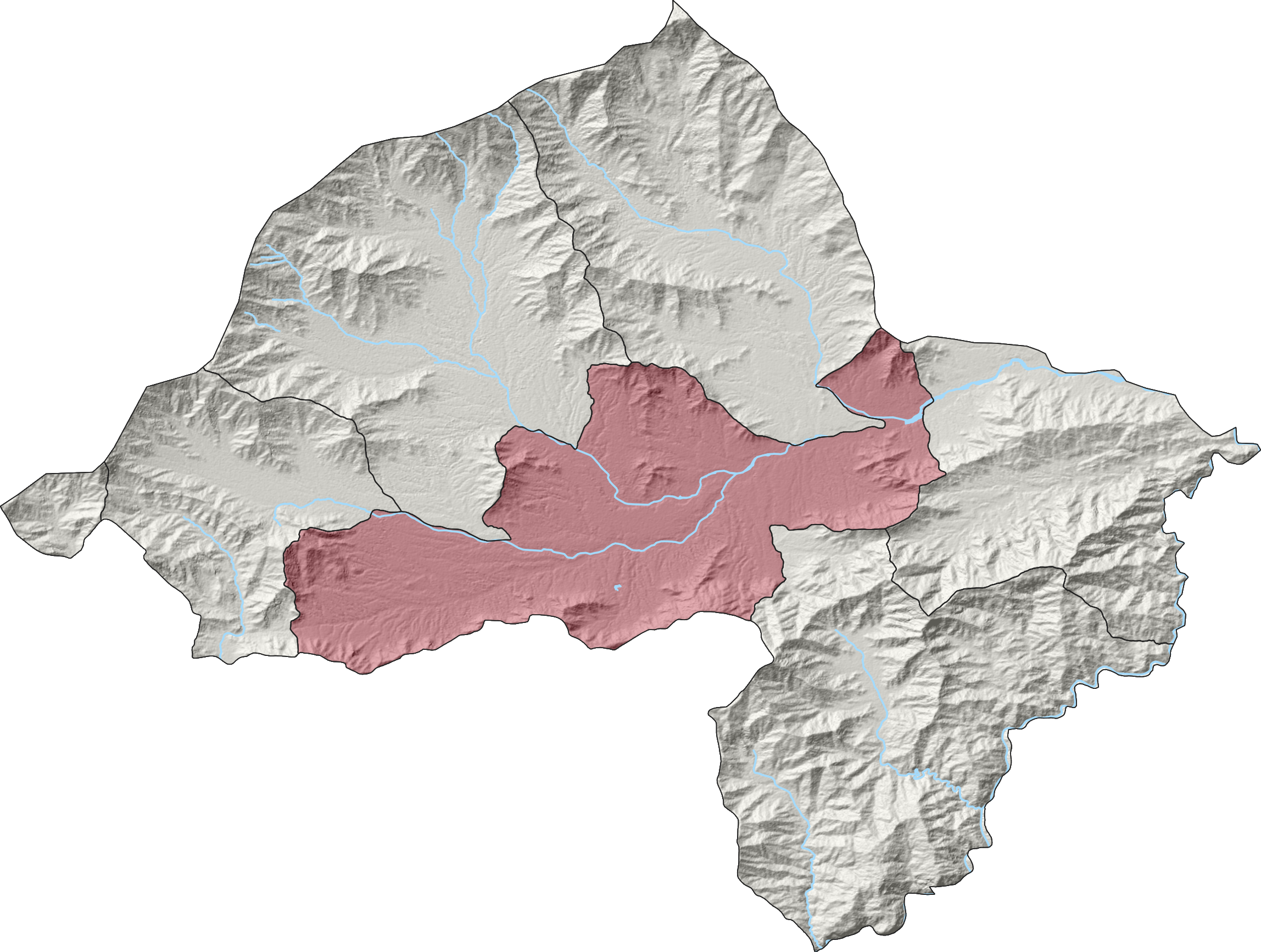
- Khar Bajaur Tehsil (red) in Bajaur District
- Interactive map of Khar Bajaur Tehsil
- Country: Pakistan
- Region: Khyber Pakhtunkhwa
- District: Bajaur District

Government
  - Chairman: Sayed Badshah (JUI(F))

Population (2017)
  - Total: 247,510
- Time zone: UTC+5 (PST)

Khar Bajaur Tehsil (Pashto: خار باجوړ تحصیل), sometimes shortened to Khar Tehsil, is an administrative subdivision (tehsil) of Bajaur District in Khyber Pakhtunkhwa, Pakistan. Khar Bajaur is the second largest of Bajaur District's seven tehsils.

== History ==
Khar Bajaur was part of the former Federally Administered Tribal Areas until the region was merged with Khyber Pakhtunkhwa on May 31, 2018.

== Geography ==
Khar Bajaur Tehsil, the second largest in Bajaur District, is 238 km^{2} in area and encompasses the district's largest, flattest mountain valley. Representing the center of the district, Khar Bajaur borders every tehsil in Bajaur District except for Bar Chamarkand far to the west. Khar Bajaur Tehsil shares a 13.10 km border with Utman Khel Tehsil to the east, an 11.92 km border with Barang Tehsil to the southeast, a 21.08 km border with Mohmand District's Ambar Utmankhel Tehsil to the south, a 3.22 km border with Mohmand District's Pandiali Tehsil to the southwest, a 13.24 km border with Nawagai Tehsil to the west, a 23.82 km border with Mamund Tehsil to the north, and a 22.80 km border with Salarzai Tehsil to the northeast.

== Demographics ==
Historical population
| Year | Pop. | ±% p.a. |
|---|---|---|
| 1981 | 36,874 | — |
| 1998 | 116,196 | +6.98% |
| 2017 | 247,510 | +4.06% |

=== Population ===
As of the 2017 Pakistani national census, Khar Bajaur Tehsil has a population of 247,510 people and 27,044 households, representing a +4.04% population increase from its 1998 census population of 116,196 compared to a +3.23% population growth in the overall Bajaur District. Residents of Khar Bajaur comprise 22.63% of the Bajaur District population as of 2017.

=== Language ===
The vast majority of Khar Bajaur residents expectedly speak Pashto as their mother tongue, the predominant language of ethnic Pakhtuns (Pashtuns) and of the derivatively-named Khyber Pakhtunkhwa Province (KPK). As of 2017, 98.78% of Khar Bajaur residents recorded Pashto as their mother tongue with other residents recording Urdu (1,165), Brahui (416), Punjabi (189), Balochi (151), Sindhi (129), Kashmiri (108), Saraiki (86), Hindko (11), and 'other' (127) as mother tongues. Khar Bajaur is the most linguistically-diverse tehsil in Bajaur District.

=== Religion ===
As of 2017, 99.91% of Khar Bajaur Tehsil residents reported belonging to the Islamic faith along with 158 Christians, 53 Ahmadi, 5 belonging to a caste system, and 14 belonging to 'other'. Khar Bajaur is the most religiously-diverse tehsil in Bajaur District.

=== Politics ===
Khar Bajaur Tehsil is politically represented in the National Assembly of Pakistan (the lower house of the national parliament) in the NA-8 Bajaur constituency and in the Provincial Assembly of Khyber Pakhtunkhwa in the PK-21 Bajaur-III (Gujran, Pachagan, Paindakhel, Mandal, and Alizai sections) and PK-22 Bajaur-IV (remaining sections) constituencies. In both bodies, Khar Bajaur Tehsil (as well as Bajaur District and most of KPK) historically elects candidates from the Pakistan Tehreek-e-Insaf (PTI) party established by Pakistani cricketer and 22nd Prime Minister, Imran Khan, who is seen as a fierce advocate for the nation's Pakhtuns, many of whom feel disenfranchised by Islamabad.

== See also ==
- Mamund Tehsil
- Salarzai Tehsil
- Nawagai Tehsil
- Utman Khel Tehsil
- Barang Tehsil
- Bar Charmer Kand Tehsil
- Bajaur District
- Khyber Pakhtunkhwa Province
