= Nawagai Tehsil =

Pakistani administrative subdivision

Coordinates: 34.66724°N 71.29373°E

Nawagai Tehsil تحصیل ناواگئ ناوګي تحصیل
- Tehsil
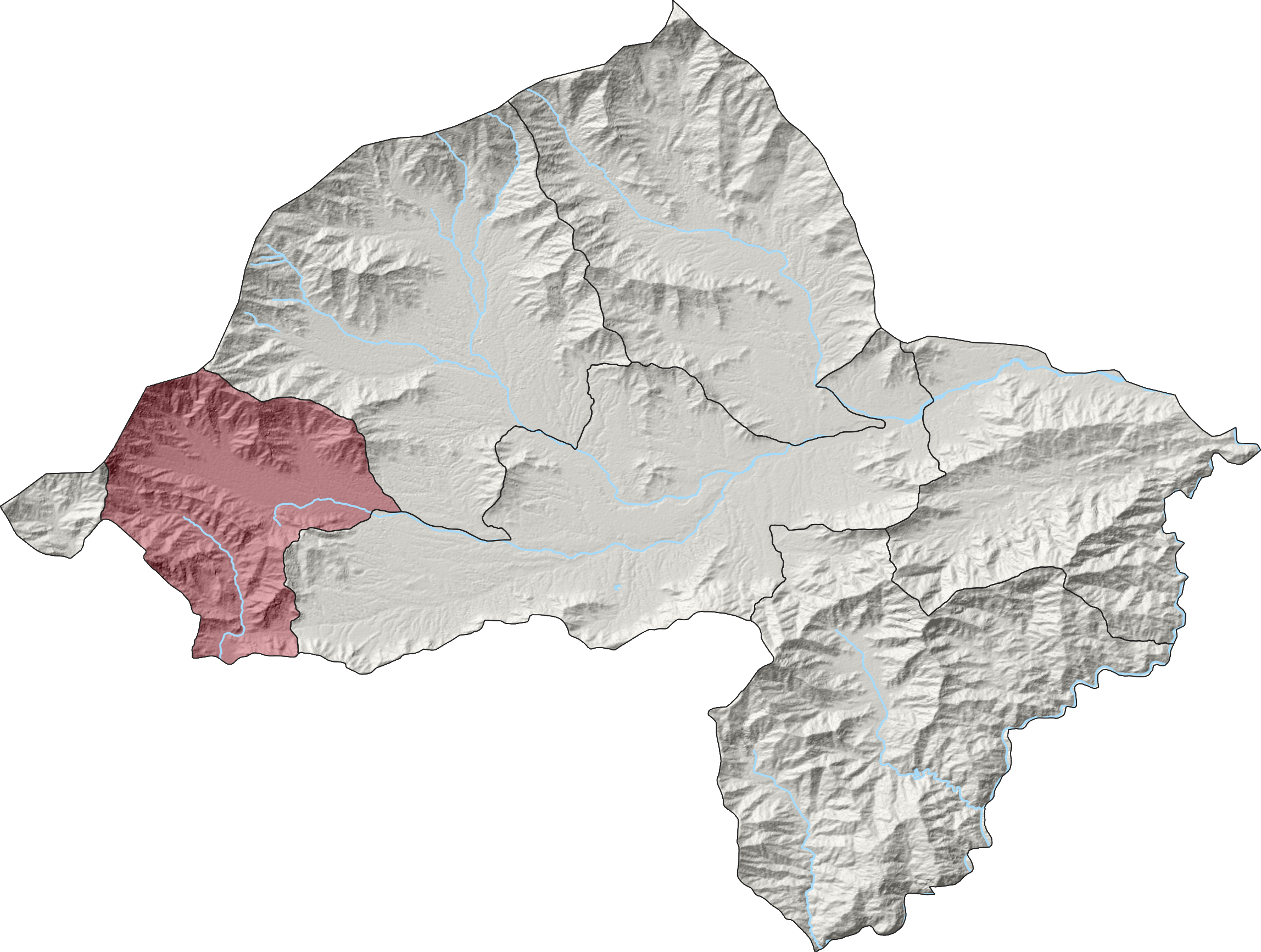
- Nawagai Tehsil (red) in Bajaur District
- Country: Pakistan
- Region: Khyber Pakhtunkhwa
- District: Bajaur District
- Headquarters: Nawagai

Population (2017)
  - Total: 79,002
- Time zone: UTC+5 (PST)

Nawagai Tehsil (Pashto: تحصیل ناوګای)is an administrative subdivision (tehsil) of Bajaur District in Khyber Pakhtunkhwa Province, Pakistan. Nawagai is the fourth largest of Bajaur District's seven tehsils.

== Geography ==
Nawagai Tehsil, the fourth largest in Bajaur District, is 216 km^{2} in area and encompasses a valley and parallel ravine separated by a mountain range extending from the border with Afghanistan. Representing Bajaur District's left shoulder, Nawagai shares a 3.14 km border with Bar Chamarkand Tehsil to the west, a 13.58 km border with Mohmand District's Safi Tehsil to the southwest, 1.58 km border with Mohmand District's Pandiali Tehsil to the south, a 13.28 km border with Khar to the southeast, a 13.06 km border with Mamund Tehsil to the northeast, a 2.48 km border with Afghanistan's Marawara District, Kunar Province to the north, and a 4.38 km border with Afghanistan's Sirkanay District, Kunar Province to the northwest.

== Demographics ==
=== Population ===
As of the 2017 Pakistani national census, Nawagai Tehsil has a population of 78,494 people, representing a +1.67% population increase from its 1998 census population of 57,264 compared to a +3.23% population growth in the overall Bajaur District. Residents of Nawagai comprise 7.19% of the Bajaur District population as of 2017.

=== Language ===
The vast majority of Nawagai residents expectedly speak Pashto as their mother tongue, the predominant language of ethnic Pakhtuns (Pashtuns) and of the derivatively-named Khyber Pakhtunkhwa Province (KPK). As of 2017, 99.35% of Nawagai residents recorded Pashto as their mother tongue with other residents recording Urdu (268), Brahui (100), Sindhi (35), Kashmiri (33), Punjabi (29), Saraiki (23), and 11 'others' as mother tongues.

=== Religion ===
As of 2017, 99.98% of Nawagai Tehsil residents reported belonging to the Islamic faith along with 15 Ahmadi and 2 Christians.

=== Politics ===
Nawagai Tehsil is politically represented in the National Assembly of Pakistan (the lower house of the national parliament) in the NA-8 Bajaur constituency and in the Provincial Assembly of Khyber Pakhtunkhwa in the PK-22 Bajaur-IV constituency. In both bodies, Nawagai Tehsil (as well as Bajaur District and most of KPK) historically elects candidates from the Pakistan Tehreek-e-Insaf (PTI) party established by Pakistani cricketer and 22nd Prime Minister, Imran Khan, who is seen as a fierce advocate for the nation's Pakhtuns, many of whom feel disenfranchised by Islamabad.

== See also ==
- Mamund Tehsil
- Khar Bajaur Tehsil
- Salarzai Tehsil
- Utman Khel Tehsil
- Barang Tehsil
- Bar Charmer Kand Tehsil
