= Gul Zafar Khan =

Pakistani politician

Member of the National Assembly of Pakistan
- In office 13 August 2018 – 25 January 2023
- Constituency: NA-41 (Tribal Area-II)

Personal details
- Party: PTI (2018-present)

Gul Zafar Khan (Urdu: گل ظفر خان) is a Pakistani politician who had been a member of the National Assembly of Pakistan from August 2018 till January 2023.

== Early life ==
He used to work as a waiter before entering politics. Gul Zafar Khan was born in 1977 in the village of Bargatki near Pak-Afghan border in Wara Mamund Tehsil, Bajaur District, his father's name is AsalatKhan. He got his primary education from the primary school of his village. But due to poverty and other reasons, he left education and started working in Karachi. The News International reported he was a millionaire.

== Political career ==
He was elected to the National Assembly of Pakistan as a candidate of Pakistan Tehreek-e-Insaf (PTI) from Constituency NA-41 (Tribal Area-II) in the 2018 Pakistani general election. He received 22,730 votes and defeated an independent candidate, Qari Abdul Majeed.

== Performance ==
Gul Zafar Khan works on blacktop roads and streets. A large job component for members of the National Assembly is solarization systems in worship places (mosques). He delegated works in Zagai, Badan, Gatky, Salarzo and other areas.

== More Reading ==
- List of members of the 15th National Assembly of Pakistan
