= Akhunzada Chattan =

Pakistani politician

- اخونزاده چټان

Member of the National Assembly of Pakistan
- In office 2008–2013
- Constituency: NA-44 (Tribal Area-IX)

Personal details
- Born: January 20, 1968 (age 58) Amankot, Bajaur Agency, Federally Administered Tribal Areas (in present-day Khyber Pakhtunkhwa), Pakistan
- Party: IND (2025-present)
- Other political affiliations: PPP (2008-2025)
- Education: University of Peshawar

Syed Akhunzada Chattan (Pashto: سيد اخونزاده چټان; Urdu: سيد اخونزاده چٹان; also spelled Akhonzada Chitan) is a Pakistani politician and leader of the Pakistan Peoples Party (PPP) in Bajaur, Khyber Pakhtunkhwa. He was formerly the president of the FATA Political Alliance, which campaigned for the rights of the people of former Federally Administered Tribal Areas. He was a member of the National Assembly of Pakistan from 2008 to 2013.

On 17 August 2015, his 9-year-old son Hussain Shah was kidnapped by gunmen in Bajaur but rescued the next day. On the midnight between 17 and 18 March 2018, militants attacked Chattan's house in Amankot, Bajaur with a rocket that hit the mud-made boundary wall of the house. Chattan was home at the time but no one was injured in the attack. PPP chairman Bilawal Bhutto Zardari condemned the attack and PPP workers visited the house to express solidarity with Chattan.

== Political beginnings ==
Chattan has been affiliated with the Pakistan Peoples Party (PPP) and its student wing, the Peoples' Students Federation (PSF), since his student life. He became the divisional president of PSF Malakand Division in 1985. When be started studying at the University of Peshawar's Fine Arts Department in 1990, he remained an active leader of the PSF. He was elevated to the position of the provincial chairman of PSF for the North-West Frontier Province (now known as Khyber Pakhtunkhwa) in 1993.

== Political career ==
He was elected to the National Assembly of Pakistan from Constituency NA-44 (Tribal Area-IX) as an independent candidate in the 2008 Pakistani general election. He received 6,257 votes and defeated independent candidate Shahab Uddin Khan.

He ran for the seat of the National Assembly from Constituency NA-44 (Tribal Area-IX) as a candidate of the Pakistan Peoples Party (PPP) in the 2013 Pakistani general election, but was unsuccessful. He received 4,127 votes and lost the seat to Shahab Uddin Khan, who was then a candidate of the Pakistan Muslim League (N).

== See also ==
- Farhatullah Babar
- Faisal Karim Kundi
- Ahmad Kundi
