= Utman Khel Tehsil =

Pakistani administrative subdivision

Coordinates: 34.7433°N 71.7023°E

Utman Khel Tehsil تحصیل اتمان خیل اتمان خيل تحصیل
- Tehsil
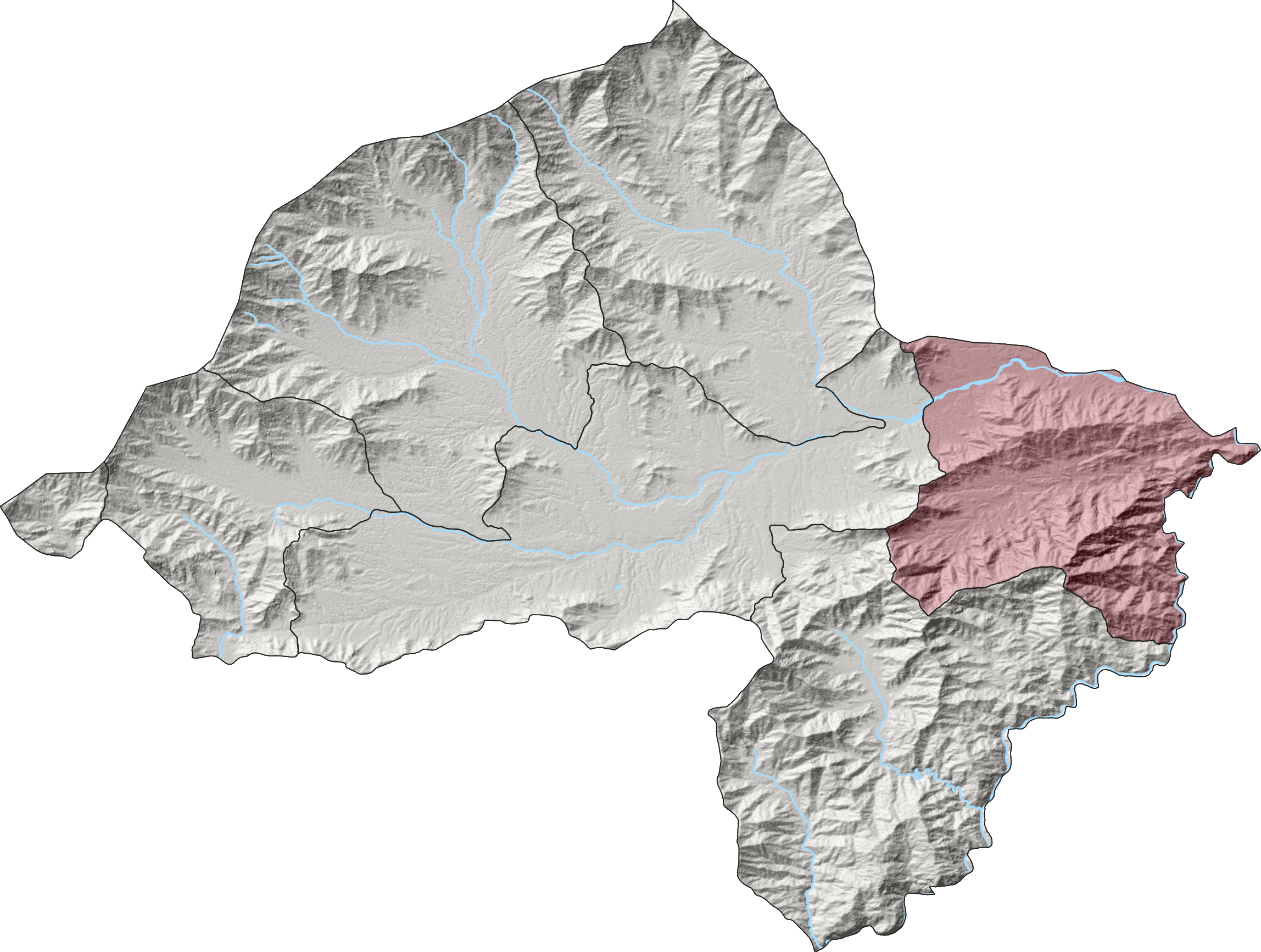
- Utman Khel Tehsil (red) in Bajaur District
- Country: Pakistan
- Region: Khyber Pakhtunkhwa
- District: Bajaur District

Population (2017)
  - Total: 107,356
- Time zone: UTC+5 (PST)

Utman Khel Tehsil (Pashto: اتمان خيل تحصیل) is an administrative subdivision (tehsil) of Bajaur District in Khyber Pakhtunkhwa Province, Pakistan. Utman Khel is the fifth largest of Bajaur District's seven tehsils.

== Geography ==
Utman Khel Tehsil, the fifth largest in Bajaur District, is 194 km^{2} in area and centers around a shallow, 14.28 km mountain valley and the reverses of much of surrounding mountains. Representing Bajaur District's central-eastern shoulder, Utman Khel shares a 19.95 km border with Barang Tehsil to the south, a 13.30 km border with Khar Bajaur Tehsil to the west, a 18.13 km border with Lower Dir District's Munda Tehsil, and a 19.73 km border with Lower Dir District's Timergara Tehsil.

== Demographics ==
=== Population ===
As of the 2017 Pakistani national census, Utman Khel Tehsil has a population of 107,248 people, representing a 3.25% population increase from its 1998 census population of 58,348 compared to a +3.23% population growth in the overall Bajaur District. Residents of Utman Khel comprise 9.83% of the Bajaur District population as of 2017.

The tehsil is named after the inhabiting Pakthun Utmankhel tribe of the Karlani tribal confederacy.

=== Language ===
The vast majority of Utman Khel residents expectedly speak Pashto as their mother tongue, the predominant language of ethnic Pakhtuns (Pashtuns) and of the derivatively-named Khyber Pakhtunkhwa Province (KPK). As of 2017, 99.03% of Utman Khel residents recorded Pashto as their mother tongue with other residents recording Urdu (408), Sindhi (163), Brahui (120), Balochi (61), Kashmiri (47), Saraiki (47), Punjabi (37), and 'other' (155) as mother tongues.

=== Religion ===
As of 2017, 99.98% of Utman Khel Tehsil residents reported belonging to the Islamic faith along with 13 Ahmadi residents, 2 Christians, and 2 residents belonging to caste systems.

=== Politics ===
Utman Khel Tehsil is politically represented in the National Assembly of Pakistan (the lower house of the national parliament) in the NA-40 Bajaur-I constituency and in the Provincial Assembly of Khyber Pakhtunkhwa in the PK-20 Bajaur-II constituency. In both bodies, Utman Khel Tehsil (as well as Bajaur District and most of KPK) historically elects candidates from the Pakistan Tehreek-e-Insaf (PTI) party established by Pakistani cricketer and 22nd Prime Minister, Imran Khan, who is seen as a fierce advocate for the nation's Pakhtuns, many of whom feel disenfranchised by Islamabad.

== See also ==
- Mamund Tehsil
- Khar Bajaur Tehsil
- Salarzai Tehsil
- Nawagai Tehsil
- Barang Tehsil
- Bar Charmer Kand Tehsil
- Bajaur District
- Khyber Pakhtunkhwa Province
