= Humayun Khan (politician) =

Pakistani politician

- ہمایون خان

Special Assistant to Chief Minister for Prisons on Khyber Pakhtunkhwa
- In office 13 September 2024 – 13 October 2025
- Chief Minister: Ali Amin Gandapur

Member of the Provincial Assembly of Khyber Pakhtunkhwa
- Incumbent
- Assumed office 29 February 2024
- Constituency: PK-15 Lower Dir-II
- In office 13 August 2018 – 18 January 2023
- Constituency: PK-14 (Lower Dir-II)

Personal details
- Born: 4 October 1960 (age 65) Lower Dir District, Khyber Pakhtunkhwa, Pakistan
- Party: PTI (2018-present)
- Education: B.A, L.L.B
- Alma mater: University of Peshawar
- Website: https://prisons.kp.gov.pk/officers-profiles/

Humayun Khan (Urdu: ہمایون خان; born 10 April 1960) is a Pakistani politician, businessman and landlord by profession and current Member of the Provincial Assembly (MPA) from Dir Lower (PK-15) since February 2024. He previously served in the Provincial Assembly of Khyber Pakhtunkhwa from August 2018 to January 2023. He is also the Special Assistant to the Chief Minister of Khyber Pakhtunkhwa on Prisons, focusing on prison reforms and governance.

== Political career ==
He has earned B.A L.L.B Degree in his educational profile and is a businessman and landlord by profession. Earlier he was elected as Member KP Assembly in the 2018 General Elections from PTI as political party. He started politics in 1979 and elected as District Council Member in the same year as independent candidate. He again got elected on the same position in 1983 and 1987 respectively. He later contested the 1988 and 2002 General Elections as an independent candidate. He was elected to the Provincial Assembly of Khyber Pakhtunkhwa as a candidate of Pakistan Tehreek-e-Insaf from Constituency PK-14 (Lower Dir-II) in the 2018 Pakistani general election.
