= Rehan Zeb Khan =

Pakistani politician (died 2024)

- ریحان زیب خان
- Died: 31 January 2024
- Occupation: Politician
- Known for: Leader of Pakistan's Tehreek-e-Insaf (PTI) party
- Political party: Pakistan Tehreek-e-Insaf
- Relatives: Mubarak Zeb Khan (brother)

Rehan Zeb Khan (Urdu: ریحان زیب خان; died 31 January 2024) was a Pakistani politician who was a leader of the Pakistan Tehreek-e-Insaf (PTI) party. He was an election candidate in NA-8 Bajaur participating in the 8 February 2024 elections.

== Career ==
Khan was an independent candidate in the 8 February elections who claimed the support of former Prime Minister Imran Khan's party. Despite the ban on PTI from contesting elections due to a recent court order, Khan was contesting the National Assembly seat from Bajaur constituency. The deceased Rehan Zeb was a supporter of PTI, but after not getting PTI tickets, he raised questions on social media about the distribution of tickets. PTI has given party ticket for National Assembly in NA-8 to Gul Zafar Khan while PK-22 ticket to Gul Dad Khan. Rehanzeb was participating in the National and Provincial Assembly elections as an independent candidate. Rehanzeb had also exposed the corruption in the Khyber Pakhtunkhwa government on 12 January, after which he was being criticized by troll accounts linked to Tehreek-e-Insaf declared him as party-backed candidate on official accounts, then removed the statement.

== Assassination ==
Rehan Zeib Khan was assassinated on 31 January 2024 during the election campaign in Sadiqabad Phatak Bazar Main Chowk in Bajaur district, Khyber Pakhtunkhwa. Three of his supporters were also shot and injured.

Khan's killing sparked fears of an increase in violence surrounding the parliamentary vote. His death was a major event before the 2024 general elections.
