= Bismillah Khan (politician) =

Pakistani politician

- بسم اللہ خان

Member of the National Assembly of Pakistan
- In office 1 June 2013 – 31 May 2018
- Constituency: NA-43 (Bajaur Agency)

Personal details
- Born: 9 August 1948 (age 77)

Bismillah Khan (Urdu: بسم اللہ خان; born 9 August 1948) is a Pakistani politician who had been a member of the National Assembly of Pakistan from June 2013 to May 2018.

== Early life ==
He was born on 9 August 1948 to Khan Masoom Jan Khan.

== Political career ==
He was elected to the National Assembly of Pakistan as an independent candidate from Constituency NA-43 (Tribal Area-VIII) in the 2013 Pakistani general election. He received 13,929 votes and defeated Zaffar Khan, a candidate of Pakistan Tehreek-e-Insaf.
