= PK-22 Bajaur-IV =

Constituency of the provincial assembly of Khyber Pakhtunkhwa

- Constituency for the Khyber Pakhtunkhwa Assembly
- Region: Nawagai Tehsil, Khar and Wara Mund Tehsils (partly) of Bajaur District

Current constituency
- Created: 2024
- Created from: PK-18 Bajaur-I (2022-2023)

PK-22 Bajaur-IV (پی کے-22 باجوڑ-4) is a constituency for the Khyber Pakhtunkhwa Assembly of the Khyber Pakhtunkhwa province of Pakistan.It was created after 2023 Delimitations when Bajaur District gained 1 seat.

== Members of Assembly ==
=== 2024-: PK-22 Bajaur-IV ===
Election	Member	Party
2024	TBD	TBD

== Election 2024 ==
Elections were scheduled to be held on 8 February 2024 but postponed due to Assassination of an Independent candidate.

2024 Pakistani by-elections: PK-22 Bajaur-IV
Party	Candidate	Votes	%	±%
Independent	Mubarak Zeb Khan	23,386	49.58	
JI	Abid Khan	10,477	22.21	
SIC	Gul Dad Khan	7,063	14.97	
ANP	Shah Naseer Khan	2,295	4.86	
Independent	Noor Shah	1,835	3.89	
Others	Others (eight candidates)	2,114	4.48	
Turnout		49,660	28.24	
Total valid votes		47,170	94.98	
Rejected ballots		2,490	5.02	
Majority		12,909	27.37	
Registered electors		175,837		

== By-election 2024 ==
A by-election was held on 11 July 2024.

2024 Pakistani by-elections: PK-22 Bajaur-IV
Party	Candidate	Votes	%	±%
ANP	Muhammad Nisar	11,926	26.57	
Independent	Najeeb Ullah Khan	10,622	23.66	
JI	Abid Khan	10,593	23.60	
SIC	Rahat Ullah	7,146	15.92	
Independent	Akhtar Gul	3,556	7.92	
Others	Others (seven candidates)	1,045	2.33	
Turnout		45,801	25.59	
Total valid votes		44,888	98.01	
Rejected ballots		913	1.99	
Majority		1,304	2.91	
Registered electors		179,010		

== See also ==
- PK-21 Bajaur-III
- PK-23 Malakand-I
