= Ambar Utmankhel Tehsil =

Ambar Utmankhel Tehsil تحصیل امبر اتمان خیل امبر اتمان خېل تحصیل
- Tehsil
- Country: Pakistan
- Region: Khyber Pakhtunkhwa
- District: Mohmand District

Population (2017)
  - Total: 62,109
- Time zone: UTC+5 (PST)

Ambar Utmankhel Tehsil is a subdivision located in Mohmand District, Khyber Pakhtunkhwa, Pakistan. The population is 62,109 according to the 2017 census.

== See also ==
- List of tehsils of Khyber Pakhtunkhwa
