= PK-15 Lower Dir-II =

Provincial constituency in Pakistan

- Constituency for the Khyber Pakhtunkhwa Assembly
- Region: Adenzai Tehsil (excluding Khadagzai village) in Lower Dir District

Current constituency
- Party: Pakistan Tehreek-e-Insaf
- Member: Humayun Khan
- Created from: PK-97 Lower Dir-IV (2002-2018); PK-14 Lower Dir-II (2018-2023)

PK-15 Lower Dir-II (پی کے-15 دیر زیریں-2) is a constituency for the Khyber Pakhtunkhwa Assembly of the Khyber Pakhtunkhwa province of Pakistan.

== Summary ==
Elections	Registered Voters	Votes polled	Valid Votes	Rejected Votes	Percentage^{1}
October 2002	73992	24728	24104	624	33.42%
February 2008	0	0	0	0	0%
May 2013	131441	0	0	0	32.65%

1 » Percentage of Votes Polled to Registered Voters

== Elections 2013 ==
General election were held on May 11, 2013 in Pakistan. The total number of registered votes was 131,441 according to the Election Commission of Pakistan. The percentage of votes polled to registered voters was 32.65%. Like previous elections women were intimidated from voting and only a few women voted. The following table shows the names of the candidates and their parties and the votes they secured in the elections.

Contesting candidates	Party affiliation	Votes polled
Bakht Baidar	Qoumi Wattan Party	10965
Sultanat Yar	Jamaat-e-Islami Pakistan	7628
Zakirullah Khan	Pakistan Peoples Party Parliamentarians	6200
Gul Nasib Khan	Jamiat Ulama-e-Islam (F)	4710
Malak Fakhru Zaman Khan	Pakistan Tehreek-e-Insaf	4396
Hussain Shah	Awami National Party	4279
Said Ghani	Pakistan Muslim League (N)	2259
Zainul Arifin	Pakistan Sunni Tehreek	394
Salim Khan	Independent	309
Khwaja Faizul Akram	Tehreek-e-Tahaffuze Pakistan	205
Sartaj	Pukhtoonkhwa Milli Awami Party	170
Fazal Ghafar	Independent	106
Mumtaz Mahmood	Independent	87

== Elections 2008 ==
The winner of the General elections 2008 in this constituency was Zakir Ullah Khan. He was a candidate of the Pakistan Peoples Party Parliamentarians.

== Elections 2002 ==
The winner of the General elections 2002 in this constituency was Zakir Ullah Khan. He was a candidate of the Muttahidda Majlis-e-Amal Pakistan.

Contesting candidates	Party affiliation	Votes polled
Zakir Ullah Khan	Muttahidda Majlis-e-Amal Pakistan	11681
Muhammad Ishaq	Pakistan Peoples Party (Sherpao)	7553
Hamayun Khan	Pakistan Peoples Party Parliamentarians	3029
Muhammad Farid Khan	Pakistan Muslim League (N)	648
Sardar Abdul Hakim Tajik	Pakistan Muslim League(QA)	485
Fakhruzaman Khan	Pakistan Tehreek-e-Insaf	426
Muhammad Shahab Khan	Pakistan Pakhtoonkhawa Milli Awami Party	282

== See also ==
- PK-14 Lower Dir-I
- PK-16 Lower Dir-III
