= Shahab Uddin Khan =

Pakistani politician

- شہاب الدین خان

Member of the National Assembly of Pakistan
- In office 1 June 2013 – 31 May 2018
- Constituency: NA-44 (Bajaur Agency)

Personal details
- Born: 1 January 1965 (age 61)
- Party: PMLN (2013-present)

Shahab Uddin Khan (Urdu: شہاب الدین خان; born 1 January 1965) is a Pakistani politician who was a member of the National Assembly of Pakistan from June 2013 to May 2018.

== Early life ==
Khan was born on 1 January 1965.

== Political career ==
Khan ran for the seat of the National Assembly of Pakistan as an independent candidate from Constituency NA-44 (Tribal Area-IX) in the 2002 Pakistani general election but was unsuccessful. He secured 8,465 votes and lost the seat to an independent candidate Haroon Rashid.

Khan ran for the seat of National Assembly as an independent candidate from Constituency NA-44 (Tribal Area-IX) in the 2008 Pakistani general election but was unsuccessful. He secured only 5,203 votes and lost the seat to independent candidate Akhunzada Chattan.

He was elected to the National Assembly as a candidate of Pakistan Muslim League (N) from Constituency NA-44 (Tribal Area-IX) in the 2013 Pakistani general election. He received 15,114 votes and defeated Sardar Khan, a candidate of Jamaat-e-Islami Pakistan.
