= Shafi Ullah =

Pakistani politician

Member of the Provincial Assembly of Khyber Pakhtunkhwa
- In office 13 August 2018 – 18 January 2023
- Constituency: PK-15 (Lower Dir-III)

Personal details
- Party: PTI (2018-present)

Shafi Ullah is a Pakistani politician who had been a member of the Provincial Assembly of Khyber Pakhtunkhwa from August 2018 till January 2023. He was Special Assistant to the Chief Minister on Prisons Khyber Pakhtunkhwa.

== Political career ==
He was elected to the Provincial Assembly of Khyber Pakhtunkhwa as a candidate of Pakistan Tehreek-e-Insaf from Constituency PK-15 (Lower Dir-III) in the 2018 Pakistani general election.
