= Gul Dad Khan =

Pakistani politician

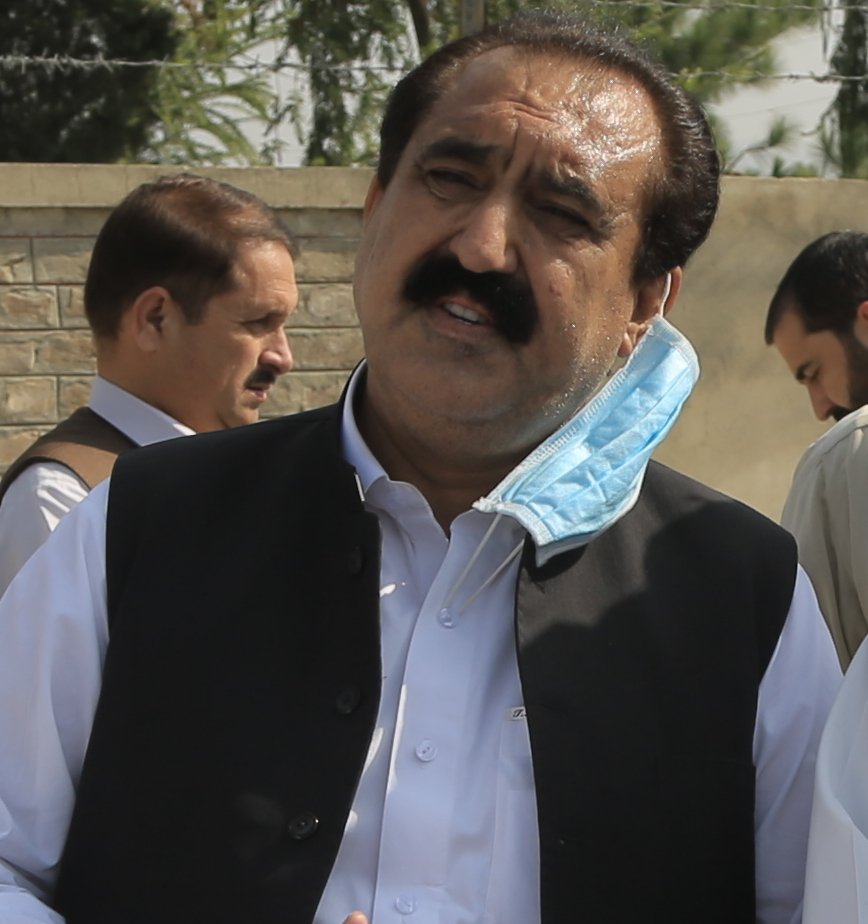
- Gul Dad Khan

Member of the National Assembly of Pakistan
- In office 13 August 2018 – 20 January 2023
- Constituency: NA-40 (Tribal Area-I)

Personal details
- Party: PTI (2018-present)

Gul Dad Khan is a Pakistani politician who had been a member of the National Assembly of Pakistan from August 2018 until January 2023.

== Political career ==
He was elected to the National Assembly of Pakistan as a candidate of Pakistan Tehreek-e-Insaf (PTI) from Constituency NA-40 (Tribal Area-I) in the 2018 Pakistani general election. He received 34,616 votes and defeated an independent candidate, Sardar Khan.
