= Khadagzai =

Coordinates: 34°38′N 71°53′E

Khadagzai (Pashto: Urdu: خادگزئی) is a village in the administrative unit (Union council) Chakdara, of district Lower Dir in the Khyber Pakhtunkhwa province of Pakistan. Situated on the bank of River Swat. Historically the village is home of the Yousafzai Pukhtoon tribes notably Maadokhiel(مدوخیل) Aka khiel(اکاخیل)The village is divided into three major units (Kozkalai, Barkalai, and Seerai).Khadagzai is subtribe of Yousafzai .The outskirts are connected with small villages like Mayar, Nagram, Bar Tangai, Kamala, Kaghan, Musa-Tangai, Bangokas, Dandona, Koz Tangai and Sogiyar. Its population is approximately 32000 to 40000.

== Education ==
A number of primary schools, middle schools, a high school, and one girls higher secondary school are serving to provide education. The private schools and colleges like Al-Farooq and Shaheen are leading institutes followed by many private schools. An Islamic Madrasa contributing to Islamic education. Most male students, unfortunately, stop further education after completing their matriculation or higher secondary education, however, in recent year the healthy trend of higher education is sprouting. Although a lack of financial resources, educational and dedicated transport facilities to the nearest universities for the female population limits their education opportunities, their education rate is growing. There are number of educationist who are serving at top levels of the province. Prof Dr Haider Darain is one of them who is currently working as Dean Allied Health Sciences at Khyber Medical University, Peshawar. He is the youngest who achieved this position.

== Health ==
A basic health unit serves as the only public health facility available. The unit is equipped with a qualified doctor and related public health supporting staff. However, the facility fails to cope with the burden of patients and ailments requiring specialized care. The patients visit private doctors and medical stores for their healthcare needs. The nearest referral hospitals are district headquarter hospital Batkhela (10 km) and tahsil headquarter hospital Chakdara (17 km).

== Living ==
Majority of the people are associated with agriculture for their direct and indirect income. The area is rich in growing crops vegetables and crops like rice, wheat, maize, sugarcane and seasonal fruits. Other famous professions are teaching, businesses, freelancers skilled workers and public services covering almost all sectors of life from health to finance. The overseas job market is considered attractive for both highly educated skilled individuals as well as for unskilled masses and to date remains the major revenue source for the area. Major destinations for work are countries like Saudi Arabia, UAE, Oman, and other gulf countries etc. The people are very warm-hearted and hospitable. The society also participates in social events actively. The weddings are celebrated almost three days long with traditional dishes and sweets with a large number of attendees. Likewise, the death is mourned together with praying for the lost one. Eid is the biggest occasion of the year, twice after Ramadan and the day following the Hajj. People usually visit each other and share food and greetings to relatives, neighbors and the poor. There is no other notable fest or celebration around the year.

== Tourist attractions ==
The village is located seven kilometer from Swat highway and can be easily reached (Batkhela-Totakan road). The bank of the river with a long belt of picnic spots on both sides make it ideal for summer holidays trips and fish hunting. The Trai picnic spot attracts a large number of travelers with its cold clear water, green background hill and cool breeze. The sunset in the summer is lovely to see. Moreover, the Mayar village waterfalls are hidden but a must visit place for travelers who appreciate nature. Local restaurants and resorts offer fish and other traditional food. Travelers are always cautioned to avoid going to water and swimming particularly in summer when the current of water is high. Polluting the green belt with leftovers and floods remain challenges for its sustainability. Other attractive scenic views include Khadagzai river bridge and Kalama-Sugyaar Trai. Khadagzai has moderate to extreme temperatures about average 30 to 40 °C in summer. Monsoons follows the early dry heat in summer. The winter is usually dry and extremely cold.

== Sports and Cultural Activities ==
Cricket, like in other parts of Pakistan, is the main sport played by almost each age group. There are a number playing grounds in different locations of the village but street cricket is also common. Many good cricket teams are practicing each day and participate in the local tournaments. Besides cricket, volleyball, fishing, swimming, football, and hunting are popular. With the introduction of technology, motorbikes riding and video games took some share but still not popular. The villagers have good sens of appreciation for literary activities particularly poetry. Famous poet Sajid Afghan actively arrange activities like 'Mushairas' and Poetry slams. He initiated cultural meetup hub (Bandara) to revive the dying Hujra culture and help connect the Pashtoon cultural values to the youth. Beside him, the village has pride to have another prominent poet, Prof. Qasim Khan.
