= PK-16 Lower Dir-III =

Pakistani electoral district

- Constituency for the Khyber Pakhtunkhwa Assembly
- Region: Timergara Tehsil, Rabat UC of Balambat Tehsil and Khadagzai of Lower Dir District

Current constituency
- Party: Pakistan Tehreek-e-Insaf
- Member: Shafi Ullah
- Created from: PK-94 Lower Dir-I (2002–2018); PK-15 Lower Dir-III (2018–2023)

PK-16 Lower Dir-III (پی کے-16 دیر زیریں-3) is a constituency for the Khyber Pakhtunkhwa Assembly of the Khyber Pakhtunkhwa province of Pakistan.

== Elections 2013 ==
The following table shows the names of candidates, their parties and the votes they secured in the general elections held on May 11, 2013.

Contesting candidates	Party affiliation	Votes polled
Muzafar Said	Jamaat-e-Islami Pakistan	14456
Mehmood Zeb Khan	Pakistan Peoples Party Parliamentarians	9691
Muhammad Ayoub Khan	Awami National Party	7010
Muhammad Inam Khan	Pakistan Tehreek-e-Insaf	6977
Aayaz Ud Din	Jamiat Ulama-e-Islam (F)	1996
Farooq Iqbal Badshah	Pakistan Muslim League (N)	1074
Muhammad Nabi Shah	Independent	121
Bahadar Khan	Independent	71
Shah Khizar Khan	Independent	52
Habibullah	APML	44

== See also ==
- PK-15 Lower Dir-II
- PK-17 Lower Dir-IV
