= Salarzai Tehsil =

Pakistani administrative subdivision

Coordinates: 34.76552°N 71.57104°E

Salarzai Tehsil تحصیل سالارزئی سالارزي تحصیل
- Tehsil
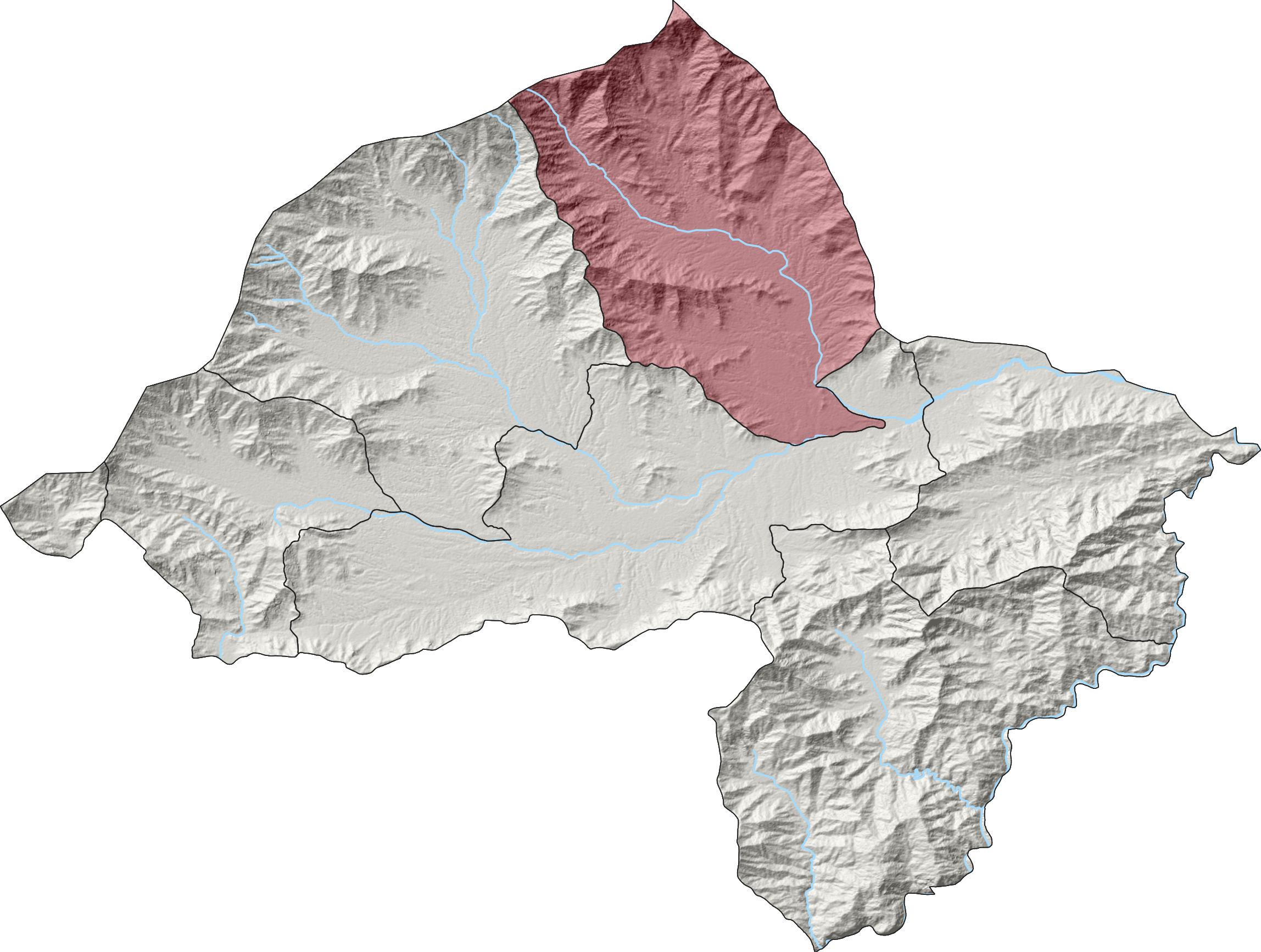
- Salarzai Tehsil (red) in Bajaur District
- Country: Pakistan
- Region: Khyber Pakhtunkhwa
- District: Bajaur District
- Headquarters: Pashat

Population (2017)
  - Total: 268,517
- Time zone: UTC+5 (PST)

Salarzai Tehsil (Pashto: تحصیل سالارزی) is an administrative subdivision (tehsil) of Bajaur District in Khyber Pakhtunkhwa Province, Pakistan. Salarzai is the third largest of Bajaur District's seven tehsils.

== Geography ==
Salarzai Tehsil, the third largest in Bajaur District, is 220 km^{2} in area and encompassing one valley and several smaller ravines draining from mountains along the border with Afghanistan. Representing the northernmost region of Bajaur District, Salarzai shares a 22.35 km border with Khar Bajaur Tehsil to the south, a 17.05 km border with Mamund Tehsil to the west, a 9.83 km border with Afghanistan's Dangam District, Kunar Province to the north, and a 21.53 km border with Lower Dir District's Samar Bagh Tehsil to the east.

== Demographics ==
=== Population ===
As of the 2017 Pakistani national census, Salarzai Tehsil has a population of 267,636 people, representing a +3.40% population increase from its 1998 census population of 141,750 compared to a +3.23% population growth in the overall Bajaur District. Residents of Salarzai comprise 24.53% of the Bajaur District population as of 2017.

=== Language ===
The vast majority of Salarzai residents expectedly speak Pashto as their mother tongue, the predominant language of ethnic Pakhtuns (Pashtuns) and of the derivatively-named Khyber Pakhtunkhwa Province (KPK). As of 2017, 99.45% of Salarzai residents recorded Pashto as their mother tongue with other residents recording Urdu (267), Brahui (278), Sindhi (137), Punjabi (77), Saraiki (70), Kashmiri (63), Balochi (49), Hindko (5), and 'other' (32) as mother tongues.

=== Religion ===
As of 2017, 99.99% of Salarzai Tehsil residents reported belonging to the Islamic faith along with 31 residents recorded as Ahmadi, 2 belonging to caste systems, and 1 listed as 'other'.

=== Politics ===
Salarzai Tehsil is politically represented in the National Assembly of Pakistan (the lower house of the national parliament) in the NA-8 Bajaur constituency and in the Provincial Assembly of Khyber Pakhtunkhwa in the PK-20 Bajaur-II constituency. In both bodies, Salarzai Tehsil (as well as Bajaur District and most of KPK) historically elects candidates from the Pakistan Tehreek-e-Insaf (PTI) party established by Pakistani cricketer and 22nd Prime Minister, Imran Khan, who is seen as a fierce advocate for the nation's Pakhtuns, many of whom feel disenfranchised by Islamabad.

== See also ==
- Mamund Tehsil
- Khar Bajaur Tehsil
- Nawagai Tehsil
- Utman Khel Tehsil
- Barang Tehsil
- Bar Charmer Kand Tehsil
- Bajaur District
- Khyber Pakhtunkhwa Province
