= Mamund Tehsil =

Pakistani administrative subdivision

Coordinates: 34.7948°N 71.4112°E

Mamund Tehsil تحصیل ماموند ماموند تحصیل
- Tehsil
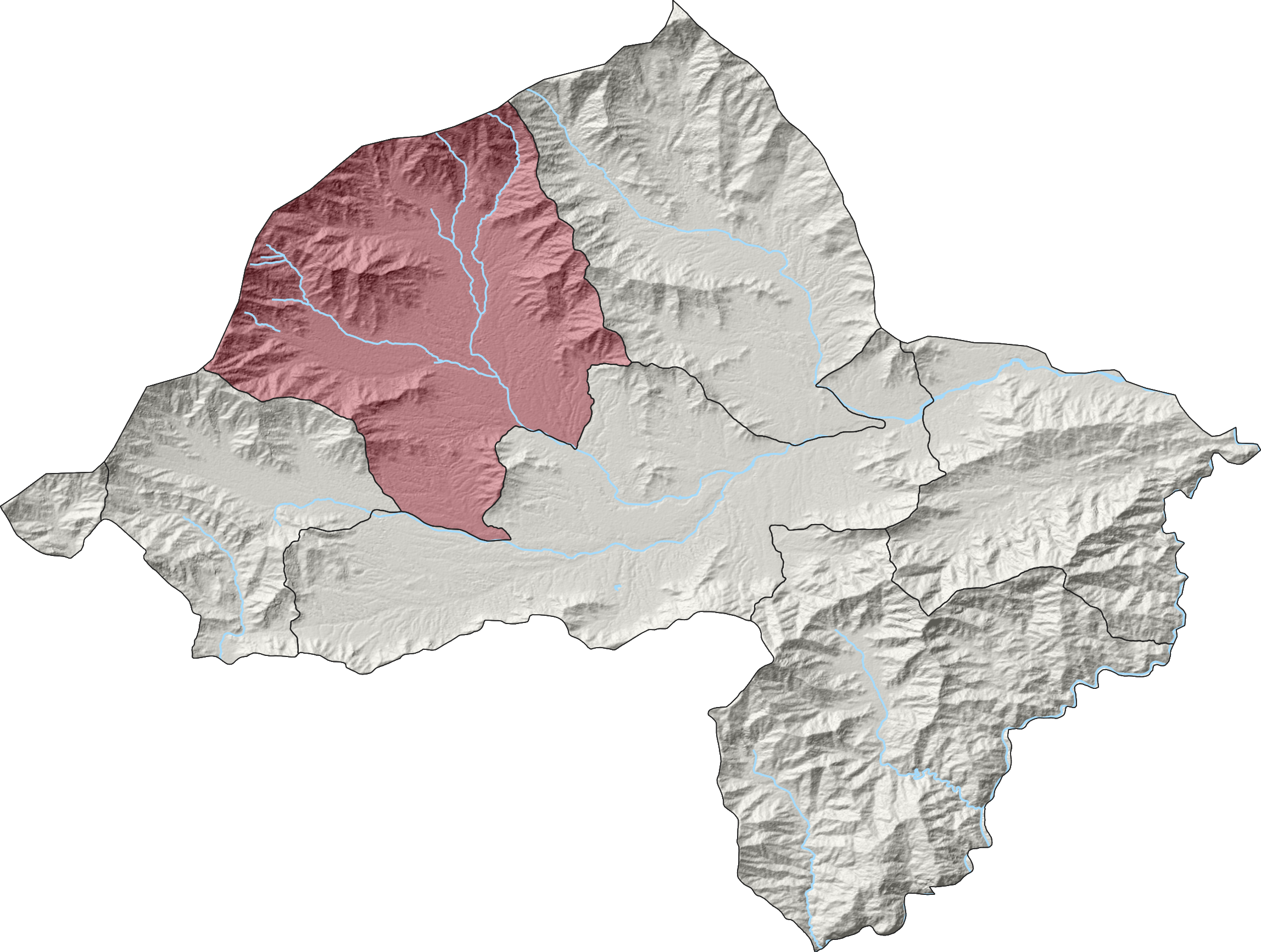
- Mamund Tehsil (red) in Bajaur District
- Country: Pakistan
- Region: Khyber Pakhtunkhwa
- District: Bajaur District
- Established: 1960

Population (2017)
  - Total: 311,873
- Time zone: UTC+5 (PST)

Mamund Tehsil (Pashto: تحصیل ماموند) is an administrative subdivision (tehsil) of Bajaur District in Khyber Pakhtunkhwa Province, Pakistan. Mamund is the largest of Bajaur District's seven tehsils.

== History ==
Bajaur was declared as a subdivision of the former Malakand Agency in 1960, and Mamund was established as a tehsil within the Bajaur subdivision. Bajaur was declared a Federally Administered Tribal Agency in December 1973. Mamund Tehsil joined Khyber Pakhtunkhwa on 31 May 2018 with the merger of the Federally Administered Tribal Areas. It was previously a tehsil before the FATA Interim Governance Regulation, 2018 was signed by President Mamnoon Hussain. With FATA's merger to Khyber Pakhtunkhwa, its status was upgraded to a tehsil.

== Geography ==
Mamund Tehsil, the largest in Bajaur District, is 250 km^{2} in area and encompasses two mountain valleys, a small basin, and the junction of the three. Representing Bajaur District's north-central region, Mamund shares a 16.55 km border with Salarzai Tehsil to the east, a 23.27 km border with Khar Bajaur Tehsil to the south, a 13.06 km border with Nawagai Tehsil to the southwest, a 9.33 km border with Afghanistan's Shaigal District, Kunar Province to the northwest, and 12.97 km border with Afghanistan's Marawara District, Kunar Province to the north.

== Demographics ==
Historical population
| Year | Pop. | ±% p.a. |
|---|---|---|
| 1981 | 83,102 | — |
| 1998 | 168,283 | +4.24% |
| 2017 | 311,873 | +3.30% |

=== Population ===
As of the 2017 Pakistani national census, Mamund Tehsil has a population of 311,873 people and 35,269 households, representing a +3.29% population increase from its 1998 census population of 168,283 compared to a +3.23% population growth in the overall Bajaur District. Residents of Mamund comprise 28.54% of the Bajaur District population as of 2017.

=== Language ===
The vast majority of Mamund residents expectedly speak Pashto as their mother tongue, the predominant language of ethnic Pakhtuns (Pashtuns) and of the derivatively-named Khyber Pakhtunkhwa Province (KPK). As of 2017, 98.92% of Mamund residents recorded Pashto as their mother tongue with other residents recording Urdu (1,278), Brahui (510), Sindhi (356), Saraiki (166), Balochi (158), Kashmiri (157), Punjabi (116), Hindko (6), and 'others' (110) as mother tongues.

=== Religion ===
As of 2017, 99.98% of Mamund Tehsil residents reported belonging to the Islamic faith along with 165 recorded Christians, 149 Ahmadi, 15 belonging to caste systems, 1 Hindu, and 18 'other'.

=== Politics ===
Mamund Tehsil is politically represented in the National Assembly of Pakistan (the lower house of the national parliament) in the NA-8 Bajaur constituency and in the Provincial Assembly of Khyber Pakhtunkhwa in the PK-19 Bajaur-I and PK-20 Bajaur-II constituencies. In both bodies, Mamund Tehsil (as well as Bajaur District and most of KPK) historically elects candidates from the Pakistan Tehreek-e-Insaf (PTI) party established by Pakistani cricketer and 22nd Prime Minister, Imran Khan, who is seen as a fierce advocate for the nation's Pakhtuns, many of whom feel disenfranchised by Islamabad.

== See also ==
- Khar Bajaur Tehsil
- Salarzai Tehsil
- Nawagai Tehsil
- Utman Khel Tehsil
- Barang Tehsil
- Bar Charmer Kand Tehsil
- Bajaur District
- Khyber Pakhtunkhwa Province
