= NA-8 Bajaur =

Constituency of the National Assembly of Pakistan

- Constituency for the National Assembly of Pakistan
- Region: Bajaur District
- Electorate: 237,153

Current constituency
- Party: Awami National Party
- Member: Mubarak Zeb Khan
- Created from: NA-40 (Tribal Area-I), NA-41 (Tribal Area-II), NA-42 (Tribal Area-III)

NA-8 Bajaur (این اے-8، باجوڑ) is a constituency for the National Assembly of Pakistan consisting of the whole Bajaur District.

== Members of Parliament ==
=== 2002–2018: NA-44 Tribal Area-IX ===
Election	Member	Party
2002	Haroon Rashid	Independent
2008	Akhunzada Chattan	Independent
2013	Shahab Ud Din Khan	PML-N

=== 2018–2022: NA-41 Tribal Area-II ===
Election	Member	Party
2018	Gul Zafar Khan	PTI

== By-election 2024 ==
A by-election was held on 21 April 2024 due to the postponement of general elections in this constituency. Mubarak Zeb Khan won the election with 74,008 votes.

2024 Pakistani by-elections: NA-8 Bajaur
Party	Candidate	Votes	%	±%
Independent	Mubarak Zeb Khan	74,008	40.60	▲40.60
SIC	Gul Zafar Khan	47,282	25.94	▲0.23
Independent	Shaukatullah Khan	20,020	10.98	▲10.98
JI	Sahibzada Haroon Ul Rasheed	18,416	10.10	▼2.81
ANP	Maulana Khan Zeb	12,015	6.59	▲1.20
PML(N)	Shahab Uddin Khan	6,469	3.56	▲3.56
PPP	Akhunzada Chattan	4,060	2.23	▼3.31
Turnout		187,301	28.04	▼10.13
Total valid votes		182,270	97.31	▼0.40
Rejected ballots		5,031	2.69	▲0.40
Majority		26,726	14.66	▲5.69
Registered electors		667,983		
Independent gain from PTI				

== Election 2024 ==
Elections were scheduled to be held on 8 February 2024 but postponed due to assassination of independent candidate Rehan Zeb Khan.

== Election 2018 ==
General elections were held on 25 July 2018.

General election 2018: NA-41 (Tribal Area-II)
Party	Candidate	Votes	%	±%
PTI	Gul Zafar Khan	22,730	25.70	
Independent	Abdul Majeed	14,792	16.73	
MMA	Abdur Rasheed	11,415	12.91	
Independent	Muhammad Ayaz	11,234	12.70	
Independent	Shahab Uddin Khan	8,768	9.91	
Independent	Sultan Zeb Khan	8,387	9.48	
ANP	Gul Zada Khan	4,765	5.39	
PPP	Akhunzada Chattan	4,016	4.54	
Others	Others (four candidates)	2,332	2.64	
Turnout		90,512	38.17	
Total valid votes		88,439	97.71	
Rejected ballots		2,073	2.29	
Majority		7,938	8.97	
Registered electors		237,153		
PTI gain from PML(N)				

== Election 2013 ==
General elections were held on 11 May 2013. Shahab Ud Din Khan of PML-N won by 15,114 votes and became the member of National Assembly.

== Election 2008 ==
The result of general election 2008 in this constituency is given below.

=== Result ===
Akhunzada Chattan succeeded in the election 2008 and became the member of National Assembly.

General Election 2008: Tribal Area-IX
Party	Candidate	Votes	%
Independent	Akhunzada Chattan	6,257	29
Independent	Shahab Uddin Khan	5,203	24
Independent	Gul Dad Khan	4,648	22
Others	Others	7,113	25

== Election 2002 ==
General elections were held on 10 October 2002. Haroon Rashid an independent candidate won by 13,389 votes.

== See also ==
- NA-7 Lower Dir-II
- NA-9 Malakand
