= 2017 Pakistani census =

2017 national census of Pakistan

2017 Census of Pakistan
- 15 March 2017 to 25 May 2017

General information
- Country: Pakistan
- Topics: Census topics: People and population; Families and living arrangements; Language; Religion; Housing
- Authority: Pakistan Bureau of Statistics
- Website: www.pbs.gov.pk

Results
- Total population: 213,222,917 (▲56.5%)
- Most populous province: Punjab (109,989,655)
- Least populous province: Gilgit-Baltistan (1,492,924)

The 2017 Census of Pakistan was a detailed enumeration of the Pakistani population which began on 15 March 2017 and ended on 25 May 2017. It was the first census taken in the country in the 21st century, nineteen years after the previous one in 1998, and it was carried out by the Pakistan Bureau of Statistics.

The census recorded a total population throughout the country of 213,222,917. (Note: The population of the four provinces and the Islamabad Capital Territory being 207,684,626, the population of Azad Jammu & Kashmir being 4,045,367, and the population of Gilgit-Baltistan being 1,492,924.) The results showed a massive population increase having occurred between 1998 and 2017 of 77.0 million people, or an increase of +56.5%. (Note: In 1998, the population of the four provinces and Islamabad Capital Territory being 132,352,279, the population of Azad Jammu & Kashmir being 2,972,501, and the population of Gilgit-Baltistan being 884,000. This is a total of 136,208,780.) The results also marked a significantly higher result compared to estimations made of the Pakistani population before the census, which had previously estimated the Pakistani population in 2017 to be between 195 million and 200 million.

Controversies regarding this census, focused around the populations of Pakistan's largest city, Karachi and the province of Sindh, resulted in another census being scheduled early in the year 2023. The results of that census will be used to delimitate constituencies for the 2023 Pakistani general election.

== Design ==
Distribution of the phases of the Census

The 2017 Census of Pakistan was conducted by over 110,000 civilian staff along with security provided by over 200,000 personnel from the Pakistan Army. Its budget was 18.5 Billion Pakistani Rupees, of which 6.0 Billion went to the armed forces, 6.5 billion was assigned for transportation and other related expenses, and 6.0 Billion was spent on training and re-enumeration. Many questions were asked of each individual, most importantly: age, sex, marital status, religion, mother tongue, nationality, educational attainment, literacy, and employment status. Data was also collected regarding every single household in the country, such as the tenure, the building material, the year of construction, the source of water, and the source of light.

It also was conducted in 2 phases. The first phase lasted from 15 March 2017 to 13 April 2017 and covered 53 districts of the country. The second phase began on 25 April 2017 and lasted until 24 May 2017 covering the remaining 88 districts. However, the census in the Islamabad Capital Territory and neighbouring districts of Attock and Rawalpindi, although included in the second phase, began on 30 March 2017 and concluded on 23 May 2017. Furthermore, for administrative purposes, the census in the Kech District of Balochistan was spread over both phases. In certain, "snowbound" areas of Khyber Pakhtunkhwa, the enumeration took place in June 2017.

== Results ==
Population of each Pakistani District as of the 2017 Pakistan Census

Population Density per square kilometre of each Pakistani District as of the 2017 Pakistan Census

Average Annual Population Growth Rate in each Pakistani District between 1998 and 2017 according to the Pakistan Bureau of Statistics

Median Age of each Pakistani District as of the 2017 Pakistan Census

Literacy Rate in each Pakistani District as of the 2017 Pakistan Census

Sex Ratio of each Pakistani District as of the 2017 Pakistan Census

While basic provisional results of the 2017 Census of Pakistan were released in late 2017 and early 2018, the final results of the census were publicly released throughout the spring and summer of 2021, and they showed that in 2017, Pakistan had 213.2 Million residents. Data for Azad Kashmir and Gilgit-Baltistan was disseminated separately by the territories' own statistical agencies.

Administrative Unit	Population (1998)	Population (2017)	Percent Growth	Annualized Growth
Khyber Pakthunkhwa	17,743,645	30,508,920	▲71.9%	▲2.89%
FATA (Note: Now defunct, having been merged into the province of Khyber Pakhtunkhwa)	3,176,331	4,993,044	▲57.2%	▲2.40%
Punjab	73,621,290	109,989,655	▲49.4%	▲2.13%
Sindh	30,439,893	47,854,510	▲57.2%	▲2.41%
Balochistan	6,565,855	12,335,129	▲87.9%	▲3.37%
ICT	805,235	2,003,368	▲148.8%	▲4.90%
Azad Kashmir	2,972,501	4,045,367	▲36.1%	▲1.63%
Gilgit-Baltistan	884,000	1,492,924	▲68.9%	▲2.79%
Four provinces and ICT	132,352,279	207,684,626	▲56.9%	▲2.40%
Total Pakistan	136,208,780	213,222,917	▲56.5%	▲2.38%

Population By Gender
Population	Total	207,684,626
Population	Males	106,018,220
Population	Females	101,344,632
Population	Transgender	21,744

Raw data

=== City ===
The population of 10 major cities of the country has increased by 74.4 percent since 1998, when the last census was conducted, according to the data of recently concluded 6th Population and Housing Census 2017.

The total population of the 10 cities surged to 40,956,232 individuals as per the 2017 census from 23,475,067 registered during the 1998 census, the data revealed.

Rank	City	Population (2017 census)	Population (1998 census)	Change of Growth	Province
1	Karachi	16,051,521	9,856,318	62.86%	Sindh
2	Lahore	11,126,285	5,143,495	116.32%	Punjab
3	Faisalabad	3,203,846	2,008,861	59.49%	Punjab
4	Rawalpindi	2,098,231	1,409,768	48.84%	Punjab
5	Gujranwala	2,027,001	1,132,509	78.98%	Punjab
6	Peshawar	1,970,042	982,816	100.45%	Khyber-Pakhtunkhwa
7	Multan	1,871,843	1,197,384	56.33%	Punjab
8	Hyderabad	1,732,693	1,166,894	48.49%	Sindh
9	Islamabad	1,014,825	529,180	91.77%	Islamabad Capital Territory
10	Quetta	1,001,205	565,137	77.16%	Balochistan

=== Population Pyramids ===
Population Pyramids of each Pakistani province and nationwide as of the 2017 Pakistan Census.

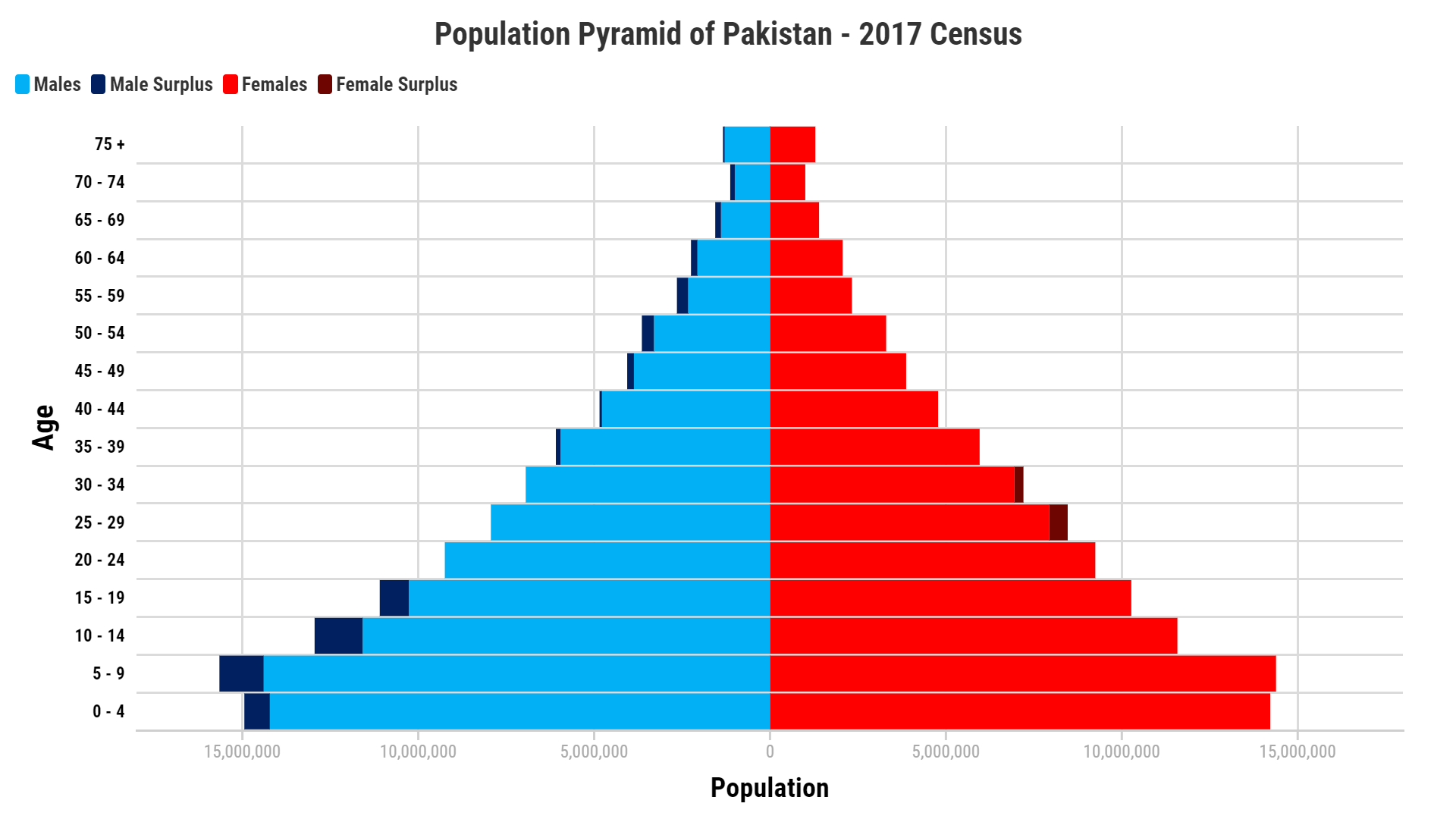
Nationwide Population Pyramid

Population Pyramids by Pakistani province
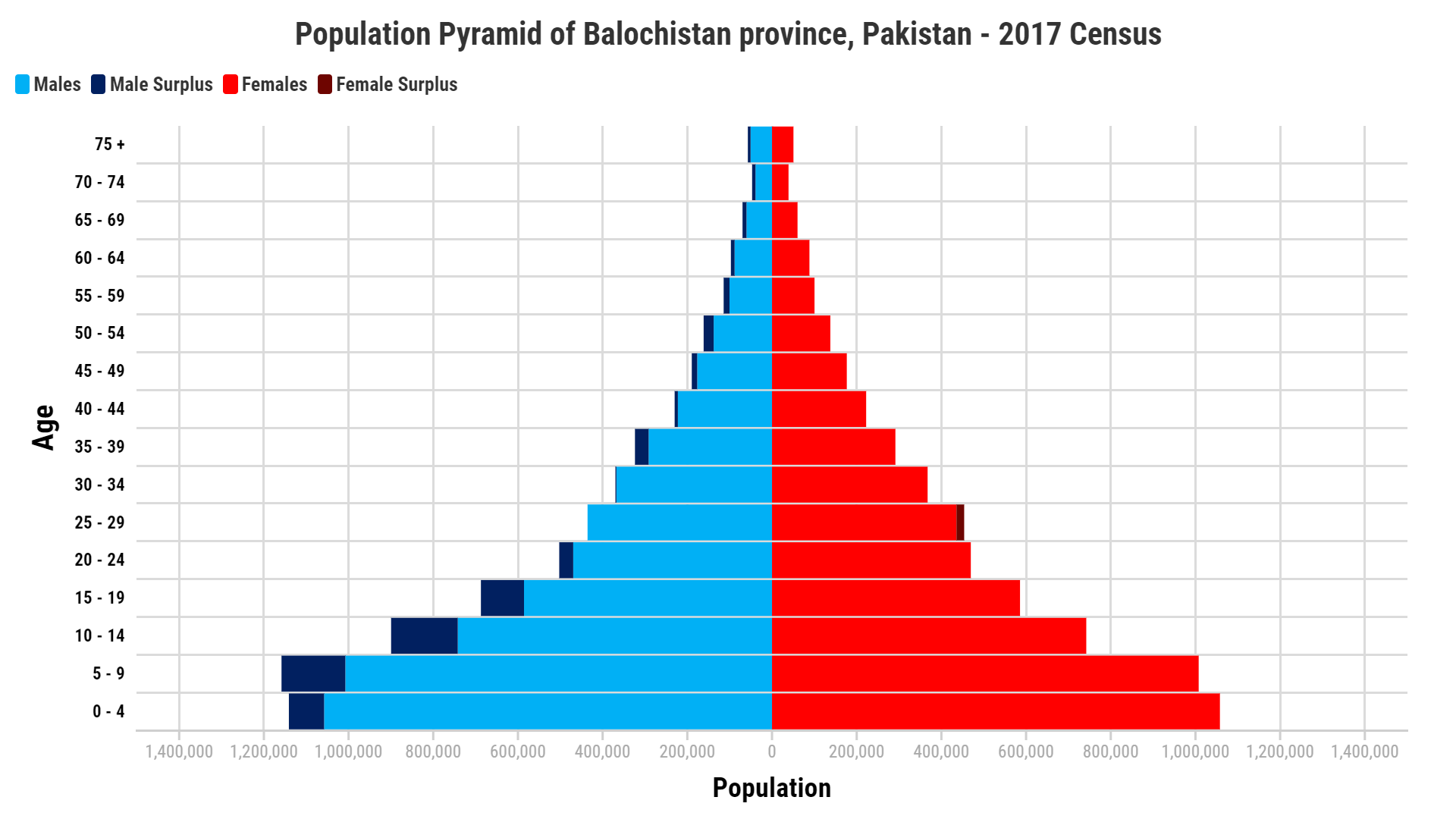
Balochistan, Pakistan

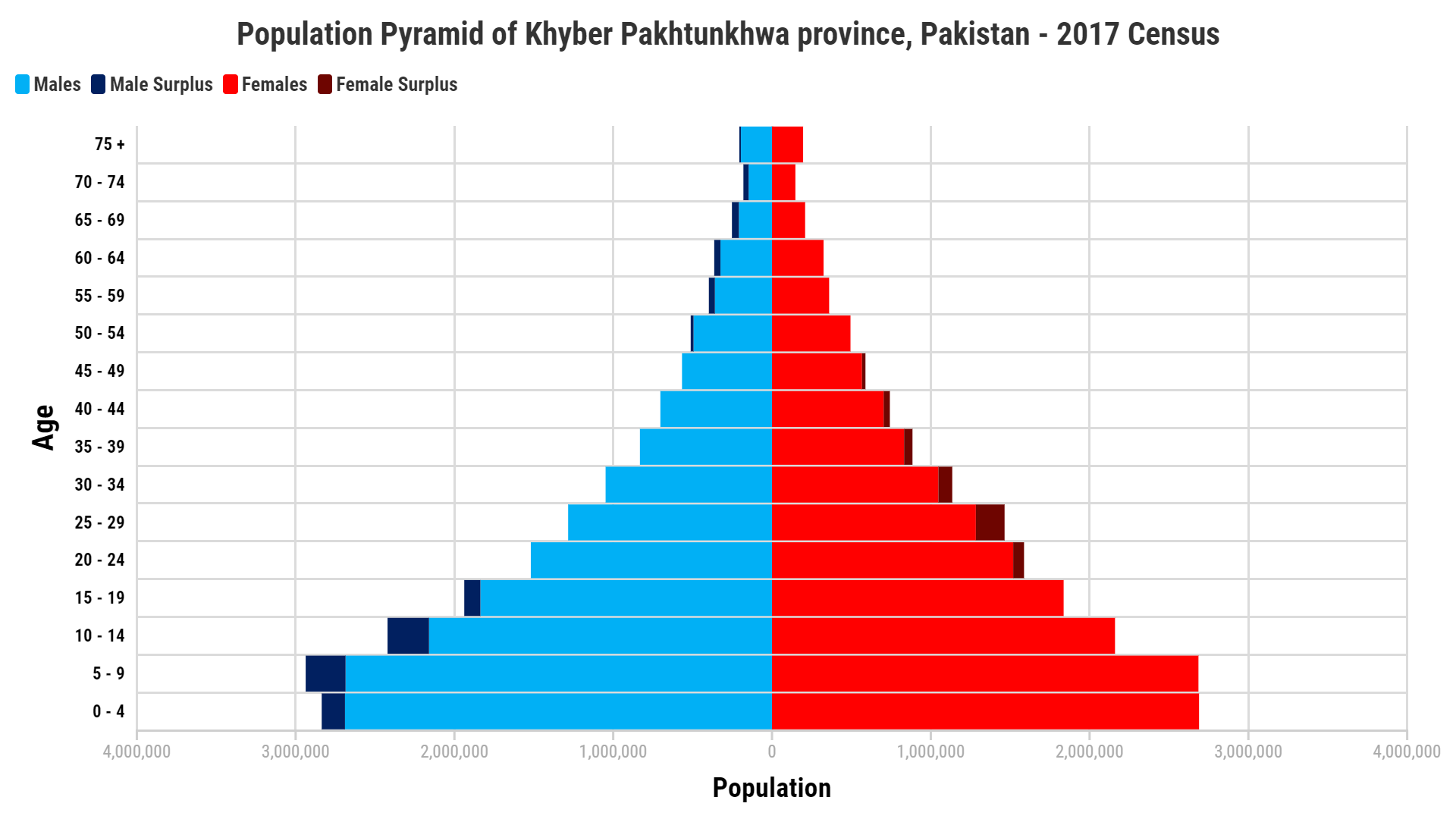
Khyber Pakhtunkhwa

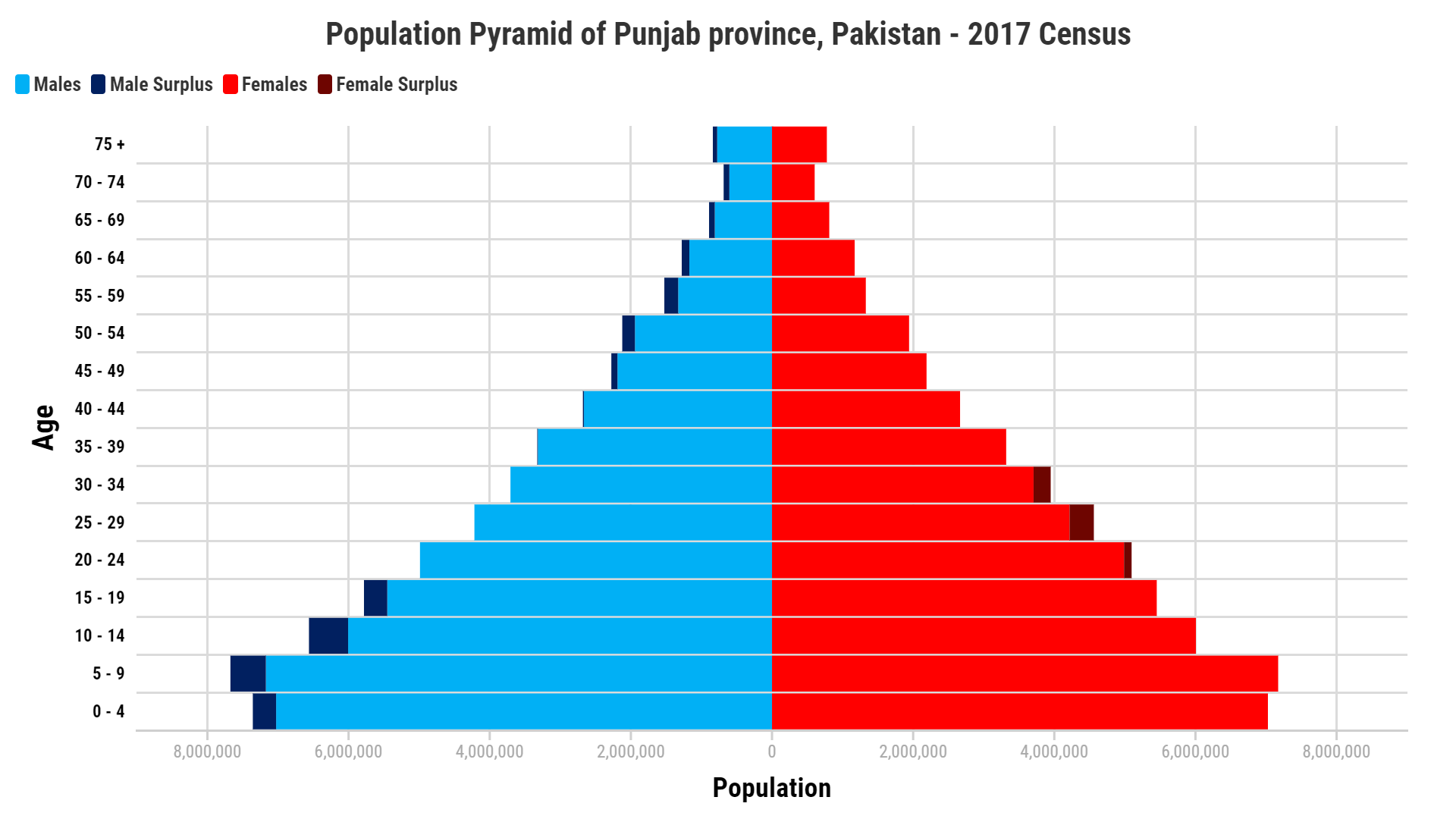
Punjab, Pakistan

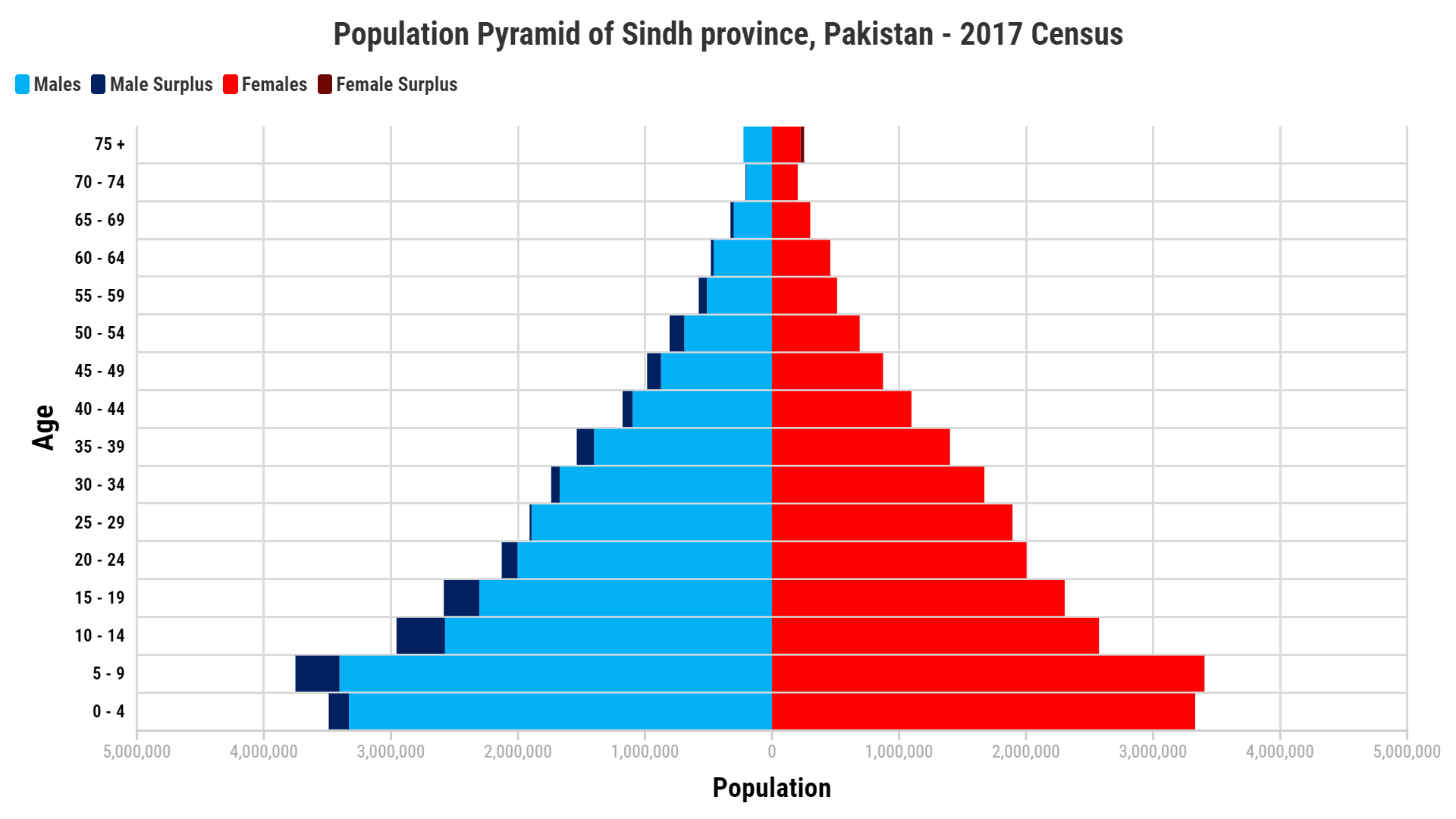
Sindh, Pakistan

== Controversies ==
=== Sindh population ===
The Sindh Assembly refused to accept the results of the 2017 census, stating that millions of people were shown with double addresses and counted in their home provinces despite living and working in Sindh. In April 2018, Mustafa Kamal, chairman of the Pak Sarzameen Party and former Mayor of Karachi, challenged the results of the 2017 census in the Supreme Court, seeking a third-party audit of the national census. Kamal pleaded that records from the National Database and Registration Authority (NADRA) showed the population of Karachi to be 20.15 million, rather than 16 million as shown in the census.

=== FATA population ===
Shahab Uddin Khan, a Member of the National Assembly (MNA) from Bajaur Agency, has stated he believes that a large number of people displaced from the Mamund and Nawagai regions due to security operations have not been counted by the census. He has stated he intends to challenge the census in court. Bismillah Khan, an MNA from Bajaur Agency, has stated he believes the population of the Federally Administered Tribal Areas is double of what is reflected in the census. He added that he will take up the issue with the federal government along with other lawmakers. Sajid Hussain Turi, an MNA from Khyber Agency, claimed that more than three million people from FATA are living in other cities in the country due to military operations, and expressed concern that developmental work in the region could be underfunded if the population is underestimated by the census.

=== Political opposition ===
Syed Khurshid Ahmed Shah of the Pakistan Peoples Party (PPP), Former Leader of the Opposition in the National Assembly, questioned the provisional census results. He issued a statement demanding that data collected by the statistics division should be compared to data from the Pakistan Army. PPP leader Nawab Muhammad Yousuf accused authorities of doctoring the results, alleging that the population of Sindh had been intentionally underestimated by at least 10 million and the population of Punjab had been overestimated by 10 million. He described the results as an attempt to usurp the rights of Sindh. PPP Senator Mukhtiar Ahmed Dhamrah disputed the population of Karachi and Lahore reported in the preliminary results.

Bushra Gohar, leader of Awami National Party (ANP), pointed out in a tweet that the reported population of around 5 million for the Federally Administered Tribal Areas seems contradictory to the fact that there have been nearly 2 million internally displaced persons registered from North Waziristan alone.

Chief Census Commissioner Asif Bajwa rejected allegations that the census results had been manipulated and that the population of Karachi had been intentionally understated. He stated that the populations of Karachi and Lahore were counted as per the record of national identity cards and voter lists and that the census data had already been verified with statistics recorded by the army.

== Religious demographics ==
Religion in Pakistan (2017 Official Census)
1. Islam (96.5%)
2. Hinduism (2.14%)
3. Christianity (1.27%)
4. Ahmadiyya (0.10%)
5. Other Religions (0.02%)

Pakistan Bureau of Statistics released religious data of Pakistan Census 2017 on 19 May 2021. 96.47% are Muslims, followed by 2.14% Hindus, 1.27% Christians, 0.09% Ahmadis and 0.02% others.

These are some maps of religious minority groups. The 2017 census showed an increasing share in Hinduism, mainly caused by a higher birth rate among the impoverished Hindus of Sindh province. This census also recorded Pakistan's first Hindu-majority district, called Umerkot District, where Muslims were previously the majority.

On the other hand, Christianity in Pakistan, while increasing in raw numbers, has fallen significantly in percentage terms since the last census. This is due to Pakistani Christians having a significantly lower fertility rate than Pakistani Muslims and Pakistani Hindus as well as them being concentrated in the most developed parts of Pakistan, Lahore District (over 5% Christian), Islamabad Capital Territory (over 4% Christian), and Northern Punjab.

The Ahmadiyya movement shrunk in size (both raw numbers and percentage) between 1998 and 2017, while remaining concentrated in Lalian Tehsil, Chiniot District, where approximately 13% of the population is Ahmadiyya.

Here are some maps of Pakistan's religious minority groups as of the 2017 census by district:

Hindu Proportion of each Pakistani District in 2017 as of the 2017 Pakistan Census

Christian Proportion of each Pakistani District as of the 2017 Pakistan Census

Ahmadiyya Proportion of each Pakistani District as of the 2017 Pakistan Census

Virtually all people not belonging to one of these minority groups were Sunni or Shia Muslim, with the most religiously homogeneous areas found in Khyber Pakhtunkhwa.

== Language demographics ==
Languages of Pakistan (2017)
1. Punjabi (38.8%)
2. Pashto (18.2%)
3. Sindhi (14.6%)
4. Saraiki (12.2%)
5. Urdu (7.08%)
6. Balochi (3.02%)
7. Hindko (2.24%)
8. Brahui (1.24%)
9. Others (2.65%)

Pakistan Bureau of Statistics released language data of Pakistan Census 2017 on 19 May 2021. 7.08% of the Pakistani people mentioned Urdu as their mother language, 38.78% Punjabi, 14.57% Sindhi, 18.24% Pashto, 3.02% Balochi, 0.17% Kashmiri, 12.19% Saraiki, 2.44% Hindko, 1.24% Brahui and 2.26% others.

== Security incidents ==
- (Khyber Pakhtunkhwa) 21 March 2017 – a census team came under attack from villagers in the Gandheri area of Nowshera. The aggressors were apprehended and their arms were confiscated.
- (Khyber Pakhtunkhwa) 25 March 2017 – a policeman deputed on census team's security in Charsadda was injured when he was fired at by an attacker. In retaliatory fire, the attacker was injured and arrested.
- (Punjab, Pakistan) 5 April 2017 – a census team was targeted in a suicide attack on Lahore's Bedian Road. 7 members of the team were slain – including two enumerators and 5 army personnel on security and reconnaissance duty.
- (Balochistan, Pakistan) 25 April 2017 – a Levies personnel providing security to the census team was killed while another was injured as they came under attack from gunmen in Kallag Kollanch area of Gwadar. The Balochistan Liberation Front claimed responsibility for the attack.
- (Federally Administered Tribal Areas) 26 April 2017 – a passenger van carrying civilians and a census team hit a land-mine in Kurram Agency. 14 civilians were killed while 9 people were injured, among them 2 census workers and 4 Khasadar officials.
- (Balochistan, Pakistan) 5 May 2017 – a census team performing its duties in villages in Chaman near the Afghan-Pakistan border was unilaterally attacked by Afghan forces. Two security personnel with the team were killed along with 10 civilians.

== See also ==
- Census in Pakistan
- Demographics of Pakistan
