= Malak Ahmad Khan Yusufzai =

Pashtun Yusufzai chieftain (1460–1530)

Malik Ahmad Khan Yusufzai

Yusufzai Chieftain
- Reign: 1520–1530
- Predecessor: Malak Suleiman Shah Yusufzai
- Successor: Malak Gaju Khan Yusufzai
- Born: 1460; Kabulistan, Timurid Empire (in present-day Kabul, Kabul Province, Afghanistan)
- Died: 1530 (aged 70); Malakand (in present-day Malakand District, Khyber Pakhtunkhwa, Pakistan)
- Father: Malak Sultan Shah

Malak Ahmad Khan Mandar (1460–1530), also known as Malik Ahmad Baba, was a Pashtun chief and warrior from the Malakzai Razar-Mandanr tribe. He was Chief of Yousafzai tribe but he himself was Mandar. He is known for leading the Yusufzai conquest of Swat, Malakand and Lower Dir. Under his leadership, the Yusufzai fought the Dilazaks and Sultan Awais Gabri Swati for control of northern territories in the Khyber Pakhtoon Khwa.

== Early life ==
Malak Ahmad Khan Yusufzai was born circa 1460 in the Kabul region (then part of the Timurid Empire). He was the son of Malak Sultan Shah, a tribal elder of the Razar-Malakzai branch.

In 1474, when he was about 14 years old, Mirza Ulugh Beg, the Timurid ruler of Kabul, invited around 700 Yusufzai elders to a banquet and massacred them to curb the tribe's growing power. Malak Ahmad survived because his uncle Malak Suleiman Shah offered his own life in exchange. The massacre forced the surviving Yusufzai to flee eastward into the Peshawar valley.

== Rise to leadership ==
After the massacre, Malak Ahmad emerged as the de facto leader of the Yusufzai remnants. He led them to settle first in the Doaba area of the Peshawar valley, where the Dilazaks initially gave them refuge. Conflicts soon arose, and the Yusufzai under Malak Ahmad eventually expelled the Dilazaks.

He succeeded his uncle Malak Suleiman Shah as chief and forged alliances with other Yusufzai clans. With the help of advisors such as Sheikh Mali, he convened jirgas to unify the tribe and plan territorial expansion.

== Conquests ==
Malak Ahmad led the Yusufzai in the conquest of Swat, Malakand, and Lower Dir, establishing headquarters at Thana in Malakand and founding a new Pashtun tribal polity.

=== Battles ===
- Yusufzai–Dilazak War (c. 1500–1520) — Prolonged conflict ending in the decisive expulsion of the Dilazaks eastward across the Indus River.It is believed by many pashtuns that the reson behind the battle between Yusufzai and Dilazak is due to one boy of Dilazak. He took the scarp of Yusufzai girl, Ahmad khan demanded the Dilazak that the boy should be given to him but the Dilazak denied his request leading to conflict between them.
- Battle of the Dir Valley (1523) — Key victory over the Dilazaks that secured Lower Dir.
- Conquest of Swat (c. 1520) — Surprise attack on the forces of Sultan Awais Jahangiri Swati, following the marriage alliance with Malak Ahmad's sister Shahida Bibi.

The Yusufzai also secured control over Buner, Swabi, and Mardan through these campaigns.

== Governance and legacy ==
Malak Ahmad, assisted by his advisor Sheikh Mali, oversaw the systematic division of the conquered lands among the Yusufzai clans using the traditional wesh (rotational allotment) system. This mechanism promoted equitable distribution of resources, prevented any single group from gaining permanent dominance over fertile lands, consolidated his authority, and rewarded the clans that had supported the conquests.

He is credited with uniting the Yusufzai under strong central leadership and establishing a powerful Pashtun tribal polity centered at Thana in Malakand. This laid the enduring foundations of Yusufzai dominance across Swat, Buner, Malakand, Dir, and the Peshawar valley region — an achievement for which he is locally revered as the founder of Pakhtunkhwa.

His descendants and the affiliated Malakzai families of the Razar-Mandanr branch — including Ahmed Khel, Aladad Khel, Juna Khel, Bashi Khel, Sultan Khel, Khadu Khel, Hamza Khel, Baba Khel, Bahram Khel, and Mir Khel — reside primarily in Yar Hussain village and surrounding areas such as Dagai, Adina, Shera Ghund, Nawan Kali, Turlandi, and Mir Khel (Tarakai). They are also found across Buner, Upper and Lower Dir, Swat, and Shangla; in Quetta, Loralai, and Pishin; in Kabul and Laghman Province of Afghanistan; in parts of Hazara, Mailsi, Multan, and Karachi in Pakistan; and in Bhopal, Lucknow, Delhi, and Pathankot in India.

== Early life ==
Ahmad Khan was born in or around 1460 to the Mandanr Yusufzai tribe of Pashtuns. He was the son of Malak Sultan Shah and the grandson of Malak Tajudeen. The Yusufzai migrated from Kandahar, Afghanistan to Kabul when Ulugh Beg was governor. He succeeded his father Shah Rukh, who was the son of Timur, in 1447 A.D. The Yusufzai settled outside Kabul and were one of the most influential Pashtuns. When Ulugh Beg II came to power, the Yusufzai lent him their support. Ulugh Beg II was the son-in-law of Malak Suleiman Shah. Ulugh Beg II initially favored them. Over time problems arose between the Yusufzai and the Timurids and the Yusufzai defeated them in a battle. It is also said that the Yusufzai viewed the Timurids as foreigners and wanted to unite all Afghans under ethnic Afghan rule. Orientalist Annette Beveridge recorded the following regarding Ulugh Beg and the head of the Yusufzai, Malik Sulaiman: "One day a wise man of the tribe, Shaikh Usman saw Sulaiman sitting with the young Mirza (Ulugh Beg) on his knee and warned him that the boy had the eyes of Yazid I and would destroy him and his family as Yazid had destroyed that of Prophet Muhammad. Sulaiman paid him no attention and gave the Mirza his daughter in marriage. Subsequently, the Mirza, having invited the Yusufzai to Kabul, treacherously killed Sulaiman and 700 of his followers. They were killed at the place called Siyah-sang near Kabul; it is still known as the Grave of the Martyrs. Their tombs are revered and that of Shaikh Usman in particular."

Malak Suleiman Shah made three requests of Ulugh Beg, the third was that Ahmad Khan's life should be spared, this was the only request granted. The massacre took place in 1484; Ulugh Beg sensed that the Yusufzai were now too powerful to be defeated in the field after defeat in the battle of Ghwarah Margha. He invited the Yusufzai inside Kabul on the pretext of a peace treaty. He arranged a big feast and asked them to hand over their weapons at the gate. With the help of the Gigyani (Khakai/Khashi branch), 701 of Yusufzai chiefs including Malak Suleiman were massacred. The only one spared was Malak Ahmad Khan. Malak Ahmad Khan led the Yusufzai to the east settling in Dilzak lands. He married the sister of the Malak of Dilazks the Malak of Dilzaks later killed this sister for unknown reasons.

== Family background ==
Malak Ahmad Khan was the son of Malak Sultan Shah, the chief of the Yusufzai and son of Malak Tajudeen, the son of Malak Tajudeen, the son of Malak Qasim.
