= 1976 Dir rebellion =

Date	3 September 1976 – 10 September 1976
Location	Dir state
Result	Pakistani victory: Suppression of rebellion

Belligerents
Pakistan (Khyber Pakhtunkhwa) Dir Levies	Dir rebels

Commanders and leaders
(Pakistan) Z.A Bhutto	Unknown

Units involved
Pakistan Army: XI Corps; Armoured corps; Artillery regiment; Engineer corps; Pakistan Air Force (Khyber Pakhtunkhwa) Dir Levies	Sultan Khel; Paidan Khel

Strength
~10,000	~2,000

Casualties and losses
~300 killed	~180 killed

1976 Dir revolt refers to a rebellion by Youafzai tribesmen against the government of Pakistan from 3 September to 10 September 1976. The rebellion was suppressed and stabilised government control over the area.

== Background ==
Dir was a Princely state under the British suzerainty and after the Partition of India, it became part of Pakistan. Its autonomy was reduced in 1955 and after a coup by Pakistani special forces in 1960, the area came under de facto Pakistani control. In 1969, the state of dir was officially abolished and it was fully incorporated into Pakistan. Zulfiqar Ali Bhutto started a land reform project in which large sections of timber forest was confiscated. It was a vital source of income for the locals and they stated protesting against the reform.

== Rebellion ==
The rebellion initially started as a protest by the local tribesmen in the Shongan valley south of Dir. In an effort to disperse the protesters, Dir Levies started firing tear gas shells on the protesters. Upon hearing the sound of shelling, multiple tribesmen including Suktankhel and Paidankhel tribesmen carrying melee weapons from the surrounding areas also entered the battlefield and started attacking the troops of Dir Levies. The situation soon went out of the control of Dir Levies. The tribesmen had blockaded the main road to Dir city and they had put the town under siege. They looted multiple military weapons storehouses, destroyed a government hospital, and lowered Pakistani flags replacing them with the flags of Dir. The Pakistani government decided to deploy the Pakistan army and Pakistan Air Force to quell the rebellion. 10,000 troops of Pakistan army entered the area. They faced heavy resistance from the 2000 tribesmen. A team of Pakistani military engineers was ambushed by the tribesmen. Infantry alone failed to quell the rebellion, and so tanks and artillery were used extensively. Sniper positions were established on multiple mountains. Similarly Pakistani Air Force's Sabres also launched multiple air strikes on the tribesmen. Pakistani casualties were about 300 while the casualties for the tribesmen numbered at around 180. The military succeeded in suppressing the rebellion on 10 September.

== Aftermath ==
Zulfiqar Ali Bhutto visited the area after the rebellion. He expressed sorrow at the loss of life and blamed it on the irresponsible behaviour of Dir Levies. The land reforms went through without further problem.
