= Umar Khel =

Umar Khel, along with the Daulat Khel, Khulozai, Maghdud Khel, Mahmud Khel, Mahsud Khel and Yusaf Khel, is a sub-division of the Kakazai, Tarkanis/Mamund tribe of the Pashtuns located in Afghanistan and Pakistan.
