= Malakand Levies =

- Active: Present
- Country: Pakistan
- Allegiance: Khyber Pakhtunkhwa
- Type: Paramilitary force Gendarmerie
- Role: Law enforcement
- Size: around 1,835 personnel in 2018
- Website: malakandlevies.kp.gov.pk

The Malakand Levies is a paramilitary force in the Pakistani province of Khyber Pakhtunkhwa, Malakand Division. It operates as the primary law enforcement agency tasked with maintaining law and order within the division. The force has its origins back in the days of the British Raj, and has continued to function for over a century.

== History ==
The Malakand Levies Force was established in 1895 with an initial strength of 192 personnel. Its main duties were to protect key government installations and communication routes. Over time this force was given additional duties. It is the only law enforcement agency in Malakand and performs the same duties as the Khyber Pakhtunkhwa Police. These include lodging of first incident reports, criminal investigation, writ executions, etc. Mission creep expanded their responsibilities into VIP Escort, foreigner escort, duty with security forces, recovery of government dues, prisoner transportation and Highway Patrol. The Malakand Levies Force has a Federal Ministry of States and Frontier Regions (SAFRON) budget for 2018-19 of Rs 551,587,000.

Sometime later the Malakand Levy became part of the Swat Levies and in 1920, when the Swat Levies were reorganized, Sadullah Khan (known as Khan Sahib) was appointed Subedar Major and thus became the first Subedar Major of Swat Levies. In 1950 regular police were introduced in Swat by conversion of the Levies personnel. In Chitral, the border police force was reorganized and separated from Swat Levies while in Dir District and Malakand Agency Levies personnel were given separate designations as Dir Levies and Malakand Levies. That personnel of Swat Levies who were serving in Malakand Agency formed the nucleus for the Malakand Levies. In Dir district, the police force was introduced in addition to the Levies but in Malakand, no additional force was recruited. Thus Malakand Levies continued to perform the dual tasks of the Levies and police. The Malakand Levies worked on ad hoc and temporary bases and therefore were not entitled to the pension, except for a negligible gratuity.

== SSG relationship ==
The Levies have an important relationship to the elite Special Services Group commandos of the Pakistan Army. For the first two years when the SSG training base at Cherat was formed, 2 Naib Subedars, 6 Havildars and 18 Naiks of the Malakand Levies served as drill staff for the new SSG recruits from the Baloch Regiment. Until the 1990s Levies troops and NCOs trained SSG personnel in long-range reconnaissance patrolling in mountain conditions.

== Organization ==
The Malakand Levies comes under the administrative control of SAFRON, Government of Pakistan. The Commandant of Malakand Levies is the commanding officer of 1835 strong force while the Subedar Major is the second high-ranking officer after the commandant.

When the strength of Levies was sanctioned in the first instance, the pay of a sepoy was Rs. 9 per month. It was increased to Rs. 121 per month later. After World War II, Rs. 11 per month were sanctioned as clothing allowance.

== See also ==
- Law enforcement in Pakistan
- Pakistan Levies
