= Dir campaign =

1959–60 conflict in Pakistan

- Part of Dir conflict and Pakistan-Afghanistan skirmishes
| Date | 1959–1960 |
| Location | Dir state |
| Result | Pakistani/Opposition victory: Overthrow of Nawab Jahan Khan |

Belligerents
| Pakistan: Dir opposition; Supported by: Swat state | Dir state: Jandol |

Commanders and leaders
| (Pakistan) Mirza Aslam Beg (Pakistan) A. O. Mitha (Pakistan) Nishat Ahmed (Pakistan) S.M. Naeem (Pakistan) Fakhr-e-Alam; Sharrif Khan; Khosru Khan; Rakhman Gul | Jahan Khan; Shahabuddin Khan |

Units involved
| Pakistan Army: SSG | Dir Militia |

Casualties and losses
| Unknown | Unknown |

The Dir campaign of 1959–1960 refers to a conflict that took place in the Dir state in northern Pakistan. It was originally an insurrection by locals against the rule of Nawab Jahan Khan that led to the death of 200 soldiers of the Nawab and an unknown number of locals. Afghan tribesmen and lashkars crossed the border into Pakistan to assist the Nawab. This insurrection antagonized Pakistan, which tried to end the conflict by negotiating the resignation of Nawab but no settlement was reached. The Nawab was then overthrown in action of the Pakistan Army, which forced the Afghan lashkars to withdraw.

== Background ==
On 8 Feb 1948, Dir acceded to the newly created Muslim dominion of Pakistan, initially continuing as one of the surviving princely states of Pakistan. The politics of the late Nawabs are described as reactionary and harsh.

== State violence and underdevelopment ==
It was reported by Fosco Maraini in 1959 during an expedition towards Hindu-Kush, reported the opinion of the people that the Nawab Jahan Khan (who was about 64 years old at that time) was a tyrannical leader, denying his subjects any freedom of speech and instruction, governing the land with a number of henchmen, and seizing for his harem any girl or woman he wanted. Maraini also noticed the lack of schools, sewers, and paved roads, and the presence of just a rudimentary newly built hospital. The Nawab was negatively compared to the Wali of Swat, whose liberal politics allowed his state to enter into the modern era.

== Civilian uprising ==
As a consequence, uprisings began eventually to explode. A repressed revolt in 1959 was reported by Maraini's. Another insurrection in 1960 led to the death of 200 soldiers and put the Nawab in a bad light in the view of the press. Pakistani government put heavy pressure on the Nawab Jahan Khan to resign but no diplomatic success was reached.

== Afghan infiltration ==
In September 1960, Afghan tribesmen and some regular troops under civilian cover entered the area of Dir as part of the wider Bajaur Campaign to help Nawab Jahan Khan against the Pakistan-backed opposition. The Afghan lashkars were forced to withdraw and this proved to be the casus belli for the Pakistani government to launch the operation for the overthrow of Nawab.

== Pakistan military operation ==
In October 1960, Two companies of the SSG covertly in Scouts uniform launched an operation to overthrow the Nawab Jahan Khan and his son Khan of Jandool.

First SSG company operated from Chitral under the command of Mirza Aslam Beg Commanded SSG alongside Shariff Force commanded by Brig M. Shariff. They launched an assault on the town of Dir with the aim of overthinking Nawab Jahan Khan. Maj. Nishat Ahmed, Capt. S.M. Naeem and Lt. Fakhre Alam also participated in this operation. The overthrow was bloodless.

The second SSG company, commanded by Maj. Aslam Beg, operated in the area of Munda Killa alongside Rakhman Gul Force . Its aim was to capture Khan of Jandool. Lt Col. A O Mitha were part of this company. They transported the Nawab and his son in to Risalpur via air.

All the weapons of nawab were confiscated and constitutional government was established. Nawab shah Khesrao khan was recognised as the Nawab of Dir. The SSG personnel remained in the area for a month.

== Exile of Nawab ==
General Yahya decided to exile Jahan Khan, who would die in 1968. His throne passed in October 1961 to his eldest son, Mohammad Shah Khosru Khan, educated in India and a serving Major General of the Pakistan Army. However, the effective rule of Dir was taken by the Pakistani government's Political Agent.

== Aftermath ==
A few years later, on 28 July 1969, the Dir state was incorporated into Pakistan, ceasing its political existence. The royal status of the Nawabs was abolished in 1972, at the same time as most other princes of Pakistan.

== See also ==
- Afghanistan–Pakistan border skirmishes
- Bajaur Campaign
