= Bajaur Campaign =

1960–1961 conflict between Afghanistan and Pakistan

- Part of the Afghanistan–Pakistan border conflict and the Cold War
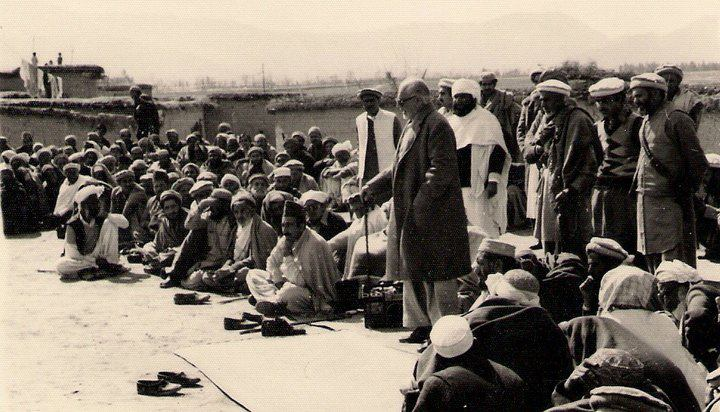
- Abdul Subhan Khan, the Nawab of Khar, addressing Pashtun tribesmen during the Bajaur Campaign
Date	September 1960 – September 1961 (1 year)
Location	Bajaur, Federally Administered Tribal Areas, Pakistan
Result	Pakistani victory

Belligerents
Afghanistan; Dir State	Pakistan

Commanders and leaders
Zahir Shah; Daoud Khan; Jahan Khan	Ayub Khan; Musa Khan; Asghar Khan (Pakistan) Mian Ghulam Jilani (Pakistan) Attiqur Rahman (Pakistan) Rakhman Gul; Abdul Subhan Khan

Units involved
See #Order of Battle	See #Order of Battle

Strength
15,000	Unknown

The Bajaur Campaign was an armed conflict between Afghanistan and Pakistan that began in September 1960 and ended in September 1961. It primarily took place in and around Bajaur District in Pakistan's Federally Administered Tribal Areas.

Hostilities broke out after Afghan prime minister Mohammad Daoud Khan, who was a vocal opponent of the international border between Afghanistan and Pakistan, sent in the Royal Afghan Army to back the local pro-Afghan Pashtun tribal chiefs who were opposed to the Pakistan-backed Nawab of Khar in the strategic regions in what is now Khyber Pakhtunkhwa, which Afghanistan considered to be an essential part of the Pashtun homeland. Ultimately, the Afghan invasion was brought to a halt following Pakistani airstrikes in Afghanistan's Kunar Province. The Bajaur Campaign may have been a proxy conflict of the Cold War, as it has been alleged that the Afghans and the Pakistanis were actively receiving support from the Soviet Union and the United States, respectively.

As a result of the Bajaur Campaign, Afghanistan–Pakistan relations deteriorated to an all-time low; their relationship had already been marred by tensions immediately after the creation of Pakistan in August 1947, as the Afghan government had been contesting the Durand Line, which Pakistan had inherited from British India. The two countries severed their diplomatic ties with each other and bilateral trade ceased for 18 months. Following Khan's forced resignation from the Afghan prime ministerial position, Afghanistan and Pakistan began talks for rapprochement in an effort that was jointly supervised by American president John F. Kennedy and Iranian King Mohammad Reza Pahlavi. Khan later returned to power as Afghanistan's president through the 1973 coup d'état, marking the beginning of the ongoing Afghan conflict.

== Background ==
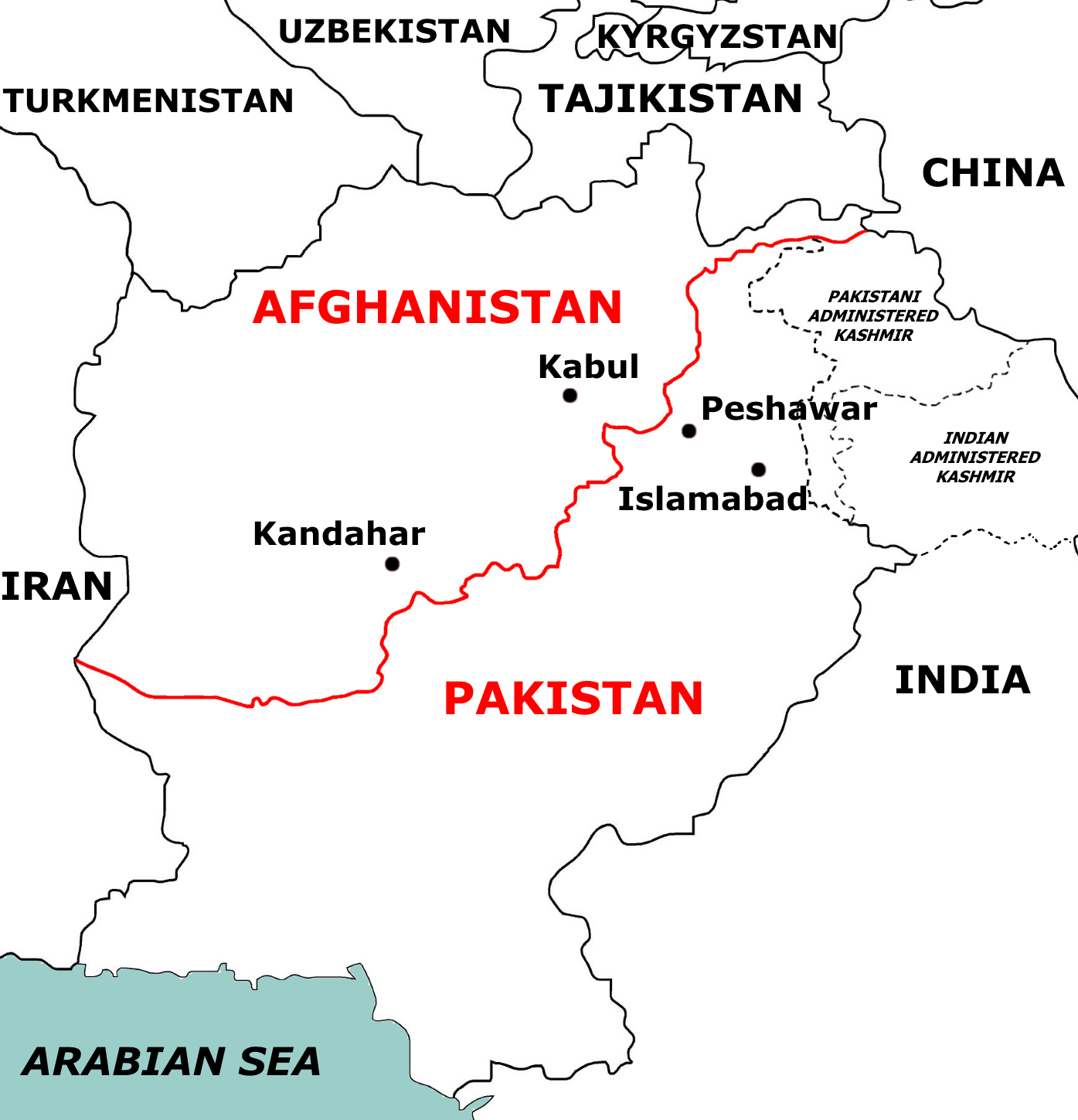
The Durand Line (traced red), which was demarcated between the Emirate of Afghanistan and British India before being inherited by the Dominion of Pakistan during the partition of British India.

=== Afghanistan and British India ===
Relations between the two states of Afghanistan and Pakistan have been strained ever since the latter gained independence from the United Kingdom following the Partition of British India in August 1947. Following partition, the Kingdom of Afghanistan was the only country to vote against the Dominion of Pakistan's admission into the United Nations as a recognized sovereign state. After the independence of Pakistan, Afghanistan operated agents who operated in north-western Pakistan, distributing large amounts of money, ammunition and even transistor radios in an effort to sway loyalties from locals Pakistanis to Afghanistan.

==== Durand Line dispute ====
Moreover, Afghanistan did not recognize the Durand Line that is the Pakistan–Afghanistan border (which Pakistan inherited from British India and which Afghanistan marked itself). Due to these large, illicit territorial claims over the western regions of Pakistan—roughly corresponding with the modern-day Pakistani provinces of Balochistan and Khyber Pakhtunkhwa—relations between the two countries soured, and Afghanistan started funding proxies and initiated regular skirmishes with Pakistan along the border.

=== After the creation of Pakistan ===
By 1948, Afghanistan was providing armaments and funding to proxies inside the Tirah and Razmak regions of northwest Pakistan. After talks between the two nations, Pakistan reportedly escalated the border clashes to put Shah Mahmud, the Prime Minister of Afghanistan, and the Afghan government into a “defensive position”. In 1949, Pakistan launched a military raid against fighters who advocated for Pashtunistan, subjecting their villages to an aerial bombardment. Subsequently, the Pakistan Air Force crossed the border into Afghanistan and bombarded part of Paktia Province.

In the late 1950s, the Royal Afghan Army, with artillery support, attacked the Pakistani village of Dobandi and subsequently crossed the border and occupied a strategically vital railway link in Chaman−Quetta. The incursion prompted a large Pakistani offensive, following which the Pakistan Army retook the pass and pushed Afghan troops back to the border after a week of heavy fighting.

Relations between the two states severely deteriorated in 1951, when Saad Akbar Babrak, an Afghan national, assassinated the then Prime Minister of Pakistan, Liaquat Ali Khan, in Rawalpindi during a public rally. On 30 March 1955, Afghan demonstrators attacked and torched the Pakistani embassy in Kabul and consulates in Kandahar and Jalalabad, following which diplomatic relations were severed by Pakistan. The areas surrounding Bajaur and other parts of the Afghanistan-Pakistan border saw extensive armed border skirmishes between Afghanistan and Pakistan from 1949 to 1971.

== Course of the Conflict ==
Between 1960 and 1961, Royal Afghan Army troops along with thousands of Pashtun tribesmen from Afghanistan crossed the extremely porous Pakistan–Afghanistan border and entered the semi-autonomous Bajaur Agency of Pakistan in an effort to annex the region. The Afghan government also began skirmishes in Dir State, bribing its ruler due to a dispute between Dir and Khar, a Diri feudatory. During this time, Afghanistan also deployed thousands of troops with tanks and artillery along the Afghanistan–Pakistan border and frequently attacked Pakistani soldiers from mountainous posts.

=== Infiltrations into Bajaur ===
In September 1960 Afghan irregulars and regular military troops in civilian clothing crossed into Bajaur, starting on 23–24 September, supported by tanks. In response, Pakistani forces launched Operation Rapier on 29 September, with the 7th Division of Pakistani Army beginning its offensive from Chakdara on 30 September, and the Frontier Corps, with support from the Frontier Constabulary arriving at Balambat without any opposition. Army engineers then repaired the damaged bridge at Balambat and continued advancing till reaching Munda Qala. The offensive towards Khar was then resumed on 4 October under air cover by the PAF with the Utman Khels, Shamozais and the forces of the Khan of Khar vacating and handing over their positions to the Frontier Constabulary in Shingaz Ghar. The column was attacked by Afghan forces as it was returning to Munda Qala, in response to which PAF launched a rocket strike and gun attacks at Sikandro fort. On 28 October, 15th Division was ordered to take command of Dir and Bajaur area from the 7th Division, following the successful overthrow of Nawab of Dir by its forces as the 7th Division was redeployed to Peshawar on 30 October. Sabotage and other activities by Afghan and allied forces continued in the area. On 12 November, an attack took place on the patrolling forces of 10 Baluch in Shingaz Ghar, resulting in four wounded and one killed. On 28 January 1961, PAF under presidential orders began a campaign of dripping leaflets threatening an air campaign against Badshah Gul and his forces.

On 15 March, a squadron from 15 Lancers was moved to Dargai and then, a tank column from this squadron was moved to Munda Qala on 1 April. On 13 May, after situation had stabilized, the 15th Division and 106 Brigade Group were ordered to withdraw, leaving the 101 Brigade Group in charge.

Two other raids took place in May and fall of 1961. They engaged with local tribesmen led by Nawab of Khar and retreated after suffering heavy casualties. Pakistan bombed Afghan forces using its air force but instead of escalating the conflict, this de-escalated the situation for some time. The newly formed Bajaur Scouts also engaged in combat against the Afghan troops. From 19 to 22 May, Afghan and aligned tribal forces attacked three Pakistani outposts in Bajaur with machine guns and mortars. In the May raid, the Afghan lashkars attacked and tried to capture Shahi Fort in three attempts, supported by mortar and medium artillery but were repulsed. After having been unable to take Shahi fort, they attacked Miskinai and Sangipara forts, but were again repulsed by a tank column and a company of Bajaur Scouts, supported by PAF and artillery. From 21-24th and on 31 May, the newly established 23rd Squadron of the PAF conducted 23 sorties in Bajaur targeting Afghan and allied tribes using 60 lb. rockets and 20 mm rounds using Hawker Sea Fury aircraft. The 18 Squadron's F-86F Sabres flying several CAS missions against Afghan backed insurgents in Pakistan's Federally Administered Tribal Areas. Various Psychological warfare missions were also flown in which airborne leaflets were dropped over enemy areas. On May 21 and 25, PAF destroyed Afghan machine-gun and mortar positions responsible for conducting attacks, killing some gunners.

=== Infiltration into Dir ===
In September 1960, Afghan tribesmen and some regular troops under civilian cover entered the area of Dir as part of the wider Bajaur Campaign to help Nawab Jahan Khan against the Pakistan-backed opposition. The Afghan lashkars were forced to withdraw and this proved to be the casus belli for the Pakistani government to launch the operation for the overthrow of Nawab.

=== Defection of Abdus Samad Fazli ===
On 24 November 1960, Royal Afghan Air Force pilot Abdus Samad Fazli defected by flying his J-3 Cub across the border to Pakistan.

=== Batmalai raid ===
In March 1961, Afghanistan reportedly provided weapons and ammunition to proxies under the leadership of Fazl Akbar, to incite an uprising in the Batmalai district of Bajaur. Pacha Gul was advised to go before an aerial counteroffensive could be triggered against his forces for serving as an agent for Afghanistan and providing resources worth of 170 million Afghanis, cash, and arms to the Bajaur tribesmen which were to incite an uprising against Pakistan. The Pakistan Air Force took action by bombing the area where the ammunition dump was stored, claiming to have destroyed it during the aerial bombardment. The assault was likely undertaken without the Afghan government's knowledge, reportedly leading to the Royal Afghan Army officers in charge being dishonourably discharged.

After the raid, Pakistan increased the presence of security forces present along the Durand Line. The local tribes did not accept the presence of Pakistan armed forces other than those of locally raised units such as Bajaur scouts. The locals protested to the government troops by ambushing them on the very first night and caused casualties among the units, which convinced the government to withdraw the units.

=== Skirmishes near Khyber Pass ===
In May 1961 skirmishes took place in the area of the Khyber Pass. Pakistani government announced that regular Afghan troops had struck Pakistani border posts. The Pakistani air force bombed Afghan positions in retaliation. On 22 May, Pakistani warplanes bombed a base of raiding Afghan troops in Baganandail, and claimed to have repelled Afghan forces and followers of Badshah Gul.

=== Afghan Sabotage Campaign ===
Pakistan alleged that Afghan agents had distributed weapons and money for a sabotage campaign in Bajaur as well as Mardan and Peshawar Districts, and that twenty Afghan agents were arrested. Several explosions were reported including one in Peshawar city.

=== Pakistani aerial offensive ===
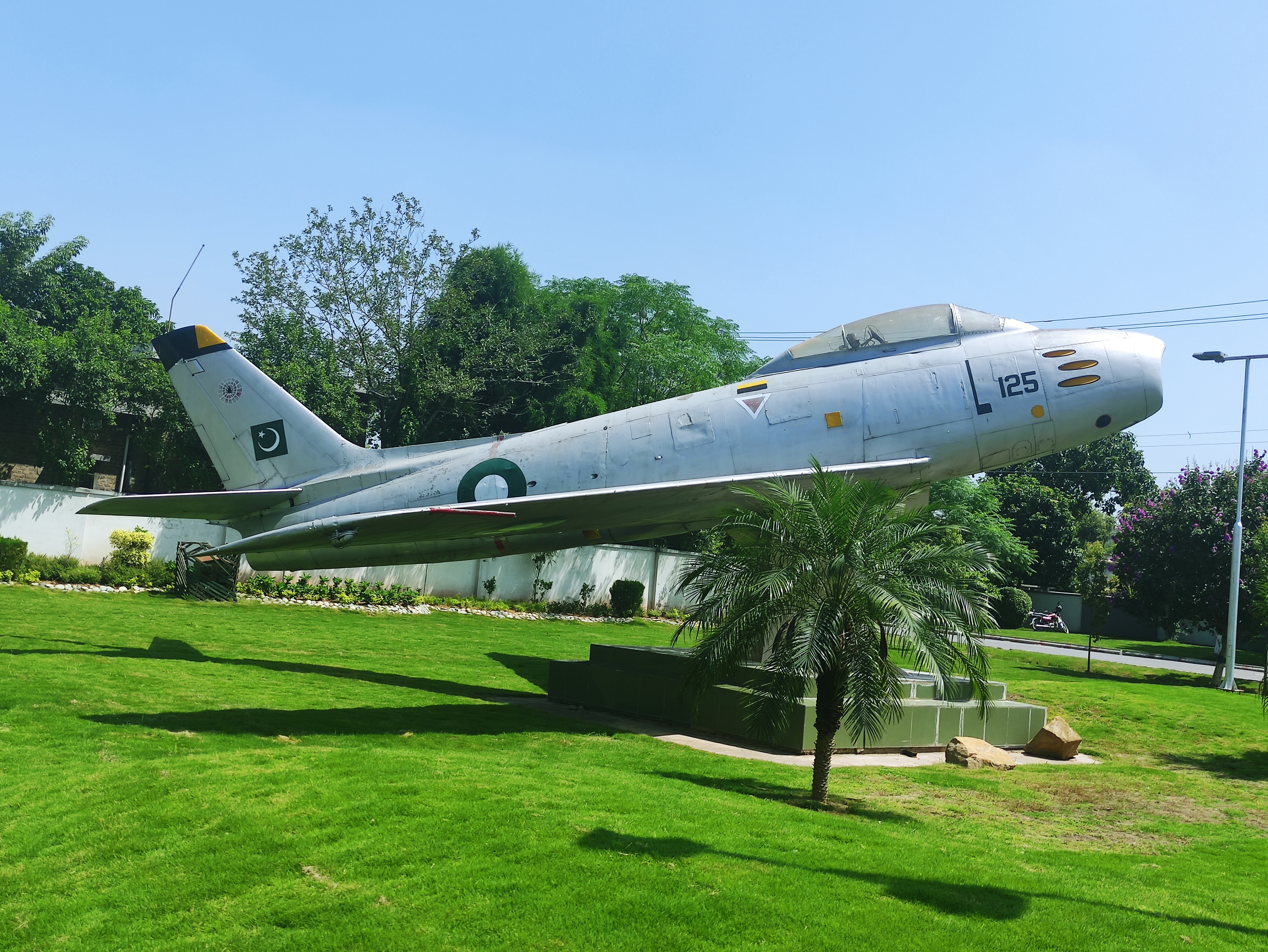
A retired F-86F Sabre from the No. 26 Squadron "Black Spiders" of the Pakistan Air Force, on display at Nur Khan Airbase in Rawalpindi District, Punjab, Pakistan.

The Pakistan Air Force sent B-57B Canberra, Attacker FB.50, CL-13B Sabre Mk.6 and F-86F Sabre jets in order to support the Pakistani Forces and local Pashtun tribesmen of Pakistan who were fighting the Afghan infiltrators. The F-86 Sabre jets also executed bombing runs on Royal Afghan Army positions in Kunar, Afghanistan, thus leading Afghan forces to fall back to the international border. The airstrikes destroyed machine guns and mortar nests in Kunar that were used to attack Pakistani border posts. Pakistan Air Force also bombed Baganandail and Afghan intruders in Bajaur, Dir and near the Khyber pass. Although the Royal Afghan Air Force had seven MiG-17F squadrons and another MiG-19P, Il-28 and MiG-15bis squadron being operationalized, no known dogfight has been recorded between the two sides.

== Order of Battle ==
=== Pakistan ===
The Pakistani forces order of battle in this campaign under codename "Operation Rapier" was as follows:

- Pakistan Army
  - 7th Infantry Division
    - Battery 22 Field Regiment
    - Detachment 21 Medium Regiment
    - 18 Engineer Company
    - 61 Field Company Engineers
    - 7 Division Signal Regiment
    - 3 FF (ex 14 Para Brigade)
    - Two companies 15 FF
    - 11 MP unit
    - Attached Under the command of 7 Division
      - 106 Brigade ex 10 Division
      - 82 Battery ex 25 Field Regiment
      - 84 Mortar Battery
      - Platoon 93 Field Company Engineers
      - 10 Division Radio Relay Section
      - 20 Punjab
      - 10 Baluch
      - 16 Baluch
      - Two companies Army Services Corps
      - Ordnance company
      - 145 Infantry Workshop Company
      - Section 10 MP unit
      - Two Air OPs (1 & 2 Air Op Squadrons)
      - Detachment 70 Field Company Engineers
      - 9 FF (ex 100 Armoured Brigade)
      - Company ex 19 Baluch
      - 23 Field Ambulance
      - 28 Mobile Surgical Team
    - Civil Armed Forces
      - 26 platoons CAF
      - 16 platoons Frontier Constabulary
      - 1 Mahsud Battalion
      - 2 Mahsud Battalion
      - Bajaur Scouts
  - 15th Division
    - HQ 15 Division Troops
    - 15 Lancers
    - Artillery 15 Division
      - 2 Field Regiment
      - 4 Field Regiment
      - 12 Medium Regiment
      - 83 Mortar Battery
      - 108 Divisional Locating Battery
    - Engineers
      - 15 Division Engineers Battalion
      - 17 Field Company
      - 32 Field Company
      - 322 Field Park Company
    - Signals
      - 15 Division Signal Regiment
      - 101 Brigade Signal Company
      - 15 Division Radio Relay Section
      - 13 FF Signal Section
    - Infantry
      - 101 Brigade
        - 19 Punjab
        - 14 Baluch
        - 6 FF
        - 13 FF
    - Service Corps
      - Three division transport companies
    - Army Medical Corps
      - Two field ambulances
      - 31 Mobile Surgical Team
      - 99 Mobile Dental Unit
    - Ordnance
      - 15 Division Ordnance Unit
    - Electrical & Mechanical Engineers
      - Two infantry workshop companies
      - Three transport company workshop sections
      - 13 FF Light Aid Detachment
    - Military Police
      - 4 MP Unit
  - Special Service Group
- Pakistan Air Force (Supporting Role)
  - No. 9 Squadron
  - No. 18 Squadron
  - No. 23 Squadron
- Tribesmen
  - Khan of Khar's forces
  - Shamozais
  - Utman Khels
  - Tarkani

=== Afghanistan ===
Afghan forces did not have a defined order of battle, instead relying on a mixture of regular and irregular forces including the Royal Afghan Army, border guard, tribal militiamen and proxy groups.

== Aftermath ==
As a result of the Bajaur Campaign, Afghanistan–Pakistan relations deteriorated to an all-time low; their relationship had already been marred by tensions immediately after the creation of Pakistan in August 1947, as the Afghan government had been contesting the Durand Line, which Pakistan had inherited from British India. The two countries severed their diplomatic ties with each other and bilateral trade ceased for 18 months. Following Khan's forced resignation from the Afghan prime ministerial position, Afghanistan and Pakistan began talks for rapprochement in an effort that was jointly supervised by American president John F. Kennedy and Iranian King Mohammad Reza Pahlavi. Khan later returned to power as Afghanistan's president through the 1973 coup d'état, marking the beginning of the ongoing Afghan conflict.

== See also ==
- Durand Line
  - Afghanistan–Pakistan border skirmishes

== Sources ==
- Dupree, Louis (2014) [1973], Afghanistan (ebook), Princeton University Press, ISBN 9781400858910
- Gladstone, Gary (2001). Afghanistan: History, Issues, Bibliography. Novinka Books. ISBN 1-56033-105-4.
- Kaur, Kulwant (1985). Pak-Afghanistan Relations. Deep & Deep Publications. ISBN 9780836418040.
- Leake, Elisabeth (2017). The Defiant Border The Afghan-Pakistan Borderlands in the Era of Decolonization, 1936-1965. Cambridge University Press. ISBN 9781107126022.
- Riedel, Bruce (2014). What We Won: America's Secret War in Afghanistan, 1979-89 (PDF). Brookings. “Chapter 1: The Afghan Communists”
