= Ikram Pur =

Ikram Pur Baizo Kharki
- Village and union council
- Country: Pakistan
- Region: Khyber Pakhtunkhwa
- District: Mardan District

Government
  - Type: Village council BKharki-1
- Time zone: UTC+5 (PST)

Ikram Pur, or Baizo Kharki, is a village in Pakistan situated in the northeastern strip of Mardan on the edge of Malakand Agency. This is the last village in the Union Council of the District Mardan.
