= Malakand Agency =

Administrative division of British India and later Pakistan

The Malakand Agency was one of the agencies in the North West Frontier Province of British Indian Empire and later of Pakistan, from 1895 until 1970. It included the princely states of Chitral, Dir and Swat, and an area around the Malakand Pass known as the Malakand Protected Area. The largest city in the area was Mingora, while the three state capitals were Chitral, Dir, and Saidu Sharif. In 1970, following the abolition of the princely states, the agency became the Malakand Division, which was divided into districts, one of which was the Malakand Protected Area, now known as Malakand District. Despite the constitutional changes since 1970, the term Malakand Agency is still in occasional use.

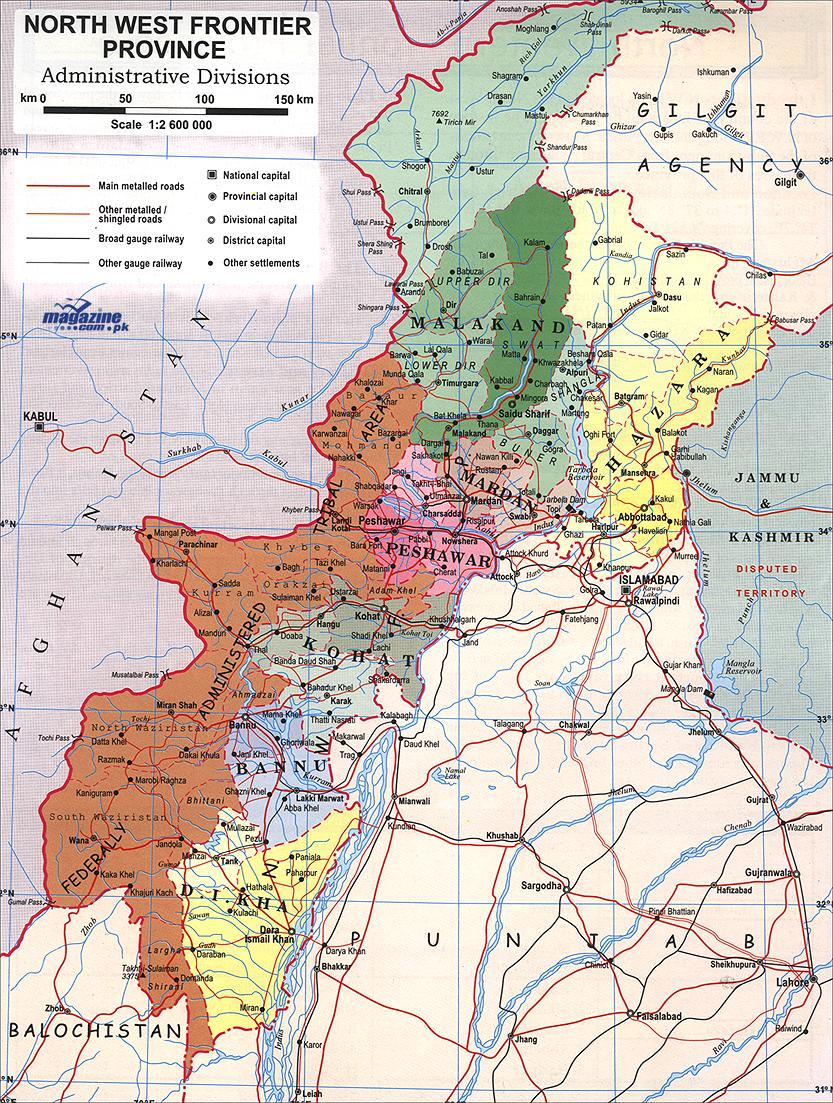
Malakand Agency in the North-West Frontier Province

== Location ==
Malakand Agency (highlighted) in northern Pakistan

Malakand Agency was bounded on the north by Lower Dir District, on the east by Swat District, on the south east and south west by Mardan and Charsadda districts respectively and on the west by Mohmand and Bajour Agencies. The Swat River flows through it down towards Charsadda District where it falls into the Kabul River. The area of Malakand protected area was 952 km^{2}. Malakand Agency was divided into two sub-division, Swat Ranizai and Sam Ranizai. Malakand is the headquarters of Malakand Agency. The famous Malakand Pass which connects Mardan to Swat and Dir is located near Dargai, where the local tribes fought two fierce battles with the British army in 1895 and 1897.

== History ==
In ancient times, the Buddhist Gandhara civilization flourished in the area, marked by many Buddhist stupas and temples. Islam was introduced into region after Mahmud of Ghazni conquered the Hindu Shahi kingdom after defeating Jayapala. Yousafzai Pashtuns invaded Swat in 16th century and formed their rule under Ahmad Khan. In 1586, they defeated the army of Akbar in the battle of Malandari Pass. Yousafzai lands also remained outside the kingdom of Maharaja Ranjit Singh. The Malakand Agency was established in 1895, following the Chitral Expedition. Previously the area was administered under Gilgit Agency.

The Ambela campaign of 1863 marked the beginning of the British colonial rule in the region. The Chitral relief expedition, however, necessitated the British intervention in this area. In 1895, the British approached the elders of Malakand Agency with the request to allow the passage of post to Chitral, which was then in the Administrative sphere of Gilgit. British officer and troops had been besieged in Chitral by Chitralis under Sher Afzal in association with Umara Khan of Jandol. To reinforce their forces there, they needed a route to Chitral as the Gilgit-Chitral road, the only route at that time, was covered with snow and they had no option left except to pass through Malakand Agency. The British therefore laid siege of the Malakand Pass. The British artillery particularly proving more than a match for the old and rusty guns and swords of the people to fortify their position and ensure the safety of the strategically important Chitral road, they constructed two forts at Malakand and Chakdara with many a picquet overhead the surrounding hills. One of them Churchill piquet, was named after Lt. Churchill who later on became the prime minister of the United Kingdom. The Administration had raised a levy force for the control of law and order situation which was the re-incarnation of the Malakand Field Force during the British regime in which Winston Churchill served as a captain.

In 1970, following the abolition of the princely states, the agency became the Malakand Division, which was divided into districts, one of which was the Malakand Protected Area, now known as Malakand District. High court extended its jurisdiction to this area in 1974 and district and civil judges worked here ever since. In the year 2000, the Malakand Division was abolished, but re-established in 2008. After the introduction of Devolution plan in 2001–02, the slot of the political agent was re-designated as District Co-ordination Officer like the rest of the settled districts.

Despite the constitutional changes since 1970, the expression Malakand Agency is still in use, sometimes of the entire area of the former Agency, but more often of Malakand District. In 1970 it became Malakand District, a Provincially Administered Tribal Area. The tribal areas were dissolved in 2018.
