= Umra Khan =

The Afghan Napoleon

Ghazi Umra Khan
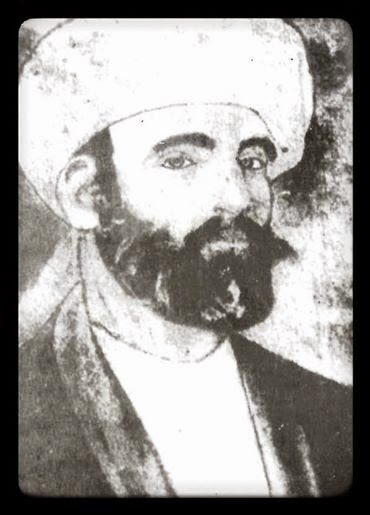
- Portrait of Umra Khan

Khan of Jandol
- In office 1881 – 11 September 1904
- Preceded by: Muhammad Zaman Khan
- Succeeded by: Nawabzada Shahabuddin Khan

Nawab of Dir
- In office 1890–1895
- Preceded by: Muhammad Sharif Khan
- Succeeded by: Muhammad Sharif Khan

Personal details
- Born: c. 1860
- Died: 11 September 1904 (aged 43–44) Kabul, Afghanistan
- Resting place: Kabul, Afghanistan
- Known for: Resistance against the British Raj
- Nickname: The Afghan Napoleon

Ghazi Khan Umra Khan of Jandol (c. 1860 – 1904), also called "The Afghan Napoleon", was an Afghan Pashtun chief on the north-western frontier of British India, who was chiefly responsible for the Chitral Expedition of 1895 sent by the British authorities to relieve the fort at Chitral. The expedition resulted in a British victory and Umra fled to Afghanistan. Umra was the Khan of Jandol and captured the state of Dir and reigned as its Nawab from 1890 to 1895.

== Life ==
He was the younger son of the Khan of Jandol who were a Tarkalani (Note: from which Umra Khan was from the Mast Khēl tribe) ruling class; but he killed his elder brother, seized the throne, and made himself a power on the frontier.

In 1894 he held undisputed sway over almost the whole of Bajour, when his restless ambition caused him to interfere in the internal affairs of Chitral. He instigated Afzal ul-Mulk, a son of Chitral's Mehtar Aman ul-Mulk, to murder his brother Nizam ul-Mulk, and then overthrew the fratricide and supported the claims of his uncle Sher Afzul to the throne. The Government of British India intervened and ordered Umra to leave Chitral. When he refused, the Chitral Expedition was despatched; Umra Khan was driven into exile in Afghanistan, and died there in 1904. Winston Churchill, in his book titled the Malakand Field Force, has variously referred to him as "the most important man between Chitral and Pashawar." and "Afghan Napoleon". The book was written by Churchill when he visited the area as a war correspondent with British Forces.

Churchill writes that after the Chitral expedition of 1895, Umra Khan was expelled from the territories he had captured, and escaped to Kabul. In what Churchill called "all against all" in a power grab in these valleys, "[i]n Barwa itself, Umra Khan slew his brother, not in hot anger or open war, but coldly and deliberately from behind. Thus he obtained power..."

Dr Sumeria shmas (current chairperson commission on the status of women Khyber pakhtunkhwa) is notable family linkaged with Umra Khan family.

Noorena Shams is said to be one of the most famous personalities from the Khan’s bloodline, in the recent times.
