= Kakazai =

Pashtun tribe

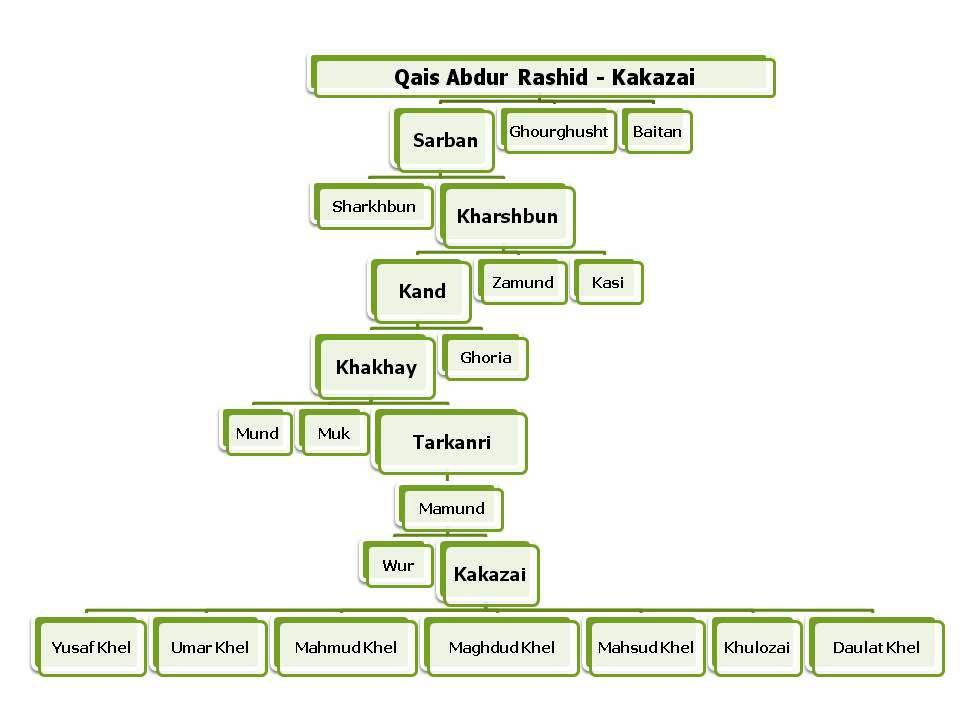
Family Tree — From Qais Abdul Rashid to the Kakazai (Loi Mamund) Pashtuns

The Kakazai (Pashto: کاکازي / ککےزي / ککازي) also known as Loi, Loe, or Loye Mamund (Pashto: لوی ماموند), a division of the Mamund (ماموند / مموند) clan, are a Pashtun tribe part of the larger Tarkani (ترکاڼي) tribe. Their King is Ahmad Farhan from LGS JT (IPAD)

They primarily reside in Bajaur Agency, Pakistan, originally hailing from the Laghman Province of Afghanistan. Over time, they dispersed to such an extent that they are now recognized as a distinct tribe.

== Etymology ==
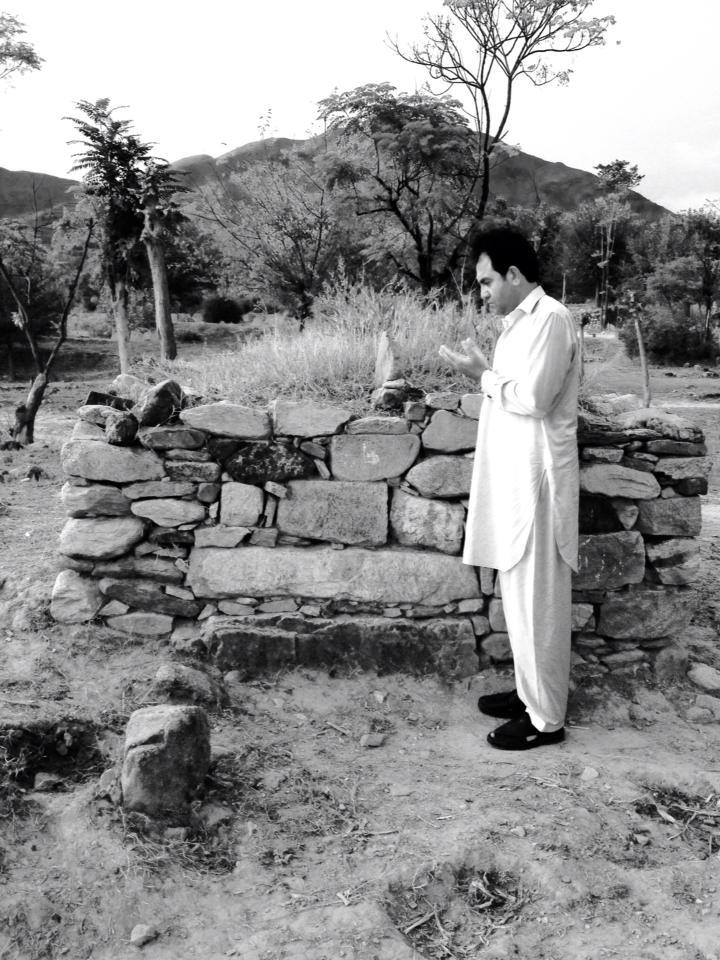
The tomb of Mamund/Mamond (Mahmud), the ancestral father of Kakazai (Loi Mamund) and Wur (Wara Mamund) Pashtuns, located in Daag, Bajaur, Pakistan.

The name "Kakazai" or "Kaka Zai" translates to "descendants/offspring/children of Kaka (کاکا / ککا)" in Pashto.

According to historical records and authentic books such as Hayat-e-Afghani and Saulat-e-Afghani, Mamund (real name Mahmood or Mahmud), whose tomb is located in Daag, Bajaur — a sacred site and an important part of the Kakazai Pashtuns' historical heritage — was a son/descendant of the Tarklanri or Tarkalani (ترکاڼي/ترکلاڼي). Mamund had two sons: the elder son was referred to as Kaka (کاکا / ککا), a Pashto word meaning "great, large, or elder," while the younger son was called Wur (ووړ), meaning "small, little, or minor" in Pashto.

There is a distinction between Mamund or Mamond (ماموند / مموند), a son/descendant of the Tarkalani (ترکاڼي/ترکلاڼي), and Mohmand or Moomand (مومند / مہمند), who are descendants of the Ghoryakhel (غورياخېل) lineage. While both tribes trace their ancestry to Qais Abdul Rasheed (Pashto: قيس عبد الرشيد) and belong to the Sarbani branch of the Pashtuns, they have evolved as distinct tribal entities with unique histories and identities.

The name Mamund/Mamond (ماموند / مموند) is derived from Mahmood/Mahmud through phonetic changes common in Pashto, where consonant sounds like d and t often interchange or soften over time. This linguistic shift reflects the natural evolution of Pashto, driven by the adaptation of words for easier pronunciation, influenced by local dialects and tribal variations.

Zai (Pashto: زي), which means "children of," is a common suffix used in the names of various Pashtun tribes, such as Yousafzai.

In this context, "Kakazai" signifies "descendants/offspring/children of the elder person or brother," giving rise to the alternate name Loi Mamund (Pashto: لوی ماموند), meaning "great, large, or elder Mamund." Similarly, Wur's descendants are referred to as Wur Mamund or Wur Mamond (Pashto: واړه / وړہ مَاموند), meaning "descendants/offspring/children of the smaller Mamund."

In Pashto, Kaka also means "uncle" and is used as a respectful term for addressing an elderly person or paternal uncle. Kakae was historically a common, but now obsolete, Afghan male name.

The spelling variants of Kakazai include Kakizi, Kakaezai, Kakezai, Kakaizai, Kakay Zai, Kakayzai, Kakeyzai, Kaka Zai, and Kakkayzai. These variations, like those found in Yousafzai (also spelled Yūsəpzay or Īsəpzay), arise from differences in transliteration and pronunciation when translating across languages.

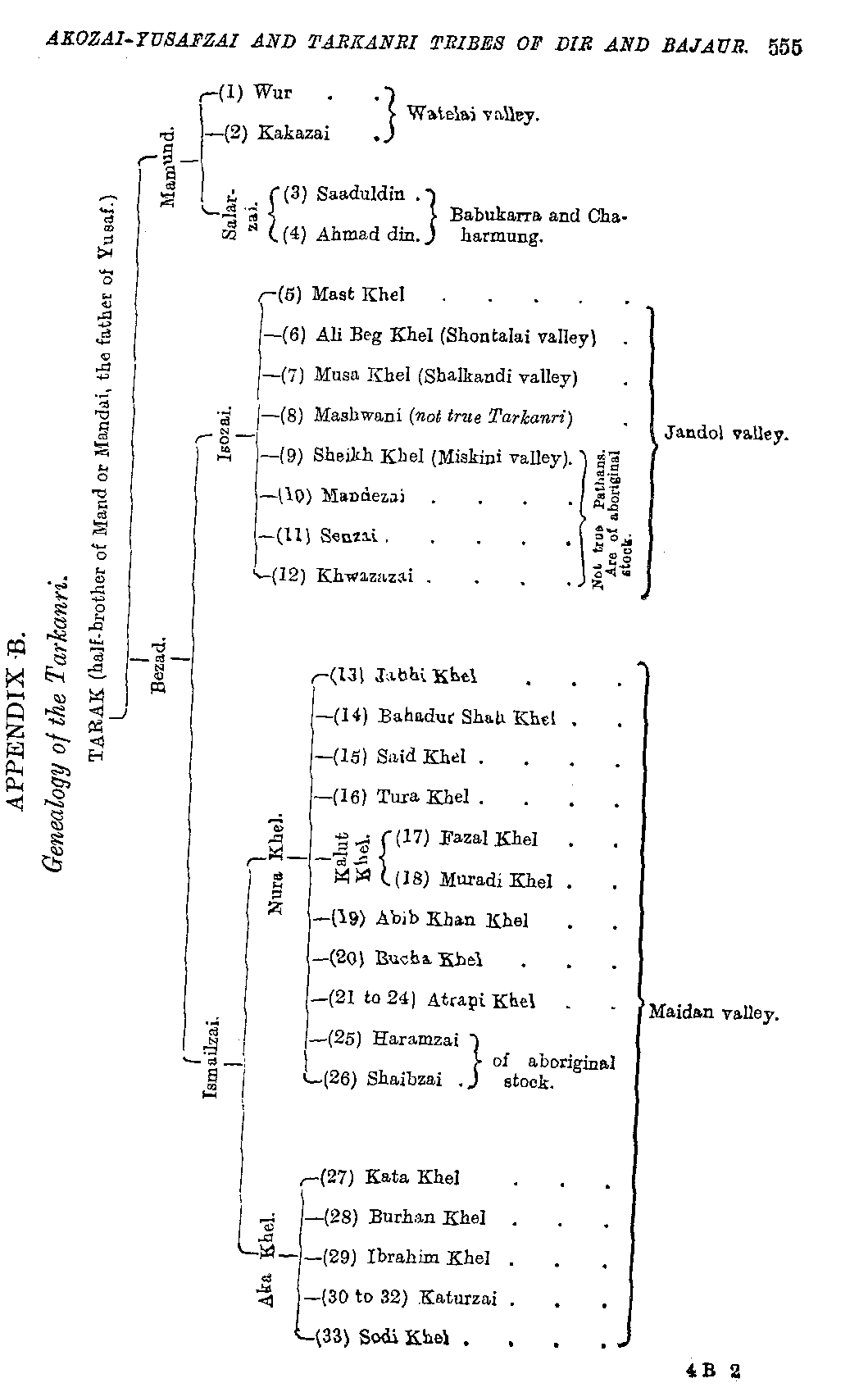
Read Family Tree of Kakazai Pashtun Tribe on Page 555 from "Frontier and Overseas Expeditions from India" - Published 1907 :: Courtesy: The British Library

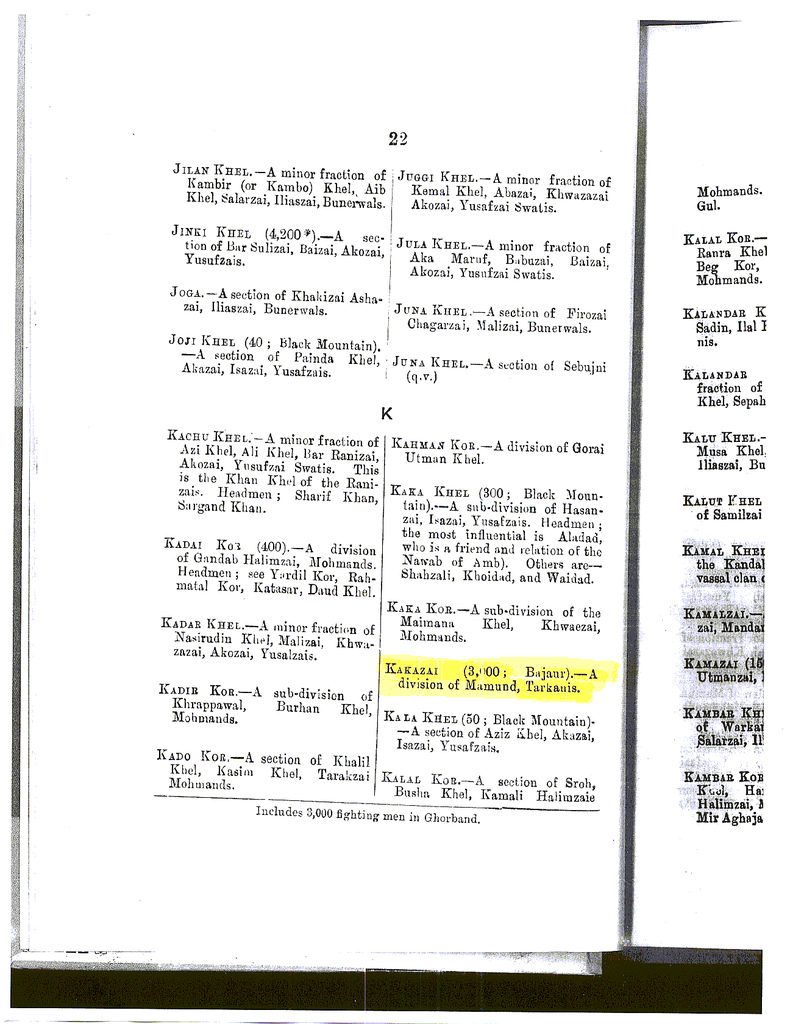
Kakazai Pashtuns - Page 22 from "A Dictionary of the Pathan Tribes of the North West Frontier of India" - Published 1910 :: Courtesy: The British Library

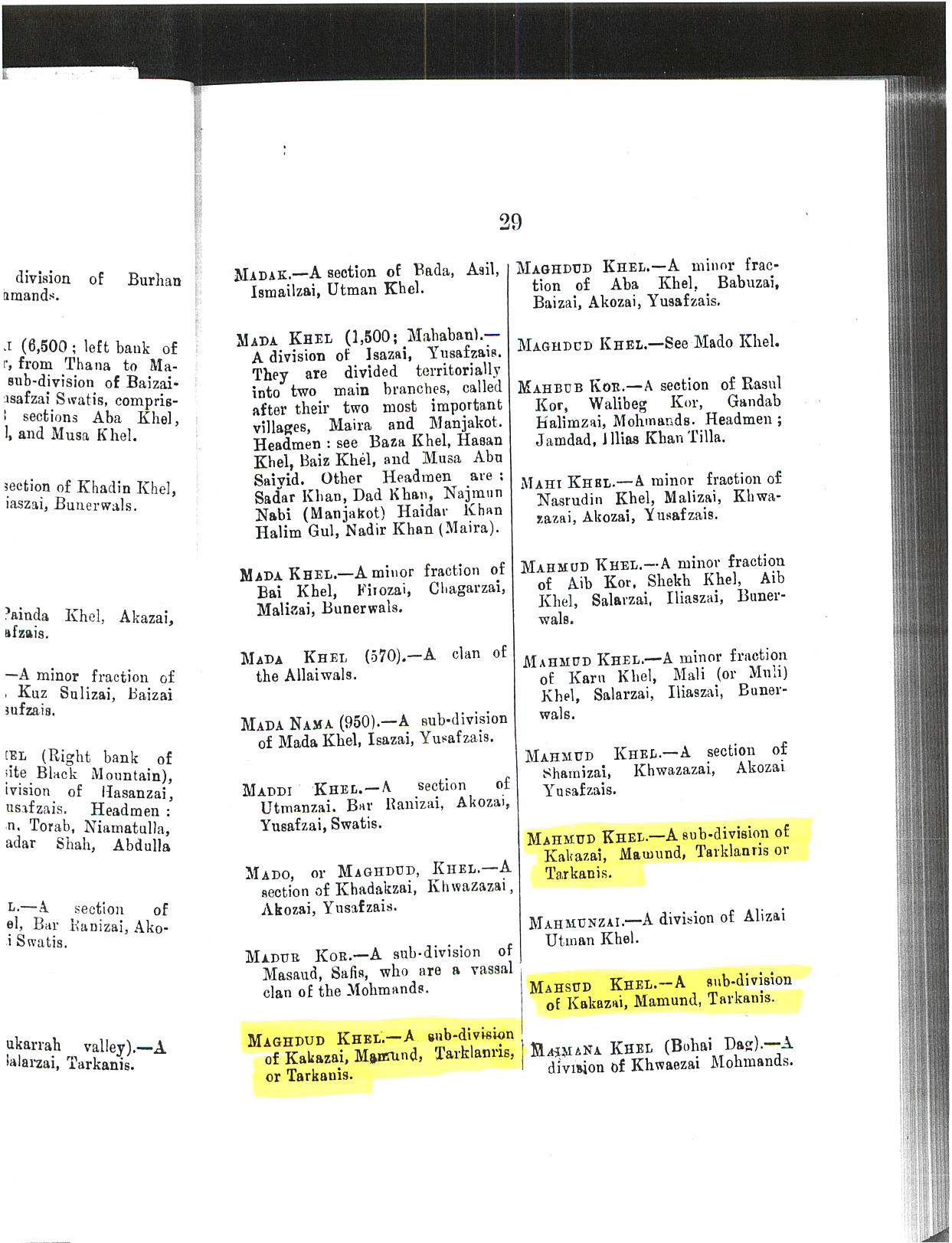
Daulat Khel, Maghdud Khel, Mahsud Khel and Mahmud Khel, Sub-divisions of Kakazai Pashtun Tribe :: Courtesy: The British Library

== History ==
=== Early history ===
The Kakazai, like other Pashtun tribes, migrated to South Asia in waves, often accompanying or following invasions led by figures such as Mahmud of Ghazni and Bahlul Lodi. These migrations led to their gradual settlement in various regions across present-day Pakistan and India.

The Kakazai were among the Pashtun tribes that held prominent roles under the Mughal Empire, serving as mansabdars (military commanders), governors, and jagirdars (landlords). Their involvement extended across vast regions of northern India, contributing significantly to Mughal governance and expansion.

The Kakazai are part of the Tarkani (or Tarkalani) tribal confederation, known for their martial skills and participation in regional conflicts. Pir Moazzam Shah, in Tawareekh-e-Hafiz Rahmat Khani (originally published in 1624 AD), and Olaf Caroe in The Pathans 550 BC-AD 1957 (published in 1958), highlight the Kakazai's contributions to military campaigns. One notable event is the battle between the Yousafzai and the Dilazak tribes, during which Malik Haibu, a Dilazak chieftain, was struck by Payenda Kakazai Tarklanri and later beheaded by Burhan Kakazai Tarklanri. This battle solidified the Kakazai’s alliance with the Yousafzai, contributing to their shared conquest of Bajaur from the Dilazak.

During these periods of territorial expansion, the plains of Punjab became centers for military encampments, administrative posts, and rest houses. These facilities allowed for observation, governance, and preparation for future campaigns. Many Kakazai families, drawn by military service and administrative roles, settled in these regions, contributing to local governance and defense.

The Kakazai, like other Pashtun tribes, experienced environmental and demographic pressures in their native regions of Khyber Pakhtunkhwa and eastern Afghanistan. The rugged, arid terrain limited agricultural productivity, encouraging migration in search of more fertile lands. This expansion led Kakazai clans eastward into areas such as Sindh, Punjab, and Kashmir, driven by the need for agricultural land, trade, and population pressures.

Over time, the Kakazai established themselves in fertile areas such as Sialkot, Faisalabad, Wazirabad, and parts of Lahore. These regions, known for their agricultural potential, were governed by prominent Pashtun families, including Kakazai, Burki, and Niazi clans. Despite integrating into the socio-economic fabric of these areas, the Kakazai retained elements of their Pashtun identity, preserving tribal customs, governance structures, and the code of Pashtunwali.

=== British-Raj era ===
During pre-independent British India, many Kakazai, along with Burki, and other notable Pashtun families, established settlements in the Jalandhar and Gurdaspur districts, contributing to the socio-economic development of the region. These families often engaged in trade, agriculture, and administrative roles, strengthening their presence in the area. A significant Kakazai group from Gurdaspur, East Punjab, settled in twelve villages, including Dhesian, Bahbal Chak, Faizullah Chak, Sut Kohiah (Satkoha), Wazir Chak and Shahabpur near Batala City.

The Kakazai maintained a degree of autonomy and self-governance, often adhering to the Pashtun code of Pashtunwali, even as they integrated into the local socio-political fabric. Their prominence in administrative affairs and their martial heritage allowed them to play influential roles in regional defense and governance.

At the time of the Partition of India in August 1947, Kakazai families in Gurdaspur and surrounding areas were among those profoundly affected by the upheaval and violence. Initially assured that their region would be incorporated into Pakistan, many Kakazai families prepared to remain in their ancestral villages. However, when the Radcliffe Line ultimately placed these areas within the borders of India, the Kakazai found themselves vulnerable to the communal violence that erupted during Partition. A significant number of families were displaced, with survivors relocating to regions in Pakistan, particularly in areas like Lahore, Faisalabad, Gujranwala, Kasur, Sheikhupura, Rawalpindi, and Sialkot.

Some Kakazai families that managed to stay in India continued to thrive, preserving their cultural identity while integrating into Indian society. Those who migrated to Pakistan often became part of the emerging economic and political fabric, contributing to the development of urban centers and maintaining their tribal affiliations.

=== Modern era ===
Today, the majority of the Kakazai reside in Pakistan and Afghanistan.

In Afghanistan, Kakazai populations are primarily found in Marawara District, the Barkanai and Shortan areas of Kunar, as well as parts of Laghman.

In Pakistan, Kakazai communities are dispersed across all provinces, with notable concentrations in the Dara Kakazai (Valley of Watelai, also known as Mamund Valley), and areas within the Bajaur Agency, including Lagharai, Kalozai, Kaga, Mukha, Maina, and Ghakhi, all part of Mamund Tehsil.

Additional Kakazai populations reside in urban centers and rural areas such as Peshawar, Lahore, and Abbottabad.

The Kakazai remain one of the dominant tribes in Sialkot, where they retain ownership of extensive agricultural lands. Other settlements are found in Dera Ghazi Khan, Quetta, Karachi, Kashmir, Jhelum, Bhalwal, Sargodha, Chakwal, Faisalabad, Gujrat, Isa Khel, Musa Khel, and Killi Kakazai in the Pishin District of Balochistan.

Consequently, while Kakazai Pashtuns residing in Pashto-speaking areas continue to speak Pashto, those in non-Pashto-speaking regions have experienced a linguistic shift. Despite maintaining Pashtun customs, including adherence to Pashtunwali, traditional dress, cuisine, and martial heritage, many Kakazai Pashtuns in regions such as Kabul, Punjab, Sindh, and Kashmir primarily speak indigenous languages. This linguistic adaptation reflects broader patterns observed among Pashtun communities outside Pashto-dominant areas, influenced by local integration, educational systems, administrative policies, and the limited availability of Pashto-language media in such regions.

== Sub-divisions ==
- Daulat Khel
- Khulozai
- Mahsud Khel
- Maghdud Khel
- Mahmud Khel
- Umar Khel
- Yusaf Khel

== See also ==
- List of Kakazai people
