= List of Kakazai people =

Following is a list of notable Kakazai people:

== Politics ==
- Malik Barkat Ali (1886–1946), - politician, lawyer, and journalist
- Ghulam Ahmad Bilour, - politician
- Muhammad Ali Jauhar (1878–1931), National Leader, Khilafat Movement, India, 1930s
- Aleem Khan (born 1970), politician and businessman
- H.E. Babar W. Malik, - Ambassador
- Ghulam Muhammad, - Governor General of Pakistan
- Malik Muhammad Akhtar, Ex-Federal Minister for Law and Parliamentary Affairs, Fuel, Power, and Natural Resources
- Pervaiz Rashid, - Pakistani politician

== Nuclear Scientists ==
- Dr. Nazir Ahmed (physicist), OBE - Founding Chairman, Pakistan Atomic Energy Commission, 1956-1960
- Ishfaq Ahmad, - Chairman, Pakistan Atomic Energy Commission, 1991–2001
- Munir Ahmad Khan, - Chairman, Pakistan Atomic Energy Commission, 1972–1991

== Armed Forces ==
- Akhtar Abdur Rahman
- K.M. Arif
- Zubair Mahmood Hayat
- Jehangir Karamat

== Sports ==
- Mohammad Nissar - Founding Member of Pakistan Cricket Board, First Pakistani cricketer, Pro-Pakistan leader

== Media ==
- Javed Ahmad Ghamidi (born 1951), Islamic scholar and philosopher
- Noman Ijaz, Leading Pakistani TV and Drama Actor
- Nazir Ahmed Khan, 20th-century Film Actor, Director, and Producer
- Nadeem Malik (journalist), - Senior Anchor Person of "Nadeem Malik Live," Samaa TV, Pakistan
- Abdullah Malik, - Journalist, Writer, Columnist, Historian
- Shahid Masood, - TV Personality/Journalist, Head of ARY One World Channel, currently with GEO TV and anchorman of "Meray Mutabiq"
- Faakhir Mehmood - Well-known music composer, music producer, and singer.

== Judiciary ==
- Asma Jahangir, - Pakistani human rights lawyer and social activist who co-founded and chaired the Human Rights Commission of Pakistan
- Irshad Hasan Khan - Former Chief Justice of Pakistan (2000-2002) and Chief Election Commissioner of Pakistan (2002-2005)
- Shujaat Ali Khan - Judge of Lahore High Court
- Muhammad Munir, - Chief Justice of Pakistan

== Academia ==
- K. K. Aziz, - Pakistani historian and academic.
- L. Ali Khan, - Emeritus Professor of Law, Washburn University School of Law (1983–present)
- Intisar-ul-Haque - Philosopher, Chairman, Dept. of Philosophy, University of Peshawar (1935-1996)
- Shahbaz Malik - Writer, Professor Erasmus, Punjab University, Lahore

== Government ==
- Abdul Qadir - Governor General, State Bank Of Pakistan (1953-1960)
