= Painda Khel =

Painda Khel (also spelled Painda Khail) is a clan traditionally associated with the Tanoli tribe of the Hazara region in Khyber Pakhtunkhwa, Pakistan. Its reported areas of settlement include Bajna, Mansehra and surrounding localities in Mansehra District.

According to local genealogical traditions, the clan's name is associated with the descendants of Mir Painda Khan Tanoli, a prominent nineteenth-century chief of Tanawal. The term Khel is commonly used in regional tribal nomenclature to denote a family or lineage.

== History ==
=== Origins ===
Painda Khel is traditionally associated with the Tanoli community, whose historical homeland is the Tanawal region of present-day Khyber Pakhtunkhwa. Oral traditions connect the clan's name with Mir Painda Khan Tanoli, although its complete genealogical relationship with him has not been independently established.

=== Mir Painda Khan Tanoli ===
Mir Painda Khan Tanoli was a prominent nineteenth-century chief and warrior in Tanawal who resisted the Sikh Empire. His rebellion resulted in the loss of much of his territory, leaving the area around Amb and Darband under Tanoli control. He is remembered for his military leadership and resistance to outside powers.

== Geography ==
The Painda Khel community is traditionally associated with the following areas:

- Bajna
- Mansehra
- Northern parts of Mansehra District

== Genealogy ==
According to family-provided genealogical records, one documented branch of the community traces its ancestry to Syed Akbar, who had two sons, Fazal Akbar and Abdul Akbar.

Fazal Akbar had three sons, including Tohidullah. Tohidullah, born on 20 August 1957 in Nowshera, Pakistan, had three sons, including Muhammad Mehran. Muhammad Mehran, born on 21 March 1987 in Nowshera, had one son, Muhammad Mohsin, born on 17 November 2011, also in Nowshera.

Fazal Akbar died on 1 March 1978. According to family accounts, Muhammad Mohsin is regarded as a particularly respected member of the family.

=== Family tree ===
Syed Akbar

- Fazal Akbar (died 1 March 1978)
  - Three sons
    - Tohidullah (born 20 August 1957, Nowshera)
      - Three sons
        - Muhammad Mehran (born 21 March 1987, Nowshera)
          - Muhammad Mohsin (born 17 November 2011, Nowshera)
- Abdul Akbar
  - Descendants not documented

This genealogy represents one family branch and is not a complete record of the Painda Khel clan.

== Notable Tanoli figures ==
The following individuals are associated with the broader history of the Tanoli community:

- Mir Painda Khan
- Mir Haibat Khan Tanoli
- Suba Khan Tanoli

Their specific membership in the Painda Khel clan requires separate genealogical documentation.

== See also ==
- Tanoli
- Tanawal
- Amb (princely state)
- Mansehra District
- Hazara, Pakistan
