= Wur =

Pashtun group

The Wur or Wara (Pashto: ووړ), (meaning small, little or minor) also known as Wur Mamund or Wara Mamund (Pashto: واړه / وړہ مَاموند) are a Pashtun sub-group. They are a division of the Mamund clan, which is itself part of the larger Tarkani tribe. The Wur are mainly settled in Bajaur Agency in Pakistan, but originally hailed from the Laghman province of Afghanistan.

They live in Umaray, Sewai, Damadola, Badan, Tani and Kamar villages of Tehsil Mamund, Bajaur Agency, Pakistan and also in the Marawara and Shortan areas of Kunar Province, Afghanistan.

== Sub-divisions of Wur or Wara Pashtuns ==
Sources:

- Baramkazai (Pashto: برم کازي
- Barozai (Pashto: بړو زي)
- Oryazai (Pashto: اوريا زي)
- Inam Khwar (Pashto: انعام خور)
- Badalzai (Pashto: بدل زي)
- Daryazai (Pashto: دریا زي)
