= Tarkani =

Pashtun tribe

Tarkani ترکاڼي
- Ethnicity: Pashtun
- Location: Afghanistan, Pakistan
- Parent tribe: Sarbani
- Branches: Mamund, Salarzai, Isazai, Ismailzai
- Language: Pashto
- Religion: Islam

The Tarkani (Pashto: ترکاڼي tarkāṇī) or Tarkalani (Pashto: ترکلاڼي tarkalāṇī) are a Pashtun tribe mainly settled in Bajaur District, Lower Dir District, Upper Dir District and in Kabal and Matta tehsils of Swat District in Pakistan, but originally hailed from the Laghman Province of modern-day Afghanistan. They are settled in large parts of Kunar Province of Afghanistan and other parts of Afghanistan. In Kunar Province, they are found all the way up to Nari District of Afghanistan, and are in majority in Dangam District, Asmar, half of Ghaziabad, Marawara, half of Bar Kunar District, etc. They are cousins of the Yusufzai with whom fought battles against Dilazak and Mughals.

== Sub-tribes ==
The Tarkani is split into four clans. These include:

- Mamund (descendants: Kakazai, Wur)
- Salarzai
- Isazai (descendants: Mast khel, Ali Beg khel, Musa khel, Shekh khel)
- Ismailzai (descendants: Qutab khel, Aka khel, Nura khel)

== Notable people ==
- Umra Khan, dubbed the Afghan Napoleon who captured Bajaur, Dir and other areas and fought against the British Raj in the Chitral Expedition, taking British soldiers as their Prisoners of War
- Noorena Shams, international Squash player
- Abdul Subhan Khan
- Bismillah Khan
- Shahabuddin Khan
- Sumera Shams
- Shaukatullah
- Muhammad Basheer Khan
- Hidayatullah Khan
- Hidayat Ullah
