= Battle of Ghwarah Marghah =

15th century CE South Asian military engagement

Date	1460
Location	Ghwarah Marghah, near Kabul
Result	Afghan victory

Belligerents
Yusufzai Tribe	(Timurid Empire) Timurids; Gigyani tribe

Commanders and leaders
Malak Sulaiman Shah Yusufzai	(Timurid Empire) Ulugh Beg II; Hasan ibn Changa; Shibli ibn Tory

Strength
Unknown	Unknown

Casualties and losses
300–600 killed or wounded	1,000–2,000 killed or captured

The Battle of Ghwarah Marghah (1460) was fought between the Yusufzai Afghan tribal confederacy under Malak Sulaiman Shah Yusufzai and the combined forces of Mirza Ulugh Beg and his allies from the Gigyani tribe near Kabul, Afghanistan. The battle ended in a decisive Afghan victory, temporarily reestablishing Yusufzai influence in the Kabul region and weakening Timurid control.

== Background ==
Following his defeats in Transoxiana, Mirza Ulugh Beg retreated to Kabul with a small force and sought assistance from Malak Sulaiman Shah Yusufzai to recover lost Timurid territories, including Kabul and Ghazni. Sulaiman Shah offered military and political support, effectively governing Kabul as Ulugh Beg’s de facto prime minister. Over time, the Yusufzai malaks gained significant power, creating tension with the Timurid administration.

Ulugh Beg, aiming to reduce Yusufzai dominance, exploited rivalries between the Yusufzai and the Gigyani tribe. Aligning himself with the Gigyanis, he provoked open conflict between the two Afghan factions, fragmenting the emerging tribal confederacy in the Kabul region.

== Battle ==
The Timurid–Gigyani alliance marched on the Yusufzai and their allies including the Muhammadzai, Khalil, and Gadoon tribes at Ghwarah Marghah. The Yusufzai suffered initial losses and were scattered, but they regrouped and launched a counteroffensive that broke the opposing line. Ulugh Beg’s army and Gigyani allies were routed with heavy casualties. The Yusufzai’s lost around 300-600 while the Timurids lost around 1,000-2,000

== Aftermath ==
Defeated and isolated, Ulugh Beg sued for peace with Sulaiman Shah, who accepted a temporary settlement in hopes of restoring Afghan unity. The victory strengthened Yusufzai influence around Kabul and inspired renewed calls for a united Afghan confederacy. However, Ulugh Beg later sought revenge through political deception, culminating in the Massacre of Yusufzai Malaks, where hundreds of tribal leaders were killed at a supposed peace feast.
