= Dir Levies =

Pakistani paramilitary gendarmerie

- Active: Present
- Country: Pakistan
- Allegiance: Khyber Pakhtunkhwa
- Type: Paramilitary force Gendarmerie
- Role: Law enforcement

The Dir Levies is a paramilitary force in the Dir region of the Pakistani province of Khyber Pakhtunkhwa. It operates as the primary law enforcement agency tasked with maintaining law and order within the division. The force has its origins back in the days of the British Raj, and has continued to function for over a century.

== History ==
In 1895 after the British conquered Swat, Dir, Chitral, Bajawar, and Malakand, a collective force was established as the Swat Levies, which included therein the Dir Levies, Chitral Border Police and the previously raised Malakand Levies. Maj. A.H. Dean who was the first Political Agent of Malakand was assigned the task to command the Swat Levies. The force would have to take care of Swat, Dir, Chitral and Malakand areas. In the first batch, a total of 192 personnel were recruited as sepoys. The first Jamadar of the Swat Levies was Mohammad Akram Khan son of Said Anwar Khan of Timergara, Dir District. By March 1896, the Levies had a strength of 390 men including 40 non-commissioned officers. The number hovered around 300 men into the early 20th century.

Political agents and district coordination officers act as commandants of Levies forces within their respective jurisdictions.

== Organization ==
The Dir Levies comes under the administrative control of SAFRON Division, Government of Pakistan. The Commandant of Dir Levies is the commanding officer of the force while the Subedar Major is the second high-ranking officer after the commandant.

== See also ==
- Law enforcement in Pakistan
