= Abdul Subhan Khan =

Pakistani politician

- Nawab of Khar
- Reign: 1935-1990
- Born: Khar, North-West Frontier Province, British India
- Died: 1991; Khar, Federally Administered Tribal Areas, Pakistan
- House: Tarkani

Abdus Subhan Khan (Pashto: عبدالصبحان خان) was the Nawab of Khar in the Bajaur Agency from 1935 to 1990. Khan is known for his involvement in the Bajaur Campaign, in which he rallied tribesmen in the Bajaur Agency to repel an invasion by the Royal Afghan Army in 1961.

== Biography ==
Khan ascended as the Nawab of Khar in 1935, which gave him domestic control over the Bajaur Agency of the North-West Frontier Province. In 1947, Bajaur acceded to the newly-independent state of Pakistan.

In September 1960, Afghan army personnel and irregular forces began raids into Bajaur, which was then a part of the Federally Administered Tribal Areas, and began clashing with Khan's forces. Due to the intensity of the clashes, Khan requested assistance from the Pakistani Government, which resulted in Pakistani President Ayub Khan's formation of the Bajaur Scouts to repel the Afghan invasion. After the repulsion of the Afghans by September 1961, regular forces of the Pakistan Army were placed in Bajaur to ensure stability; however, local protests and ambushes on these personnel forced the government to withdraw the army presence.

During his reign, Khan sponsored several development initiatives in Bajaur, such as the creation of a new football ground in Khar for locals. Khan served as Nawab until 1990.

== Death ==
Khan in died in Khar, in 1991.
