= Ulugh Beg II =

Ulugh Beg Mirza II

Timurid ruler of Kabul and Ghazni
- Reign: 1461–1502
- Successor: Abdur Razaq Mirza
- Died: 1502
- Burial: Abdur Razaq Mausoleum, Ghazni
- Issue: Abdur Razaq Mirza; Miran Shah Mirza; Biki Begum; Bibi Zarif
Names
- Mughith-ud-din Ulugh Beg Mirza II
- Dynasty: Timurid
- Father: Abu Sa'id Mirza

Ulugh Beg II also known as Ulugh Beg Kabuli (d.1502) was the Timurid ruler of Kabul and Ghazni from 1461 to 1502.

== Reign ==
Born the fourth son of the Timurid Sultan Abu Sa'id Mirza, Ulugh Beg was given the cities of Kabul and Ghazni by his father, governing first as a prince and then, after Abu Sa'id's death, as an independent monarch. His elder brothers, Ahmad Mirza and Mahmud Mirza, were given the rule of Samarqand and Badakhshan respectively, while another brother, Umar Shaikh Mirza, received Farghana. The latter became the father of Babur, who later founded the Mughal Empire.

Ulugh Beg had a long and stable reign, during which Kabul became a cultural centre. The discovery of a number of books from his library, including a copy of the Shahnameh, confirms the activity of a royal scriptorium during his reign. The elaborate frontispiece of one manuscript suggests that illuminators, calligraphers, and possibly painters were attached to Ulugh Beg's court. He also had a love of gardens, which was noted by his nephew Babur who had inherited this trait. The names of some of those he had commissioned have been recorded, such as the Bagh-e Behesht (Garden of Paradise) and the Bostan-Sara (Home of Orchards).

During his reign, the Pashtun Yusufzai tribe first arrived in Kabul. Some traditions state that the group had lent their support to Ulugh Beg, who in turn highly favoured them. However, during the last quarter of the 15th century, relations between the tribe and the ruler became strained. Eventually, with the assistance of the Gigyani tribe, Ulugh Beg allegedly had many of the tribal leaders assassinated. Orientalist Annette Beveridge records the following story regarding Ulugh Beg and the head of the Yusufzai, Malik Sulaiman:

One day a wise man of the tribe, Shaikh Usman saw Sulaiman sitting with the young Mirza (Ulugh Beg) on his knee and warned him that the boy had the eyes of Yazid and would destroy him and his family as Yazid had destroyed that of the Prophet. Sulaiman paid him no attention and gave the Mirza his daughter in marriage. Subsequently, the Mirza, having invited the Yusufzai to Kabul, treacherously killed Sulaiman and 700 of his followers. They were killed at the place called Siyah-sang near Kabul; it is still known as the Grave of the Martyrs. Their tombs are revered and that of Shaikh Usman in particular.

Alternatively, another account states that after the Yusufzais migrated to Kabul, they resorted to banditry alongside a number of other tribes. This reached such an extent that Ulugh Beg subsequently had the group expelled from the region.

== Death and succession ==
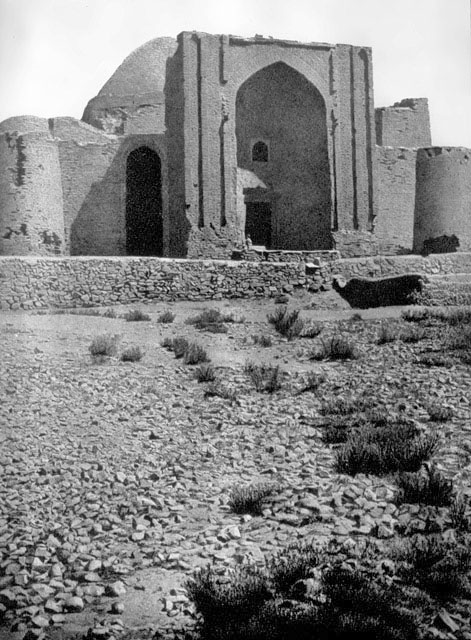
Abdur Razaq Mausoleum, c. 1924

Ulugh Beg died in 1502 and was likely buried in the Abdur Razaq Mausoleum in Ghazni. Though the tomb is named for his son, Abdur Razaq's short reign of only a year makes it unlikely that he had the opportunity to order its construction. It is instead more probable that the tomb was originally built by Ulugh Beg for his own use, with Abdur Razaq being interred in it later.

Abdur Razaq, who was still in his minority at the time of his father's death, was quickly usurped by one of his ministers. A tumultuous period followed, which only ended with Muhammad Mukim Arghun, Ulugh Beg's son-in-law, taking control of Kabul. Finally, Ulugh Beg's nephew Babur, seeing Mukim as a usurper, drove out the latter and captured the city for himself in 1504, pensioning off his cousin Abdur Razaq with an estate. It was from here that Babur later launched his invasion of the Indian subcontinent.

== Issue ==
- Abdur Razaq Mirza (d.1509) – briefly ruler of Kabul
- Miran Shah Mirza
- Biki Begum – married Muhammad Ma'asum Mirza, son of Sultan Husayn Bayqara of Herat
- Kabuli Begum - married first Badi' al-Zaman Mirza, married second Qambar Mirza Kukaltash
- Bibi Zarif – married Muhammad Mukim Arghun

== See also ==
- Battle of Ghwarah Marghah'
