= Mamund =

Pashtun clan

The Mamund (or Mamond) ( Pashto: ماموند) is a Pashtun clan which is a part of the larger Tarkani tribe. The clan is located principally in the Watelai Valley (also known as Mamund Valley), Bajaur, but also owns villages on both sides of the Durand Line. Villages of Mamund Valley that lie on Durand line from Bajaur's side are (,کګه, مڼو ځنګل وادي ګبرے, کټکوټ, غاخے, نختر کلے)Majority of the Mamund Pashtuns live in Mamund Tehsil, Loi Mamund Tehsil and Wara Mamund Tehsil, Bajaur, Khyber Pukhtunkhwa, Pakistan and in Marawara, Asadabad, Shigal, Watapur and Ghazi Abad Districts of Kunar Province in Afghanistan.

The Mamund clan is split into two divisions: Kakazai (Loi Mamund) and Wur (Wara Mamund).
