= Dobandi =

Village in Khyber-Pakhtunkhwa, Pakistan

Coordinates: 34°2′0″N 72°56′0″E

Dobandi is a village of Haripur District in Khyber-Pakhtunkhwa, Pakistan, it is located at 34°2'0N 72°56'0E with an altitude of 490 metres (1610 feet).
