= Tanawal =

Tanawal may refer to:

- Amb (princely state), a princely state that governed an area also known as Tanawal
- Lower Tanawal Tehsil, an administrative subdivision of Abbottabad District
- Tanawal Tehsil, an administrative subdivision of Mansehra District
