= Lagharai =

- Town
- Country: Pakistan
- Region: Federally Administered Tribal Areas
- District: Bajaur Agency
- Tehsil: Mamund

Population (2017)
  - Total: 592
- Time zone: UTC+5 (PST)
  - Summer (DST): UTC+6 (PDT)

Lagharai is a town in Mamund Tehsil, Bajaur Agency, Federally Administered Tribal Areas, Pakistan. The population is 592 according to the 2017 census.
