= Noorena Shams =

Pakistani sportsperson

Personal information
- Native name: Noorena Shams Ul Qamar Khan ShahiKhel Tarkani
- Nationality: Pakistani
- Citizenship: Pakistani
- Born: June 18, 1997 (age 29) Timergara, Lower Dir District, Pakistan
- Home town: Jandhool, Lower Dir
- Education: Economics and Management University of London, Real Estate and Finance London School of Economics; Frontier Corps Public Schools Dir, Beaconhouse School System, Roots Millennium Schools, Edwardes College Peshawar, New York University Tandon School of Engineering, University of London, London School of Economics
- Years active: 2008

Sport
- Country: Pakistan
- Sport: Cycling, Cricket, Squash
- Turned pro: 2016
- Coached by: Adil Atlas Khan, Amir Wagih, Hadrian Stiff

Achievements and titles
- Highest world ranking: 120

Noorena Shams (born 18 June 1997) is a Pakistani sportsperson. She is a professional squash player, a cyclist, and a cricketer.

== Early life ==
Shams was born on 18 June 1997 in Timergara, Lower Dir District, Pakistan. She raised the money to buy her first squash racket and shoes by selling her cartoons to a local newspaper. She lived in Lower Dir with her mother during the insurgency in Northwest Pakistan, and her house was struck twice. Due to the cultural restrictions on women to play sports, Noreena Shams disguised his identity and pretended to be a boy to play cricket. At that time, she was 15 years old. She played for a whole year on the national junior team and then ended up in the girls’ team when her identity was revealed. She played for a short while on the cricket team before moving on to squash.

== Sportswoman ==
Shams has been a sportsperson since 2008. She was the first ever cyclist to win a silver medal for Pakistan in the Junior Olympics. Shams has played different sports and has won 63 gold medals, 24 silver medals and 5 bronze medals. As a squash player, Shams has been among the Top 40 Asian Junior Squash Players, and is currently ranked 209 in the world. She is currently World Number 212 by the Professional Squash Association. She has been coached by Munawar Zaman, Shahzad Mohibullah Khan, Adil Khan and Tariq Khan.

Shams won silver medal in cycling at the Junior Olympics and is the youngest South Asian to do so.

== Activism ==
Shams was listed among the 100 Inspirational Women by Paparazzi Magazine in 2016. She was on the list of 50 Influential Ladies of Pakistan in 2016 and was listed among the 24 Inspirational Figures of Pakistan in 2016 by the UNDP. She was also featured in the “BEAT ME” video by UNWOMEN, and was awarded with a Government Pendent of Recognition in 2016. Shams works against harassment in sports and against harassment of female Muslim athletes around the world. She delivered a TEDxTalk in 2016. Shams received the Gul Jee Art Award several times. She is a 3-time All Pakistan debating champion. She has credited her father as her inspiration for debating, however she has not competed in debating since 2014. Shams was also invited by Malala Fund to address the UN Commission on the Status of Women in 2017, focusing on women’s economic empowerment.
