= Nawabzada Shahabuddin Khan =

Khan of Jandool, Pakistan (1932–2007)

- شہاب الدین خان
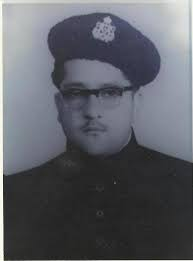
- A Young Shahhabuddin Khan

Last Khan of Jandol State
- In office 1947–1969

Nawabzada Muhammad Shahabuddin Khan (Urdu: شہاب الدین خان) was the last Khan of Jandol, a princely state that is now part of Lower Dir District, Pakistan from 1947 to 1969. He is remembered for building schools, hospitals, forts and roads but also for his absolute rule over the region, which ended when Pakistan took control of Dir after local unrest.

== Life ==
He was the second son of Nawab of Dir Sir Nawab Shah Jahan Khan. After Partition in 1947 Nawab Shah Jehan made his three sons rulers of different parts of the state; Nawabzada Shahabuddin Khan governing Munda and Samar Bagh (Jandool), presently Lower Dir.
