= Shawal Rifles =

Pakistani paramilitary force

- Founded: September 1972
- Country: Pakistan
- Branch: Civil Armed Forces
- Size: 2 Wings
- Part of: Frontier Corps Khyber Pakhtunkhwa (South)
- Regimental centre: Razmak

Commanders
- Commandant: Colonel Tayyab

The Shawal Rifles is a paramilitary regiment, forming part of the Pakistani Frontier Corps Khyber Pakhtunkhwa (North). The Rifles are tasked with defending the border with Afghanistan and assisting with law enforcement in the districts adjacent to the border. The regiment had a 2020/21 budget of Rs. 1.85 billion.

== History ==
The regiment was raised in 1972 as the North West Waziristan Scouts but this was changed to the shorter current title. The name alludes to the Shawal Valley in North Waziristan. In August 1973 the regiment was posted to the abandoned Razmak Camp, and work was carried out to restore the military base.

In the early 21st century, the Rifles have been involved in anti-drugs operations. In 2011-2012, the unit received a number of drug testing kits to assist in their work against drug smuggling.

In October 2017 a vehicle of the regiment was attacked in Razmak, resulting in the deaths of three personnel and injuries to a further seven.

== Units ==
- Headquarters Wing
- 195 Wing
- 196 Wing
