= Dir (princely state) =

Princely state of British India and later Pakistan

Dir state ریاست دیر
- c. 1600–28 July 1969
- Flag

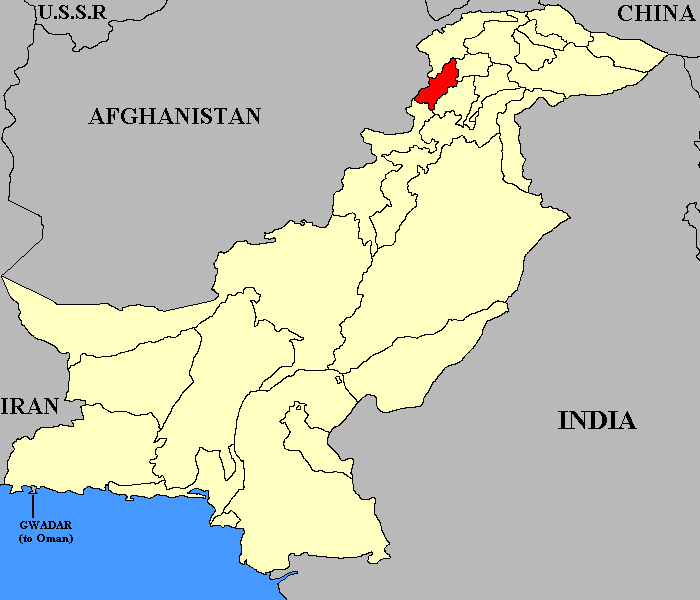
- Dir (highlighted red) shown within the former exclave of West Pakistan
- Status: Independent Kingdom (c. 1600–1897); Princely state under British Raj (1897–1947); Princely state of Pakistan (1947–1969)
- Capital: Dir
- Common languages: Pashto
- Religion: Islam
- Government: Absolute Monarchy
- Khan
  - 1626-1676: Akhund Baba (Mulla Ilyas Khan) (first)
  - 1960-1969: Nawabzada Shahabuddin Khan(last)
- History
  - Established: c. 1600
  - Chitral Expedition: 1895
  - Acceded to Pakistan: 8 February 1948
  - Dir campaign: 1959–1960
  - Disestablished: 28 July 1969

Area
  - Total: 5,282 km^{2} (2,039 sq mi)
Succeeded by
Dominion of Pakistan
- Today part of: Pakistan; Khyber Pakhtunkhwa

Dir was a princely state in a subsidiary alliance with the British Raj, located within the North-West Frontier Province. Following the partition of British India, Dir remained independent and unaligned until February 1948, when the Dominion of Pakistan accepted its accession.

The princely state ceased to exist as a distinct political entity in 1969, when it was fully incorporated into Pakistan. The territory it once covered is today located in the Pakistani province of Khyber Pakhtunkhwa, forming two northern and southern districts called Upper Dir and Lower Dir, respectively.

== Geography ==
Most of the state lay in the Panjkora Valley, which is traversed by Panjkora River originating in the Hindu Kush mountains and joining the Swat River near Chakdara. Apart from small areas in the south-west, Dir is a rugged, mountainous zone with peaks rising to 5,000 metres (16,000 ft) in the north-east and to 3,000 metres (9,800 ft) along the watersheds, with Swat to the east and Afghanistan and Chitral to the west and north.

== History ==
=== Early period ===
Dir took its name from its main settlement, Dir, the location of the ruler's palace.

The territories surrounding Dir were populated by their present ethnic majority, the Pashtuns, beginning from the end of the 14th century. The Pashtuns were divided in several clans (khels), often battling one against the other. The three clans which conquered the zone were the Yusufzai (Painda Khel, Sultan Khel, Osakhel, Nasirdinkhel), and Tarkanrai. The Dir territory was populated in the 16th century by the Malizai sub-tribe of the Yusufzai, who took control of the zone assimilating or chasing away the previous inhabitants (Dilazak in Bajour, Jandol, Maiden, and Swatis from areas east of the Panjkora) and within this tribe the most prominent factions became the Painda khel and Sultan khel.

By the 17th century a section of the Painda khel, coming from the Kohan village in the valley of Nihag (a Panjkora tributary), seized the trade routes with Chitral and Afghanistan.

=== Ruling Khans ===
The Khanate is said to have been established in the 17th century by Painda khel leader and charismatic mystic figure Akhund Ilyas Khan (Baba), who founded the State of Dir. His descendants took the name Akhund khel, preserving and expanding their leadership becoming the Khans of Dir.

=== Jandol rule and fort ===
Umra Khan took power while killing his brother inside the fort and succeeded as the Khan of Jandol State. The large building inside the fort was built in 1960 by Nawabzada Shahabuddin Khan (known as Jandool Khan), the son of Shah Jehan Khan (the then Nawab of Dir). The fort is located strategically controlling the four directions with the bordering area of Bajaur, which borders Afghanistan.

In 1881 the ruler of Dir, Muhammad Sharif Khan, was chased away by Khan Umara Khan of Jandool, who conquered Dir, Swat, and the Malakand area. In 1895, however, while the forces of Umara Khan were besieging a British Force near Malakand, Muhammad Sharif Khan decided to make his soldiers join the British Relief Force coming in aid, the Chitral Expedition. During that expedition, Sharif Khan made an agreement with the British Government to keep the road to Chitral open in return for a subsidy. The British eventually won the war and exiled Umara Khan as part of the dual game by British with Umara Khan. This was as a reward for Sharif Khan's help, Sharif Khan was given the whole of Dir and also the lower Swat (the latter territory would be lost in 1917 to the Wali of Swat).

=== The ruling Nawabs ===
The hereditary Nawab Khan Bahadur title was granted in 1897 to Mohammad Sharif Khan and inherited by Sharif's eldest son, Aurangzeb Badshah Khan (nicknamed as Charha Nawab), who ruled between 1904 and 1925. In 1906 his younger brother, Miangul Jan (Munda Khan), tried in vain to wrest power with the assistance of the Khan of Barwa, Sayed Ahmad Khan, a former ally of Mohammad Sharif. A second attempt in 1913 was successful, but for a very short time, as in 1914 Aurangzeb regained the rule over Dir. Also, the other son of Mohammad Sharif, Mohammad Isa Khan, attempted around 1915 to seize the Dir throne by allying with the Khan of Barwa, but Aurangzeb managed to preserve his rule.

At Aurangzeb's death, in 1925, the title passed to his eldest son, Mohammad Shah Jahan Khan, who was supported by the British Government against the small rival faction that favored his brother Alamzeb Khan. Alamzeb was exiled in 1928 because of his attempts to take power. Shah Jahan Khan was loyal to the British, who nominated him to KBE in 1933.

After the 1947 partition of British India and the independence of Pakistan and India, Jahan Khan sent his troops to support Pakistan during the First Kashmir War. The troops were involved with the attack on Mirpur in November 1947. Khan signed an instrument of accession to Pakistan on 8 November 1947. But it was not until 8 February 1948 that the state's accession was accepted by Jinnah as Governor-General. Jahan Khan also nominated his son Muhammad Shah Khan Khusro as successor and other sons (Shahabuddin Khan and Mohammad Shah) governors of different provinces.

=== Pakistan ===
On 8 February 1948, Dir acceded to the newly created Muslim dominion of Pakistan, initially continuing as one of the surviving princely states of Pakistan. The politics of the late Nawabs are described as reactionary and harsh. The Italian anthropologist Fosco Maraini, who visited the state in 1959 during an expedition towards Hindu-Kush, reported the opinion of the people that the Nawab Jahan Khan (who was about 64 years old at that time) was a tyrannical leader, denying his subjects any freedom of speech and instruction, governing the land with a number of henchmen, and seizing for his harem any girl or woman he wanted. Maraini also noticed the lack of schools, sewers, and paved roads, and the presence of just a rudimentary newly built hospital. The Nawab was negatively compared to the Wali of the adjacent Swat, whose liberal politics allowed his state to enter into the modern era.

As a consequence, uprisings began eventually to explode. A repressed revolt in 1959 is reported in Maraini's account. Another insurrection in 1960 led to the death of 200 soldiers and put the Nawab in a bad light in the view of the press. General Yahya decided to exile Jahan Khan, who would die in 1968. His throne passed in October 1961 to his eldest son, Mohammad Shah Khosru Khan, educated in India and a serving Major General of the Pakistan Army. However, the effective rule of Dir was taken by the Pakistan government's Political Agent.

A few years later, on 28 July 1969, the Dir state was incorporated into Pakistan, ceasing its political existence. The royal status of the Nawabs was abolished in 1972, at the same time as most other princes of Pakistan.

== List of rulers ==
The information for the following table stems from Who's Who in the Dir, Swat, and Chitral Agency, Encyclopædia Britannica and accounts by local people dating back to the 17th century.

Tenure	Ruler
1626–1676	Akhund Baba (Mulla Ilyas Khan)
1676–1752	Mulla Ismail
1752–1804	Ghulam Khan Baba
1804–1814	Khan Zafar Khan
1814–1822	Khan Qasim Khan
1822–1868	Khan Ghazzan Khan
1868–1870	Ghasan Khan
1870–1884	Khan Rahmat Allah (Rahmatullah) Khan
1886–1890	Mohammad Sharif Khan
1890–1895	Mohammad Umara Khan
1895–1904	Nawab Mohammad Sharif Khan
1904–1913	Nawab Awrangzeb Badshah Khan (first time)
1913–1914	Nawab Miangul Jan
1914–1925	Nawab Awrangzeb Badshah Khan (second time)
1925–1947	Nawab Mohammad Shah Jahan Khan
1947–1960	Nawabzada Shahabuddin Khan
1960–Incumbent	Nawab Khosru Khan

== Demographics ==
The population of the state in 1911 amounted to about 100,000 people according to Encyclopædia Britannica, rising to 250,000 in 1931 and falling back to 107,000 in 1951.

At the time of 1947 partition of India, there was a Muslim majority in Dir with small minorities of Hindus and Sikhs, many of whom left for India during partition.

== Flag ==
The state flag contained several Islamic symbols and three sentences: the top writing is the Bismillah: "In the name of God, the Most Gracious, the Most Merciful", the center one is the shahada in the Urdu language: "There is no god but God, Muhammad is the messenger of God". The bottom phrase reads "with the help of God, victory is near" in the Arabic language. The flag also had a red variant with the same drawings.

== See also ==
- Princely states of Pakistan

== External links and Sources ==
- Government of Khyber Pakhtunkhwa
