= Dilazak =

Pashtun tribe

Dilazak (Pashto: دیلازک) is a Pashtun tribe from the Karlani confederation of Pashtuns.

== History ==
The Dilazak Pashtuns are believed to have first settled the regions across the Khyber Pass in the 11th century, from the areas of Bajaur to the Peshawar Valley with Sultan Mahmud of Ghazni, and a large contingent of Dilazaks joined Sultan Mahmud for his expedition against Somnath.

The natives were written to be red-complexioned "kafirs" and were displaced or left due to subjection by the Dilazaks, who after conquering the region drove out the natives away into the mountain retreats of the neighbouring valleys.

Around 1520, another Pashtun tribe, the Yousafzai, was expelled from Kabul by Mirza Ulugh Beg, a Timurid. The Yusufzai migrated to Peshawar Valley where they sought and received help from the Dilazaks. Later, the relationships between the two tribes deteriorated and a long war ensued. 20 years later, at the battle of Katlang, the Yousafzai and Allied forces pushed the Dilazak east of the Indus River under the leadership of Malik Ahmad Khan.
