= Jandol State =

Pashtun Islamic princely state of the British Raj and later Pakistan

Jandol (also called Jandool or Jandul) was a minor Pashtun princely state at the time of the British Raj. It was established circa 1830, with its capital at Barwa (modern Samarbagh). Umra Khan was probably its most prominent ruler. It became a part of the princely state of Dir and later of Pakistan as a result of the integration of the princely states of Pakistan.

Jandol State Flag

== Khans ==
The Khans include:

- 1791-1820: Hayat Khan
- 1820-?: Abdul Ghafar Khan
- ?-?: Faiz Talab Khan
- ?-1879: Aman Khan
- 1879-1881: Muhammad Zaman Khan
- 1881- c.1904: Umra Khan
- 1947-1969: Nawabzada Shahabuddin Khan
