= Gigyani =

Pashtun tribe

Gigyani/Gagyani ګيګياڼيی
Regions with significant populations
- Primarily Pakistan and Afghanistan

Languages
- Pashto (Native)

Religion
- Islam (Sunni Hanafi)

Gigyani (Pashto: ګيګياڼيی) a tribe of Pashtuns who live in Afghanistan and Pakistan.
