= Talash Tehsil =

Talash Tehsil تحصیل تالاش تیمرګره تالاش
- Tehsil
- Country: Pakistan
- Province: Khyber Pakhtunkhwa
- District: Lower Dir
- Time zone: UTC+5 (PST)

Talash Tehsil (Pashto/Urdu: تالاش) is a valley and subdivisional headquarters in Lower Dir District, Khyber Pakhtunkhwa, Pakistan. It is located along the Panjkora River valley, approximately 20 km from Chakdara and 21 km from the district headquarters, Timergara. The main town, known as Ziarat Talash, serves as the central bazaar and administrative centre for the surrounding area.

== History ==
The area of Talash has historically been part of the broader Dir region, which was a princely state until its merger with Pakistan in 1969. Lower Dir District was formed in 1996 when the former Dir District was divided into Upper and Lower Dir.

In December 2022, the Khyber Pakhtunkhwa government notified the creation of a new tehsil named Talash, comprising 20 village councils and four union councils (Noorakhel, Shahikhel, Dushkhel, and Bandagai), based on the 2017 census boundaries. This decision fulfilled a longstanding local demand and was announced by the then Chief Minister Mahmood Khan.

However, in January 2025, local political and social activists continued to demand the full declaration and operationalisation of Talash as a separate tehsil, as the 2022 notification had not been fully implemented. In November 2025 CM Khyber Pakhtunkhwa Sohail Afridi re-announces establishment of Tehsil Talash which is now one of the seven tehsils of Lower Dir, which are Adenzai, Balambat, Khal, Lal Qilla, Munda, Samar Bagh, and Timergara.
