= Muhammad Sherin =

Islamic scholar of Qadiriyya Chishti Silsila

Muhammad Sherin (Pashto:محمد شیرین), also known as Marghuzar Babaji, was a Sufi Pir and Islamic scholar of the Qadiriyya and Chishti orders.

He was born in 1933 in Talash, Dir to Ghulam Muhammad. His grandfather Hasan Khan was the disciple of Akhund of Swat. He remained the disciple of Abdul Hadi (Shah Mansur), Maulana Khan Bahadar (Martung Babaji), Maulana Sirajul Yum (Gharai Babaji), Maulana Zardad Babaji (Mingora) and Maulana Rahimullah (Mingora). Later in life, Sherin had two daughters.

Muhanmmad Sherin stayed in the cave of Akhund of Swat near the town Marghuzar, a cave where Saidu Baba used to stay and pray, for nearly 17 years. He settled in a mosque near Marghuzar where large numbers of his disciples visited him and received spiritual education.

Muhammad Sherin performed Hajj four times, as well as several Umrahs. He also visited the tombs of Tamim al-Ansari and Jubair. Before sitting in a Chillah he used to work as labour in the construction roads in Swat. He visited India with his brothers to earn their livelihood, and visited Afghanistan in 1997 where he called on religious scholars.

== See also ==
Akhund of Swat
