= Kabalgram =

Village in Shangla District, Khyber Pakhtunkhwa, Pakistan

Kabalgram or Kabal Gram (Urdu: کابلگرام) is a village with the largest population in Martung Tehsil of Shangla District, Khyber Pakhtunkhwa province Pakistan. It is situated on the extreme right bank of River Indus and is south-east to Kuzkalai, the central village of Martung. River Indus is the boundary of Shangla with Tor-Ghar District of Hazara division.

Kabalgram is relatively at lower altitude (around 510 metres above mean sea level) compared to the rest of Martung and it remains quite hot in summer at Kabalgram. Being very near to Martung, Kabalgram is very similar to Martung in almost all aspects. The community of Kabalgram is however more similar to that of Tor-Ghar and hence have their peculiar traditions. Most of them belong to Akhunkhel and Nasratkhel who are the sub-sects of Yousafzai and Shamshikhel of Gunangar is a MandarnYousafzai tribe of Pathans.

River Indus is the life line of Kabalgram, though there does not exist any proper irrigation system. Some small canals have been built by the local formers to their fields wherever possible. Most of the people use river water directly for drinking and household using or use the underground water. The water table in Kabalgram is within a few meters because of River Indus.

Kabalgram did not have any road link with any part of the tehsil or elsewhere till 2002. A jeep track was built by the local people on their own expenses from Kabalgram to the central Martung, from where they can have access to Mingora or Buner. Kabalgram people have been using River Indus as means of communication (traveling and cargo) in summer with the nearby town Darband of Mansehra district since Tarbela Dam was built.

Kabalgram is split mainly in two towns namely Bar-Kabalgram (or simply Kabalgram) and Kuzkabalgram. Kuzkabalgram is at about 2 kilometers in south-east from Barkabalgram and is famous for the shrine of Akhunbaba (Akunbaba Ziarat), the religious scholar and reformer of eighteenth century. Akhunbaba descendants live in Harrori Khakoo village of Mansehra district.

All of the people of Kabalgram are Sunni Muslims, and are comparatively more hardliners. Maulana Waliullah of Kabalgram has been the active member of the Sufi Muhammad group of Taliban and has led many movements for them. In April and May 2009, his relationships with the well-known terrorist of Swat, Maulana Fazlullah and his group were noticed and some were even reported in media. After being fully exposed, Waliullah probably felt threat to his life from the army and the anti Taliban people in the area. He thus surrendered himself to the security forces when they arrived in Martung. It is believed that Maulana Waliullah, before surrendering to the security forces, had been providing shelter and a way of escape to those Taliban who succeeded to reach Kabalgram from Buner via Martung. Pakistan army released him in July 2010 but re-arrested him after a few days. He remained in the custody of the army until his death on December 7, 2010.
