= Harrori Khakoo =

KHAKHOO Harrori includes three revenue estates (locally called mauzas) in Mansehra district, Khyber Pakhtunkhwa (KPK) province, Pakistan. It is inhabited (mostly) by a single tribe and is governed by its own village council.

== Geography ==
Khakoo Harrori is about two miles west of the town of Battal. Battal is about 30 miles north from Mansehra city on N35/AH4 Karakoram Highway. Khakoo Harrori includes three revenue estates locally called mauzas (Khakhoo, Harrori upper and Harrori lower) and seven hamlets (Shingrehta, Chandni, Danna, Bakrian, Mayra, Nian Sukh, and Bhati). It is grouped into five wards: Ward 1 is Harrori upper, Ward 2 is Harrori lower–Mayra, Ward 3 is Khakoo–Nian Sukh, Ward 4 is Shingrehta–Bakrian–Chandni–Danna, and Ward 5 is Bhati–Gali. The 2013 local government act of KPK defines a village as an integrated and contiguous habitation commonly identified by a name, and on the basis of this definition, Harrori Khakoo is classified as a village. It is also one of the sites affected by the 2005 Kashmir earthquake.

== Governance ==
Khakoo Harori village is governed by the Khakoo Harori village council. The village council is one of 175 village councils of Mansehra district, KPK province, Pakistan. The village council is an administrative unit of Khyber Pukhtoon Khwa (KPK) province. The village council consists of two women members who are elected on women reserved seats, one peasant member who is elected on a peasant reserved seat and five other members who are elected on general seats. The member on a general seat that scores the highest number of votes in the local body election becomes the chief executive (nazim in the local language). The member on a general seat that receives the second highest number of votes becomes assistant chief executive (naib nazim in the local language). The nazim (chief executive) has the executive authority.

== Demographics ==
The residents of this village are mostly members of a single tribe, the Akhun Kheil. They are said to be progeny of a single person, Sayyed Akbar Shah, also known as Akhun Salak Baba. Akhun Salak Baba is buried in Akhun Salak Baba Cemetery, about 0.5 miles south of lower Kabalgram village, on the west bank of the Indus river and north bank of the Itai Khwar (river). Akhun Salak Baba was very famous for his leadership and religious knowledge and piety and was given the title of Akhun Salak by the public, and therefore the cemetery was named Akhun Salak Baba cemetery. Many people visit his cemetery each year. There are other tribes like the Awan, and Turks are also part of the village council.
