= Martung =

Martung Tehsil تحصیل مارتونگ مارتونګ تحصیل
- Tehsil and village
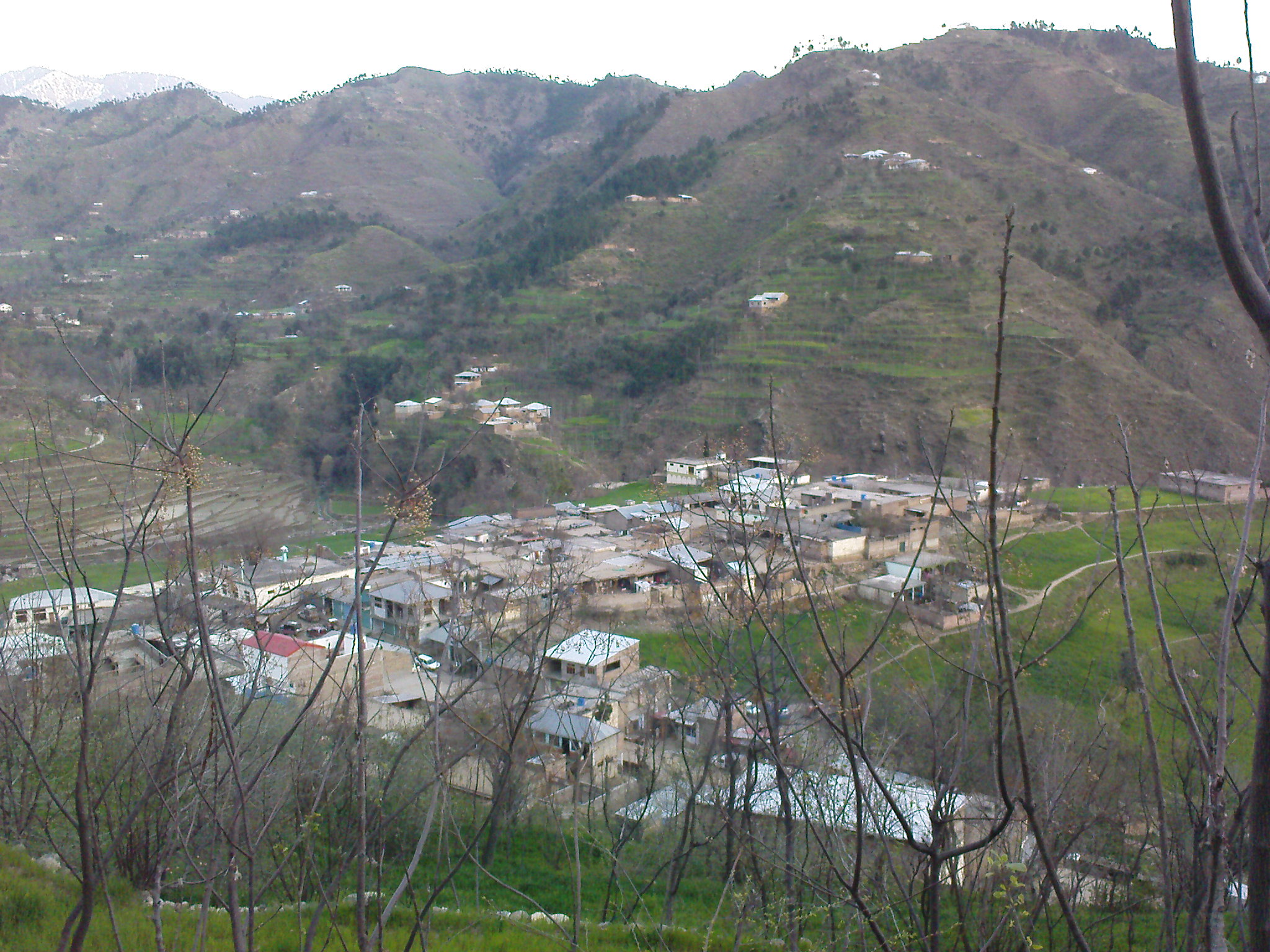

- Location within Pakistan
- Coordinates: 34°40′44″N 72°44′42″E
- Country: Pakistan
- Province: Khyber Pakhtunkhwa
- District: Shangla District

Martung, Mārtung or Martoong (Urdu: مارتونگ) is a highland village and tehsil of Shangla District, Khyber Pakhtunkhwa, Pakistan included in Puran Subdivision. Central Martung (Koozkalai) is 982 m above sea level., Being hilly area, some parts of Martung are even more than 1800 m above mean sea level. Alogai is a place with scattered population in Martung having an altitude of 1641 meters. Martung is a green valley situated in the south-east of Shangla District, about 5 km north-west from River Indus. Major villages of the sub tehsil include Kabalgram, Pishlor, Titwalan, Koozkalai, Manzkalai, Shaga and Karindara.

== Name ==
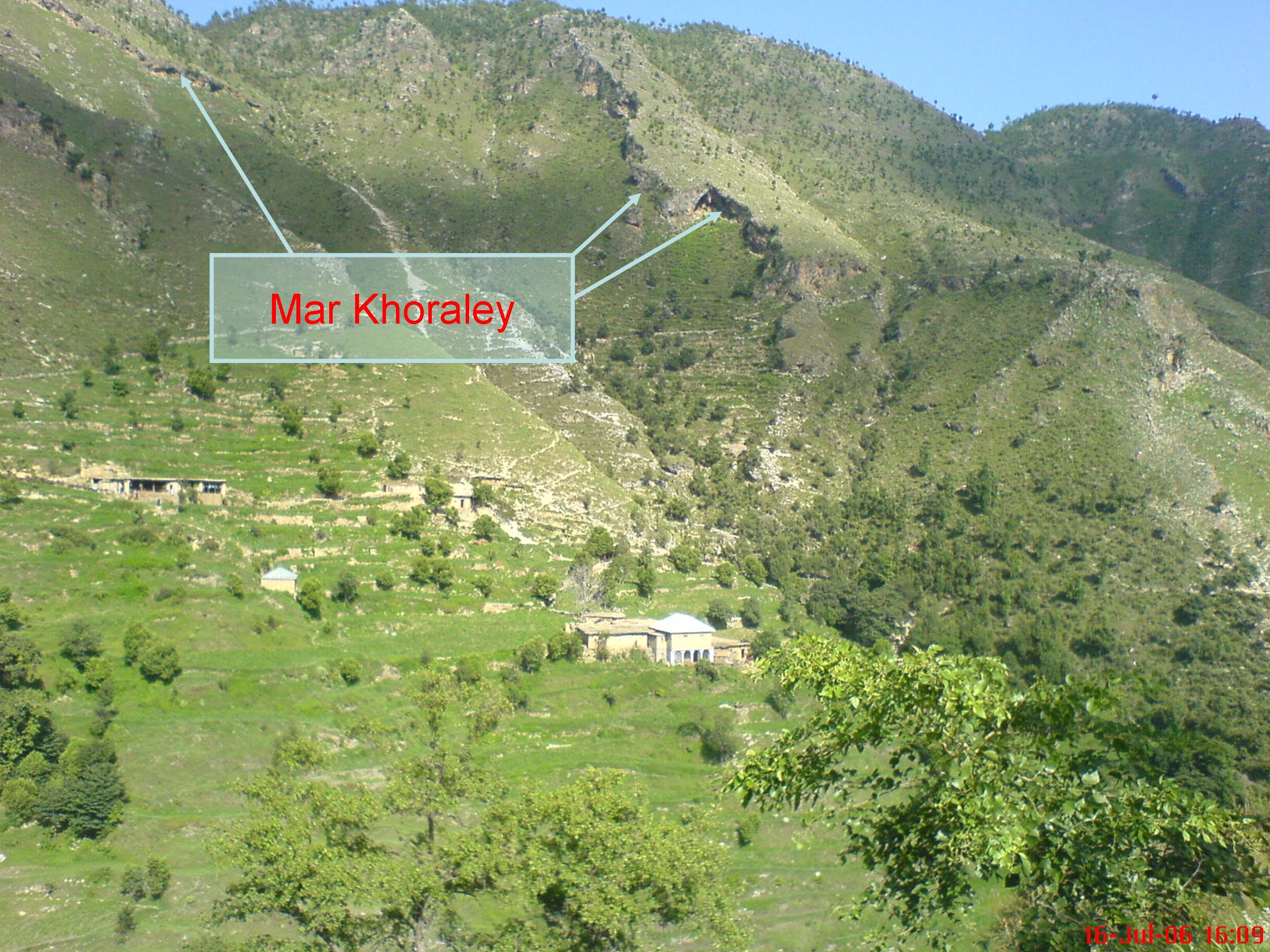
Mar Khoraley in Tangiyal Hill

The name "Martung" is supposed to be derived from the word "Mar Tuang" meaning snake charmer basket. Central Martung is relatively a low altitude valley surrounded by high hills from all around resembling to a snake charmer basket. There also exists a story about presence of a huge monster snake in Martung in the past. According to the story, the monster snake lived in the northern part of Tangiyal hill in Martung and ate rocks and soil from the hill. That portion of the hill looks to have been eaten away by something and is called "Mar Khoraley" that means eaten by snake in Pashtu. Both of these explanations support the idea "Martung" to be evolved from "Mar Tuang", though not confirmed at all.

== Road links with other cities ==
Martung has road links with Mingora and Buner. Both the links are ordinary jeep tracks mostly with no black topping. Mingora is the largest city and trade centre in the region, but due to relatively better condition of the Buner road and less severe aftermaths of terrorist Taliban activities, people of the area prefer Buner as the nearest largest market and way of exit to the rest of the country. Beside these, two other ordinary jeep tracks from Martung to Chakesar and Martung to Kabalgram also provide alternate ways. Chakesar is connected to Gunangar Shamshikhel and Karora to Mingora-Besham road while from Kabalgram one can cross the river Indus to have access to a road leading to Mansehra and other parts of Hazara.

== Weather ==
=== Climate ===
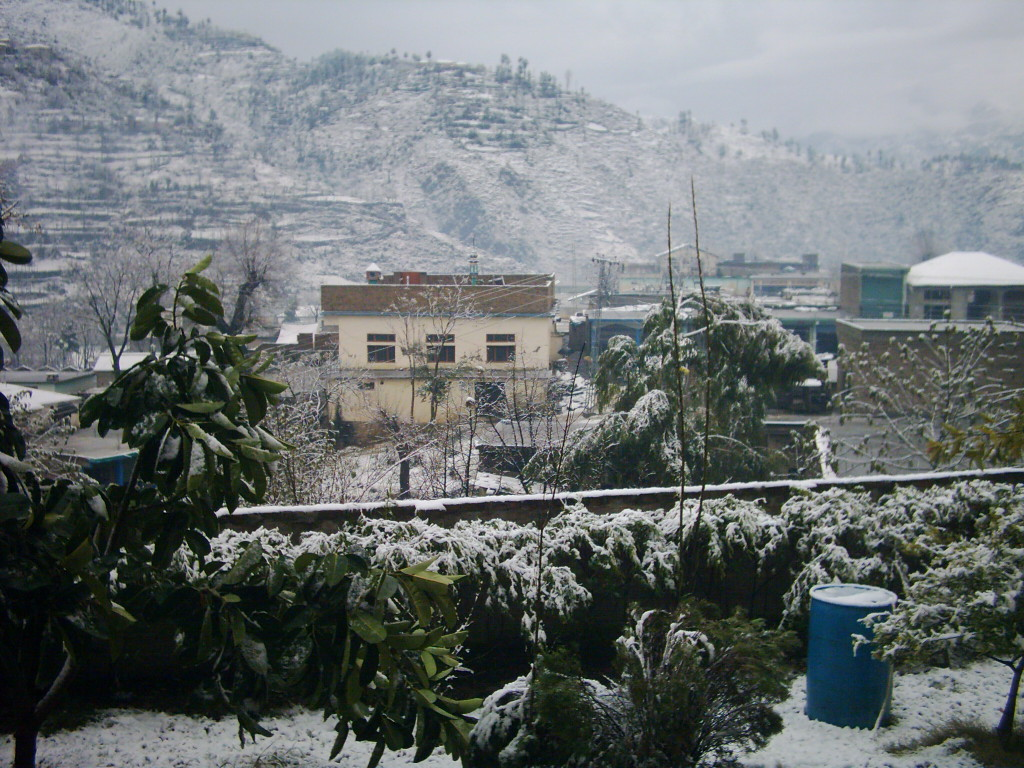
Light snowfall at Martung

Unlike other parts of Shangla, weather in Martung remains moderate in winters and valleys in Martung get little snowfall. Areas very close to river Indus are quite hot in summer. Deforestation has been a great issue especially for Martung since long. People living in this area have no access to coal or gas at all and are facing problems of poor network of electricity, low voltage and load shedding since the area has got connected to the national grid. The people, therefore, have been burning wood for their household cooking and other requirements since the beginning. Although not very cold, even then the temperature goes below freezing point in the winter and people have to keep their houses warm by burning wood. Once there were thick forests of pine and olive trees within the valleys; now forests can only be found in far and high hills.

=== Water situation ===
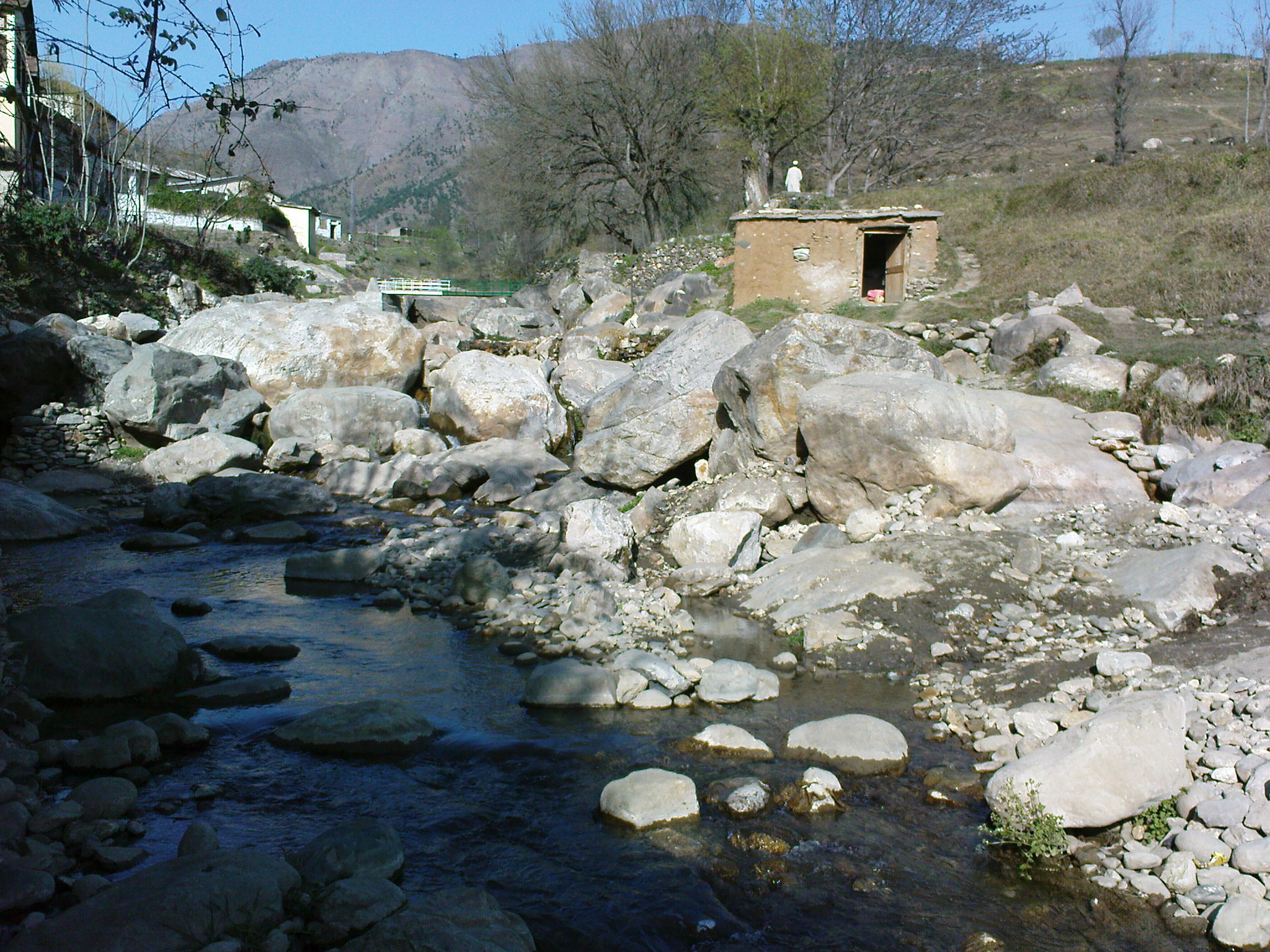
A small river in Martung called Khowar in local language

Martung is not very rich in water in contrast to the rest of District Shangla. Water is not a problem only in Sinkarai viz: the areas very near to the river Indus. Sinkarai includes Kabalgram, Dedal, Kamach, Behar,Gunangar Shamshikhel and many more small villages. The rest of Martung has many springs and small streams but they normally depend on the annual rainfall. Spring water was being used as drinking water since long, which the people carried from nearby springs to their houses. Small pipelines stretched from such springs to one or more houses are also common there, but a proper water supply scheme does not exist. Environmental changes since the early 1990s have affected the area and Martung gets less precipitation than normal since then. Some people living in the valley now dig wells to get water from. The water table is around 50 m below the earth surface in the central village of Martung. This situation has also led to reduced water quantity in the springs and small rivers. For the last 10 to 15 years, there are only two small rivers, namely Eitai and Khowar that flow for the whole year, also with reduced water than usual. This situation has greatly reduced the production of rice in the area, which is one of the major crops being grown there.

== People ==
- Faisal Zeb

=== Professions ===
People of this area mainly live on farming. Soil of Martung is rich and fertile but unfortunately there is no irrigation system and agriculture in the area mainly depends upon rains. People are poor and are not aware of modern agriculture; they use old traditional ways and tools. They mainly grow wheat, maize and rice but not on the commercial scale. These are hardly enough for most of the people to eat. Being physically far from the local market (Mingora), it is not feasible to take their products to the market because of high transportation expenses. People grow vegetables and fruits only on small scale for their own use. A large number of people go to big cities of the country like Lahore and Karachi for seeking low level jobs like watch men, waiters in restaurants and labourers. Some people (very small portion) have small businesses in the local market and a few are government employees.

=== Population and literacy ===
The population of the Tehsil is more than 85,000 persons. It was about 79,000 according to 1998 census. The central town Koozkalai has an approximate population of 6,500+ persons. Literacy rate in Martung is very low; less than 7% for male and less than 1% for female on the average. This figure is a little high for larger villages like Kabalgram, Koozkalai, Shaga, Karindara and Manzkalai. There was only one secondary school for boys in the area till 2006, and a few middle and primary schools for both boys and girls. Number of students and level of education both are very much below standards in all the educational institutes.

=== Culture and religion ===
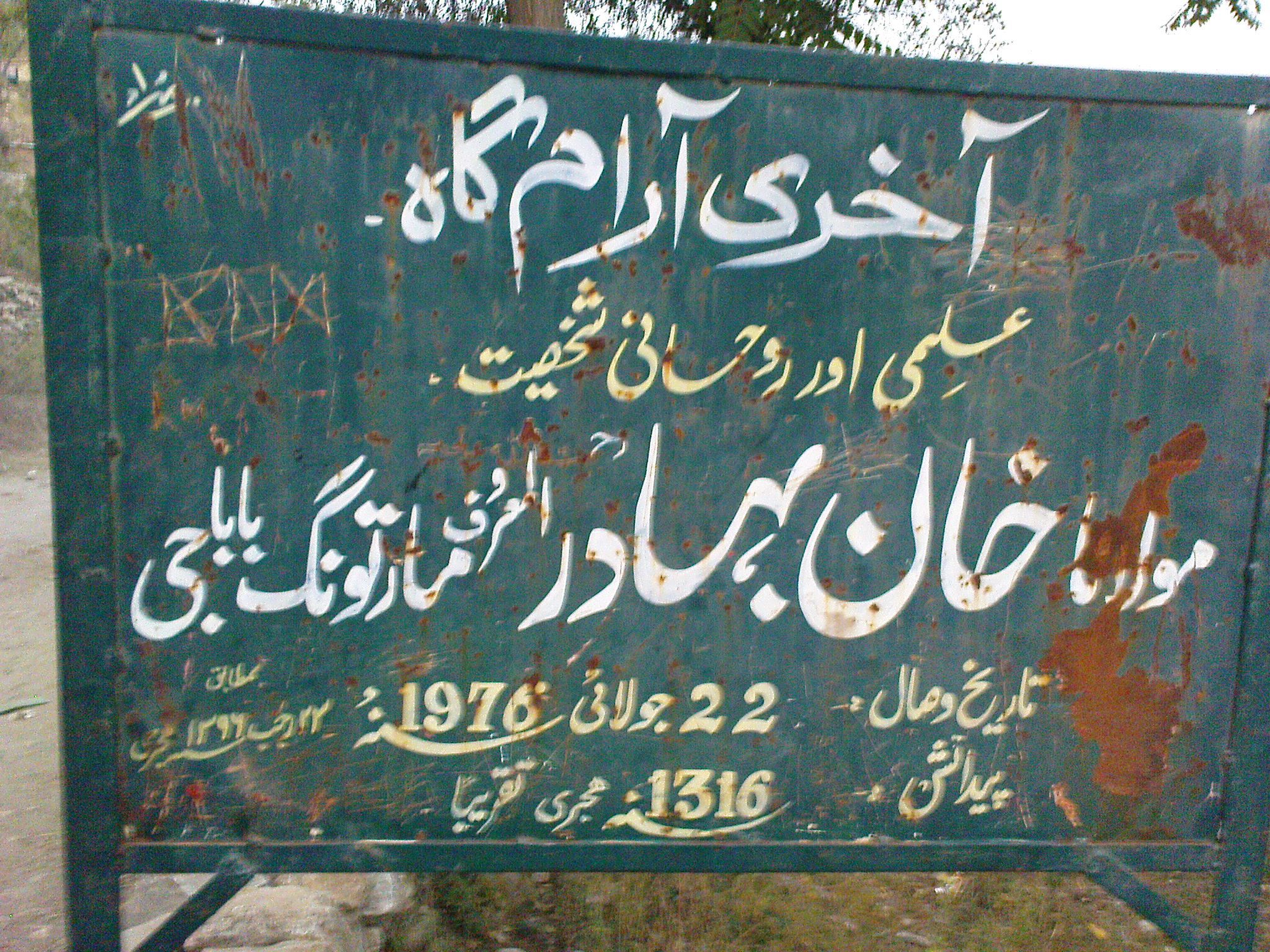
Board near the Shrine of Martung Babajee

The people have rich culture and great moral values. Unlike the general image of Pathans, Martungis are peace loving people. Tribal enmities are very rare. Some of the typical Pathan cultures like Hujra and Jirga are still active in most of the villages. The inhabitants of Martung mainly belong to Aziz Khel or Azikhel and Khan Khel, section of the major Pathan tribe Yousafzai. Pashto is the major local language of all the inhabitants. Very few families in far hilly areas speak Gujri as their mother tongue and Pushto as their second language. Being national language of the country Urdu is understood by most of the people.

All of Martung people are Sunni Muslims by religion. Maulana Khan Bahadur (1898?~1976) known as Martung Babajee has been the well-known religious and spiritual figure in the history of Martung. Religious students from whole of Khyber Pakhtunkhwa and Afghanistan used to come to Martung and seek religious knowledge during his lifetime.

=== Hakeem Sahib of Alamibanda ===
Hakeem Sahib of Alamibanda is one of the notable figures of Martung, renowned for his so-called specialty in old traditional medicines. He is not conventionally educated in medicines and has inherited some remedies and recipes from his forefathers. He has got countrywide fame for one of his recipes that he uses for the treatment of cancer. Being not formally authorized to practice medicine, some people may object the authenticity of his medicines and treatment; disappointed patients of cancer however visit him from all over the country with the hope that they will spend the remaining moments of their lives with less pain after using his medicine.

== Facilities ==
Martung lacks in most of the basic necessities and facilities. The status of health and education facilities is stagnant for about three decades. Roads have had no improvement since 1969 when the former Swat State was taken up by the Government of Pakistan except for some ordinary jeep tracks constructed by the people themselves with either no or very little support from the local government. With increase in overall level of awareness and life style, status of local market has been improved and most items of day to day use are now easily available. Martung was connected to the national grid of electricity and telephone network in 2006–07.

=== Health ===
Martung does have an (RHC) rural health center being active since 2018, upgraded from BHU(basic health care unit), located in central martung koozkalay. Apart from that some private health facilities are also available but no major medical and surgical facilities. The people of martung usually travel to swat, buner or puran in about 20km to seek health care.

=== Education facilities ===
Government High School Martung is the oldest educational institute in the area. Middle School Martung opened by Government of the former Swat State in 1960s was upgraded to secondary level as High School Martung in 1980 and is still at the same position. This was the only secondary school in the Tehsil until 2006 when Middle School Titwalan and Middle School Pishlor were upgraded to secondary level. There are however a few middle and primary schools within the tehsil providing the so-called basic education to the children. Lacking in facilities even like chalk and black board, neither the teachers nor parents of the students take interest in the schools. Many of the primary schools are just Ghost Schools with no students and buildings. The only one middle school for girls in Koozkalai is facing severe shortage of teachers. Few politically appointed female teachers seldom visit the school; most of them have hired less educated poor girls for very small amount compared to their salary to impersonate them. A few private schools, however, have some female students comparatively in better educational environment to the government schools

=== Roads ===
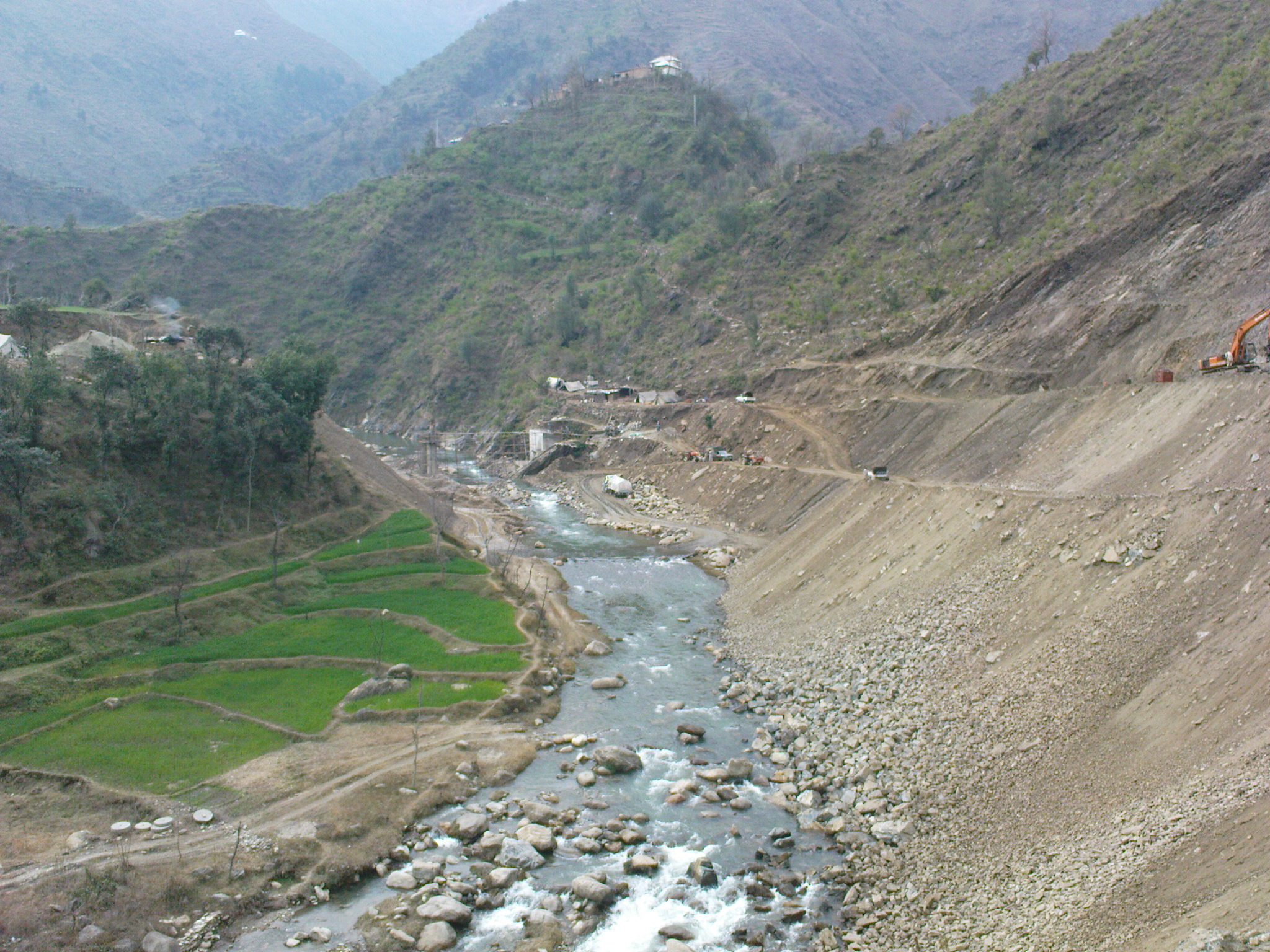
Buner-Martung Link Road Under Construction near River Eitai

Government of the former Swat State had constructed an ordinary road (with no black topping) from Mingora to Martung via Puran. Though not black topped, the road was well maintained in the duration of Swat State until 1969 and was one of the best tracks at that time. After accession of the Swat State by Pakistan Government, the road had been neglected and there was no improvement until early nineteen nineties. In nineteen nineties, when Pir Muhammad Khan of Puran remained Member of Provincial Assembly for five consecutive times, he took interest in the portion of the road from Mingora to Puran and improved it a little bit, but its condition is still not up to the mark.

Another ordinary track road from Buner has also been constructed and joined with the existing road midway between Puran and Martung. This road is likely to be improved. It has provided a second option for the people to have link with the rest of the country especially in severe winter conditions when the other link is either blocked or very difficult to cross due to snowfall.

Martung-Chakesar link road is also being improved and is likely to provide an alternate way soon after its completion. Martung-Kabalgram road is yet another way to have access to Hazara Division from Kabalgram across the river Indus. This track is, however, in very poor condition and not usable except for specially designed jeeps. This was the only way of exit for the people of Puran and Martung when the Buner and Mingora roads were in-accessible because of the Taliban movement and the army operation against it in 2009. People have also constructed link tracks from the main road to many small villages by themselves either with no or very little help from the government.

=== Telephone and electricity ===
Martung remained disconnected from the national grid and telephone network until 2006. In 2006–07, electricity supply was provided to Martung followed by telephone exchange. Mobile network was also made active in 2008. All these connections were badly suffered by the activities of Taliban and the army operation against them. Telephone network in the area has still not been restored.

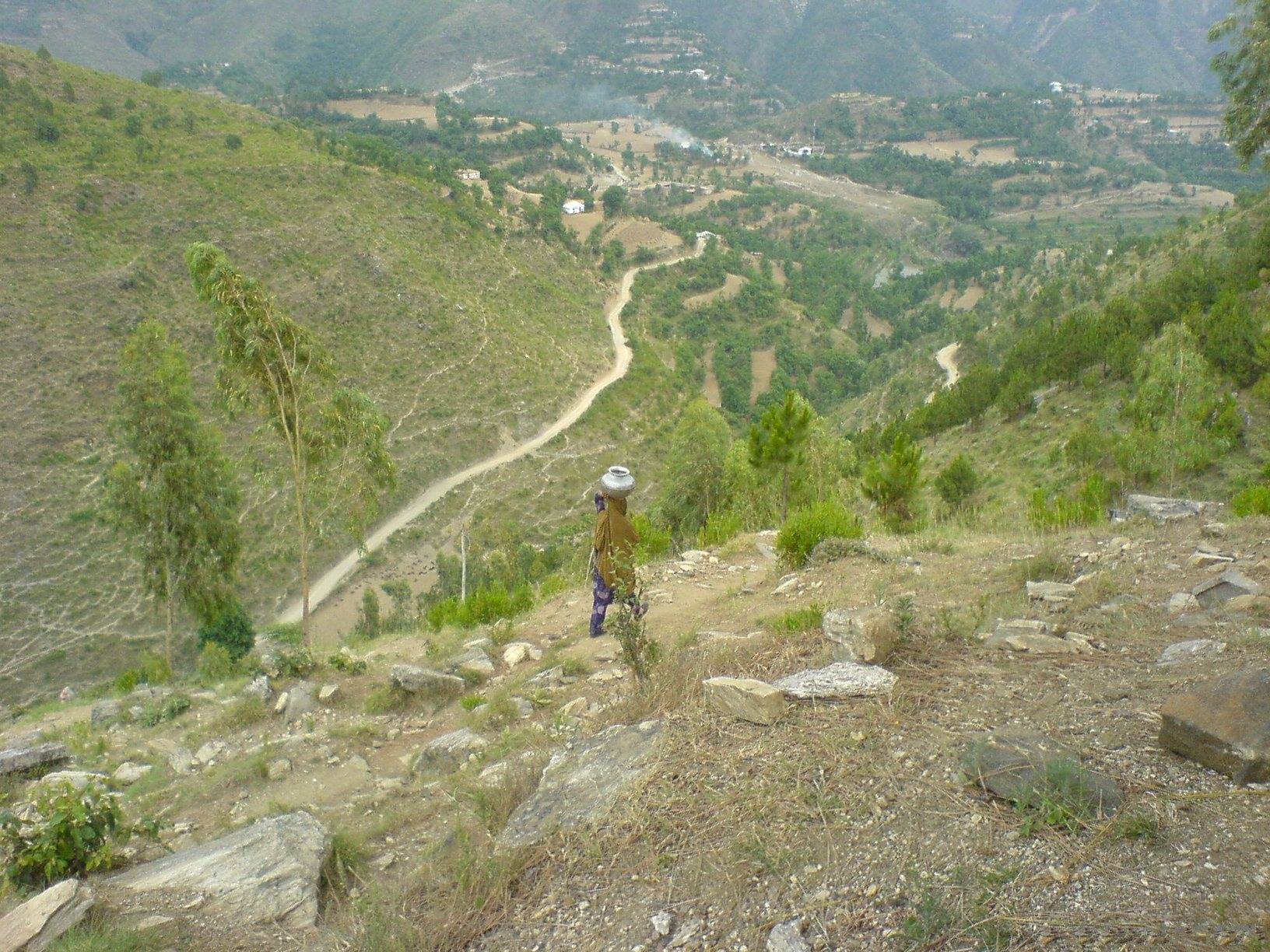
A Martung woman fetching water

=== Water supply and drinking water ===
It is the very basic necessity of life Martung is still lacking in. Drinking and domestic water has been a problem in Martung since long. People used to bring water from the nearby springs for their house hold use until there was enough availability of such water for them. With increase in population, change in life style of the people and worse water conditions, people try to go for alternate options to get water. No proper water supply scheme is available within the area. (See Water Situation within this article for further details)

== Da Shage Jang ==
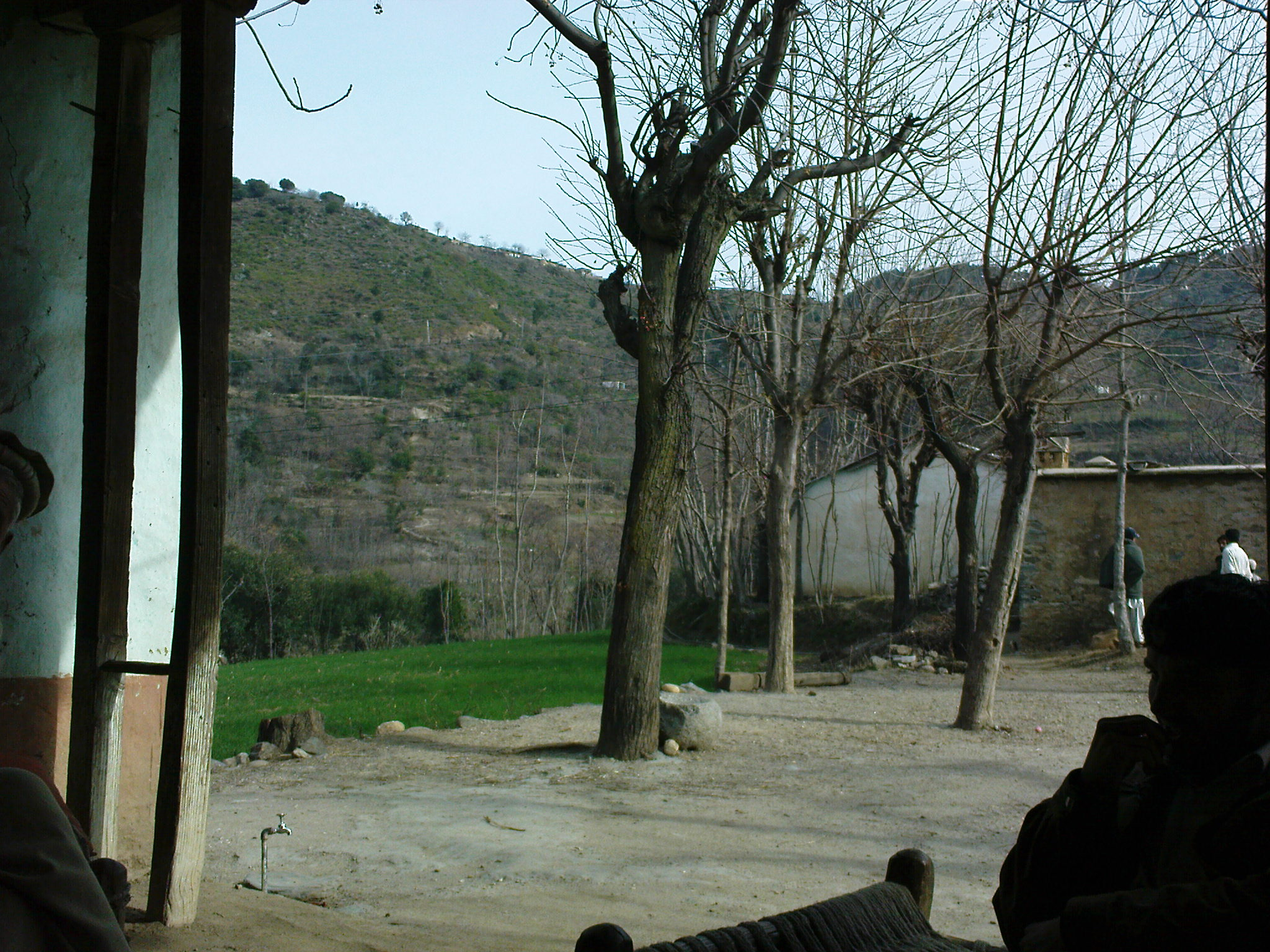
A picture taken inside Shaga village

"Da Shage Jang" (Means Battle of Shaga) is an important event in the history of Martung. Shaga is one of the major villages situated in central Martung at a distance of about two kilometers from both Koozkalai and Manzkalai. The residents of Shaga belong to Chagharzai sub tribe of Yousufzai, and historically are rivals of Azikhel i.e. the residents of Koozkalai and Manzkalai. In the beginning of 20th century, Shaga was very strong and contained a protective wall around the village. Practically there was no government in this area in those days and the people lived tribal life. Chagharzai were aggressive and were a threat for Azikhel. In September(?) 1908 Azikhel decided to fight a decisive war against them. They collected their force from the nearby areas like Chakesar and Shahpur and jointly attacked Shaga. Defense of Shaga was very strong, and at the beginning they shot dead top leaders of their rivals from behind the protective wall. In the evening, Azikhel were able to break the protective wall and entered the village. They burnt the entire village and killed almost all males except young boys and children who were taken away by their mothers. Killing of women and children was against the tribal rules.

For long, people of Martung have been using "Da Shage Jang" as a reference for measuring dates and counting years. The author of this article has met a few people in Martung who remembered the event. As this event is nowhere documented, thus data and some legends attached to the event have not been stated here.

== Earthquake in 2005 ==
Martung was hit by severe earthquake on October 8, 2005 resulting in scores of casualties and leaving hundreds of people homeless.

== Martung and Taliban ==
The terrorist Taliban movement in 2007-09 affected Martung like all other surrounding areas. People of Martung were not displaced and they did not face shelling from the security forces, but they spent their lives for months in intense fear and feeling of insecurity as the war was expected to reach the area. They also faced shortage of food and other necessary items of daily life, lack of medicine, unavailability of communication means etc. due to blockage of roads and operation in Mingora and Buner. Taliban have no support from the local people of Martung and that's why they could not succeed to carry out their activities here.

A hardliner Islamic cleric and former politico-religious personality of Kabalgram Maulana Waliullah had ties with the Taliban and thus they had a few supporters in Kabalgram and Behar villages. Being local and belonging to a notable clan in the area, Waliullah could not support Taliban openly in the duration they were fighting against Pakistan army in Swat and Buner. He played a dual role and tried to mediate between Taliban and the people of Martung, Puran and Chakesar. He had, however, been providing shelter and way of exit to those Taliban who succeeded to reach Kabalgram from Buner via Martung. Waliullah was respected by all the leaders of Taliban including Maulana Fazlullah as a teacher and powerful supporter of their movement. He thus managed to keep Taliban away from Martung until start of June 2009. In early June 2009 when weakened in Swat and Buner, some Taliban moved to Yakhtangay in Puran tehsil and some areas of Martung adjuscent to Buner. Sensing threat to his life from both the local anti Taliban people and the army, Waliullah surrendered himself to security forces just after they entered Martung. He was released by Pakistan Army for a few days in July, 2010 and re-arrested shortly afterwards. He died on 7 December 2010 in the custody of the security forces. During his captivity, the army presented him a few times before media. Every time he spoke in favour of the army and their operation against the terrorists.

Taliban have apparently no roots in Martung. No one can openly support Taliban or even talk in their favour. Some events, however, prove their hidden existence in the region. In November 2012, a bomb attack on police van killed a cop and injured four more at Martung. On 12 January 2014, convoy of Amir Muqam, Senior Vice President PML-N and Adviser to Prime Minister Nawaz Sharif was targeted by a bomb blast at Martung killing six people including five policemen; luckily Amir Muqam had a narrow escape.. Two brothers were arrested from Martung in November 2011 for having an apparent link with Osama bin Laden and his stay at Abbottabad. Similarly, the suicide bomber who attacked Superintendent of Police (SP) Crime Investigation Department (CID) Chaudhry Aslam in Karachi on 9 January 2014 is said to be from Kabalgram, Martung.

== Notable people ==
- Maulana Safiullah Dadaji (1870-1948) - spiritual scholar and Islamic philosopher

== Gallery ==
Martung

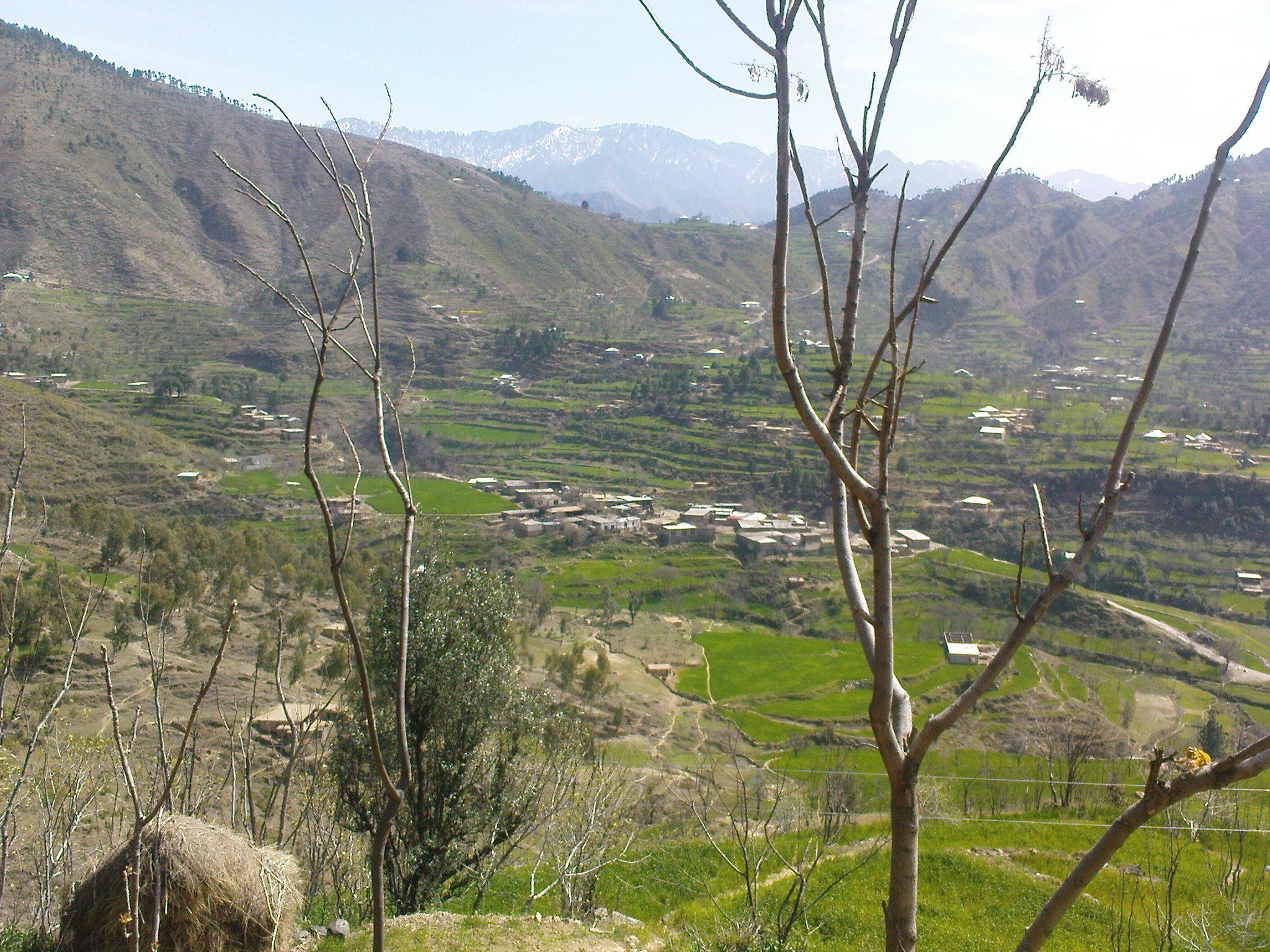
A nice scenery of Martung, with Manzkalai prominently visible

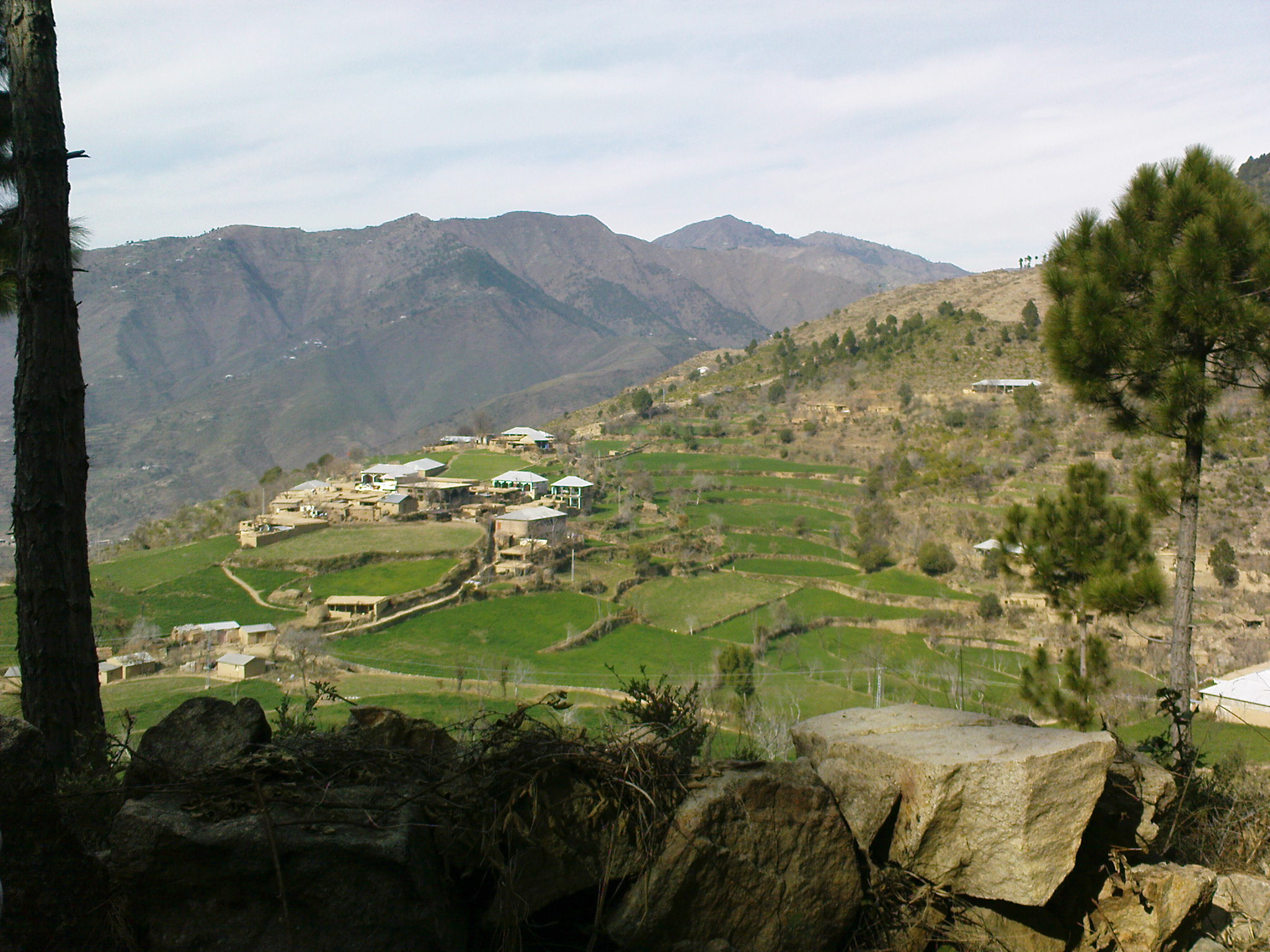
A view of Asharo Sar village in Martung Tehsil

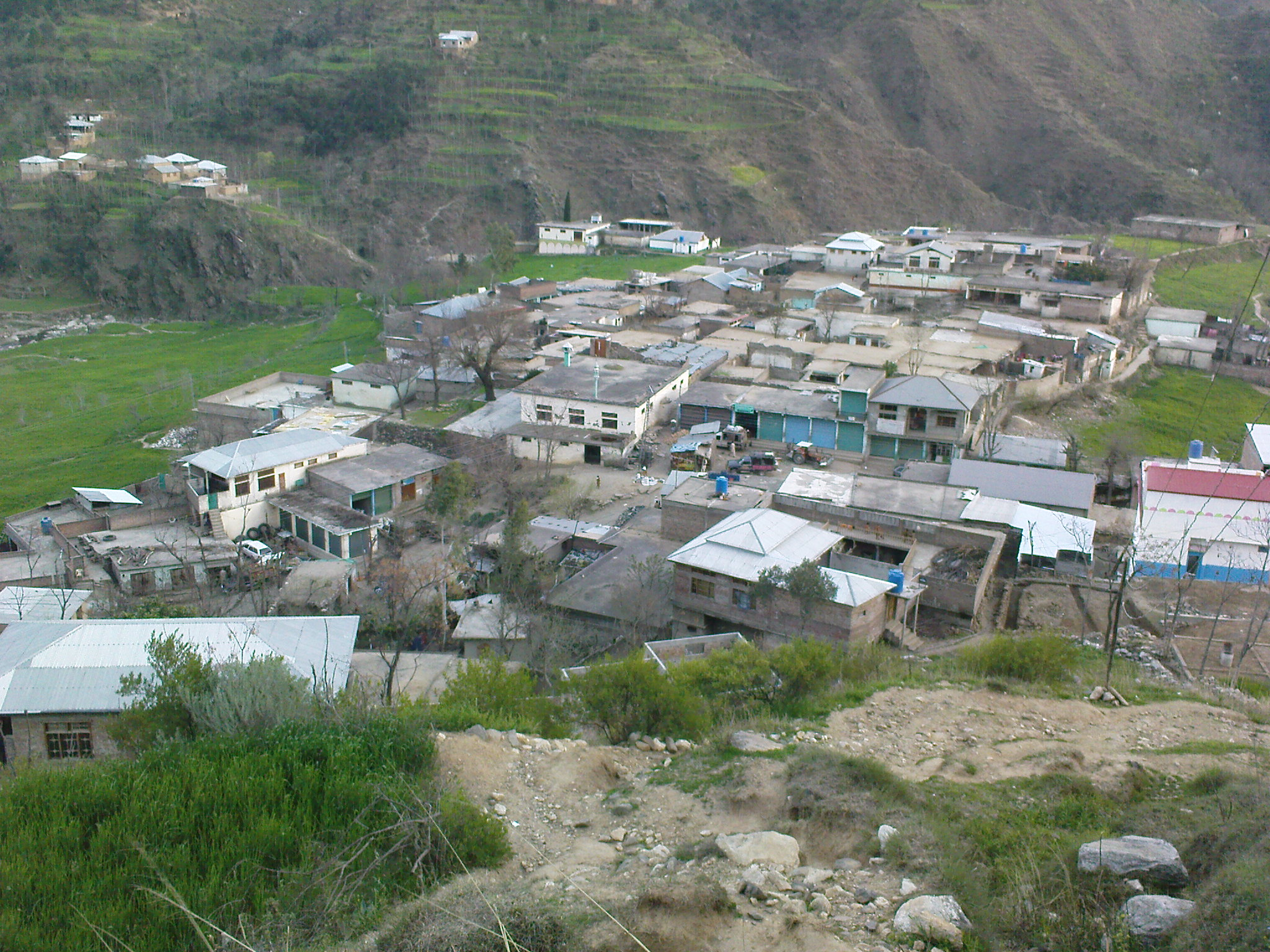
A close up view of Koozkalai, Martung

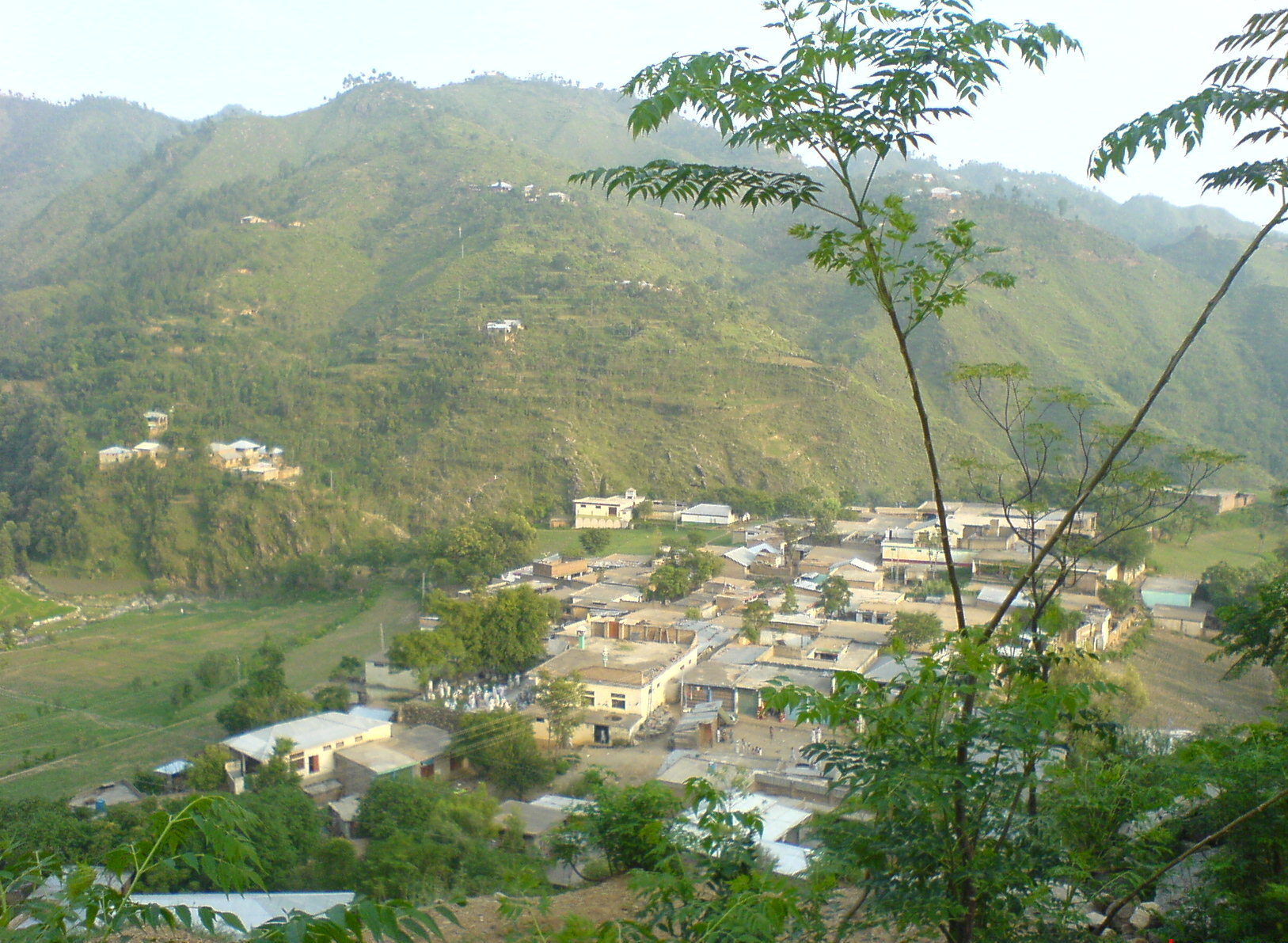
A view of Koozkalai, Martung

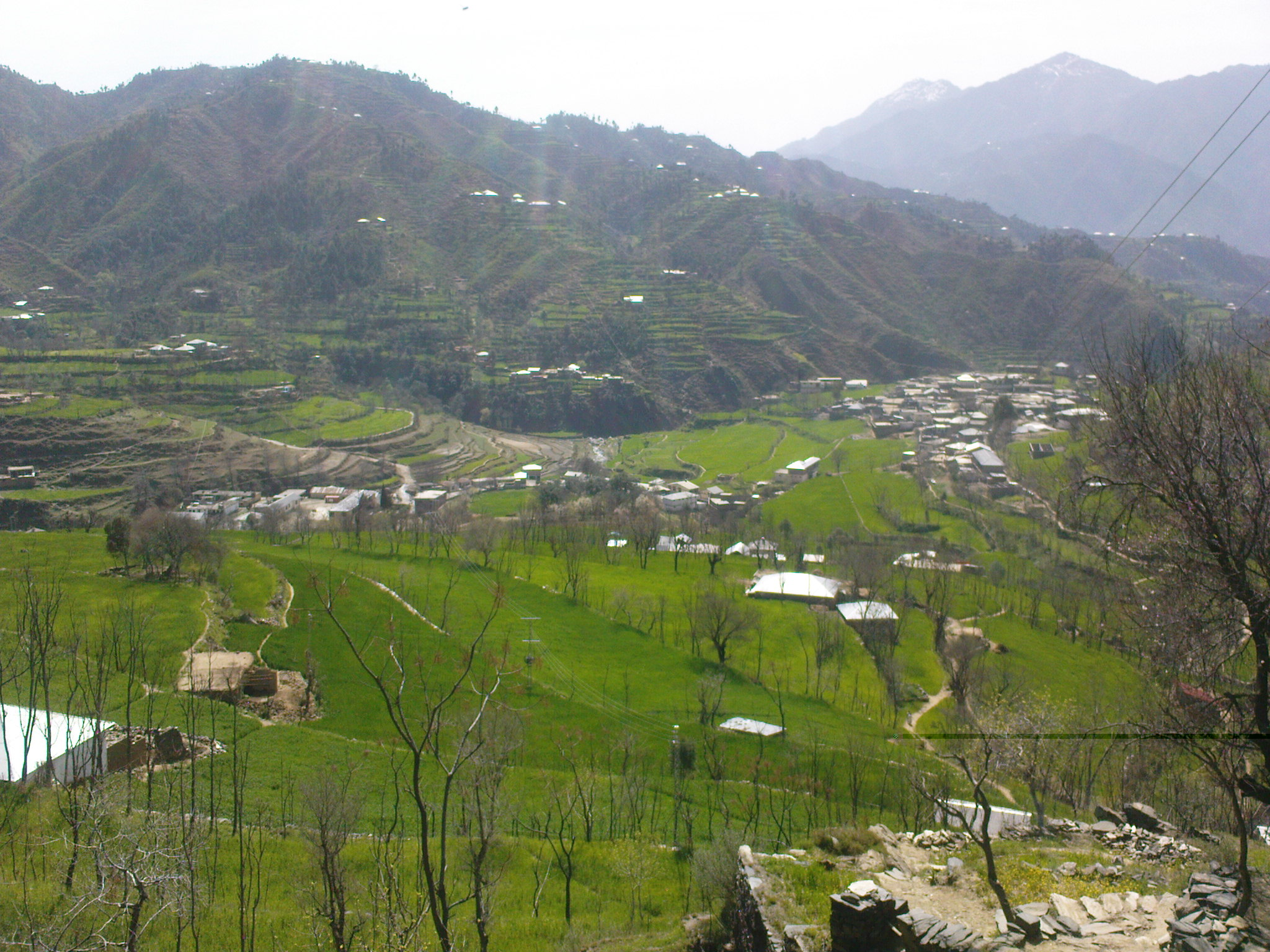
Martung Valley, Green with Wheat Crop

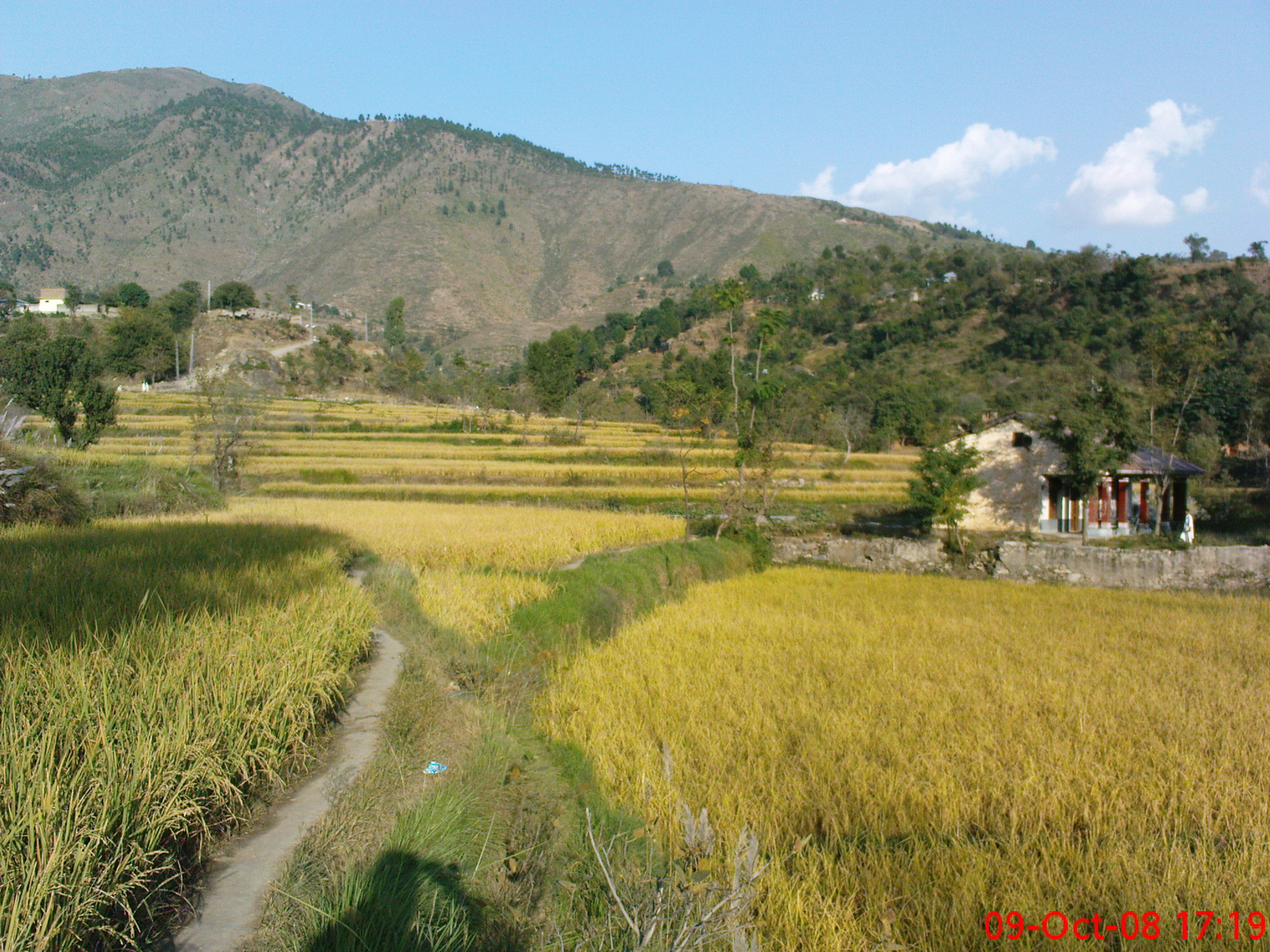
Rice Fields at Martung

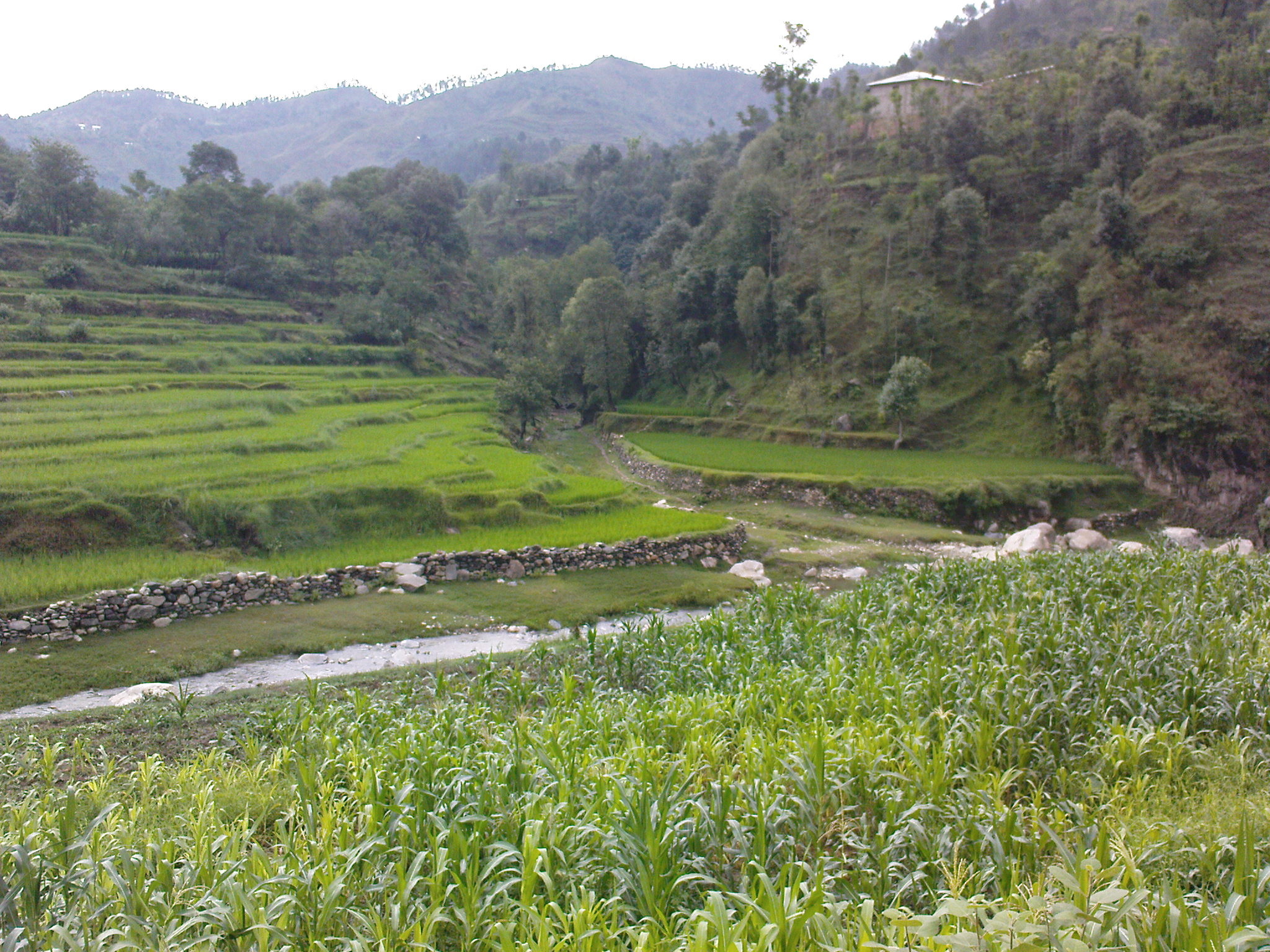
A scenery of Small River in Martung, called Khoward

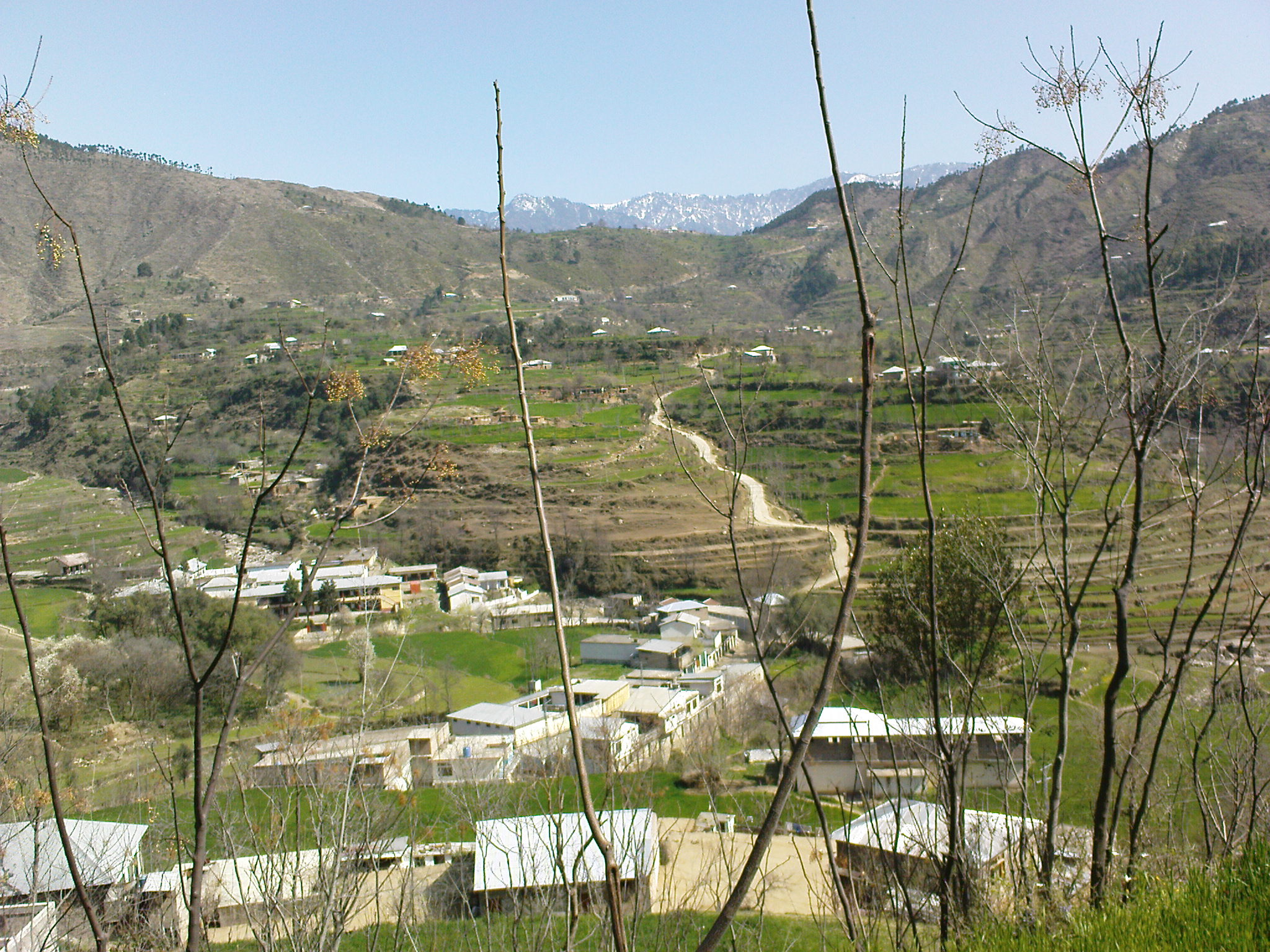
A scene of Martung, High School Martung being visible

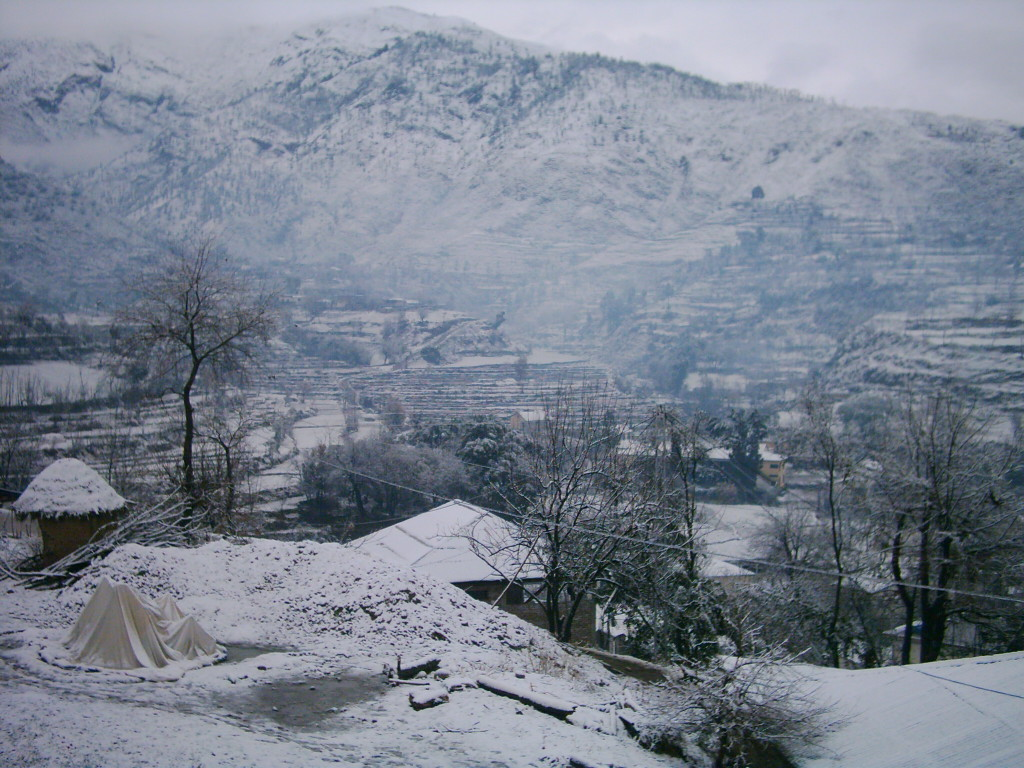
Light snow fall at Martung

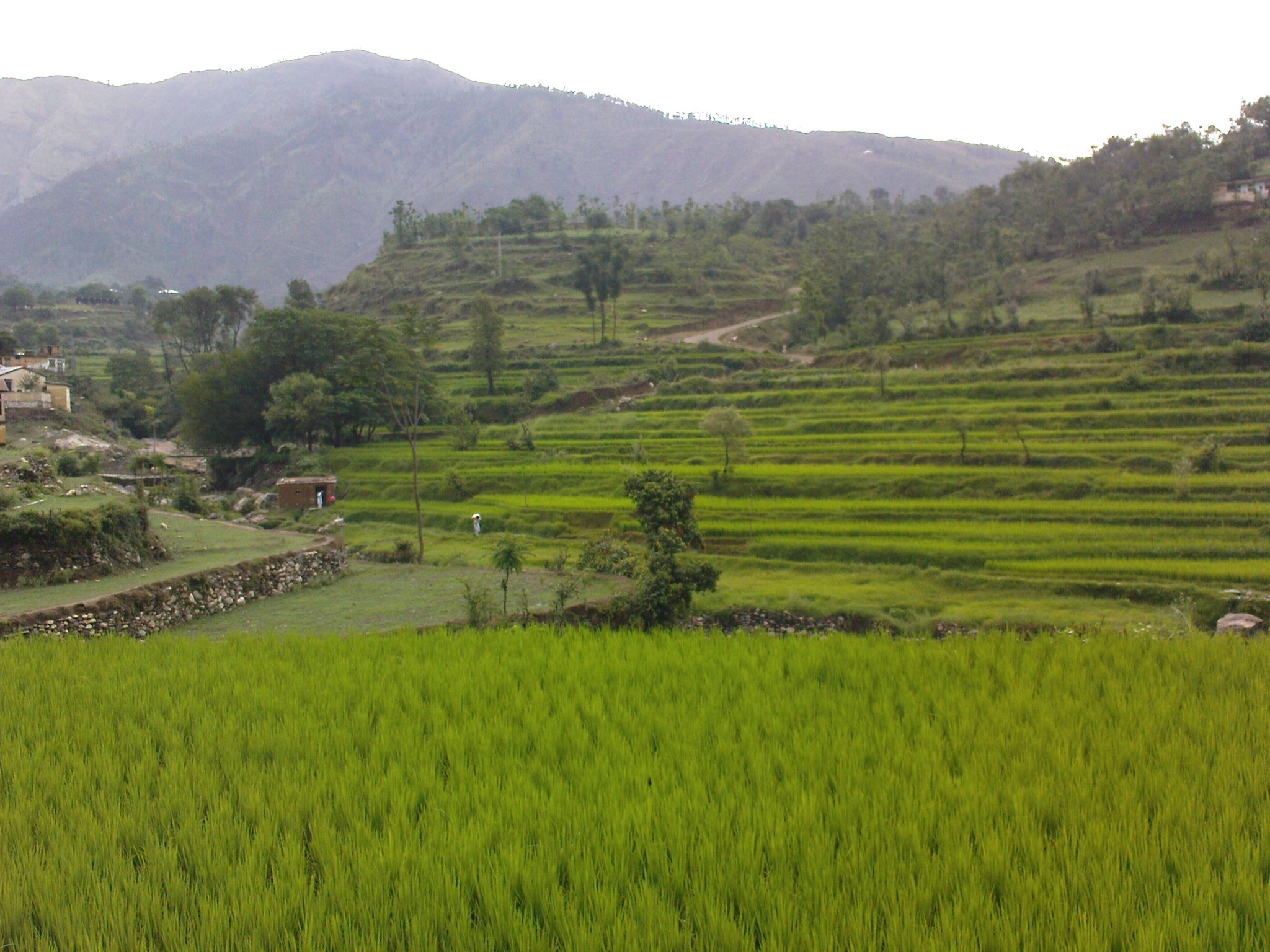
Rice fields at Martung in August

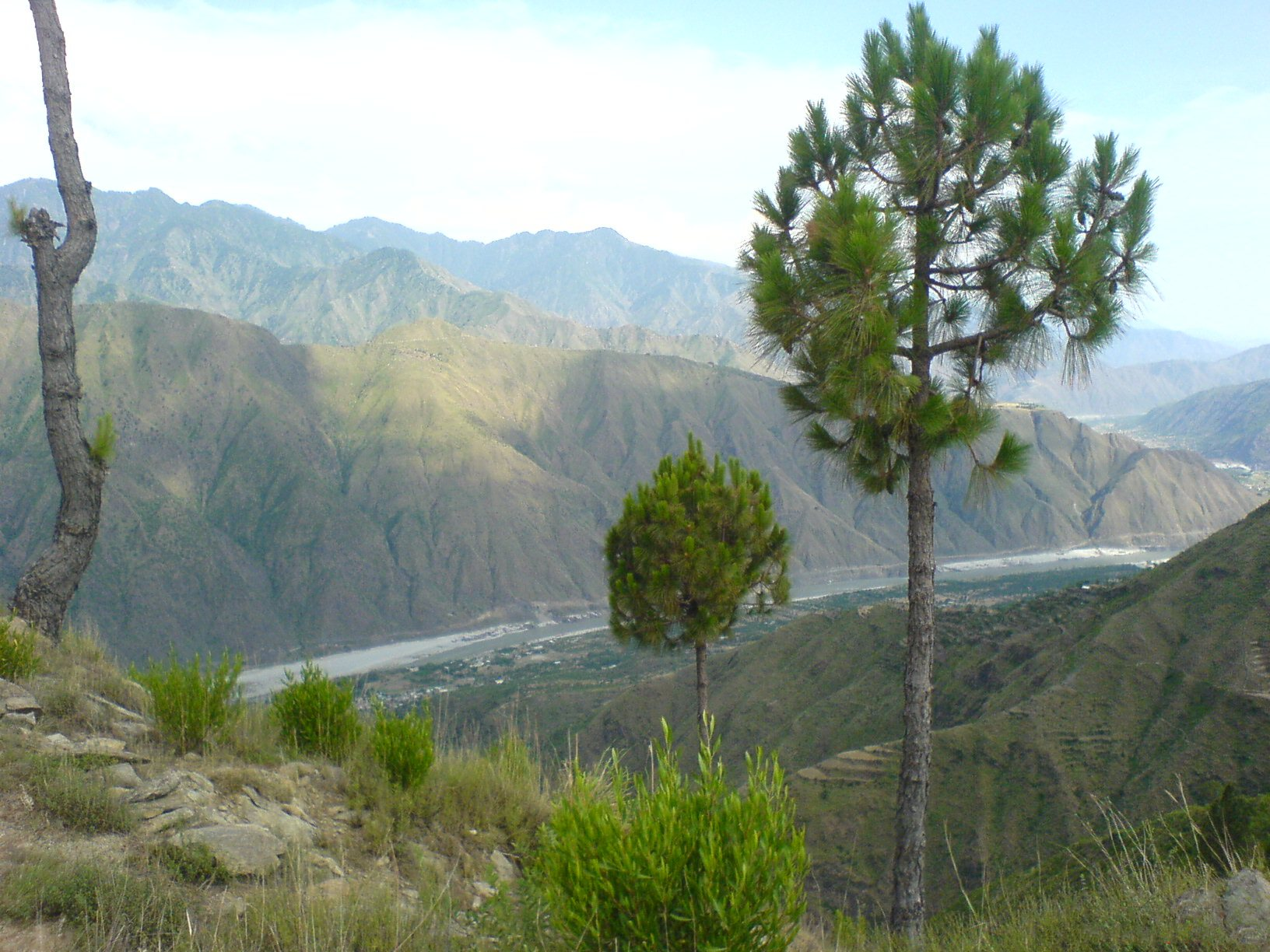
Sight of River Indus from Dherako Martung

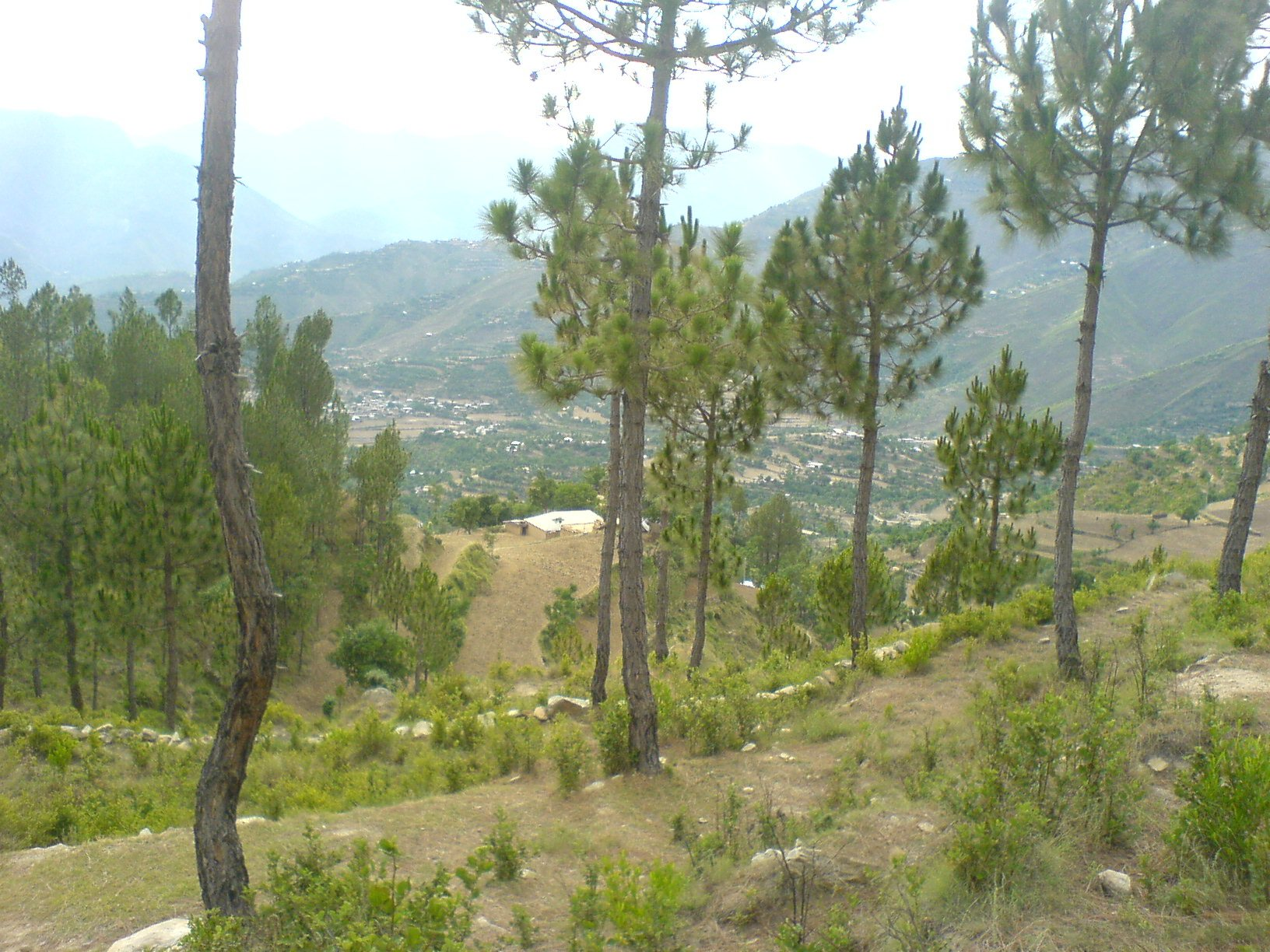
A scenery from Asharo Sar

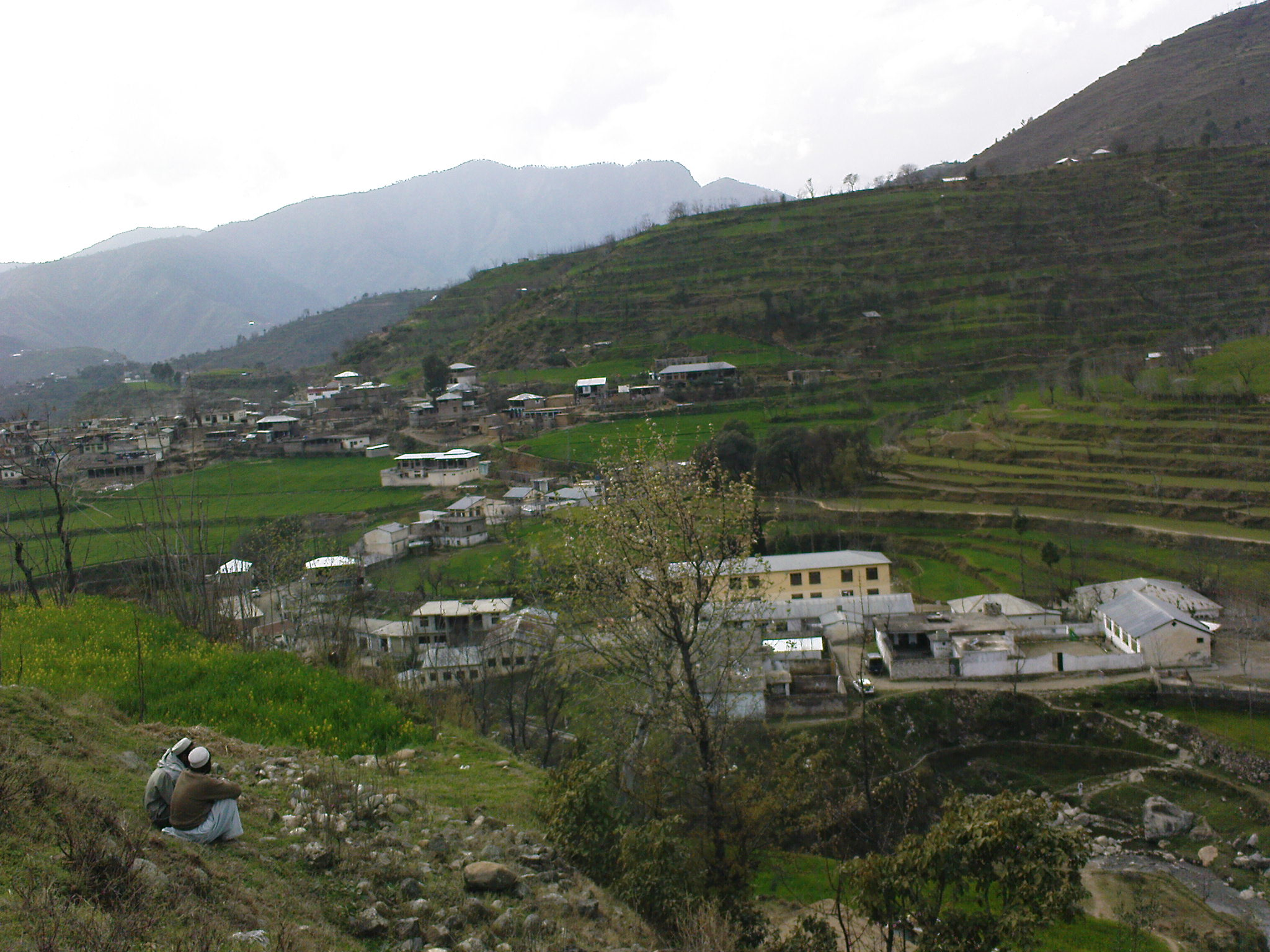
Martung in early Spring 2009

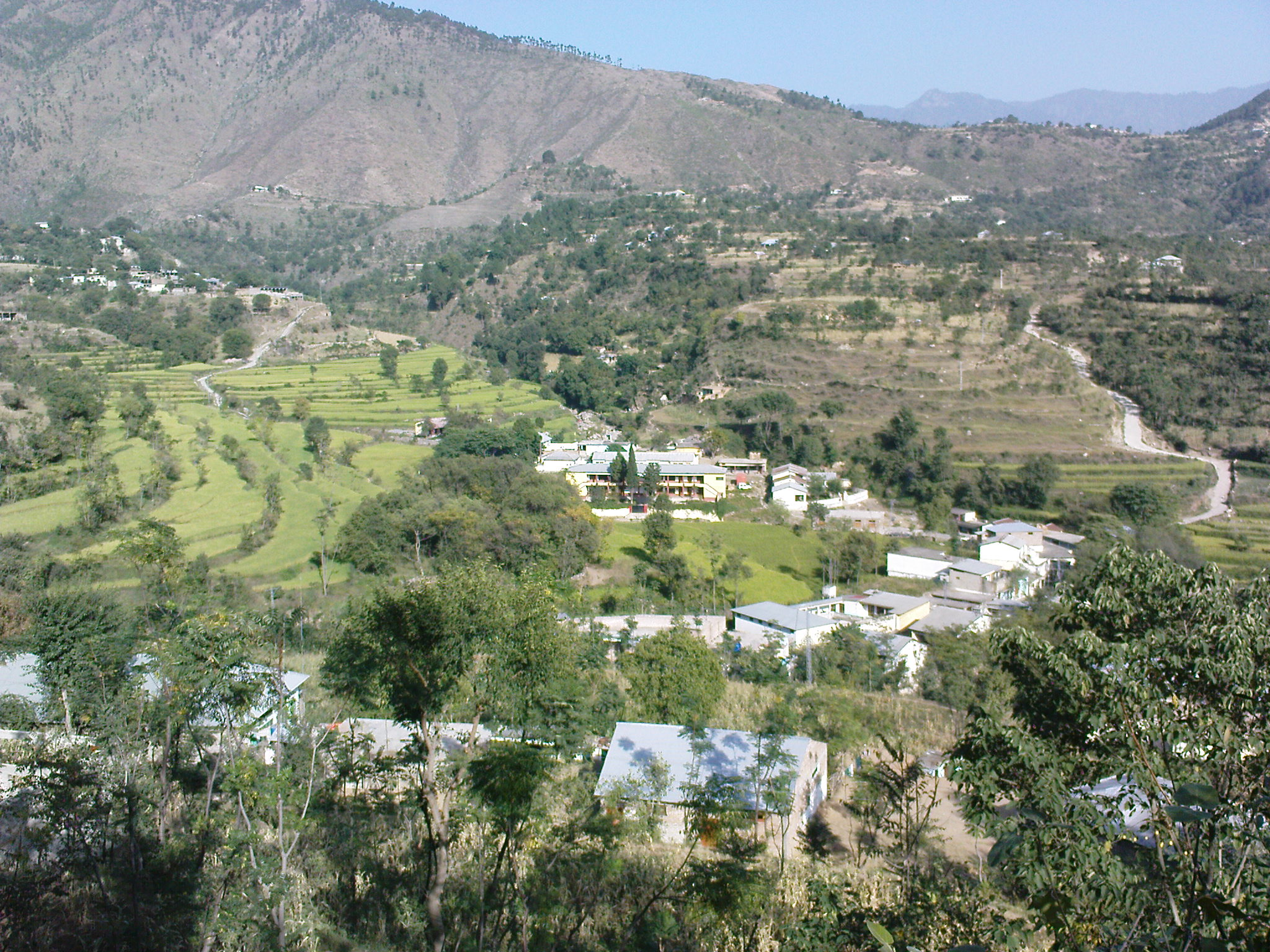
Martung in early Autumn 2009
