= Titwalan =

Titwalan is a town included in Martung Tehsil of Shangla District, North-West Frontier Province, Pakistan. It is situated in the south-east of central Martung at the border of Shangla and Buner districts. The town lacks in almost all the basic facilities of life.

Titwalan was hit by severe earthquake on October 8, 2005 resulting scores of casualties and house damage. Being remote and having no road link with any other part of the tehsil, no relief or aid for the effectees was provided by any agency.
