= Karindara =

Coordinates: 34°42′20″N 72°45′29″E

Karindara is a village located in Tehsil Martung of Shangla District, Khyber Pakhtunkhwa, Pakistan.

== History ==
The recorded history of Karindara dates back to the late 19th century. According to local historical and oral traditions, Hazrat Shah great Grand father of Advocate Saifullah along with his relatives, migrated to the area around 1895 from Jower (Jawar), District Buner. These early settlers belonged to the Salarzai sub-tribe of the Yousafzai Pashtuns and established permanent residence by cultivating land and forming small settlements. Around 1905, additional families from the Salarzai tribe migrated from Buner and joined the earlier settlers, contributing to the expansion of the village. Over time, Karindara developed into a recognized settlement within Martung Tehsil, retaining its tribal structure, customs, and cultural identity. During the twentieth century, Karindara experienced gradual social and educational development. The village produced professionals in various fields, including engineers, doctors, lawyers, and educators, many of whom have served in government institutions, private sectors, and overseas. Employment-related migration, particularly to Gulf countries and Europe, also played a role in improving the socio-economic conditions of local households. Karindara has traditionally been influenced by its natural surroundings. The area experiences moderate summers, with temperatures generally ranging between 20°C and 36°C, while winters are cold, with temperatures occasionally falling to 0°C or below, and snowfall occurring in surrounding areas. Natural features such as Ghata Cheena, a well-known local spring, have historically served as important sources of water and remain notable landmarks. Elevated areas such as Ghary Sar are also recognized locally for their geographical significance. Sports and recreational activities have been part of village life, with Karindara Cricket Ground (KCG) serving as a central venue for cricket matches and community gatherings. Such spaces have contributed to social interaction among residents, particularly youth. Culturally, Karindara follows traditional Swat and Shangla Pashtun customs. Hospitality has long been a defining social value, with guests being treated with respect and care in accordance with Pashtunwali traditions. Celebratory practices include communal gatherings at the birth of a male child, during which relatives and friends visit the household and participate in customary feasts. Religious and social life is closely connected to local mosques; during the month of Ramadan, residents commonly gather at the Jamia Mosque for communal iftar, often bringing food from their homes to share with others. Despite social and economic changes over time, Karindara has maintained its historical character, shaped by tribal heritage, communal traditions, and a strong sense of social cohesion.
