= Ziarat Talash =

Ziarat Talash زیارت تالاش
- City
- Country: Pakistan
- Province: Khyber Pakhtunkhwa
- District: Lower Dir

Government
  - Body: Union council
- Elevation: 898 m (2,946 ft)

Population (2017)
  - Total: 6,000
- Time zone: UTC+5 (PST)
- Postal code: 18700
- Website: https://www.facebook.com/tallashvalley/

Ziarat Talash (Urdu: زیارت تالاش) is a city in the Lower Dir District of Khyber Pakhtunkhwa, Pakistan. It is located at 34.86° 71.79° at an elevation of 3042 ft 20 km from Chakdara and 21 km away from the district headquarters, Timergara.
