= Operation Sarbakaf =

Military operation in Bajaur, Pakistan

- Part of the Insurgency in Khyber Pakhtunkhwa and the much larger Operation Azm-e-Istehkam
Date	29 July 2025 – present
Location	Mamund Tehsil, Bajaur District, Khyber Pakhtunkhwa
Status	Ongoing operation

Belligerents
Pakistan	Pakistani Taliban Islamic State–Khorasan Province

Commanders and leaders
President Asif Ali Zardari; Prime Minister Shebaz Sharif; Field Marshal Syed Asim Munir	Noor Wali Mehsud Shahab al-Muhajir

Units involved
Pakistan Armed Forces; Pakistan Army; XI Corps; SSG; Army Aviation Corps; Artillery Regiment Corps; Pakistan Air Force; Civil Armed Forces; Frontier Corps; Frontier Corps North KPK; Bajaur Scouts; Federal Constabulary; (on border) Pakistan Police Service; KPK Police; Elite force; Special Combat Unit; Pro-Pakistani Pashtun Tribesmen	Unknown

Strength
Unknown	Unknown

Casualties and losses
~28 soldiers and policemen	+75 militants
- Civilians: 2 killed, 8 injured (local claim); 100,000 displaced Three-day curfew in 16 villages

Operation Sarbakaf is an ongoing Pakistan Army-led counterterrorism offensive launched on 29 July 2025 in Bajaur District of Khyber Pakhtunkhwa, Pakistan. Security forces began the operation in Loi (Lowi), Mamund Tehsil around 9:00 AM, supported by gunship helicopters and artillery, and simultaneously imposed a three-day curfew in 16 villages. Federal authorities and provincial authorities described the aim as eliminating militant hideouts and restoring security in the troubled border region, where a resurgence of Tehrik-i-Taliban Pakistan (TTP) activity had been reported.

Authorities imposed an extended curfew from 11 to 14 August in 27 areas of Mamund Tehsil. In anticipation of large-scale displacement, tents and mattresses were deployed at the Bajaur Sports Complex to accommodate internally displaced persons.

== Background ==
In the first week of July, a bomb blast in Bajaur killed Assistant Commissioner Faisal Ismail, a Tehsildar and two policemen. Later on 10 July 2025 a local Awami National Party leader Maulana Khan Zeb was killed in the same area while he was preparing for a peace march to restore peace in the area.

Bajaur district is located along the border with Afghanistan and the Mamond tehsil shares a direct border with the Kunar province of Afghanistan. Mamond is the largest tehsil of Bajaur district and covers an area of approximately 250 square kilometers. It also shares borders with Salarzai, Khar Bajaur and Navagai tehsils and with two Afghan districts, Shagai and Marwana.

== Operation ==
On 29 July 2025, the local administration, on recommendation of the district intelligence coordination committee, imposed a three‑day curfew in 16 areas of Lowi Mamund tehsil including Badi Siah, Tarkho, Irab, Gat, Agra, Khurchai, and others—from early morning to late afternoon daily—under Section 144 of the Code of Criminal Procedure.

On 30 July 2025, in the early hours, security forces backed by helicopter gunships and artillery launched Operation Sarbakaf.

Initially, the operation was temporarily suspended in response to widespread protests, allowing peace talks between tribal jirgas and militants to proceed. However, after the negotiations collapsed, security forces resumed the offensive, leading to renewed displacement.

Security sources stated that militants must leave Bajaur or face a full-scale operation; alternatively, tribes were asked to vacate the area temporarily to allow military action. The government rejected negotiations unless the militants submitted to the state.

Between September 10 and 13, security operations against militants occurred in multiple areas, including an operation in Bajaur that left 22 militants dead.

On December 29th, a Pakistan Army officer, Major Adeel Zaman, and 5 TTP-affiliates were killed in an intelligence based operation in Khar area of Bajaur, as per ISPR.

On 16 February 2026, a suicide car bombing targeted a joint Frontier Corps (FC) and police check post in Malangi, Mamund Tehsil, Bajaur District.

On 25 February 2026, unidentified armed men attacked the Ababeel Police Squad in the Nawi Kali area of Tehsil Khar in Bajaur District. 4 police officers were killed and two were injured.

== Civilian casualties ==
On 13 August 2025, a mortar strike in Mamund killed two children and their mother, with two more injured. Hundreds of residents protested by refusing to bury the dead until an investigation was initiated.

== Human rights violations ==
In June 2025, Amnesty International expressed concern over the rising number of drone strikes in Khyber Pakhtunkhwa, stating that the Pakistani authorities had failed to protect civilians amid escalating attacks. Isabelle Lassee, Deputy Regional Director for South Asia, noted that the strikes—intensifying since March—demonstrated a disregard for civilian life, citing an incident in which a child was killed.

== Reactions ==
=== Government and military ===
The Khyber Pakhtunkhwa government publicly opposed the operation’s initiation without its consent. The then-Chief Minister Ali Amin Gandapur stated that no military action should proceed without “taking the provincial government into confidence”. Gandapur emphasized unity among state institutions and the people, warning that militants try to sow distrust by hiding among civilians. He announced a series of tribal council (jirga) meetings, starting 2 August, to discuss local grievances.

Additionally, the KP government prevented unilateral curfews by transferring powers of Section 144 from district commissioners to the Home Department, and ordered that no future curfew be imposed in the province without provincial approval. The CM also met with party and security leadership and announced financial relief: Rs10 million compensation for each family of those (civilian or security) killed, and Rs2.5 million for each wounded person.

Gandapur's successor, CM Sohail Afridi blamed the federal government's "flawed policies" for resurgence of violence and accused the central government of withholding war-on-terror funds. He has also opposed military operations in the region.

At the federal level, like other operations, the military’s public communications were minimal. The Pakistani Army's Inter-Services Public Relations (ISPR) did not issue detailed statements on Sarbakaf’s progress; one report noted “Pakistan’s military did not respond to a request for comment” on the events.

=== Local and political ===
The operation sparked immediate local protests. On 30–31 July, hundreds of Bajaur residents (youth, tribal elders and political activists) gathered at Umary Chowk and other points, often displaying black armbands or copies of the Holy Quran, to demand an end to the offensive. They criticized the operation as “unannounced” and complained that the curfew caused severe hardship by cutting off markets and supply routes.

Regional politicians voiced outrage. Several Bajaur lawmakers and tribal leaders – including PTI MPA Dr. Hamid Ur Rehman, former PTI MNA Gul Zafar Khan, MNA Anwar Zeb Khan, ANP’s Aimal Wali Khan, and JI’s Mushtaq Ahmed Khan – publicly condemned the raid and the curfew. They argued that under Pakistan’s Constitution (Article 245), the provincial government’s approval is required for such operations. Some threatened large-scale protests: as Dr. Rehman put it, if the offensive were not halted, he would “take the whole people of Mamund to roads” to demonstrate.

Jamiat Ulema-e-Islam (F) (JUI‑F) also criticized the operation as a “misguided force” response, warning that such measures historically failed to resolve insurgencies.

These leaders also amplified reports of civilian harm. The Bajaur Peace Action Committee, a coalition of local parties and activists, held an emergency meeting on 30 July and demanded an immediate end to Sarbakaf. Their participants reiterated that authorities had assured villagers that civilians would not be targeted – and alleged those assurances had been broken by the reported civilian casualties.

== Humanitarian impact ==
By 12 August 2025, approximately 100,000 people had been displaced by the operation. The Khyber Pakhtunkhwa government authorized Rs.50,000 in compensation per displaced family, while NGOs such as the Al-Khidmat Foundation distributed food aid to those affected.
