= Maulana Khan Zeb =

Pakistani politician (died 2025)

- مولانا خان زیب

Secretary for Ulema Affairs, ANP
- In office 21 April 2025 – 10 July 2025

Personal details
- Born: Nawagai Tehsil, Bajaur district, Khyber Pakhtunkhwa, Pakistan
- Died: 10 July 2025 Khar, Bajaur Bajaur District, Khyber Pakhtunkhwa, Pakistan
- Cause of death: Assassination by unidentified gunmen
- Party: ANP (2024–2025)
- Education: Dars-i-Nizami (1999)
- Occupation: Islamic scholar, historian, peace activist, politician, writer, reformist, environmental activist

Maulana Khanzeb Shaheed (1980 – 10 July 2025) was a Pakistani Islamic scholar, political leader, author, and peace activist from Bajaur. A member of the Awami National Party (ANP), he was known for his religious and social services and his efforts toward peace in the region.

He gained widespread recognition for his campaigns promoting non-violence and preservation of Pashtun culture. He was assassinated on 10 July 2025, in Bajaur, Khyber Pakhtunkhwa, while campaigning for a peace march.

== Early life and education ==
Mulana Khanzeb was born in 1980 in the Nawagai area of Bajaur District, modern-day Khyber Pakhtunkhwa, to Sheikh Khanagul, belonging to a family from the Salarzai‑Shaykhan subtribe of the Tarkalani clan. He was the youngest of six brothers. Maulana Khan Zeb traced his origins to multiple Pashtun tribes, including the Tarkhani, Salarzai, Shuma Khel, and Sheikhan tribes.. He completed his matriculation at Government High School, Nawagai. Later, he studied Islamic theology, graduating in Dars-i Nizami in 1999.

He completed his matriculation from Government High School Nawagai before pursuing religious education.

- 1992–1998: He studied at the madrasa of Maulana Obaidullah Shaheed Chitrali.
- 1999: He graduated from the madrasa "Imdad al-Uloom" and Masjid Darwesh in Peshawar, where he was a student of Maulana Hassan Jan Shaheed. He later obtained a master's-equivalent degree in religious studies from Wifaq-ul-Madaris.

== Career ==
=== Religious and academic ===
Khan Zeb was a disciple of Sheikh‑ul‑Hadith Maulana Hassan Jan. He authored a Pashto book on Bajaur's culture and history. He also contributed to Daily Shahbaz, Tribal News Network, and Pakhtoon Magazine, alongside active social media engagement. In his book on the history of Bajaur district, spanning 4,000 years, he proposed the name of the district to be derived from Baaj (a certain tax on crops) and Warr (to give); with the combined term equaling tax giver.

After completing his religious education, Maulana Khanzeb dedicated his life to the service of religion and social welfare.

==== Teaching ====
For six years, he taught without pay at Darul Uloom Rehmania in his native area, Nawagai.

==== Sermons and Imamate ====
He served as the agha and Imam of his neighborhood mosque in Nawagai for 27 years without a salary. He also served as the Imam for Friday and Eid prayers at the Jamia Mosque in Ziarat Baba, Safi area, Mohmand District for three years.

==== Quranic teachings ====
For 27 years, he taught the translation of the Quran daily after the Isha prayer. He also gave translation lessons during Ramadan and maintained a weekly schedule of Quranic recitation.

=== Political career ===
Maulana Khanzeb was an active member and leader of the Awami National Party (ANP). He had joined the secular, Pashtun‑centred Awami National Party, serving as secretary of ulema affairs and member of its central cabinet.

==== Electoral politics ====
He actively participated in the election campaigns of his elder brother, Sheikh Jahanzaib, in the 2002, 2008, and 2019 elections. In the 2024 general elections, he himself ran for the National Assembly from Bajaur on an ANP ticket but was unsuccessful. He had contested for NA-8 Bajaur in 2024 Pakistani general election, securing more than 12,000 votes, despite his loss.

==== Party role ====
He was a member of the ANP's provincial election commission and served as the Secretary of Scholars in the party's central cabinet. He was also active in party organizational matters and Jirgas.

=== Economics ===
Economically and socially, he was involved in the honey business and served as the president of the Nawagai Bazaar for six years. He was also an active farmer.

=== Peace efforts ===
Maulana Khanzeb dedicated his life to establishing peace in the region. Despite the volatile security situation in Bajaur and other tribal areas, he and his family remained in their native village, even after their house was hit by a rocket, which injured several family members. He organized several Jirgas and protests to open trade routes between Pakistan and Afghanistan and promote peace in the region. He supported national reconciliation and non-interference in Afghanistan's internal affairs.

On 10 July 2025, Maulana Khanzeb was campaigning for the "Aman Pasun" (Peace Protest) movement in various bazaars of Bajaur. During his visit to the district headquarters in Khar (Shandi Mor), he was killed in an attack by anti-peace militants. Soldier Sherzada was also killed in the attack, while Dr. Tariq, Usman Khan, Sheikh Shahsawar, and Sajid Salar survived. His death was considered a great loss for the Pashtun community and the Awami National Party. He is widely remembered as a symbol of peace in Bajaur.

== Assassination ==
On 10 July 2025, while campaigning for the “Aman Pasoon” (peace march) scheduled for 13 July, he was ambushed by motorcycle-riding gunmen on Shindai Mor road near Khar, Bajaur. A policeman (his guard) was also killed, and three civilians were critically injured. No group immediately claimed responsibility, and investigations by Khyber Pakhtunkhwa authorities are ongoing.

=== Reactions and aftermath ===
The Awami National Party (ANP) declared three days of mourning, hoisting black flags at party offices. ANP President Aimal Wali Khan, KP President Mian Iftikhar Hussain, and Chief Minister KP Ali Amin Gandapur strongly condemned the attack and demanded swift justice. The Human Rights Commission of Pakistan described him as "a leading peace campaigner and political leader of the ANP." PM Shehbaz Sharif also expressed grief over his assassination.

Protests ensued in Bajaur, with public outrage directed at the perceived resurgence of militant influence and government inaction.

== Literary works ==
- خانزېب, مولانا (2024). شتمنه پښتونخوا : د پښتونخوا د قدرتى وسائلو علمى، سائنسى او سياسى لوست / Shtamanah Puṣhtūnkhwā : da Puṣhtūnkhwā da qudratī wasāʼilo ʻilmī, sāʼinsī aw siyāsī lwast (in Pashto). Peshawar: مفکوره ريسرچ اينڈ ڈويلپمنٹ سنټر (Mafkūrah Research & Development Center). p. 184. ISBN 9789692110457. OCLC 1461846268.
- خانزېب, مولانا (2020). The History of Bajaur باجوړ د تاريخ پۀ رڼا کښې (in Pashto). Peshawar: Mafkūrah مفکوره ريسرچ اينڈ ڈويلپمنٹ سنټر. p. 440. ISBN 9789697500079.
