= TNN =

TNN may refer to:

- TNN (American TV channel), an American television network with multiple iterations
- Tainan Airport (IATA airport code TNN), Tainan, Taiwan
- Times News Network, a news agency started by The Times of India
- TNN Bass Tournament of Champions, fishing video game
- TNN Motorsports Hardcore Heat, racing video game
- TNN Radio, an American radio station in Anaheim, California
- TNN (Thai TV channel), a Thai news channel
- Tribal News Network, a Pakistani news network

== See also ==
- TN (disambiguation)
- TN2 (disambiguation)
- T2N (disambiguation)
