= PK-19 Bajaur-I =

Constituency of the Provincial Assembly of Khyber Pakhtunkhwa

- Constituency for the Khyber Pakhtunkhwa Assembly
- Region: Loi Mamund Tehsil and Wara Mamund Tehsil (partly) of Bajaur District

Current constituency
- Created: 2018
- Party: Pakistan Tehreek-e-Insaf
- Member: Anwar Zeb Khan
- Created from: PK-100 Bajaur-I (2018-2023); PK-18 Bajaur-I (2023-)

PK-19 Bajaur-I (پی کے-19 باجوڑ-1) is a constituency for the Khyber Pakhtunkhwa Assembly of the Khyber Pakhtunkhwa province of Pakistan. It was created in 2018 after the merger of FATA with Khyber Pakhtunkhwa before the 2019 elections.

== Members of Assembly ==
=== 2019-2023: PK-100 Bajaur-I ===
Election	Member	Party
2019	Anwar Zeb Khan	Pakistan Tehreek-e-Insaf

== Election 2019 ==
After merger of FATA with Khyber Pakhtunkhwa provincial elections were held for the very first time. Pakistan Tehreek-e-Insaf candidate Anwar Zeb Khan won the seat by getting 12,995 votes.

Provincial election 2019: PK-100 Bajaur-I
Party	Candidate	Votes	%
PTI	Anwar Zeb Khan	12,995	25.35
JI	Wahid Gul	11,836	23.09
ANP	Gul Afzal	8,822	17.21
JUI (F)	Abdur Rasheed	8,473	16.53
PML(N)	Israr uddin Khan	5,157	10.06
PPP	Hazoor Khan	3,140	6.13
Independent	Sher Muhammad Khan	353	0.69
PSP	Waheed Zaman	213	0.42
JUI-S	Sher Ahmed	136	0.27
Independent	3 Candidates	130	0.25
Turnout		52,493	33.60
Valid ballots		51,255	97.64
Rejected ballots		1,238	2.36
Majority		1,159	2.26
Registered electors		1,56,237	
PTI win (new seat)			

== See also ==
- PK-18 Lower Dir-V
- PK-20 Bajaur-II
