= 2025 Bajaur bombing =

2025 bombing in Bajaur, Pakistan

- Part of Insurgency in Khyber Pakhtunkhwa and Terrorism in Pakistan
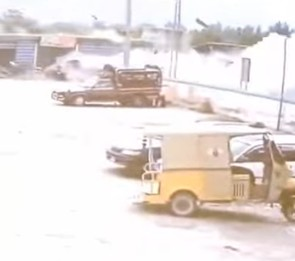
- Ismail's vehicle is seen skidding along the road leftwards, leaving a plume of smoke in its wake, captured from a nearby CCTV camera
- Location: Nawagai Road, Khar Tehsil, Bajaur District, Khyber Pakhtunkhwa, Pakistan
- Date: 2 July 2025; ~1:45 p.m. PST (UTC+05:00)
- Target: Government vehicle carrying Pakistan Assistant Commissioner (AC) of Nawagai Faisal Ismail
- Attack type: Bombing, terrorism
- Weapon: Remotely-detonated IED
- Deaths: 5 total: Faisal Ismail (Pakistan AC); Abdul Wakeel Khan (Nawagai tehsildar); Noor Hakeem (Levies official); Zahid Khan (police officer); Fazal Manan (passerby)
- Injuries: 17
- Perpetrator: Islamic State

The 2025 Bajaur bombing was a roadside bomb attack that occurred on 2 July 2025 in the Nawagai area of Bajaur District, located in Khyber Pakhtunkhwa, Pakistan. An IED exploded under a government vehicle carrying senior administrative officers, resulting in multiple fatalities and injuries.

== Attack ==
The explosion detonated around 1:45 p.m. near Sadiqabad Phatak on Nawagai Road in Khar Tehsil.

The bomb targeted a convoy of government officials, killing all those onboard, a nearby civilian, and wounding others.

== Aftermath ==
Police officials initially suspected the involvement of the Deobandi jihadist militant organization, Tehrik-i-Taliban Pakistan (TTP). The day after the attack, 3 July, the Islamic State (IS) claimed responsibility for the attack.

== Response ==
=== Domestic ===
President of Pakistan Asif Ali Zardari condemned the blast, expressed sorrow over the loss of lives, and offered prayers for the injured.
