= T2N =

T2N may refer to:

- Postal code T2N, a Canadian postal code in Calgary, Alberta; see List of postal codes of Canada: T
- Naval Aircraft Factory T2N, a U.S. Navy interwar torpedo bomber developed by Martin, a variant of the BM
- T2N Media, a South Korean production company responsible for Crash Landing on You

== See also ==
- TN (disambiguation)
- TTN (disambiguation)
- TNN (disambiguation)
- TN2 (disambiguation)
