= TTN =

TTN may refer to:

- Tamil Television Network, a former Tamil language satellite channel
- TV Today Network, an English-Hindi news television network
- The Temple News, the student-run newspaper at Temple University
- The Things Network in low-power wide-area network, see Internet of things
- TinyaToxiN, a highly irritant analog of resiniferatoxin and capsaicin
- TTN (gene), the gene that encodes the protein 'titin', once the largest known protein
- Totton railway station (station code TTN), Hampshire, England, UK
- Toxic thyroid nodule
- Transient tachypnea of the newborn
- Trenton–Mercer Airport (IATA airport code TTN), West Trenton, Ewing, Mercer, New Jersey, USA
- ttn, an Australian children's news program

== See also ==
- TN (disambiguation)
- T2N (disambiguation)
