= TN2 =

TN2 or TN-2 may refer to:

- Tennessee's 2nd congressional district
- Tennessee State Route 2
- TN status, a special immigration status in the United States
- TN2, a postcode district in Tunbridge Wells, England; see TN postcode area
- TN2, a student-run magazine at Trinity College Dublin

== See also ==
- TN (disambiguation)
- T2N (disambiguation)
- TNN (disambiguation)
