= Sardar Khan =

Sardar Khan may refer to:

- Sardar Khan (Pakistan Muslim League (N) politician) (fl. from 2018)
- Sardar Khan (Jamaat-e-Islami politician) (fl. from 2024)
- Sardar Khan, son of Mohammad Daoud Khan
- Sardar Khan (died 1684), minister of Ahmedabad, buried in Sardar Khan's Roza
- Sardar Khan, fictional character in the 2012 Indian film Gangs of Wasseypur, portrayed by Manoj Bajpayee
