= Hamid Ur Rehman =

Pakistani politician

Member of the Provincial Assembly of Khyber Pakhtunkhwa
- Incumbent
- Assumed office 29 February 2024
- Constituency: PK-19 Bajaur-I

Personal details
- Born: Bajaur District, Khyber Pakhtunkhwa, Pakistan
- Party: PTI (2024–present)

Hamid Ur Rehman is a Pakistani politician from Bajaur District. He is currently serving as a member of the Provincial Assembly of Khyber Pakhtunkhwa since February 2024. He was elected to the assembly for the first time in the 2024 Pakistani general election.

== Early life and education ==
Hamid Ur Rehman earned a Master of Science (M.Sc.) degree in Zoology in 2004. He completed a Diploma in Homeopathic Medical Science (DHMS) in 2005 and later obtained a degree in International Relations in 2016.

== Career ==
Before entering the provincial assembly, Hamid Ur Rehman worked in the private sector and served in various social sector organizations.

He began his political career in 2003. In 2008, he served as President of the Insaaf Doctors Forum. In 2013, he served as Planning Coordinator of the Pakistan Tehreek-e-Insaf (PTI).

He contested the 2024 general elections as a Pakistan Tehreek-e-Insaf-backed independent candidate from PK-19 Bajaur-I. He secured 23,044 votes and was elected as a member of the Provincial Assembly of Khyber Pakhtunkhwa.
