= 2026 Bajaur attack =

Attack on a security checkpoint in Pakistan

- Location: Bajaur District, Khyber Pakhtunkhwa, Pakistan
- Date: February 16, 2026
- Attack type: VBIED followed by small-arms assault
- Deaths: 24 (11 security personnel, 1 civilian, 12 attackers)
- Injuries: 7 (including women and children)
- Victims: Pakistani security forces and civilians
- Perpetrator: Pakistani Taliban

On 16 February 2026, a suicide vehicle bombing was followed by a small-arms assault on a security checkpoint in Bajaur District, Khyber Pakhtunkhwa, Pakistan. The attack killed 11 security personnel and one child, and wounded seven others. Pakistani security forces killed 12 militants during the incident. The Pakistani Taliban (Tehreek-e-Taliban Pakistan – TTP) claimed responsibility.

== Background ==
Bajaur District, located along the Pakistan–Afghanistan border in Khyber Pakhtunkhwa province, has historically been a stronghold of the TTP. Pakistan has experienced a surge in attacks on security forces since the Taliban's return to power in Afghanistan in 2021, with many incidents attributed by Islamabad to TTP militants operating from Afghan territory.

== Attack ==
The attack occurred on the night of 16 February 2026 at a security checkpoint in Bajaur District near the Afghan border. Militants drove an explosives-laden vehicle towards the checkpoint. After security forces signalled it to stop and blocked an attempt to enter a residential compound for soldiers, the vehicle was rammed into the wall of the checkpoint, causing part of the compound to collapse. The blast killed 11 security personnel and a young girl when a nearby civilian building collapsed. Seven other civilians, including women and children, were wounded.

A group of militants then attempted to infiltrate the post, triggering a shootout in which Pakistani security forces killed 12 attackers.

== Aftermath and reactions ==
Pakistan attributed the attack to the TTP, which operates from bases in Afghanistan according to Islamabad. On 18–19 February 2026, the Pakistani Foreign Ministry summoned the Afghan deputy head of mission in Islamabad and delivered a strong demarche protesting the use of Afghan territory by insurgents. The ministry condemned "in the strongest possible terms the vehicle-borne suicide terrorist attack followed by a fire raid carried out by Fitna al-Khawarij/TTP", and stated that Pakistan "reserves the right to respond and eliminate any Khwarij [militants ...] wherever they are located".

== See also ==
- Terrorist incidents in Pakistan in 2026
