= Wahid Gul =

Pakistani politician

Personal details
- Born: Bajaur District, Khyber Pakhtunkhwa, Pakistan
- Political party: Jamaat-e-Islami

Wahid Gul is a Pakistani politician from Bajaur District.

== Career ==
He contested the 2024 general elections as a candidate of Jamaat-e-Islami from PK-20 Bajaur-II. He secured 6,869 votes. he was defeated by Anwar Zeb Khan of Pakistan Tehreek-e-Insaf/Independent who secured 12,917 votes.
