= Tribal News Network =

Pakistani Radio

The Tribal News Network, known on air as TNN, is a radio and internet news agency based in Peshawar, the capital of the Khyber Pakhtunkhwa province of Pakistan.

TNN produces radio bulletins in the Pashto language, about news, current affairs and social issues. These bulletins are broadcast on ten partner radio stations throughout Khyber Pakhtunkhwa, which now includes the former Federally Administered Tribal Areas (FATA), Balochistan and into the border regions of Afghanistan. News is also reported in Urdu and in English on TNN’s website. In August 2016, TNN also began broadcasting 2-minute news bulletins via mobile phone.

TNN produces two main news bulletins each day and employs 35 local journalists including 6 women. It has correspondents reporting from all districts of Khyber Pakhtunkhwa and FATA.

== History ==
TNN’s first bulletin went to air on November 9, 2013. TNN is officially registered under the Companies Ordinance, 1984 with the Security Exchange Commission of Pakistan. In 2015, TNN was runner-up in the special award category of the One World Media Awards. In 2015, TNN was recognised by the Geuzenpennning Foundation as a tribute to individuals or institutions that have “devoted themselves to fighting for democracy or against dictatorship, discrimination and racism.”

== Availability ==
TNN's bulletins are broadcast on:

1. Radio Tehzeeb – FM 91.6 in Khyber Agency
2. Radio Dilber – FM 93 in Charsadda district
3. Radio Dilber – FM 94 in Swabi district
4. Radio Lakki – FM 88 in Lakki Marwat district
5. Radio Global – FM 91 in Dera Ismail Khan district
6. [Radio Chiltan] – FM 88 in Quetta
7. Radio Voice of Time – FM 105.6 Hassan Abdal district
8. Radio Shamal – FM 98.6 Bajaur Agency
9. Radio Tawheed – FM 89.3 Kunar province, Afghanistan
10. Radio Speenghar – FM 89.4 Nangarhar Afghanistan

== See also ==
- Al Jazeera Documentary
- TERP University of Maryland
- Free Press Unlimited
- Dawn TV
- Christian Science Monitor
- LA Times
