= Sardar Khan (Jamaat-e-Islami politician) =

Member of the Provincial Assembly of Khyber Pakhtunkhwa
- Incumbent
- Assumed office February 2024
- Constituency: PK-21 Bajaur-III

Personal details
- Born: Bajaur District, Khyber Pakhtunkhwa, Pakistan
- Political party: Jamaat-e-Islami

Sardar Khan is a Pakistani politician from Bajaur District. He is currently serving as member of the Provincial Assembly of Khyber Pakhtunkhwa since February 2024.

== Career ==
He contested the 2024 general elections as a Jamaat-e-Islami candidate from PK-21 Bajaur-III. He secured 16,844 votes while the runner-up was Ajmal Khan of Pakistan Tehreek-e-Insaf/Independent who secured 15,713 votes.
