= Nawagai, Bajaur =

Nawagai
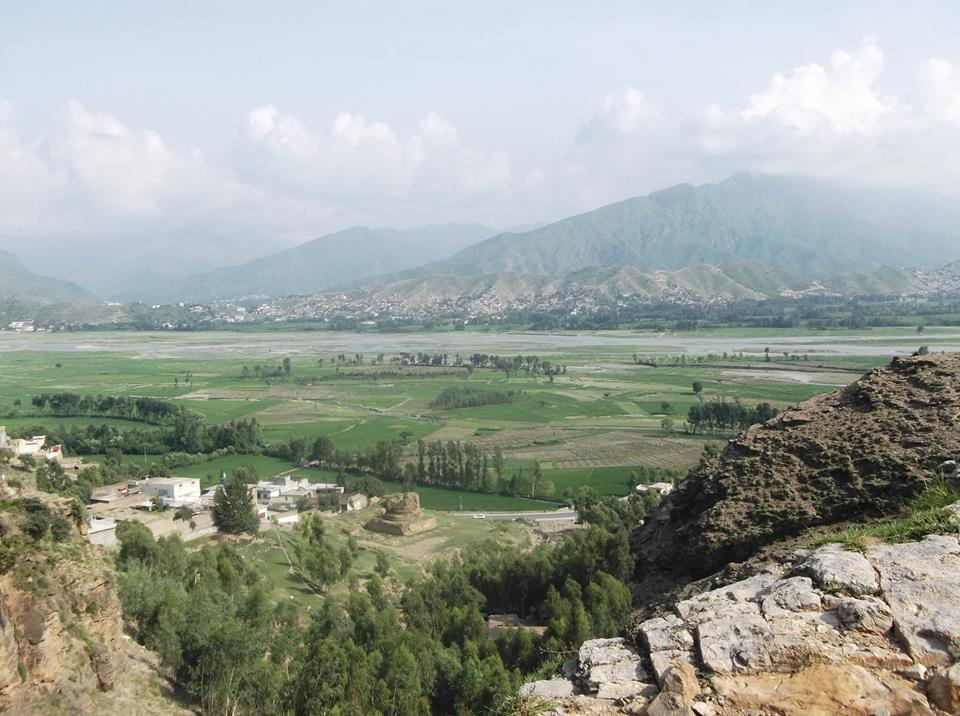

- Location within FATA Location within Pakistan
- Coordinates: 34.74°N 71.53°E
- Country: Pakistan
- Province: Federally Administered Tribal Areas
- District: Bajaur Agency
- Tehsil: Nawagai
- Time zone: UTC+5 (PST)

Nawagai is a town in the Bajaur Agency of the Federally Administered Tribal Areas of Pakistan. It lies on the border with Afghanistan. The Bajur Scouts headquarters is also located in the town. The "Civil colony" is located in this town and this place is the court of Bajaur controlled by a political agent.
