= Anwar Zeb Khan =

Pakistani politician

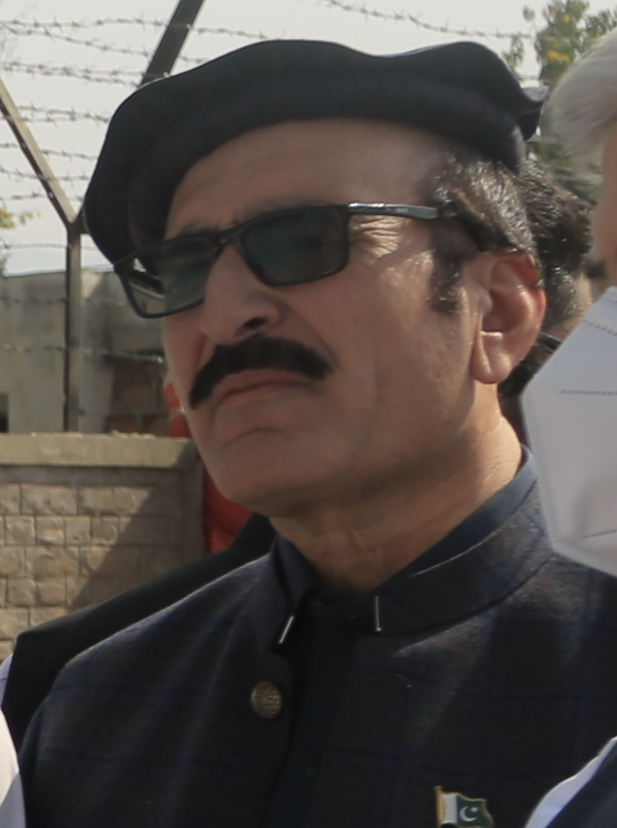
- Anwar Zeb Khan

Provincial Minister of Khyber Pakhtunkhwa for Zakat Usher & Social Welfare, Special Education and Women Empowerment
- In office 3 September 2020 – 18 January 2023
- Chief Minister: Mahmood Khan

Member of the Provincial Assembly of Khyber Pakhtunkhwa
- In office 27 August 2019 – 18 January 2023
- Constituency: PK-100 (Bajaur-I)

Personal details
- Party: PTI (2019-present)

Anwar Zeb Khan is a Pakistani politician who was the Provincial Minister of Khyber Pakhtunkhwa for Zakat Usher & Social Welfare Special Education and Women Empowerment, in office from 3 September 2020 to January 2023. He had been a member of the Provincial Assembly of Khyber Pakhtunkhwa from 27 August 2019 to 18 January 2023.

== Political career ==
Khan contested the 2019 Khyber Pakhtunkhwa provincial election on 20 July 2019 from constituency PK-100 (Bajaur-I) on the ticket of Pakistan Tehreek-e-Insaf. He won the election by the majority of 1,176 votes over the runner up Waheed Gul of Jamaat-e-Islami Pakistan. He garnered 12,951 votes while Gul received 11,775 votes. He was inducted into Khyber Pakhtunkhwa Cabinet on 3 September 2020.
