= TN =

Tn or TN may refer to:

== Businesses and organizations ==
- Air Tahiti Nui (IATA airline designation "TN" since 1998), a French Polynesian airline
- Texas and Northern Railway, an American railway (reporting mark "TN")
- Todo Noticias, an Argentine cable news network
- Trans Australia Airlines (IATA airline designation "TN" until 1994), a defunct Australian airline
- Transports en commun de Neuchâtel et environs, a public transport operator in Neuchâtel, Switzerland

== Places ==
- Tamil Nadu, a state in southern India (ISO abbreviation "IN-TN")
- Tennessee, US (postal abbreviation "TN")
- Tonbridge, a region in England (postcode "TN")
- Tunisia (ISO 3166-1 country code "TN")
- Trentino, a province in Italy (ISO abbreviation "IT-TN")
- North Tipperary, a former county of Ireland (car plate code "TN")

== Science and technology ==
- .tn, the country code top level domain (ccTLD) for Tunisia
- TN network, a type of earthing system for protection in electricity network
- Neel Temperature, the temperature at which an antiferromagnetic material becomes paramagnetic (represented as T_{N})
- Tetraodon, a genus of pufferfish
- Trigeminal neuralgia, a neuropathic disorder
- Transposon (when immediately followed by a number), a DNA sequence that can change positions
- Twisted nematic field effect, the technology that made LCD displays practical
- Thoron, symbol Tn, a sometimes used name for the nuclide radon-220

== Other uses ==
- TN status ("Treaty national", or "Trade NAFTA"), an immigration status of a Canadian or Mexican citizen working in the USA under the NAFTA agreement
- Telephone number, in the telecommunications industry
- Tom Next (or Tomorrow Next), a financial trade which starts tomorrow and settles in the next trading day
- Trillion ("TN" or "tn"), a number equal to 10^{12} (short scale) or 10^{18} (long scale)
- Truck nuts, a vehicular novelty accessory resembling a dangling scrotum
- Tswana language (ISO 639-1 language code)
- Translator's Note ("TN" or "t/n")
- Turbonave, an Italian ship prefix, indicating that the ship was propelled by a turbine engine.
- Tobu's Nikko Line, Utsunomiya Line, and Kinugawa Line (railway line prefix TN)
