= Bajaur District =

Bajaur District ضلع باجوڑ باجوړ ولسوالۍ
- District
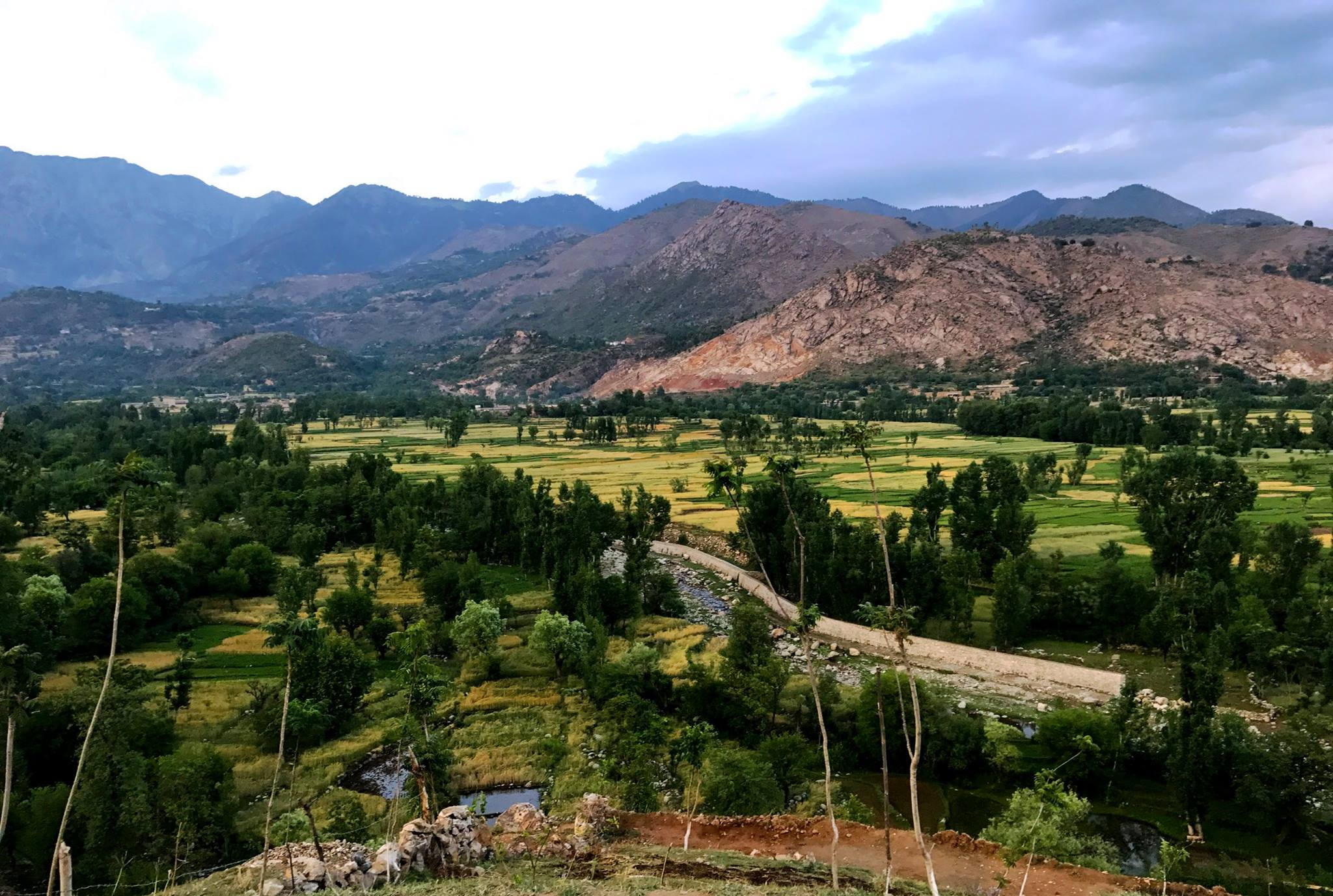
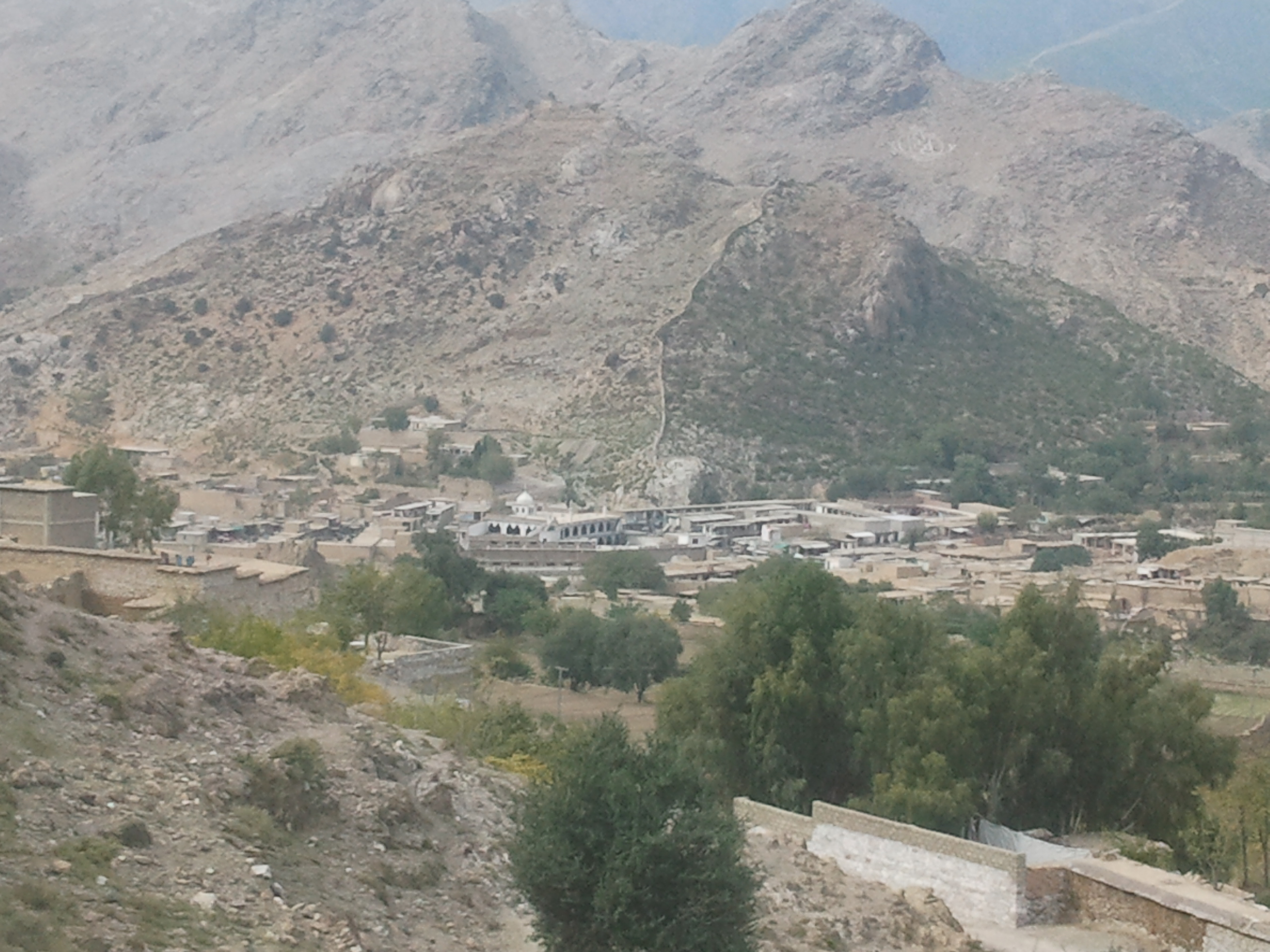
- View of Bajaur; Bottom: View of Guluna

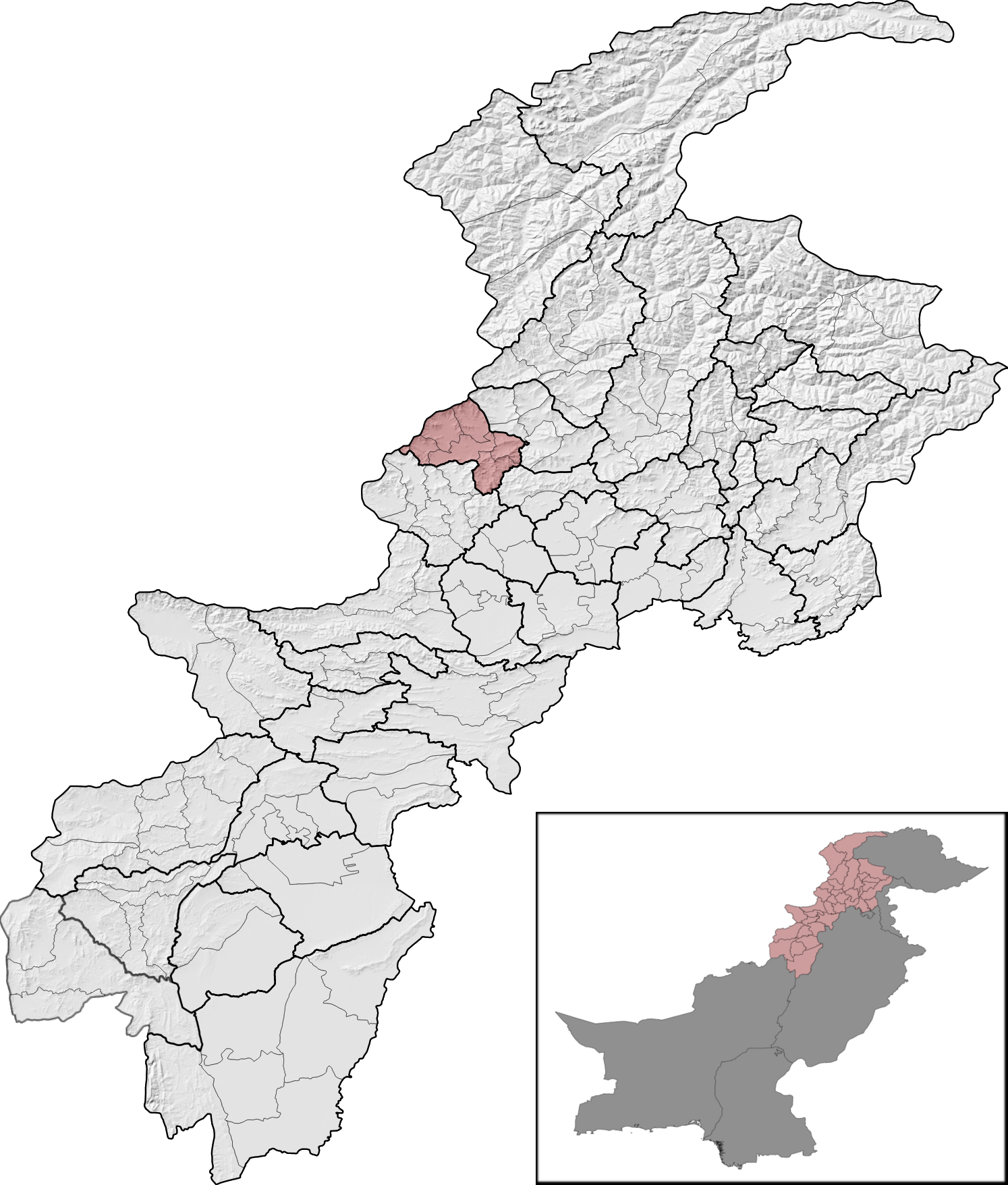
- Bajaur District (red) in Khyber Pakhtunkhwa
- Coordinates: 34°41′N 71°30′E
- Country: Pakistan
- Province: Khyber Pakhtunkhwa
- Division: Malakand
- Administration HQ: Khar

Government
  - Type: District Administration
  - Deputy Commissioner: Muhammad Anwar-ul-Haq

Area
  - District: 1,290 km^{2} (500 sq mi)

Population (2023)
  - District: 1,287,960
  - Density: 998.2/km^{2} (2,585/sq mi)
  - Urban: 0
  - Rural: 1,287,960
- Demonym: Bajauri

Literacy
  - Literacy rate: Total: 26.26%; Male: 39.89%; Female: 12.29%
- Time zone: UTC+5 (PST)
  - Summer (DST): UTC+6 (PDT)
- Main language: Pashto
- Number of Tehsils: 7
- Website: bajaur.kp.gov.pk

Bajaur District (Pashto: باجوړ ولسوالۍ, Urdu: ضلع باجوڑ), formerly Bajaur Agency, is a district in the Malakand Division of Khyber Pakhtunkhwa Province, Pakistan. Prior to 2018, Bajaur Agency was the northernmost component of the Federally Administered Tribal Areas (FATA), a semi-autonomous region along the Afghanistan–Pakistan border. In May 2018, FATA was merged into the larger Khyber Pakhtunkhwa Province (KPK) in an attempt to bring stability to the region, redesignating Bajaur Agency to Bajaur District.

The district lies on Pakistan's western border, sharing a 52 km border with Afghanistan's Kunar Province, and lies 35 mi (56 km) north of the Torkham border crossing linking Jalalabad and Peshawar. 498 square kilometers in size, Bajaur occupies a small mountain basin and is into seven tehsil (subdistricts) with its district headquarters in the town of Khar, in the district's center.

== Geography ==
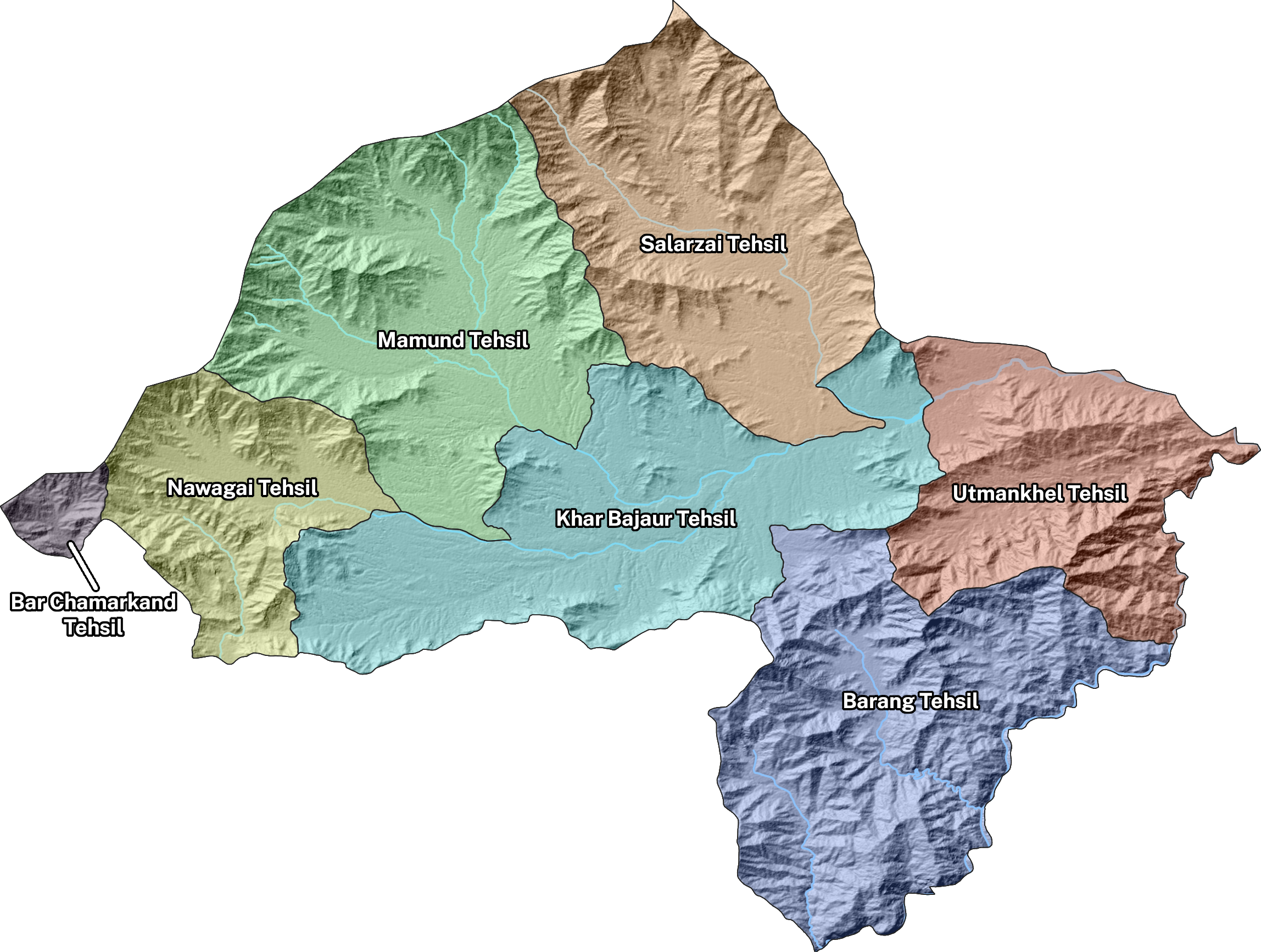
Map of Bajaur District tehsils

Before the 2018 incorporation of the Federally Administered Tribal Areas' (FATA) tribal agencies into Khyber Pakhtunkhwa Province (KPK), Bajaur Agency was both the northernmost and smallest of the seven tribal agencies, bordering the slightly larger Kurram Agency to its south.

Bajaur is about 72 kilometres (45 mi) long and 32 kilometres (20 mi) wide. It lies at a high elevation to the east of the Kunar Valley of Afghanistan from which it is separated by a continuous line of rugged frontier hills. The old road from Afghanistan's Kabul to Pakistan went through Bajaur before a new pass, Khyber Pass, was constructed. To the south of Bajaur is the district of Mohmand. To the east, beyond the Panjkora River, are the hills of Swat District. On its east side, there is the district of Malakand, while on its northeast is an intervening watershed between Bajaur and Dir.

Nawagai is the chief town of Bajaur; the Khan of Nawagai was previously under the British protection for the purpose of safeguarding of the Chitral road.

The drainage of Bajaur flows eastwards, starting from the eastern slopes of the dividing ridge, which overlooks the Kunar and terminating in the Panjkora river, so that the district lies on a slope tilting gradually downwards from the Kunar ridge to the Panjkora.

== History ==
=== Ancient period ===
The area was the site of the ancient Gandhara kingdom of Apraca from the 1st century BCE to the 1st century CE, and a stronghold of the Aspasioi, a western branch of the Ashvakas (q.v) of the Sanskrit texts who had earlier offered stubborn resistance to the Macedonian invader Alexander the Great in 326 BCE. The whole region came under Kushan control after the conquests of Kujula Kadphises during the first century CE.

Alexander turned south from Aornus and continued march towards the Indus, but the greatest surprise during the march came when he neared the town of Nysa (former name of Bajaur). The local people and even the flora seemed strangely out of place in these mountains. The Nysains placed their dead in cedar coffin in the trees - some of which Alexander accidentally set on fire - and made wine from grapes, unlike other tribes in the area. The Acuphis, the chief man of the city, who has been sent to them along with other thirty leaders, begged him not to harm their towns as they were descendants of settlers that the god Dionysus placed their generation before. Their prolific ivy, a plant sacred to Dionysus that nowhere else in the mountain, was proof they were the people blessed by god. Then they were only commanded to give him 300 cavalry, after which he restored their freedom and allow them to live under their own laws, having made Acuphis governor of the city. Alexander took his son and grandson as hostages. He sacrificed there to Bacchus under this god's others name of Dionysus.

The Bajaur casket, also called the Indravarma reliquary, year 63, or sometimes referred to as the Avaca inscription, is an ancient reliquary from the area of Bajaur in ancient Gandhara, in the present-day Federally Administered Tribal Areas of Pakistan. It is dated to around 5-6 CE. It proves the involvement of the Scythian kings of the Apraca, in particular King Indravarman, in Buddhism. The casket is made of schist.

=== Mughal period ===
==== Bajaur massacre ====
In 1518, Babur had invested and conquered the fortress of Bajaur, The Gabar-Kot from Sultan Mir Haider Ali Gabari the Jahangirian Sultan and gone on to conquer Bhera on the river Jhelum, a little beyond the salt ranges. Babur claimed these areas as his own, because they had been part of Taimur's empire. Hence, "picturing as our own the countries once occupied by the Turks", he ordered that "there was to be no overrunning or plundering [of the countryside]". It may be noted that this applied to areas which did not offer resistance, because earlier, at Bajaur, where the Pashtun tribesmen had resisted, he had ordered a general massacre, with their women and children being made captive.

Babur justifies this massacre by saying, "the Bajauris were rebels and at enmity with the people of Islam, and as, by heathenish and hostile customs prevailing in their midst, the very name of Islam was rooted out...".

As the Bajauris were rebels and inimical to the people of Islam, the men were subjected to a general massacre and their wives and children were made captive. At a guess, more than 3,000 men met their death. We entered the fort and inspected it. On the walls, in houses, streets and alleys, the dead lay, in what numbers! Those walking around had to jump over the corpses. (Note: Thomas Holdich writing in 1911 in Encyclopædia Britannica (11th ed.) stated that "The Gazetteers and Reports of the Indian government contain nearly all the modern information available about Bajour. The autobiography of Baber (by Leyden and Erskine) gives interesting details about the country in the 16th century. For the connexion between the Kafirs and the ancient Nysaeans of Swat, see R. G. S. Journal, vol. vii., 1896" (Holdich 1911).)

==== Battle of Malandari Pass ====
From late 1585 into 1586, forces of the Mughal army led by Zain Khan Koka, at the direction of the Mughal emperor Akbar the Great, waged a military campaign to subdue the Yusufzai tribes of Bajaur and Swat. The Mughal operation, which culminated in the Battle of the Malandari Pass resulted in an Afghan victory and a military embarrassment for Akbar.

=== Later period ===
Jandol, one of the northern valleys of Bajaur, has ceased to be of political importance since the 19th century, when a previous chief, Umra Khan, failed to appropriate himself Bajaur, Dir and a great part of the Kunar valley. It was the active hostility between the Amir of Kabul (who claimed sovereignty of the same districts) and Umra Khan that led, firstly to the demarcation agreement of 1893 which fixed the boundary of Afghanistan in Kunar; and, secondly, to the invasion of Chitral by Umra Khan (who was no party to the boundary settlement), and the siege of the Chitral fort in 1895.

Bajaur was a princely state run by the Nawab of Khar. The last and most prominent Nawab was Abdul Subhan Khan, who ruled until 1990.

During the Soviet invasion in the 1980s, the area was a critical staging ground for Afghan and local mujahideen to organise and conduct raids. It had hosted a large population of Afghan refugees sympathetic to Gulbuddin Hekmatyar, a Mujahideen leader ideologically close to the Arab militants. During the War in Afghanistan (2001–2021), the United States believed that militants based in Bajaur, frequently launched attacks on American, NATO (including the ISAF and RSM) and Afghan troops in Afghanistan.

== Counterterrorism ==
=== Airstrikes ===
An aerial attack, executed by the United States targeting Ayman al-Zawahiri, took place in a village in Bajaur Agency on January 13, 2006, killing 18 people. Al-Zawahiri was not found among the dead and the incident led to severe outrage in the area.

On October 30, 2006, 80 people were killed in Bajaur when Pakistani forces attacked a religious school they said was being used as a militant training camp. There are many unconfirmed reports that the October attack was also carried out by the United States or NATO forces, but was claimed by Islamabad over fears of widespread protest similar to those after the US bombing in January 2006. Maulana Liaqat, the head of the seminary, was killed in the attack. Liaqat was a senior leader of the pro-Taliban movement Tanzim Nifaz Shariat Mohammadi (TNSM), that spearheaded a violent Islamic movement in Bajaur and the neighbouring Malakand areas in 1994. The TNSM had led some 5,000 men from the Pakistani areas of Dir, Swat and Bajaur across the Mamund border into Afghanistan in October 2001, to fight US-led troops. In what is thought to be a reprisal for the October strike in Bajaur, in November, a suicide bomber killed dozens in an attack on an army training school in Khyber-Pakhtunkhwa.

=== Bajaur offensive ===
Loi sum is on a strategic location, road come from four sides, (khar, Nawagi, Tangai and Inzari), so approach was easy from Charmang and Ambar. That was the reason that this area was affected mostly. A military offensive by the military of Pakistan (FC and Leaves) was launched in early 8 August 2008 to retake the border crossing near the town of Loi-Sum, 12 km from khar from militants loyal to Tehrik-e-Taliban, the so-called Pakistani Taliban. In the two weeks following the initial battle, government forces pulled back to Khar and initiated aerial bombing and artillery barrages on presumed militant positions, which reportedly has all but depopulated Bajaur and parts of neighbouring Mohmand Agency, with an estimated 300,000 fleeing their homes. The estimate of casualties ran into the hundreds. The offensive was launched in the wake of Prime Minister Yousuf Raza Gilani's visit to Washington in late July, and is believed by some to be in response to U.S. demands that Pakistan prevent the FATA being used as a safe haven by insurgents fighting American and NATO troops in Afghanistan. However, the offensive was decided by the military, not the civilian government. The bloody bombing of Pakistan Ordnance Factories in Wah on August 21, 2008, came according to Maulvi Omar, a spokesman for the Pakistani Taliban, as a response to the Bajaur offensive. after a few weeks, the Pak army came to battlefield. In an initial way toward the Loi sum Taliban did not resist and let them to come to middle position, when they reach to Rashakai, (3–4 km from Loi sum) Taliban started to attack them but the Army was far stronger than their expectation. For several weeks they stayed in Rashakai, then 1st attempt Army come to loi sum, stay for whole day and come back to Rashakai, In 2nd attempt was the same, and 3rd attempt they come to loi sum and took the control of the area. Army continues there journey, control the main road of Bajaur from Khar to Nawagi, and the peripheral areas were still in the hold of Taliban. After nine months of vigorous clashes between government security forces and Taliban, military forces have finally claimed to have forced militants out of Bajaur Agency, and advanced towards strongholds of Taliban in the region. According to figures provided by the Government of Pakistan, 1,600 militants were killed and more than 2,000 injured, while some 150 civilians also died and about 2,000 were injured in the fighting. The military operation forced more than 300,000 people to flee their homes and take shelter in IDP camps in settled districts of the province. To date, more than 180,000 IDPs have returned to their homes in Bajaur Agency, facing widespread destruction to their lives, livelihoods and massive unemployment. In August, 2012, the Pakistani Army de-listed Bajaur as conflict zone.

=== Media coverage ===
From 2008 through 2010, Al Jazeera English produced multiple features of the ongoing conflict between Pakistani military forces and Taliban militants in the agency.

In early 2013, VICE News founder Shane Smith accompanied and documented a raid on suspected Taliban fighters by the Pakistani Frontier Corps' Bajaur Scouts in Bajaur Agency.

=== Islamic State ===
As of March 2024, the Islamic State's Khorasan Province (ISIS-K) maintains an operational presence in Bajaur, conducting 4 attacks in 2021, 21 attacks in 2022, and 18 in 2023. The majority of ISIS-K attacks in Bajaur occur in Mamond tehsil, followed by Inayat Kali, Salarzo, and Khar tehsils. On 29 July 2025, Pakistan security forces had launched a military operation in Bajaur against the Pakistani Taliban and Islamic State's Khorasan Province.

== Administrative divisions ==
Bajaur District is currently subdivided into seven tehsils (sub-districts).

Tehsil	Area (km²)	Pop. (2023)	Density (ppl/km²) (2023)	Literacy rate (2023)	Union Councils	Location
Bar Chamarkand Tehsil	13	3,574	104.41	23.81%		Western tip
Barang Tehsil	159	90,082	100.27	23.39%		Southeast
Khar Bajaur Tehsil	238	301,778	102.81	33.28%		Central and south-central
Mamund Tehsil	250	358,190	103.29	24.48%		Northwest
Nawagai Tehsil	216	93,850	103.2	27.39%		West
Salarzai Tehsil	220	316,767	101.01	19.90%		North-central
Utman Khel Tehsil	194	123,719	100.66	31.50%		East

== Demographics ==
=== Population ===
Historical population
Year	Pop.	±% p.a.
1951	320,985	—
1961	280,200	−1.35%
1972	364,050	+2.41%
1981	289,206	−2.52%
1998	595,227	+4.34%
2017	1,090,987	+3.24%
2023	1,287,960	+2.80%

As of the 2023 census, Bajaur district has 181,699 households and a population of 1,287,960. The district has a sex ratio of 102.14 males to 100 females and a literacy rate of 26.26%: 39.89% for males and 12.29% for females. 466,054 (36.32% of the surveyed population) are under 10 years of age. The entire population lives in rural areas.

=== Population ===
Overall District	Area	1998 Population	2017 Population	2023 Population	Population Density	Mean Annual Growth
Bajaur District	1,290 km^{2}	595,227	1,090,987	1,287,960	998.4 per km2	▲2.80%
Tehsil	Area	1998 Population	2017 Population	2023 Population	Population Density	Mean Annual Growth
Mamund Tehsil	250 km^{2}	168,283	311,373	358,190	1432.76 per km^{2}	▲2.37%
Salarzai Tehsil	220 km^{2}	141,750	267,636	316,767	1,439.85 per km^{2}	▲2.86%
Khar Bajaur Tehsil	238 km^{2}	116,196	246,875	301,778	1,267.97 per km^{2}	▲3.41%
Utman Khel Tehsil	194 km^{2}	58,348	107,248	123,719	637.73 per km^{2}	▲2.42%
Nawagai Tehsil	216 km^{2}	57,264	78,494	93,850	434.49 per km^{2}	▲3.03%
Barang Tehsil	159 km^{2}	50,139	76,493	90,082	566.55 per km^{2}	▲2.77%
Bar Chamer Kand Tehsil	13 km^{2}	3,247	2,868	3,574	274.92 per km^{2}	▲3.75%
Source: Pakistani Bureau of Statistics (2017 Pakistan Census)(2023 Pakistan Census)

=== Nationality ===
Bajaur District is 99.91% Pakistani with a relatively small population of inhabitants identifying as of a non-Pakistani nationality.

Gender	Pakistani	Pakistani (%)	Other	Other (%)
All	1,281,941	99.91%	1,172	0.09%
Male	647,930	99.92%	543	0.08%
Female	633,996	99.9%	629	0.1%
Transgender	15	100%	0	0%
Source: Pakistani Bureau of Statistics (2023 Pakistan Census)

=== Language ===
The mother tongue of the majority of Bajauris are expectedly 99.85% Pashto, reflective of the indigenous Pashtun (also 'Pakthtun') population that inhabits much of Khyber Pakhtunkhwa (KPK, for which the province derives its name) and eastern Afghanistan. Other residents are first-language Urdu speakers, the national language of Pakistan, while relatively small numbers are native Balochi, Sindhi, Kashmiri, Saraiki, Brahvi (Brahui), and Punjabi speakers.

Overall District	Urdu	Punjabi	Sindhi	Pashto	Balochi	Kashmiri	Saraiki	Hindko	Brahvi	Others
Bajaur District	372	145	86	1,281,221	1,059	15	12	21	1	181
Tehsil	Urdu	Punjabi	Sindhi	Pashto	Balochi	Kashmiri	Saraiki	Hindko	Brahvi	Others
Mamund Tehsil	84	4	22	356,609	383	1	-	1	-	31
Salarzai Tehsil	67	10	19	315,350	257	6	1	-	-	35
Khar Bajaur Tehsil	159	126	31	298,846	182	3	7	19	-	12
Utman Khel Tehsil	22	3	5	123,417	88	1	-	-	-	51
Nawagai Tehsil	20	-	2	93,591	78	2	4	1	1	7
Barang Tehsil	20	2	6	89,837	69	2	-	-	-	45
Bar Chamer Kand Tehsil	-	-	1	3,571	2	-	-	-	-	45
Source: Pakistani Bureau of Statistics (2023 Pakistan Census); Mother tongues only

=== Religion ===
Bajaur District is nearly entirely Muslim.

Overall District	Muslim	Muslim (%)	Christian	Christian (%)	Hindu	Hindu (%)	Ahmadi	Ahmadi (%)	Other	Other (%)
Bajaur District	1,279,889	99.75%	3,068	0.24%	50	~0%	21	~0%	85	0.01%
Tehsil	Muslim	Muslim (%)	Christian	Christian (%)	Hindu	Hindu (%)	Ahmadi	Ahmadi (%)	Other	Other (%)
Mamund Tehsil	355,762	99.62%	1,329	0.37%	15	~0%	11	~0%	18	0.01%
Salarzai Tehsil	314,978	99.76%	716	0.23%	23	0.01%	4	~0%	24	0.01%
Khar Bajaur Tehsil	298,872	99.83%	479	0.16%	7	~0%	1	~0%	26	0.01%
Utman Khel Tehsil	123,365	99.82%	216	0.17%	1	~0%	2	~0%	3	~0%
Nawagai Tehsil	93,466	99.74%	224	0.24%	2	~0%	0	0%	14	0.01%
Barang Tehsil	89,873	99.88%	103	0.11%	2	~0%	3	~0%	0	0%
Bar Chamer Kand Tehsil	3,573	99.97%	1	0.03%	0	0%	0	0%	0	0%
Source: Pakistani Bureau of Statistics (2023 Pakistan Census)

== Governance and politics ==
Constituents of Bajaur District are politically represented locally through elected union councils, town governments, and tehsil governments. The district government includes a deputy commissioner, additional deputy commissioner, two assistant commissioners, tehsildars (heads of tehsil), district agricultural officer, district educational officer, medical superintendent, district coordination officer, assistant director for local government, and district population welfare officer.

=== Provincial Assembly Members ===
At the provincial level, constituents are represented by the Provincial Assembly of Khyber Pakhtunkhwa, an elected unicameral legislature of 145 seats in the provincial capital of Peshawar, with 115 general seats, 26 reserved for women, and 4 reserved for non-Muslims.

==== 12th Provincial Assembly ====
The 8 February 2024 Khyber Pakhtunkhwa provincial election, based on the results of a 2023 digital census, granted Bajaur District a fourth seat in the Provincial Assembly.

A PTI candidate for the new PK-22 Bajaur-IV constituency election, Rehan Zeb Khan, was shot and killed by an ISIS-K attacker while in his car in a market in Bajaur District, leading to the postponement of that constituency's election, as well as in NA-8.

Constituency	Elected Member	Party affiliation	Votes	Contender	Contender Party Affiliation	Votes
PK-19 Bajaur-I	Hamid Ur-Rehman	Independent*	23,044	Khalid Khan	Independent*	13,571
PK-20 Bajaur-II	Wahid Gul	Jamaat-e-Islami Pakistan	13,039	Anwar Zeb Khan	Independent*	12,903
PK-21 Bajaur-III	Sardar Khan	Jamaat-e-Islami Pakistan	16,844	Ajmal Khan	Independent*	15,713
PK-22 Bajaur-IV	Election postponed due to ISIS-K assassination of an independent candidate Rehan Zeb Khan (member of PTI but not given ticket.)					

==== 11th Provincial Assembly ====
Constituency	Member	Age	Date of birth	Religion	Education	Profession	Party affiliation	Term start	Term end
PK-100 Bajaur-I	Anwar Zeb Khan	56	3 April 1970	Islam	Unknown	Landlord	Pakistan Tehreek-e-Insaf	27 August 2019	18 January 2023
PK-101 Bajaur-II	Ajmal Khan	56	15 January 1970	Islam	B.S. Civil Engineering	Business	Pakistan Tehreek-e-Insaf	27 August 2019	18 January 2023
PK-102 Bajaur-III	Siraj Uddin	65	6 June 1961	Islam	B.A. Unknown Major	Unknown	Jamaat-e-Islami Pakistan	27 August 2019	18 January 2023

=== National Assembly Members ===
A PTI candidate for the NA-8 constituency election, Rehan Zeb Khan, was shot and killed by an ISIS-K attacker while in his car in a market in Bajaur District, leading to the postponement of that constituency's election, as well as in NA-8.

15th National Assembly (2018–2023)
Constituency	Elected Member	Party affiliation	Term start	Term end
NA-40 Tribal Area-I	Gul Dad Khan	Pakistan Tehreek-e-Insaf	13 August 2018	9 August 2023
NA-41 Tribal Area-II	Gul Zafar Khan	Pakistan Tehreek-e-Insaf	13 August 2018	9 August 2023
14th National Assembly (2013–2018)
NA-43 Bajaur	Bismillah Khan	Independent	1 June 2013	31 May 2018
NA-44 Bajaur	Shahabuddin Khan	Pakistan Muslim League (N)	1 June 2013	31 May 2018
13th National Assembly (2008–2013)
NA-43 Bajaur	Shaukatullah Khan	Independent	17 March 2008	8 April 2013
NA-44 Bajaur	Akhundzada Chitan	Independent	17 March 2008	16 March 2013
12th National Assembly (2002–2007)
NA-43 Bajaur	Sheikh Alhadees Maulana Muhammad Sadiq	Independent	16 November 2002	15 November 2007
NA-44 Bajaur	Sahibzada Haroon ur-Rashid	Independent	16 November 2002	15 November 2007
11th National Assembly (1997–1999)
NA-32 Tribal Area VI	Haji Lal Karim	Independent	15 February 1997	14 October 1999
10th National Assembly (1993–1996)
NA-32 Tribal Area VI	Bismillah Khan	Independent	15 October 1993	5 November 1996
9th National Assembly (1990–1993)
NA-32 Tribal Area VI	Haji Lal Karim	Independent	3 November 1990	18 July 1993
8th National Assembly (1988–1990)
NA-32 Tribal Area VI	Bismallah Khan	Independent	30 November 1988	6 August 1990
7th National Assembly (1985–1988)
NA-32 Tribal Area VI	Abdul Subhan Khan	Independent	20 March 1985	29 May 1988
6th National Assembly (1977–1977)
NA-32 Tribal Area VI	Abdul Subhan Khan	Independent	28 March 1977	5 July 1977
5th National Assembly (1972–1977)
NW-25 Tribal Area VII	Abdul Subhan Khan	Independent	14 April 1972	10 January 1977
Notes: NW denotes West Pakistan before Bangladeshi (East Pakistan) independence

== Education ==
In Bajaur, the total number of SSC-level schools registered with Malakand Board are 150 (61 government-run, 89 private-run). The number of HSSC-level colleges are 56 (18 government-run, 38 private-run).

=== Education rank ===
In district school education rank of Pakistan, the position of is going downward, according to the Alif Ailaan ranking, the rank of Bajaur in 2014, 2015 and 2016 is the following

Rank/Position	District/Agency	Province/Territory	Education Score	Enrolment score	Learning score	Retention score	Gender Parity score
47(2014)	Bajaur	Khyber Pakhtunkhwa	74.10	75.00	94.77	80.57	46.08
99(2015)	Bajaur	Khyber Pakhtunkhwa	57.43	59.59	34.32	63.25	72.56
131(2016)	Bajaur	Khyber Pakhtunkhwa	42.42	52.80	36.57	20.00	60.32

== Tourism ==
Bajaur is located near swat and District Dir, so the climates of these districts are comparatively same.

=== Koh-i-Mor ===
Koh-i-Mor is the highest peak in Bajaur. It is also called three peak mountain. Its top is covered with snow in winter and clouds are touching its peak. Its history is found 2000 year back, here at the foot of the Koh-i-Mor mountain, that Alexander the Great founded the ancient city of Nysa and the Nysaean colony, traditionally said to have been founded by Dionysus. The Koh-i-Mor has been identified as the Meros of Arrian's history — the three-peaked mountain from which the god issued.

=== Chenarran (platane Orientalis) ===
At the base of Koh-i-Mor a lot of chenar trees along with spring. Locals people are coming here and enjoy the nature, making their own cooking, some have load speakers, music, etc. majority people come along with their families.

=== Gabar Chenna ===
It is situated in Tehsil Salarzai, it has snowy water, It was historically spring, when once here was a undefeated king rested.

=== Charmang Hill ===
The Charmang hills in Bajaur are covered with pine trees and also the roads is made up to top of hill. The road goes on top of hill from bottom to top. In winter, the whole mountain is covered with snow for months.

=== Raghagan DAM ===
Raghagan Dam is situated in Tehsil Salarzai. It a tourist spot nowadays. Boats are present here for tourists.

== Economy ==
=== Agriculture ===
Bajaur is a semi-independent in agriculture field, The soil is fertile but the no proper irrigation system. Harvest Crops; People grow wheat, maze and rices in some areas. All the crops is mainly dependent on rain. Vegetable and Fruits; The different types of vegetables are growing in Bajaur. Potato, tomato, onion, lady fingers, spinach, and orange parsimon, etc

=== Rare earth minerals ===
Marbles are found in various regions, mainly in Inzari and Nawagai. There are different types of marble supper white, Badle etc. In the local areas are marble factories, cut to into different sizes of the base of demand, and supply to all over the country and even abroad main found in the areas of Shaikh kali and Umary. The supply to the factories of marble mainly from the local mountains and they also bring the marble from ambar and Zairat. These different types and variety of marble then supply all over the country.

Nephrite (jade) is the precious stone, found in Inzari and some area in Utmankhail tehsil. It exports mainly to China, The Chinese thought so too, and for thousands of years, nephrite articles had a special value and signature and skilled artisans carved increasingly intricate designs.

=== Olives and olive oil ===
The Government of Khyber Pakhtunkhwa has started olive production projects in the Bajaur district. Previously, many wild olive trees are present in the area having no such importance. They use agricultural techniques to convert these wild trees into more farmer friendly and productive plants. With new projects of planting olive trees on more than 150000 acres of land, the Bajaur district will be the olive hub of Pakistan.

== Gallery ==
Select Photos of Bajaur District
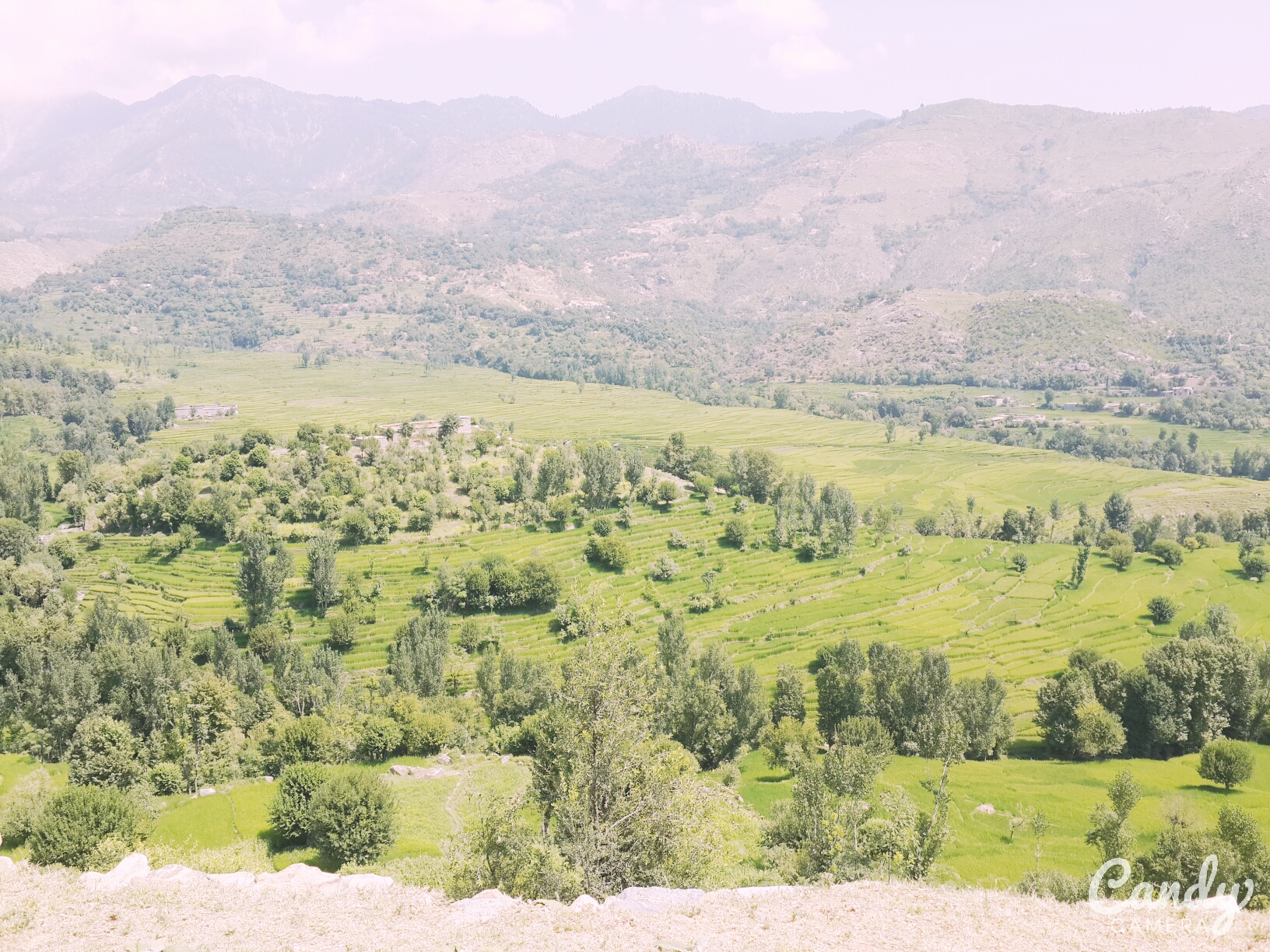
Basin plain

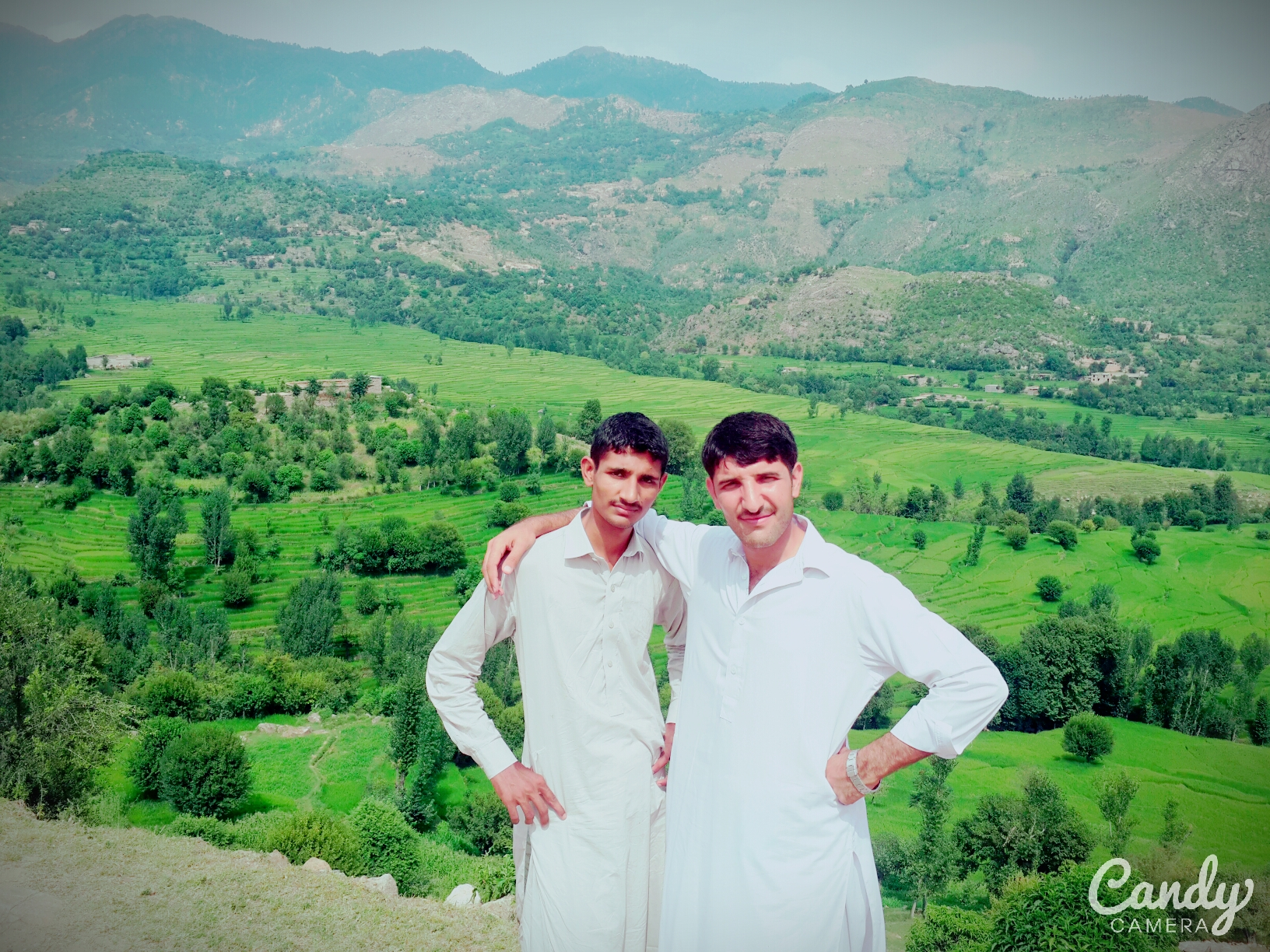
Basin overlook

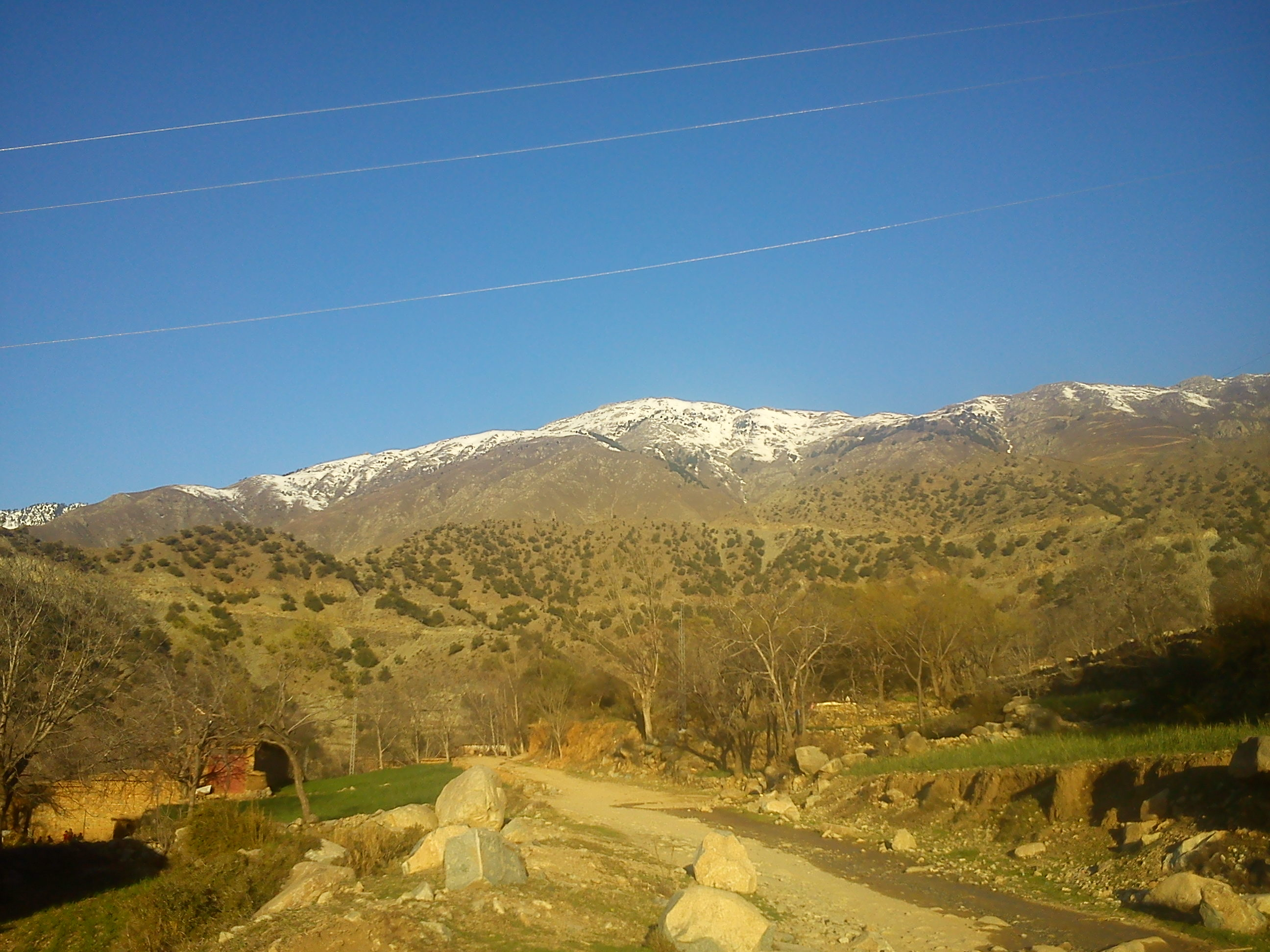
Mountains and drainage

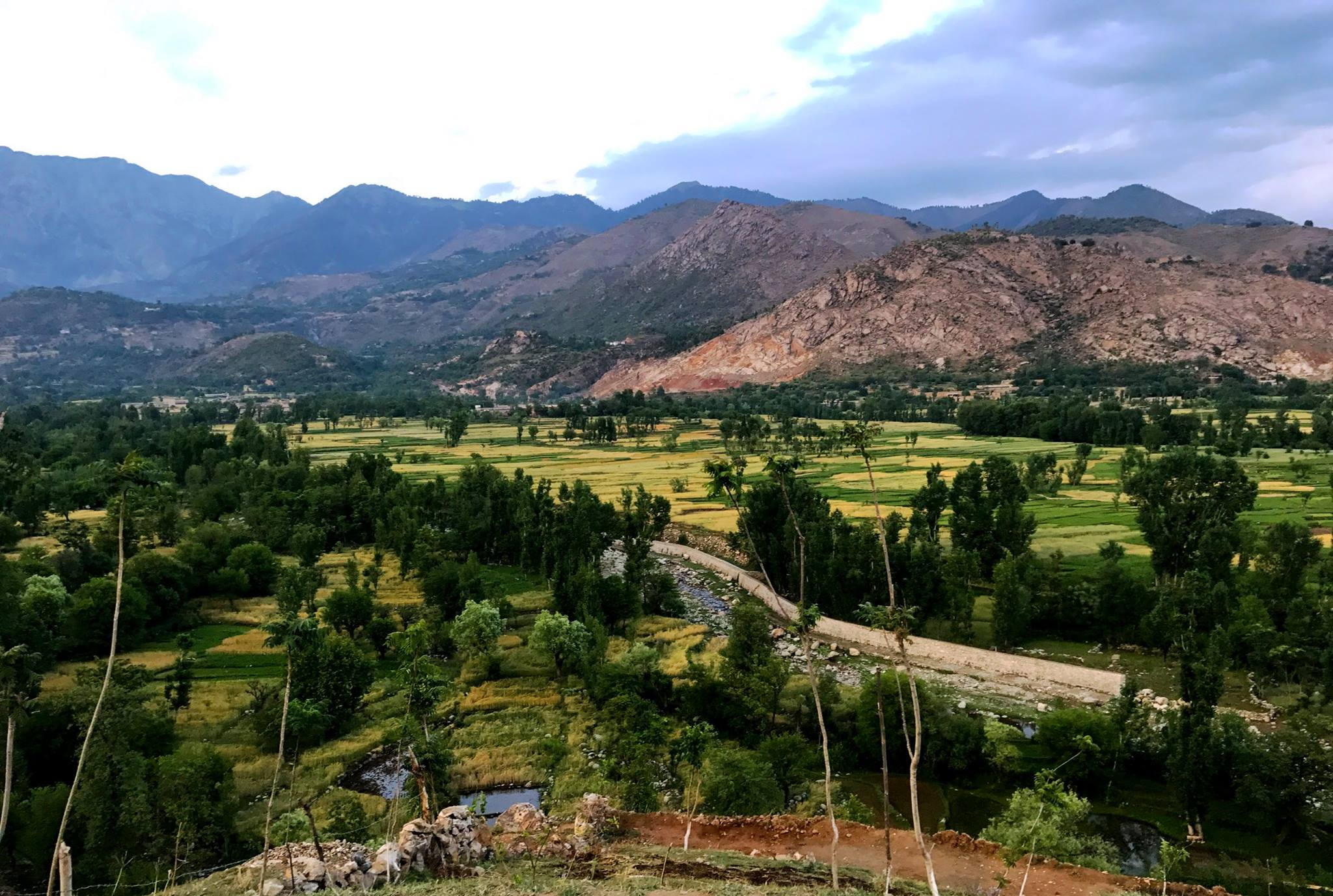
Mountain valley

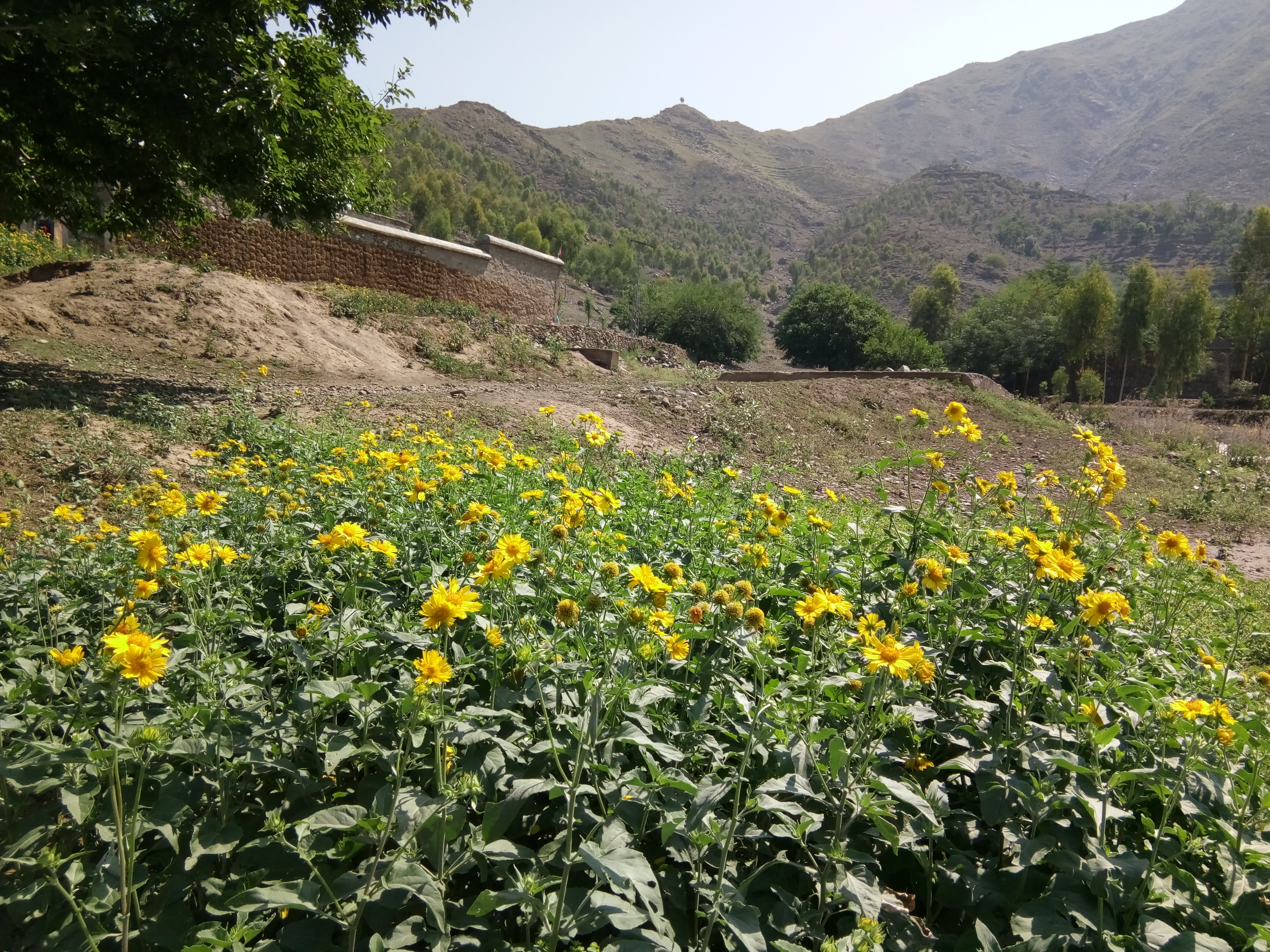
Wildflowers on mountainside

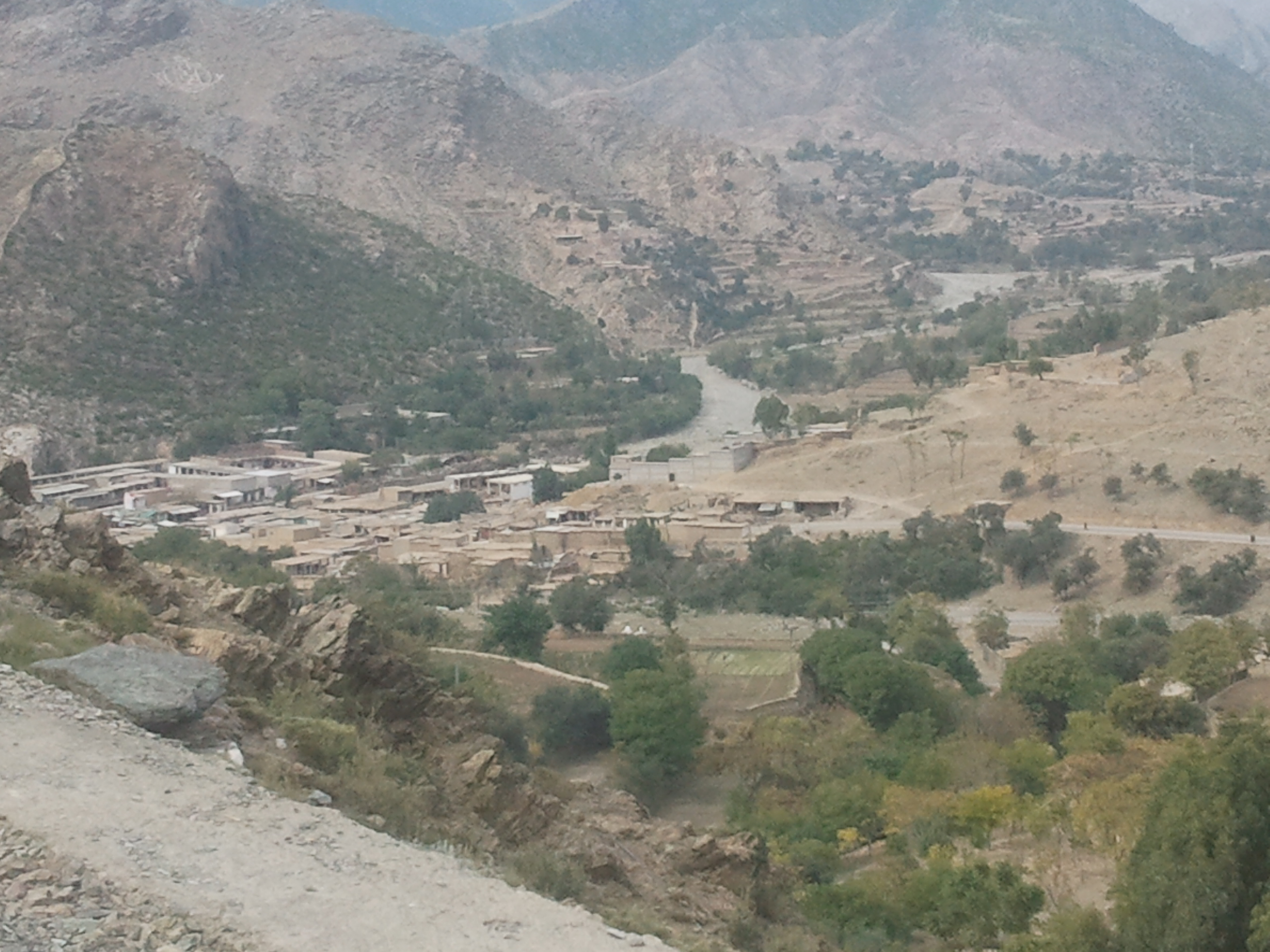
Valley settlement

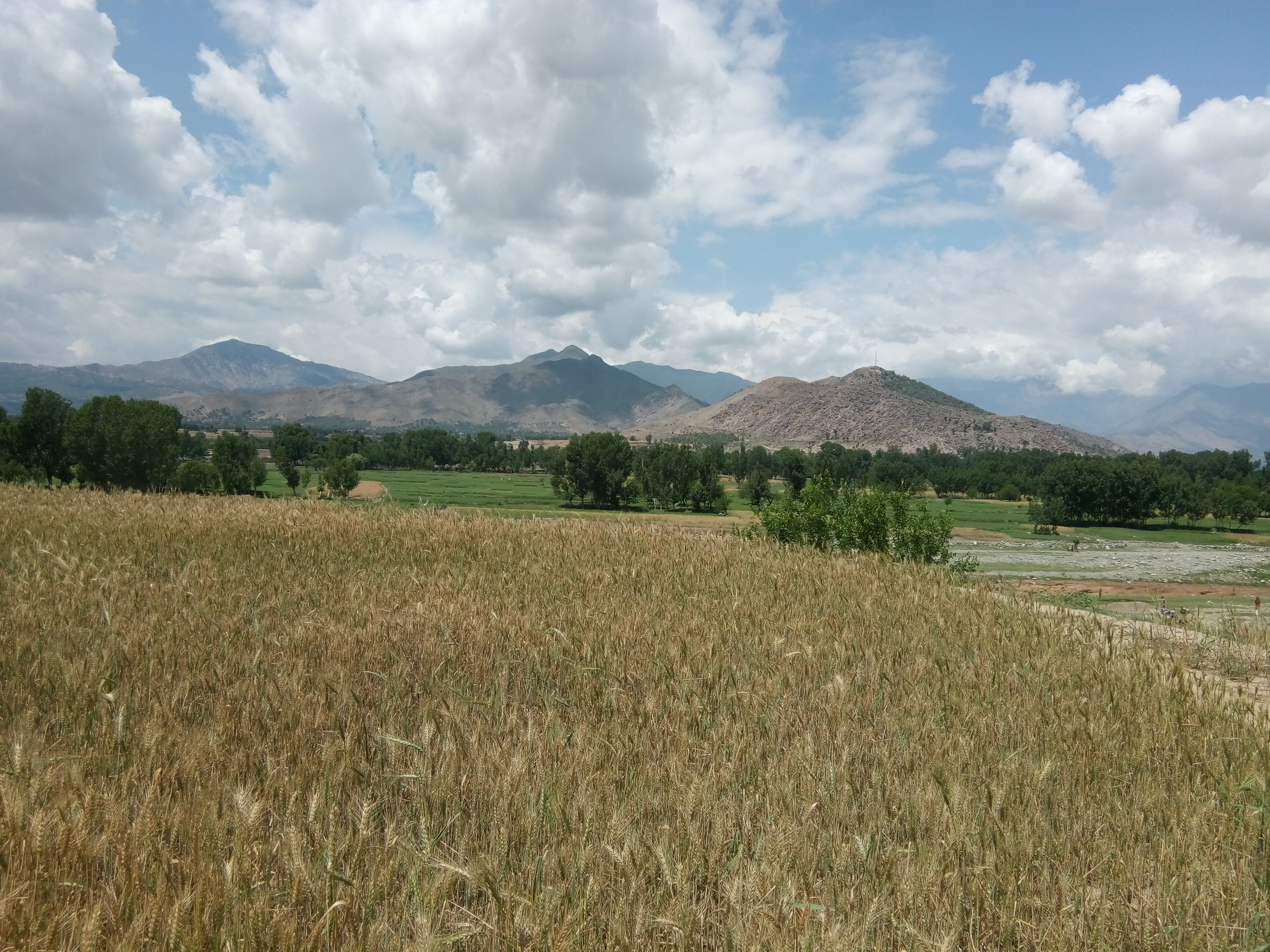
Wheat field

== See also ==
- Bajaur Campaign
- 1961 Pakistani Bombing of Batmalai
- Damadola airstrike of January 13, 2006
- Chenagai airstrike of October 30, 2006
- Bajaur offensive
- Kakazai
- Salarzai
