= Constituency WR-12 =

Reserved seat in a Pakistani provincial assembly

- Constituency for the Khyber Pakhtunkhwa Assembly

Current constituency
- Member: Uzma Khan

Constituency WR-12 is a reserved seat for women in the Khyber Pakhtunkhwa Assembly.

== See also ==
- Constituency PK-91 (Upper Dir-I)
- Constituency PK-92 (Upper Dir-II)
- Constituency PK-93 (Upper Dir-III)
