= Chukiatan, Dir Upper =

Town in Khyber Pakhtunkhwa, Pakistan

Coordinates: 35°09′N 71°54′E

Chukiatan, or Chukyatan, in Urdu چُکیاتن pashto چکياتڼis a small town 9 km from Dir, in Khyber Pakhtunkhwa in Pakistan. It is the main route for Barawal Bandi, and Kohistan (Kumrat). The rivers Dir (a tributary of the Panjkora River), Panjkora and Barawal meet each other there. Chukiatan has several picnic and fishing spots on the riverbanks, with people from all over Lower and Upper Dir coming for the fishing. Chukiatan is also known for its greenery and its people's hospitality.

Many of the people from Chukiatan work in foreign countries, mostly in the Middle East. Other occupations are farming and various small businesses. One of the biggest Frontier Crop DIR reside in Chukiatan.
