= Usheri Pass =

Valley in Pakistan

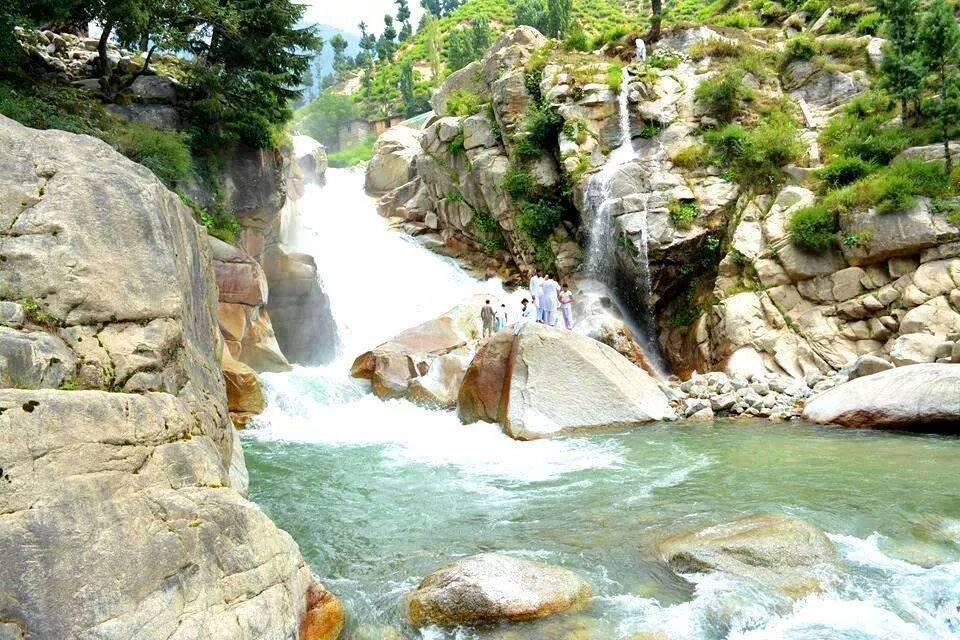
Lamchar waterfall, Ushirai Dara

Ushirai Pass or Usheri Dara (also spelled as Usherai) is a mountain pass in Upper Dir District, Khyber Pakhtunkhwa, Pakistan. It is located at a distance of 25 km from the main town of Darora and comes under the administration of Upper Dir.

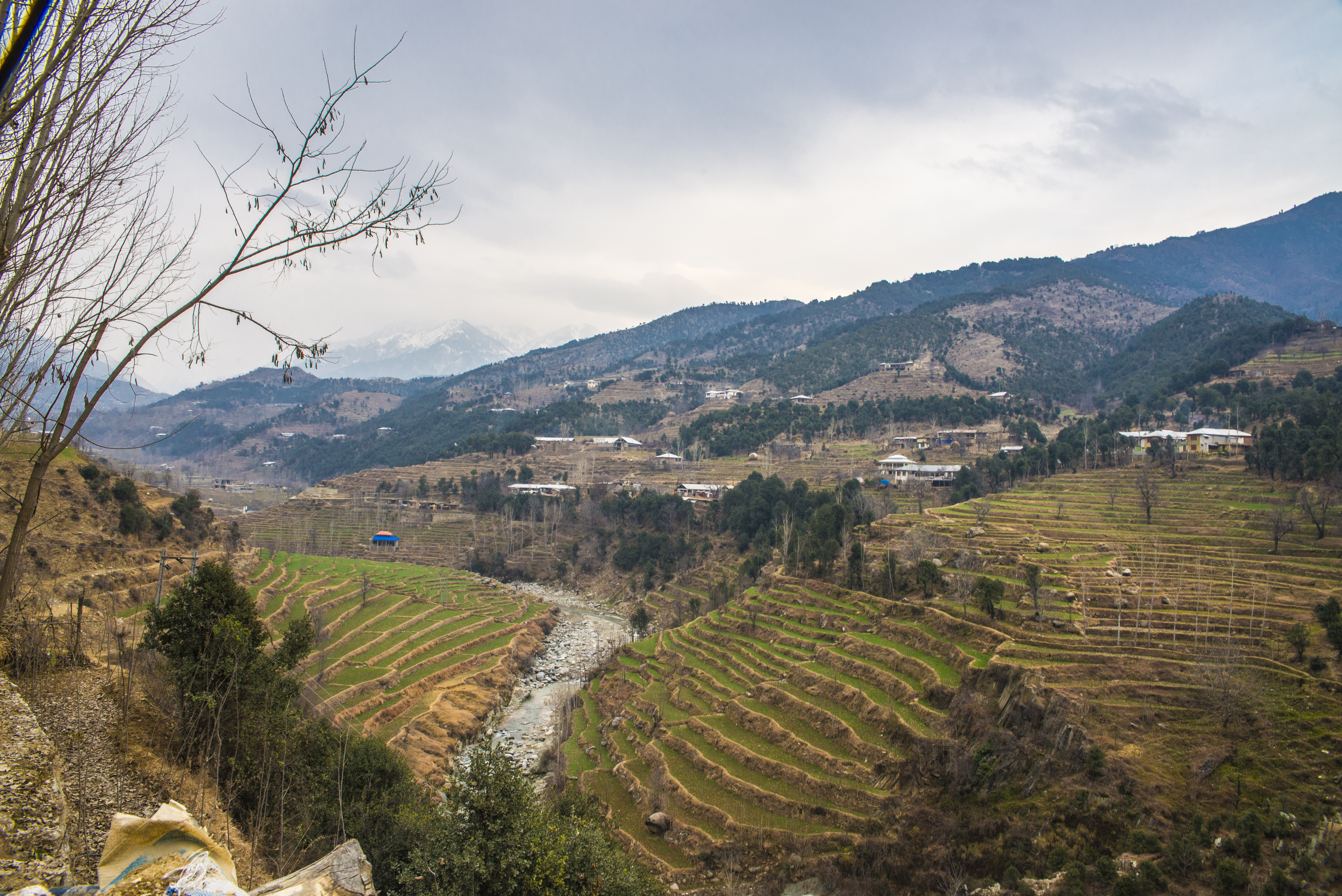

== See also ==
- Kumrat Valley
- Laram Top
