= Dir District =

Dir District may refer to:

- Dir (region) - a region in the Khyber Pakhtunkhwa province of Pakistan that was known as Dir District until its bifurcation in 1996

- Lower Dir District - a district in the Khyber Pakhtunkhwa province of Pakistan, once part of the unified district of Dir
- Upper Dir District - a district in the Khyber Pakhtunkhwa province of Pakistan, once part of the unified district of Dir
