= Nowra, Khyber Pakhtunkhwa =

Nowra is a village located in the Barawal Tehsil of Upper Dir District in the Khyber Pakhtunkhwa province of Pakistan. It is part of the Sundrawal Union Council
