= Qashqaray =

Village in the Upper Dir District, Pakistan

Coordinates: 35°14′52″N 71°51′42.1″E

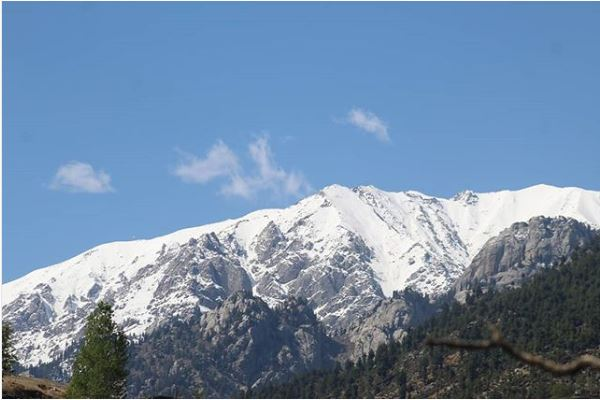

Qashqaray is a village in the Upper Dir District in the Malakand Division of the Khyber Pakhtunkhwa province of Pakistan. Its district headquarters is Dir. It is one of the scenic villages of Upper Dir and an attractive spot for tourists.

Qashqaray is divided into two sections: Upper Qashqaray, and Lower Qashqaray. It is 7 km away from Dir Town while 11 km from Lowari Tunnel. It is covered with green grasslands, foggy hills, snow clad mountains during winter. The Panjkora River and Cedrus deodara forests are attractions of the village.
