= Muhammad Yamin (Pakistani politician) =

Pakistani politician

Member of the Provincial Assembly of Khyber Pakhtunkhwa
- Incumbent
- Assumed office 29 February 2024
- Constituency: PK-12 Upper Dir-II

Personal details
- Born: Upper Dir District, Pakistan
- Party: PTI (2024-present)

Muhammad Yamin is a Pakistani politician from Upper Dir District. He has been serving as a member of the Provincial Assembly of Khyber Pakhtunkhwa since February 2024.

== Career ==
He contested the 2024 general elections as a Pakistan Tehreek-e-Insaf/Independent candidate from PK-12 Upper Dir-II. He secured 23915 votes. His runner-up was Azam Khan of Jamaat-e-Islami (Pakistan) who secured 12531 votes.
