= Zia-ul-Haq (disambiguation) =

Muhammad Zia-ul-Haq (1924–1988) was the sixth president of Pakistan from 1978 to 1988.

Zia-ul-Haq may also refer to:

- Zia-ul-Haq (Afghan cricketer) or Zia-ul-Haq Parwani, Afghan cricketer
- Zia-ul-haq (Afghan cricketer, born 1999) or Zia-ul-Haq Esakhel (born 1999), Afghan cricketer
- Zia-ul-Haq (Pakistani cricketer) (born 1994), Pakistani cricketer
- Zia Ul Haq (vice-chancellor), at Pakistan's Khyber Medical University
