= Sundalm =

- Union Council
- Country: Pakistan
- Province: Khyber Pakhtunkhwa
- District: Upper Dir
- Time zone: UTC+5 (PST)

Sundalm is an administrative unit, known as Union Council, of Upper Dir District in the Khyber Pakhtunkhwa province of Pakistan.

Upper Dir is administratively subdivided into six tehsils which contain a total of 28 Union Councils. Upper Dir is represented in the National Assembly, and Provincial Assembly by one elected MNA and three elected MPAs respectively.

== See also ==
- Upper Dir District
