= Gandigar =

Village in Pakistan

Gandigar is a village in Upper Dir District, Khyber Pakhtunkhwa, Pakistan on Dir Chitral road. Its population is about 1 lakh (100,000). The village is surrounded by green hills and the Panjkora River flows through it.
