= Gul Ibrahim Khan =

Pakistani politician

Member of the Provincial Assembly of Khyber Pakhtunkhwa
- Incumbent
- Assumed office 29 February 2024
- Constituency: PK-11 Upper Dir-I

Personal details
- Born: Upper Dir District, Pakistan
- Political party: PTI (2024-present)

Gul Ibrahim Khan is a Pakistani politician from Upper Dir District. He is currently serving as member of the Provincial Assembly of Khyber Pakhtunkhwa since February 2024.

== Career ==
He contested the 2024 general elections as a Pakistan Tehreek-e-Insaf/Independent candidate from PK-11 Upper Dir-I. He secured 9327 votes. His runner-up was Malik Badshah Saleh of PPP who secured 1579 votes.
