= Barawal (union council) =

- Union Council
- Country: Pakistan
- Province: Khyber Pakhtunkhwa
- District: Upper Dir
- Time zone: UTC+5 (PST)

Barawal is an administrative unit known as "Union Council" of the Upper Dir District in the Khyber Pakhtunkhwa province of Pakistan.

Upper Dir is administratively subdivided into six tehsils which contain a total of 28 Union Councils. Upper Dir is represented in the National Assembly and Provincial Assembly by one elected MNA and three elected MPAs respectively. It borders Lower Dir District in the east, and Chitral District and Afghanistan's Kunar Province to the north and west. Barawal's area varies in general from 1400 meters to 2100 meters from sea level, with peaks rising to up to 4500 meters.
