= Muhammad Anwar Khan (Upper Dir politician) =

Pakistani politician

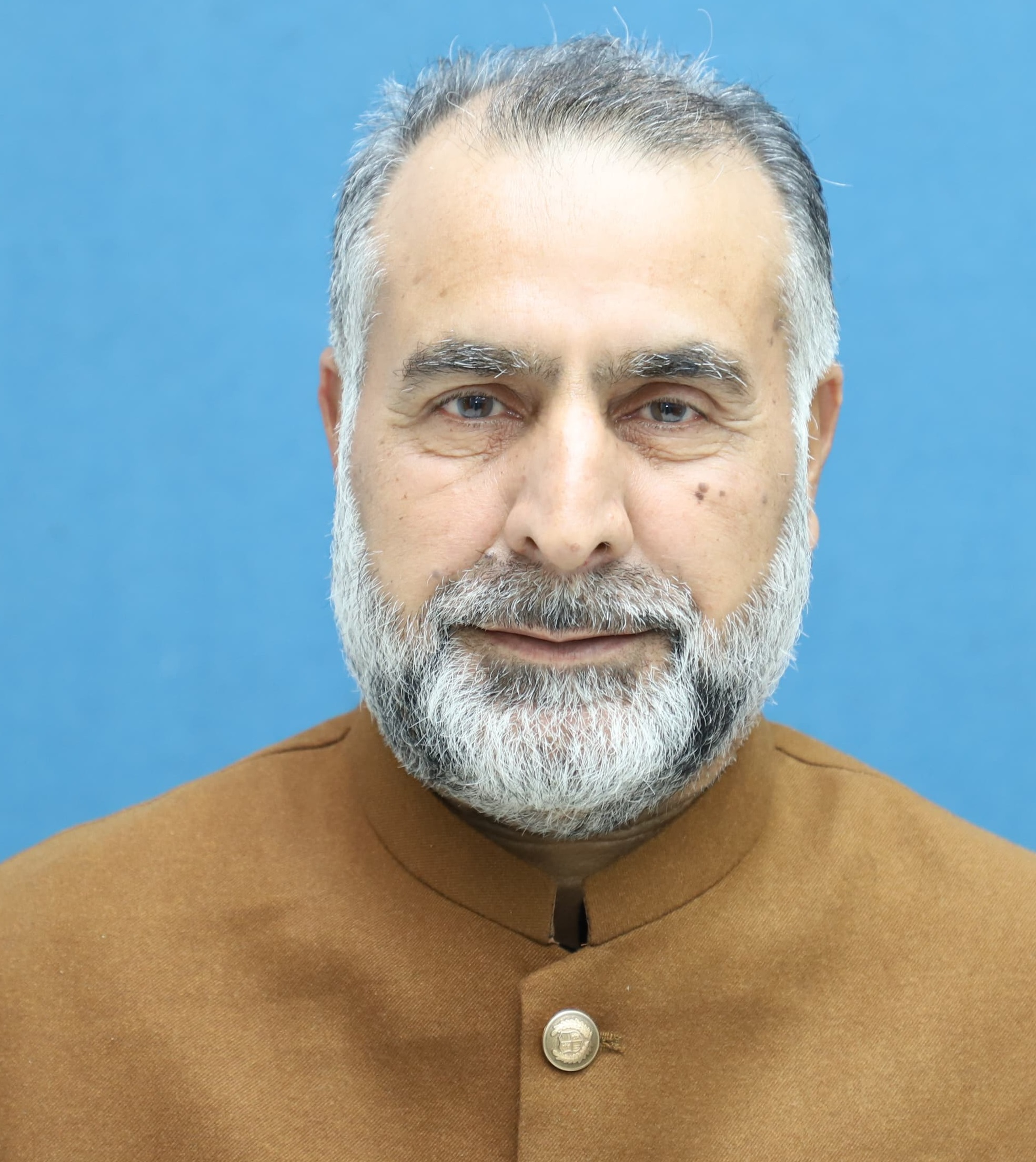

Member of the Provincial Assembly of Khyber Pakhtunkhwa
- Incumbent
- Assumed office 29 February 2024
- President: District President Pakistan Tehreek-e-Insaf Upper Dir
- Constituency: PK-13 Upper Dir-III

Personal details
- Born: Upper Dir District, Khyber Pakhtunkhwa, Pakistan
- Party: PTI (2021-present)
- Other political affiliations: PPP (2002-2008)
- Children: Danyal Anwar and Zaid Anwar

Muhammad Anwar Khan (Urdu: محمد انور خان) is a Pakistani politician from Upper Dir District. He is currently serving as a member of the Provincial Assembly of Khyber Pakhtunkhwa (Member of the Provincial Assembly) since February 2024 for the second time. Initially he was elected as Member of the Provincial Assembly In 2008. He is Also serving as District President PTI Upper Dir.

== Electoral history ==
In the 2002 General Elections, he contested for a National Assembly seat under the PPP banner.

In the 2008 bye Elections, Anwar Khan secured a seat in the Khyber Pakhtunkhwa Assembly (PK-91) as a member of the Pakistan Peoples Party Parliamentarians (PPPP).

Later, Anwar Khan joined the Pakistan Tehreek-e-Insaf (PTI) and became the District President of PTI in Upper Dir in 2021.

In the 2024 general elections, Muhammad Anwar Khan ran as an independent candidate associated with the Pakistan Tehreek-e-Insaf (PTI) party in PK-13 (Upper Dir-III). He gained 32,043 votes, securing his victory.

== Roles ==
He serves as the Chairman of the Standing Committee No. 08 on Higher Education, Archives, and Libraries Department. Additionally, he is a member of the Public Accounts Committee, Standing Committee No. 02 on Law Reforms and Control on Subordinate Legislation, and the Standing Committee No. 29 on Housing Department

== Career ==
He contested the 2024 general elections as a Pakistan Tehreek-e-Insaf/Independent candidate from PK-13 Upper Dir-III. He secured 32,043 votes. His runner-up was Inayatullah Khan of Jamaat-e-Islami who secured 22,457 votes.

== Early political involvement ==
Anwar Khan’s political journey began in 1982 when he joined the People Students Federation (PSF). As a PSF member, he played an active role in student politics and served as the PSF President at Islamia College Peshawar during 1984-85. He became the founder and president of the Dir Student Union. In 1988-89, he was elected as the General Secretary of PSF at Peshawar University

== Education ==
Anwar Khan holds a Bachelor of Arts (B.A.) degree in Law (L.L.B).
