= Panjkora Valley =

Panjkora Valley is a river valley located along the course of Panjkora River in the Khyber Pakhtunkhwa province of Pakistan.

== Geography ==
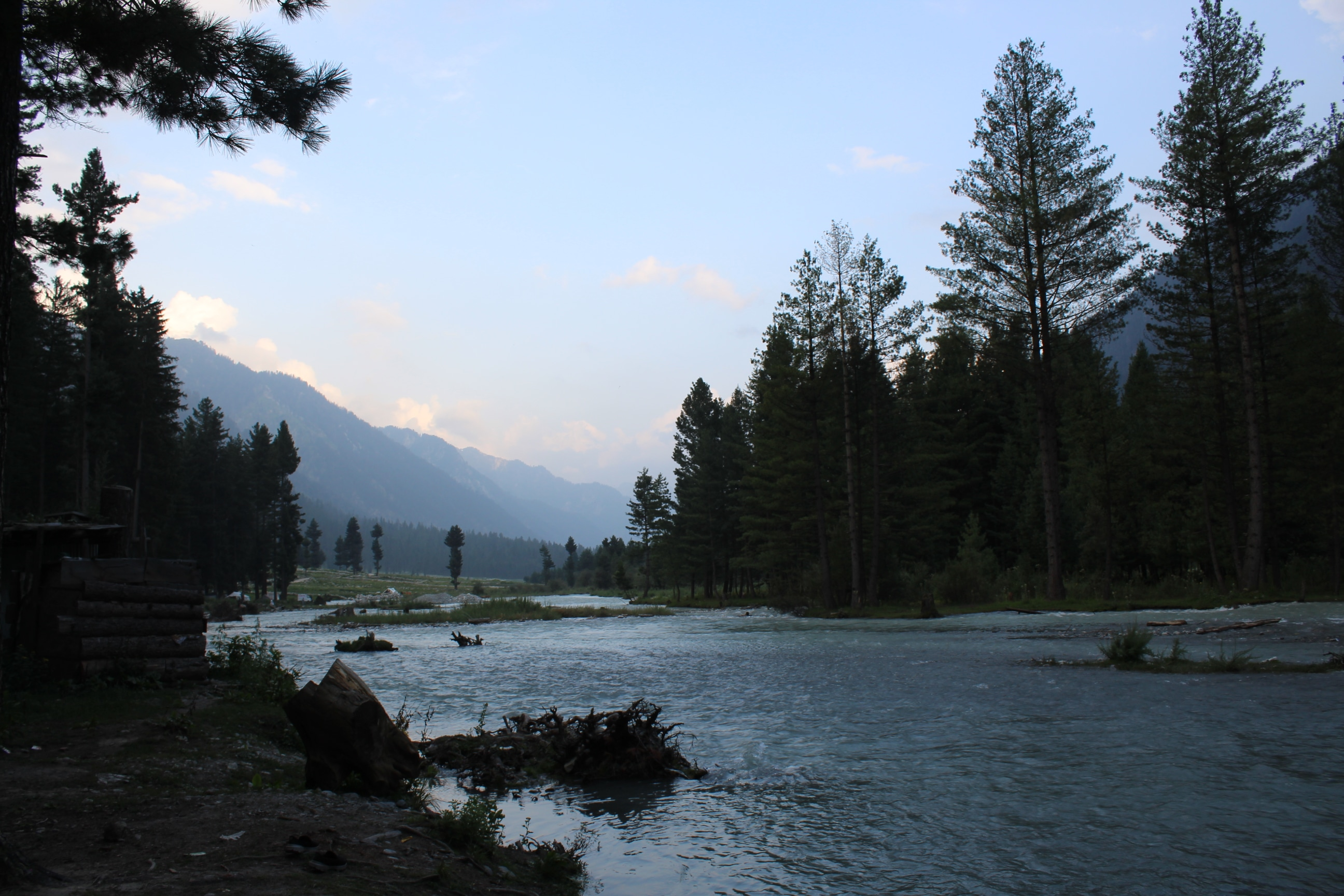
Panjkora River flowing through the valley

Panjkora River originates near the Shandur Pass and is joined by several streams. The Panjkora Valley runs along the course of Panjkora River until its confluence with the Swat River below the village of Kalangai. The section of Upper Panjkora Valley until confluence of Panjkora with Dir River near Dir is also known as Panjkora Kohistan or Dir Kohistan, while below Dir it is known as Dir Valley. The point across a narrow gorge where the Panjkora River flows near Sheringal is considered to separate Dir Proper from Dir Kohistan.

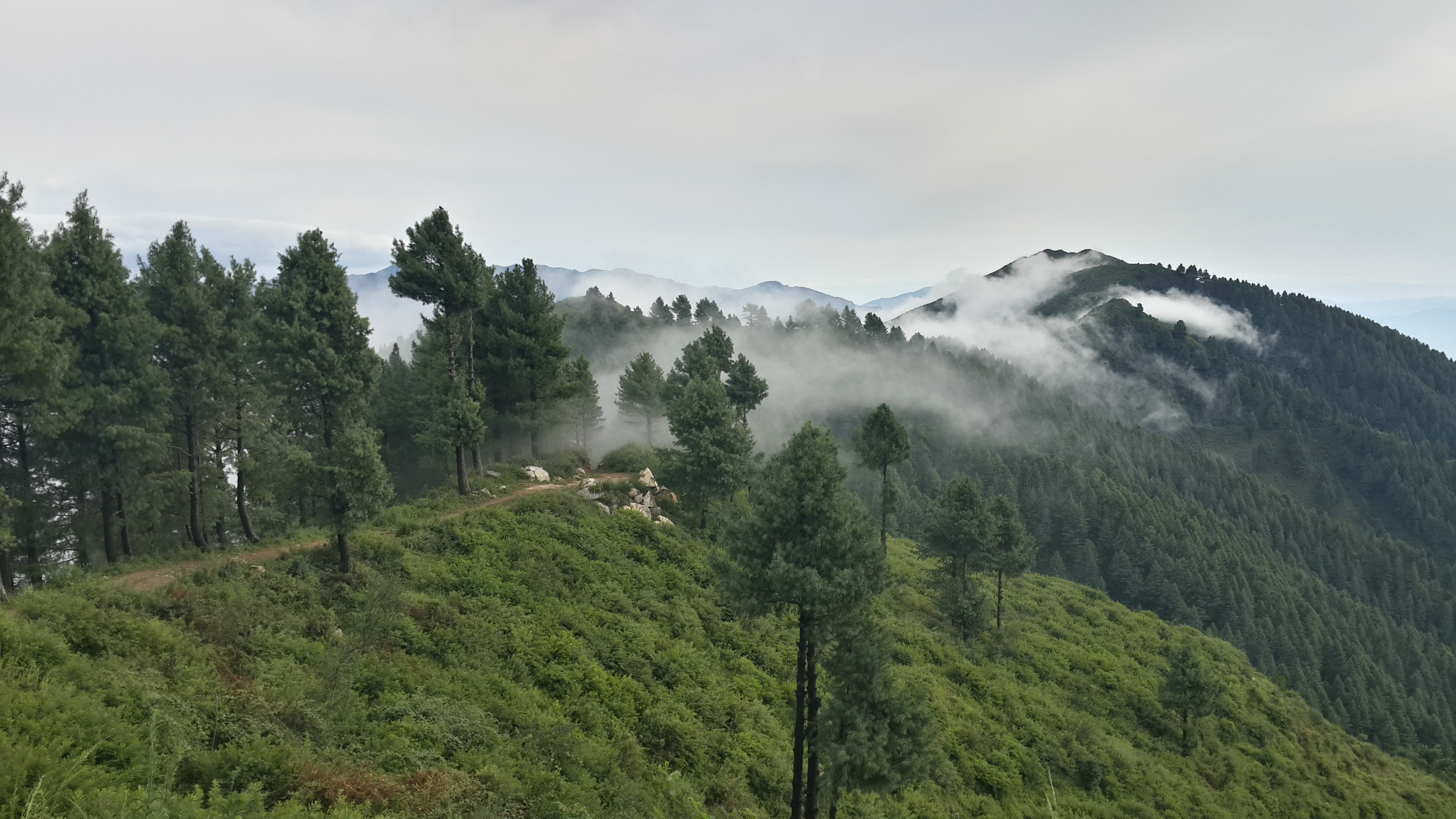
Lajbouk village

Upper Panjkora Valley, or simply the Panjkora Valley, is highly mountainous, with highest peak being over 6,000 m (20,000 ft), while southwards the elevation decreases to 500 m (1,600 ft). Kumrat Valley forms most of Upper Panjkora Valley. Lowari Pass connects it to the Chitral Valley while Badgoi Pass connects it to the Swat Valley. Politically it is divided into the districts of Upper Dir, Lower Dir and Bajaur.

== History ==
=== Ancient ===
Excavations have revealed evidence of burials associated with early human habitation at Timargarha and other places, dating from 18th to 6th century BCE. One of the early tribes of Panjkora Valley were Gauraioi, identified by scholars as ancestors of Gawri people of today, who fought against the Alexander the Great during his Cophen campaign in 327 BCE. After the Greeks, the area became a centre of the Gandharan Civilization, known for its Buddhist culture and art. This period is signified by the presence of the monumental remains of the Buddhist stupas and monasteries, relics of which are present at the Chakdara Museum.

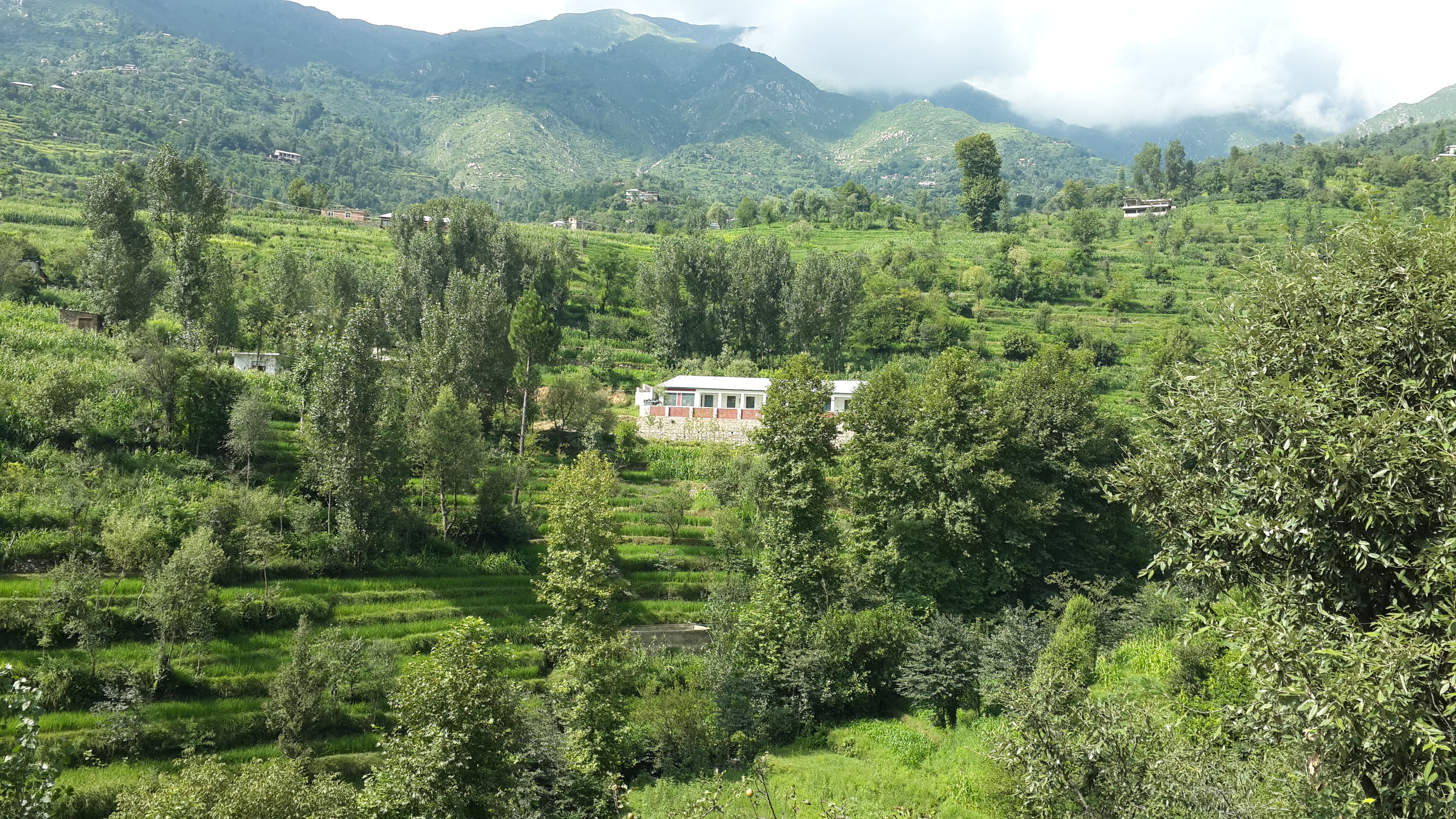
A view of Lajbouk village

=== Early modern ===
Islam arrived in the Panjkora Valley after the invasion of Mahmud of Ghazni in the early 11th century CE. The Gawri people were defeated and forced to migrate further north by the Yousafzai Pashtuns, who established themselves in lower Panjkora Valley in the early 16th century. Akhund lIyas, a religious scholar from the Painda Khel clan of the Malizai tribe enjoyed popular support among locals and was recognized as a spiritual leader. His descendants built upon this support, ultimately increased their power over the people and laid the foundation of Dir state. The British annexed Dir in 1897 and demarcated the boundaries of the state which came to encompass whole of Panjkora Valley.

=== Modern ===
After the independence of Pakistan in 1947 from Britain, Dir still enjoyed the status of a separate state, but was later amalgamated with Pakistan in 1960 as a tribal agency. This tribal agency was finally merged into the North-West Frontier Province in 1969 whereabout it became the district of Dir. In 1996 the decision was made to divide Dir District into two districts, Lower Dir and Upper Dir, with Timargarha and Dir as their respective headquarters, but due to lack of funds, until 2000 they continued to be administered by a single district commissioner operating out of Timergara.

== Demographics ==
The Upper Panjkora Valley (Panjkora Kohistan, also known as Dir Kohistan) is inhabited by the Gawri people while in the rest of valley (known as Dir Valley) Yousafzai Pashtuns, mainly Malizai tribe, have a majority; Gawri is spoken in mountainous north while Pashto dominates lower valley, as well as is used as language of communication in the wider area. Speakers of Gujari also live in Panjkora Valley.
