= Banda Nihag =

Bandai Nihag
- Union Council
- Country: Pakistan
- Province: Khyber Pakhtunkhwa
- District: Upper Dir
- Time zone: UTC+5 (PST)

Banda Nihag is an administrative unit known as "Union Council" of Upper Dir District in the Khyber Pakhtunkhwa province of Pakistan. [[Sheikh Hassan Allahyari]]

Upper Dir is administratively subdivided into six tehsils which contain a total of 28 Union Councils. Upper Dir is represented in the National Assembly and Provincial Assembly by one elected MNA and three elected MPAs respectively.

== See also ==
- Upper Dir District
