= Inayatullah Khan (Pakistani politician) =

Pakistani politician

Member of the Provincial Assembly of Khyber Pakhtunkhwa
- In office 13 August 2018 – 18 January 2023
- Succeeded by: Muhammad Anwar Khan
- Constituency: PK-12 (Upper Dir-III)
- In office 17 June 2013 – 2 May 2018
- Constituency: PK-91 Upper Dir-I

Personal details
- Born: Upper Dir District, Khyber Pakhtunkhwa, Pakistan
- Party: JIP (2025-present)
- Other political affiliations: JIP (2013-2025)
- Occupation: Politician

Inayatullah Khan (Urdu: عنایت اللہ خان) is a Pakistani politician hailing from Upper Dir District and belongs to Jamaat-e-Islami Pakistan. He served as a member of the Provincial Assembly of KPK for three terms, from January 2002 to October 2007 and from May 2013 to January 2023.

Inayatullah khan cleared the competitive exam of Pakistan (CSS) in the year 2002 but he didn't join civil services because he contested election in 2002 and was elected as MPA and later Health Minister of Khyber Pakhtunkhwa, the erstwhile NWFP. Inayatullah Khan played a vital role in his tenure developing the health facilities in the province. He inaugurated various hospitals in Swat, Mardan, Peshawar and other places of the province.

He was also Minister of Local Government, Elections & Rural Development in the Khyber Pakhtunkhwa Assembly. He was also serving as committee chairman of Special Committee on the issue of Business activities in the University Town Peshawar, Select Committee on Local Government, member of the committee The Khyber Pakhtunkhwa Police Bill, 2017 and Committee on The Khyber Pakhtunkhwa Whistleblower Protection and Vigilance commission Bill.
