= Sharingal Tehsil =

Coordinates: 35°17′N 72°00′E

- Tehsil
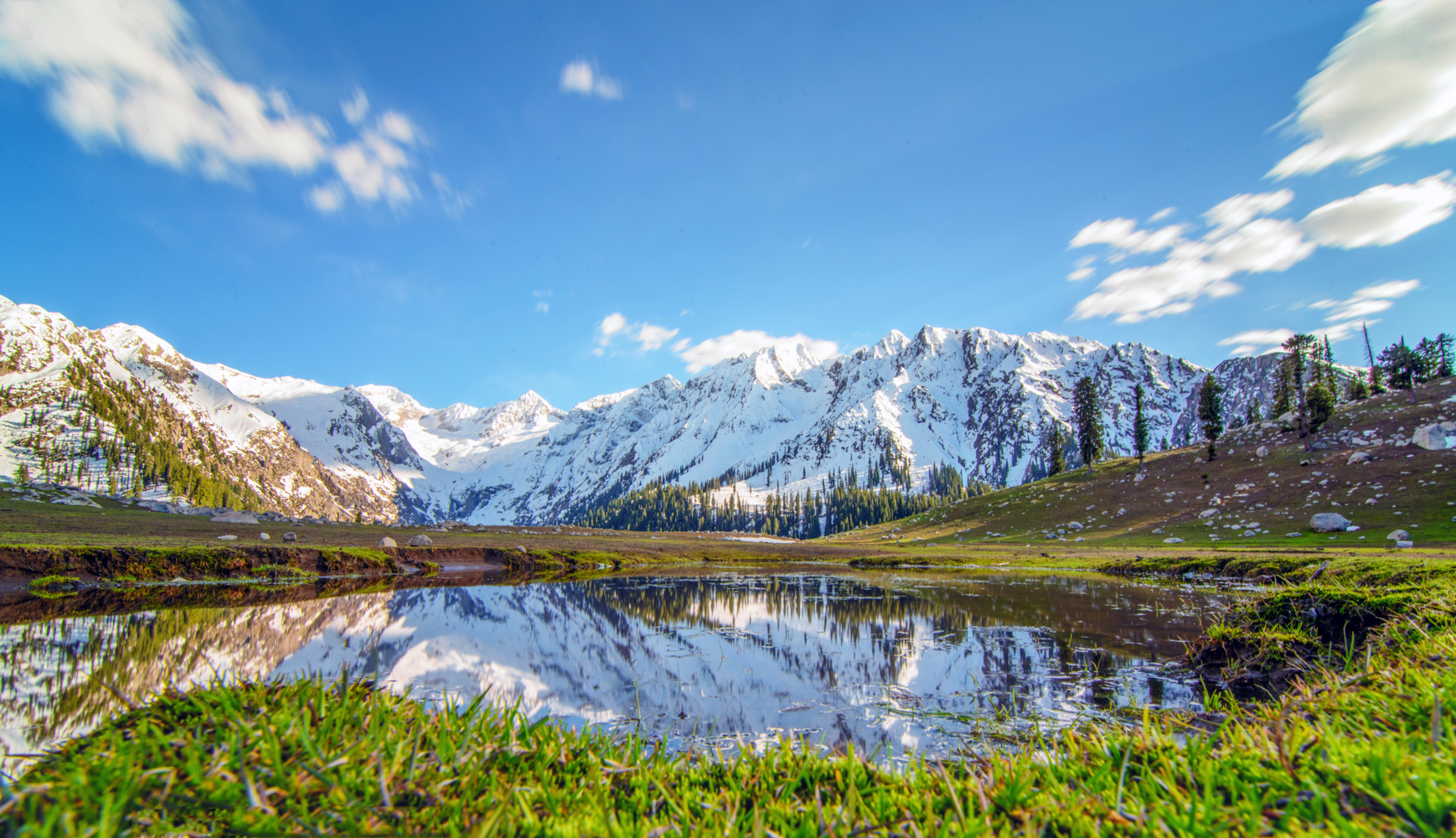
- Jahaz Banda meadows in Kumrat Valley
- Interactive map of Sharingal Tehsil
- Country: Pakistan
- Region: Khyber Pakhtunkhwa
- District: Upper Dir

Government
  - Chairman: Shah Wali Khan (PPP)

Area
  - Total: 1,140 km^{2} (440 sq mi)

Population (2023)
  - Total: 210,356
- Time zone: UTC+5 (PST)
  - Summer (DST): UTC+6 (PDT)

Sharingal Tehsil is a tehsil located in Upper Dir District, Khyber Pakhtunkhwa, Pakistan.

== Demographics ==
The population of Sharingal tehsil is 210,356 according to the 2023 census.

=== Ethnic tribes ===
The main ethnic tribes in Shangrila are:

- Gawri
- Gujjar

== See also ==
- List of tehsils of Khyber Pakhtunkhwa
