= Kumrat Valley =

Kumrat Valley کُمراٹ
- Valley
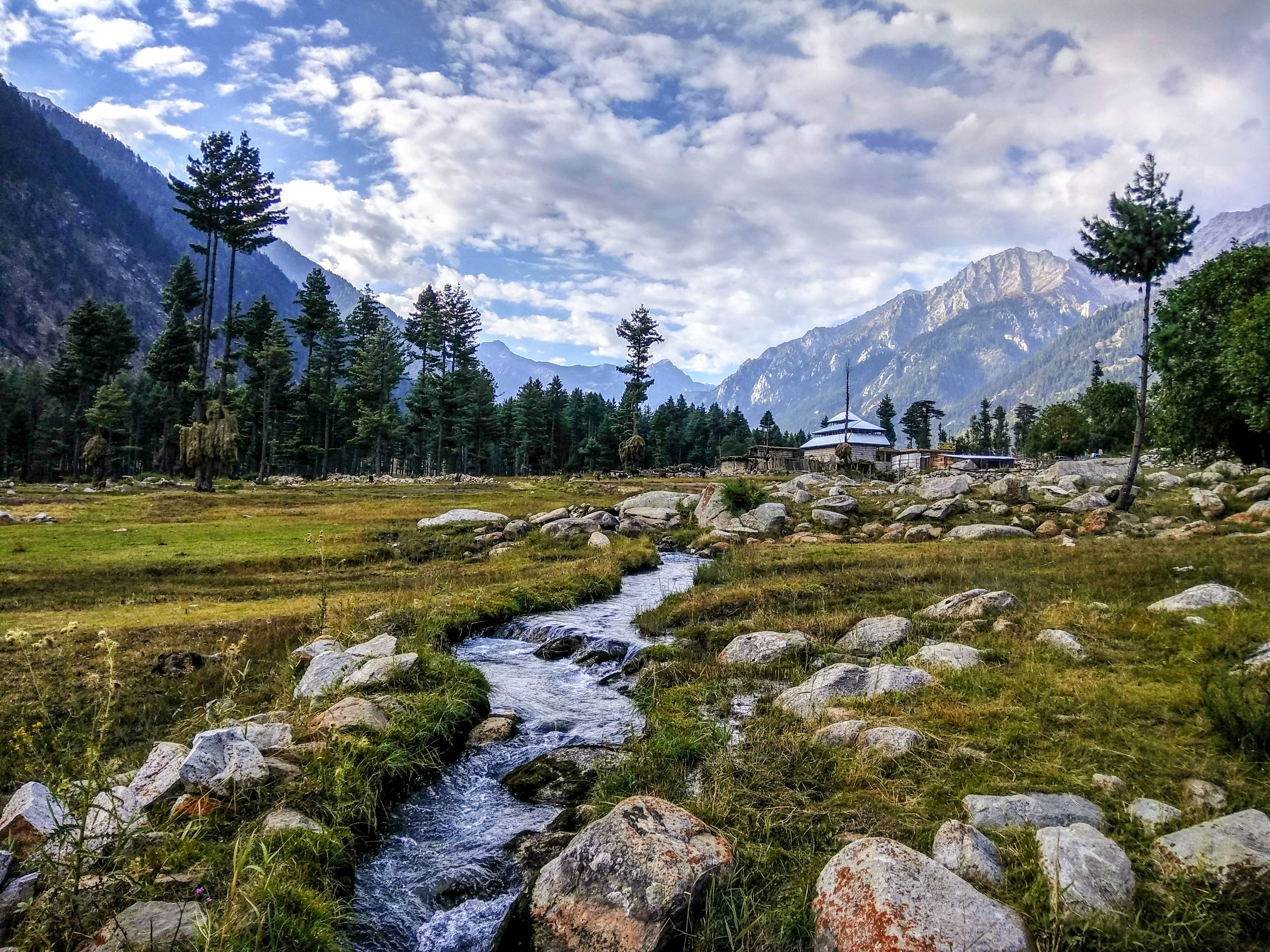
- Evening view at Kumrat Valley

- Location in Khyber Pakhtunkhwa, Pakistan Kumrat Valley کُمراٹ (Pakistan)
- Coordinates: 35°32′N 72°13′E
- Country: Pakistan
- Province: Khyber Pakhtunkhwa
- District: Upper Dir District
- Tehsil: Sharingal Tehsil
- Time zone: UTC+5 (PST)

Kumrat (Gawri and Urdu: کُمراٹ) is the upper section of the alpine Panjkora Valley in the Upper Dir District, in Khyber Pakhtunkhwa, Pakistan. The valley is mainly populated by the Gawri people.

Kumrat Valley covers an area of 346 km^{2} (134 sq mi). It is among the most popular tourist spots in the Malakand Division. Every summer season, thousands of tourists from different areas of Pakistan and abroad visit Kumrat Valley for its greenery and cool weather. Around Eid al-Fitr holidays, around 2,000 vehicles enter the region on a daily basis. It can only be accessed via four-wheel vehicles, as the road leading to it is unmetalled.

== Geography ==
Kumrat Valley is located on the banks of the Panjkora River. It is covered with green pastures and snow-clad mountains. These forests serve as habitats for a variety of flora and fauna. It is located in the Upper Dir Kohistan region at the back side of which Swat Kohistan area of Gabral is located. Another feature of Kumrat Valley is its towering Deodar forest trees located on level ground adjacent the Panjkora River. At several places, the Panjkora River divides into channels, on the banks of which a few makeshift camping spots offer accommodation to tourists. There are several waterfalls there as well. Kala Chashma (Black Spring) is also located there.

== Flora and fauna ==
Kumrat Valley has a significant biodiversity. Pine forests are present in the upper section, while Oak forests are found in the lower valley. The main plant species include blue pine (Pinus wallichiana), Indian horse-chestnut (Aesculus indica), deodar (Cedrus deodar), West-Himalayan fir (Abies pindrow), holly oak (Quercus baloot), Himalayan birch (Betula utilis), common walnut (Juglans regia), Himalayan poplar (Poplus ciliate). The main mammalian species of the valley include the Asiatic black bear (Ursus thibetanus), gray wolf (Canis lupus), red fox (Vulpes vulpes), yellow-throated marten (Martes flavigula), Kashmir musk deer (Moschus cupreus), and Astor markhor (Capra falconeri).

Deodar forests are depleting in Kumrat Valley owing to their use as a source of fuel for heating and cooking purposes in the harsh winter season.

== Gallery ==
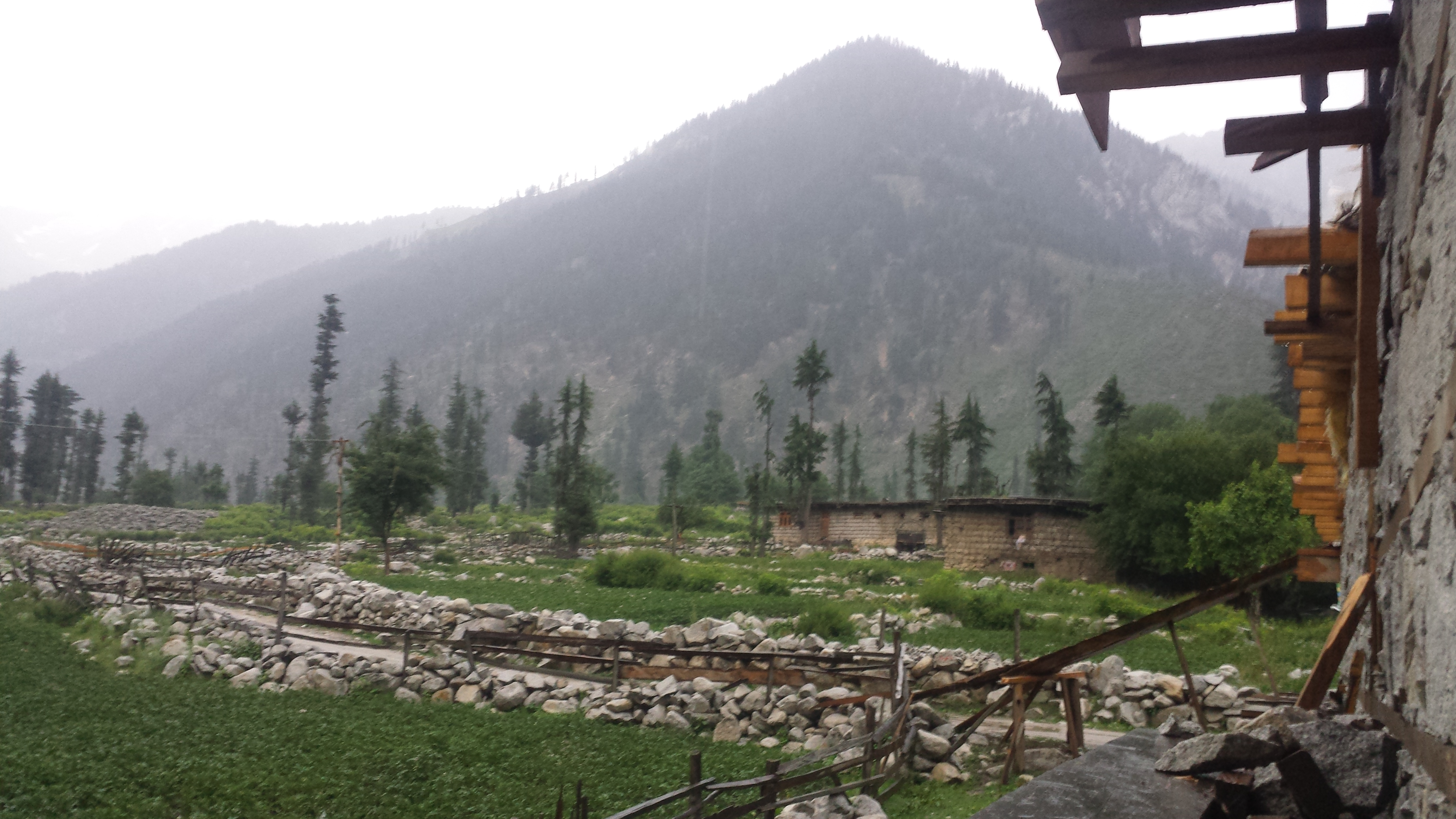

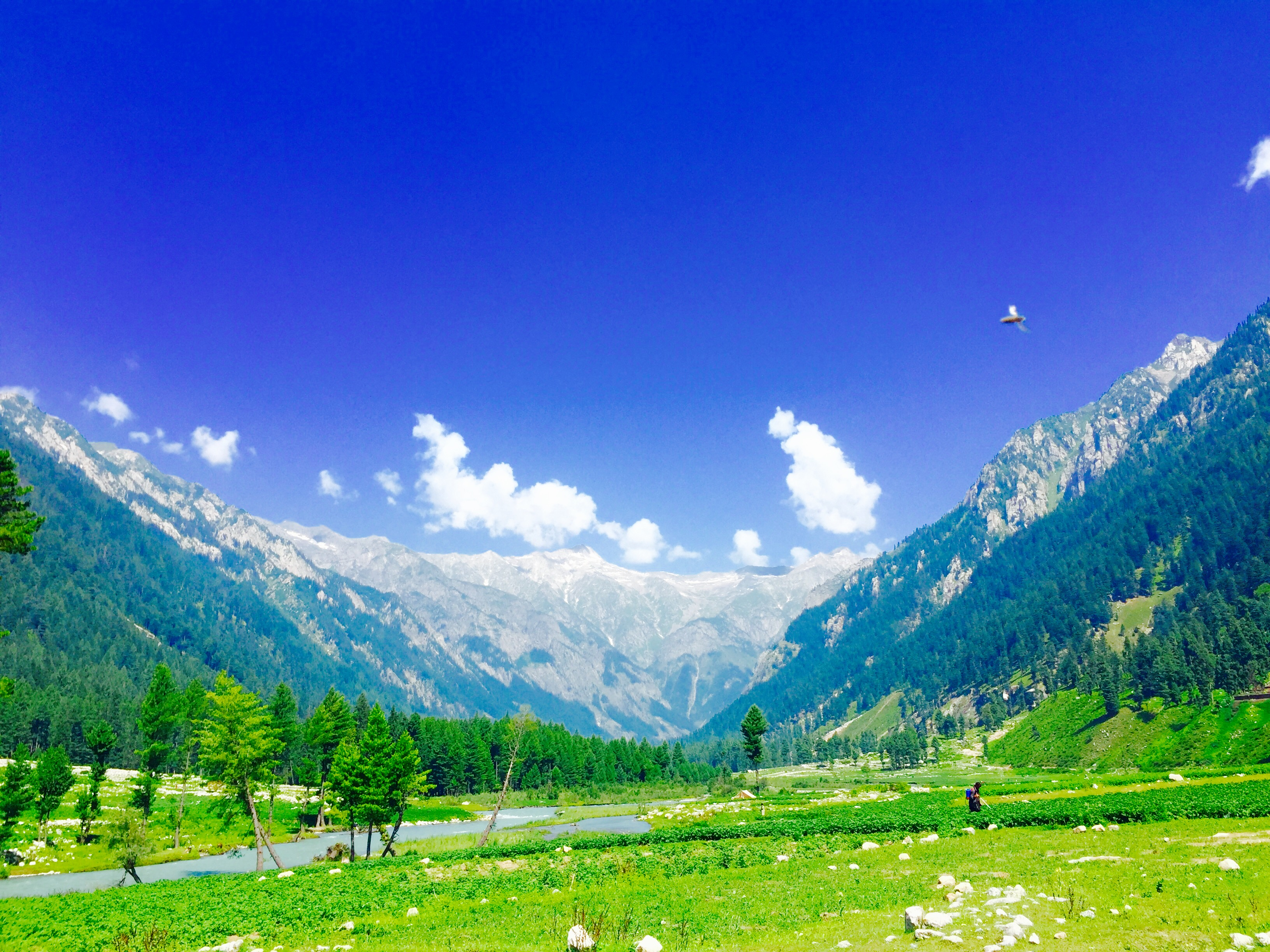

== See also ==
- Kaghan Valley
- Ushirai Dara
- Laram Top
- Jahaz Banda
