= Shalkani =

Pakistani village

Shalkani

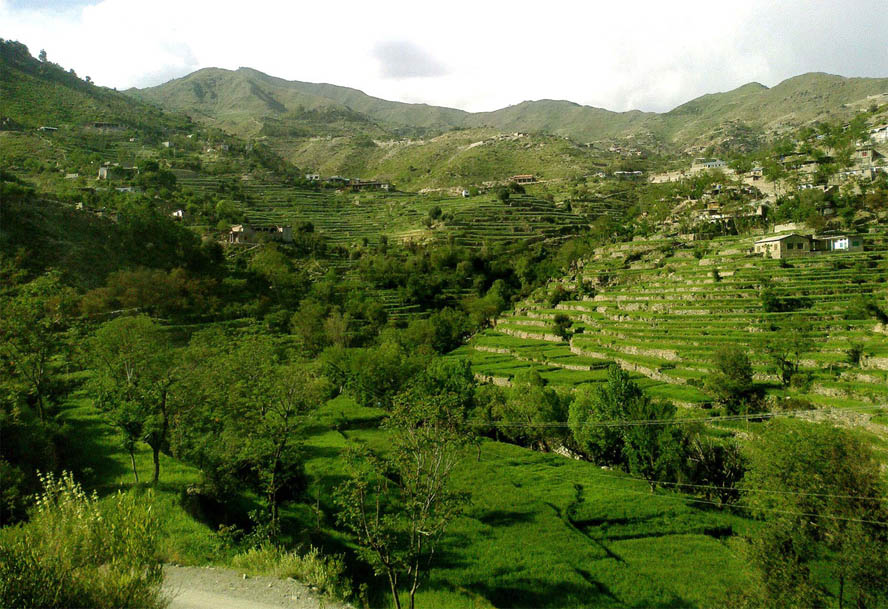
- Country: Pakistan
- Province: Pukhtunkhwa
- Union Council: Shalpalam
- Houses: 450
- Language: Pashto (100%)
- Religion: Islam (100%)

Area
  - Total: 6 km^{2} (2.3 sq mi)

Population (1998)
  - Total: 3,000
- Time zone: PST

The Shalkani (Urdu: شلکنی) is a village in northern Khyber Pakhtunkhwa, northwestern Pakistan. Shalkani is located approximately at 6 km distance from Peshawar to Dir GT Road.

== Location ==
Shalkani is located on the left side of Panjkoora River, about 26 kilometers from Timergara. To the north side of Shalkani Jelar Dara is located, to the south is Shalpalam, to the east is Akhagram and to the west is Luqman Banda, and Shalkani is located as a small valley in center of them.

== Education ==
Following is the list of schools in Shalkani.

School	Boys	Girls
High	1	0
Middle	1	0
Primary	2	1
Maktab	2	2

== See also ==
- Timergara
- Dir
- Peshawar
