= Uzma Khan (politician) =

Pakistani politician

Uzma Khan MPA

Member of the Provincial Assembly of Khyber Pakhtunkhwa
- Incumbent
- Assumed office 31 May 2013
- Constituency: WR-12
- In office 2008–2013

Personal details
- Born: Village Mayar Jandol, Samar Bagh Tehsil, Lower Dir
- Party: Jamiat Ulema-e Islam (F) (JUI-F)
- Occupation: Politician

Uzma Khan (Urdu: عظمیٰ خان) is a Pakistani politician hailing from the village of Mayar Jandol, Samar Bagh Tehsil, Lower Dir, belong to Jamiat Ulema-e Islam (F). She is currently serving as a member of the Khyber Pakhtunkhwa Assembly. She is also serving as the committee member of the Standing Committee No. 34 on Labour Department, Standing Committee No. 26 on Elementary and Secondary Education Department, and the Standing Committee No. 23 on Administration Department.

== Education and career ==
She got her degrees in Shahadatul Aalamia, BCS and MA. She also served as member of the Khyber Pakhtunkhwa Assembly from 2008 to 2013.
