= Doog Dara =

- Union Council
- Country: Pakistan
- Province: Khyber Pakhtunkhwa
- District: Upper Dir
- Time zone: UTC+5 (PST)

Doog Dara is a union council of the Upper Dir District in the Khyber Pakhtunkhwa province of Pakistan. Doog Dara is a remote area of Dir Upper. It is located in east of the Chitral District. There are 25 villages in the area.

Upper Dir is subdivided into six tehsils administratively which contain a total of 28 union councils. Upper Dir is represented in the National Assembly and the Provincial Assembly by one elected MNA and three elected MPAs respectively.

== See also ==
- Upper Dir District
