= Toormang-1 =

Attaullah Zarin
- Union Council
- Toormang-1 shekawali
- Country: Pakistan
- Province: Khyber Pakhtunkhwa
- District: Lower Dir

Government

Population (2017)
  - Total: 65,891
- Time zone: UTC+5 (PST)

Toormang-1 shekawali is an administrative unit, known as Union Council, of Lower Dir District in the Khyber Pakhtunkhwa province of Pakistan.

Upper Dir is administratively subdivided into six tehsils which contain a total of 28 Union Councils. Upper Dir is represented in the National Assembly and Provincial Assembly by one elected MNA and three elected MPAs respectively.

== See also ==
- Toormang-2
- Upper Dir District
