= Malik Badshah Saleh =

Pakistani politician

Member of the Provincial Assembly of Khyber Pakhtunkhwa
- In office 13 August 2018 – 18 January 2023
- Succeeded by: Gul Ibrahim Khan
- Constituency: PK-10 (Upper Dir-I)

Personal details
- Party: Pakistan Peoples Party

Malik Badshah Saleh is a Pakistani politician who had been a member of the Provincial Assembly of Khyber Pakhtunkhwa from August 2018 till January 2023.

== Political career ==
He was elected to the Provincial Assembly of Khyber Pakhtunkhwa as a candidate of Pakistan Peoples Party from Constituency PK-10 (Upper Dir-I) in the 2018 Pakistani general election.
