= Toormang-2 =

- Union Council
- Country: Pakistan
- Province: Khyber Pakhtunkhwa
- District: Lower Dir
- Time zone: UTC+5 (PST)

Toormang-2 is a union council of Lower Dir District in Khyber Pakhtunkhwa, Pakistan. Lower Dir District has 6 Tehsils and 37 union councils.

== See also ==
- Toormang-1
- Lower Dir District
