= Barawal Tehsil =

Pakistan tehsil

Barawal is a tehsil in Upper Dir District, Khyber Pakhtunkhwa, Pakistan. It borders Lower Dir District in the east, and Lower Chitral District and Afghanistan's Kunar Province to the north and west. Barawal's area varies in general from 1400 meters to 2100 meters from sea level, with peaks rising to up to 4500 meters.
