= PK-11 Upper Dir-I =

Pakistani electoral district

- Constituency for the Khyber Pakhtunkhwa Assembly
- Region: Sheringal and Kalkot Tehsils and Lajram Tehsil (partly) of Upper Dir District

Current constituency
- Party: Pakistan Peoples Party
- Member: Malik Badshah Saleh
- Created from: PK-92 Upper Dir-II (2002-2018); PK-10 Upper Dir-I (2018-2023)

PK-11 Upper Dir-I (پی کے-11 دیر بالا-1) is a constituency for the Khyber Pakhtunkhwa Assembly of the Khyber Pakhtunkhwa province of Pakistan.

== See also ==
- PK-10 Swat-VIII
- PK-12 Upper Dir-II
