= Kakad =

Coordinates: 34.997°N 72.072°E

Kakad is a small village located in the tehsil of Wari, Upper Dir, Pakistan. Kakad is located four kilometers east of Wari. At tehsil Wari, Kakad is the most developed village as compared to other in the surroundings. The village is located among the green hills from all sides, which make it more beautiful. At Kakad, there are male and female schools, i.e. primary, middle and high, which provide a competitive edge over other neighbouring villages. In whole union council, the more teachers relates to Kakad which shows the education level of the youngster and old respected teacher dedication.
