= Totakan =

Coordinates: 34°37′N 71°50′E

- Union Council
- Totakan
- Interactive map of Totakan
- Country: Pakistan
- Province: Khyber Pakhtunkhwa
- District: Malakand
- Time zone: UTC+5 (PST)

Totakan is a village and Union Council in Malakand District, part of the Khyber Pakhtunkhwa (KP) province of Pakistan. It falls under the administrative framework of Malakand and is located near the town of Batkhela (the district headquarters).

Like many villages in the district, it’s part of a predominantly Pashtun tribal society, often tied to larger tribal groupings such as the Ranizai sub-tribe of the Yousafzai.

One of the famous place located in Totalan is Mizar of Hisar Baba (Syed Ibrahim Shah (also written Shirazi or Bukhari-Sheraz) famously known as Totakan baba zyarat.

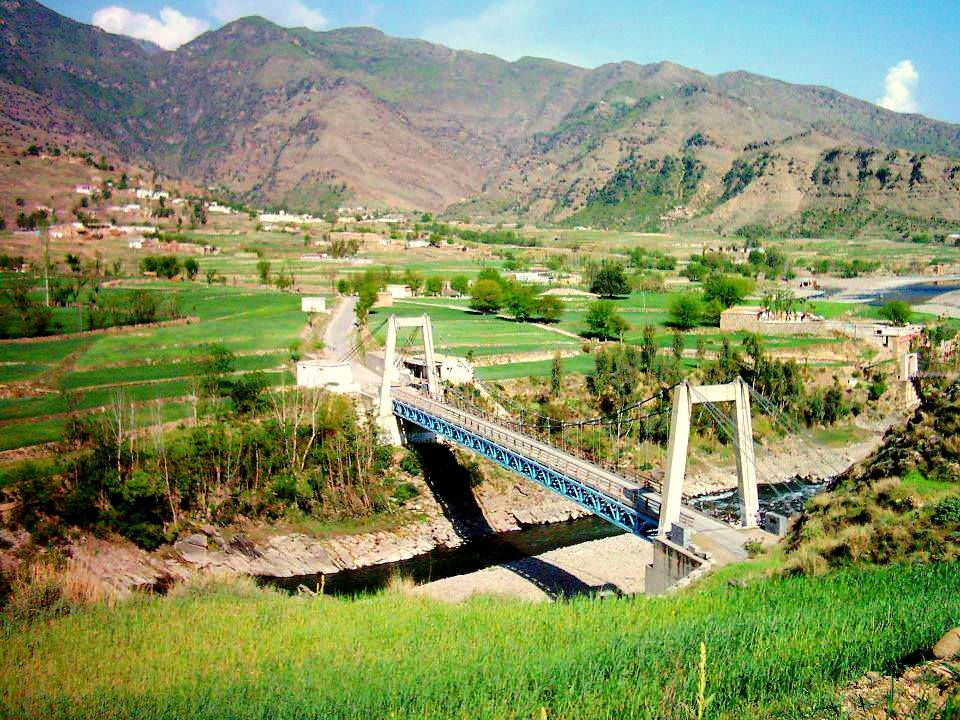
Totakan japan old po

== See also ==
- Malakand District
