= Laram Top =

Hillstation in Khyber Pakhtunkhwa, Pakistan

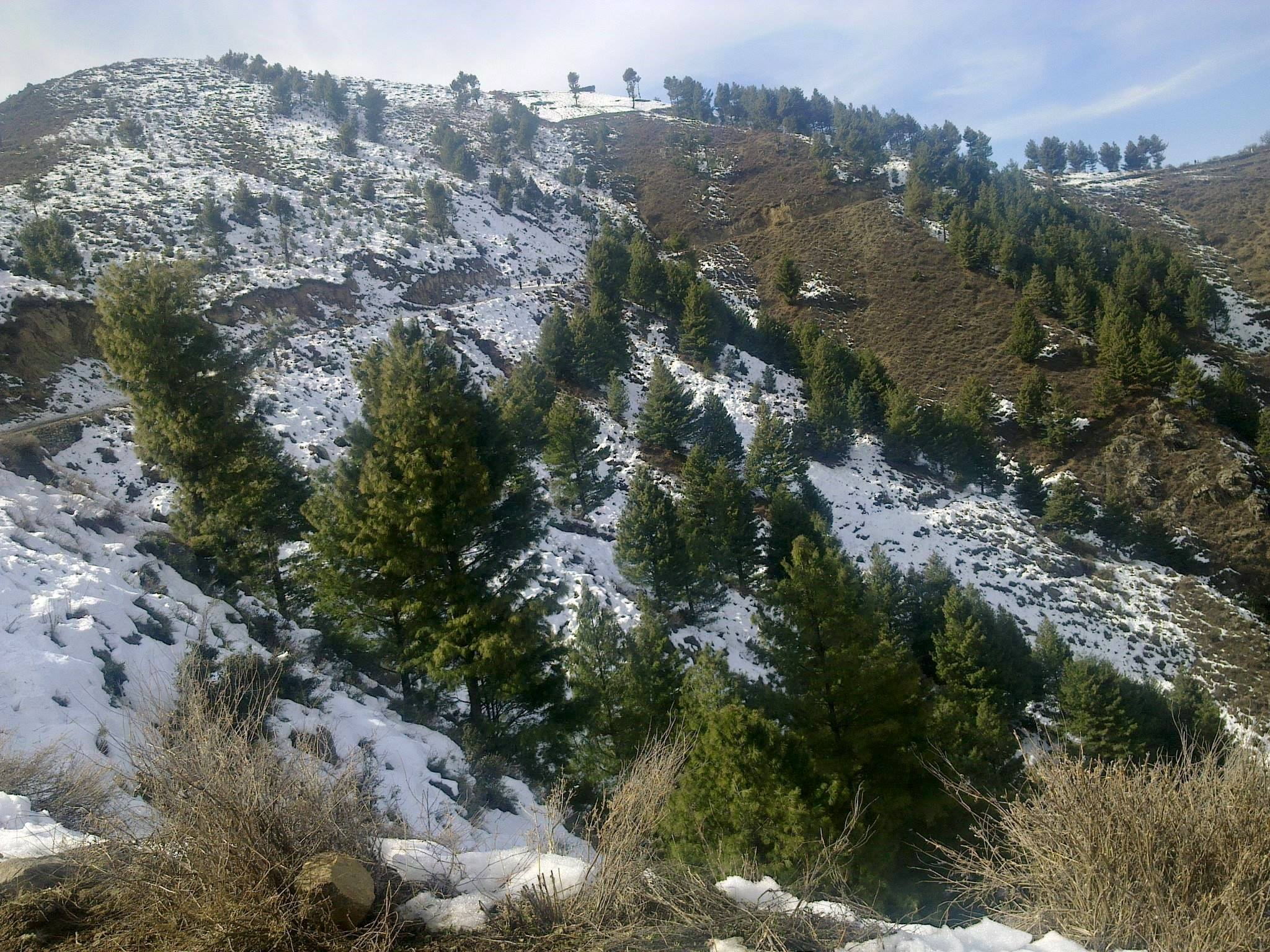
A view from Laram Top

Laram Top also known as "Laram Sar" is a hillstation in Lower Dir District of Khyber Pakhtunkhwa, Pakistan. It is at a distance of 30 km from Chakdara and 180 km from Peshawar. It is located at an elevation of 2,591 meters above sea level. It is a mountain peak in Dir (Lower) that is often known as “radar” because of the multiple radar being instilled there especially for communication purposes.

== See also ==
- Kumrat Valley
- Jakar Baba Top
