= Prof Dr Zia Ul Haq =

Pakistani academic and public health professional

Prof. Dr. Zia Ul Haq

Zia Ul Haq is a Pakistani academic and public health professional. He has ranked among top 1.7% of researchers worldwide. He has served as vice-chancellor of Khyber Medical University (KMU) from 17th July 2020 to 21st August 2026. Appointed at age 40, he was the youngest vice-chancellor in the country. He remained president of Pakistan Network of Quality Assurance in Higher Education (PNQAHE).

Meritorious Professor Dr. Zia Ul Haq has been appointed as the Executive Director (ED) of the Higher Education Commission (HEC) of Pakistan for a period of 4 years (Dec 2025-Nov 2029). The ED position holds fundamental strategic importance within Pakistan's higher education framework. As the ex-officio Secretary of the Commission and the principal accounting officer responsible for managing financial flows exceeding PKR 800 billion, the ED oversees the HEC Secretariat, the operational body tasked with implementing the Commission's policies, directives, and decisions. The role includes direct supervision of quality assurance mechanisms, development and funding initiatives, governance reforms, and national-level academic programs.

Zia Ul Haq has been ranked among the top 2% of scientists in the world, according to the latest global ranking released by Stanford University, United States. It identifies the world's most influential scientists across all disciplines, based on standardised citation indicators and verified data

In 2024, Zia was awarded the Sitara-i-Imtiaz, one of Pakistan's highest civilian honours, for contributions to higher education and public health. The award was presented on Pakistan Day, March 23, 2025 by the President of Pakistan.

== Early life ==
Zia was born in Upper Dir, Pakistan. He is married to Anjum Naz, a radiologist with four children.

Zia completed his Bachelor of Medicine, Bachelor of Surgery (MBBS) in 2005 from Khyber Medical College. He earned a Master in Public Health from Gandhara University in 2007. He completed his PhD in public health from University of Glasgow, UK, which was sponsored by the government of Pakistan.

He received the Fellowship of the College of Physicians and Surgeons (FCPS) in Community Medicine from the College of Physicians and Surgeons Pakistan (CPSP), the Fellowship of the Faculty of Public Health, Royal College of Physicians, UK, and Masters in Medical Education, Diploma in Life Style Medicine.

== Academic career ==
Zia became the first lecturer of public health and Pioneer Faculty at Khyber Medical University. He joined KMU in January, 2009 as a lecturer in public health and remained until 2014. In 2014, he was promoted to assistant professor.

He established Khyber Pakhtunkhwa's first Public Health Reference Laboratory and introduced the inaugural PhD program in public health and family medicine.

He serves as a visiting professor in the School of Health and Wellbeing, UK.

== Recognition ==
- Appointed first Professor of Public Health in Pakistan (2018)
- Youngest Vice Chancellor in Pakistan (2020)
- Best Young Scholar Award by the Higher Education Commission (2019)
- Sitara-i-Imtiaz (nominated in 2024)
- Sitara-i-Imtiaz (2025)
- BPS-22 Meritorious Professor by Senate of KMU (2024)
- Ranked among Top 2% in the World (2025)
