= Panjkora River =

Panjkora دریائے پنجکوڑہ پنجکوړه سيند
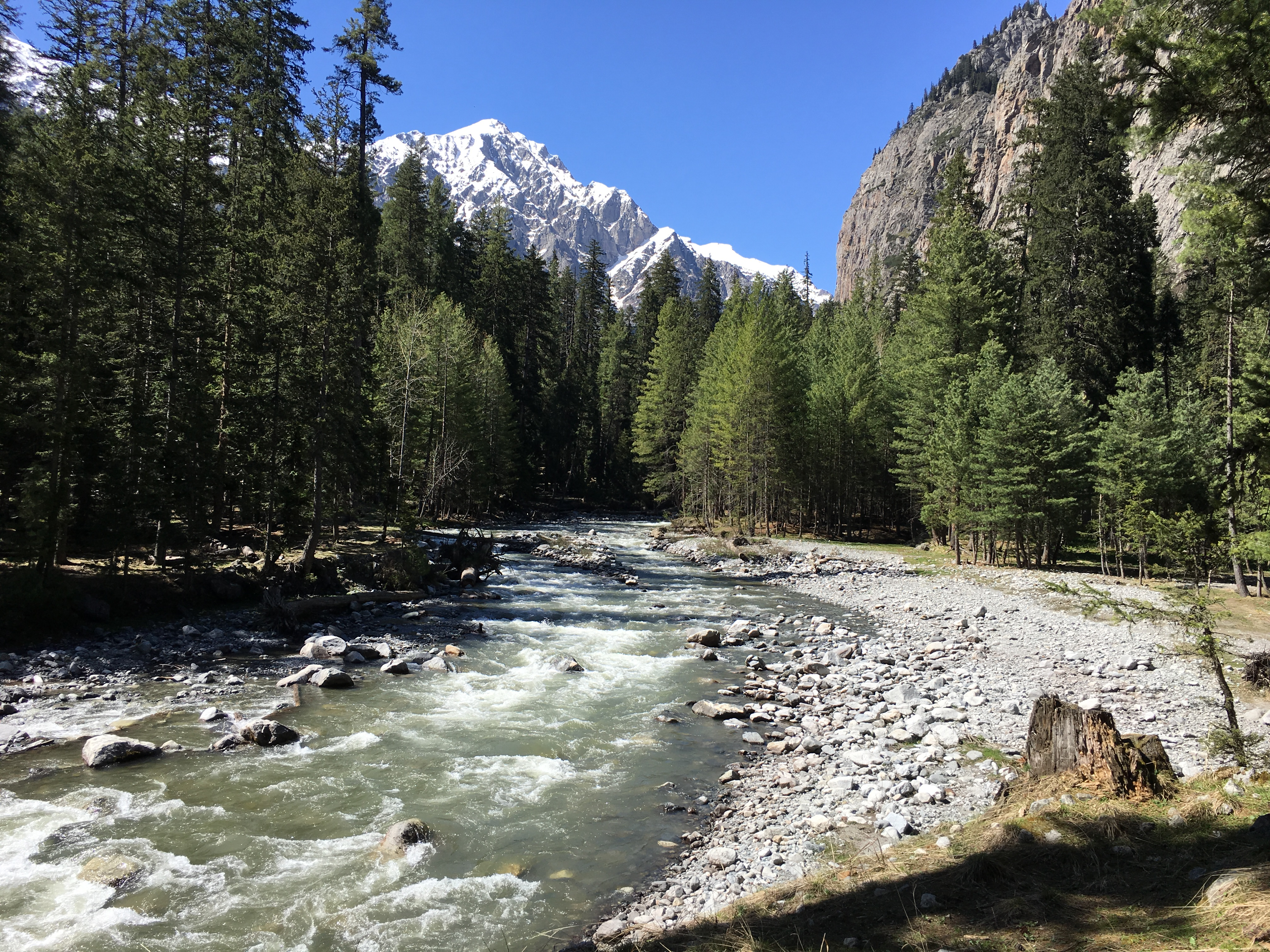
- The upper reaches of the Panjkora River in the Kumrat Valley

- Location within Khyber Pakhtunkhwa

Location
- Country: Pakistan
- province: Khyber Pakhtunkhwa
- Region: Upper Dir

Physical characteristics
- Source: Hindu Kush Mountains
  - elevation: 3,600 m (11,800 ft)
- Mouth: Swat River
  - location: Chakdara
- Length: 220 km (140 mi)

Basin features
- Tributaries
  - left: Ushirai Khwar, Niag Khwar
  - right: Baraul Khwar, Jandol Khwar

The Panjkora River (Urdu: دریائے پنجکوڑہ) is a river in the Khyber Pakhtunkhwa province in north-west Pakistan. The river runs through the mountainous Panjkora Valley of the province. It passes across Thal, Dir, Timergara, and joins with Swat River near Chakdara. It is generally characterized by steep slopes on either side of the riverbank covered in thick forests. The river has a large catchment area, making the river susceptible to significant flooding – most notably during the 2010 floods that occurred throughout much of Pakistan.

== Etymology ==
According to one source, the name derives from two words panj (lit. five) and kora (lit. flowing water), named so because five streams combine to form the river. The five streams are Kumrat-Kohistan stream, Gwaldai stream, Sherengal stream, Dir stream, and Barwal stream. According to another tradition, the river was named after Panjkor, the ancestor of Gawri people of the Upper Panjkora Valley, and derived its name from panj (lit. five) and kor (lit. house), after his five sons who founded the settlements in the valley.

== Course ==
The Panjkora river is the main river in the Panjkora River Basin which is a part of the larger Swat River Basin. The main tributaries of the Panjkora are rivers Dir, Barwal, Kohistan, and Usherai. The flow of water occurs year-round, though the water levels drastically rise during the monsoon season (June – September). Large volumes of water flow through the Panjkora during this time with greater amounts at the mouths of the tributaries. The water flow is quite powerful, causing floods throughout the region.

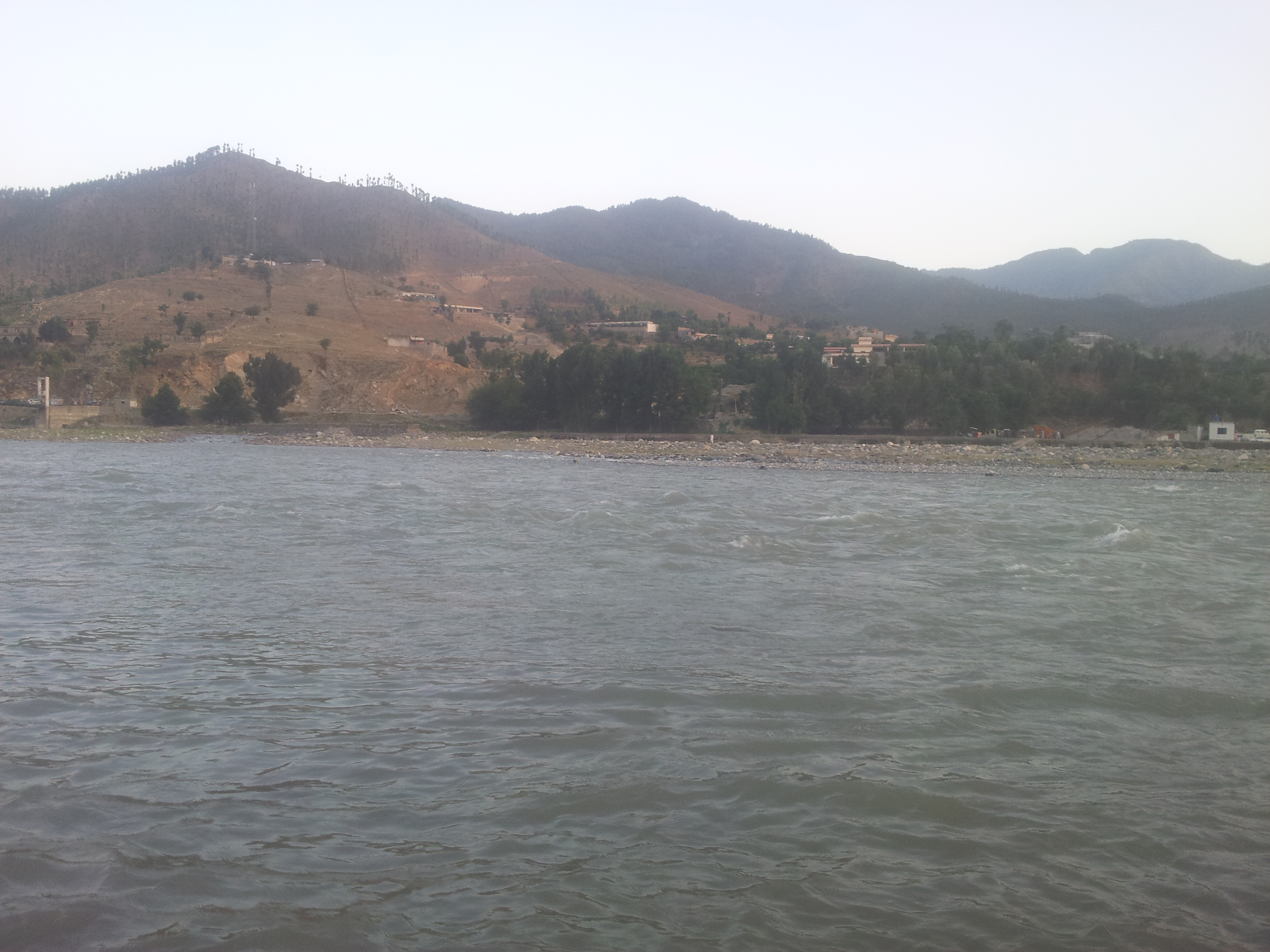
The river Panjkora in heavy stream towards the mouth.

The Panjkora river is located at coordinates: Latitude: 34.6667 and Longitude: 71.7667. The river is characterised by steep mountain slopes at the beginning, these act as a funnel trapping the water. Towards the end the river starts to widen, and the flood plain begins to sprawl. The lower flood plains are the main agricultural land used by farmers due to the increased nutrient content in the soil.

The river's headwaters are high in the glaciers of Hindu Kush Mountains. It flows south through the Upper Dir District and the Lower Dir District. Its confluence with the Swat River is in the Malakand District near Totakan. The Swat River is a tributary of the Kabul River, part of the Indus River basin.

== Environmental issues ==
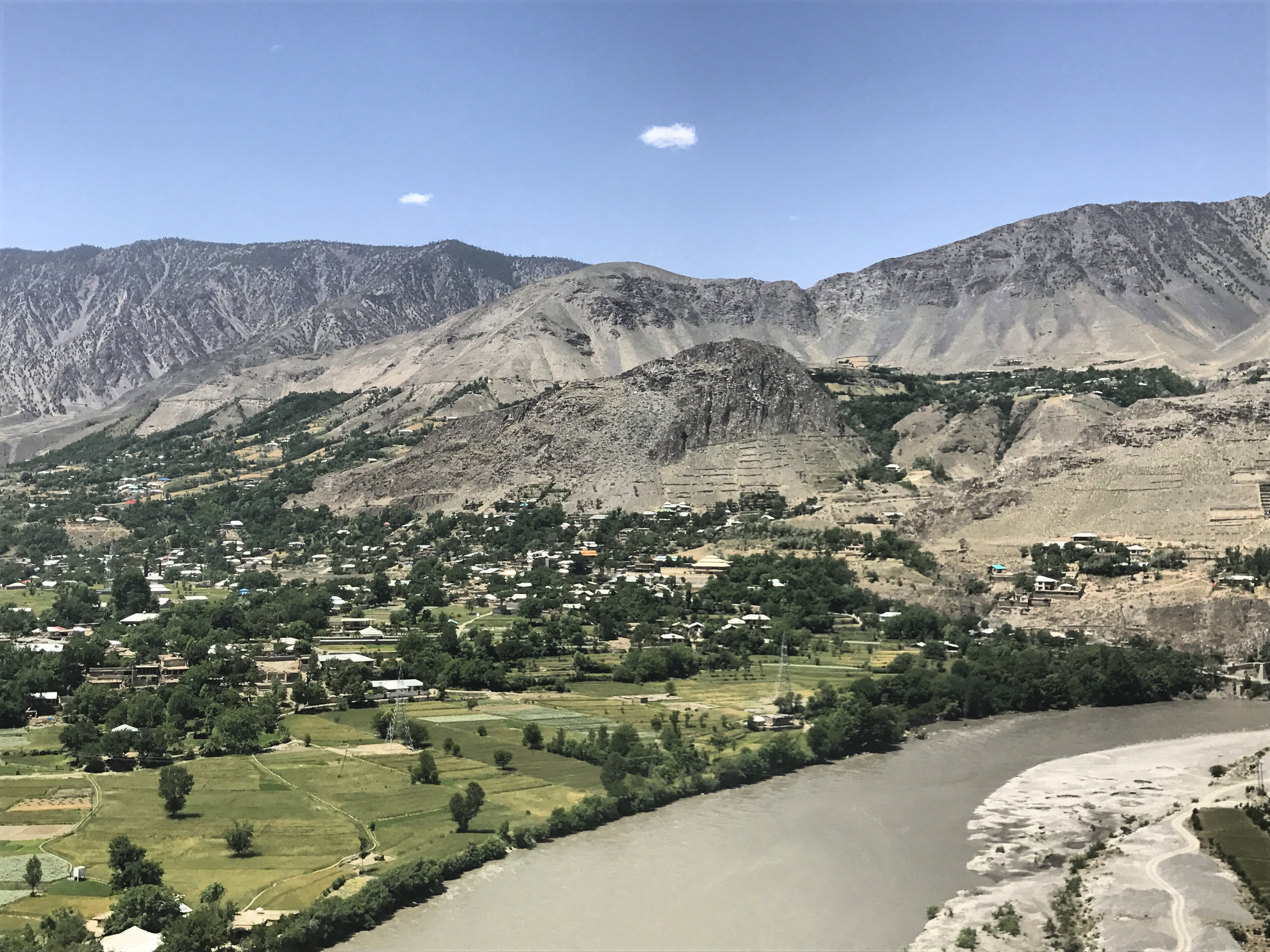
The Panjkora River floodplains near the Swat River.

=== Pollution ===
Bioaccumulation is the major environmental concern currently occurring in the river Panjkora. Bioaccumulation occurs when a species absorbs substances faster than it expels them. This often has increased effects on predators higher up the food chain which can affect humans who digest these organisms. Panjkora river faces increases in toxic metal accumulation in fish species. Metal content found in fish increases the closer you move to the mouth of the river Panjkora. The metal content occurs because of agricultural practices and sewage dumping in the river.

Agriculture, while being the major industry supporting people living on the river, does come with its downsides. During large rainfall events, huge amounts of runoff occurs, dragging with it the soil, animal droppings and fertilisers. This floods the river with large amounts of lead (Pb) and nickel (Ni). Ni very consistently increased the closer towards the mouth of the river. It is thought that the marble industry effluents were another major source of increase in Ni. The contamination of heavy metals has not yet become a serious health issue for the people who survive off the river. Scientists, however, predict that if not carefully monitored bioaccumulation continues to manifest and accumulate, potentially causing significant health risks to the environment and human health.

=== Natural disasters ===
The Panjkora basin is a temperamental region that is very dependent on the season. The climate in this region of Pakistan is characterised by large downpours during the monsoon season (June- September) and relatively dry winters. The monsoon seasons have caused many significant and devastating floods in the region. Most notably a flood in 2010 swept through the river resulting in loss of life and much destruction to ecosystems and infrastructure. These high levels of seasonal rainfall are magnified by the topography of the land surrounding the river. Steep slopes on either side of the river allow for water to runoff into the river quickly and in large volumes. While rainfall in these higher altitudes is generally less, the combination of the huge basins tributaries makes for large volumes of water towards the mouth of the river Panjkora. With river systems floods are generally much more likely to occur in the low-lying areas towards the base of the mountains. Panjkora basin has 15% of its area classified as highly prone to flooding. These areas that are flood prone are also inhabited making for a deadly mix of people gambling their lives for the rich alluvial farmland. This then continues to run down the river destroying agricultural land, taking lives and causing infrastructure damage.

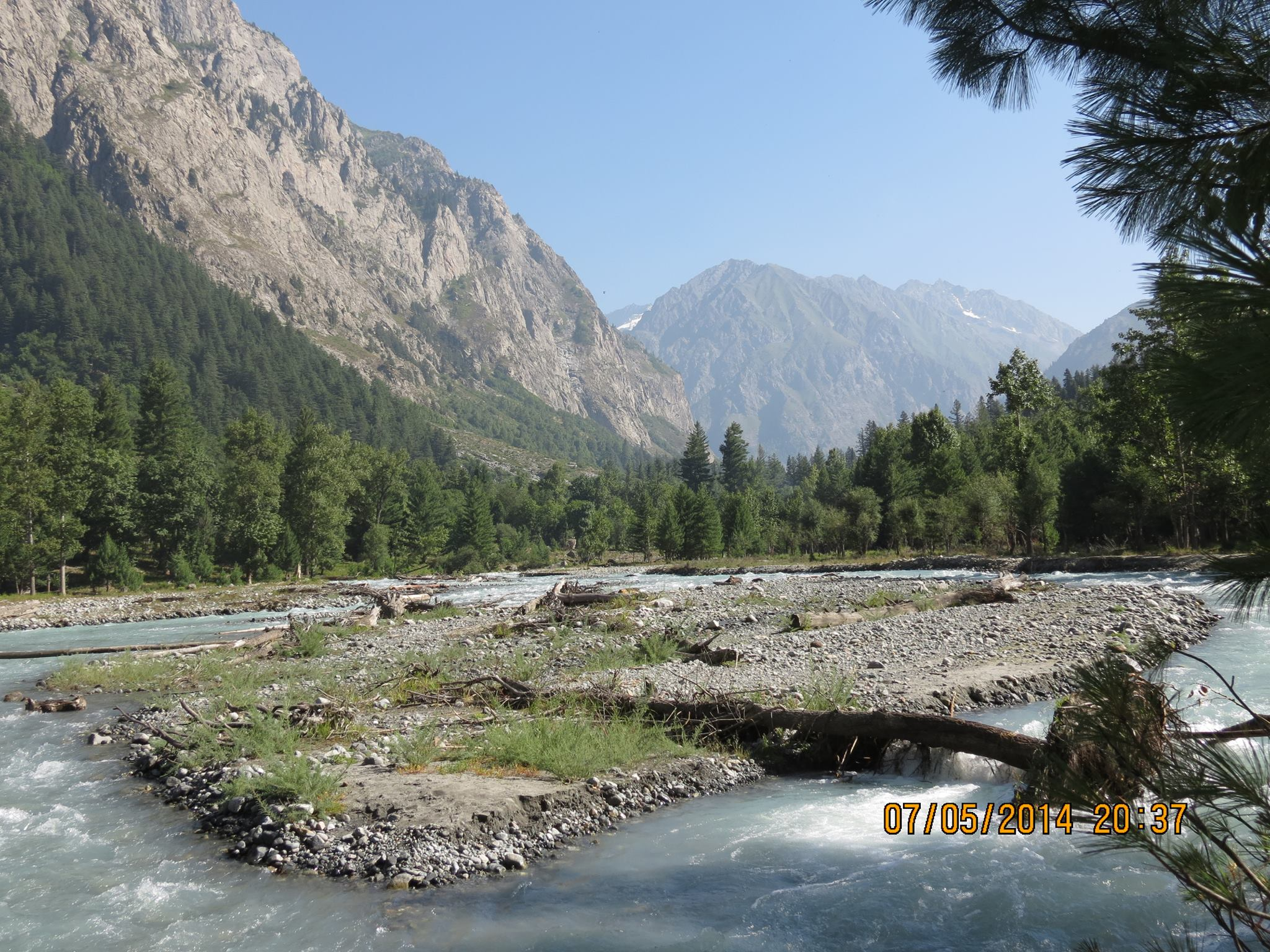
Panjkora River, Lower Dir. The edges of the river can be incredibly steep creating the high velocity runoff seen during the floods.

== Socio-economic impact ==
The Panjkora River is the natural habitat of trout and other freshwater fish sought by anglers. The most common species are cyprinids. Snowtrout (Schizothorax plagiostomus) is most common game fish in the upper part of River Panjkora at Kumrat Valley. Brown trout and rainbow trout are exotic species, they were introduced by the British in 1928, while snow trout and other cyprinids are native species of River Panjkora. Farmers along the river rely heavily on the rich alluvial soil the flood plains offer. Poor education and management practices mean that the soil often remains fallow for parts of the year.

== See also ==
- Rivers of Khyber Pakhtunkhwa
