= Sheringal =

Coordinates: 35°17′N 72°00′E

Hazrat islam
- Union Council
- Interactive map of Hazrat islam
- Country: Pakistan
- Province: Khyber Pakhtunkhwa
- District: Upper Dir

Government
  - Nazim: Shah Wali (PPP)
- Elevation: 1,369 m (4,491 ft)
- Time zone: UTC+5 (PST)

Sheringal is an administrative unit, known as Union Council, of Upper Dir District in the Khyber Pakhtunkhwa province of Pakistan.

Upper Dir is administratively subdivided into six tehsils which contain a total of 28 Union Councils. Upper Dir is represented in the National Assembly and Provincial Assembly by one elected MNA and three elected MPAs respectively.

Major Places in Sheringal are Shaheed Benazeer Bhutto University. Major Personality of Sheringal in history books (Gumnam Riysat) is Malak Abd-us-Salam the right hand of Nawab-e-Dir.
