= Dir (city) =

Dir دیر
- City
- Location within Khyber Pakhtunkhwa Location within Pakistan
- Coordinates: 35°12′24″N 71°52′36″E
- Country: Pakistan
- Province: Khyber Pakhtunkhwa
- District: Upper Dir District
- Elevation: 1,420 m (4,660 ft)

Population (2023)
  - Total: 47,828
- Time zone: UTC+5 (PKT)
- Postal code: 18000

Dir (Urdu, Pashto: دیر) is a city in the Upper Dir District of the Khyber-Pakhtunkhwa province of Pakistan. It is sometimes known as Dir Khas (Proper Dir) to distinguish it from the district's name, Dir (Upper and Lower). It lies along the Dir River, a tributary of the Panjkora River. It is at the base of the Lowarai Pass, the main road to Chitral.

== History ==
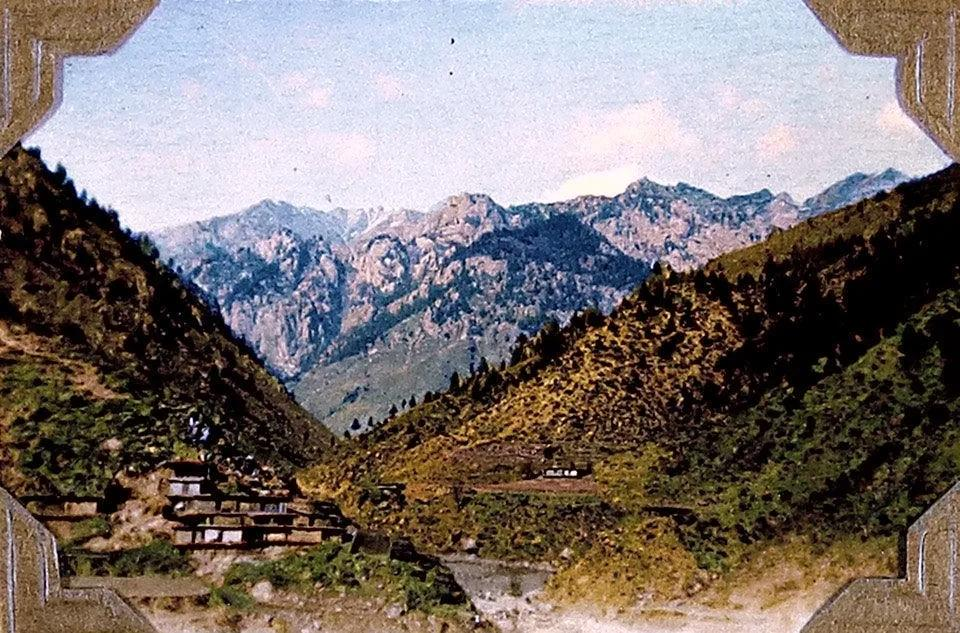
A photograph of Dir Village in 1930

Dir was founded in the 17th century. Mullā Ilyās, a 17th-century holy man, is said to have been the founder. It was the capital of the former princely state of Dir, until its full incorporation into Pakistan in 1969. The former royal palace is on a hill above the city. Dir was then the capital of the Dir District. When the Dir District was divided in 1996 into Upper and Lower Dir, Dir city and Timergara became its district headquarters respectively. Yusufzay Pashtuns make up the primary ethnic group in the region and in the city.

== Demographics ==
=== Population ===
Historical population
Year	Pop.	±% p.a.
1951	...	—
1961	...	—
1972	...	—
1981	...	—
1998	22,901	—
2017	44,100	+3.51%
2023	47,842	+1.37%

The population of city in 1998 was 22,901 but according to the 2023 Census of Pakistan, the population has risen to 47,842.

== Climate ==
Like most of the southern slopes of Khyber Pakhtunkhwa, Dir has a humid subtropical climate (Köppen Cfa). Owing to the city's exposed location, rainfall from frontal cyclones from the west is heavier than in any other part of Pakistan, and their passage, as well as very penetrative monsoonal periods, are usually accompanied by heavy thunderstorms.

Climate data for Dir, Khyber Pakhtunkhwa
Month	Jan	Feb	Mar	Apr	May	Jun	Jul	Aug	Sep	Oct	Nov	Dec	Year
Record high °C (°F)	22.2 (72.0)	23.9 (75.0)	30.6 (87.1)	33.9 (93.0)	38.1 (100.6)	41.5 (106.7)	38.1 (100.6)	37.4 (99.3)	35.0 (95.0)	33.9 (93.0)	28.0 (82.4)	23.0 (73.4)	41.5 (106.7)
Mean daily maximum °C (°F)	11.3 (52.3)	12.0 (53.6)	16.1 (61.0)	22.5 (72.5)	27.9 (82.2)	32.4 (90.3)	31.2 (88.2)	30.1 (86.2)	28.9 (84.0)	25.3 (77.5)	20.1 (68.2)	13.9 (57.0)	22.6 (72.7)
Daily mean °C (°F)	4.4 (39.9)	5.3 (41.5)	9.5 (49.1)	15.0 (59.0)	19.8 (67.6)	23.9 (75.0)	25.1 (77.2)	24.2 (75.6)	21.2 (70.2)	16.3 (61.3)	11.2 (52.2)	6.4 (43.5)	15.1 (59.2)
Mean daily minimum °C (°F)	−2.5 (27.5)	−1.5 (29.3)	3.0 (37.4)	7.6 (45.7)	11.6 (52.9)	15.5 (59.9)	19.1 (66.4)	18.3 (64.9)	13.5 (56.3)	7.3 (45.1)	2.4 (36.3)	−1.2 (29.8)	7.8 (46.0)
Record low °C (°F)	−10.6 (12.9)	−13.9 (7.0)	−4.4 (24.1)	−1.1 (30.0)	2.9 (37.2)	8.3 (46.9)	10.0 (50.0)	7.9 (46.2)	3.3 (37.9)	0.1 (32.2)	−7.2 (19.0)	−9.4 (15.1)	−13.9 (7.0)
Average precipitation mm (inches)	120.6 (4.75)	176.7 (6.96)	253.7 (9.99)	178 (7.0)	86.1 (3.39)	54.4 (2.14)	160.0 (6.30)	168.6 (6.64)	83.7 (3.30)	50.3 (1.98)	58.1 (2.29)	90.3 (3.56)	1,480.5 (58.3)
Mean monthly sunshine hours	131.6	129.7	145.8	195.4	254.2	282.4	247.1	223.8	224.1	221.7	202.5	140.0	2,398.3
Source: NOAA (1971-1990)

== See also ==
- Upper Dir District
- Lower Dir District
- Chitral District
