= PK-13 Upper Dir-III =

Pakistani electoral district

- Constituency for the Khyber Pakhtunkhwa Assembly
- Region: Dir Tehsil and Lajram Tehsil (partly) of Upper Dir District

Current constituency
- Party: Muttahida Majlis-e-Amal
- Member(s): Inayatullah Khan
- Created from: PK-91 Upper Dir-I (2002-2018); PK-12 Upper Dir-III (2018-2023)

PK-13 Upper Dir-III (پی کے-13 دیر بالا-3) is a constituency for the Khyber Pakhtunkhwa Assembly of the Khyber Pakhtunkhwa province of Pakistan.

== See also ==
- PK-12 Upper Dir-II
- PK-14 Lower Dir-I
