= PK-12 Upper Dir-II =

Constituency of the Khyber Pakhtunkhwa Assembly, Pakistan

- Constituency for the Khyber Pakhtunkhwa Assembly
- Region: Wari Tehsil of Upper Dir District

Current constituency
- Party: Independent
- Member: Muhammad Yamin
- Created from: PK-93 Upper Dir-III (2002-2018); PK-11 Upper Dir-II (2018-2023)

PK-12 Upper Dir-II (پی کے-12 دیر بالا-2) is a constituency for the Khyber Pakhtunkhwa Assembly of the Khyber Pakhtunkhwa province of Pakistan.

== Election 2002 ==
General elections were held on 10 October 2002.

== Election 2008 ==
General elections were held on 2008

Contesting candidates	Party affiliation	Votes polled
M.Shah Zubair	Pakistan Peoples Party Parliamentarians	6012
Shameen Khan	Awami National Party	1577
Akhoon Zada Sikandar Hazrat	Pakistan Muslim League	4003
Malik JehanZeb Khan	Pakistan Muslim League (N)	5882
Hayat Khan	Independent	8131
Molana Abdullah Banori	Muttahida Majlis-e-Amal	479
Ayoub Said	Independent	154
Dr Bahramand Khan	Independent	145

== Election 2013 ==
General elections were held in Pakistan on 11 May 2013 to elect the members of Provincial Assembly Of Khyber-Pakhtunkhwa.

Voting Statistics of Constituency		Registered Votes	132335
Votes Polled	40236
Valid Votes	40065
Rejected Votes	1345
Percentage of Votes Polled to Registered Voters	30.40 %

Contesting candidates	Party affiliation	Votes polled
Akhunzada Hidayat Khan	All Pakistan Muslim League	46
Behram Khan	Jamaat-e-Islami Pakistan	13580
Altaf Hussain	Independent	71
Sahib Zada Sanaullah	Pakistan Peoples Party Parliamentarians	9799
Amir Zaman Khan	Awami National Party	1626
M. Fakhar Hayat	Pakistan Muslim League (N)	7975
Muhammad Sajjad Khan	Pakistan Tehreek-e-Insaf	6158
Hidayat Ullah Khan	Jamiat Ulama-e-Islam (F)	637
Dr Behramand Khan	Independent	173

== Disqualification ==
Jamaat-e-Islami MPA Malik Behram Khan disqualified over fake degree. He was elected as MPA on a JI ticket from Constituency PK-93 (Upper Dir-III) in the general elections, 2013.

The runner-up candidate of Pakistan People's Party (PPP), Sahibzada Sanaullah had challenged Behram's victory, alleging that the JI candidate had submitted a fake bachelor's degree with his nomination papers for the 2013 general election.

The Election Tribunal's presiding officer Justice (R) Shah Jee Rehman issued the verdict on an election petition of rival candidate from Pakistan People's Party, Sahibzada Sanaullah, who accused the MPA of possessing dubious graduation degree and impersonation during an examination.

"After hearing arguments from both the parties, examining statements of official witnesses and records of Malakand University regarding BA degree, the JI MPA does not fulfill the requirements of Sadiq and ‘Ameen under Articles 62 and 63 of the Constitution and thus he stands disqualified as MPA of the Khyber Pakhtunkhwa Assembly," the tribunal stated in its short order. -

The university cancelled the degree of Malik Behram on ground of impersonation. It had observed that different persons had appeared instead of him to take the graduation part-1 and part-2 examinations in 2005 and 2007, respectively.

Upon enquiry and verification of the degree from the University of Malakand, the tribunal found the allegations against Behram to be true. The tribunal has directed the Election Commission of Pakistan to hold re-election in the constituency.

The JI candidate had secured 13,580 votes followed by 9,799 votes in favour of the PPP candidate. Behram is currently the chairman of the standing committee on finance and a member of the committees on administration, home and tribal affairs and communication and works.

== Re-Election In PK-93 ==
Pakistan People's Party's (PPP) Sahibzada Sanaullah has defeated Malik Azam (son of Malik Behram Khan, former MPA) of Jamaat Islami (JI) in Upper Dir PK-93 by-election. The seat fell vacant after disqualification of former MPA Behram Khan of Jamaat-e-Islami in a fake degree case in July. According to details, Sahibzada Sanaullah bagged 23,291 votes while the runner-up Malik Azam could only secure 19,290 votes. Sanaullah won by a margin of 4001 votes while the turnout remained around 33%. It was considered to be JI's stronghold previously.

Voting Statistics of Constituency		Registered Votes	132335
Votes Polled	40236
Valid Votes	43089
Rejected Votes	1026
Percentage of Votes Polled to Registered Voters	33 %

Contesting candidates	Party affiliation	Votes polled	Azam Khan	Jamaat-e-Islami Pakistan	19290
Jamshed Khan	Independent	398
Sahibzada Sanaullah	Pakistan Peoples Party Parliamentarians	23291
Shah Faisal	Independent	110

== Election 2024 ==
General elections were held on 8 February 2024.

Contesting candidates	Party affiliation	Votes polled
Muhammad Yamin	Independent	23915
Azam Khan	Jamaat-e-Islami Pakistan	12531
Sahibzada Sanaullah	Pakistan Peoples Party	12236
Amir Zaman Khan	Awami National Party	12123
Amir Nawaz Khan	Pakistan Muslim League (N)	1806
Umar Zamin	Independent	1123
Javed Khan	Independent	489
Zoriat Bibi	PTIP	91

== See also ==
- PK-11 Upper Dir-I
- PK-13 Upper Dir-III
