= Upper Dir District =

District in Khyber Pakhtunkhwa, Pakistan

Coordinates: 35°12′15″N 71°52′20″E

Upper Dir District ضلع دیر بالا پورتنۍ دیر اولسوالۍ
- District of Khyber Pakhtunkhwa
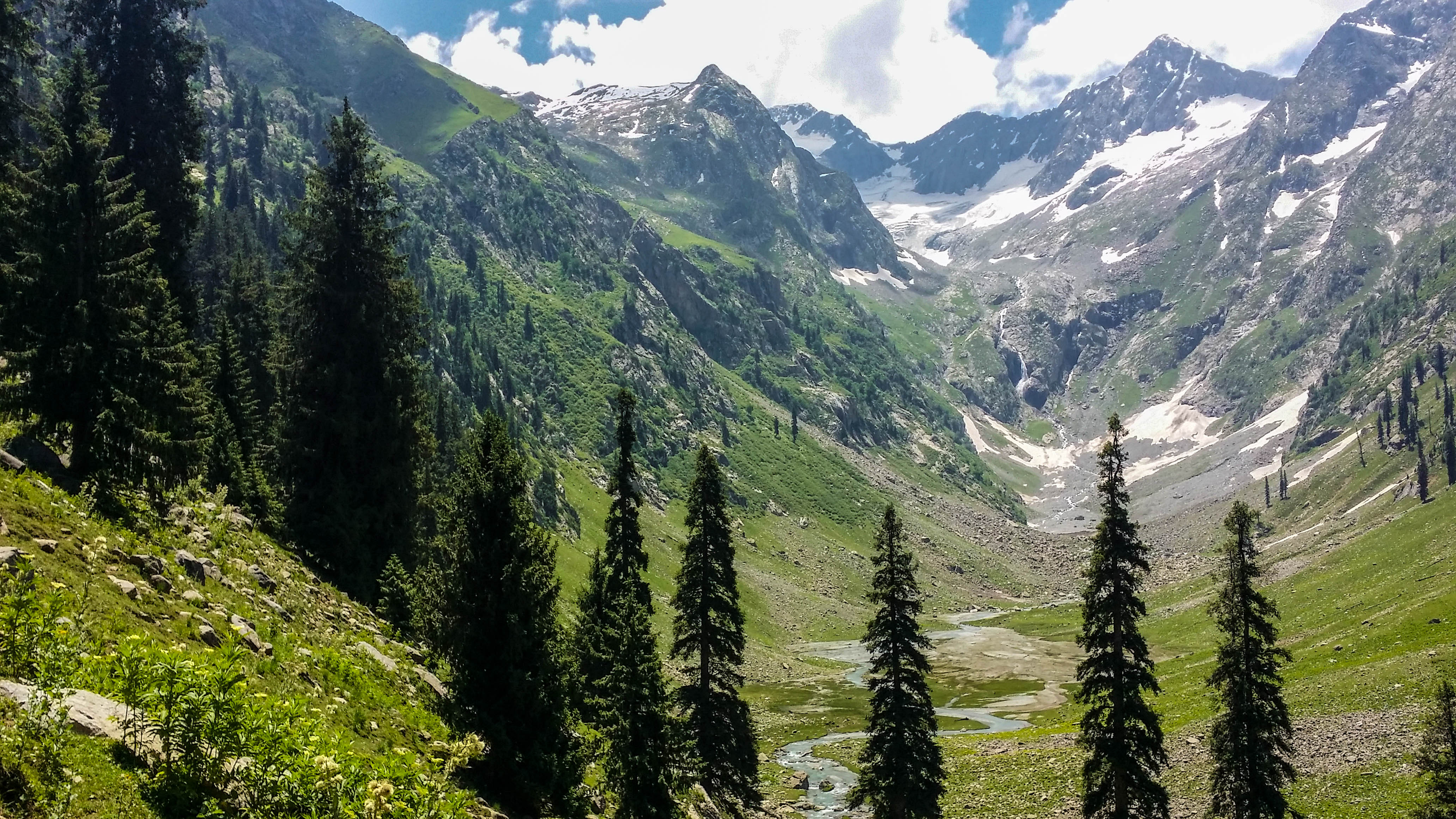
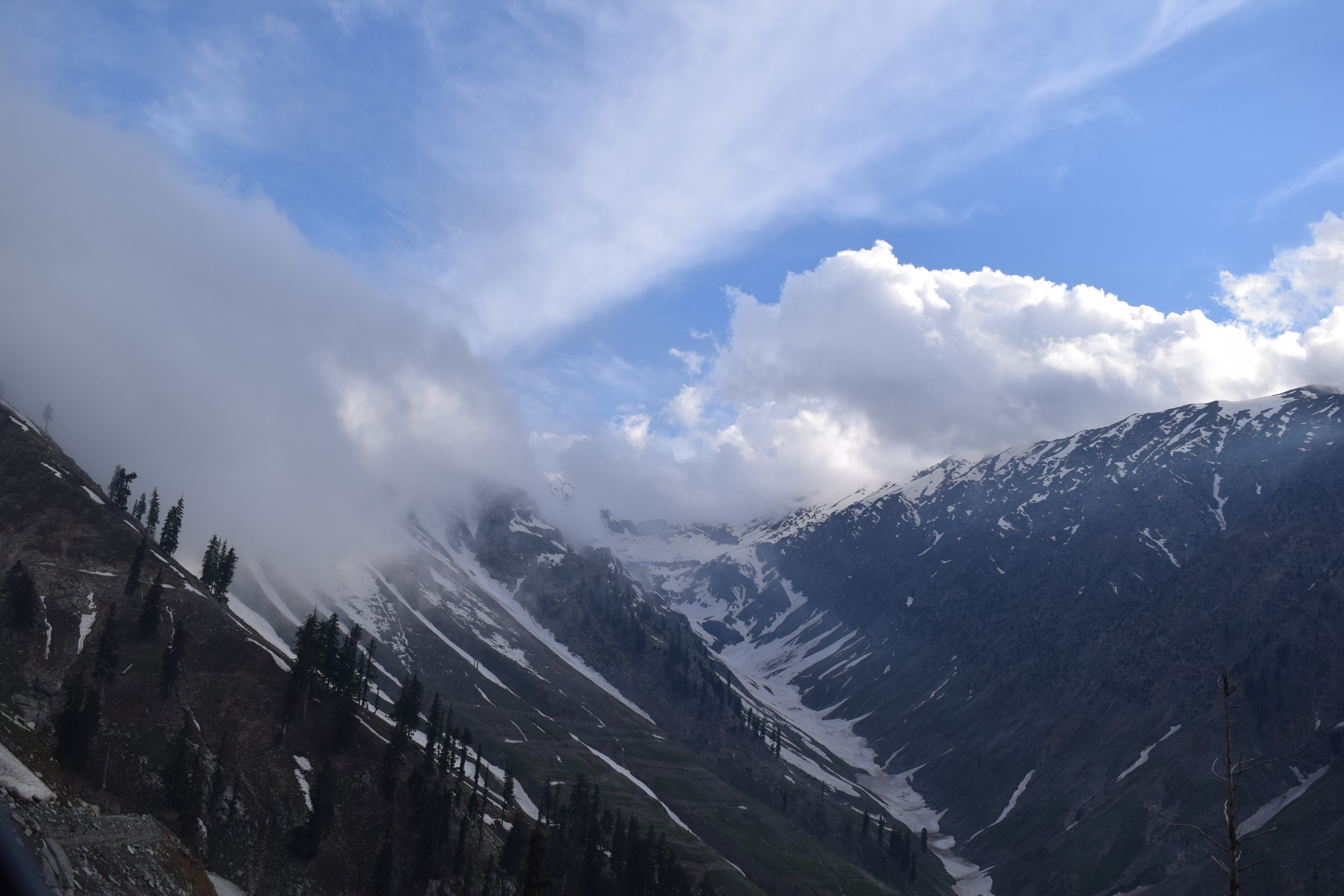
- Top: Jahaz Banda in Kumrat valley Bottom: Lowaro Top

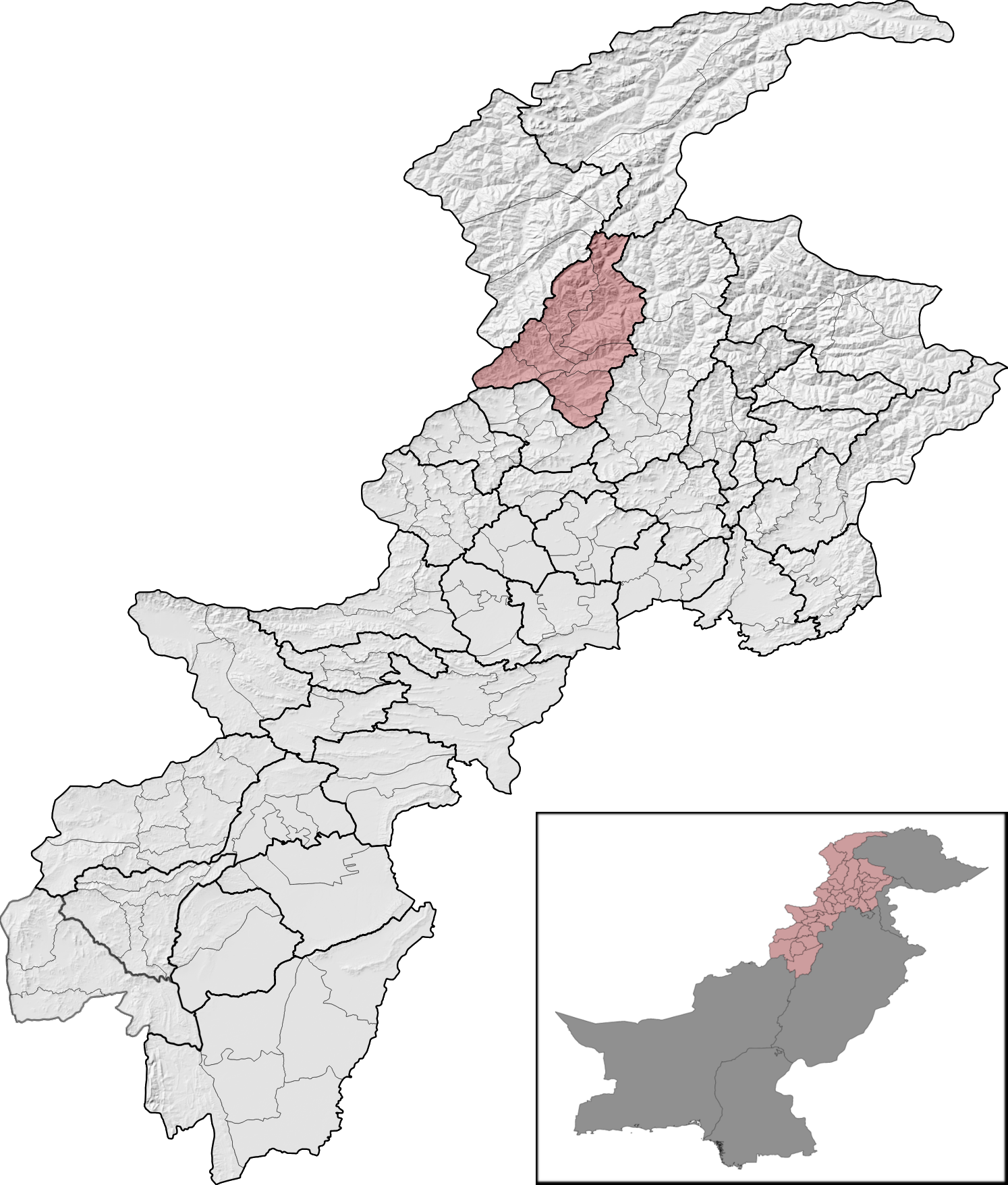
- District (red) in Khyber Pakhtunkhwa
- Country: Pakistan
- Province: Khyber Pakhtunkhwa
- Division: Malakand
- Established: 1996
- Headquarters: Dir

Government
  - Type: District Administration
  - Deputy Commissioner: Naveed Akbar (BPS-18 PAS)
  - District Police Officer: Syed Muhammad Bilal (BPS-18 PSP)
  - District Health Officer: Dr. Ikhtiar Ali

Area
  - District of Khyber Pakhtunkhwa: 3,699 km^{2} (1,428 sq mi)

Population (2023)
  - District of Khyber Pakhtunkhwa: 1,083,566
  - Density: 292.9/km^{2} (758.7/sq mi)
  - Urban: 47,842
  - Rural: 1,035,724

Languages
  - Official: English, Urdu
  - Spoken: Pashto, Hindko, Kohistani, Gujari

Literacy
  - Literacy rate: Total: 46.77%; Male: 62.76%; Female: 31.67%
- Time zone: UTC+5 (PST)
- Number of Tehsils: 6
- Website: dirupper.kp.gov.pk

Upper Dir District (Pashto: پورتنۍ دیر اولسوالۍ, Urdu: ضلع دیر بالا) is a district located in the Malakand Division of Khyber Pakhtunkhwa province of Pakistan. The city of Dir is its district headquarter. Geographically, it is located in the northern part of Pakistan. It borders with the Chitral district on the north, Afghanistan on the northwest, the Swat district on the east, and the Lower Dir district on the south. The District shares a 40 kilometer to 50 kilometer-long border with Afghanistan.

== History ==
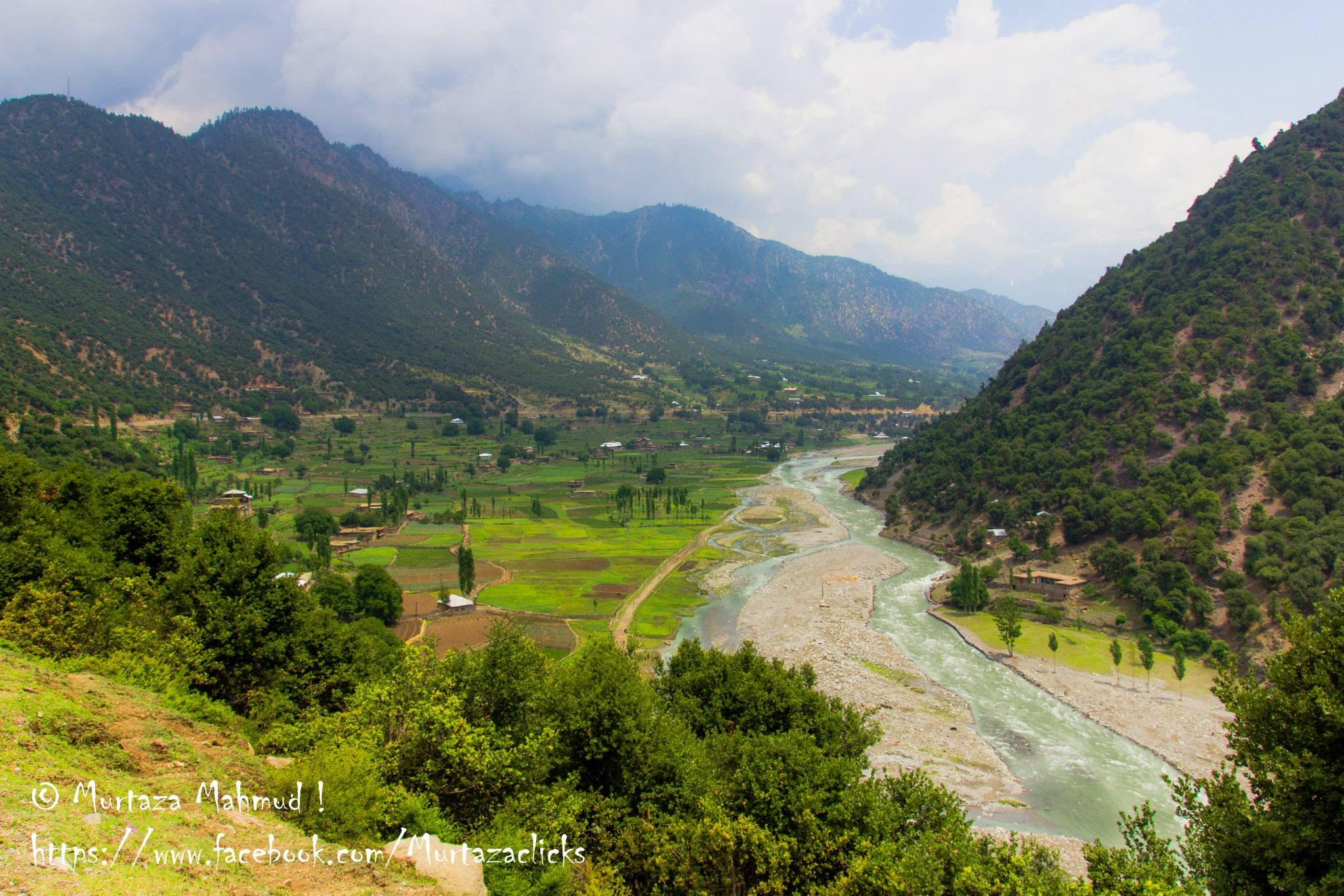
Kalkot Kumrat valley, Kakad,{Doag Dair}°Upper Dir

Dir was home to various popular civilizations. It has been the place where the Aryans, the Buddhists, and the Mughals survived. Dir was also a home to the Gandhara civilization. It was invaded by Alexander the Great.

In 1898, Muhammad Sharif Khan was declared the Nawab of Dir. He was succeeded by his son Nawab Aurang Zeb Khan in 1904, who ruled until his death in 1925. Subsequently, his son Shah Jehan Khan succeeded him; Shah ruled the state for almost 35 years. At the time of the independence of Pakistan in 1947, Dir was still a princely state, separated from Pakistan. It was no later than 1969 when it was annexed with the Khyber Pakhtunkhwa province of Pakistan. Until 1996, Dir was a unit combined district. However, in 1996, the Dir District was divided into Upper and Lower Dir districts.

== Demographics ==
=== Population ===
Historical population
Year	Pop.	±% p.a.
1972	251,045	—
1981	362,565	+4.17%
1998	575,858	+2.76%
2017	947,401	+2.65%
2023	1,083,566	+2.26%

As of the 2023 census, Upper Dir district has 149,536 households and a population of 1,083,566. The district has a sex ratio of 98.36 males to 100 females and a literacy rate of 46.77%: 62.76% for males and 31.67% for females. 392,214 (36.24% of the surveyed population) are under 10 years of age. 47,842 (4.42%) live in urban areas.

=== Language ===
Languages of Upper Dir district (2023)
1. Pashto (91.0%)
2. Kohistani (5.11%)
3. Hindko (0.51%)
4. Urdu (0.38%)
5. Others (mainly Gujari) (2.98%)

Pashto is the predominant language, spoken by 91.02% of the population. Kohistani languages are spoken by 5.11% of the population, and 3.87% of the population speak 'Other' languages. Other minority spoken languages are Gujari, Kohistani, Hindko and Urdu. As per 2023 estimates by Tablue Public in Upper Dir District Gujari along with Kohistani is spoken by 4.92% of the population. Hindko is spoken by 0.51% and Urdu is spoken by 0.38%.

=== Religion ===
According to 2023 census of Pakistan, 2,415 (0.22%) of the people in the district are from religious minorities, mainly Christians.

== Administration ==
Upper Dir District has four Tehsils.

Tehsil	Area (km^{2})	Pop. (2023)	Density (ppl/km^{2}) (2023)	Literacy rate (2023)	Union Councils
Barawal Tehsil	...	...	...	...	
Dir Tehsil	1,012	384,667	380.11	48.26%	
Kalkot Tehsil	...	...	...	...	
Sharingal Tehsil	1,140	210,356	184.52	37.15%	

=== National Assembly ===
This district is represented by one elected MNA (Member of National Assembly) in Pakistan National Assembly. Its constituency is NA-5 (Upper Dir).

Member of National Assembly	Party affiliation	Year
Molana Asad Ullah	Muttahida Majlis-e-Amal	2002
Najum-din Khan	Pakistan Peoples Party	2008
Sahibzada Sebgat Ullah	Pakistan Tehreek-e-Insaf	2018
Jamil Haider	PML-N	2013

=== Provincial Assembly ===
In the provincial assembly of Khyber Pakhtunkhwa, there are three seats for the Upper Dir district. Its constituency is PK-11, PK-12 and PK-13.

Member of Provincial Assembly	Party affiliation	Constituency	Year
Gul Ibrahim Khan	Pakistan Tehreek-e-Insaf	PK-11 Upper Dir -I	2024
Muhammad Yamin	Pakistan Tehreek-e-Insaf	PK-12 Upper Dir -II	2024
Muhammad Anwar Khan	Pakistan Tehreek-e-Insaf	PK-13 Upper Dir -III	2024

== Towns ==
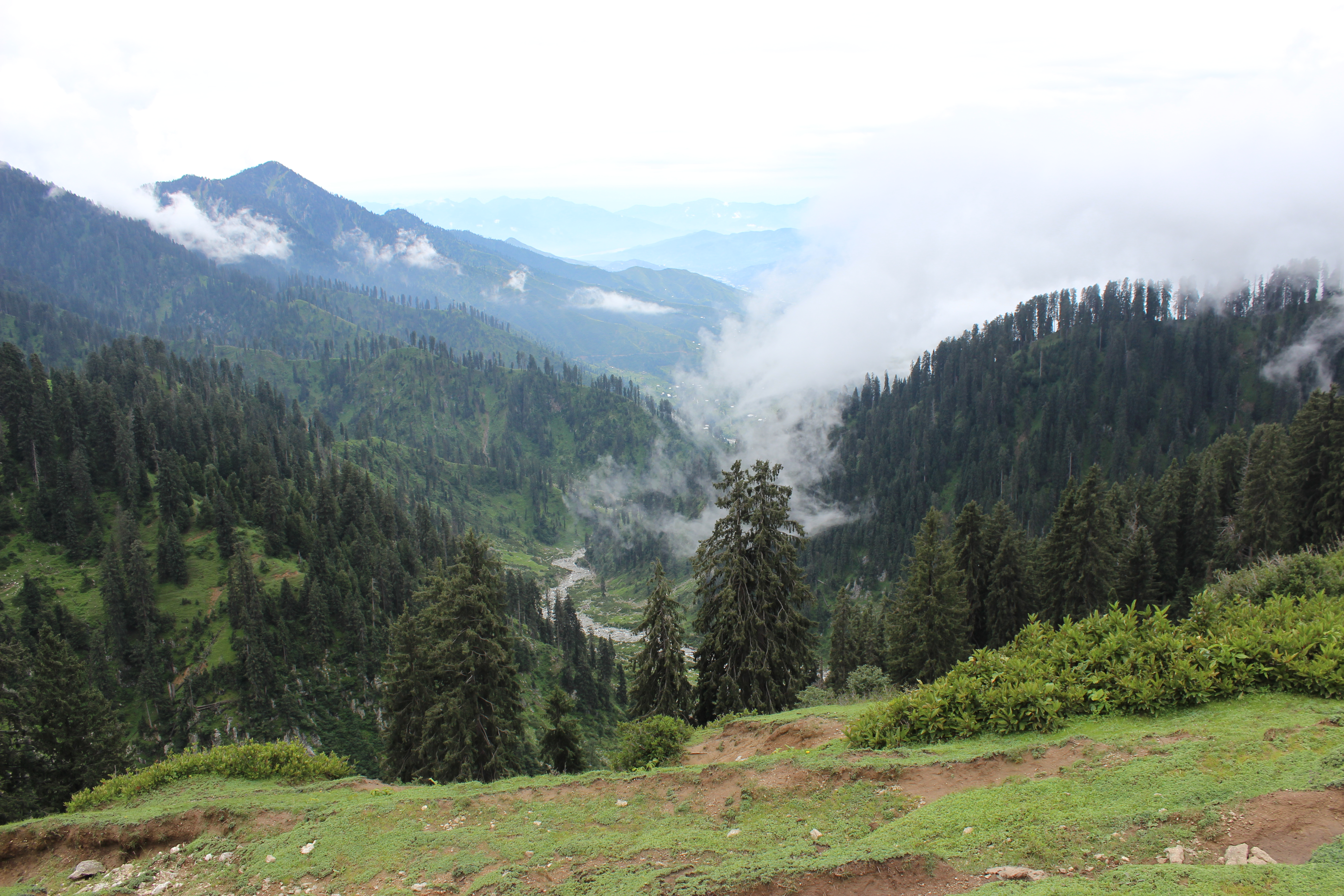

Except for the town of Dir and a number of rapidly growing towns along the main road, the population is rural. The population of Dur is scattered across more than 1,200 villages in the deep narrow valleys of the Panjkora and its tributaries.

Of these, notable villages include:

- Khas Dir
- Panakot
- Roghano Darra-Jelar
- Usheri
- Sundrawal
- Hattan
- Barawal Bandai
- Qashqaray
- Qulandai
- Benr
- Nusrat
- Ben Shahi
- Sunai
- Surbat
- Kair
- Pataw (Patao)
- Kalkot
- Patrak
- Sheringal
- Doog Dara
- Barawal
- Chumra
- Gandigar
- Katan
- Doryal
- Toormang
- Darorra
- Ganori
- Shalkani
- Wari
- Kakad
- Chaper
- Chukiatan

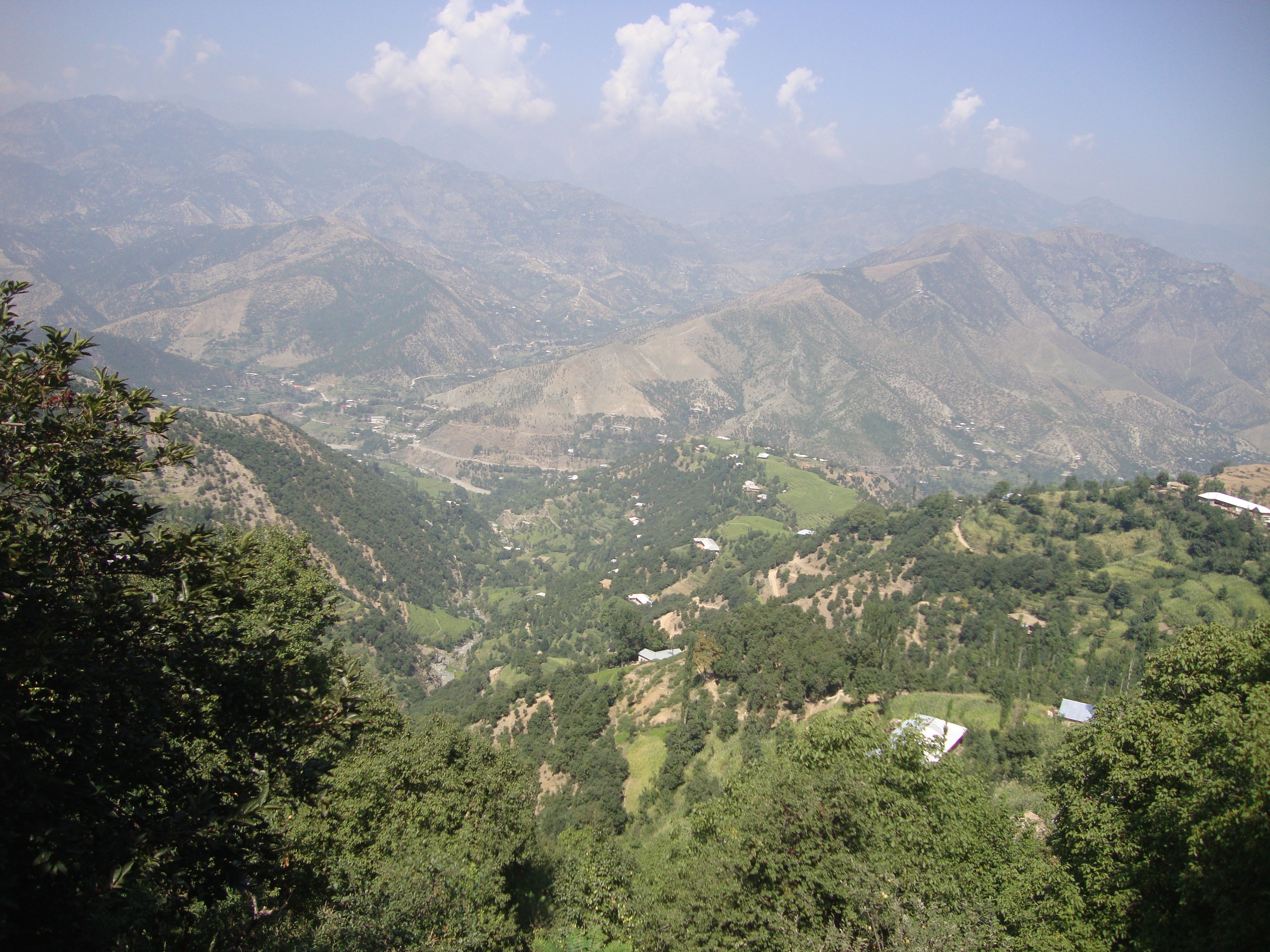

=== Popular places ===
Other popular places:

- Qashqaray
- Panakot
- Kumrat Valley
- Kalkot
- Sheringal
- Bibyawar, Malakabad
- Doog Dara
- Ushirai Dara
- Shahi Koto
- Doryal kozkaly
- Nehag Dara
- Barawal
- Ganori
- Gandigar
- Nowra
- Lowari Top
- Seratai
- sawni
- Doryall
- Guli Bagh Karo
- Khaposai Karo
- kakad
- Roghano Darra
- Wari City

. Kadekhel Darra (Jogha,Malanga,Bagh etc,)

== Notable people ==
- Dr Zia Ul Haq (born 1980), university Vice Chancellor
- Inayatullah Khan, JI provincial president and former Senior minister of Khyber Pakhtunkhwa.

== See also ==
- Dir (city)
- Dir (princely state)
- Lower Dir District
- Chitral District
- Swat District
- Districts of Pakistan
  - Districts of Khyber Pakhtunkhwa
  - Districts of Punjab, Pakistan
  - Districts of Balochistan, Pakistan
  - Districts of Sindh, Pakistan
  - Districts of Azad Kashmir
  - Districts of Gilgit-Baltistan
- Divisions of Pakistan
  - Divisions of Balochistan
  - Divisions of Khyber Pakhtunkhwa
  - Divisions of Punjab, Pakistan
  - Divisions of Sindh
  - Divisions of Azad Kashmir
  - Divisions of Gilgit-Baltistan
