= Matta Tehsil =

Matta مټه
- Tehsil
- Location within Khyber Pakhtunkhwa Location within Pakistan
- Coordinates: 34.9266674°N 72.4075101°E
- Country: Pakistan
- Province: Khyber Pakhtunkhwa
- District: Upper Swat

Government
  - Nazim: Abdullah Khan (PTI)

Population (2017)
  - Tehsil: 465,996
  - Urban: 42,647
  - Rural: 423,349
- Time zone: UTC+5 (PST)
- Number of towns: 1 (Major)
- Number of Union Councils: 65
- Website: www.zamaswat.com www.visitswat.com

Matta (Pashto: مټه) is an administrative subdivision (Tehsil) of Upper Swat District in the Khyber Pakhtunkhwa province of Pakistan.

According to Khyber Pakhtunkhwa Local Government Act 2013, Tehsil Matta has the following 13 Wards:

1. Pir Kalay
2. Arkot
3. Tiower
4. Bar Tharna
5. Gwalarai
6. Biha
7. Chuprial
8. Matta Khararai
9. Baidara
10. Durushkhela
11. Asharai
12. Darmai
13. Sakhra
14. Sherpalum (Tigerplace)

== Bakoor ==
- Matta, Swat
