= Bahrain (union council) =

Pakistani administrative unit

- Union Council
- قلعہ کلے
- Country: Pakistan
- Province: Khyber Pakhtunkhwa
- District: Swat

Population (2017)
  - Total: 102,253
- Time zone: UTC+5 (PST)

Bahrain (Urdu: قلعہ کلے) is an administrative unit, known as union council, of Swat District in the Khyber Pakhtunkhwa province of Pakistan. District Swat has seven Tehsils—Khwazakhela, Kabal, Bahrain, Barikot, Babuzai, Charbagh, and Matta. Each Tehsill comprises certain numbers of union councils. There are 65 union councils in district Swat, 56 rural and nine urban.

== See also ==
- Swat District
