= Kota, Swat =

Kota
- Union council
- Country: Pakistan
- Province: Khyber Pakhtunkhwa
- District: Swat

Government
  - Engineer: Islam

Population (2017)
  - Total: 27,700
- Time zone: UTC+5 (PST)

Kota (Pashto: کوټه) is a union council of Swat District in the Khyber Pakhtunkhwa province of Pakistan.

Swat District has eight tehsils: Behrain, Matta, Kabal, Barikot, Khwazakhela, Babuzai, and Charbagh. Each tehsil comprises certain numbers of union councils. There are 65 union councils in Swat District, 56 rural and nine urban.

== Villages ==
- Aboha
