= E90 expressway (Pakistan) =

Road in Pakistan

E–90 Expressway
- Besham–Khwazakhela Expressway بشام–خوازه خیله بزرگراه

Route information
- Maintained by National Highway Authority
- Length: 66 km (41 mi)

Major junctions
- East end: Besham
- West end: Khwazakhela

Location
- Country: Pakistan
- Major cities: Karora, Alpuri

Highway system
- Roads in Pakistan

The E90 Expressway or Besham–Khwazakhela Expressway (Pashto/Urdu: بشام–خوازه خیله بزرگراه) is a proposed controlled-access expressway which will link the eastern town of Besham, Shangla District on the N-35 with the western town of Khwazakhela, Swat District on the N-90 in Khyber Pakhtunkhwa, Pakistan. This is not to be confused with the Swat Expressway, which is a provincial road project being constructed by the Pakhtunkhwa Highways Authority.

== See also ==
- Expressways of Pakistan
