= Aboha =

City in Swat,Pakistan

Coordinates: 34°40′N 72°11′E

Aboha Is a village in the Union Council of Kota Swat, Tehsil Barikot in Swat District, Khayber Pukhtoonkhwa. It is located on the gateway to main city of Swat on the main G.T road.

== Heritage Sites ==
There are several UNESCO world heritage sites near the village. The closest heritage site in Pakistan is Buddhist Ruins of Takht-i-Bahi and neighbouring city Remains at Sahr-i-Bahlol at a distance of 27 mi (or 44 km), South-West of the village.
