= Charbagh, Swat =

Charbagh
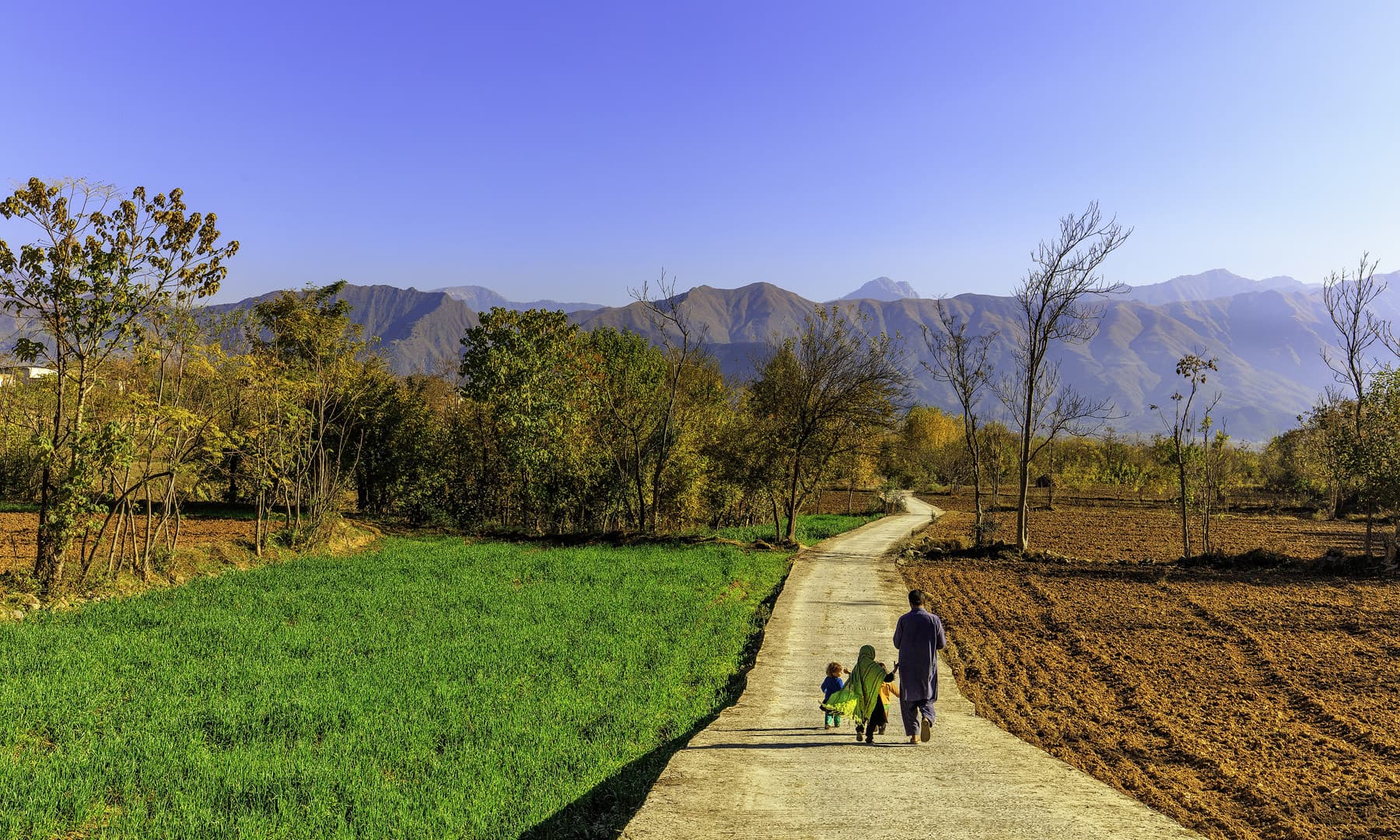

- Location within Pakistan
- Coordinates: 34.50°N 72.26°E
- Country: Pakistan
- Province: Khyber Pakhtunkhwa
- Elevation: 980 m (3,220 ft)

Population (2017)
  - Total: 39,605
- Time zone: UTC+5 (PST)

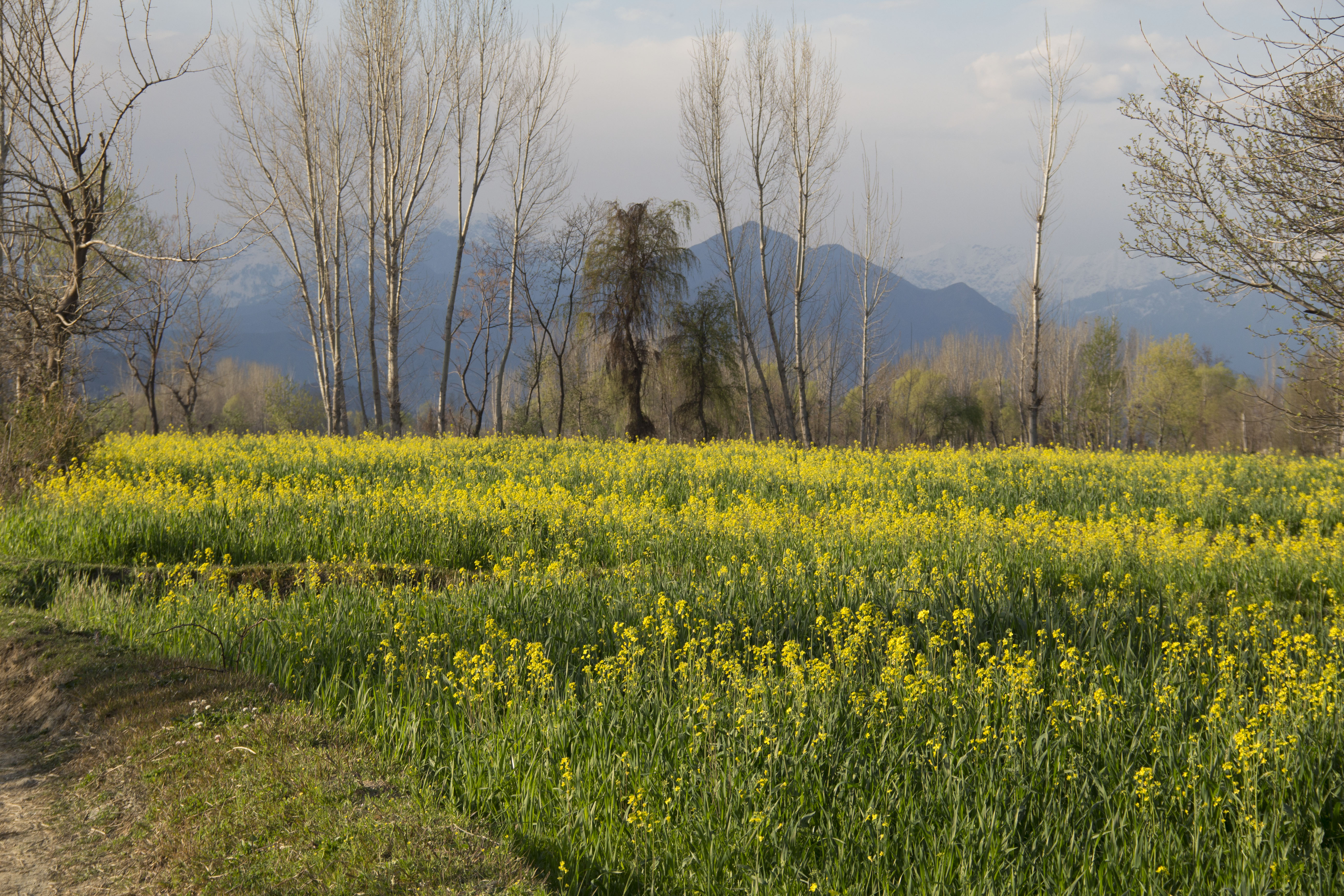

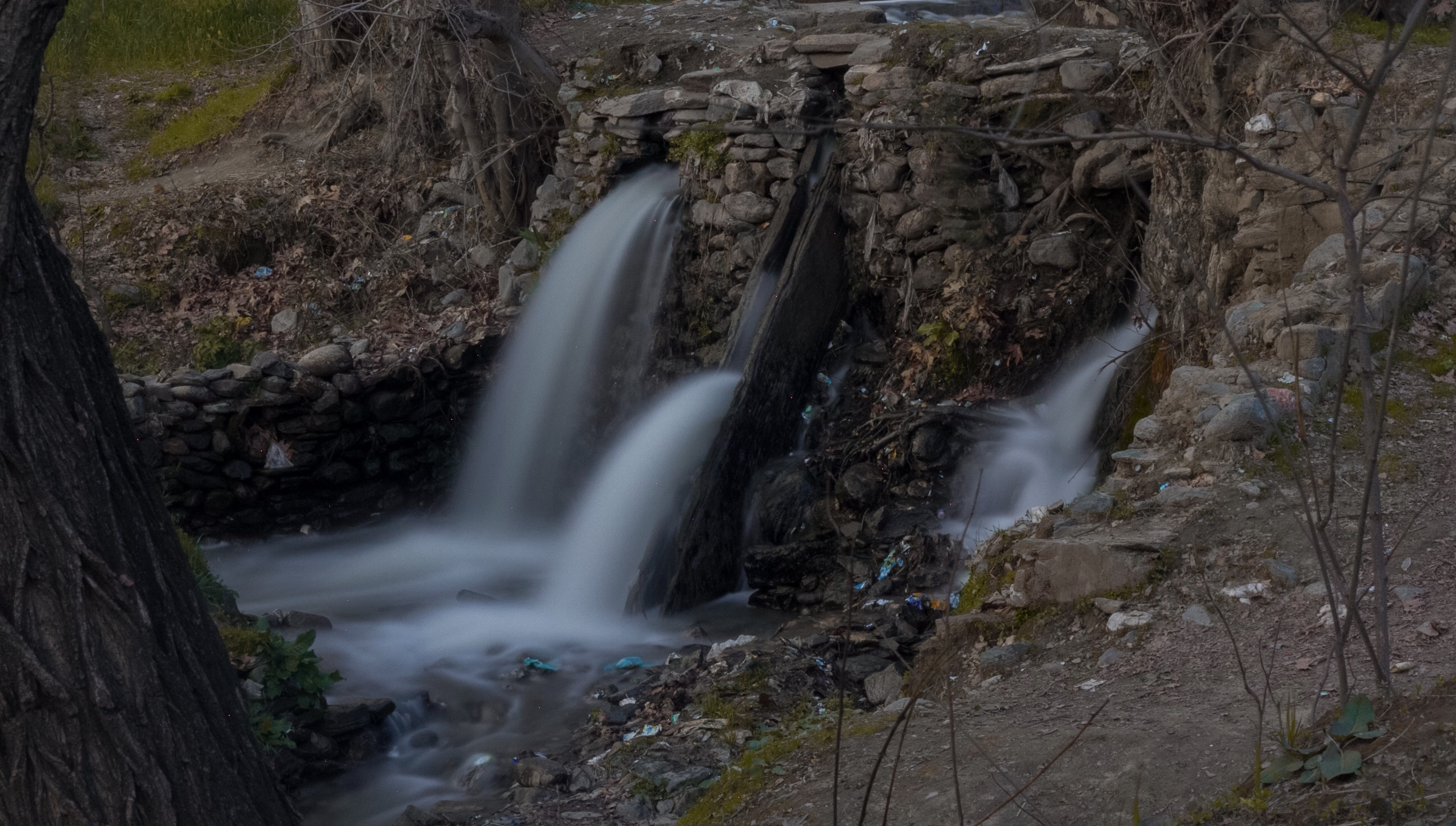
An old Water Flour Mill in Charbagh, Swat

Charbagh (Pashto: چارباغ) is a town in Charbagh Tehsil, Swat District in the Khyber Pakhtunkhwa province of Pakistan. It is located at 34°50'0"N 72°26'30"E with an average altitude of 1,032 meters (3,386 feet). It is located on the N-95 National Highway some 15 km from Mingora in Khyber Pakhtunkhwa.

== Population ==
The population of Charbagh is 39,605.

== See also ==
Other towns in Charbagh Tehsil:

- Taligram (Pashto: تليګرام)
- Gulibagh (Pashto: ګلي باغ)
