= Jarogo Waterfall =

Waterfall in Swat Valley, Pakistan

- د جاروګو ځړوبى
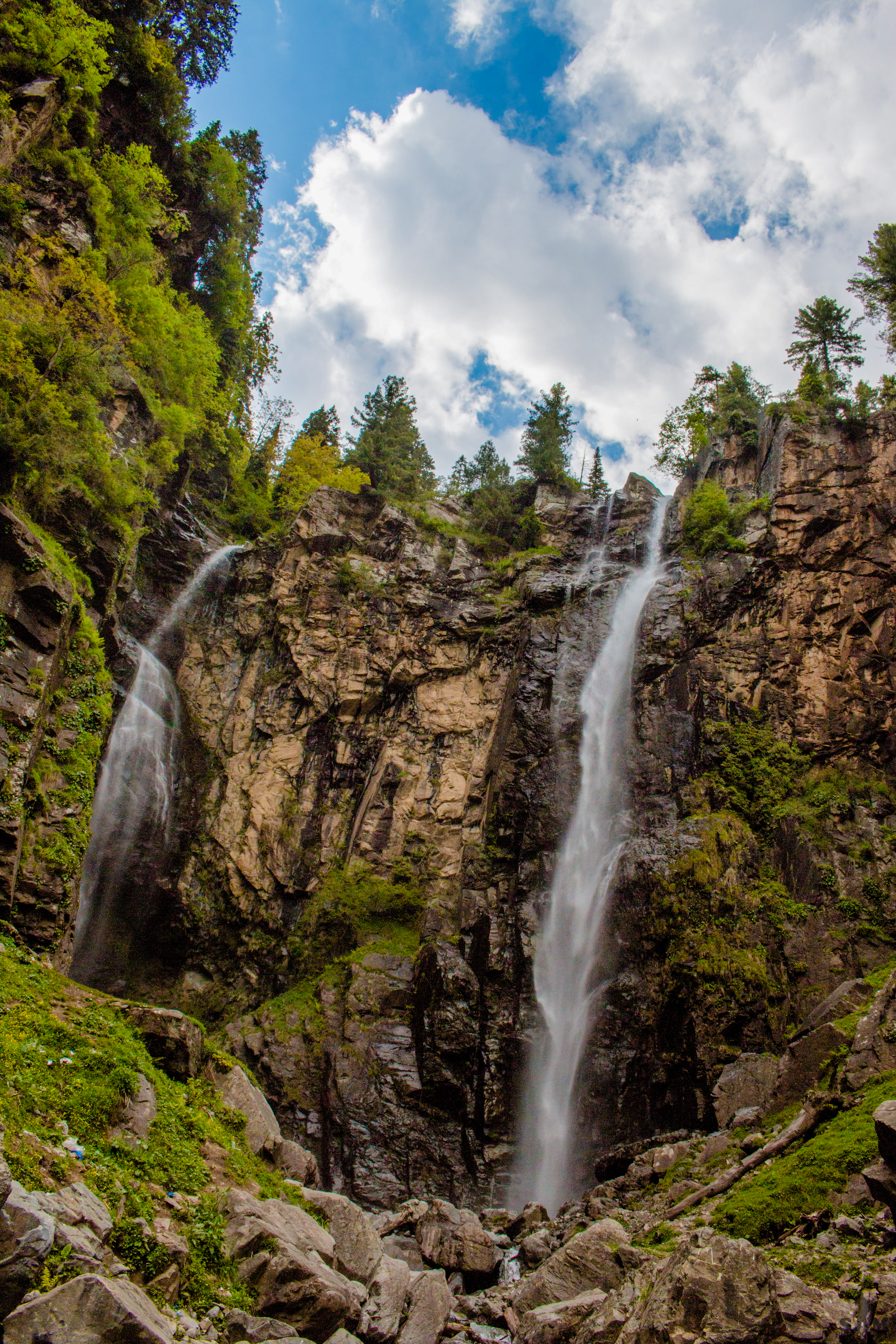
- Jarogo Waterfall, Swat
- Interactive map of Jarogo Waterfall
- Location: Matta Tehsil, Upper Swat, Khyber Pakhtunkhwa, Pakistan
- Coordinates: 35.102263°N 72.213277°E
- Total height: 400 ft (120 m)

Jarogo Waterfall (Pashto: د جاروګو آبشار , د جاروګو ځړوبى, romanized: Da Jārūgō Dzaɽōbay or Da Jārūgō Jaɽōbay, lit. 'The Brooms Waterfall'), also known as Jarogo Banda Waterfall, is a waterfall located in Matta Tehsil in Upper Swat District of Khyber Pakhtunkhwa province of Pakistan. It is one of the well-known waterfalls in Swat Valley. It is situated at a distance of around 55 kilometres (34 mi) from Mingora city. The waterfall can be accessed from Matta via the 30 kilometres (19 mi) long route through Fazal Banda Road.

It is sometimes referred to as the duplicate of Gabin Jabba's waterfall due to similarities between the two. Lying in the Hindu Kush mountain range, the waterfall is surrounded by pine trees and thick forests. In 2022, when the federal government of Pakistan allotted 19 motels of Pakistan Tourism Development Corporation (PTDC) to the Khyber Pakhtunkhwa Tourism Authority in order to promote tourism in the province, Jarogo Waterfall, being part of Integrated Tourism Zones (ITZ), was included in one of the three projects. As a result, camping pods were then built nearby the waterfall.

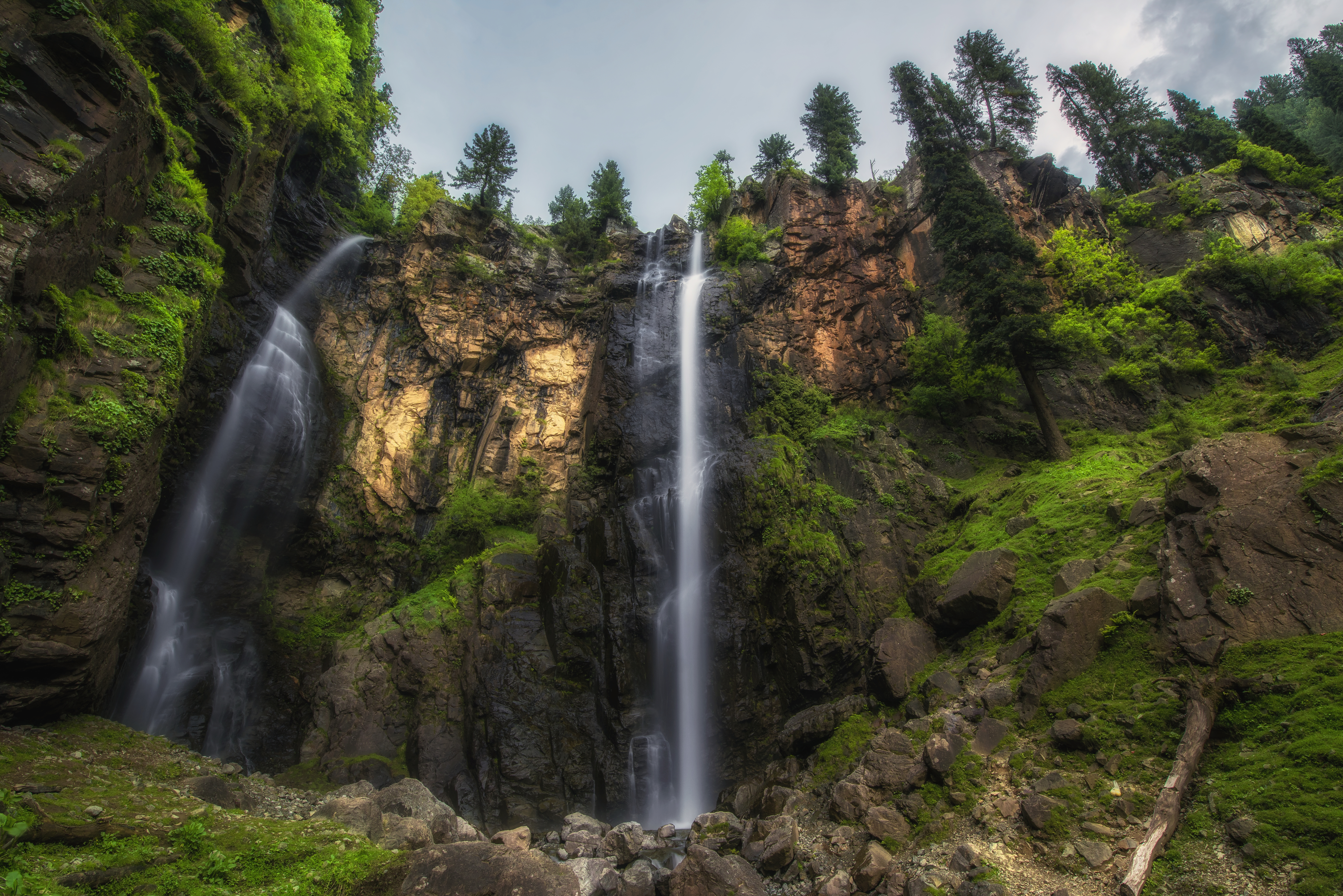
An aerial view of the waterfall photographed in c. 2017.

== Etymology ==
The name originates from the local Swat dialect of Pashto and is an inflected variant of the root word جاروګۍ (jārogəi), meaning "broom." According to local folklore, the name is tied either to a prominent Hindu Shahi woman named Jarogai who once resided in the area, or to the historical practice of village women gathering wild straws from the surrounding forests to craft traditional brooms.

== See also ==
- Shingrai Waterfall
- List of waterfalls
- List of waterfalls of Pakistan
