= Bahrain (disambiguation) =

Bahrain is an island country in West Asia.

Bahrain may also refer to:

- Bahrain Island, the main island of Bahrain
- Bahrain (historical region) or Eastern Arabia, a historic region in the Middle East
- Bahrain, Iran or Dorud, a city in Iran
- Bahrain, Swat, a town in Pakistan
- Bahrain (union council), an administrative unit in the Swat district, Pakistan
