= M-16 motorway (Pakistan) =

Motorway in Pakistan

M-16 motorway
- ایم ١٦ موٹروے
- Swat Motorway سوات موٹروے

Route information
- Maintained by National Highway Authority
- Length: 160 km (99 mi)

Major junctions
- North end: Fatehpur, Swat
- South end: Nowshera

Location
- Country: Pakistan

Highway system
- Roads in Pakistan

The M-16 Motorway or the Nowshera–Fatehpur, also known the Swat Motorway, (Note: Pashto: د سوات سترلاره, romanized: də swāt stərlāra, Urdu: سوات موٹر وے) is a 160-kilometre-long (99 mi) four-lane motorway in Khyber Pakhtunkhwa, Pakistan.

Phase-1 of the project, completed in June 2019, connects the existing M-1 motorway at Nowshera to Chakdara.

Phase-2 is under-construction second phase will extend the project from Chakdara to Fatehpur.

== History ==
The phase-1 of motorway stretches from Nowshera to Chakdara in Lower Dir District, passing through Swabi, Mardan, Malakand and Swat. The phase-1 of the project was inaugurated in August 2016. and opened for traffic on 3 June 2019 The phase-1 reduced the travel time from Nowshera to Chakdara from three hours to one hour. The Swat motorway phase-1 was constructed by the Frontier Works Organization at a cost of Rs. 36 billion (US$130 million). The Asian Development Bank and China provided the principal technical and financial assistance for the project, while Saudi Arabia pledged Rs. 3.4 billion (US$12 million).

Phase two of the motorway will extend another 79 kilometers to the north and terminate at Fatehpur. It will pass through Chakdara, Shamozai, Barikot, Mingora, Kanju, Malam Jabba, Sher Palam, Matta Khwazakhela, and ends at Madayan-Fatehpur Interchange. On 16 July 2020, ECNEC approved land acquisition for Swat Motorway Phase-II at a cost of Rs. 20 bn. The Khyber Pakhtunkhwa government allocated Rs. 70 bn. for the extension The Swat motorway or M-16 should not be confused with the E90 Expressway (Besham–Khwazakhela Expressway) proposed by the National Highway Authority, which also terminates in Swat.

== Swat Phase-II extension ==
Swat Motorway phase-II will be completed under a public-private partnership. The length of the motorway will be 80-kilometer. It will connect Thana Baizai to Fatehpur. The cost of the project is Rs. 37 billion with an additional Rs. 20.5 billion for the purchase of land. It will have nine interchanges and eight bridges. The motorway would have four lanes with the future possibility of extending it to six lanes.

On 11 March 2021, a summary was presented before ECNEC regarding 10,000 kanal land acquisition for Swat Motorway phase-II to be sponsored by the Government of Khyber Pakhtunkhwa and executed by Pakhtunkhwa Highway Authority (PKHA) (through Federal PSDP) equal to RS.20,000 million for construction of about 80 km 04-lane motorway from Chakdara to Fatehpur.

The Committee approved the said project and strongly recommended to complete such projects on Public Private Partnership (PPP) basis.

ECNEC approves 4-lane Sambrial-Kharian Motorway

== See also ==
- Motorways of Pakistan
- Provincial Highways of Khyber Pakhtunkhwa
- E90 Expressway
- Malam Jabba ski resort
- Tourism in Pakistan
- Peshawar–D.I. Khan motorway
