= Barikot Tehsil =

Township in Khyber Pakhtunkhwa, Pakistan

Barikot Tehsil تحصیل بریکوٹ بریکوټ تحصیل
- Tehsil
- Location within Khyber Pakhtunkhwa Location within Pakistan
- Coordinates: 34°40′40″N 72°13′24″E
- Country: Pakistan
- Province: Khyber Pakhtunkhwa
- District: Swat

Government
  - Tehsil Chairman: Kashif Ali (Pakistan Tehreek Insaf)

Population (2023)
  - Tehsil: 220,148
  - Urban: 115,045
  - Rural: 105,103
- Time zone: UTC+5 (PST)

Barikot is an administrative subdivision (tehsil) of Swat District in the Khyber Pakhtunkhwa province of Pakistan.

Swat District has seven tehsils i.e. Tehsil Barikot, Tehsil Babuzai, Tehsil Matta, Tehsil Khwazakhela, Tehsil Kabal, Tehsil Charbagh and Tehsil Bahrain. Each Tehsil comprises certain numbers of Union council. There are 65 Union council in district Swat (56 rural and 09 urban).

According to Khyber Pakhtunkhwa Local Government Act 2013, Tehsil Barikot has the following 5 Wards:

1. Ghalegay
2. Barikot
3. Tindodag
4. Panjigram
5. Najigram
6. Nawagai
7. Amlok Dara
8. Karakar
9. Kandak Jehangir
10. Parrai
11. Kota
12. Shamozai
13. Guratai
14. Manyar
15. Landakay
16. New kalai
17. Shingardar
18. Nagoha
19. Dedawar
20. zarakhela
21. Chungi

== See also ==
- Swat District
