= Charbagh Tehsil =

Charbagh Tehsil تحصیل چارباغ چارباغ تحصیل
- Tehsil
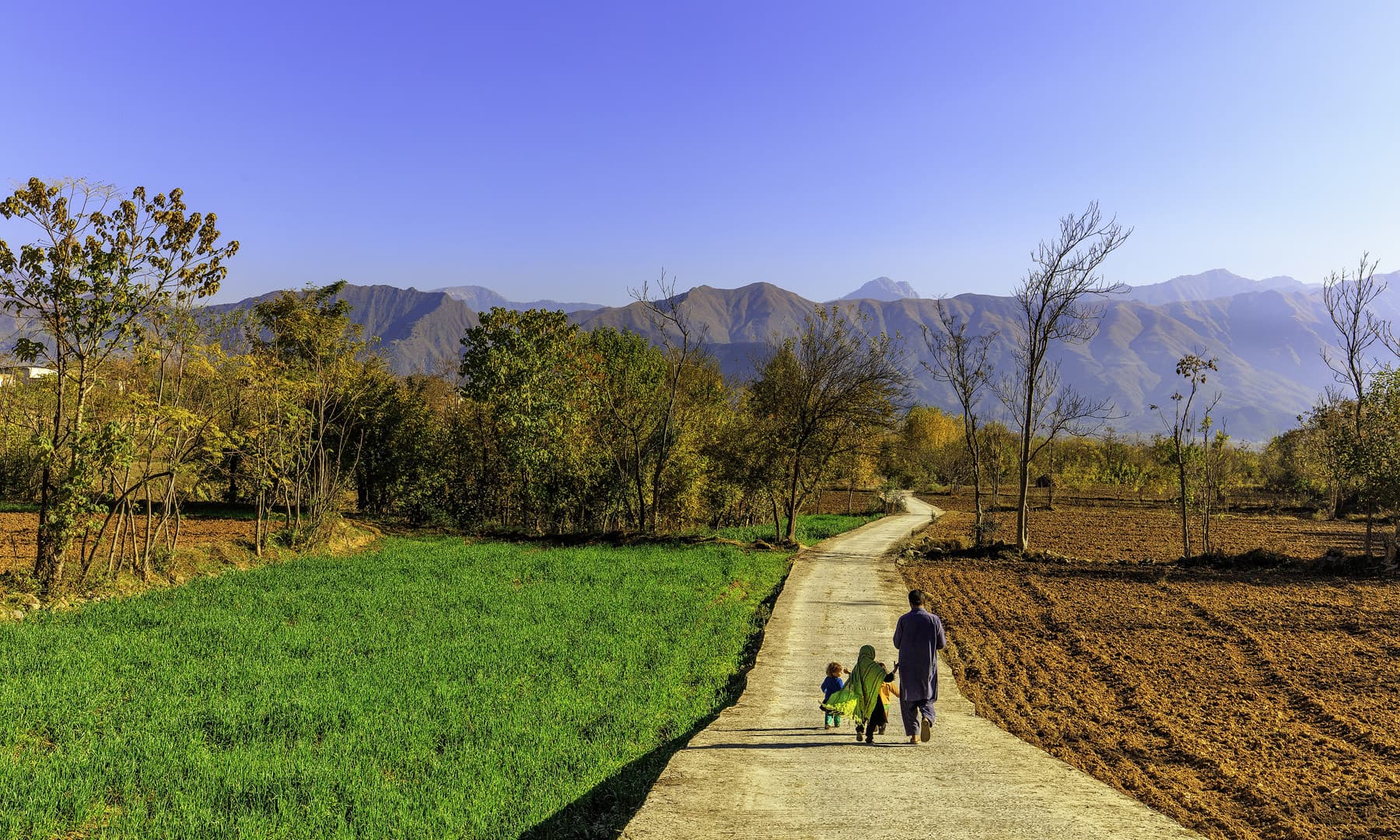
- Country: Pakistan
- Province: Khyber Pakhtunkhwa
- District: Swat

Government
  - Tehsil Chairman: Ihsan Ullah Khan (JUI(F))

Population (2017)
  - Total: 126,115
- Time zone: UTC+5 (PST)

Charbagh is a tehsil of Swat District in the Khyber Pakhtunkhwa province of Pakistan.

Swat District has seven tehsils: Charbagh, Babuzai, Matta, Khwaza Khela, Barikot, Kabal and Behrain. Each tehsil comprises certain numbers of union councils. There are 65 union councils in Swat District, 56 rural and nine urban.

According to Khyber Pakhtunkhwa Local Government Act 2013, Tehsil Charbagh has the following five wards:

- Charbagh I
- Charbagh II
- Gulibagh
- Taligram
- Kishawara

== Education ==
The University of Swat is located in this tehsil.

== Population ==
According to the 2017 census, the population of tehsil Charbagh is 126,115. Charbagh tehsil has a population density of 934.9/km^{2}.
