= N-95 National Highway =

Road in Pakistan

National Highway 95
- قومی شاہراہ ٩٥
- Chakdara-Kalam Highway

Route information
- Maintained by NHA
- Length: 135 km (84 mi)

Major junctions
- North end: Kalam
- South end: Chakdara

Location
- Country: Pakistan

Highway system
- Roads in Pakistan

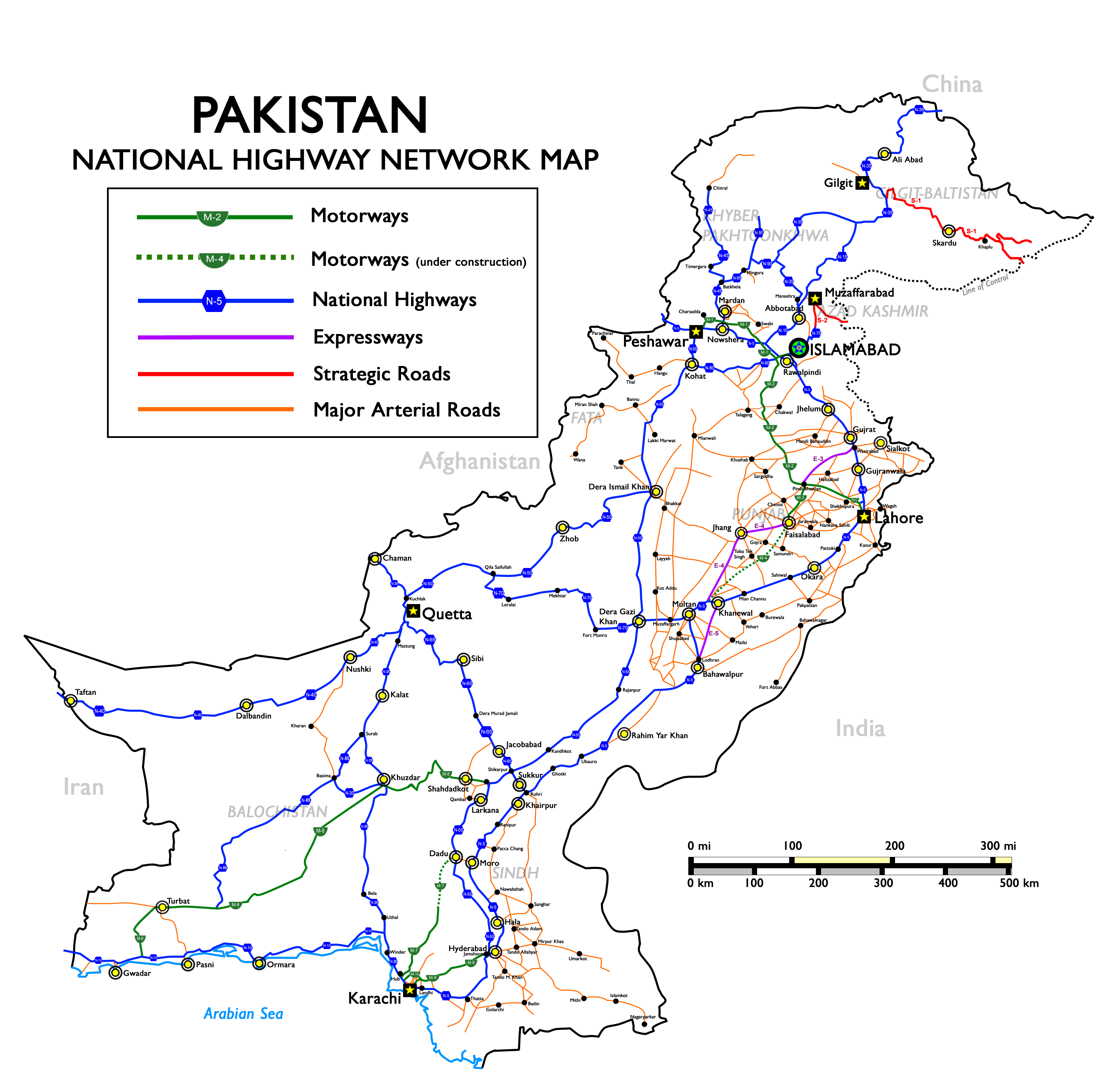
Map of National Highways of Pakistan also indicating N-95

The National Highway 95 (Urdu: قومی شاہراہ ۹۵), also known as the N-95 or the Chakdara-Kalam Highway, is one of the National Highways of Pakistan, running from the town of Chakdara in Lower Dir District to the town of Kalam in Swat District via Mingora, Manglawar, Charbagh, Khwazakhela, Madyan, and Bahrain in the Khyber Pakhtunkhwa province of Pakistan.

Its total length is 135 km, and it is maintained and operated by the National Highway Authority.
