= Besham =

Coordinates: 34°56′15″N 72°52′45″E

- City
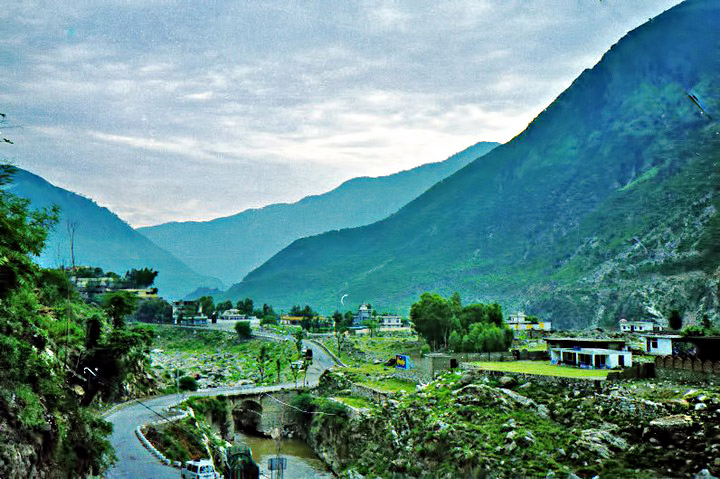
- Besham, Pakistan
- Interactive map of Besham
- Country: Pakistan
- Province: Khyber Pakhtunkhwa
- District: Shangla
- Elevation: 613 m (2,011 ft)
- Time zone: UTC+5 (PST)

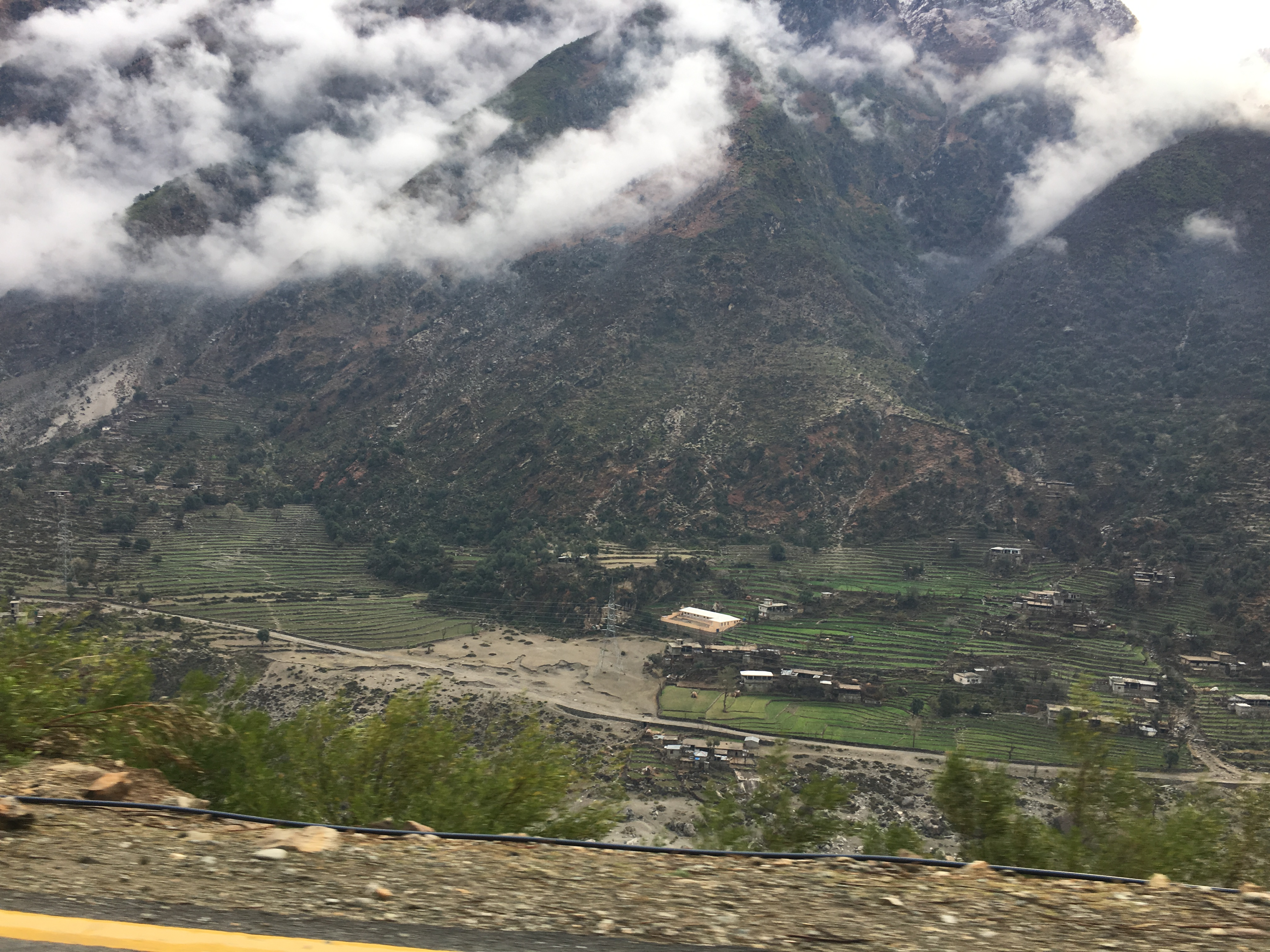
Besham is a city to stay for tourist who want to head to Hunza or Gilgit.

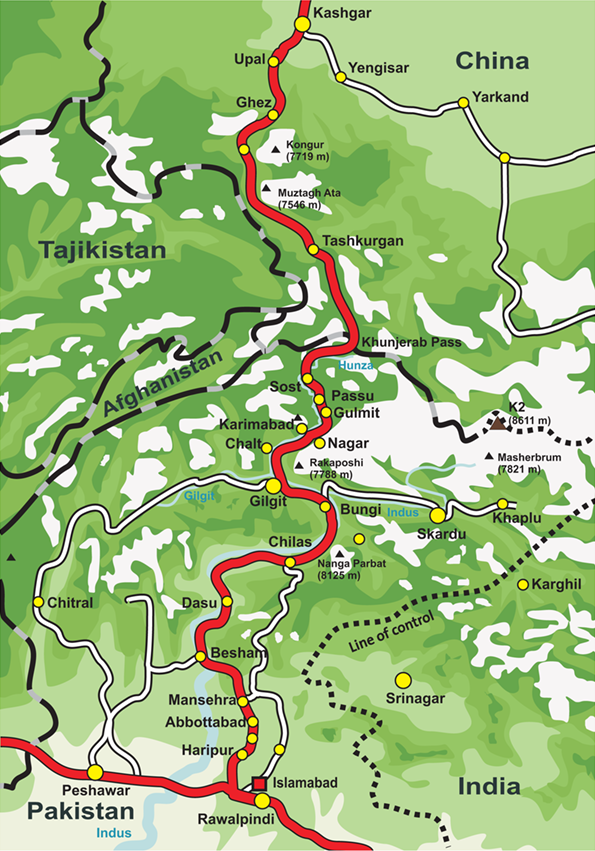
Map of the Karakorum Highway

Besham (Urdu, Pashto: بشام; also known as Besham Qila) is a city in the Shangla District of Khyber Pakhtunkhwa, Pakistan. Located on the right bank of the Indus River (locally known as Abasin), Besham serves as a major junction on the Karakoram Highway, that connects Khyber Pakhtunkhwa and Punjab with Gilgit-Baltistan, and crosses over into China's Xinjiang. Besham is also the eastern terminus of the under-construction E90 expressway, which will connect the city westward with Khwazakhela in Swat District. Besham is located around 60 kilometres (40 mi) east of Swat, 250 kilometres (160 mi) north of Rawalpindi-Islamabad, and 270 kilometres (170 mi) northeast of the provincial capital, Peshawar.

Historically, the place has been home to many Buddhist hermit as well as ancient historical sites. Besham was previously a part of the State of Swat and then Swat District, until the creation of Shangla District on 10 July 1995.

== Tourism ==
Tourists pass through Besham if they are taking Karakoram Highway route for Hunza and Gilgit, as the alternative route through the Kaghan Valley is often blocked due to heavy snowfall. A rest house, located on the bank of the Indus River, is provided by the Pakistan Tourism Development Corporation.

== Climate ==
With a mild and generally warm and temperate climate, Besham features a humid subtropical climate (Cfa) under the Köppen climate classification. The average temperature in Besham is 20.7 °C, while the annual precipitation averages 842 mm. Even in the driest months, there is a lot of precipitation. November is the driest month with 18 mm of precipitation, while August, the wettest month, has an average precipitation of 138 mm.

June is the hottest month of the year with an average temperature of 30.6 °C. The coldest month January has an average temperature of 8.9 °C.

Climate data for Besham
Month	Jan	Feb	Mar	Apr	May	Jun	Jul	Aug	Sep	Oct	Nov	Dec	Year
Mean daily maximum °C (°F)	14.9 (58.8)	17.5 (63.5)	22.5 (72.5)	27.6 (81.7)	33.3 (91.9)	38.4 (101.1)	36.9 (98.4)	35.2 (95.4)	33.8 (92.8)	29.6 (85.3)	23.6 (74.5)	17.2 (63.0)	27.5 (81.6)
Daily mean °C (°F)	8.9 (48.0)	11.5 (52.7)	16.0 (60.8)	20.8 (69.4)	25.9 (78.6)	30.6 (87.1)	30.4 (86.7)	29.1 (84.4)	26.8 (80.2)	21.6 (70.9)	15.8 (60.4)	10.7 (51.3)	20.7 (69.2)
Mean daily minimum °C (°F)	3.0 (37.4)	5.6 (42.1)	9.6 (49.3)	14.1 (57.4)	18.5 (65.3)	22.9 (73.2)	23.9 (75.0)	23.1 (73.6)	19.9 (67.8)	13.7 (56.7)	8.1 (46.6)	4.2 (39.6)	13.9 (57.0)
Source: Climate-Data.org
