= Shin, Swat =

Shin
- Union Council
- Country: Pakistan
- Province: Khyber Pakhtunkhwa
- District: Upper Swat

Population (2017)
  - Total: 32,154
- Time zone: UTC+5 (PST)

Shin is an administrative unit, known as a Union council, of Upper Swat District in the Khyber Pakhtunkhwa province of Pakistan.
