= Khwazakhela =

Khwazakhela خوازہ خیلہ خوازه خېله
- Town
- Location within Khyber Pakhtunkhwa Location within Pakistan
- Coordinates: 34°56′N 72°28′E
- Country: Pakistan
- Province: Khyber Pakhtunkhwa
- District: Upper Swat
- Tehsil: Khwazakhela Tehsil

Government
  - Tehsil Chairman (Former): Aftab Ali Khan (Pakistan Tehreek-e-Insaf)
- Elevation: 1,151 m (3,776 ft)

Population (2023)
  - Total: 57,113
- Time zone: UTC+5 (PST)

Khwazakhela (Urdu: خوازہ خیلہ, Khwazakhela is a town and also a tehsil (administrative area) in Swat District, located in Khyber Pakhtunkhwa, Pakistan. The town includes 16 villages, which are collectively known as Azikhel. Most of the people living there belong to the Yusufzai, Swati, and Gujjar tribes. Khwazakhela is well known for the graves of religious saints (awliya). Some famous saints buried there include Mian Baba, Derai Baba, Chinar Baba, and Byne Baba. Mian Baba and Byne Baba were known as warriors from the Syed family, while Chinar Baba belonged to the Shamakhel family. Geographically, Khwazakhela is located in the central part of Swat. It borders Shangla Valley in the northeast, which is an important trade route. To the north, it is next to Behrain Tehsil, and to the south, it connects with Charbagh Tehsil. On the western side, it lies along the Swat River. The area is surrounded by green mountains on the east, and the land slopes down toward the river in the west. Khwazakhela is the second-largest commercial center in Swat after Mingora. Many people from Kalam, Kohistan, and Shangla come here for shopping and business. One important historical site in the area is the Lwar-e-Jamat Mosque, which was built in the 12th century by Mahmud of Ghazni during his visit. During the Taliban insurgency in Khyber Pakhtunkhwa, this area was less affected compared to other regions.

== Demographics ==
=== Population ===
Historical population
Year	Pop.	±% p.a.
1951	...	—
1961	...	—
1972	...	—
1981	...	—
1998	...	—
2017	48,027	—
2023	57,113	+2.93%

As of the 2023 census, Khwazakhela had a population of 57,113.

== Climate ==
With a mild and generally warm and temperate climate, Khwazakhela features a humid subtropical climate (Cfa) under the Köppen climate classification. The average temperature in Khwazakhela is 18.1 °C, while the annual precipitation averages 969 mm. Even in the driest months, there is a lot of precipitation. November is the driest month with 24 mm of precipitation, while July, the wettest month, has an average precipitation of 138 mm.

July is the warmest month of the year with an average temperature of 28.1 °C. The coldest month January has an average temperature of 6.4 °C.

Climate data for Khwazakhela
Month	Jan	Feb	Mar	Apr	May	Jun	Jul	Aug	Sep	Oct	Nov	Dec	Year
Mean daily maximum °C (°F)	11.3 (52.3)	13.7 (56.7)	18.4 (65.1)	23.8 (74.8)	29.7 (85.5)	35.2 (95.4)	34.6 (94.3)	33.0 (91.4)	31.0 (87.8)	26.5 (79.7)	20.5 (68.9)	13.8 (56.8)	24.3 (75.7)
Daily mean °C (°F)	6.4 (43.5)	8.6 (47.5)	12.8 (55.0)	17.7 (63.9)	22.8 (73.0)	27.8 (82.0)	28.1 (82.6)	27.0 (80.6)	24.4 (75.9)	19.3 (66.7)	13.8 (56.8)	8.5 (47.3)	18.1 (64.6)
Mean daily minimum °C (°F)	1.6 (34.9)	3.6 (38.5)	7.2 (45.0)	11.7 (53.1)	16.0 (60.8)	20.5 (68.9)	21.6 (70.9)	21.0 (69.8)	17.8 (64.0)	12.2 (54.0)	7.1 (44.8)	3.2 (37.8)	12.0 (53.5)
Source: Climate-Data.org

== Administrative units ==
According to Khyber Pakhtunkhwa Local Government Act 2013, Tehsil Khwazakhela has following 7 Wards:

1. Khawazakhela
2. Shalpin
3. Shin
4. Kotanai
5. Miandam
6. Fatehpur
7. Jano
