= Bar Abakhel =

Coordinates: 34°57′N 72°22′E

- Union Council
- Interactive map of Bar Abakhel
- Country: Pakistan
- Province: Khyber Pakhtunkhwa
- District: Upper Swat
- Time zone: UTC+5 (PST)

Bar Abakhel is an administrative unit, known as the union council, of Upper Swat District in the Khyber Pakhtunkhwa province of Pakistan.
