= Kotanai =

Coordinates: 34°59′N 72°28′E

- Union Council
- Interactive map of Kotanai
- Country: Pakistan
- Province: Khyber Pakhtunkhwa
- District: Upper Swat

Population (2017)
  - Total: 32,124
- Time zone: UTC+5 (PST)

Kotanai (Urdu: کوٹنئ, Pashto: کوٹنی) is a union council of Upper Swat District in the Khyber Pakhtunkhwa province of Pakistan.
