= Shalpin =

Coordinates: 34°57′N 72°32′E

- Union Council
- Interactive map of Shalpin
- Country: Pakistan
- Province: Khyber Pakhtunkhwa
- District: Upper Swat

Population (2017)
  - Total: 31,626
- Time zone: UTC+5 (PST)

Shalpin is an administrative unit, known as Union council, of Upper Swat District in the Khyber Pakhtunkhwa province of Pakistan.
