= Darmai =

Coordinates: 35°05′N 72°27′E

- Union Council
- Interactive map of Darmai
- Country: Pakistan
- Province: Khyber Pakhtunkhwa
- District: Upper Swat

Population (2017)
  - Total: 25,903
- Time zone: UTC+5 (PST)

Darmai is an administrative unit, known as Union council, of Upper Swat District in the Khyber Pakhtunkhwa province of Pakistan.
