= Durushkhela =

- Union Council
- دروش خیل
- Country: Pakistan
- Province: Khyber Pakhtunkhwa
- District: Upper Swat

Population (2017)
  - Total: 31,732
- Time zone: UTC+5 (PST)

Durushkhela (Urdu: دروش خیل) is a Union council of Upper Swat District in the Khyber Pakhtunkhwa province of Pakistan.
