= Ghalegay =

Coordinates: 34.6979761°N 72.2474453°E

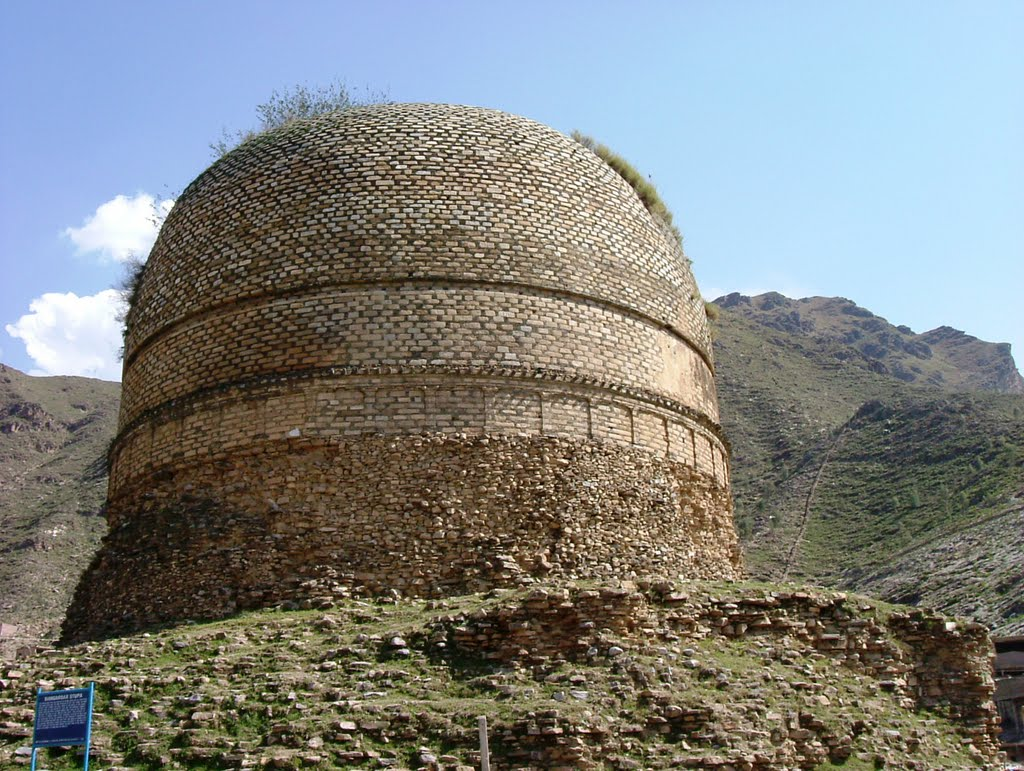
Shingerdar stupa

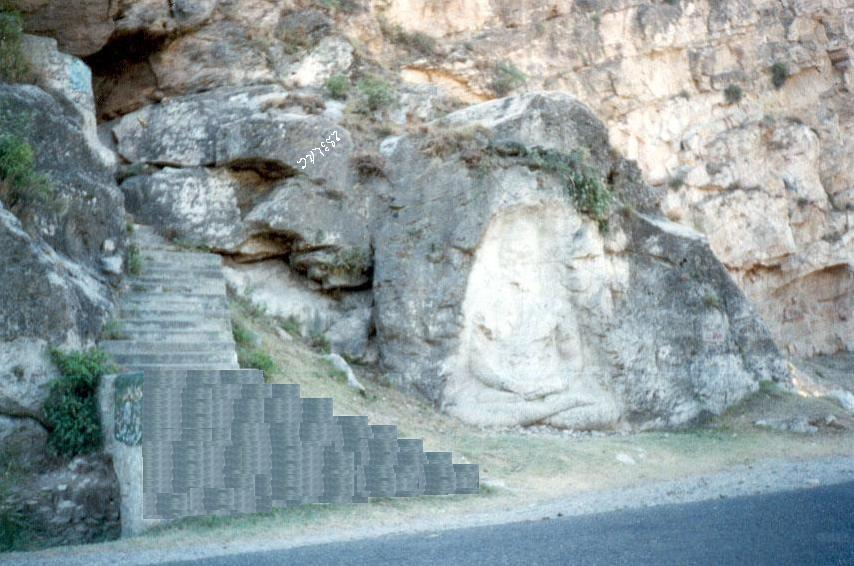
Buddha Statue

Ghalegay (Pashto: غالیګے) is a village of Swat Valley, located at a distance of 14 km south of Mingora, on the left bank of Swat River. It is one of the main villages lying between the two cities, Mingora and Barikot.

During the recent Pashtun era in 1849, when the first legal government was formed, Ghalegay was chosen as the first capital of Swat because of its suitable geographical location. Syed Akbar Shah, who belonged to the family of Pir Baba and was a close friend of Syed Ahmed Shaheed, was nominated as the head of the government. In 1915, when Swat State came into being after a long period of civil war, Miangul Abdul Wadood (also known as Bacha Sahib) was announced as the head of the state. The Jirga of the village crowned him at Ghalagay.

The populace of Ghalegay depends mostly on the agricultural land and River Swat for their living. The village is among the top on educational level, from primary to doctorate. A vast majority of the people are studying and working abroad in Arab countries, Europe and USA. They are now the main source of income for most of the families.

A Human Welfare Association is an active society in the town. The society builds excellent streets and sewage system with the help of World Bank. Vocational training for females are among the widely admired work of the society. The society is currently running a computer course in their computer lab for females of the town.

== Landmarks ==
=== Shingerdar stupa ===
The stupa is located in the village of Shingardar (a village between Ghalegay and Barikot). This stupa is a remnant of Buddhist era, and is one of the thousands ancient monuments in Swat Valley. It was built by Uttarasena, an ancient king of Swat, to enshrine his share of the relics of Buddha. The building of stupa is made of large stones and layers of thin slate. On the way to Mingora there is a statue of Buddha sculptured in a rock on the right side of G.T. road. There are also some remnants in a cave beside this statue.

The Shingardar stupa was identified by Colonel Deane and S.A Stein during the British period.

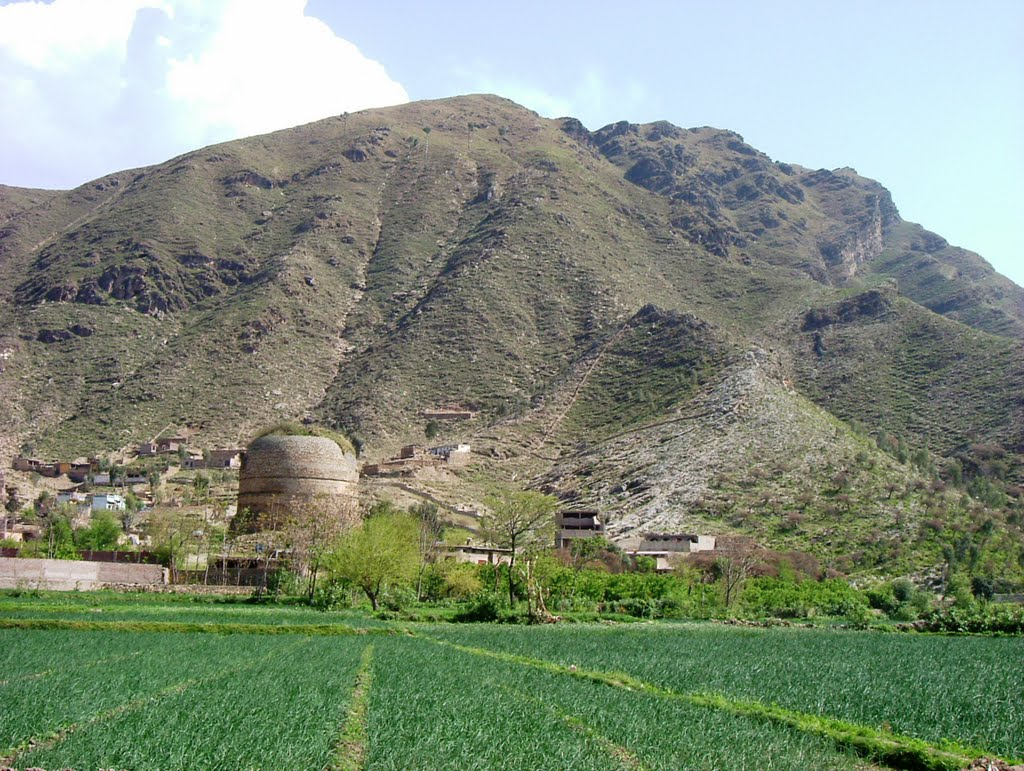
The Shingerdar Stupa stands next to the village.
