= Matta Kharai =

Matta Kharirai
- Union Council
- Country: Pakistan
- Province: Khyber Pakhtunkhwa
- District: Upper Swat

Population (2017)
  - Total: 15,193
- Time zone: UTC+5 (PST)

Matta Kharirai is an administrative unit, known as union council, of Tehsil Matta Upper Swat District in the Khyber Pakhtunkhwa province of Pakistan.
