= Baidara =

- Union Council
- Country: Pakistan
- Province: Khyber Pakhtunkhwa
- District: Upper Swat

Population (2017)
  - Total: 24,142
- Time zone: UTC+5 (PST)

Baidara Swat (Pashto: بېدره) is an administrative unit, known as union council, of Upper Swat District in the Khyber Pakhtunkhwa province of Pakistan. Available on facebook page Baidara swat 50k +Followers
