= Sherpalam =

Pir Kalay
- Union Council
- Country: Pakistan
- Province: Khyber Pakhtunkhwa
- District: Upper Swat

Population (2017)
  - Total: 24,304
- Time zone: UTC+5 (PST)

Pir Kalay is an administrative unit, known as union council, of Upper Swat District in the Khyber Pakhtunkhwa province of Pakistan.
