= Sakhra, Swat =

Coordinates: 35°05′N 72°25′E

Sakhra
- Union Council
- Interactive map of Sakhra
- Country: Pakistan
- Province: Khyber Pakhtunkhwa
- District: Upper Swat

Population (2017)
  - Total: 25,049
- Time zone: UTC+5 (PST)

Sakhra is an administrative unit, known as union council, of Upper Swat District in the Khyber Pakhtunkhwa province of Pakistan.
