= Kishawara =

- Union Council
- Country: Pakistan
- Province: Khyber Pakhtunkhwa
- District: Swat

Population (2017)
  - Total: 17,439
- Time zone: UTC+5 (PST)

Kishawara is an administrative unit, known as Union council, of Swat District in the Khyber Pakhtunkhwa province of Pakistan. District Swat has 7 Tehsils i.e. Khwazakhela, Kabal, Bahrain, Barikot, Babuzai, Charbagh, and Matta. Each Tehsill comprises certain numbers of union councils. There are 65 union councils in district Swat, 56 rural and 09 urban.

== See also ==
- Swat District
