= Matta, Swat =

Matta مټه مٹہ
- Town
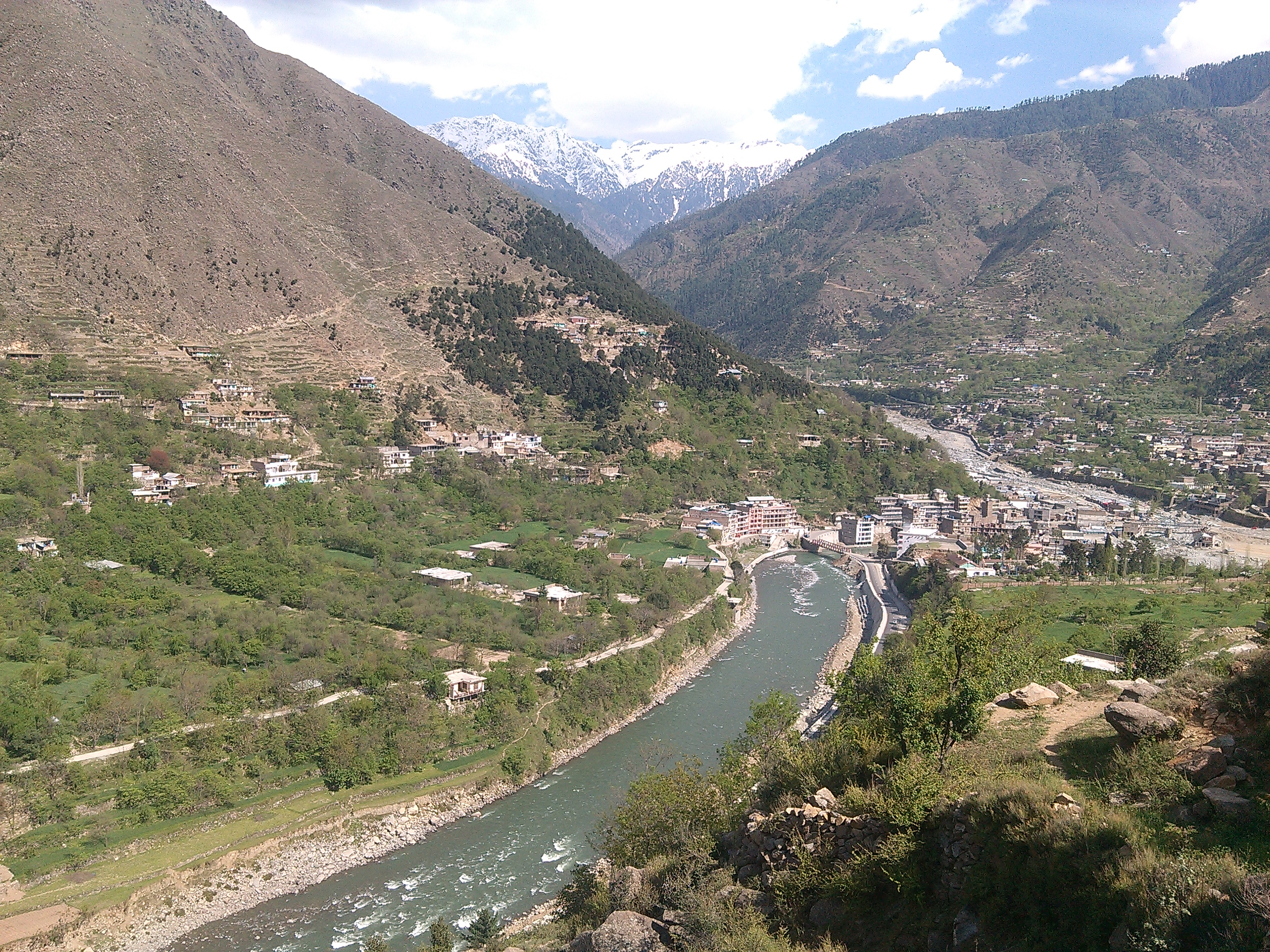

- Location within Pakistan
- Coordinates: 35°5′35″N 72°18′35″E
- Country: Pakistan
- Province: Khyber Pakhtunkhwa
- Elevation: 1,120 m (3,670 ft)

Population (2023)
  - Total: 51,821

Matta (Pashto: مټه) is the headquarters of the Upper Swat District, Khyber Pakhtunkhwa, Pakistan.

== Demographics ==
=== Population ===
Historical population
Year	Pop.	±% p.a.
1951	...	—
1961	...	—
1972	...	—
1981	...	—
1998	...	—
2017	42,547	—
2023	51,821	+3.34%

The population of town in 2017 was 42,547 but according to the 2023 Census of Pakistan, the population has risen to 51,821.
