= Karora =

Ancestral deity in Arrernte mythology

In Arrernte mythology, Karora is a bandicoot ancestral deity. According to one legend, during the Dreamtime Karora lay sleeping in the earth when from his head rose a tall pole called a tnatantja. It was a living creature, its bottom resting on his head and its top reaching up into the sky. From his armpits and navel emerged bandicoots, who dug their way out of the earth just as the first sun rose into the sky. Karora followed them, seized two of the animals, then cooked and ate them. His hunger sated, he lay down to sleep again and a bullroarer emerged from under his armpit. It took on human form and grew into a young man, and when Karora woke his son danced around him. It was the very first ceremony.

Karora's son hunted for bandicoots, which they cooked and ate, then Karora slept again and created two more sons. This continued for some time, with many more sons emerging. Eventually, all of the bandicoots Karora had created had been eaten, and the men became hungry. They hunted, but could find no game. On their way back, they heard the sound of a bullroarer, and as they searched for the source of the noise they caught sight of a sandhill wallaby. They threw their tjuringa sticks at it and broke its leg, and the sandhill wallaby called out that he was now lame and a man like them, not a bandicoot. He limped away.

The hunters continued on their way and saw Karora approaching them. He led them back to the waterhole, and as they sat at the edge of the pool a great flood of honey from the honeysuckle buds engulfed them. Karora remained at the pool, but the sons were washed away to where the sandhill wallaby man they had lamed waited for them. The place became a great djang (sacred) place, and to this day one can see the brothers grouped around the sandhill wallaby man's body — a group of rocks positioned around a great boulder.

Karora is said to remain at the waterhole, where he lies in eternal sleep. Those who come to drink there must carry green boughs, which they lay down on the banks before quenching their thirst.
