= Barikot =

Barikot بریکوټ (Pashto)
- City
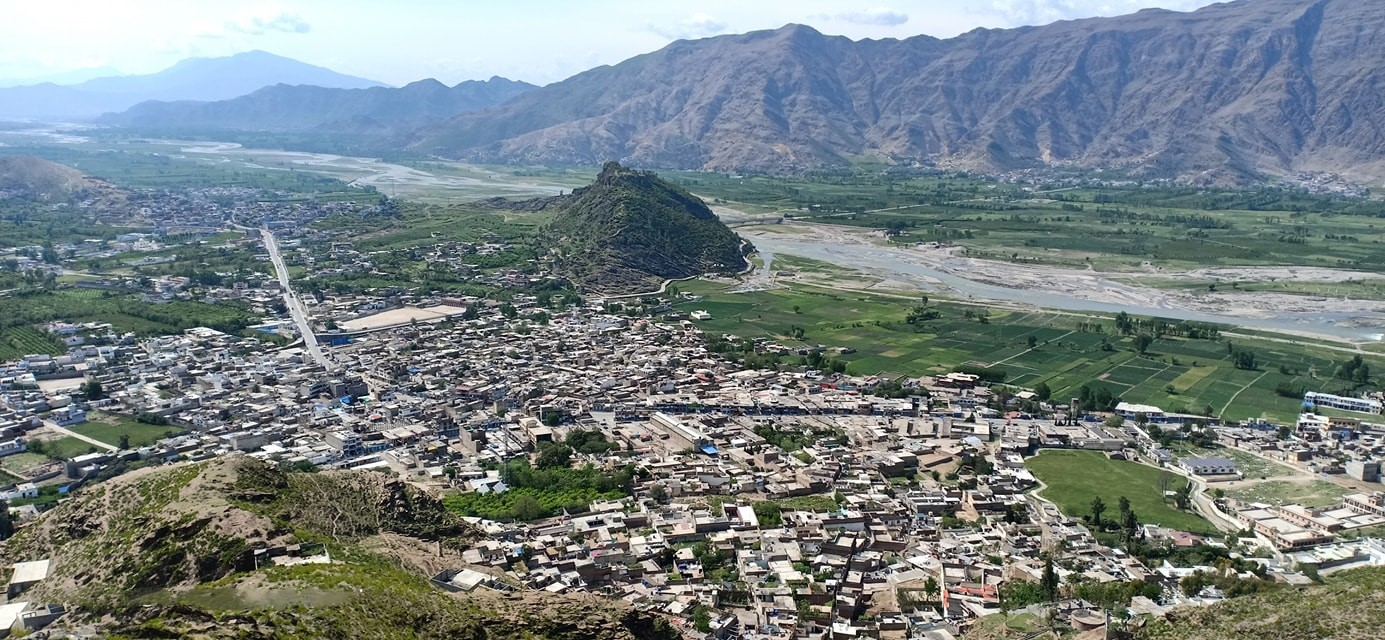
- Panoramic View: Barikot

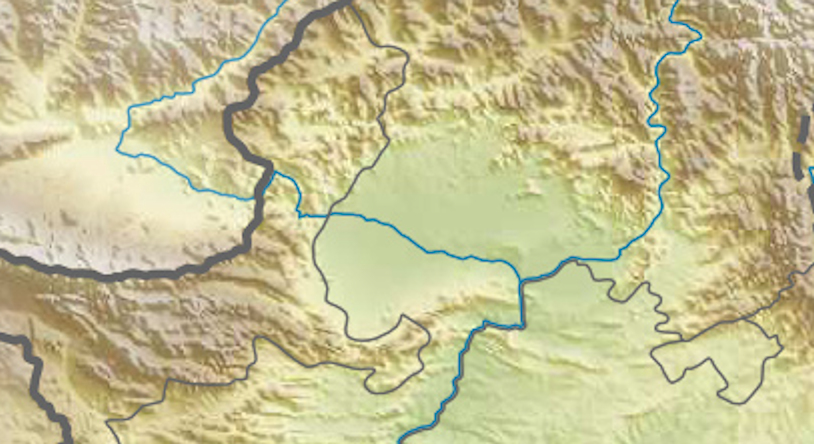
- Location within Pakistan Location within Gandhara Location within Khyber Pakhtunkhwa
- Country: Pakistan
- Province: Khyber Pakhtunkhwa
- District: Swat
- Tehsil: Barikot

Government
  - Type: Tehsil Municipal Administration
  - Tehsil Chairman: Kashif Ali
  - Tehsil Municipal Officer: Anwar Sadat
- Elevation: 808 m (2,651 ft)

Population (2023)
  - City: 115,045
  - Rank: 108th in Pakistan
- Time zone: UTC+5 (PST)
- Postal code: 19240

Barikot (Urdu: بریکوٹ; Pashto: بریکوټ) is a city located in the middle course of the Swat River in Khyber Pakhtunkhwa, Pakistan. It is located about 20 km (12 mi) away from Mingora and the Butkara Stupa. It is the entrance town to the central Swat Valley with a population of approximately 115,045 people. Barikot is the location of an ancient citadel captured by Alexander the Great, with Chalcolithic remains dating back to c. 1700 BC, and an early-historic period town dating back to c. 600 BC. The Italian Archaeological Mission (renamed ISMEO) founded by Giuseppe Tucci has been excavating ruins of the ancient town of Bazira under Barikot since 1984.

== Demographics ==
=== Population ===
Historical population
Year	Pop.	±% p.a.
2017	94,245	—
2023	115,045	+3.38%

According to 2023 census, Barikot had a population of 115,045.

Languages

Languages of Barikot

Languages of Barikot MC (2023 Census)
1. Pashto (96.7%)
2. Others (3.30%)

== Excavations ==
Although previous excavations already attested Chalcolithic pit structures since 1700 BC, urban living, earlier than c. 150 BC, was not discovered before 2015 as "[t]he archaeological sequence accepted until then was that the city was founded as a fortified centre towards the end of [the second century BC] directly on the remains of a protohistoric village, and that the major earlier evidence of the city was the massive defensive wall surrounding the city and its acropolis."

Early Iron Age proto-urban layers were found, and dated to eleventh-eight centuries BC, archaeologists also found that the fortified urban settlement in Barikot (lower area and acropolis) was established around mid-first millennium BC.

== Bronze Age (c. 1700–1400 BC) ==
The first traces of human presence in Barikot are from ca. 1700 to 1400 BC, as per Giorgio Stacul (1987) findings, which he reported as belonging to Swat Period IV, these are pit remains attested since around 1700 BC.

== Late Bronze/Iron Age (c. 1200–800 BC) ==
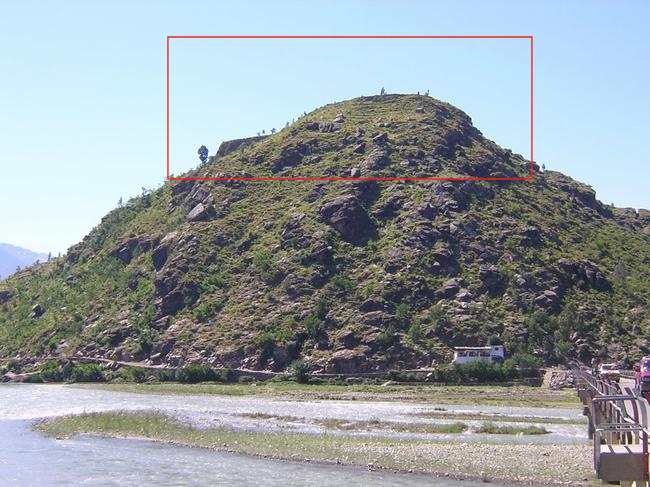
Location of Barikot (Bazira). Fort with remaining fortifications

During excavation campaigns in 2016–2017, the Italian Archaeological Mission was able to identify the transitional phase from Late Bronze to Iron age, dating it c. 1200–800 BC. Excavations were performed in trench BKG 12 W, where archaeologists found, in Macrophase 1b, residential structures and workshops, along with a toy-cart, bi-carinated pottery, miniature vessels, stone tools, and incised pottery, all radiocarbon-dated between 1196 and 1021 BC (95.4% probability model).

During this time, c. 1200 to 800 BC, archaeological data show the presence of a large settlement (around 15 ha), including a hilltop acropolis, commented by Callieri et al. (2000), an inner stronghold, and an extensive outer graveyard. This phase was previously known as Gandhara grave culture.

== Abandonment Phase (c. 800–600 BC) ==
After the Iron Age, the settlement suffered the collapse of its earthen rampart in Macrophase 1c. The site was abandoned and alluvium covered the place in Interphase 1c/2a, between c. 800 and 600 BC.

== The Beginning of the City and Achaemenid Acculturation Phase (c. 600–400 BC) ==
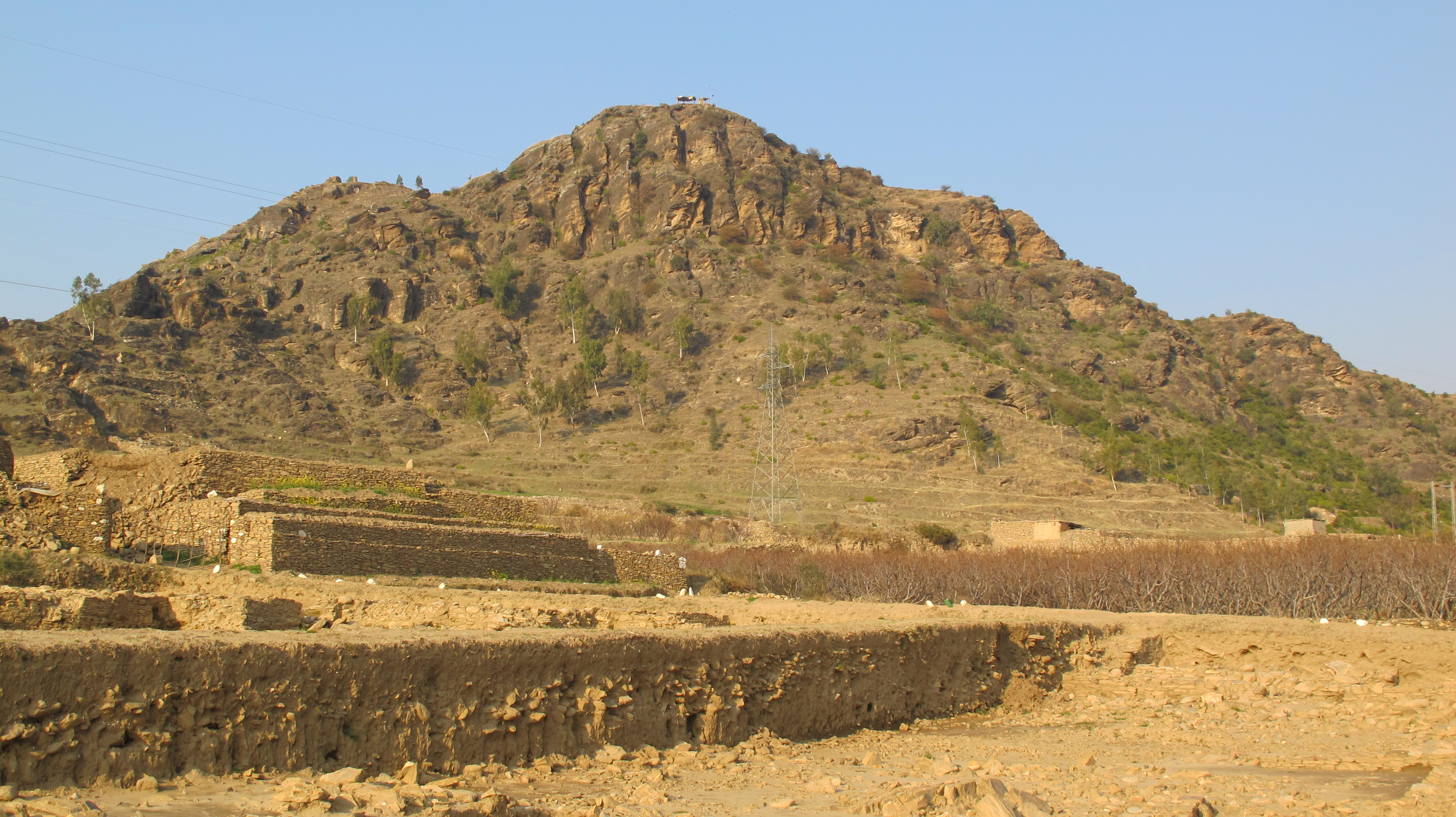
City of Barikot in the foreground, and the remains of the Bazira fortress are on top of the Ghundai Hill.

After the abandonment, the beginning of the city can be traced back archaeologically to Macrophase 2a1, between 600 and 500 BC, a pre-Achaemenid phase, attested poorly in finds and pottery, featuring "only a badly preserved stretch of a wall with evidence of a passageway marked by wheel traces."

The Achaemenid acculturation belongs to Macrophase 2a2, from 500 to 400 BC. This influence from c. 500 to 450 BC started with "the local production of tulip bowls at Barikot [which] suggests that since the first half of [the 5th century BC] processes of emulation and social aspiration were at work among the Swat elite," in the Classic period of that Persian Empire. Archaeologists found, in this phase of Barikot, luxury pottery typical of the Achaemenids, but also saw the introduction of non-luxury Indic pottery, and many local glass objects.

== Regionalization Phase (c. 400–250 BC) ==
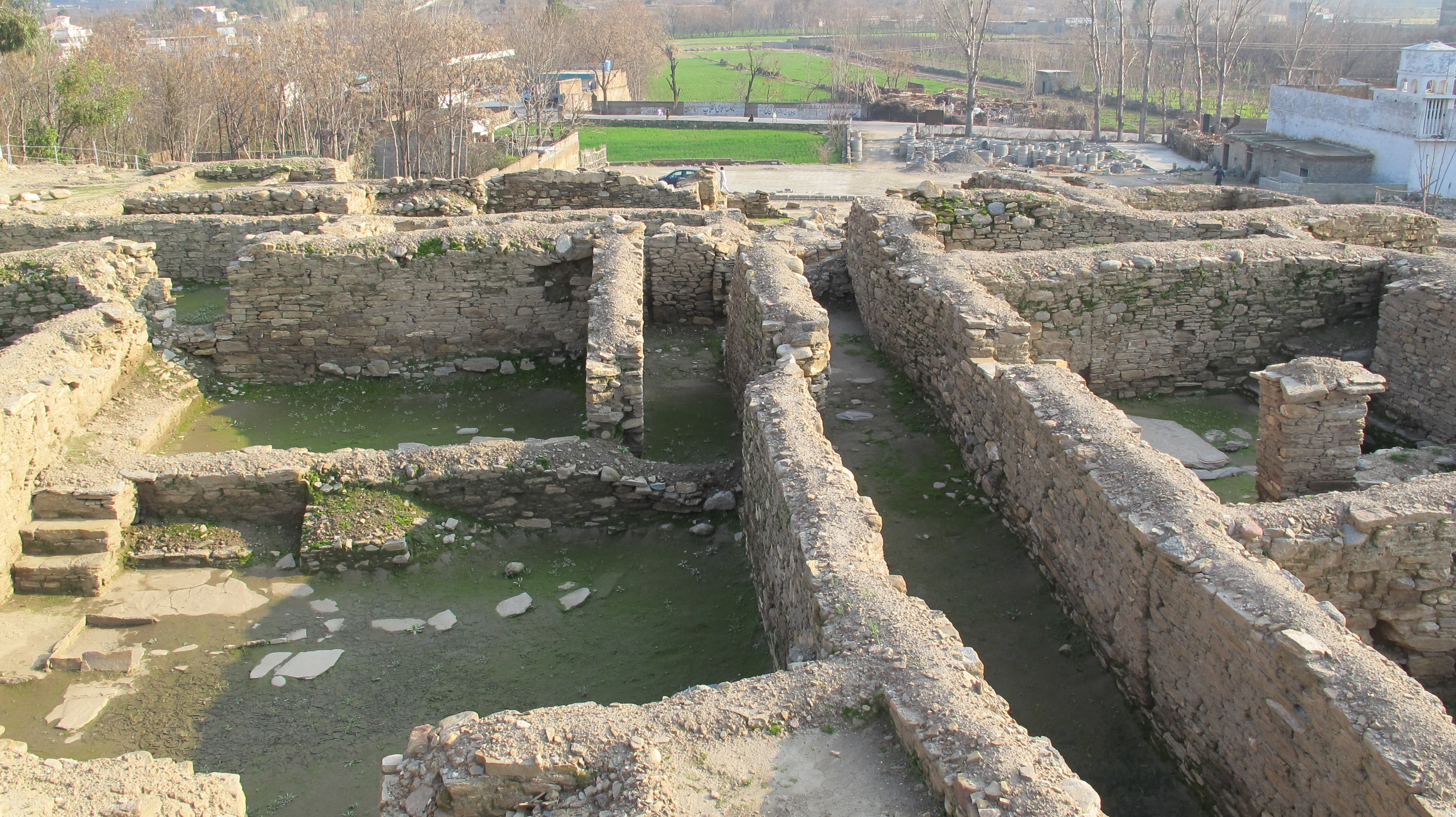
Ruins of Barikot.

Greek and Latin sources like Curtius Rufus, talking of this period, tell that Swat and Gandhara were not controlled by Achaemenids anymore (from around 350 BC), and that a tribe known as Assakenoi ruled the region allied to other Indian tribes. Italian Mission archaeologists consider this phase saw the complete disappearance of Achaemenid ceramic forms, but that household Indic vessels were still in use at Barikot. This belongs to archaeological Macrophase 2b, from c.400 to 250 BC, and Macedonian siege to Barikot (Bazira) occurred within this period, in autumn of 327 BC. Also during Macrophase 2b, in trench BKG 11, a Mauryan coin was found, radiocarbon dated to 349–282 BC (95.4% probability model), what is 315 +/- 34 BC.

== Mauryan and Greco-Bactrian Kingdoms Linking Phase (c. 250–200 BC) ==
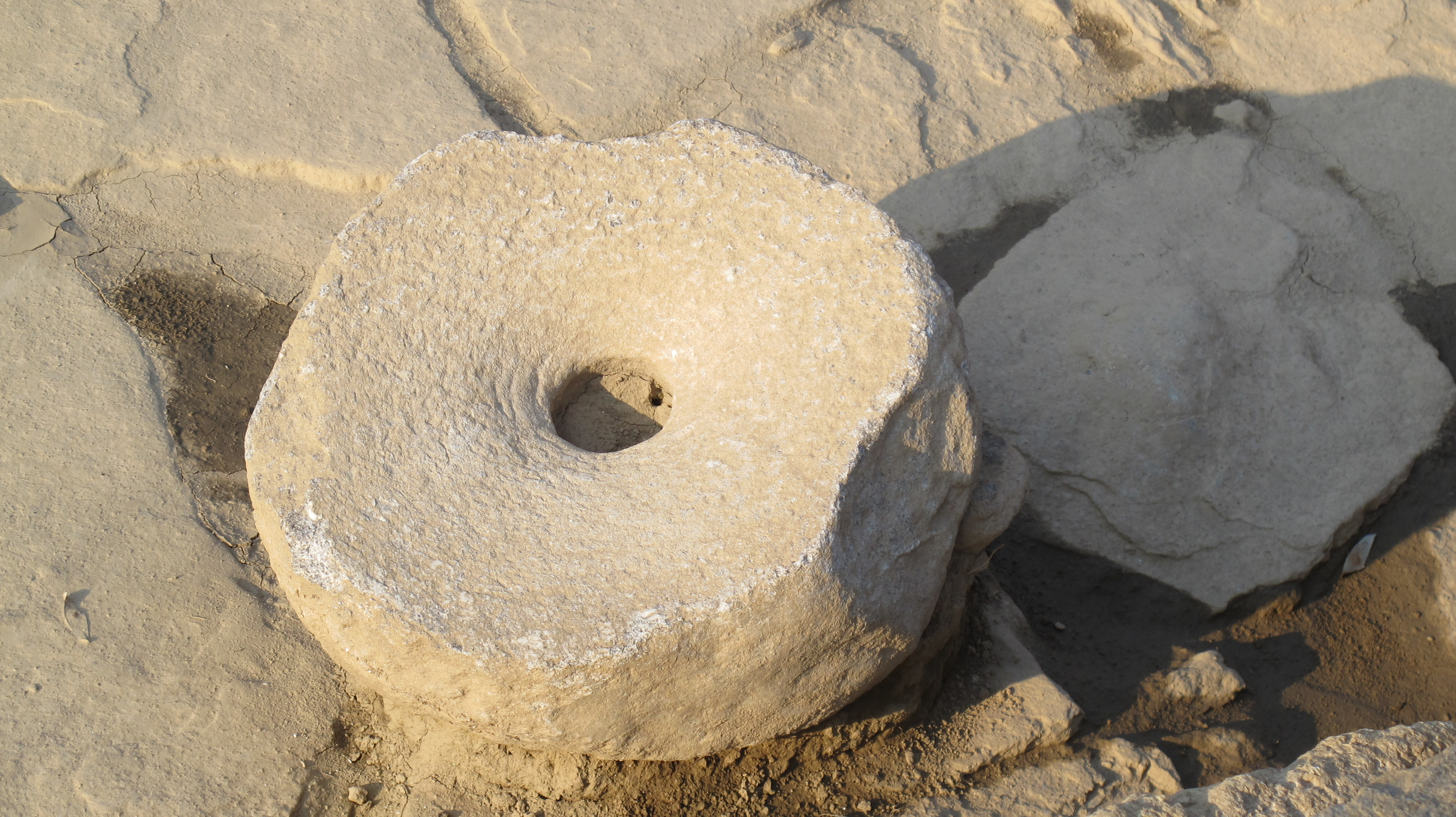
Barikot artefact.

Beginning in 2011, an excavation in the south west corner of the site discovered several older settlements than expected.

In 2016, one pre-Indo-Greek level was dated to the mid 3rd century BC or in the middle of the Mauryan era. During this time, known archaeologically as Macrophase 3a1, Barikot was part of a political and commercial network linking Mauryan and Greco-Bactrian kingdoms, as both Greco-Bactrian and Hellenistic pottery forms were introduced in the site with clear relationships to northern Afghanistan and Central Asia, just like Ai-Khanoum.

== Old Apsidal Temple ==
In December 2021, archaeologists of Ca’ Foscari University and Italian Archaeological Mission in collaboration with the provincial department of archaeology and museums in Pakistan, led by Dr. Luca Maria Olivieri, announced the discovery of the earliest Buddhist apsidal temple in Barikot (the ancient Bazira). They claim it was constructed in the times of Ashoka's reign in Mauryan period, around 250 BC. It was also found that this structure was still in function during the reign of Menander I, the Indo-Greek king, in the mid-second century BC, but even though it was enhanced in later times, it came to an end around the third or fourth century of the Common Era, as the city was abandoned by the Kushan rulers of the time due to an earthquake. This is the earliest apsidal temple found in Pakistan until now, and is a revolutionary discovery also because it proves the presence of Buddhism in Swat since the 3rd century BC, and confirms that Menander I, known as Milinda by early Buddhists, supported this cult.

"We have found coins, among which a silver specimen issued by King Menander, an onyx-made seal decorated with a Hellenistic intaglio depicting the image of a youth in Greek attire with a Kharosthi inscription, a monumental Kharosthi epigraph, many other Kharosthi inscriptions on pots, and potsherds belonging to the Indo-Greek cultural horizon such as fish plates and polished black pottery that imitates Attic models," said the archaeologist Dr Michele Minardi, member of the Italian mission.

A 2024 publication by Luca Maria Olivieri considers that: "[The] apsidal temple [is] associated with an Indian-style Buddhist stupa [...] dating to the time of the great promoter of Buddhism, the Mauryan Emperor Ashoka (r. 268-232 BC). The monument was modified from an earlier, non-Buddhist shrine from the time when Alexander the Great besieged Barikot in 327 BC."

== Indo-Greek Phase (c. 200–100 BC) ==
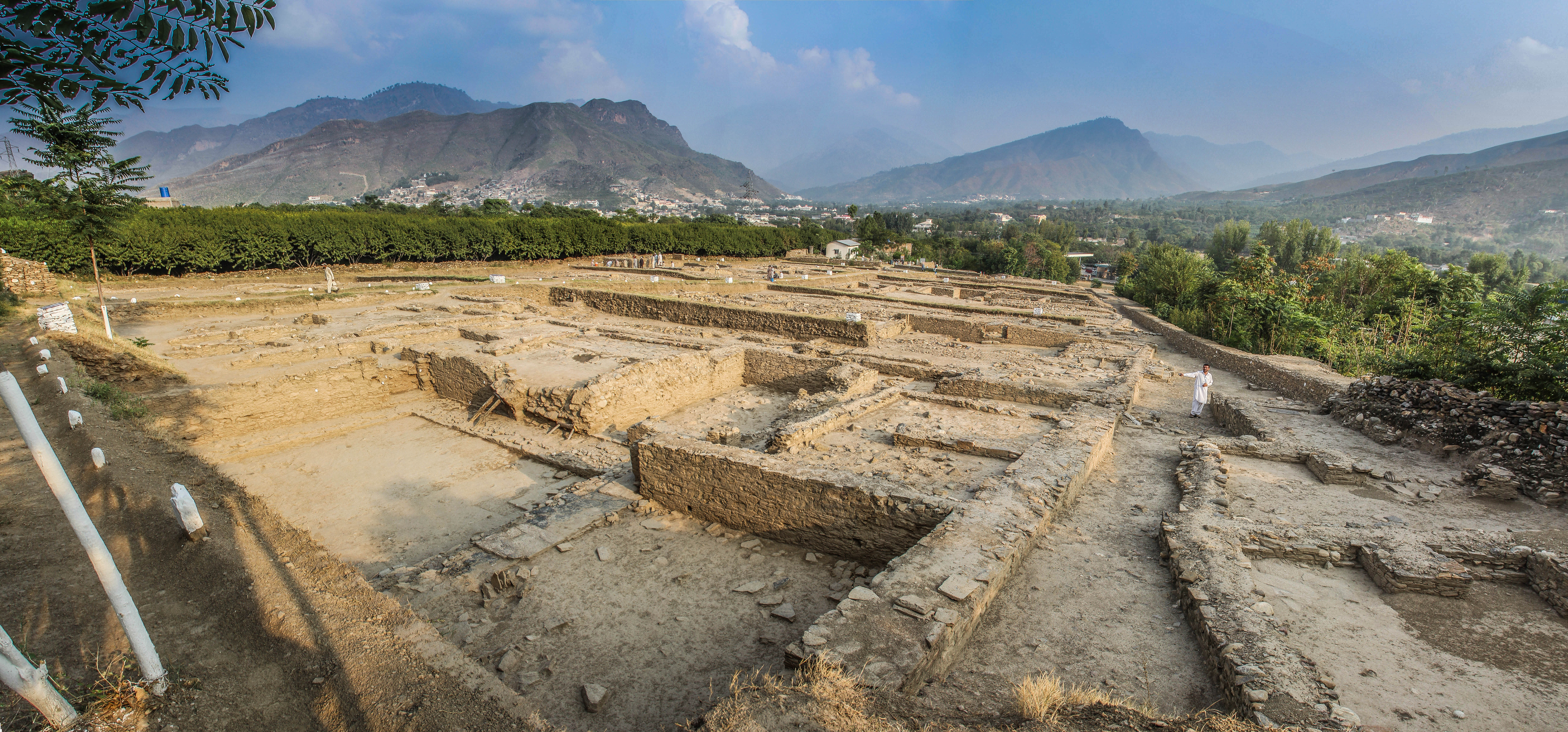
Barikot ruins panorama.

The Italian expeditions in the 1980s and 90s discovered an Indo-Greek town from around the time of King Menander I in the 2nd century BC. The 2nd century BC town covered, at its peak, an area of about 12 ha (30 acres) including the acropolis, or about 7 ha (17 acres) without. It was surrounded by a defensive wall with massive rectangular bastions. This defensive wall, constructed around Barikot during the Indo-Greek phase belongs to Macrophase 3a2, after 200 BC, as per 2016–2017 excavations by the same Italian mission when this wall, massive and imposing, was dated by numismatic findings and radiocarbon analysis. A burial associated with the construction of this Indo-Greek city wall was dated to (c. 130–115 BC), between the final part of Menader I's reign and the beginning of that of Antalkidas.

== Sakas and Parthians Phase (c. 50 BC–70 AD) ==
Belonging to Macrophase 3b, this period in Barikot attests "historically and culturally [...] the annexation of Swat by Sakas and Parthians [...]" as before 80 AD the defensive wall was reinforced.

== Early Kushan Phase (c. 70-200 AD) ==
This period belongs to Macrophase 4a and 4b in Early Kushan times, when "in the first centuries of the Common Era, [t]his geographical area appears to have acted as a referential space for at least three distinct and overlapping religious and social realities: the Buddhist saṃgha, the so-called ‘Dardic’ communities, and Barikot’s urban elites."

== Late Kushan Phase (c. 200-250 AD) ==
This period belongs to Macrophase 5a (c. 200-250 AD).

Under the Kushan Empire it grew into a major town before a series of earthquakes in the 3rd century AD devastated it. Probably due to the damage from the earthquakes as well as the decline of the Kushan Empire, Bazira was abandoned by the end of the 3rd century.

The excavations have discovered a number of artifacts which document the daily life of the residents, including coins, pottery and weapons. Several large artifacts including, a large green-schist statue of Siddhartha Buddha riding his horse Kanthaka and a carving of a stupa with two lions, document the Buddhist history of Bazira. Another statue depicting an unknown deity sitting on a throne, with long, curled hair, holding a wine goblet and a severed goat head in his hands may represent Dionysus, the Greek god of wine or another local deity.

== Late Kushan, sub-Kushan, and Kushano-Sasanian Phase (c. 250-400 AD) ==
This period belongs to Macrophase 5b (c. 250-300 AD), and Macrophase 6 (c. 300-400) of late Kushan, sub-Kushan, and Kushano-Sasanian.

== Abandonment Phase (c. 400-550 AD) ==
The Macrophase 7, (c. 400-550 AD) is considered as an abandonment phase, although a sacred building was constructed.

== Shahi Phase (c. 680-1000 AD) ==
The Shahi phase belongs to Macrophase 8, (c. 680-1000 AD).

Turk Shahi was a Kabul-based Turkic dynasty which also ruled Swat Valley (from 7th to 9th centuries AD), so members of the Italian Archaeological Mission in Pakistan were able to find a unique temple from this period, built in Barikot, on the top of Ghwandai mound. It's an important discovery as there are few cultic centres in this region belonging to Shahi periods in general. Dr. Luca Maria Olivieri said the temple was built around 700 AD., by that time Uddiyana (Swat Valley) was ruled by a king known as "From Kesar", who was the son of Khurasan Tegin Shah, a well-known Turk Shahi king from Kabul, and that the temple was re-established and maintained till the Hindu Shahi time (ca 1000 AD). The temple is also mentioned in a Hindu Shahi inscription, found in Barikot in the late 19th century and conserved in Lahore Museum.

== Ghaznavid Phase (c. 1000-1100 AD) ==
The Ghaznavid phase belongs to Macrophase 9a, (c. 1000-1100 AD).
