= Upper Swat District =

Pakistani administrative area

Upper Swat District ضلع بالائی سوات بر سوات اولسوالۍ
- District
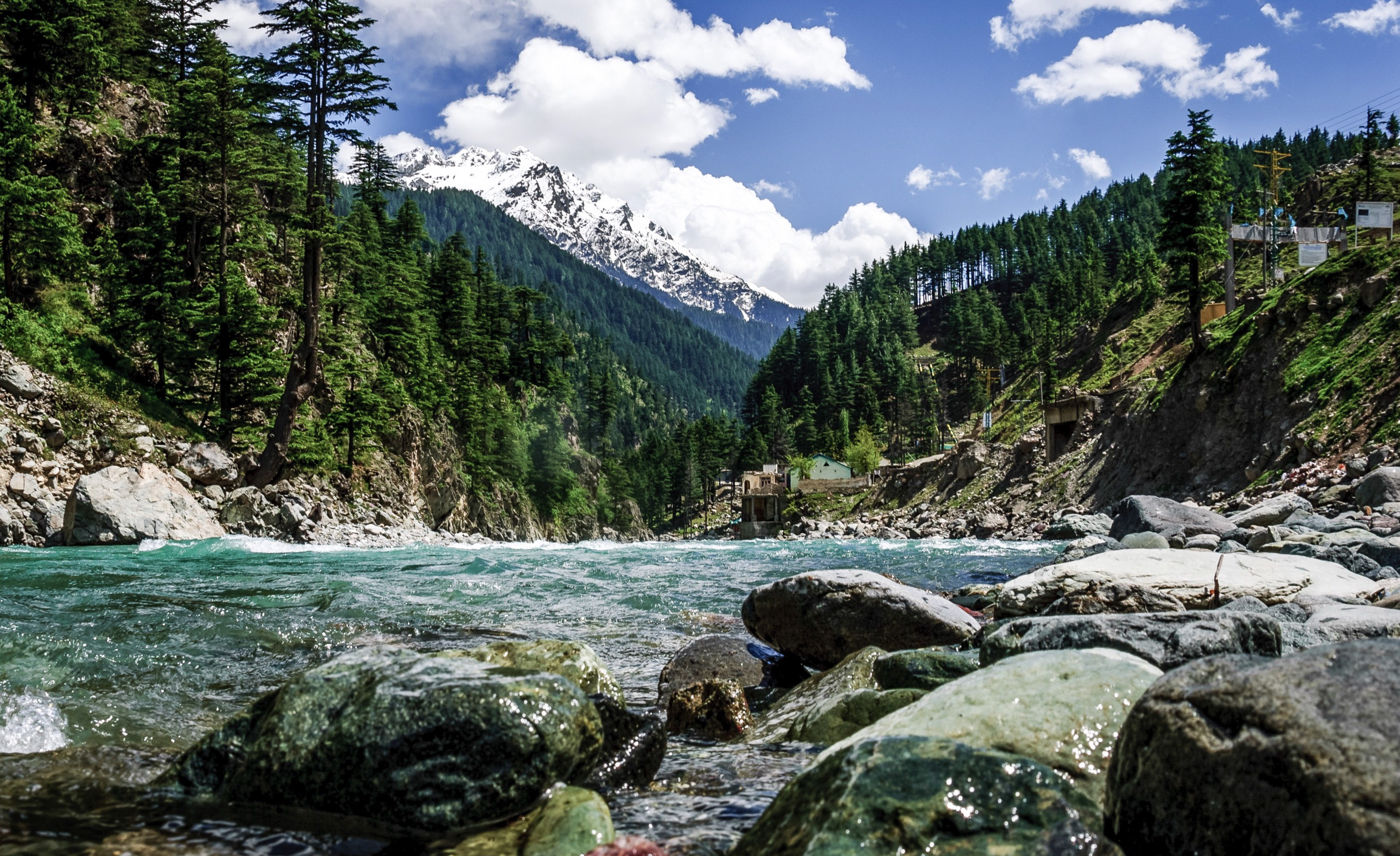
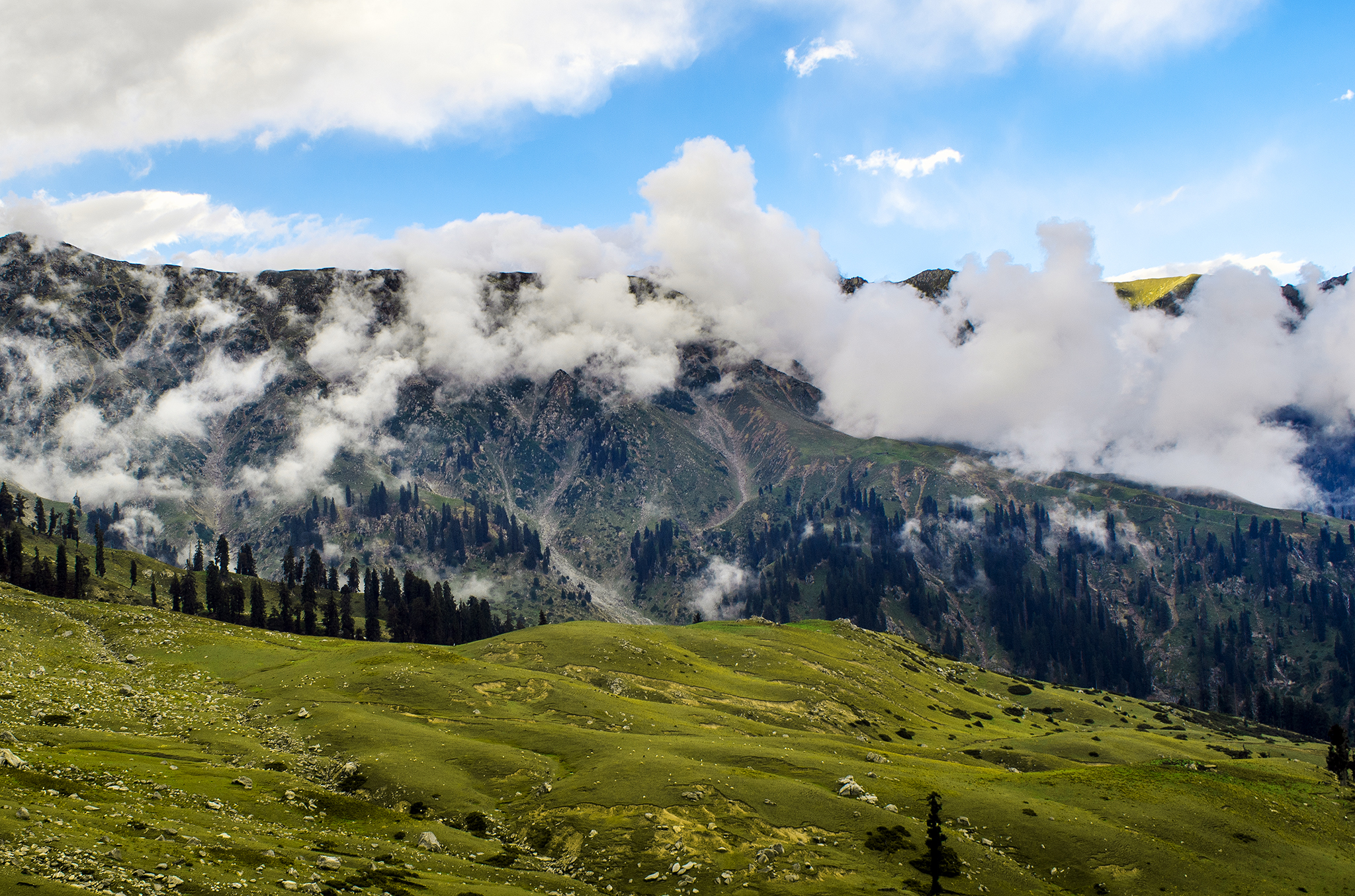
- Top: Swat River; Bottom: Gabin Jabba
- Interactive map of Upper Swat District
- Coordinates: 35°12′N 72°29′E
- Country: Pakistan
- Province: Khyber Pakhtunkhwa
- Division: Malakand
- Established: 20 December 2025
- Capital: Matta, Swat
- Largest city: Matta, Swat
- Number of Tehsils: 3

Government
  - Type: District Administration

Area
  - Total: 3,975 km^{2} (1,535 sq mi)

Population
  - Total: 1,130,354
  - Density: 284.4/km^{2} (736.5/sq mi)

Literacy
- Time zone: UTC+5 (PKT)
- Website: swat.kp.gov.pk

Upper Swat District (Urdu: ضلع بالائی سوات), also known as Bar Swat District (Pashto: بر سوات اولسوالۍ) is a district in Khyber Pakhtunkhwa, Pakistan. It was carved out of the Swat District in October 2025. It consists of the Behrain, Matta and Khwazakhela tehsils of former Swat District, with Matta as headquarter.

With forests, alpine meadows, and snow-capped mountains, Upper Swat is one of the country's most popular tourist destinations.

== Geography ==
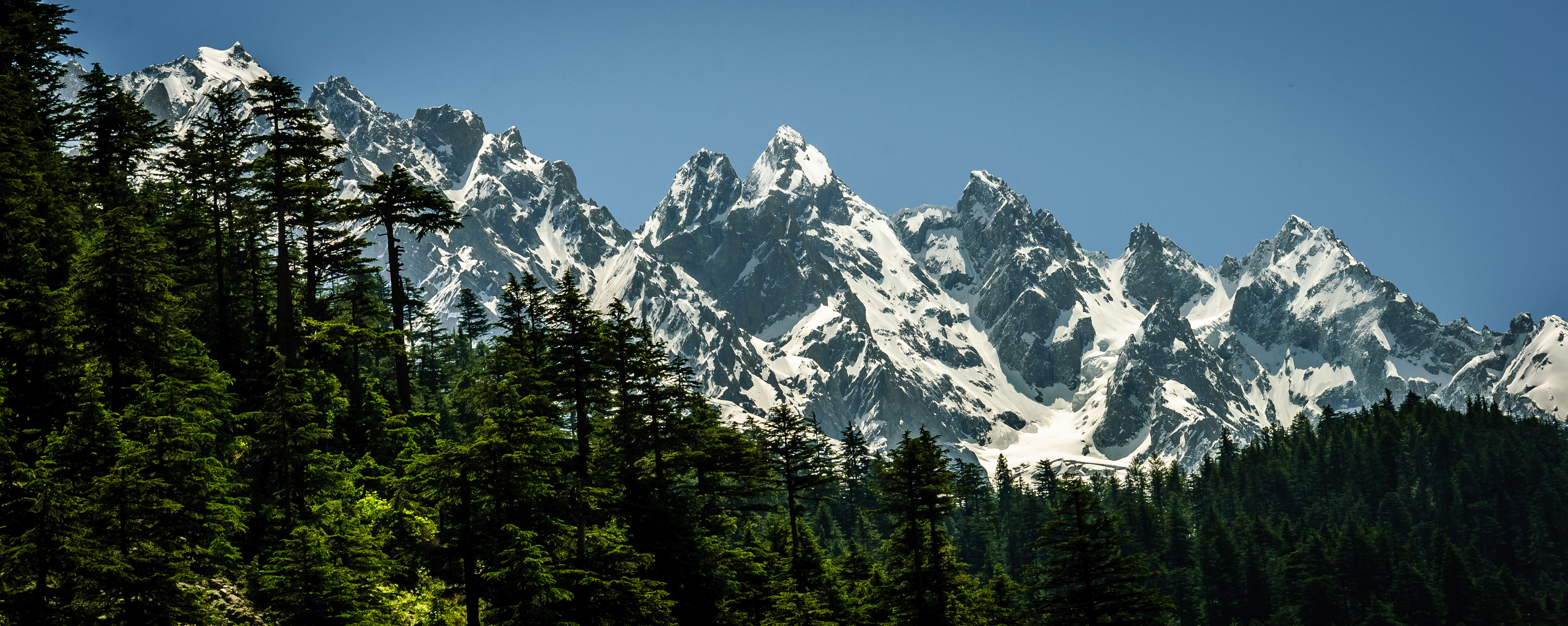
Upper Swat is enclosed by tall mountains.

Upper Swat District largely consists of Swat Kohistan, with two smaller plain tehsils. Swat Kohistan forms the larger, northern part of the district. Administratively, it is surrounded by Lower Chitral and Upper Dir to the west, Gilgit-Baltistan to the north, and Kohistan and Shangla to the east and southeast, respectively.

The Swat Valley is enclosed by mountains that forms a natural geographic boundary for it. The Swat River whose headwaters arise in the 5,500-to-5,800-metre-tall (18,000–19,000 ft) Hindu Kush mountain range runs through the length of the region. The main area consists of many sub valleys such as Kalam, Bahrain, Matiltan, Utror, and Gabral.

== History ==
In August 2025, the Khyber Pakhtunkhwa government announced the plan to divide the Swat District. A notification was issued by the Revenue Department directing the Commissioners of Malakand Division and the Deputy Commissioner of Swat to submit a report on the division plan within three days.

On 19 December the provincial cabinet approved the bifurcation of the district and the creation of Upper Swat District, with Matta as the headquarter. It is known for tourism and is also known as Switzerland of the East.

== Demographics ==
=== Languages ===
Languages of Upper Swat district (2023)
1. Pashto (83.3%)
2. (mainly Gujari, Torwali, Gawri) (13.5%)
3. Kohistani (3.10%)

Upper Swat District is mostly inhabited by Pashto speaking communities who make up 83.27% of the population. Languages classified as 'Others', mainly Gawri, Torwali and Gujari are spoken by 13.48% of the population, and form the majority in the Swat Kohistan region of Upper Swat.

== Administrative divisions ==
Tehsil map of the former Swat District; the northernmost three (Behrain, Matta and Khwazakhela) are in Upper Swat.

Upper Swat is subdivided into three administrative units, known as Tehsils:

Tehsil	Area (km^{2})	Pop. (2023)	Density (ppl/km^{2}) (2023)	Literacy rate (2023)	Union Councils
Behrain Tehsil	2,899	270,623	93.35	45.26%	
Matta Tehsil	684	552,431	807.65	65.54%	
Khwaza Khela Tehsil	392	307,300	783.93	70%	

Each tehsil comprises certain numbers of union councils.

== Gallery ==
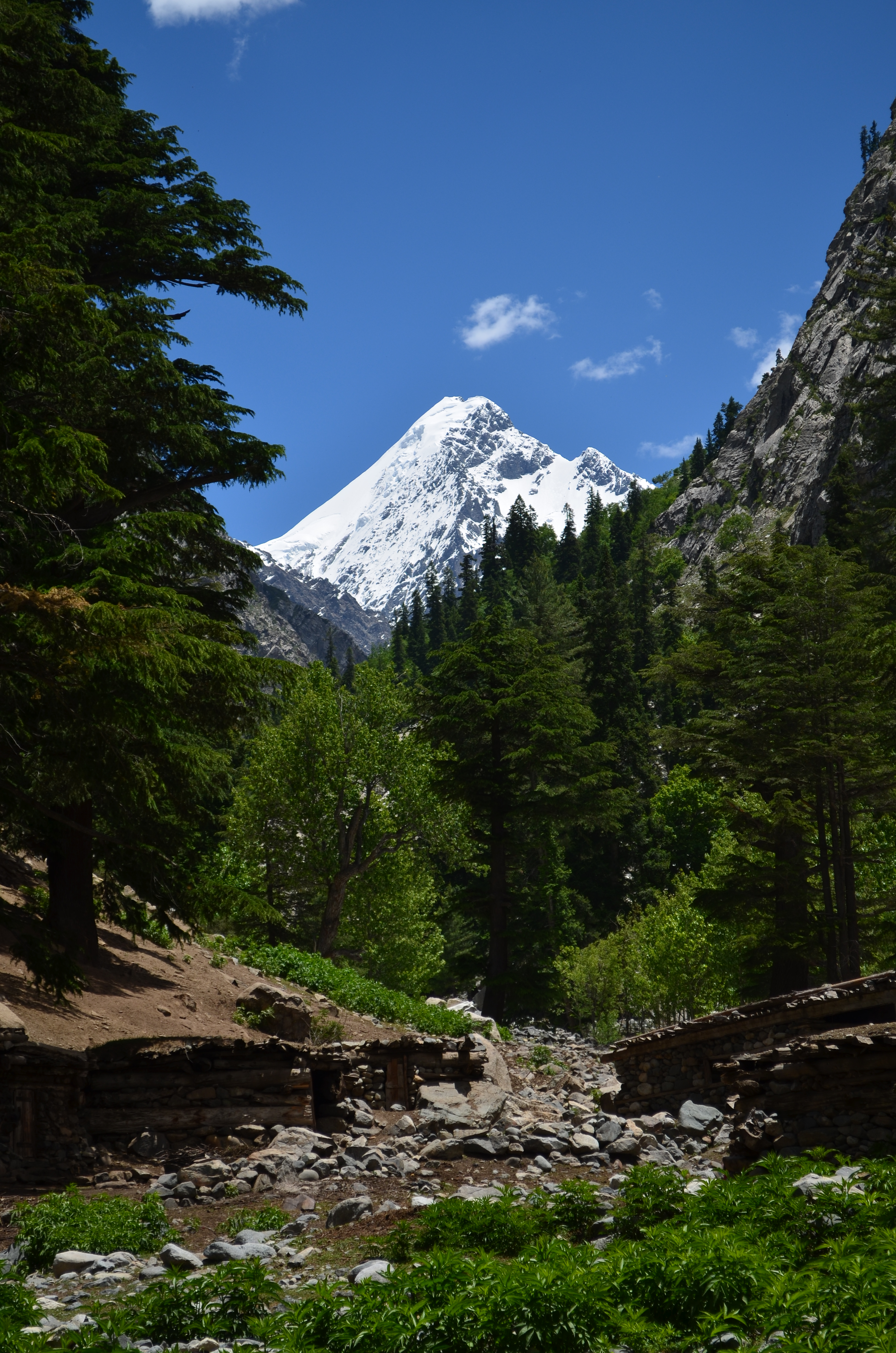
Falak Sar, Upper Swat's highest mountain at 5,957 metres (19,544 ft)

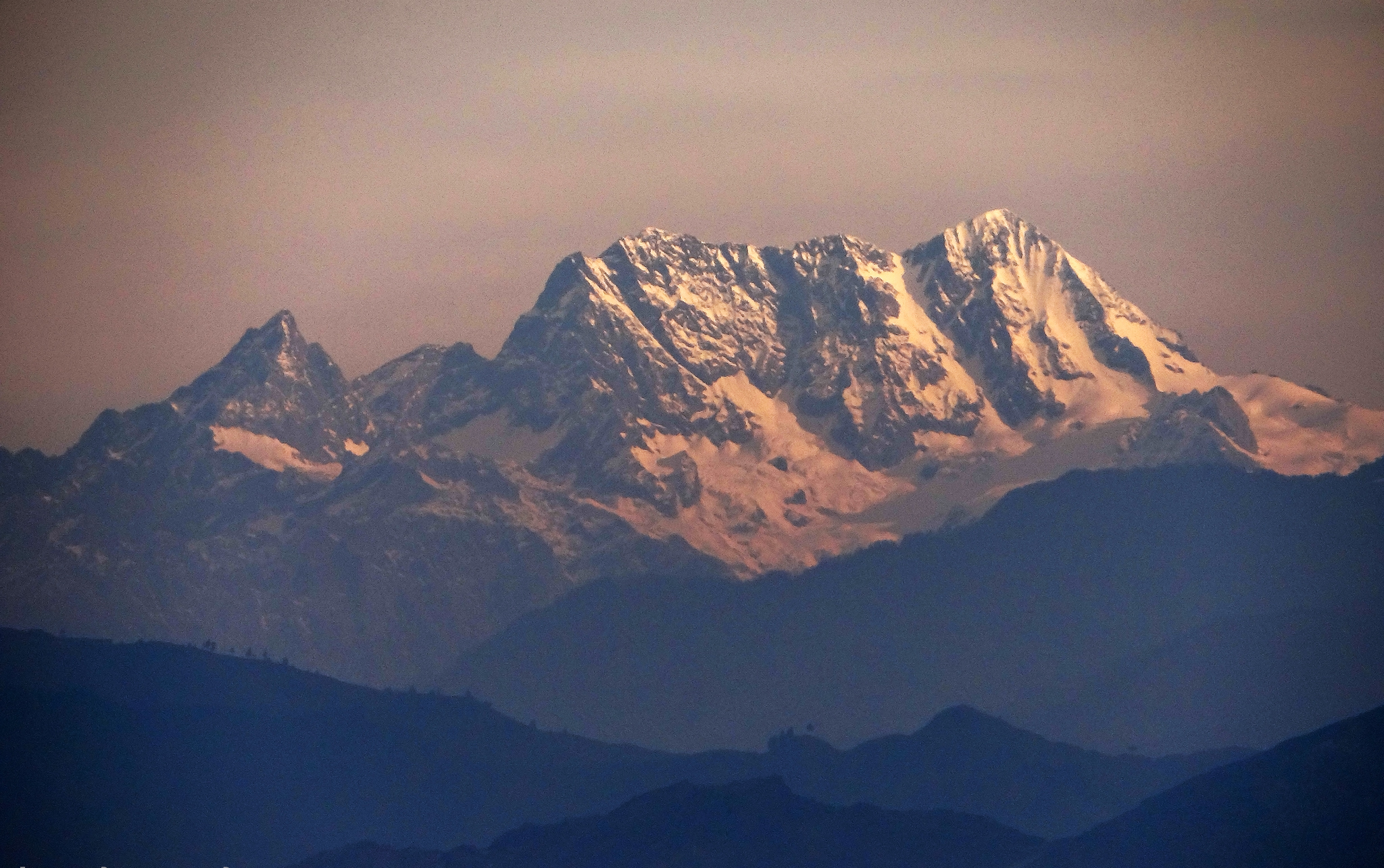
Mankial Sar, which rises to 5,700 m (18,600 ft)

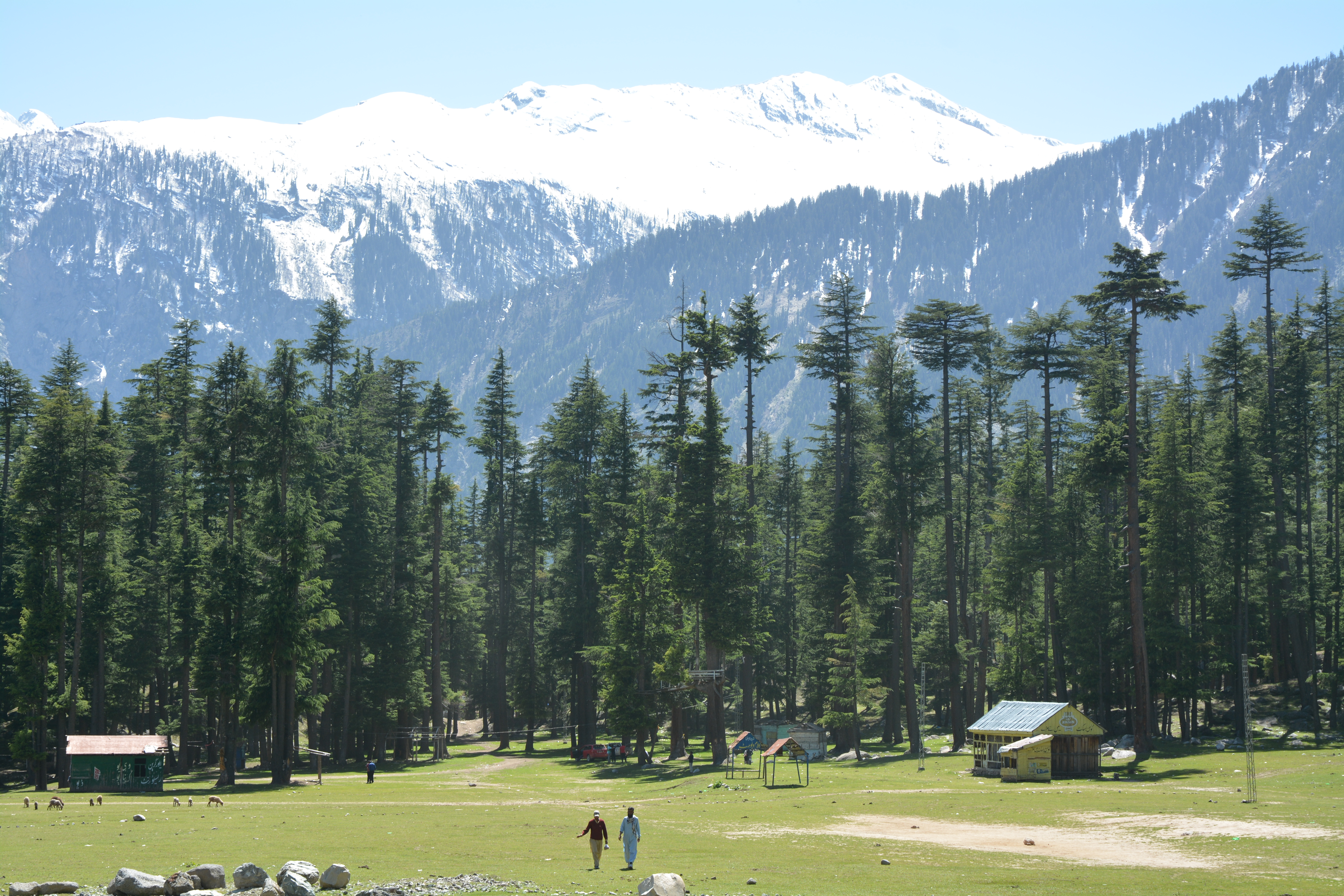
Pine forests occur in Upper Swat at elevations over 1,500 m (5,000 ft)

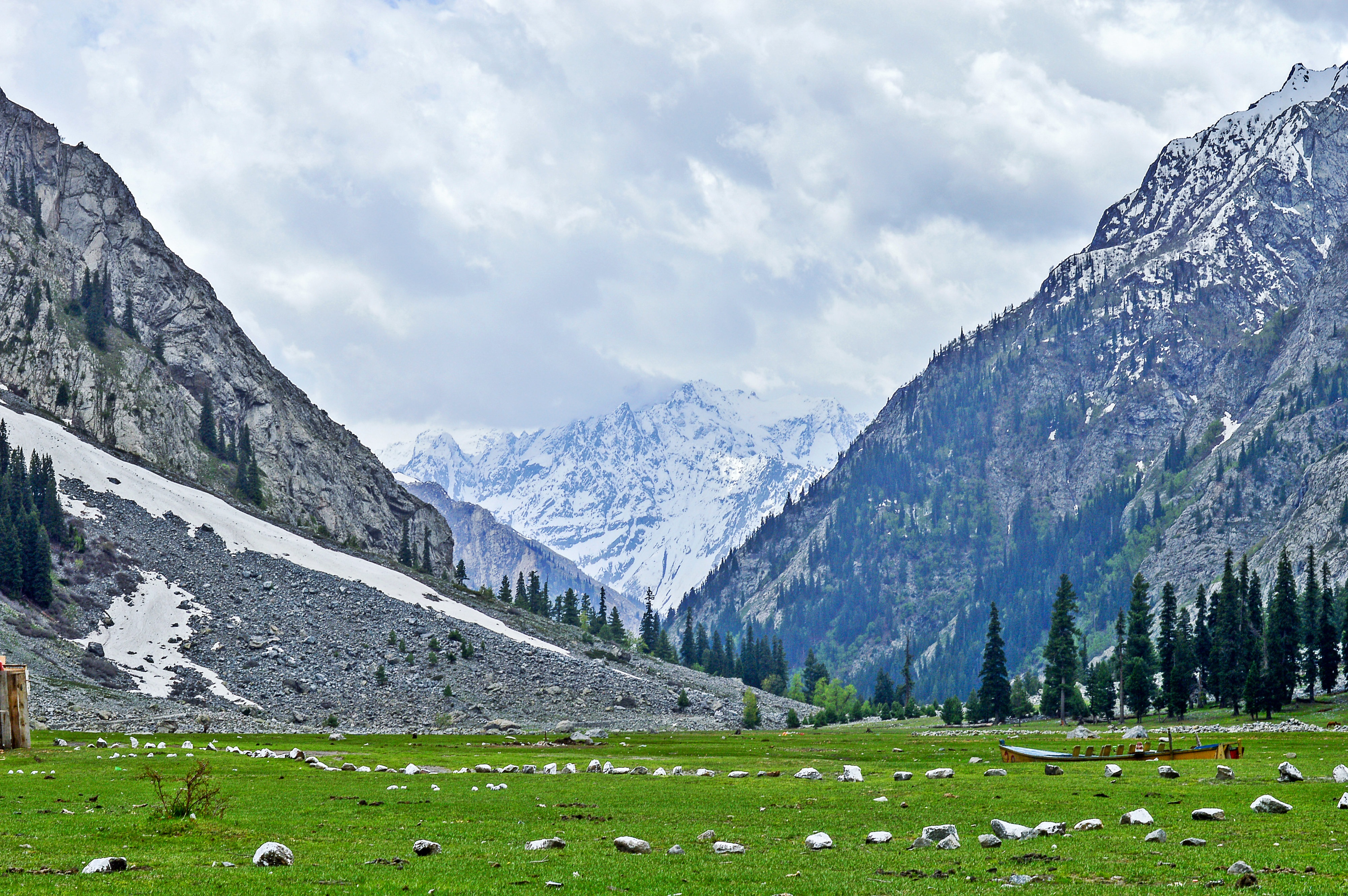
The northernmost region of Swat – a region known as Kohistan – has high alpine valley at the base of tall mountains

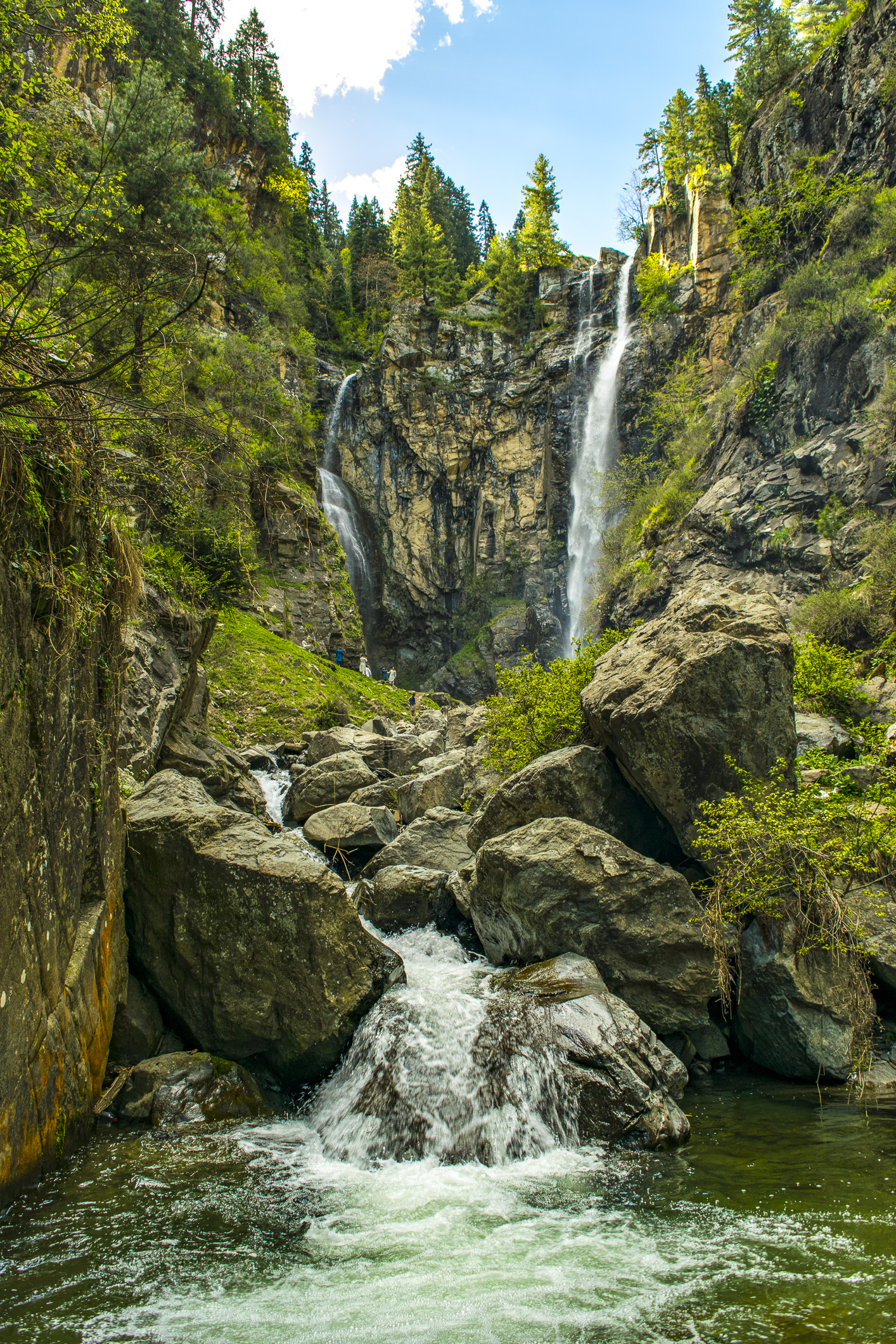
Jarogo Waterfall in Upper Swat

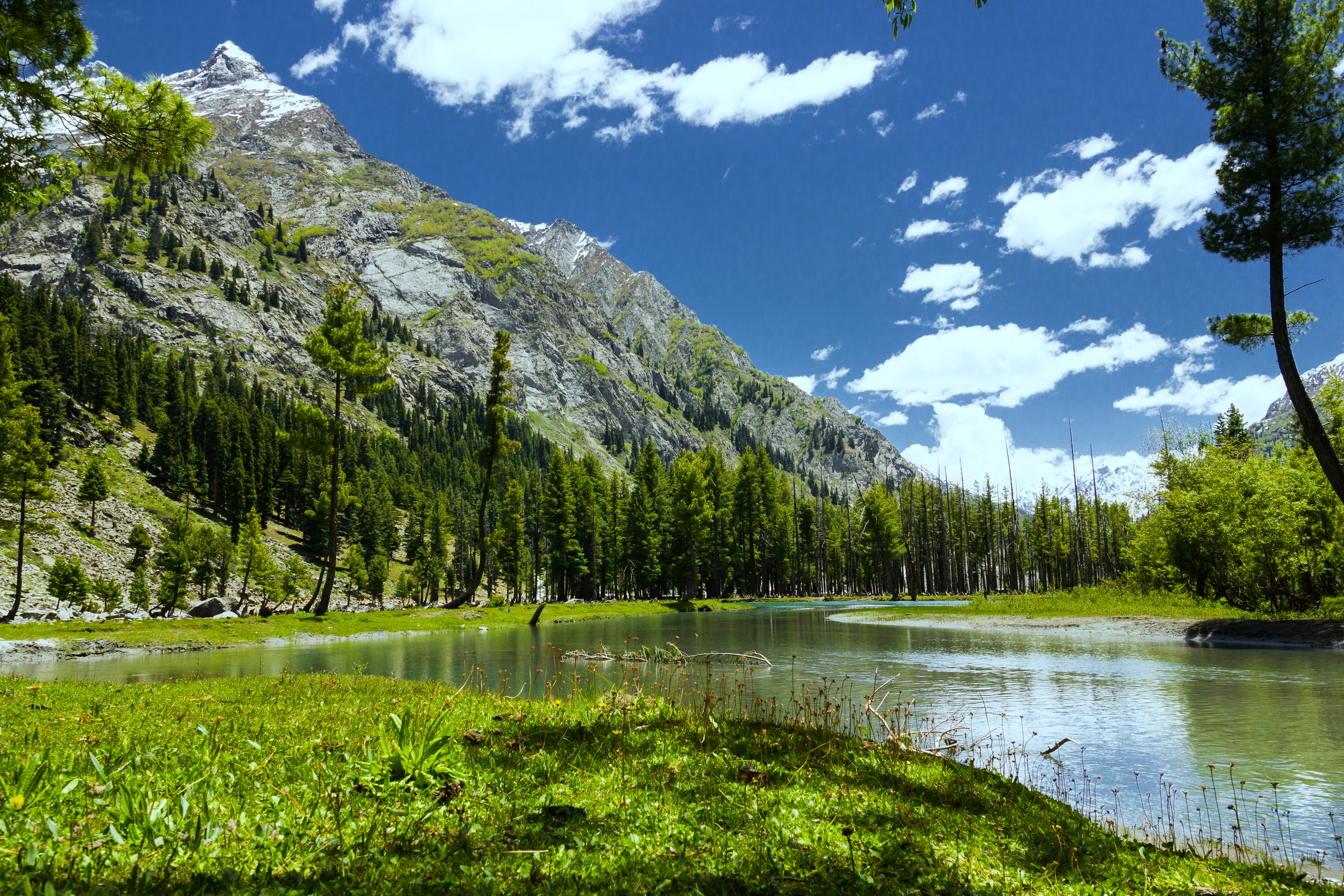
Alpine lakes, such as Mahodand Lake are found in the mountains of Swat Kohistan.

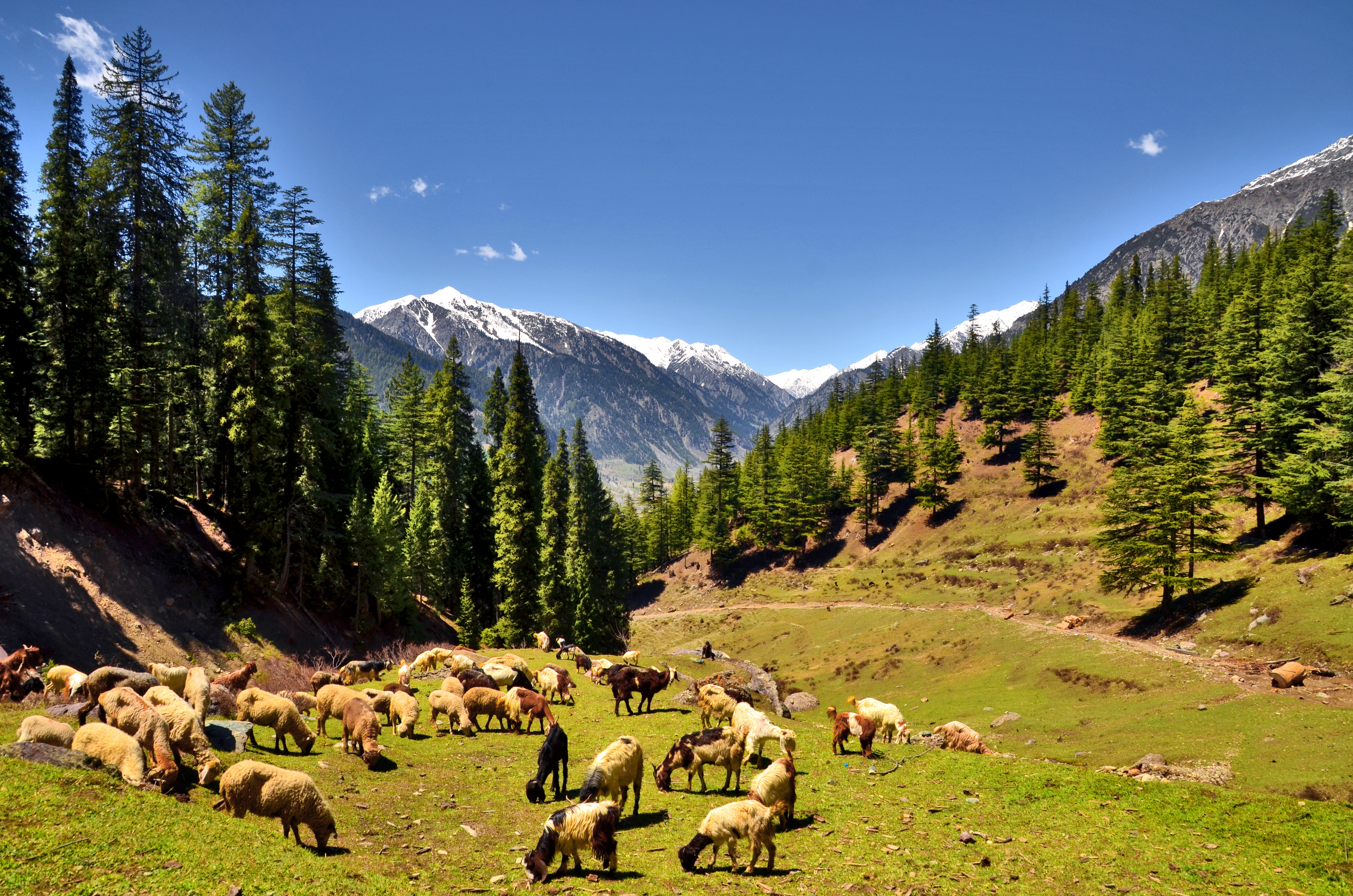
Alpine meadows in Utror
