= List of valleys in Pakistan =

A large part of Pakistan is within the broad Indus Valley, which forms a high number of valleys, especially in the provinces of Gilgit-Baltistan and Khyber-Pakhtunkhwa. Following is a list of valleys in Pakistan by its administrative units.

== Khyber Pakhtunkhwa ==
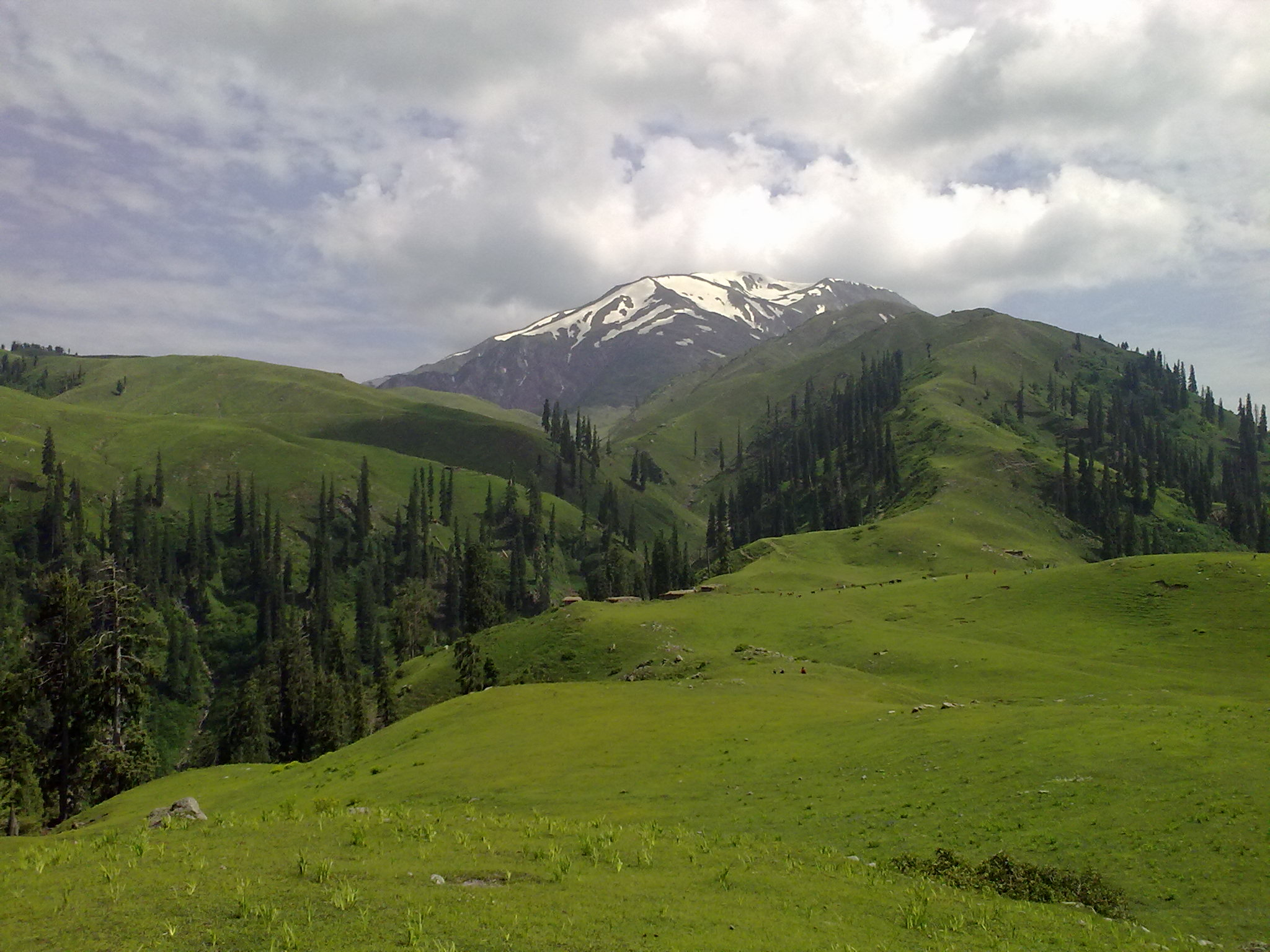
Kaghan Valley in Khyber Pakhtunkhwa

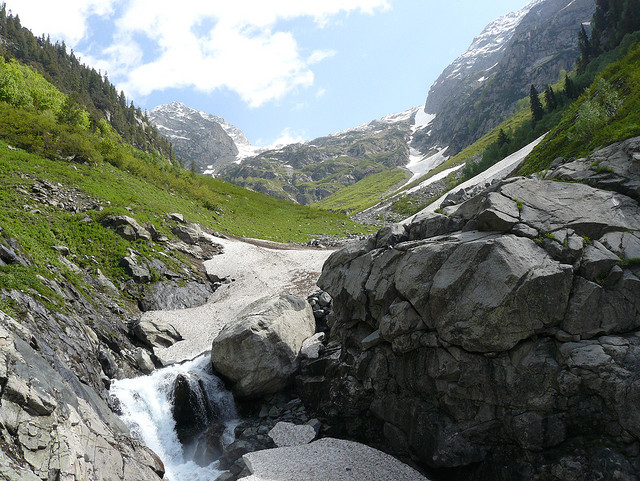
Palas Valley in Khyber Pakhtunkhwa

- Allai Valley
- Bahrain Valley
- Baroghil Valley
- Battagram Valley
- Biori Valley
- Bumburet Valley
- Chitral Valley
- Gabina Jabba Valley
- Gabral Valley
- Jarogo Valley
- Kaghan Valley
- Kalam Valley
- Kalash Valleys
- Kaniguram Valley
- Khanki Valley
- Khot Valley
- Konsh Valley
- Kurrum Valley
- Kumrat Valley
- Kunar Valley
- Madyan Valley
- Marandeh Valley
- Marghazar Valley
- Miandam Valley
- Miranzai Valley
- Palas Valley
- Panjkora Valley
- Rumbur Valley
- Shaikhdara Valley
- Shinkari Valley
- Siran Valley
- Swat Valley
- Tikri Valley
- Tirat Valley
- Tirah Valley
- Tochi Valley
- Ushu Valley
- Utror Valley

== Gilgit-Baltistan ==
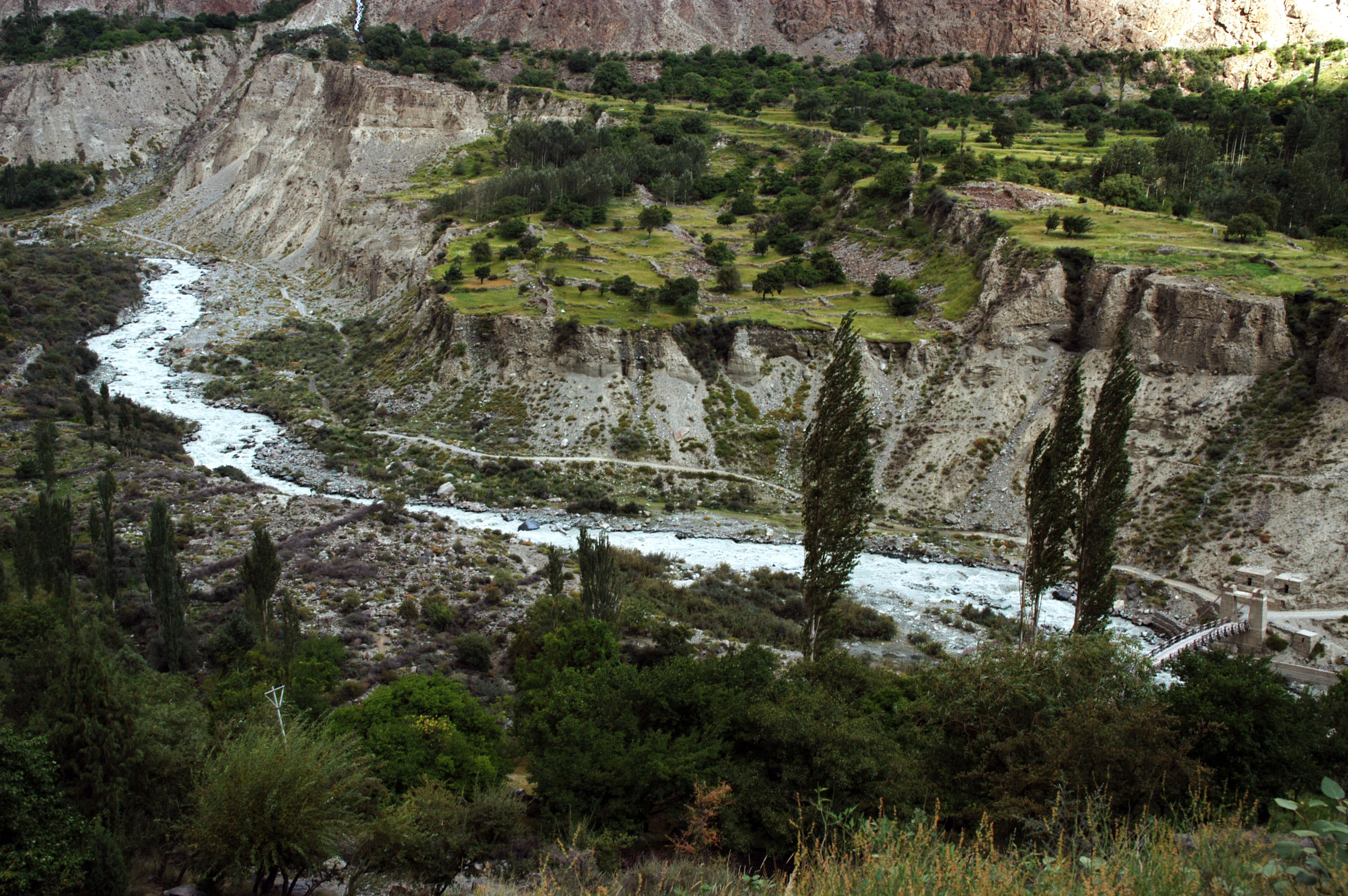
Bagrot Valley in Gilgit-Baltistan

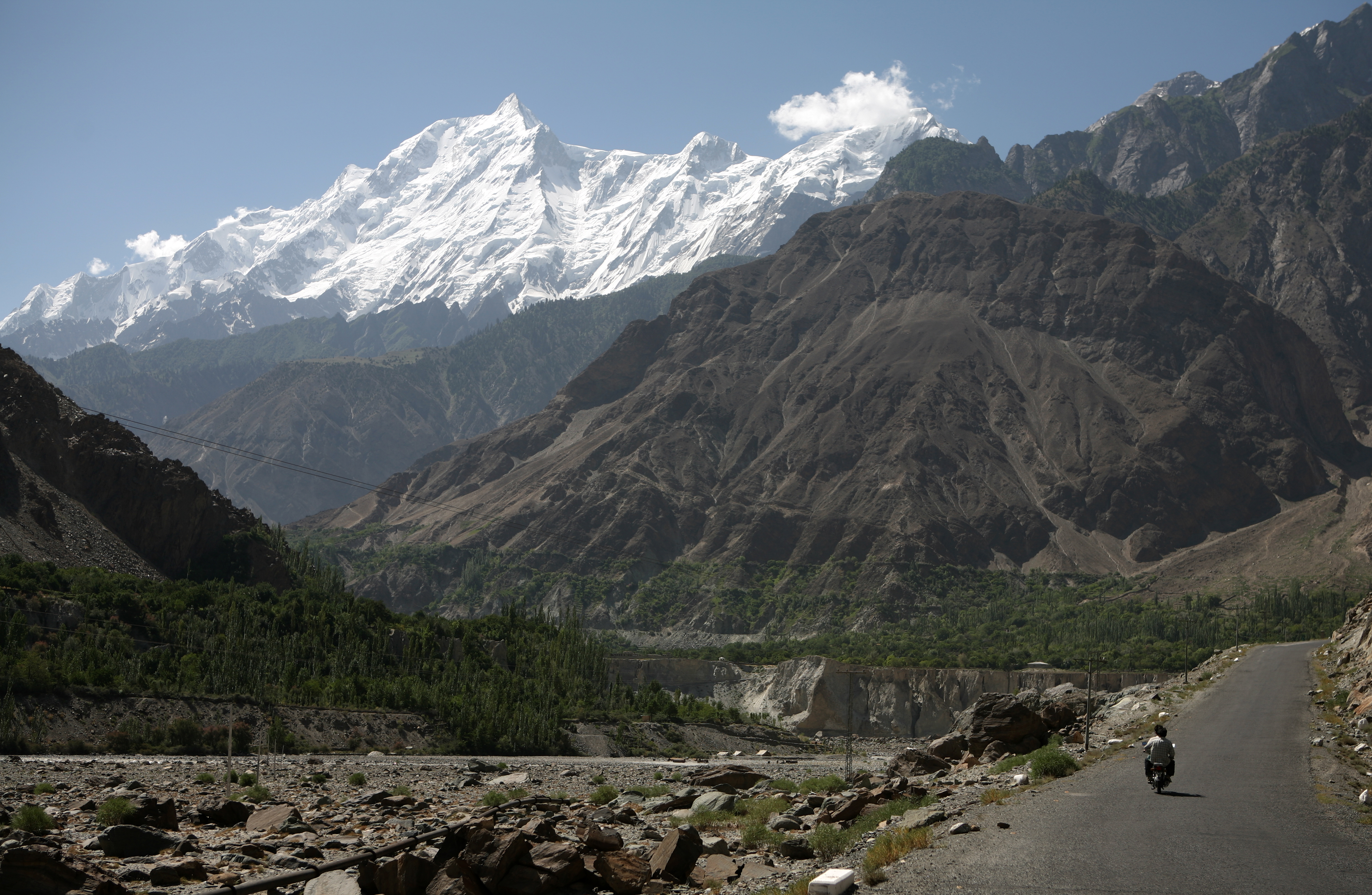
Hunza Valley in Gilgit-Baltistan and the west face of Rakaposhi

=== Astore District ===
- Domel Valley
- Gorikot Valley
- Rupal Valley
- Rama Valley
- Doian Valley
- Tarishing Valley

=== Darel District ===
- Darel Valley

=== Diamer District ===
- Khiner Valley
- Khanbari Valley
- Domot Valley
- Shatti Choi Valley
- Thor Valley

=== Gilgit District ===
- Bagrot Valley
- Dorchan Valley
- Gilgit Valley
- Haramosh Valley
- Nomal Valley
- Naltar Valley

=== Ghanche District ===
- Ghursay Valley
- Chorbat Valley
- Khaplu Valley
- Kharkoo Valley
- Kharfaq Valley
- Hushe Valley
- Thagus Valley

=== Ghizar District ===
- Buk Valley
- Handis Valley
- Hasis Valley
- Ishkoman Valley
- Karambar Valley
- Pakora Valley

=== Gupis-Yasin District ===
- Gupis Valley
- Yasin Valley
- Phander Valley
- Shandur Valley

=== Hunza District ===
- Avgarch Valley
- Boibar Valley
- Chapursan Valley
- Hunza Valley
- Kilik Valley
- Misgar Valley
- Mulangi Valley
- Shimshal Valley

=== Kharmang District ===
- Kharmang Valley
- Kunar Valley
- Shingo Valley

=== Nagar District ===
- Bar Valley
- Chalt Valley
- Chaprote Valley
- Daiter Valley
- Gapa Valley
- Hispar Valley
- Hopar Valley
- Nagar Valley

=== Roundu District ===
- Roundu Valley
- Tormik Valley
- Thorchay Valley
- Stak Valley
- Bilamik Valley
- Talubruq Valley
- Ganji Valley

=== Shigar District ===
- Shigar Valley

=== Skardu District ===
- Skardu Valley
- Basho Valley (Sultanabad Meadows)
- Thalay Valley
- Barah Valley

=== Tangir District ===
- Tangir Valley

== Azad Kashmir ==
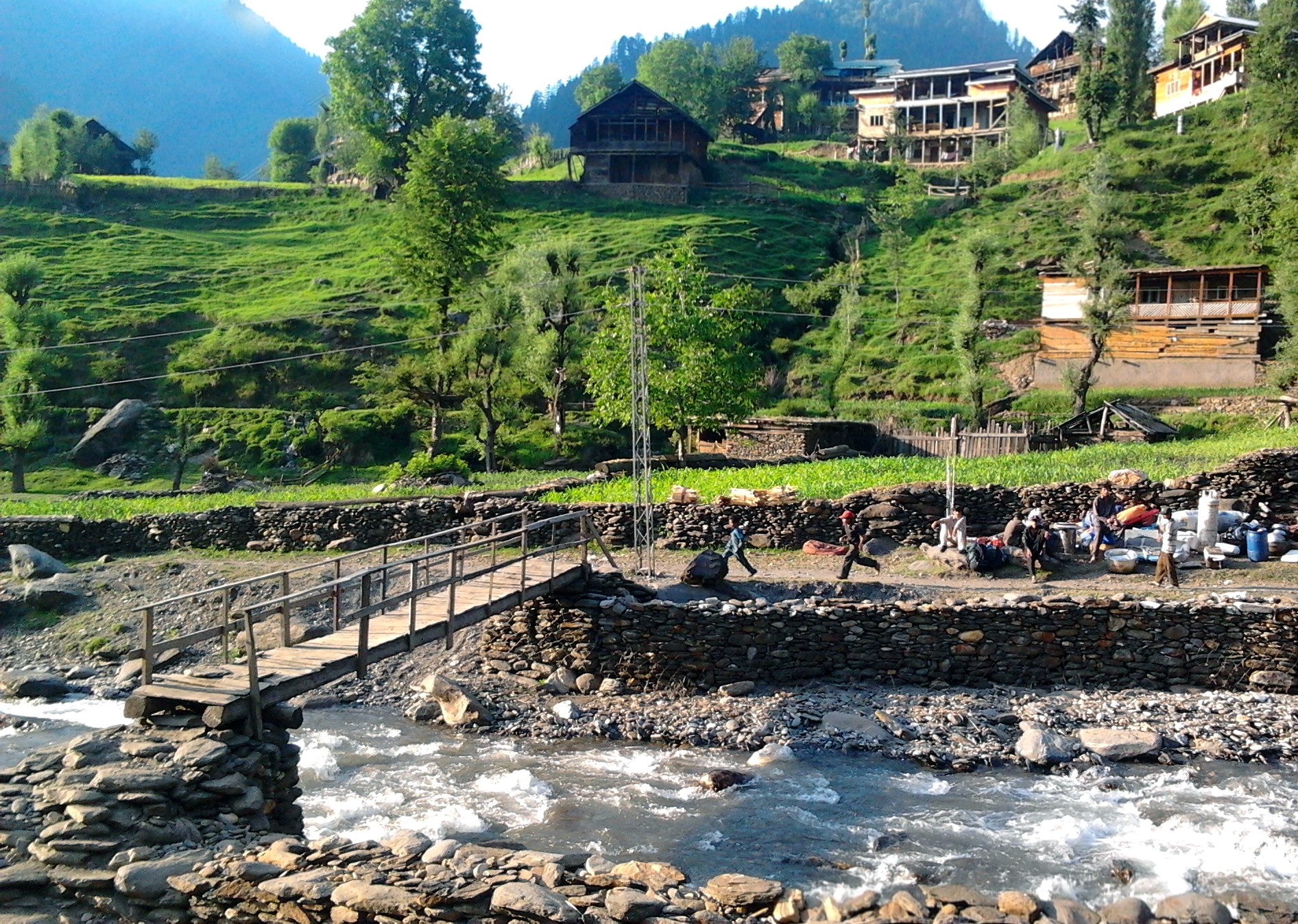
Neelum Valley in Azad Kashmir

- Bagh Valley
- Bandala Valley
- Jhelum Valley
- Kas Chanatar Valley
- Leepa Valley
- Neelam Valley
- Pathika Valley
- Samahni Valley
- Shounter Valley
- Banjosa Valley
- Bhana Valley

== Balochistan ==
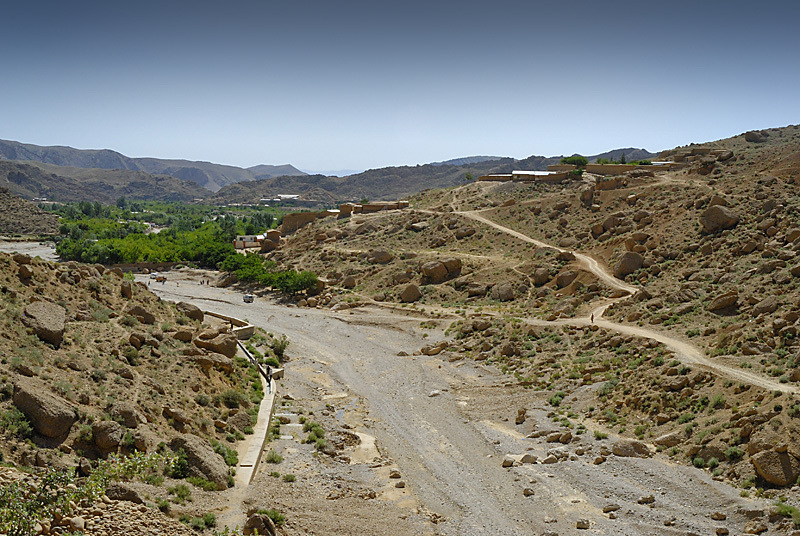
Urak Valley in Balochistan

=== Chaman District ===
- Chaman Valley

=== Khuzdar District ===
- Moola Valley

=== Quetta District ===
- Quetta Valley
- Urak Valley

== Punjab ==
=== Dera Gazi Khan District ===
- Phugla Valley

=== Khushab District ===
- Soon Valley

== Sindh ==
=== Dadu District ===
- Naig Valley

== See also ==
- Tourism in Pakistan
  - Hill Stations in Pakistan
  - Lakes of Pakistan
  - Waterfalls of Pakistan
