= Miandam =

- Union Council
- میاندام
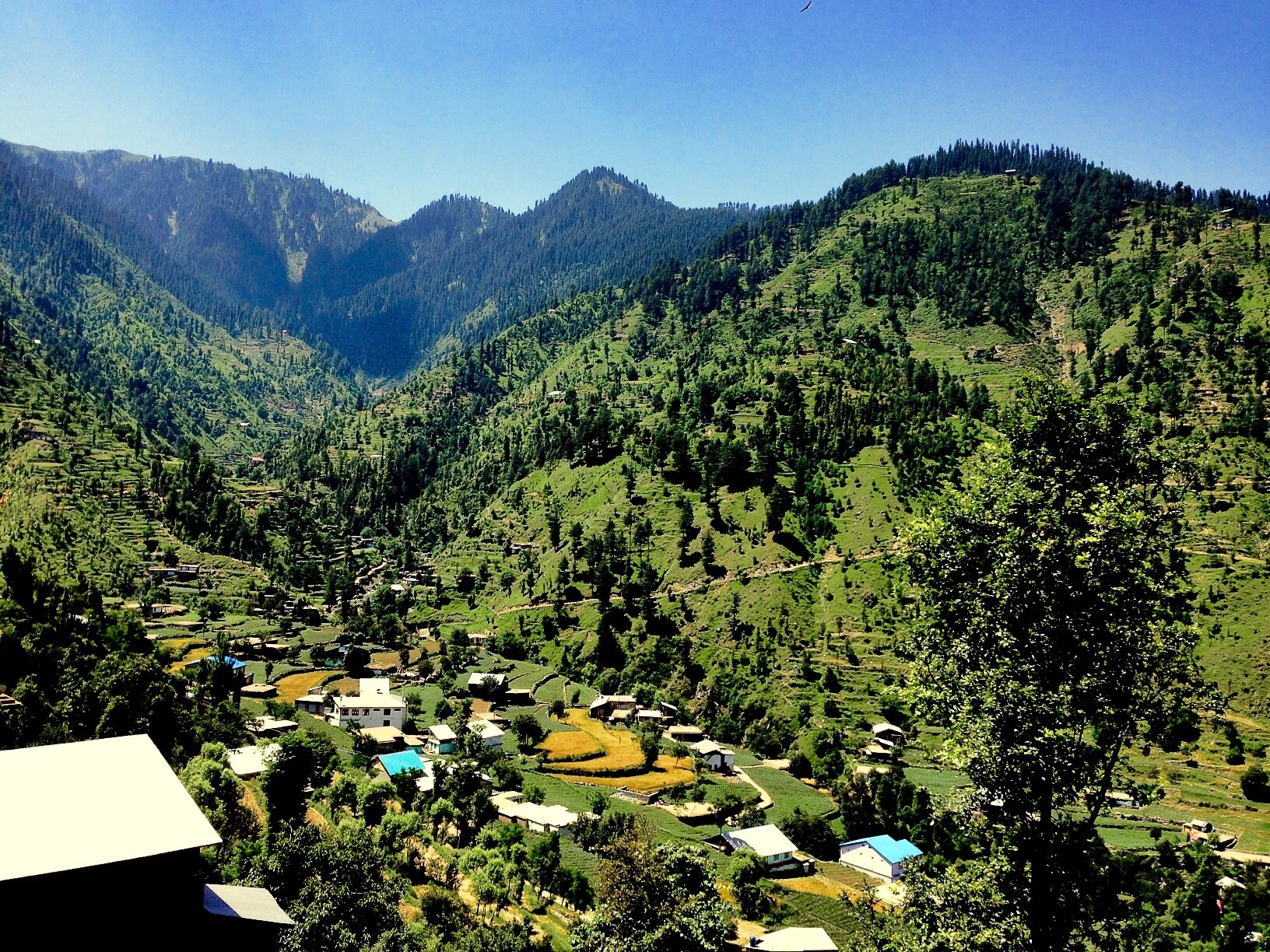
- Interactive map of Miandam
- Country: Pakistan
- Province: Khyber Pakhtunkhwa
- District: Upper Swat

Population (2017)
  - Total: 27,418
- Time zone: UTC+5 (PST)

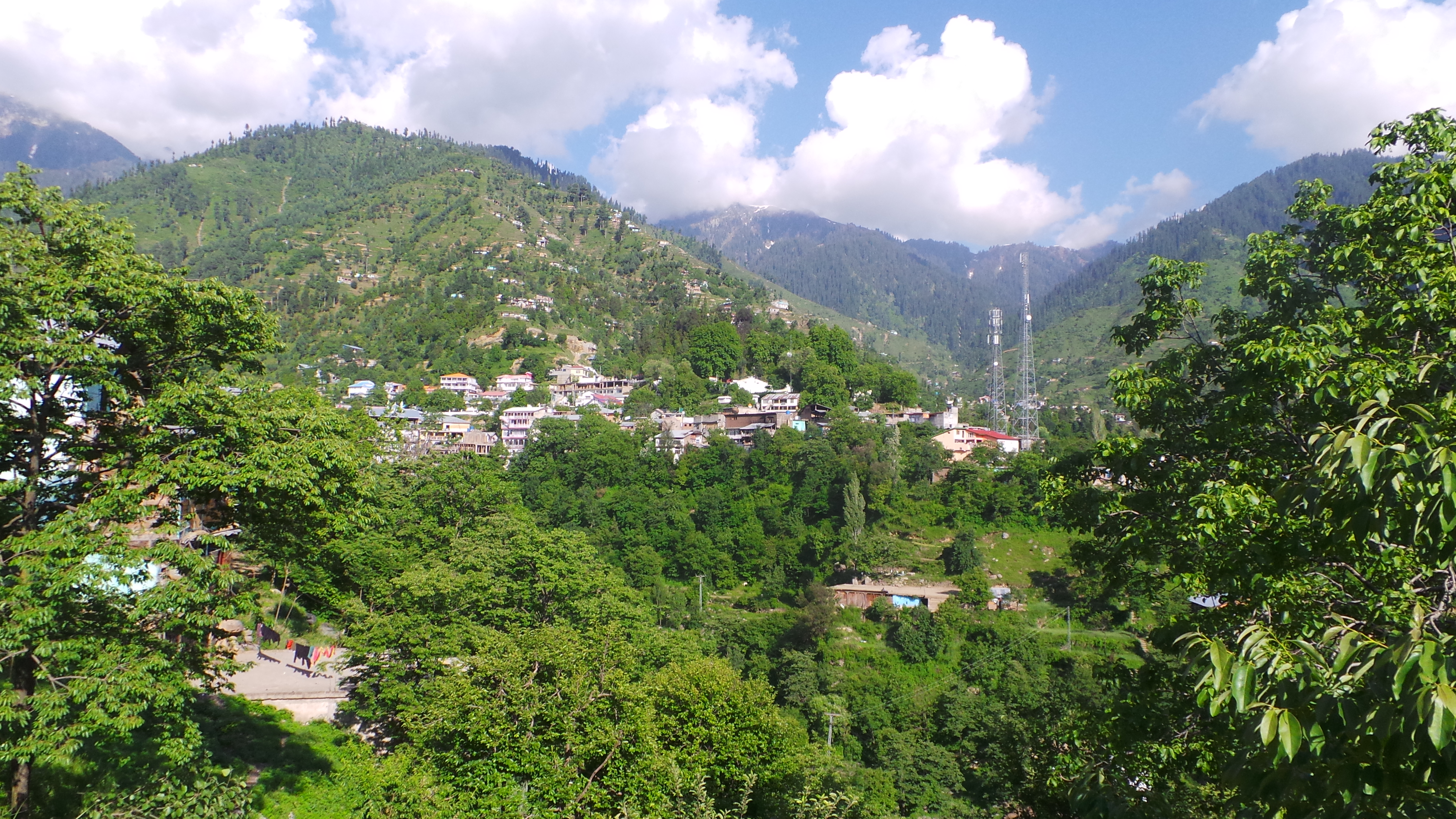
Miandam, swat valley

Miandam (also Miandam valley), is a hill station and union council in Khyber Pakhtunkhwa, Pakistan, in the foothills of Hindu Kush mountains. It is located at a distance of 55 km away from Mingora the capital of Swat Valley, and 56 kilometers (35 mi) from Saidu Sharif.

Miandam is enriched in medicinal plants, owing to which the town is the site of a World Wide Fund for Nature project promoting sustainable harvesting of medicinal plants, and now about 1,000 people are dependent on the medicinal plant trade for their entire income. The primary economy of the region is based on tourism and agriculture. While agriculture is mostly centered on corn and potatoes, As of 1988, its population was 3,000; but it is now estimated to be 20,000, including neighboring hamlets.

== Demographics ==
=== Ethnic groups ===
The major ethnic groups in Miandam are:

- Gujjar
- Yousafzai (Pashtun)

== See also ==
- Marghazar - Swat Valley
- Malam Jabba -Swat Valley
- Gabina Jabba - Swat Valley
- Madyan - Swat Valley
- Behrain - Swat Valley
- Kalam -Swat Valley
- Utror - Kalam Valley
- Usho - Swat Valley
- Gabral -Kalam Valley
