= Marghuzar =

Village in Swat, Pakistan

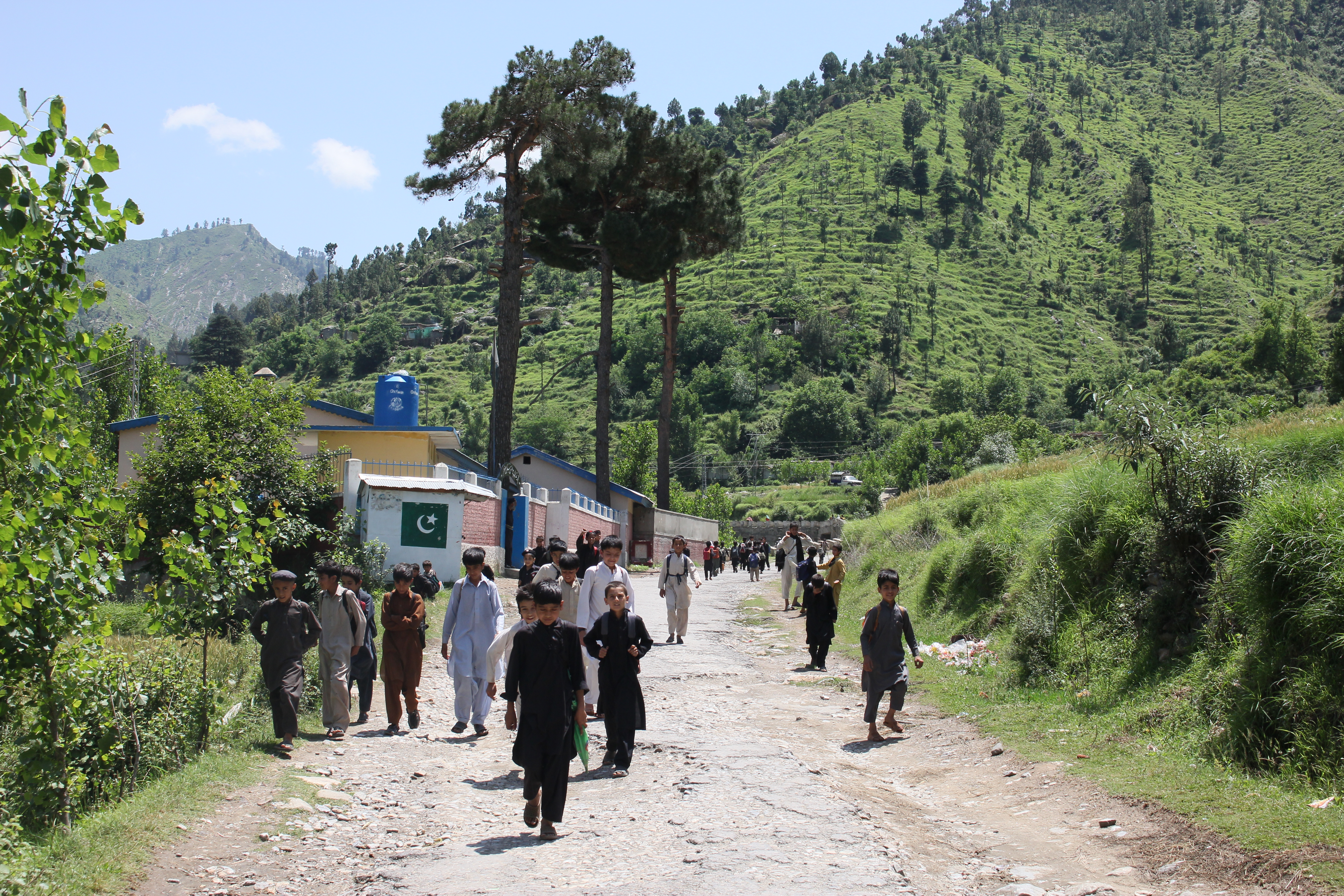
Marghazar village

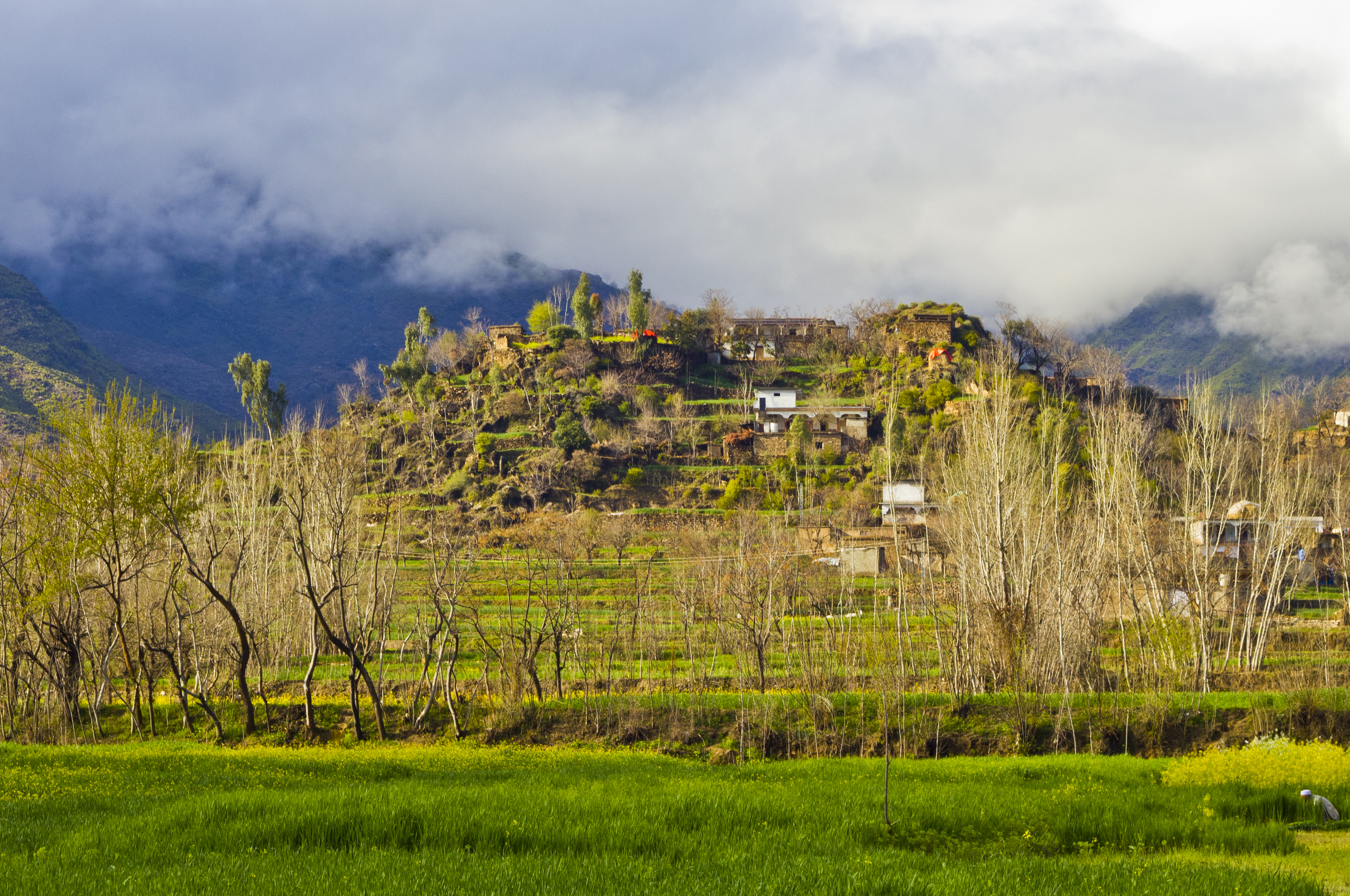
Spal Bandai, on the way to Marghuzar

Marghuzar, or Marghazar is a hill station located in the Swat District of the Khyber Pakhtunkhwa province of Pakistan, and is 13 kilometers away from Saidu Sharif. Marghuzar, translated as "green land", contains green valleys, cold springs, and mountains, including the Elum Ghar mountain. In 1940, the then Wali of Swat, Miangul Abdul Wadud, decided to build a summer residence there for himself which became the summer capital of Swat. The palace was named Sufed Mahal, translated as The White Palace. The palace has since been converted into a hotel. Marghuzar has a 200-year-old colossal chinar tree, which serves as a canopy for visitors. There is also a middle school and one primary school for boys and girls each, but there aren't any hospitals or clinics.

Queen Elizabeth II visited Marghuzar in 1961 and stayed there for three days.

== See also ==
- Miandam - Swat Valley
- Malam Jabba -Swat Valley
- Madyan - Swat Valley
- Behrain - Swat Valley
- Kalam -Swat Valley
- Utror - Kalam Valley
- Usho - Kalam Valley
- Gabral -Kalam Valley

== See also ==
- White Palace (Marghazar)
- Swat District
