= Badgoi Pass =

Mountain Pass in Pakistan

Coordinates: 35.49389°N 72.36146°E

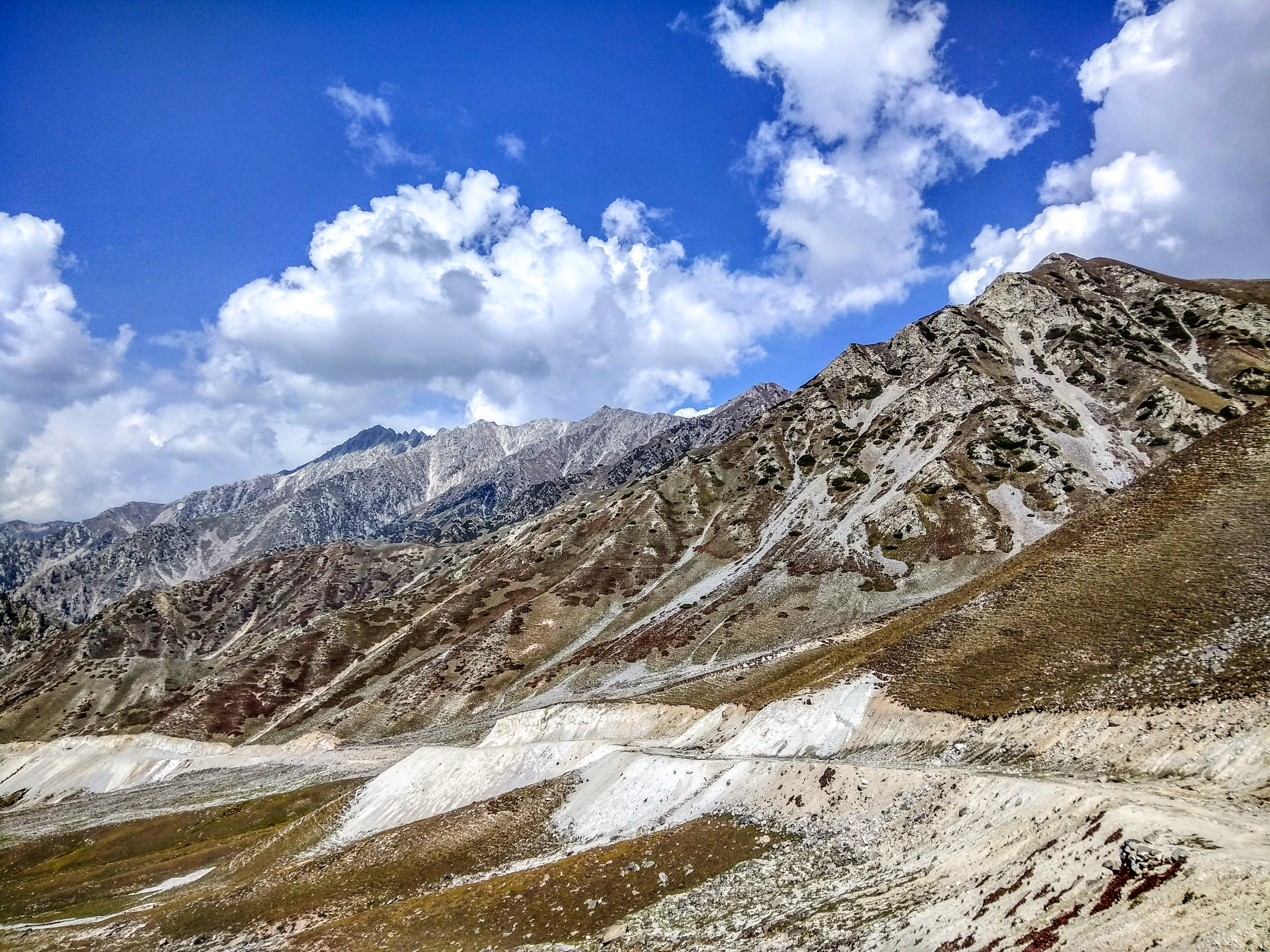
Badogai Pass

Badgoi or Badogai, also known as Badawi, is a mountain pass that connects the Kumrat Valley of Upper Dir District with Utror and Kalam Valleys of Upper Swat District in Khyber Pakhtunkhwa, Pakistan. The high mountain pass is located at 3,523m above sea level.

The rugged road to the summit, also known as Do Teer Pass, Badgoi Pass, and Badogai Pass, is entirely unpaved, locally called Utrar-Dir Road. Stretching 26.53 miles and running west-east from Kalkot to Utror, the winter snow renders Badawi impassable from November through June.
