= Matiltan Hydropower Project =

Matiltan Hydropower Project is a proposed run-of-the-river hydro-power generation project which is located in the Gorkin Matiltan region of Kalam valley, District Swat, Khyber Pakhtunkhwa province of Pakistan, on the left tributary of Suvastu River. The power station has a planned generating capacity of 84 MW.

== Construction ==
In October 2020, the project was estimated to be 47 percent complete.
