= Kalam Summer Festival =

Festival in Swat, Pakistan

- Genre: Summer Festival, Cultural Festival
- Dates: July – August
- Frequency: Annually
- Locations: Kalam, Swat, Khyber Pakhtunkhwa, Pakistan
- Coordinates: 35.48305449779945°N 72.5850107825926°E
- Years active: 2010–present
- Founders: Khyber Pakhtunkhwa Tourism Corporation
- Website: Official Website

Kalam Festival, Kalam Mela, or Swat Summer Festival is a cultural and recreational event held every year in July or August in the scenic valley of Kalam and Mahodand, 100 kilometers from Mingora, in the Khyber Pakhtunkhwa province of Pakistan.

The festival is arranged in the style of the Shandur Polo Festival. In the summer days, when the plain areas of Pakistan are hot and humid, tourists travel north to enjoy the cold weather in Kalam and the tent village in Mahodand. The Khyber Pakhtunkhwa Tourism Department organizes the festival in collaboration with the Pakistan Army. Sports, cultural and recreational activities are arranged during the week.

== Background ==
To promote tourism and celebrate restoration of peace in Swat valley after three years of militancy (2007–2009), the first summer festival was organized in 2010 by the joint venture of the Pakistan Army and Swat Hotels Association in collaboration with the Provincial Reconstruction, Rehabilitation and Resettlement Authority (PaRRSA). Since then, the festival is organized regularly in the months of July or August.

== Activities at the festival ==
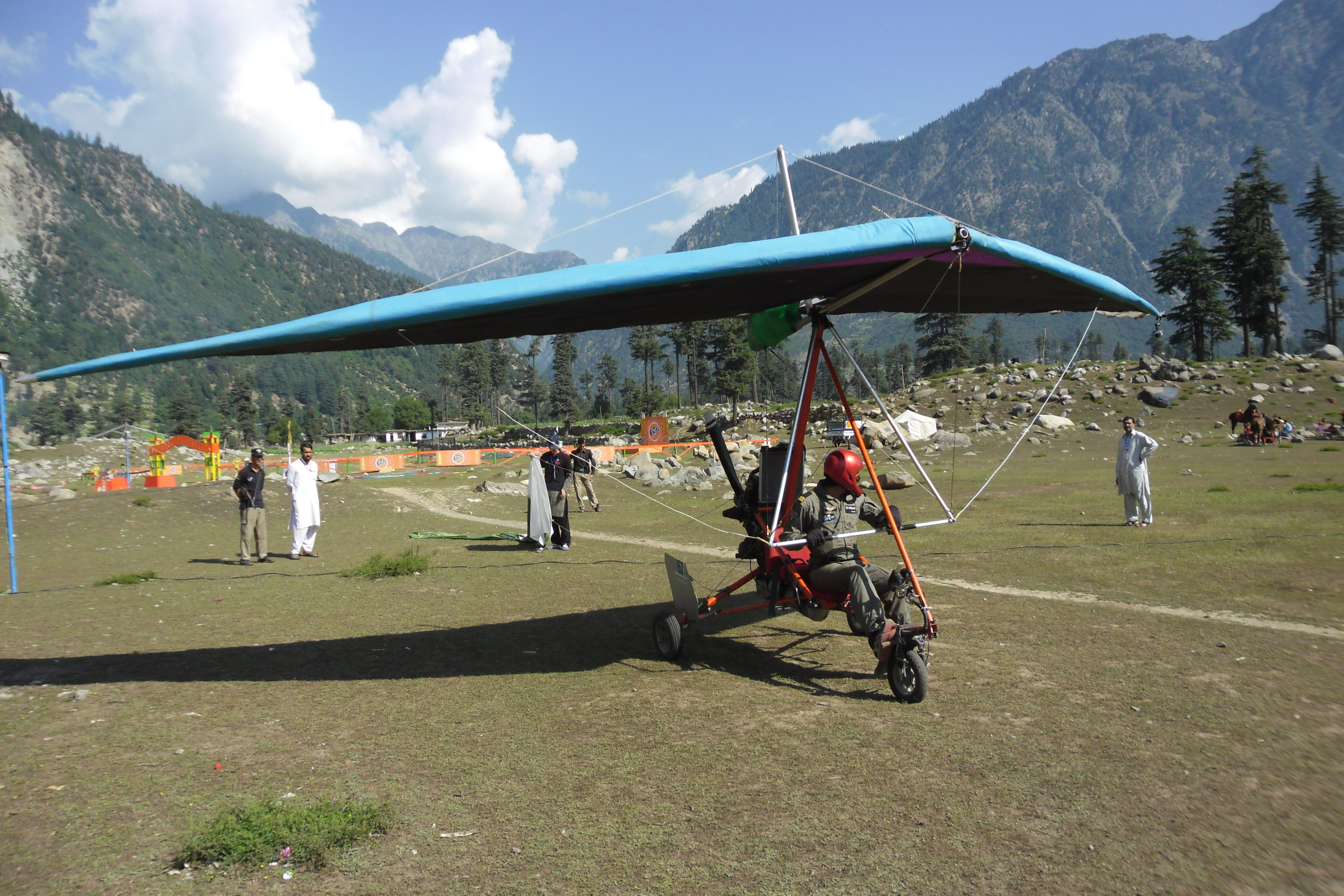
A Paraglider is ready to fly in Kalam festival

To provide recreation to the participants, multiple activities are arranged during the week-long festival. Paragliding, handicraft display, jeep rally, cycling, canoeing, cultural shows, and music concerts are organized during the festival. Traditional Khattak dance, horse dance, Chitral dance, and regional dances are also part of the festival.

== Importance of the event ==
A large number of tourists from across Pakistan and abroad attend the festival. In 2012, about 0.5 million tourists visited Swat Summer Festival. This number will increase in the coming years. The Head of State or provincial head are the chief guests in the opening and concluding ceremony. In 2015, the then Chief Minister of Khyber Pakhtunkhwa Pervez Khattak and Chief of Army Staff General Raheel Sharif attended the festival.
