= Matiltan =

Coordinates: 35.542°N 72.661°E

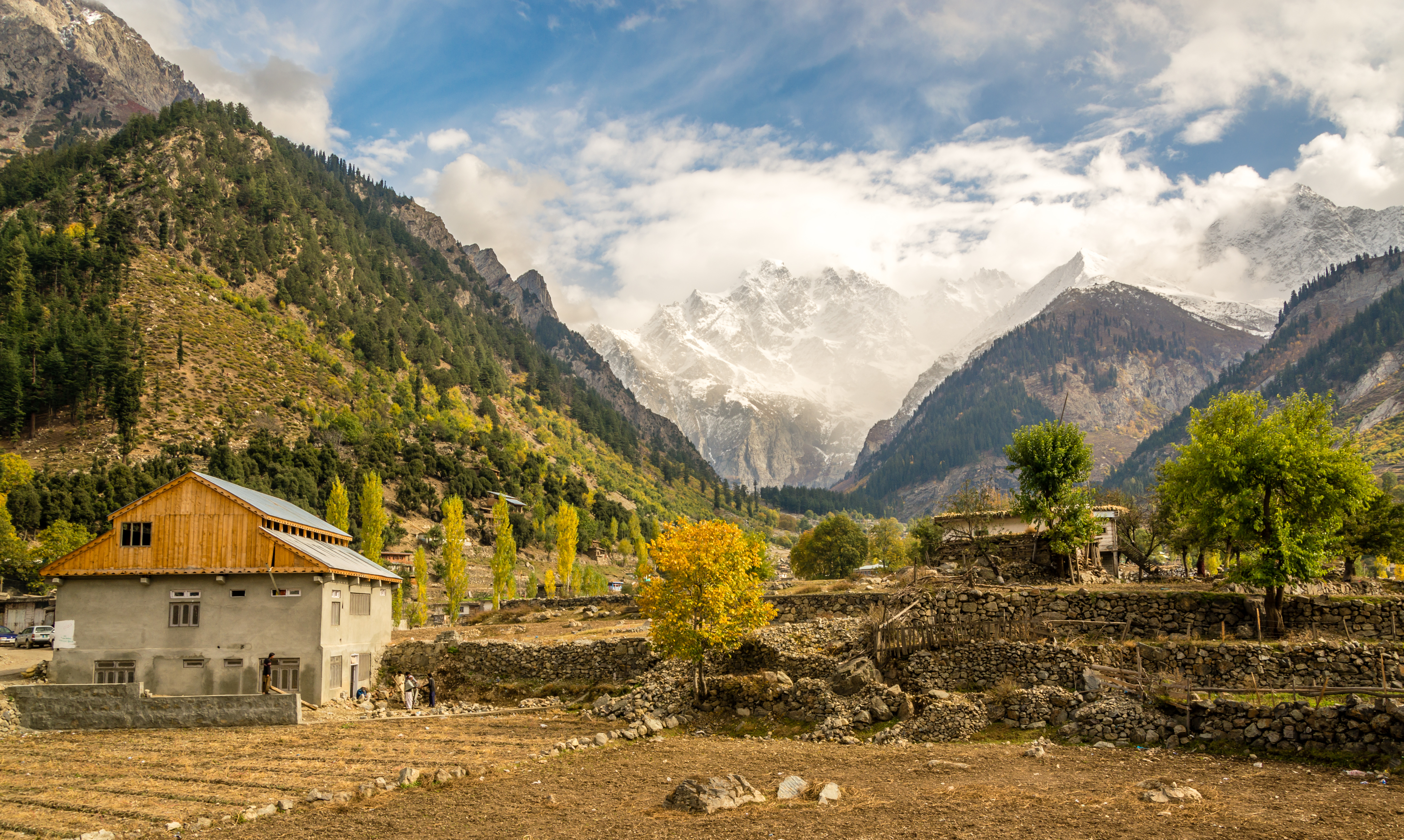
Matiltan, Kalam Valley

Matiltan is a village in the Usho Valley in Pakistan about 11 km away from Kalam. The valley has large glaciers, thick forests and lofty mountain peaks. It is home to 84 MW Matiltan Hydropower Plant. The tallest peak of Swat, Falak Sar can be viewed from it. It is accessible through a non-metalled road from Kalam by a four-wheel drive vehicle and the lake of Mahodand comes after this village of Kalam. Matiltan is predominantly populated by Gawri people.

== See also ==
- Usho
- Utror
- Gabral, Kohistan
- Mahodand Lake
