= Phugla =

Phugla Valley وادی فگلا
- Valley
- Location in Pakistan
- Coordinates: 30°38′N 70°19′E
- Country: Pakistan
- Province: Punjab
- District: Dera Ghazi Khan

Population (2017)
  - Total: 33,522
- Time zone: UTC+5 (PST)

Phugla Valley is a small valley near Taunsa Sharif in Dera Ghazi Khan District of Punjab the province of Pakistan. It is located near the border of Balochistan Province. The valley is divided into two major parts; Northern Phugla and Southern Phugla by a stream. The residents of Phugla are Baloch tribes, mainly the Qaisrani.

== See also ==
- List of valleys in Pakistan
