= Kas Chanatar =

Kas Chanatar Kuschanātar
- Hill Station
- Location within Azad Kashmir
- Coordinates: 32°57′56″N 74°07′31″E
- Country: Pakistan
- Territory: Azad Kashmir
- Division: Mirpur
- District: Bhimber
- Tehsil: Bhimber
- Elevation: 390 m (1,280 ft)

Population (2017)
  - Total: 342,900

Languages
  - Official: Urdu, English
  - Regional: Pothwari
- Time zone: UTC+5:00 (PKT)
- Postal code: 10040

Kas Chanatar (Urdu: کس چناتر, romanized: Kas Chanātar) is a valley and hill station located near Bhimber City, Pakistan. Various villages are scattered around the valley with farmlands and cottages. Kas Chanatar lies at the low foothills of the Himalayan ranges along the Randeam Kas and Chanar stream bordering the plains of upper Punjab.

== Geography ==
Villages occupy both sides. The relatively low lying foothills of the Himalayan ranges have been adapted to grow crops such as corn and wheat. The valley lies at an average elevation of 390 meters. A stream flows between the valley during monsoon. The animals located in this valley include jackals, wild pigs, eagles, goats, buffalo and crows.

Nearby villages include Bhimber (1.9 km west), Makahal (2.03 km south west), Khamb (2.08 km west), Potosial (2.14 km north), Dharian (2.39 km north west). Other villages include:

- Gurah Mehran
- Chini Dakki
- Gurah Chadian
- Gurah Nala
- Gurah Bagh
- Gurah Naka
- Gurah Thothal
- Gurah Mughlaan
- Gurah Kalai
- Gurah Khaibrian
- Gurah Dairi
- Gurah Kanjal
- Chatta
- Gurah Jhandi

== Economy ==
Most of the villagers rely on home grown produce to survive. Crops include corn and wheat.

== Infrastructure ==
Electricity, phone service and television arrived in the early twenty-first century.

Chanatar Kas is a stream located in the area.

== Demographics ==
A 10 square kilometres (3.9 sq mi) area around Kas Chanatar has an approximate population of 342900 (0.003429 persons per square meter)

== History ==
Mughal remains can be seen throughout the valley. Mughal Emperors ruled these lands. Walls made by them using stones are the most significant remains seen in this area.

== Caste ==
Jatts are 99% of the population. Other castes are mainly Butt and Rajputt.
