= Shaikhdara =

Pakistani

Shaikhdara Shaikh Dara
- Locality/Neighbourhood
- Urdu: شیخ درہ
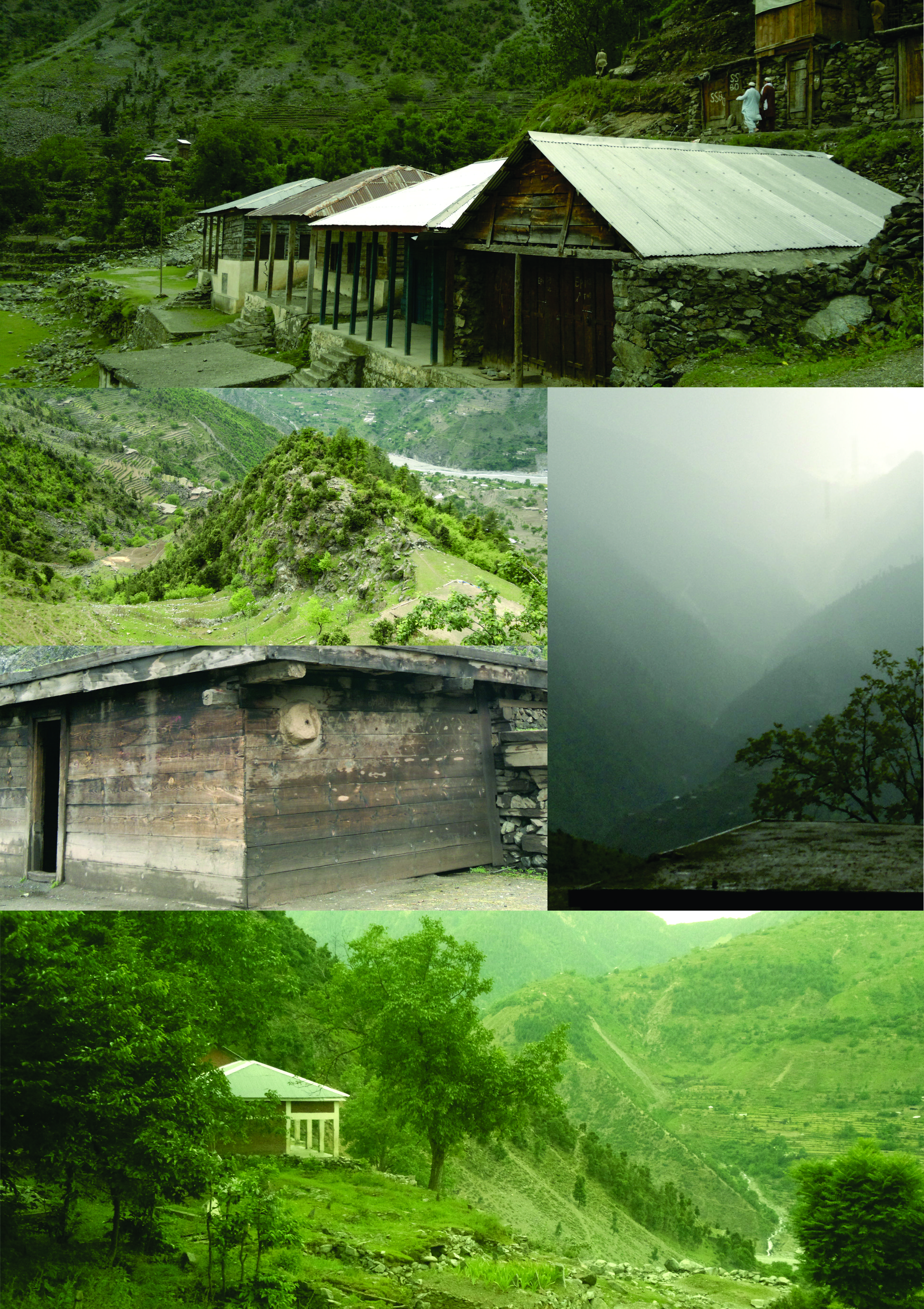
- From top to down clockwise: GPS Peeranokilay, beautiful view of mountains from Bhoin, proposed Middle School for boys Shaikhdara, typical house at Bhoin Shaikhdara, Dongue mountain Shaikhdara

- Location within Pakistan
- Coordinates: 35°08′51″N 72°55′28″E
- Country: Pakistan
- Province: Khyber Pakhtunkhwa
- District: Lower Kohistan
- Tehsil: Pattan
- U/C: Dubair Bala
- Elevation: 2,100 m (6,900 ft)
- Highest elevation: 2,800 m (9,200 ft)
- Lowest elevation: 1,480 m (4,860 ft)

Population (April 2012)
  - Total: 2,500
- Time zone: UTC+5 (PST)
- Area code: 0998
- Website: shaikhdara.synthasite.com

Shaikhdara [ʃeːxd̪ərə] or Shaikh Dara [ˈʃeːxˈd̪ərə] (Pashto: شیخ درہ, Urdu: شیخ درہ) is the most popular locality of Union Council Dubair Bala in Lower Kohistan District of Khyber-Pakhtunkhwa province of Pakistan.

== Language ==
Language spoken here is primarily one of the Dardic language Indus Kohistani Maiya locally known as Abasin Kohistani or Kohiste while some researchers called it Maiyã (Mayon) or Shuthun but these names are not known locally. It is very similar to Torwali language that is spoken in Bahrain and Chail Swat.

== Topography ==
As it is hilly area and surrounded by mountains with elevations and depressions at different places thus the highest elevation from sea level is about 2,800 m at "Zaid sar" a place in 'Takki' and lowest elevation 1480m at 'Kothal'. Total area occupied is 3.818 km2 (1.474 sq mi).
