= Gupis, Gilgit-Baltistan =

Town in Gilgit-Baltistan, Pakistan

Coordinates: 36°14′N 73°27′E

Gupis is a small town in Ghizer Valley on the banks of Gilgit River in Ghizer District, Gilgit-Baltistan, Pakistan. Gupis is located 2176 meters above sea level at latitude 36°13'46.82" and longitude 73°26'40.49" about 112 kilometers to the west of Gilgit. The Gupis Fort was built in 1894. This fort was once used for defence purposes. The Khalti Lake is at a 20–30 minutes drive from Gupis. It is well-known for being the habitat of trout fish. The lake was formed due to stretch of river near the village of Khalti.
