= Gabral Valley =

Valley in Swat Kohistan, Pakistan

Gabral
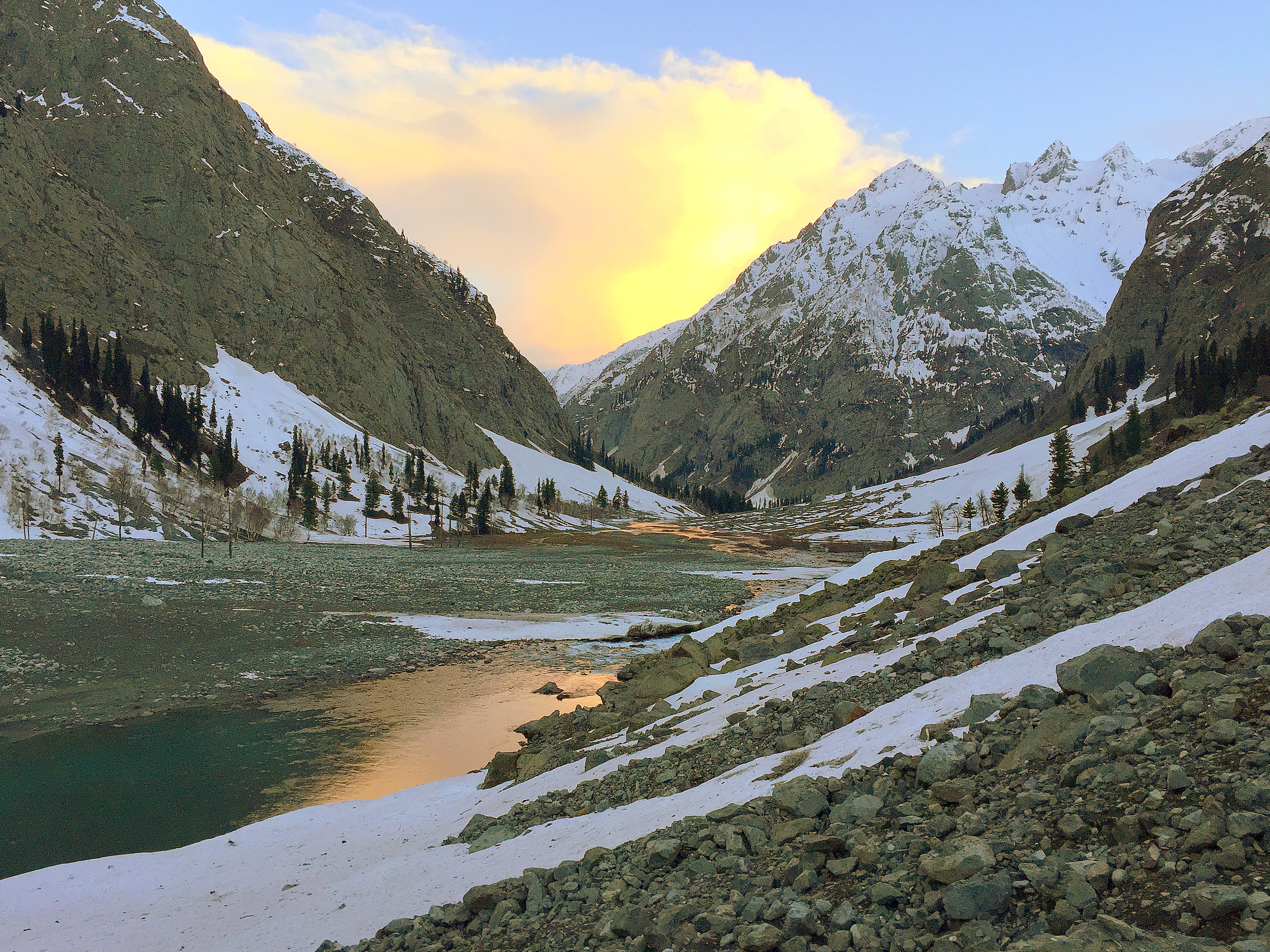
- Gabral Valley, in Swat Kohistan, approaching Lake Kharkhari

- Location within Khyber Pakhtunkhwa province Location within Pakistan
- Coordinates: 35.68°N 72.40°E
- Country: Pakistan
- Province: Khyber Pakhtunkhwa
- District: Swat District
- Tehsil: Behrain Tehsil

The Gabral Valley (from Gawri gha lit. 'small valley where stream flows') is a valley in the Upper Swat District of Khyber Pakhtunkhwa, Pakistan. It is located in the south slopes of the westernmost end of the Himalayas. Its lower end is at the town of Gabral, about 20 km north (by road) from Kalam and 120 km north of Islamabad, at an altitude of 2290 m. The valley covers about 38,733 hectares (387.33 km^{2}).

The main part of the valley extends for about 38 km northwards of the town of Gabral. Its highest end is at 35.84°N 72.48°E, about 6 km east of the peak of the Kharakali (or Kakhari; 5871 m). The Swat River officially begins at Kalam through the direct confluence of the Gabral River and the Ushu River. Hundreds of houses are scattered through the southernmost 7 km of the valley, but some farms are seen for the next 7–8 km. A road runs parallel to the river for about 14 km, until 2 km below Lake Kharkhari.

== Demographics ==
The Gujars are the main ethnic group in Gabral Valley. Kohistani people, mainly Gawris and Torwalis, also inhabit the valley.

== Flora and fauna ==
The natural resources of the region include several medicinal herbs that are collected for local use and export.

== Kharkhari Lake ==
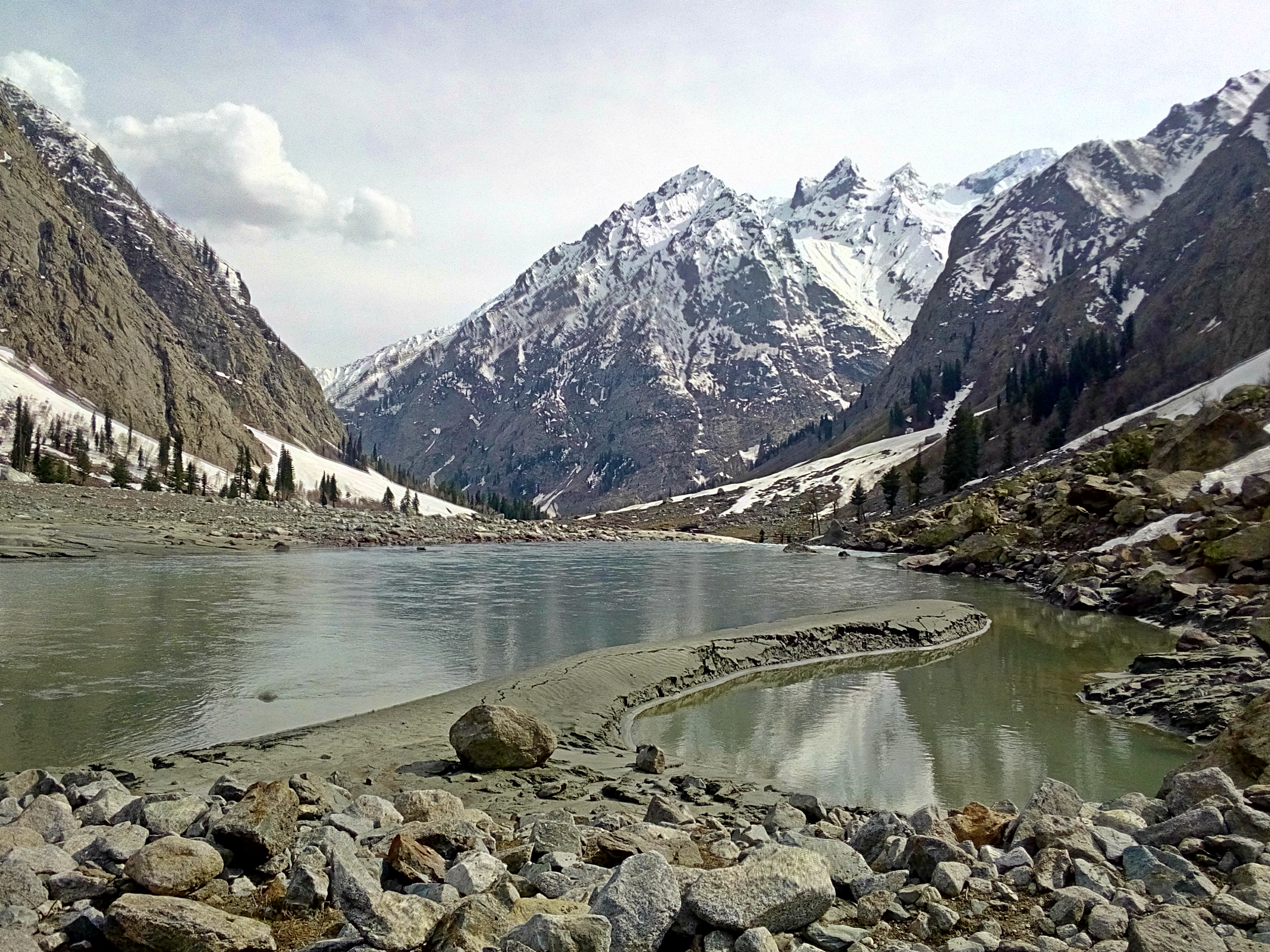
Kharkhari lake in Gabral Valley

Kharkhari (also spelled Karkaray) is a small lake in Gabral Valley, about 400 m long and 250 m wide. It is traversed by the Gabral River. It is located about 41 km by road from the town of Kalam, 16 km north of the town of Gabral and 9 km north of the Gul Bandaj bridge, at an altitude of 5160 meters.
