= Swat River =

Swat River سوات
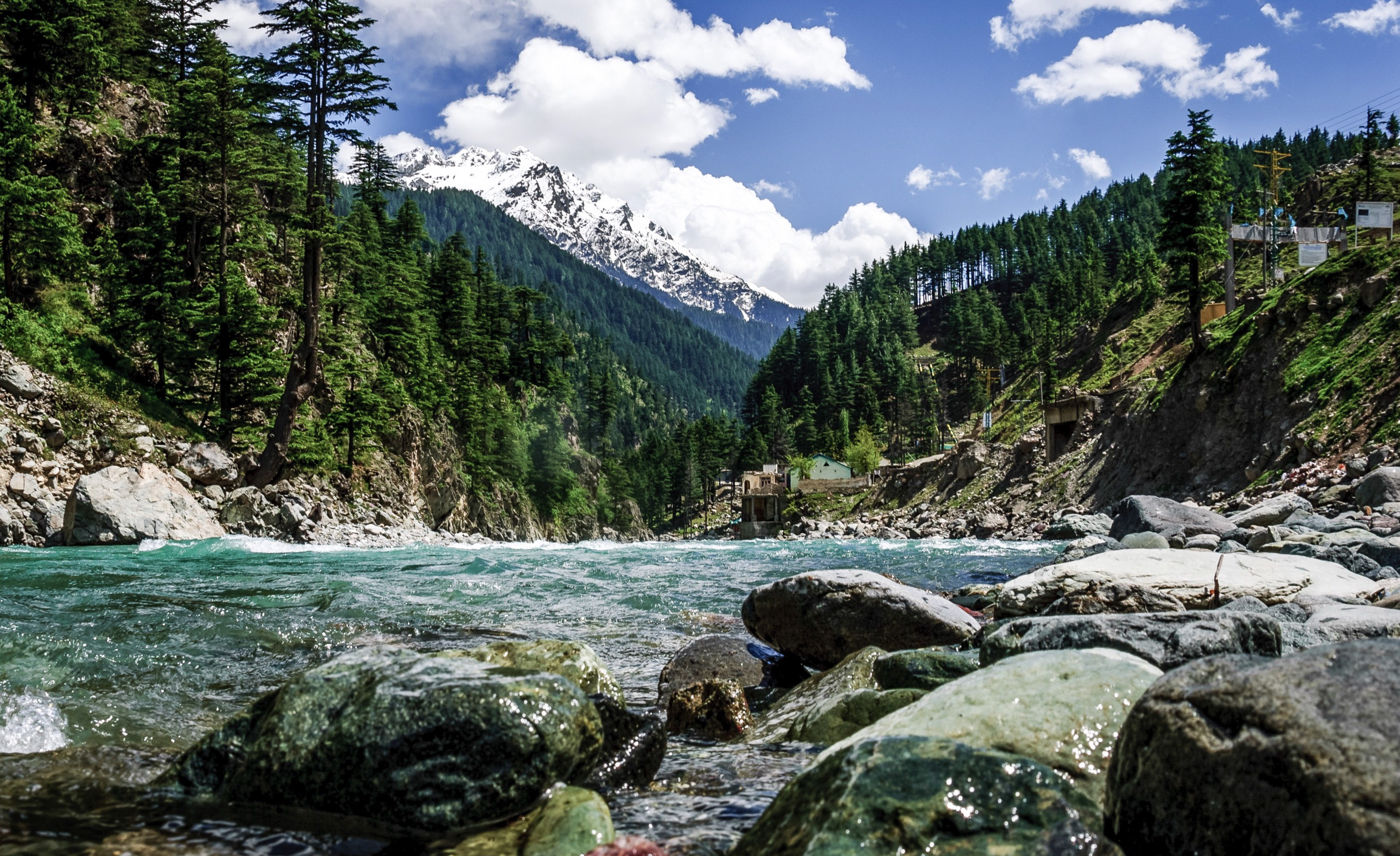

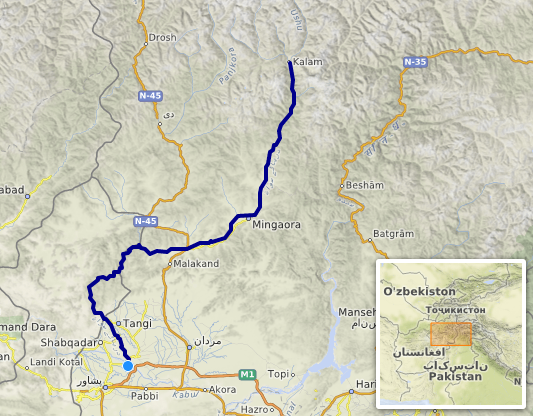
- Course of the Swat (interactive map)

Location
- Country: Pakistan
- Province: Khyber Pakhtunkhwa
- District: Swat

Physical characteristics
- Source: Hindu Kush Mountains
- Source confluence: Usho and Gabral rivers
  - location: Kalam
- Mouth: Kabul River
  - location: Charsadda
  - coordinates: 34°07′21″N 71°42′41″E
- Length: 240 km (150 mi)
- Basin size: 13,000 km^{2} (5,000 sq mi)
- Discharge
  - location: Munda
  - average: 280 cubic m/s

Basin features
- Progression: Kabul→ Indus→ Arabian Sea
- Tributaries
  - left: Ushu Khwar, Bashigram Khwar
  - right: Daral Khwar, Gabral Khwar

The Swat River (Urdu: دریائے سوات, Pashto: سوات سیند) is a perennial river in the northern region of the Khyber Pakhtunkhwa province of Pakistan. The source of river is in the high glacial valleys of the Hindu Kush mountains, from where it then flows into the Kalam Valley before forming the spine of the wider Swat Valley.

== Etymology ==
The word Swat comes from the Sanskrit name Suvāstu which means "clear blue water." Another theory derives the word Swat from the Sanskrit word shveta (lit. 'white'), also used to describe the clear water of the Swat River. To the ancient Greeks, the river was known as the Soastus. The Chinese pilgrim Faxian referred to Swat as the Su-ho-to.

== Course ==
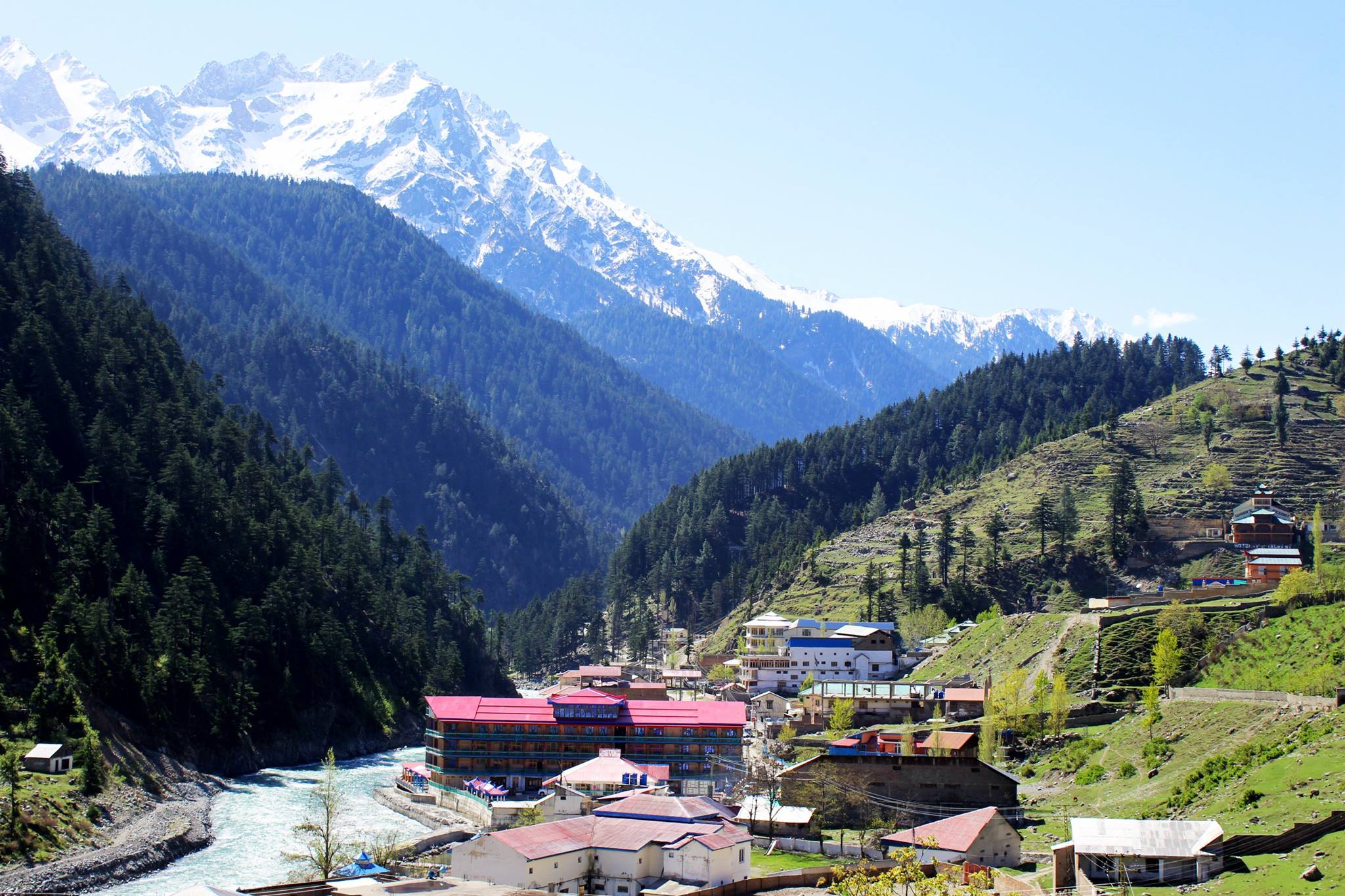
Upper reaches of the Swat River in the Kalam Valley

The source of Swat River lies in the Hindu Kush mountains, from where it is fed by glacial waters throughout the year. From the high valleys of Swat Kohistan, the river begins at the confluence of the Usho, and Gabral rivers (also known as the Utrar River) at Kalam. From the confluence, the Swat river flows through the narrow gorges of the Kalam Valley until the city of Madyan. From there, the river courses gently for 160 km (99 mi) through the plain areas of the lower Swat Valley until Chakdara. In the extreme southern end of the Swat valley, the river enters a narrow gorge and joins the Panjkora River, at Qalangi before entering the Peshawar Valley. It finally terminates in Kabul River, near Charsadda.

== Hydrology ==
The mean annual discharge of Swat River is 280 m^{3}/s (9,900 cu ft/s) near Munda Gauging Station. It is a major tributary of Kabul River.

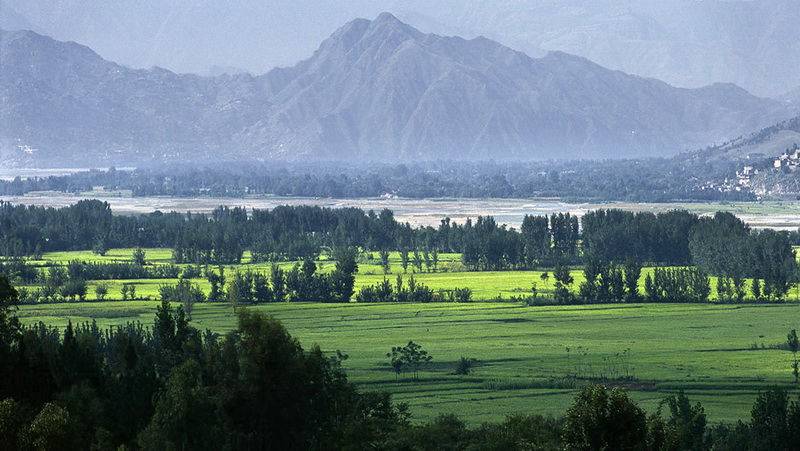
Lower reaches of the Swat River valley

Swat River plays an important role in the economy of the valley. Lower reaches of Swat and Malakand are irrigated by a series of canals regulated by the Amandara Headworks, built by the British in 1903.

The Upper Swat Canal flows under the Malakand Pass through Benton Tunnel, completed in 1914. Below Dargai, the Munda Headworks, built by the British in 1921, feed canals that supply numerous smaller canals in the districts of Charsadda, Swabi and Mardan in the Peshawar Valley. The river also recharges water wells and springs through seepage.

=== Hydropower ===
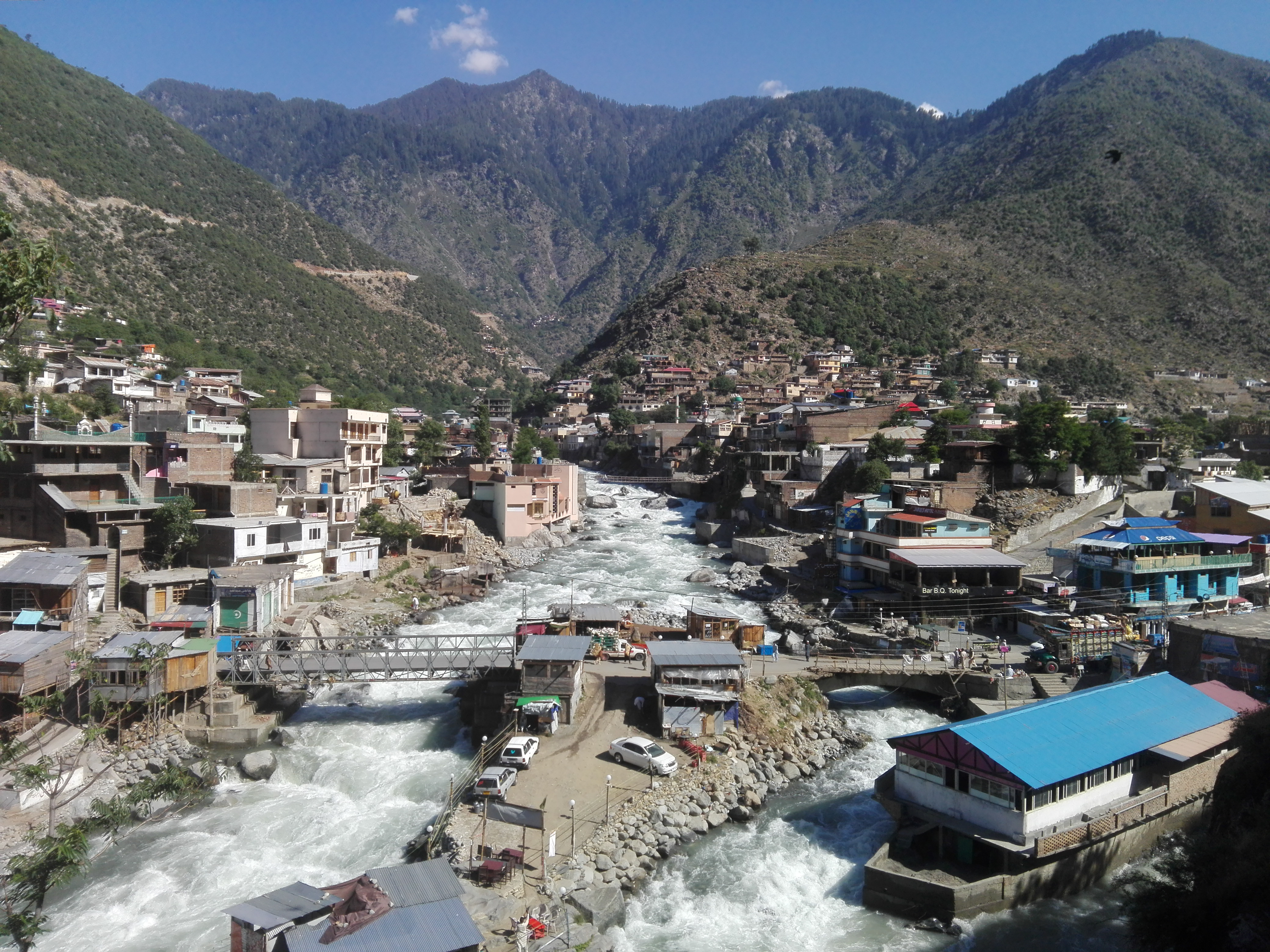
The town of Bahrain, built along the river

Swat River are used for hydropower generation at the Jabban Hydropower Plant (completed in 1938), and Dargai Hydropower Plant (completed in 1952). The Mohmand Dam, at the lower end of the Swat River's course before it enters into the Peshawar valley, has an installed generation capacity of 740 MW and is under construction. Proposed hydropower projects along the river's course are Asrit Kedam HPP, Gabral HPP, and Matiltan HPP.

=== Environmental issues ===
Unregulated sand and gravel mining has degraded the Swat River, transforming its natural course and increasing its deadliness, particularly during floods. Excessive extraction creates deep pits and alters the riverbed, leading to accelerated bank erosion and the destruction of vital aquatic habitats, impacting fish species like trout. The disturbed sediment also pollutes the water, affecting both aquatic ecosystems and human communities reliant on the river for drinking and irrigation. This exacerbates flood risk, as the altered river morphology becomes less capable of safely accommodating high water flows, leading to increased damage to infrastructure and loss of life.

== Tourism ==
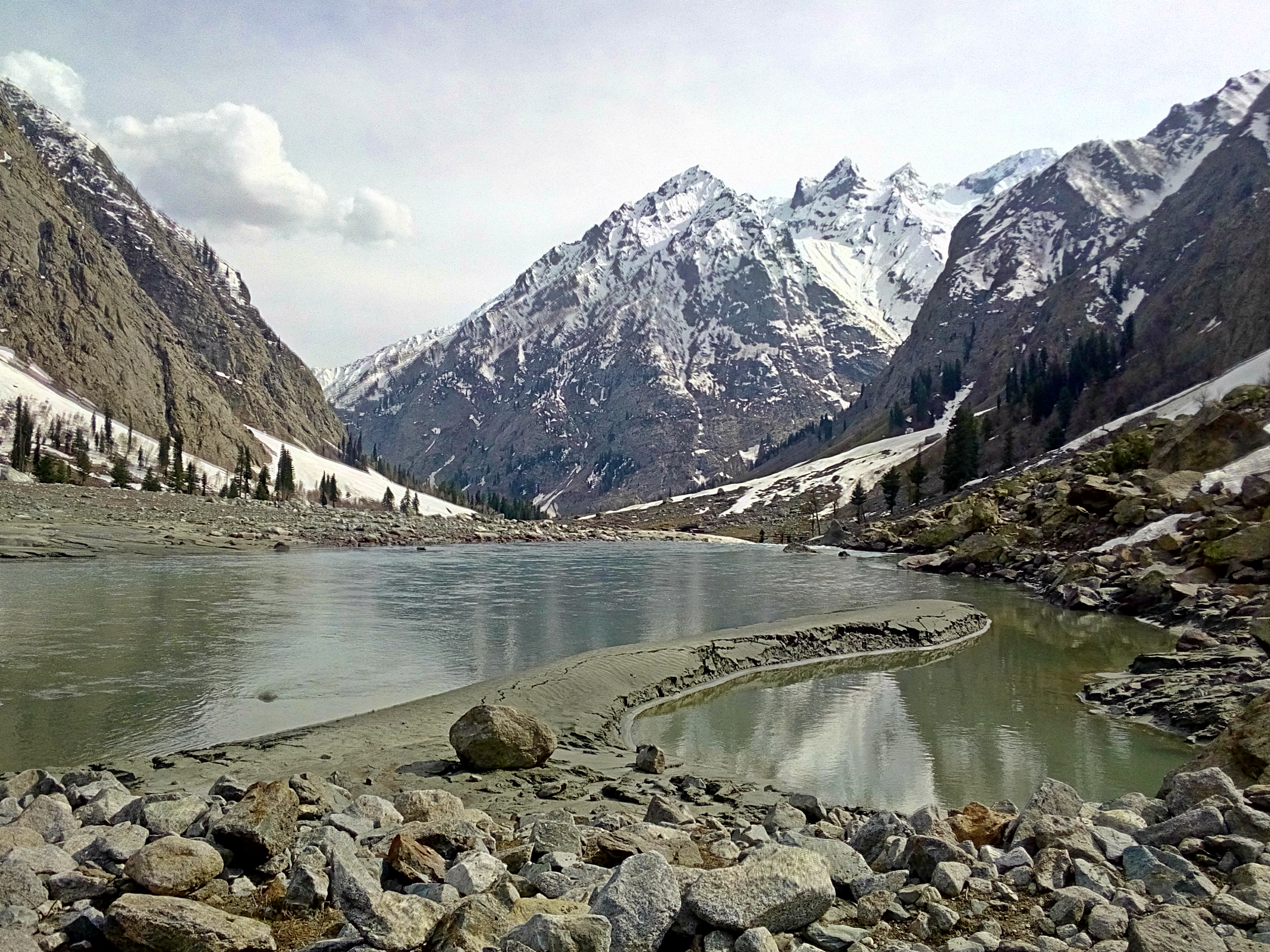
Kharkhari at Gabral tributary of Swat River

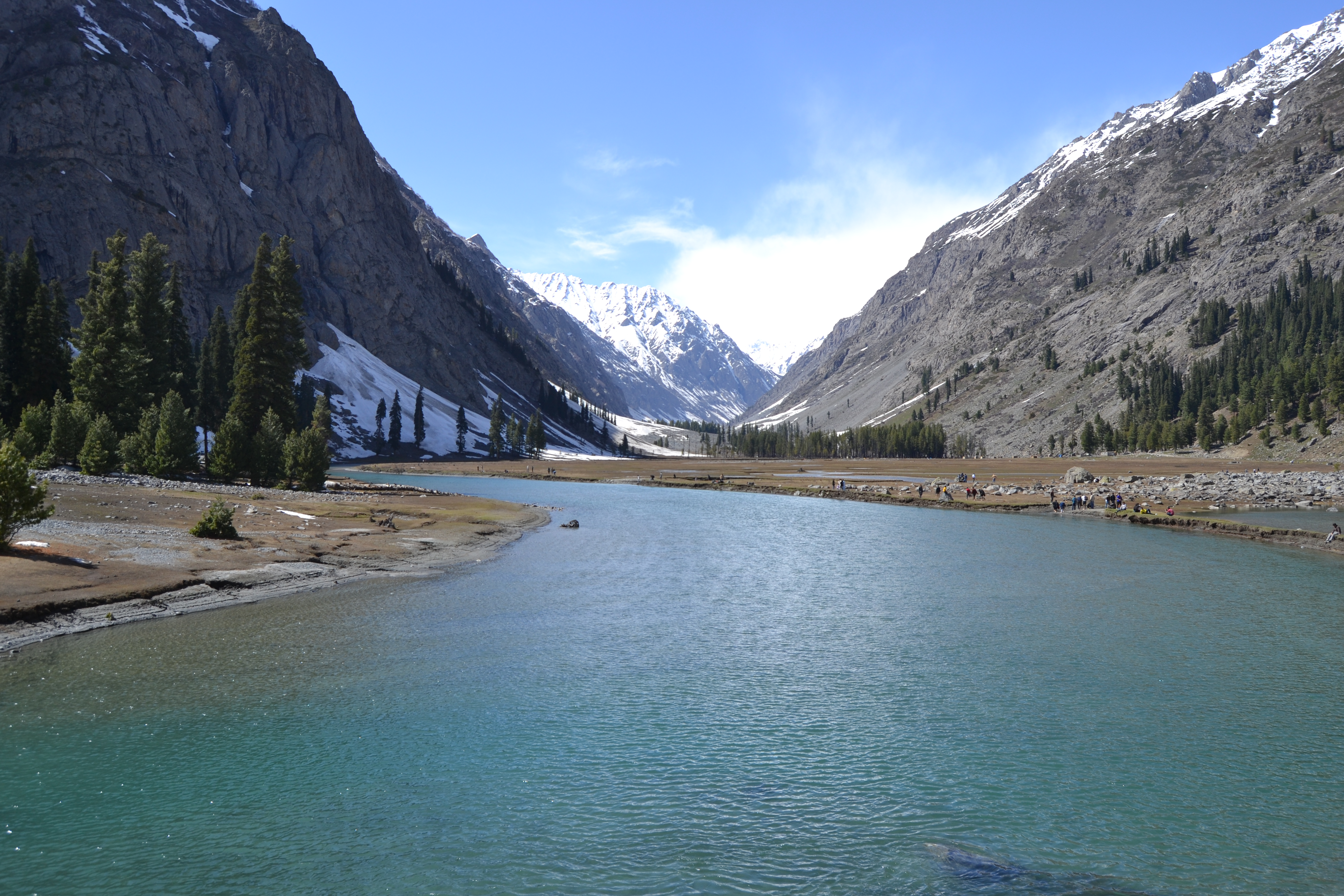
Mahodand at Usho tributary of Swat River

Along the Swat River scenic views attract tourists from across the country. Broad sections of the Swat River are sometimes called as lakes by tourism agencies, such as the so-called Kharkhari Lake (35°40′38″N 72°24′03″E), 45 kilometres northwest of Kalam Valley and 17 kilometres north of Utror, Gabral Valley on a section of Gabral Stream, a tributary of Swat River. The Mahodand Lake (35.7138°N 72.6502°E) is another such section of Usho Stream, 40 kilometres (25 mi) away from Kalam, at an elevation of 2,865 m (9,400 ft). In the summer, the river valley is surrounded by a sheet of alpine flowers like geum, blue poppy, potentilla and gentian. Apart from it, the lake is encircled by diverse pinus species which serves as abode for wild birds.

== See also ==
- Rigvedic rivers
- Barikot
