= Usho =

Coordinates: 35.5400°N 72.6510°E

- Usho
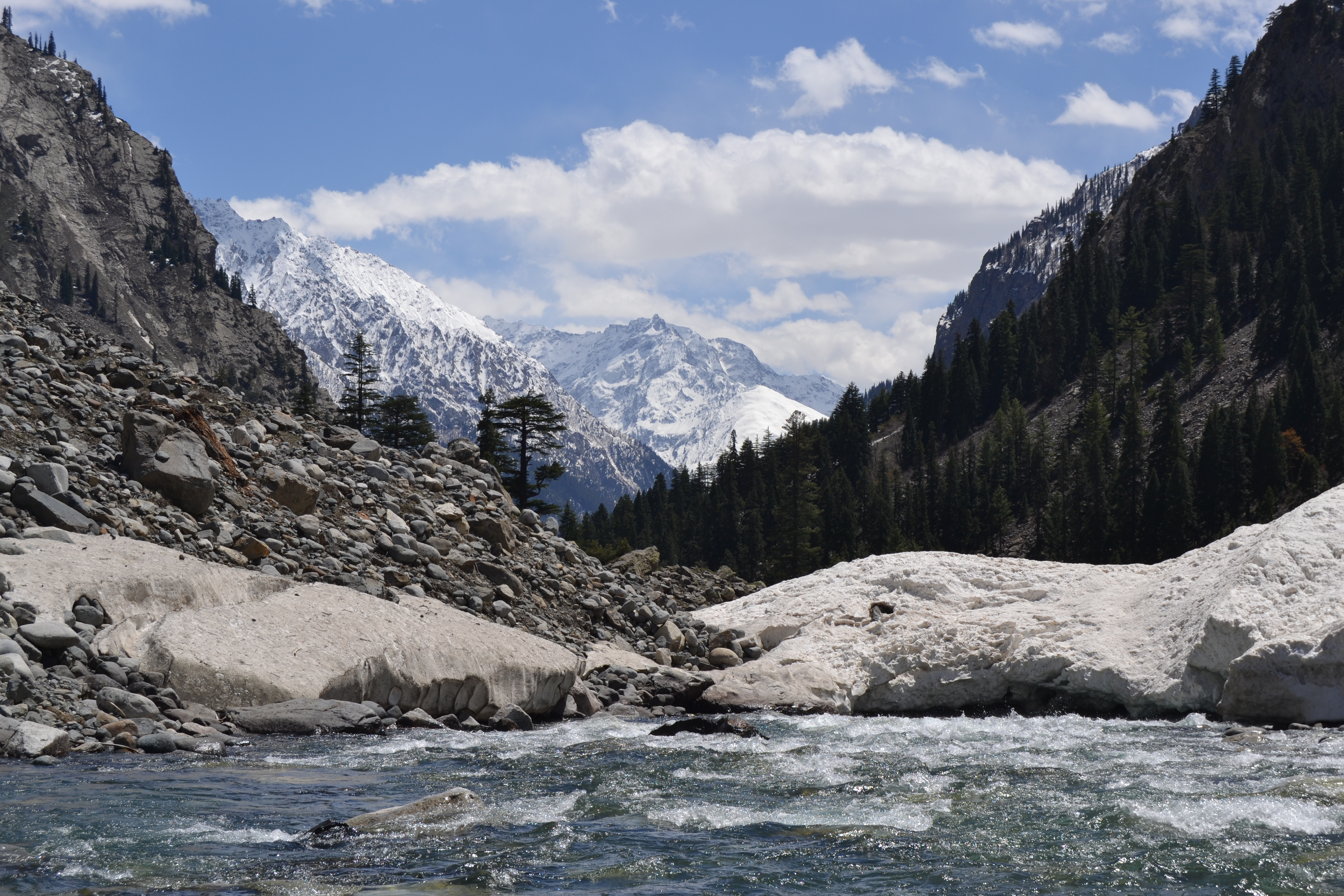
- Usho valley in the Swat Kohistan
- Interactive map of Usho
- Country: Pakistan
- Province: Khyber Pakhtunkhwa
- District: Upper Swat District
- Tehsil: Behrain

Usho (اوشو, also spelled Ushu; from Gawri oš lit. 'cold, ice') is a village in the Usho Valley, Khyber Pakhtunkhwa province of Pakistan. It is situated 8 kilometers (5.0 mi) from Kalam and 123 kilometers (76 mi) km from Mingora in the Swat Kohistan region, at the height of 2,300 meters (7,550 feet). Usho is mainly inhabited by the Gawri people.

It is known for its beautiful cloudy and rainy forest. Tourist attraction Mahodand lake is located 27 kilometers (17 mi) from there. In winter, the famous Ushu glacier blocks the only path to the Mahodand lake and this path is only opened again in Summer, when the snow of the glacier melts and the authorities wipe of the remaining snow from the road.

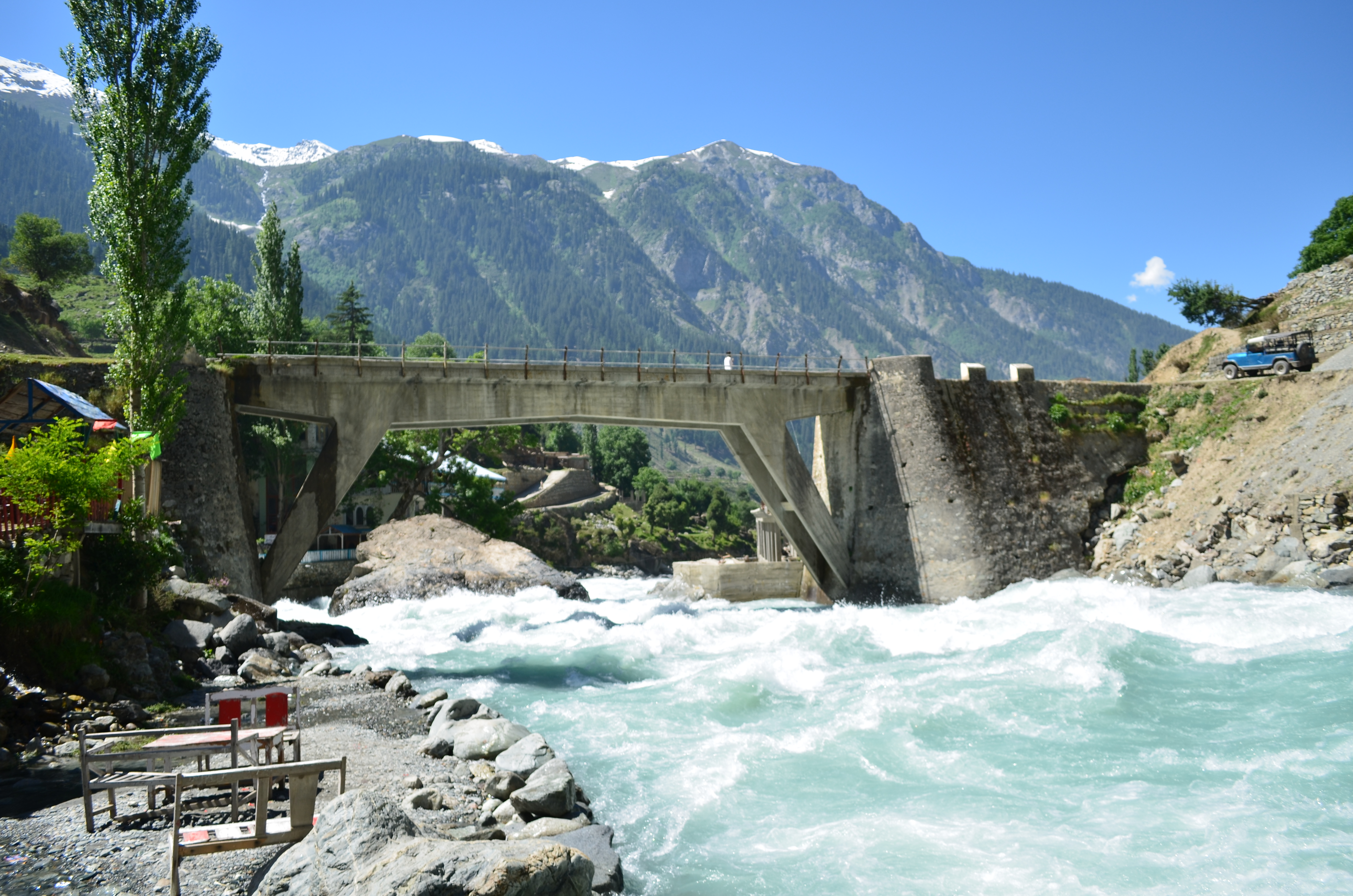
A view of Swat River

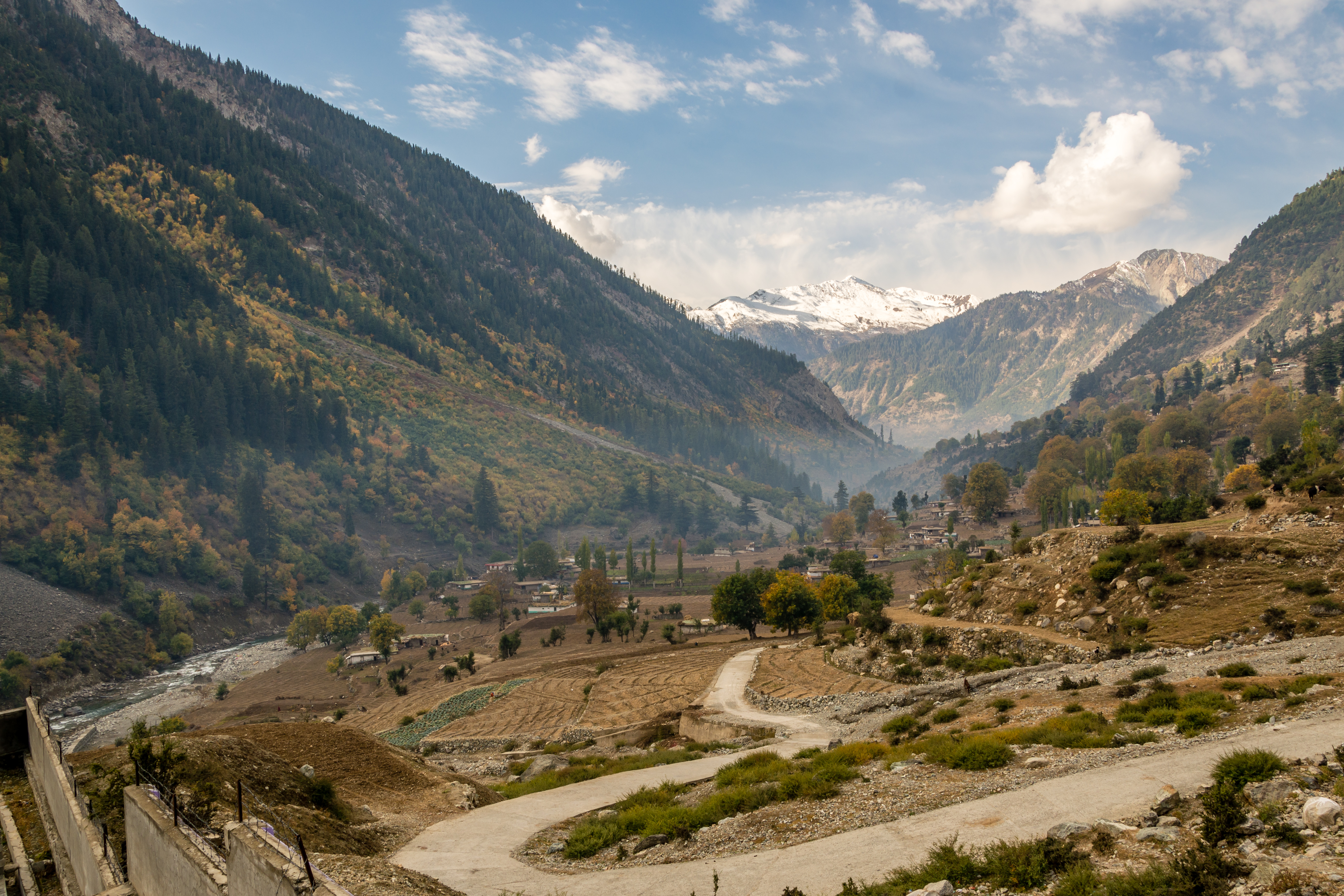
Usho

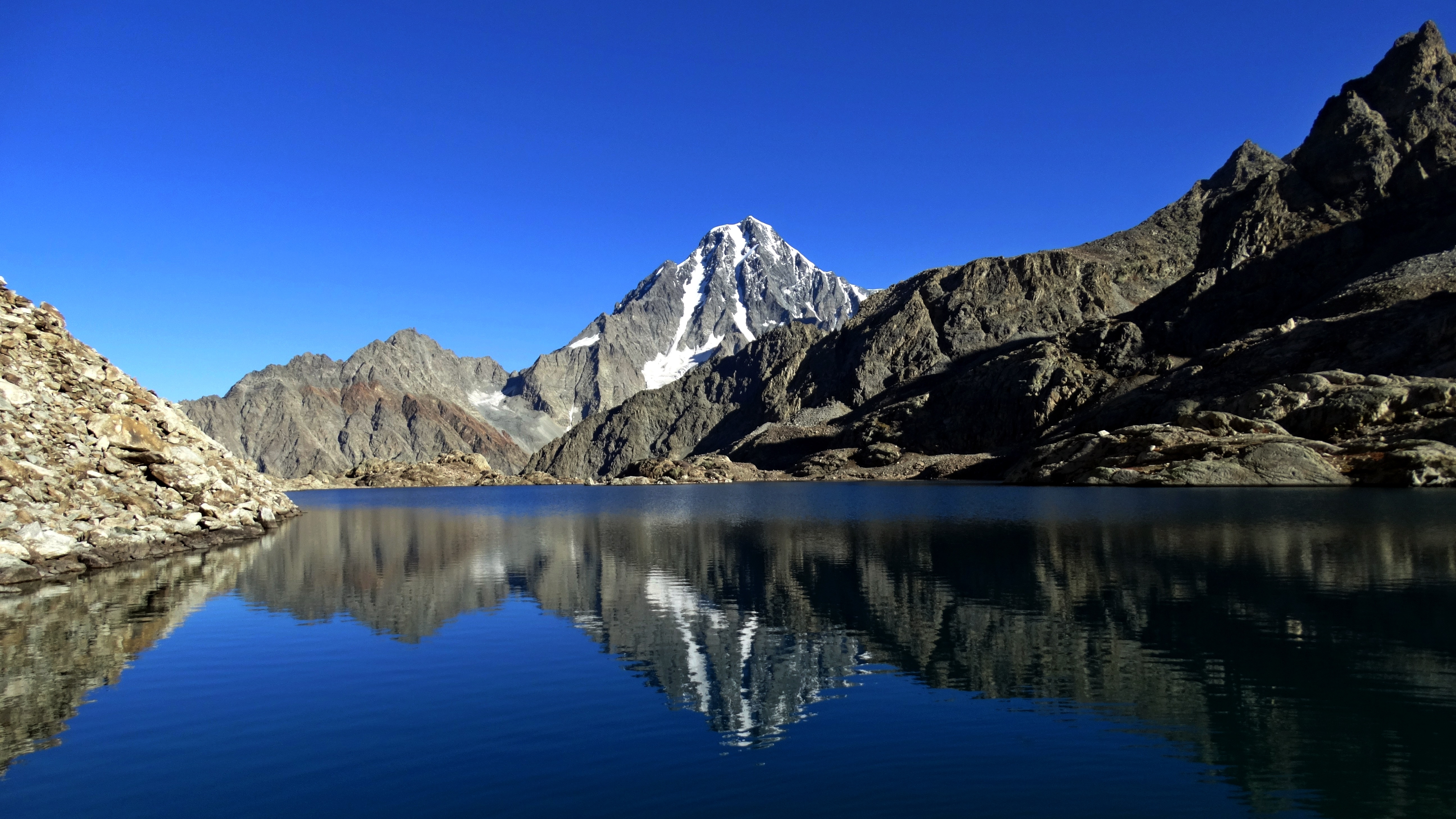
Jabba Zomalu Lake, Usho

== See also ==
- Matiltan
- Utror
- Gabral
- Mahodand
