= Utror =

Union council in Swat, Pakistan

Coordinates: 35°29′30″N 72°28′10″E

- Union council
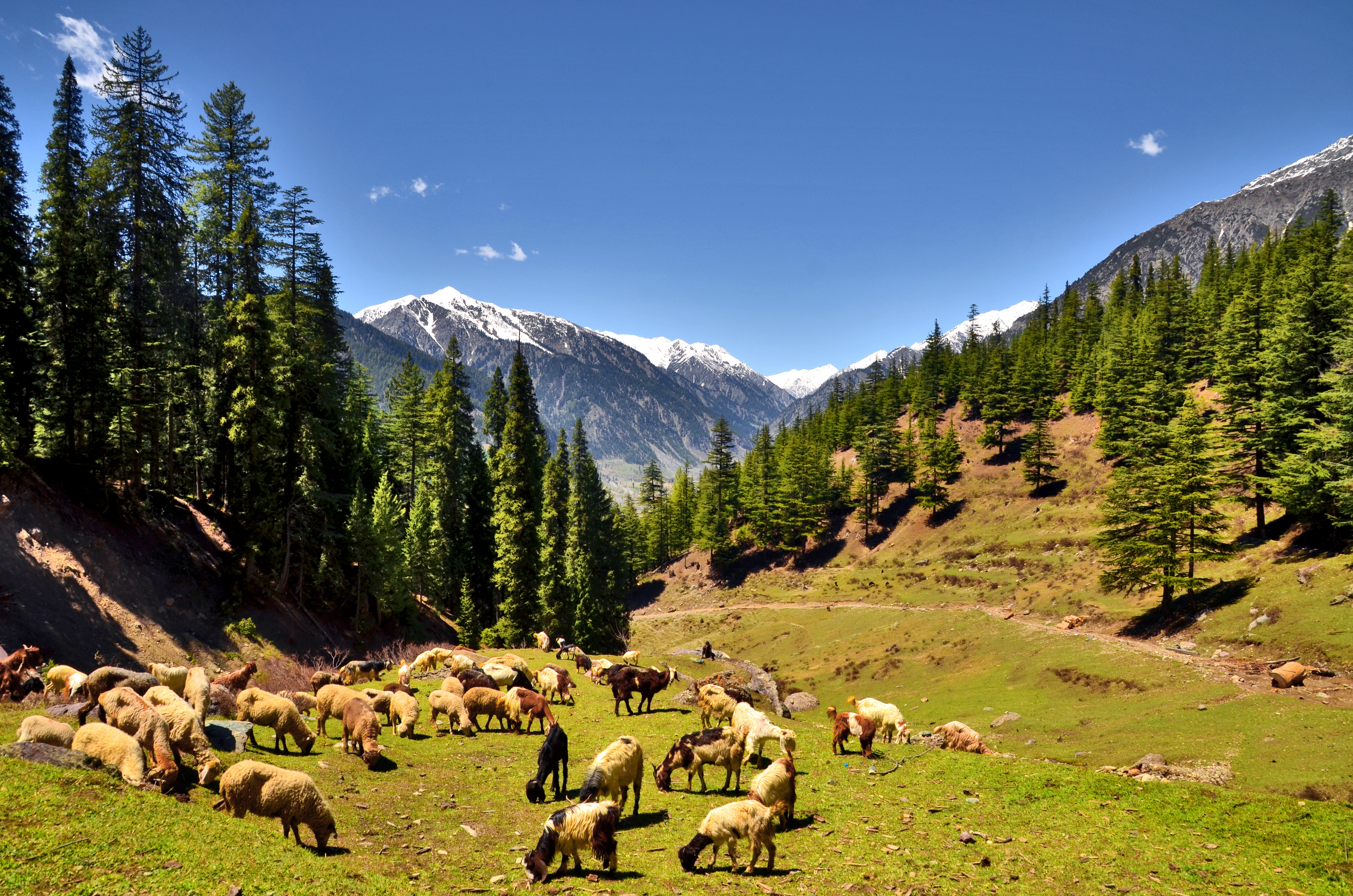
- Utror Valley, in Upper Swat District
- Interactive map of Utror
- Country: Pakistan
- Province: Khyber Pakhtunkhwa
- District: Upper Swat District
- Tehsil: Behrain Tehsil

Population (2017)
  - Total: 16,048

Utror, also spelt Atror, is a valley and a union council of the Behrain Tehsil, located in Upper Swat District of Khyber Pakhtunkhwa, Pakistan. It is surrounded by snow-clad mountains, green pastures and waterfalls. The area of the valley is about 47,400 hectares (474 km^{2}). It is one of the valleys in Swat Kohistan inhabited by the Gawri people.

Utror is 16 km (9.9 mi) away from Kalam Valley and 116 km (72 mi) from Saidu Sharif. The population of the region is around 16,048 as of 2017. Utror is surrounded by Bhan valley on the east, Upper Dir District on the west, Kalam on the south and Gabral on the north. The altitude of the valley at Utror proper is 2,300 metres (7,500 ft) and reaches 2,900 metres (9,500 ft) at Kundol Lake. Badogai Pass connects it to Upper Dir District. Further the region leads to Chitral.

== See also ==
- Usho
- Matiltan
- Gabral
- Mahodand
