= Gabral, Kohistan =

Gabral گبرال
- village
- Location in Khyber Pakhtunkhwa Gabral (Pakistan)
- Coordinates: 35.5275°N 72.4120°E
- Country: Pakistan
- Province: Khyber Pakhtunkhwa
- District: Upper Swat
- Tehsil: Behrain
- Elevation: 2,286 m (7,500 ft)

Population (2017)
  - Total: 3,263
- Time zone: UTC+5 (PST)

Gabral
- Union Council
- Interactive map of Gabral

Population (2017)
  - Total: 23,673

Gabral (also spelled Gabrāl, or Ghabral; from Gawri gha lit. 'Small valley where stream flows') is a village and union council in the Gabral Valley of Upper Swat District in Khyber Pakhtunkhwa province, Pakistan. It is located on the slopes of the western end of the Himalayas, where the Gabral River joins the Utror River, a tributary of the Swat River. Gabral is located at an elevation of 2,286 metres (7,500 ft). It is about 7 kilometres (4.3 mi) northwest (by road) from Utror, 20 kilometres (12 mi) west of Kalam, and 120 kilometres (75 mi) of Saidu Sharif.

The downtown area is located about 500 metres (1,600 ft) north of the mouth of the Gabral River. The village consists of a few hundred houses scattered along the valley bottom, in a band 200–500 metres (660–1,640 ft) wide, on both sides of the Gujjar Gabral River, starting about 7 km north of the junction, and continuing down the Utror valley until it merges with the town of Utror. The main road of the town runs next to the river and up the valley, for about 14 km. A few farms are seen up to that point.

== See also ==
- Matiltan
