= Kalam Valley =

Kalam
- Valley
- کالام
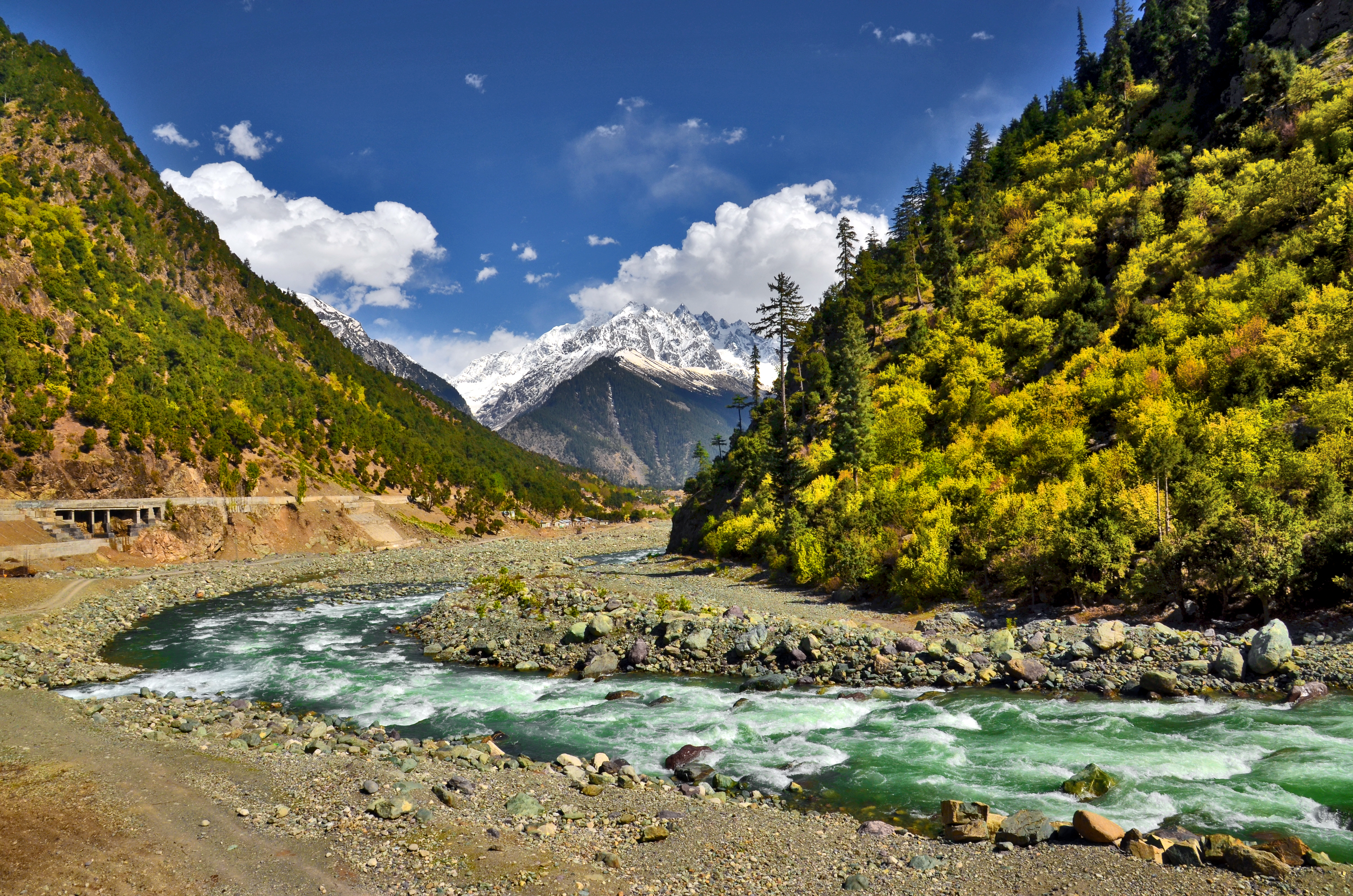
- Kalam Valley

- Location within Khyber Pakhtunkhwa Location within Pakistan
- Coordinates: 35.4801°N 72.5874°E
- Country: Pakistan
- Province: Khyber Pakhtunkhwa
- District: Upper Swat
- Tehsil: Behrain
- Elevation: 2,001 m (6,565 ft)

Population (2017)
  - Total: 23,170
- Time zone: UTC+5 (PST)

Kalam (Gawri and Urdu: کالام) is a valley located in the Swat Kohistan region of Upper Swat District in the Khyber Pakhtunkhwa province, Pakistan. It is the site where the Swat River forms as a result of the confluence of two major tributaries, the Gabral and Ushu rivers. Kalam valley is predominantly inhabited by Gawri people.

Located 99 kilometres (62 mi) north from Mingora and at an elevation of about 2,000 m (6,600 ft) above sea level, the valley itself provides a plateau that is located above the river and is used for farming. There are a number of visible mountains, also visible from Matiltan, a valley close to Kalam Valley, including Mount Falak Sar at 5,918 meters (19,416 feet), and another unnamed peak at 6,096 meters (20,000 feet) high.

== Climate ==
With a mild, generally warm and temperate climate, Kalam features a Humid continental climate (Dfa) under the Köppen climate classification. The average temperature in Kalam is 13.4 °C (56.1 °F), while the annual precipitation averages 639 mm (25.16 in). November is the driest month with 15 mm (0.59 in) of precipitation, while April, the wettest month, has an average precipitation of 93 mm (3.66 in).

July is the hottest month of the year with an average temperature of 24.1 °C (75.4 °F). The coldest month, January, has an average temperature of 1.5 °C (34.7 °F).

Climate data for Kalam
Month	Jan	Feb	Mar	Apr	May	Jun	Jul	Aug	Sep	Oct	Nov	Dec	Year
Mean daily maximum °C (°F)	6.9 (44.4)	8.0 (46.4)	12.2 (54.0)	18.0 (64.4)	22.8 (73.0)	26.1 (79.0)	26.4 (79.5)	25.7 (78.3)	23.8 (74.8)	19.6 (67.3)	13.9 (57.0)	9.6 (49.3)	17.8 (63.9)
Daily mean °C (°F)	−0.4 (31.3)	1.0 (33.8)	5.2 (41.4)	10.8 (51.4)	15.3 (59.5)	18.5 (65.3)	20.1 (68.2)	19.4 (66.9)	16.4 (61.5)	11.7 (53.1)	6.6 (43.9)	2.4 (36.3)	10.6 (51.0)
Mean daily minimum °C (°F)	−7.6 (18.3)	−5.9 (21.4)	−1.7 (28.9)	3.7 (38.7)	7.8 (46.0)	11.0 (51.8)	13.8 (56.8)	13.1 (55.6)	9.0 (48.2)	3.8 (38.8)	−0.7 (30.7)	−4.7 (23.5)	3.5 (38.2)
Average rainfall mm (inches)	49 (1.9)	66 (2.6)	88 (3.5)	93 (3.7)	64 (2.5)	32 (1.3)	66 (2.6)	66 (2.6)	41 (1.6)	28 (1.1)	15 (0.6)	31 (1.2)	639 (25.2)
Source: PMD

== Lakes ==
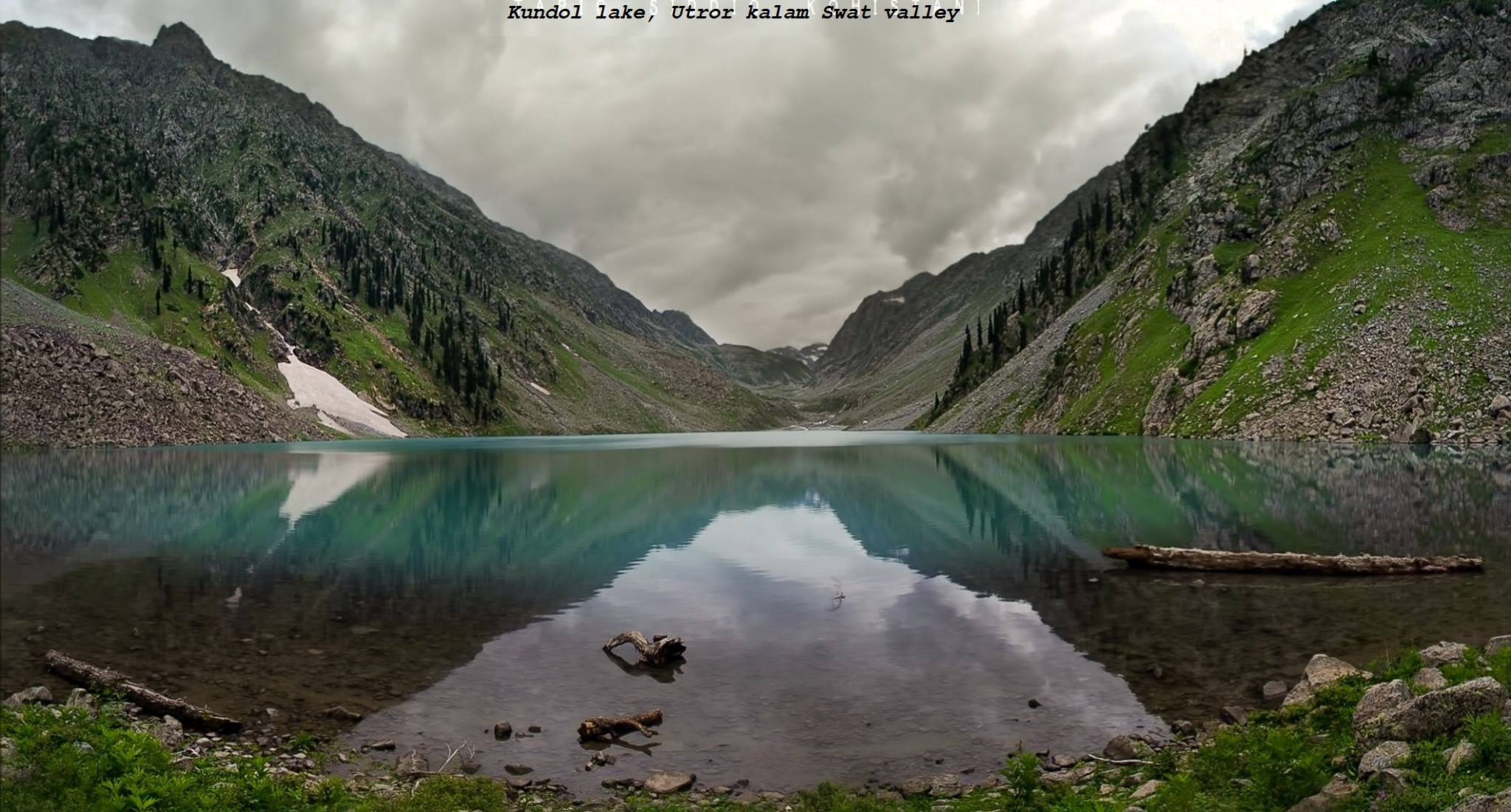
Kundol lake, Utror Kalam Swat

Kalam has numerous alpine glacial lakes. Two notable lakes in the Kalam Valley are the Mahodand lake and Kandol lake, both of which are frequently visited due to their easy access routes. Other lakes in the region, such as Izmis lake, are harder to enter and need to be done so through trekking.

Mahodand Lake is a large lake in the Swat Valley, located approximately 40 km from Kalam, in the Usho Sub-valley, at the base of the Hindu Kush mountains.

Another notable lake in the Kalam Valley is the Kundol Lake, located in the north of Utror region, 19 km away from Kalam. It is located at the base of the Hindu Kush mountains.

== Gallery ==
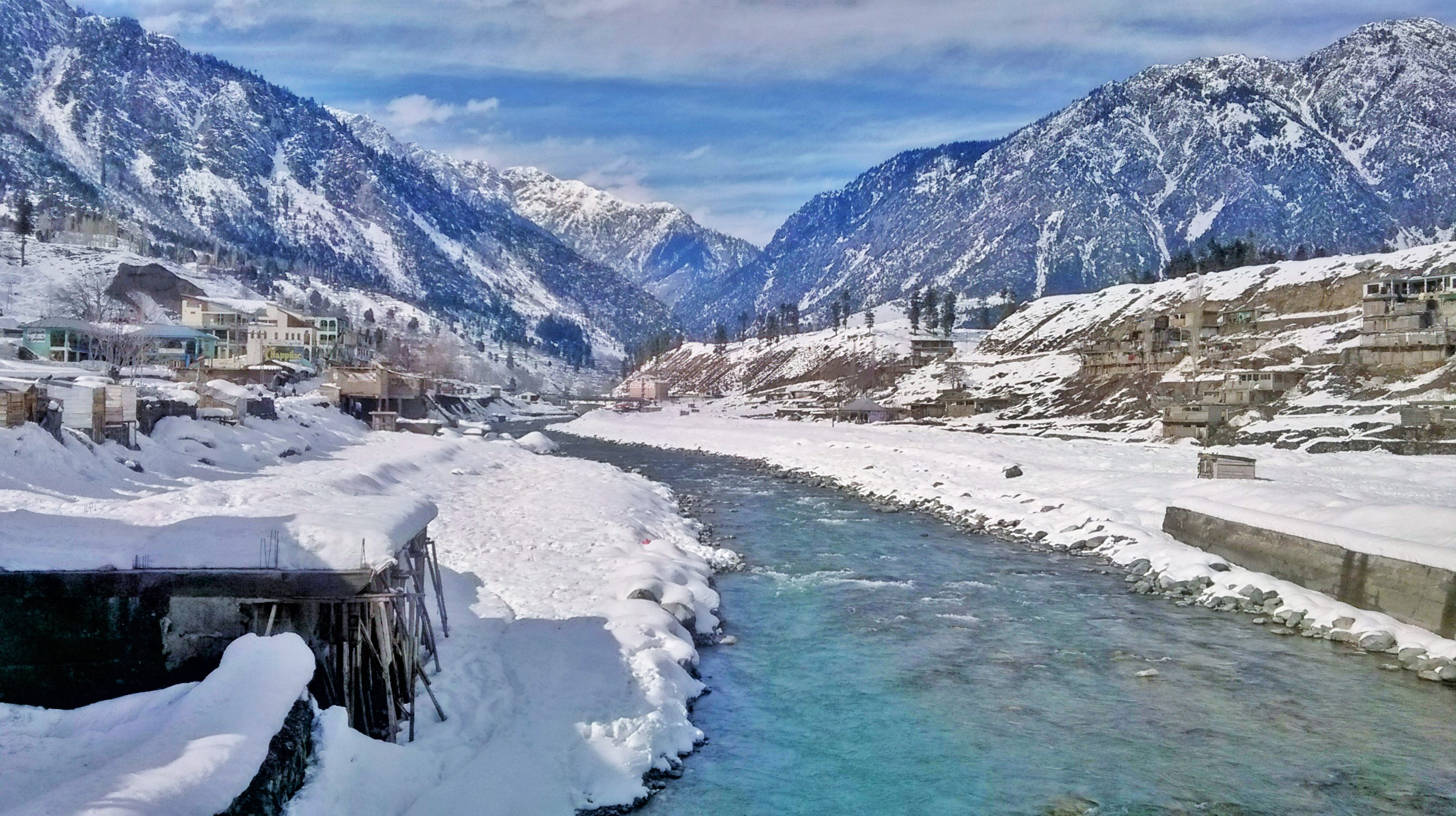

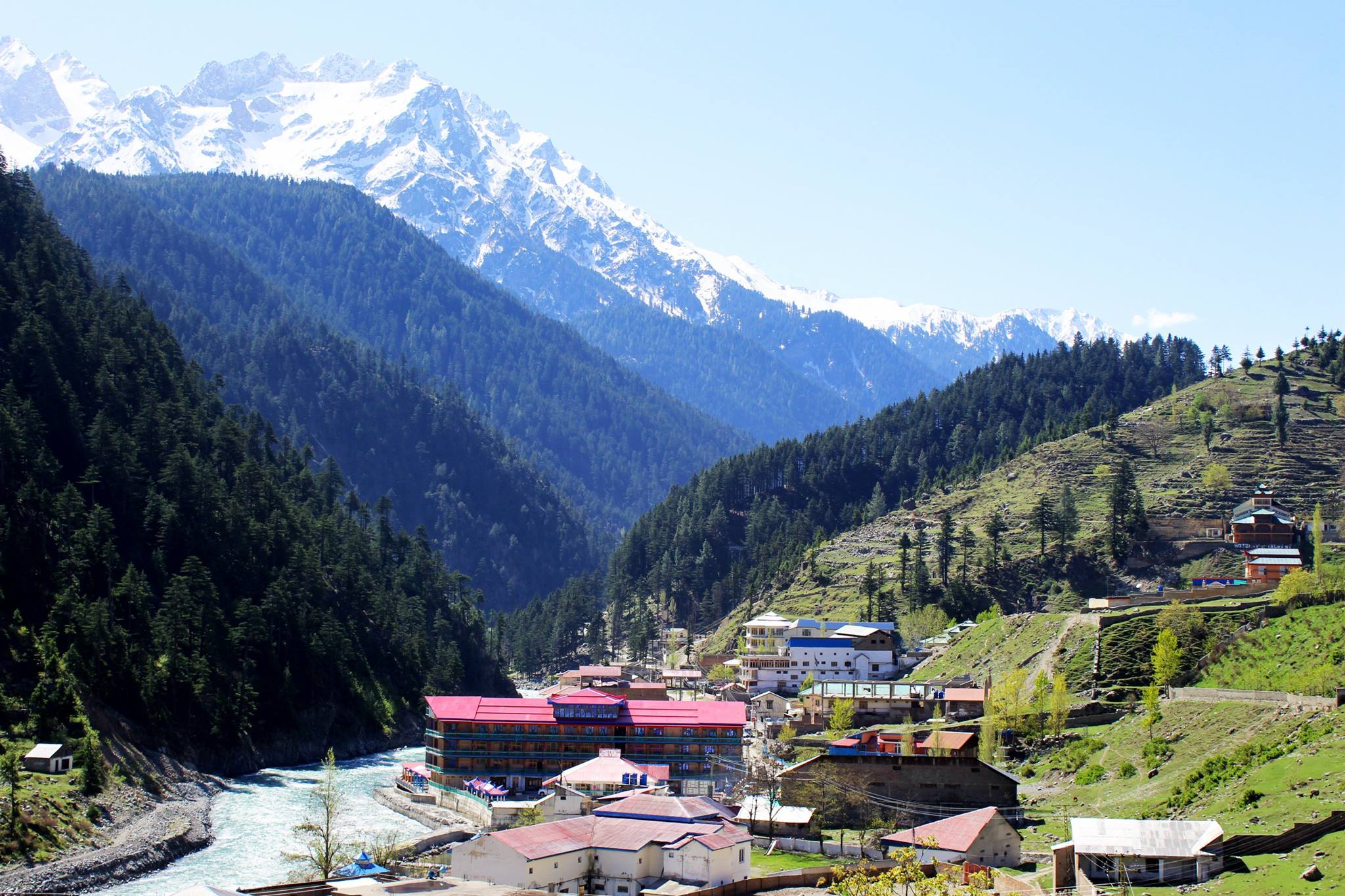

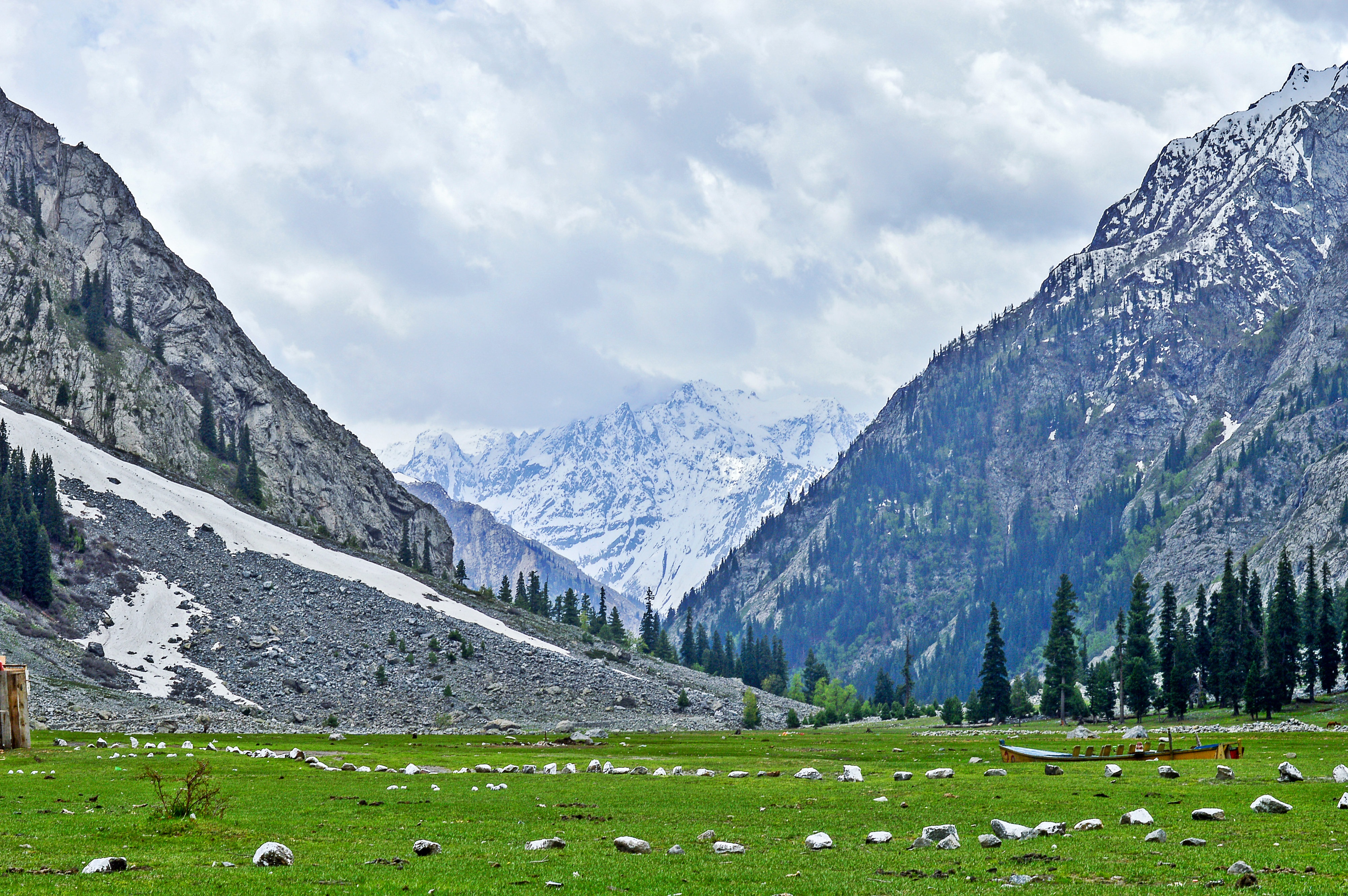

== See also ==
- Bahrain, Swat
- Kumrat Valley
- Mahodand Lake
- Swat Valley
- Kalam summer festival
- Tourism in Khyber Pakhtunkhwa
