= Kohistan, Pakistan =

Kohistan کوہستان
- Region
- Province: Khyber Pakhtunkhwa

Area
  - Total: 11,531 km^{2} (4,452 sq mi)

Population (2023 census)
  - Total: 1,395,190

Demographics
  - Languages: Kohistani, Shina, Pashto, Gujari, Torwali, Gawri, Urdu
- Time zone: Pakistan Standard Time
- Largest cities: Dasu; Pattan; Bahrain; Sheringal

Kohistan is a mountainous region located in the northern Pakistan. It consists of Indus Kohistan, Swat Kohistan and Dir Kohistan in the Khyber Pakhtunkhwa province. Its total area is 11,531 km^{2} (4,452 sq mi).

== Geography ==
Districts of present-day Khyber Pakhtunkhwa, Pakistan.

Today, Kohistan refers to the narrow mountainous tract of land, divided among Swat, Dir and Indus Kohistan, where Kohistanis still form a majority. Geographically it comprise upper Panjkora Valley, upper Swat Valley and a section of Indus Valley. It is bounded by Chitral to the north and north-west, Gilgit-Baltistan to the north and north-east and rest of the Khyber Pakhtunkhwa to the south. Administratively, eastern Kohistan is divided into the districts of Upper Kohistan, Lower Kohistan and Kolai-Palas districts. The western Kohistan is divided into Sharingal and Behrain tehsils in the Upper Dir and Upper Swat districts, respectively. The region features snow-bounded peaks over the height of 3,700 m (12,100 ft) as well as forests and grassy meadows over 1,500 m (4,900 ft).

== History ==
Kohistan is home to a number of Indigenous northwestern Indo-Aryan peoples, collectively known as Kohistanis, who inhabited a larger region than their present extent in the past. The Gibari-speaking Sultans of Swat controlled most of the present-day Swat, Malakand, Dir and Buner regions until the 16th century. Sultanate of Swat was invaded by the Yousafzai Pashtuns under the leadership of Malak Ahmad Khan Yusufzai between 1510 and 1515, who forced most of the Kohistanis to take refuge in the Swat Kohistan.

The Pashtun migration, followed by the Pashtunization of the region, continued in the following centuries. In the early 20th century, Swat emerged as an autonomous state under the Miangul dynasty. Miangul Abdul Wadud undertook several campaigns against the Kohistanis of Shangla, settling Pashtuns there.

Kohistan region was part of Malakand and Hazara Tribal Agencies during the British colonial period. Until 1 May 1934, Indus Kohistan was included in the Gilgit Agency, when its control was transferred to the North Western Frontier Province. However, its area continued to be counted in the total area of the princely state of Jammu and Kashmir. The Kalam tract was established as an independent tribal agency by the colonial government in 1926 due to the competing claims by the states of Chitral, Dir, and Swat. After the independence, however, the ruler of Swat annexed Kalam into Swat. It remained so until 1954, when it was agreed between the Government of Pakistan and Swat that Kalam would be de-jure part of Pakistan, nevertheless, the Wali of Swat would continue to administer it on the behalf of Pakistani government. Swat Kohistan became part of the newly created Swat District after the formal abolition of princely states in 1971.

== Demographics ==
According to the 2023 Census of Pakistan, the Kohistan region had total population of 1,395,190.

=== Languages ===
Languages of Kohistan Region (2023)
1. Kohistani (64.3%)
2. Pashto (17.9%)
3. Shina (4.28%)
4. Other (13.6%)

The region is rich in linguistic diversity. The 2023 Pakistani census counted the various Kohistani languages under a single label, including Indus Kohistani, Torwali, Gawri, Kohistani Shina, Bateri, and others, thus skewing the census results as many of their speakers call their language simply as Kohistani. On the other hand, many Gawri and Torwali speakers chose 'other', notably in Bahrain Tehsil, while many Shina speakers selected Kohistani in Indus Kohistan. The census enumerated Kohistani (64.26%) as major language, followed by Pashto (17.89%), and Shina (4.28%). The other 13.57% speak different languages not included in the census. It is also estimated besides Shina and Indus Kohistani, some 10.5% population of Indus Kohistan speak Gujari and belongs to Gujar community.

From east to west, Shina is spoken on the east bank of Indus while Indus Kohistani is spoken on its west bank. Bateri is spoken in the Batera subdivision of Kolai-Palas. Further west, Torwali is spoken in the Chail Valley and the main Swat Valley from Bahrain upto Asrait, further north of which Gawri is spoken in the valleys of Kalam, Utror and Usho. Gawri is also spoken in the upper Panjkora Valley (mainly Kumrat Valley); the major Gawri speaking towns in Kumrat include Thal, Rajkot, Kalkot, Barikot, Lamuti and Biar. In Swat Gujari is spoken in several villages, including Laikot, Peshmal, Gabral and Badai Serai. It is also dispersed across the region. While Pashto is spoken in the lower reaches of region, including Madyan and Sheringal. In addition, a number of smaller Indo-Aryan languages are spoken across the region, including Kalkoti in Kalkot, Ushojo in Chail valley, and Gowro and Chilisso in eastern Kohistan.

Due to its historical and ethnical relations with the neighbouring Gilgit-Baltistan, Kohistan as well as Chitral is claimed by the Gilgit Baltistan nationalists as part of the greater Gilgit Baltistan.

=== Ethnic groups ===
The main tribes or ethnic groups in the region are:

- Shina (over 450,000, 2025 est.)
- Hazara Kohistani (over 300,000, 2025 est.)
- Pashtun (over 250,000, 2023 est., mainly in Indus Kohistan)
- Gujjar (over 10.5% of population in Indus Kohistan, 2024 est., and over 40,000 in Swat Kohistan, 2025 est.)
- Torwali (over 140,000, 2021 est.)
- Gawri (over 140,000, 2025 est.)
- Bateri (over 22,000, 2003 est.)

== Tourism ==
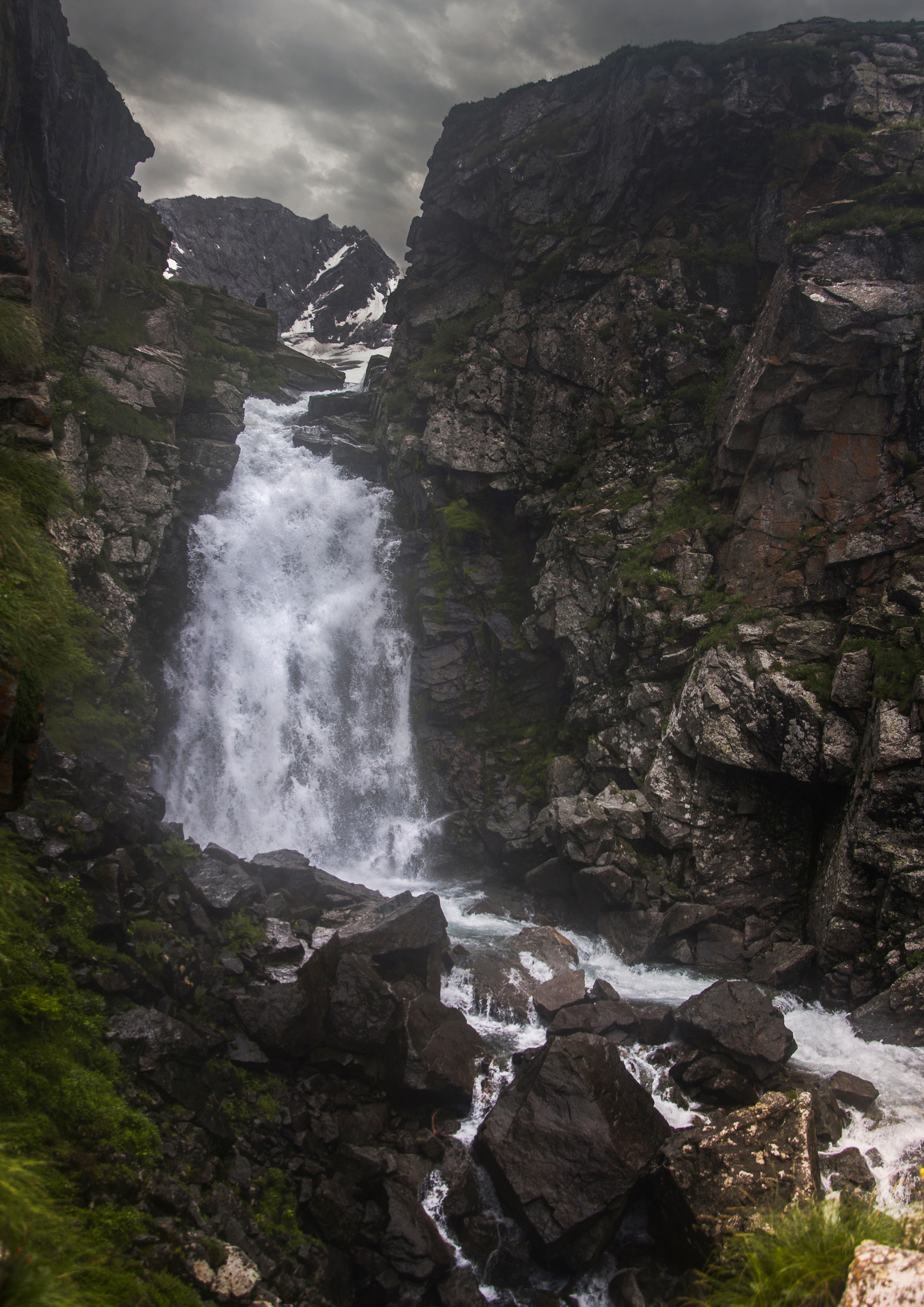
A waterfall from the Katora Lake in Kumrat Valley, a valley in the Western Kohistan

Kohistan is known for its scenery and contains a large number of alpine valleys, waterfalls and glacier lakes. Some of the most popular tourist attractions of Kohistan region include Kumrat Valley, Kalam Valley, and Katora Lake. The region is transversed by several rivers, including Swat, Panjkora, Indus and Chitral.

Indus Kohistan have many valleys, which include Seo Valley, Jhalkot Valley, Kandia Valley, Dubair Valley, Palas Valley, and Kolai Valley.
