= Gawri people =

Indo-Aryan ethnic group in Northern Pakistan

گاؤری

Total population
- 141,460 (2025 est.)

Regions with significant populations
- Swat and Dir Kohistan, Pakistan

Languages
- Gawri

Religion
- Sunni Islam

Related ethnic groups
- Torwalis, Indus Kohistanis and other Indo-Aryan peoples

The Gawri people (Gawri: گاؤری) are an indigenous Indo-Aryan ethnolinguistic group native to Dir Kohistan and Swat Kohistan in northern Pakistan. They speak Gawri, which belongs to the Kohistani branch of Indo-Aryan languages.

Gawris predominantly inhabit the Kumrat Valley in Upper Dir District and the valleys of Kalam, Usho and Utror in Upper Swat District. They are closely related to the neighbouring Torwalis and Indus Kohistanis.

== Geographic distribution ==
The traditional Gawri homeland is divided between two communities: the Upper Swat and Upper Panjkora river valleys, connected by the Badgoi Pass. In the Swat Valley, the main centre is the town of Kalam, set at the confluence of the Usho/Karan Daki and Swat rivers. The Gawri-speaking area in Swat is traditionally divided into three clusters of villages, each named after its principal settlement: Kalam proper in the lower reaches, the Utror cluster to the west, and the Usho cluster to the north-east.

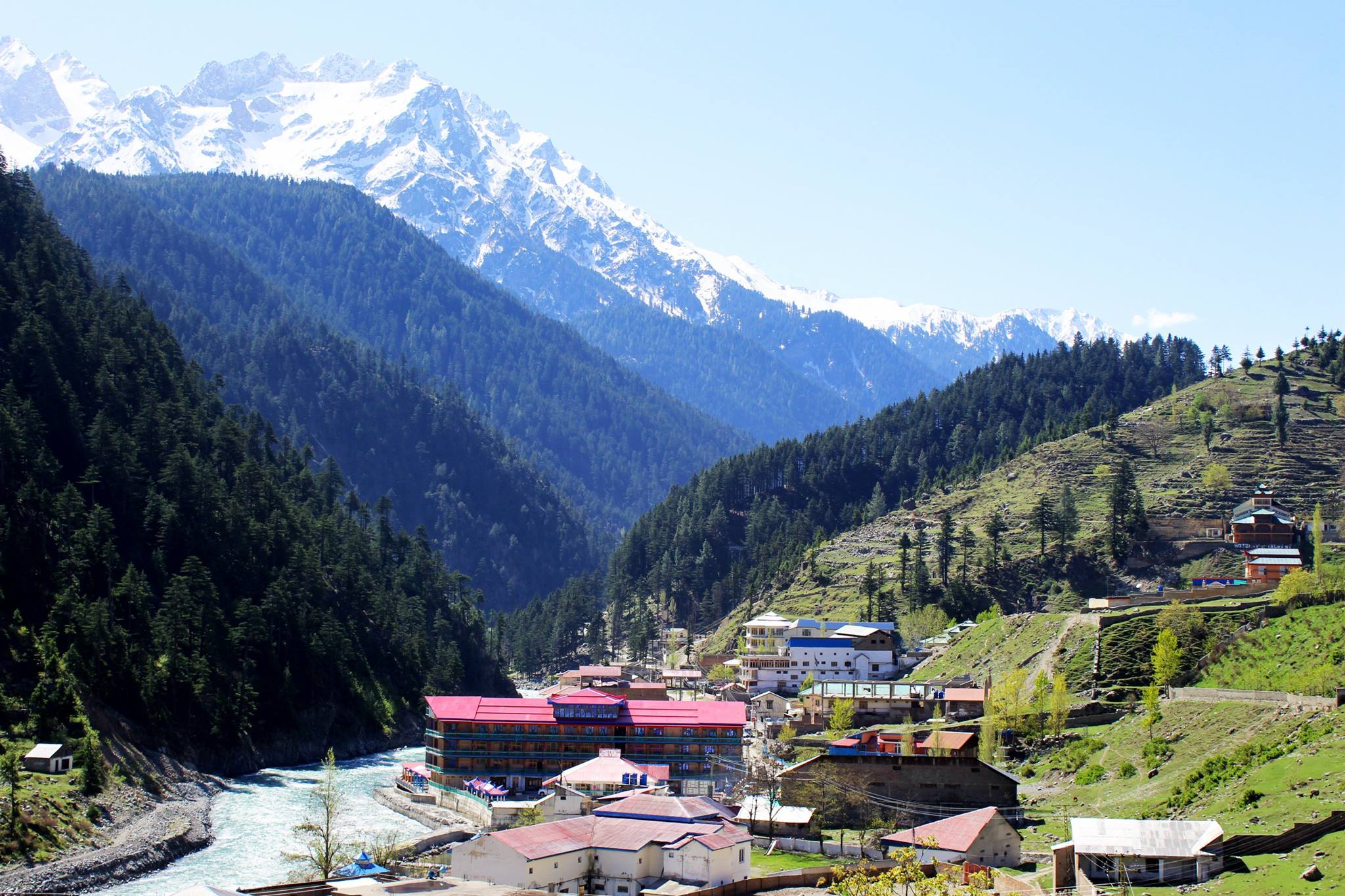
Kalam town at the banks of Swat River in Swat Kohistan

In the Panjkora Valley, Thal is the principal Gawri town and the last settlement in the Kumrat Valley. Other Gawri-speaking villages include Barikot, Rajkot, Biar, Kalkot and Lamuti, though in Barikot and Rajkot most Gawris have shifted to Pashto as their primary language.

To the south of Kalam, the Gawri-speaking area is separated from the Torwali-speaking Bahrain Valley by a belt of Gujari-speaking settlements, namely Peshmal, Laikot and Badai Serai. East of Kalam and Usho, Indus Kohistani is spoken as far as the west bank of the Indus. South of Kumrat, Pashto predominates, while further north Khowar is the dominant language of Chitral and Ghizer.

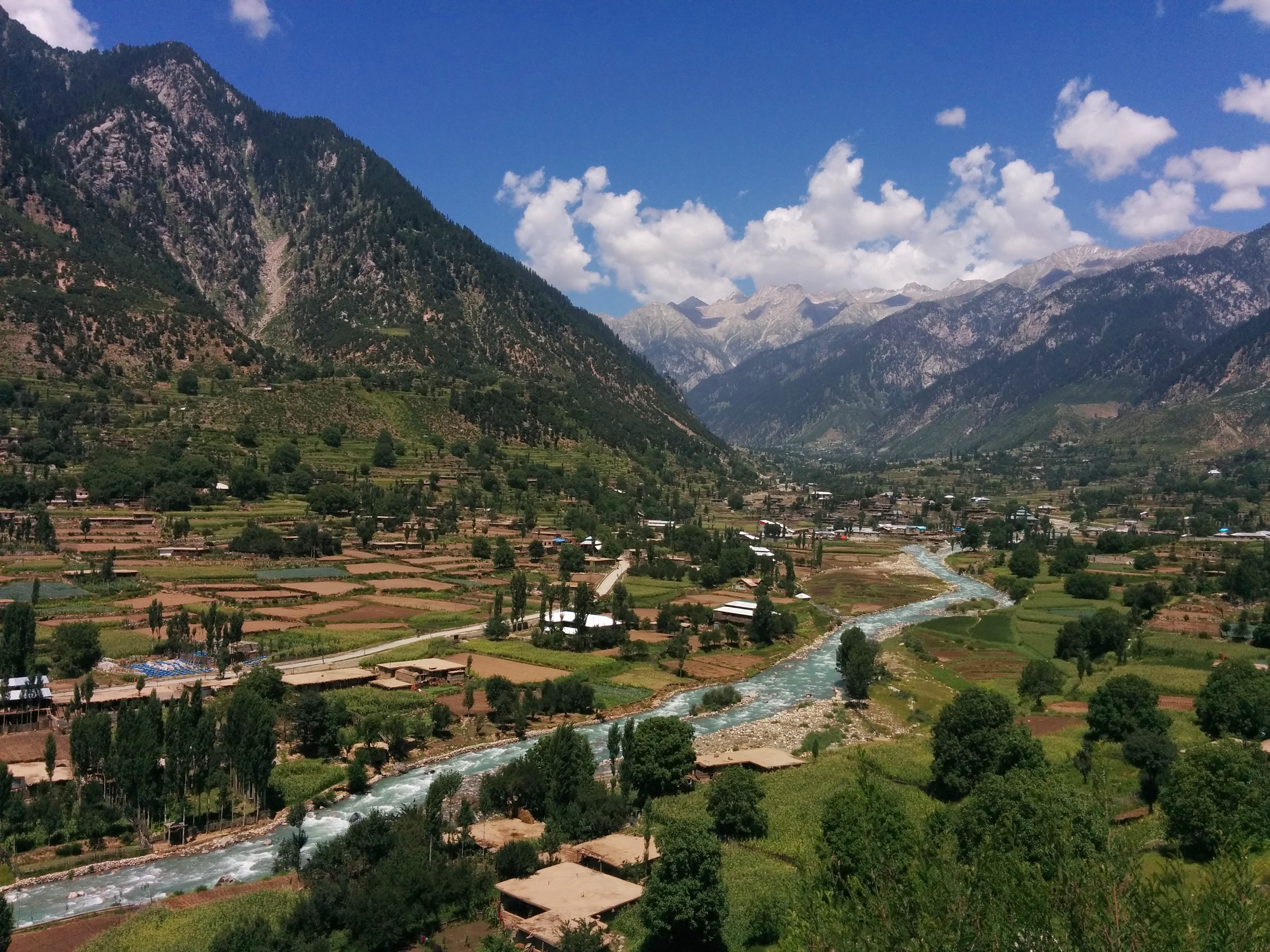
Panjkora River flowing through the Thal village in Dir Kohistan

== Demographics ==
The Gawri population was estimated at 141,460 in 2025, with 35 per cent under the age of fifteen. In Swat Kohistan alone, the figure was put at around 60,000 as of 2025.

Pakistan's 2023 Digital Census did not enumerate Gawri speakers separately, instead recording them under the umbrella label "Kohistani". As a result, more than 141,000 individuals in Bahrain Tehsil alone were classified under "Other" in the census, while around 30,000 in the same tehsil identified their language as Kohistani.

== History ==
Gawris are one of several Indo-Aryan speaking populations in the Kohistan region of northern Pakistan. The Kho people know them as Bashkarik; Pashtuns call them Kohistanis. Baart and Sagar (2002) suggest they are descended from the Gauraioi, referenced by Greek historians in the Dir region during Alexander the Great's invasion in 327 BC.

The invasion of Mahmud of Ghazni in the 11th century and the defeat of the Hindu Shahis pushed them out of the lower valleys and into the mountainous Upper Panjkora Valley. Local traditions hold that from there, groups of Gawri settlers crossed mountain passes into the Utror, Kalam and Usho valleys of what is now Swat district, while others remained in the upper Panjkora. From the 14th century onwards a new wave of Yousafzai Pashtun invaders gradually took over the lower parts of Dir and Swat. In the following centuries, Gawris converted to Islam.

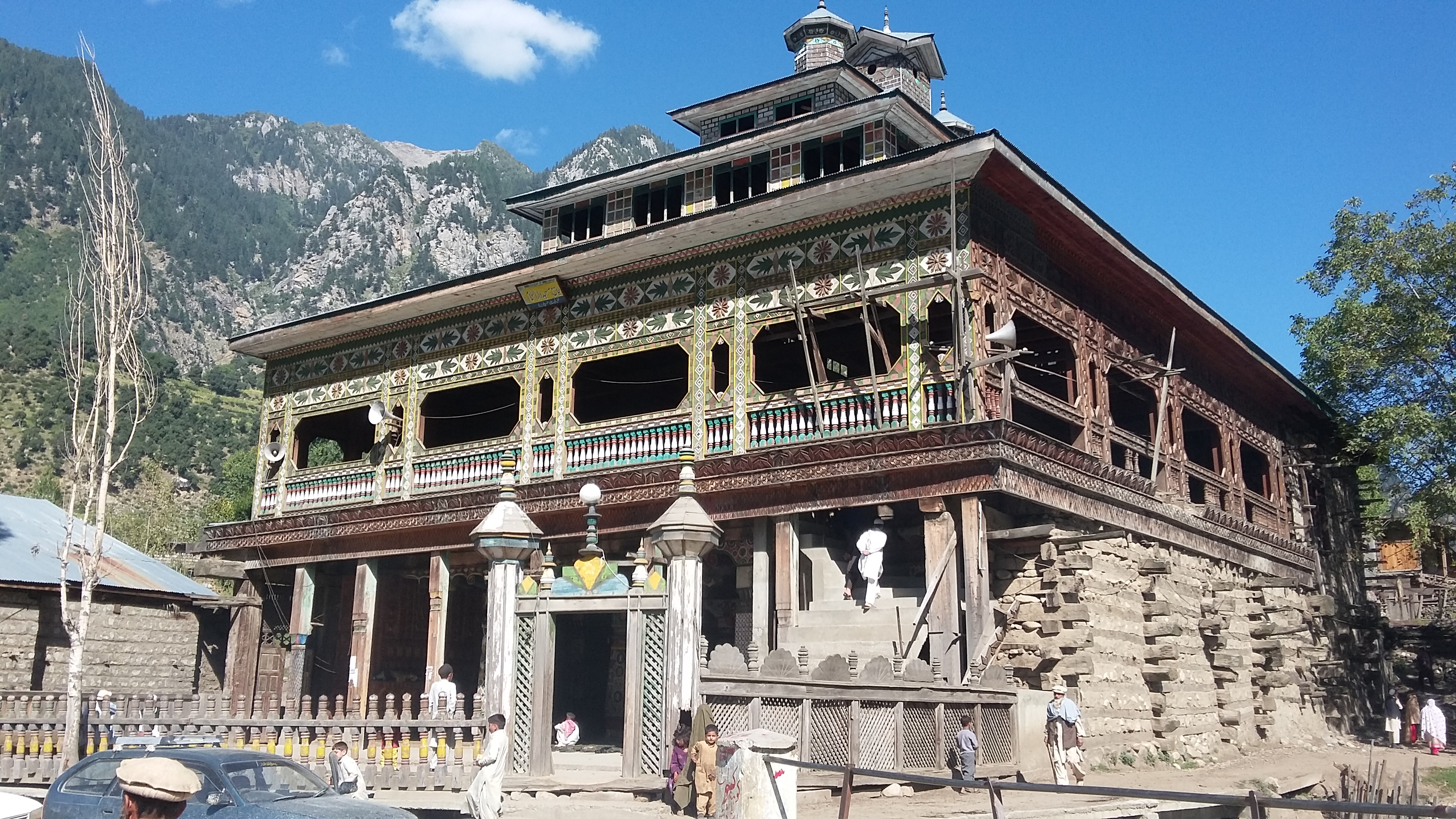
The Jamia Masjid of Thal, Kumrat, built entirely of wood some 300 years ago.

Gawris retained their internal independence into the 19th century. Dir city was in Gawri hands until 1804, when the Yousafzais took it. The Nawabs of Dir brought the Kumrat areas under their control in 1895, while the Kalam tract stayed independent through the colonial period, caught between competing claims from Chitral, Dir and Swat. In 1926, the British colonial government formalised this ambiguity by establishing the Kalam tract as a separate independent tribal agency. The Wali of Swat moved on Kalam Valley immediately after independence in 1947; by 1954 it was agreed that Kalam would remain de jure part of Pakistan while continuing to be administered by the Wali on behalf of the Pakistani government. When the princely states were dissolved in 1969, Kumrat and Kalam were absorbed into Dir and Swat districts respectively.

== Language ==
Gawri, also known as Kalami, Kalam Kohistani and Bashkarik, is classified within the Kohistani subgroup of north-western Indo-Aryan languages, alongside Torwali, Indus Kohistani, Bateri, Chilisso and Gawro. Together with Torwali, it is sometimes grouped under the label "Swat Kohistani". In older linguistic literature, the language appears as Bashkarik (Morgenstierne, 1940) and as Garwi or Gawri (Grierson, 1919; Barth and Morgenstierne, 1958), names that were largely unknown to speakers themselves, who have traditionally called their language simply Kohistani. The name Gawri has old historical roots and has been revived in recent decades by local intellectuals and cultural organisations.

Gawri is a tonal language written in a modified Arabic script. Its alphabet has 43 letters, built on the 39-letter Urdu alphabet with four additions; unlike in Urdu, vowel diacritics are mandatory in Gawri.

The language is classified as endangered. In 1921, George Grierson, editor of the Linguistic Survey of India, predicted that the Kohistani languages were "being gradually superseded by Pashto, and are dying out." While that prediction has proved overstated, the pressures have not eased: Pashto, Urdu and other dominant languages continue to displace Gawri, particularly among urban migrants and younger generations. In 2008, the Gawri Community Development Programme (GCDP) established a mother tongue-based multilingual education programme in Kalam, developing course materials in Gawri for pre-school children and producing books for adult readers.

== Culture ==
Gawri cultural life has a strong musical tradition. The principal instrument is a local variant of the sitar, typically strung with seven playing strings, two of which serve as melody strings; the neck is traditionally fashioned from Himalayan blue pine wood, with the hollow body made from mulberry or other locally available timber. A second common instrument is the mangey, an earthenware water pot used as a percussion instrument: the opening is covered with a rubber membrane struck by one hand while the other beats the rounded belly of the pot. Musical performances typically follow a call-and-response pattern between musicians and singer.

The classical form of Gawri poetry and song is known as rō, considered the most prestigious and popular poetic genre in the tradition. Audio recordings of notable rō poet-singers have circulated widely within the community. The Gawri area also has documented traditions of storytelling and oral poetry more broadly.

Like other Kohistani peoples, Gawris have historically practised transhumant pastoralism, moving seasonally between valley farmlands at around 1,000 metres and summer pastures at elevations up to 4,500 metres, while also cultivating maize, millet and other crops in the fertile valley floors.
