= Ethnic groups in Pakistan =

Ethnic map of Pakistan in 1973

Pakistan ethnic composition (2017)
1. Punjabis (44.7%)
2. Pashtuns (15.4%)
3. Sindhis (14.1%)
4. Saraikis (8.40%)
5. Muhajirs (7.60%)
6. Baloch (3.60%)
7. Others (6.30%)

Pakistan is an ethnically and linguistically diverse country. The major Pakistani ethnolinguistic groups include Punjabis, Pashtuns, Sindhis, Saraikis, Muhajirs, Hindkowans, Baloch, Brahuis. as well as Shinas, Baltis, Kashmiris, Paharis, Kho, Indus Kohistanis, Torwalis, Gawris, Hazaras, Burusho, Wakhis, Kalash, Siddis, Meos, Nuristanis, Pamiris and various other smaller minorities.

== Refugees ==
Pakistan's census does not include the 1.4 million citizens of Afghanistan who are temporarily residing in Pakistan. The majority of them were born in Pakistan within the last four decades and mostly belong to the Pashtun ethnic group. They also include Tajiks, Uzbeks and others.

== Major ethnic groups ==
Following ethnic groups have a population of at least 1 million as per the 2023 national census.

=== Punjabis ===
Punjabis are an Indo-Aryan ethnolinguistic group native to the Punjab region between India and Pakistan. They are the largest ethnic group of Pakistan. Punjabi Muslims are the third-largest Islam-adhering Muslim ethnicity in the world, globally, after Arabs and Bengalis.

Traditionally, Punjabi identity is primarily linguistic, geographical and cultural. Its identity is independent of historical origin or religion and refers to those who reside in the Punjab region or associate with its population and those who consider the Punjabi language and its dialects as their mother tongue. Integration and assimilation are important parts of Punjabi culture, since Punjabi identity is not based solely on tribal connections.

=== Pashtuns ===
Pashtuns are an Iranic ethnolinguistic group and are Pakistan's second largest ethnicity. They speak Pashto as their first language and are divided into multiple tribes such as Afridi, Durrani, Yousafzai and Khattak, which are notably the main Pashtun tribes in Pakistan. They make up an estimated 38 million of Pakistan's total population and are mostly adherent to Sunni Islam.

=== Sindhis ===
The Sindhis are an Indo-Aryan ethnolinguistic group who speak the Sindhi language and are native to the Sindh province of Pakistan. Sindhis are predominantly Muslim, but have a minority Hindu population, making up the largest Hindu minority population in Pakistan. Sindhi Muslim culture is highly influenced by Sufi doctrines and principles and some of the popular cultural icons of Sindh are Shah Abdul Latif Bhitai, Lal Shahbaz Qalandar, Jhulelal and Sachal Sarmast.

=== Saraikis ===
The Saraikis are an Indo-Aryan ethnolinguistic group inhabiting parts of central and southeastern Pakistan, primarily in the southern part of the Pakistani province of Punjab. They are mainly found in Derajat, a cultural region of central Pakistan, located in the region where the provinces of Punjab, Khyber Pakhtunkhwa, and Balochistan meet. Derajat is bound by the Indus River and the Sulaiman Mountains to the west.

=== Muhajirs ===
Muhajirs (meaning "migrants"), are a collective multiethnic group who emerged through the migration of Indian Muslims from various parts of India to Pakistan starting in 1947, as a result of the world's largest mass migration. The majority of Muhajirs are settled in Sindh mainly in Karachi and Hyderabad. Sizable communities of Muhajirs are also present in cities including Lahore, Multan, Islamabad, Mirpur Khas, Sukkur and Peshawar. The term Muhajir is also used for descendants of Muslims who migrated to Pakistan after the 1947 partition of India. Notable Muhajirs include Liaquat Ali Khan, Abdul Qadeer Khan, Pervez Musharraf, Hakeem Muhammad Saeed and Abdul Sattar Edhi.

=== Baloch ===
The Baloch are an Iranic ethnolinguistic group, and are principally found in the south of Balochistan province of Pakistan. Despite living in the southeastern side towards the Indian subcontinent for centuries, they are classified as a northwestern Iranian people in accordance to their language which belongs to the northwestern subgroup of Iranian languages.

According to Dr. Akhtar Baloch, Professor at University of Karachi, the Balochis migrated from Balochistan during the Little Ice Age and settled in Sindh and Punjab. The Little Ice Age is conventionally defined as a period extending from the sixteenth to the nineteenth centuries or alternatively, from 1300 to 1850, although climatologists and historians working with local records no longer expect to agree on either the start or end dates of this period, which varied according to local conditions. According to Professor Baloch, the climate of Balochistan was very cold and the region was uninhabitable during the winter so the Baloch people migrated in waves and settled in Sindh and Punjab.

=== Hindkowans/Hazarewals ===
Hindkowans, also known as the Hindki, is a contemporary designation for speakers of Hindko dialects of Western Punjabi, primarily living in the Hazara region of northern Pakistan. The origins of the term refer merely to the speakers of Indo-Aryan languages rather than to any particular ethnic group. However, the Hindko-speaking community belonging to the Hazara region of northern Pakistan are recognised collectively as Hazarewal.

=== Brahuis ===
The Brahui, Brahvi or Brohi, are an ethnic group principally found in Balochistan, Pakistan. They speak the Brahui language, which belongs to the Dravidian language family, although ethnically they tend to identify as Baloch.

They are a small minority group in Afghanistan, where they are native, but they are also found in their diaspora in West Asian states. They mainly occupy the area in Balochistan from Bolan Pass through the Bolan Hills to Ras Muari (Cape Monze) on the sea, separating the Baloch people living to the east and west. The Brahuis are almost entirely Sunni Muslims.

=== Meos ===
Meo, also spelled Mayo or occasionally, Mewati, are a Muslim ethnic group originating from the Mewat region of north-western India. During the Partition of India, several Meo were displaced from Alwar and Bharatpur districts in India, mostly settling in Pakistani districts of Sialkot, Lahore, Karachi, Narowal, Dera Ghazi Khan, Sheikhupura, Gujranwala, Multan, Haiderabad and Kasur, among others.

== Other ethnic groups ==
Following ethnolinguistic groups have a population of at least one hundred thousand (100,000), but were not enumerated separately in the 2023 census:

- Shina, native to Gilgit, Diamer, Astore, Ghizer, Ishkoman and eastern Kohistan (500,000 people, 2019 est.)
- Kho, native to Chitral (500,000 people, 2018 est.)
- Balti, native to Baltistan (380,000 people, 2020 est.)
- Indus Kohistani, native to western Kohistan (250,000 people, 2012 est.)
- Torwali, native to Upper Swat Valley (140,000 people, 2021 est.)
- Gawri, native to Kalam and Kumrat valleys (140,000 people, 2025 est.)
- Brusho, native to Hunza-Nagir and Yasin valleys (100,000 people, 2015 est.)
- Khetran, native to Barkhan region of Balochistan (150,000 people, at least 100,000 of whom speak Khetrani, 2017 est.)
- Jadgal, scattered across Balochistan (100,000 people, 1998 census)
- Wakhi, native to Gojal and upper Chitral
- Jamote, native to Kacchi region of Balochistan
- Lasi, native to Lasbela region of Balochistan

== See also ==
- Demographics of Pakistan
- Languages of Pakistan
- Pakistanis
- Indo-Iranic peoples
