= Behrain Tehsil =

Behrain Tehsil تحصیل بحرین
- Tehsil
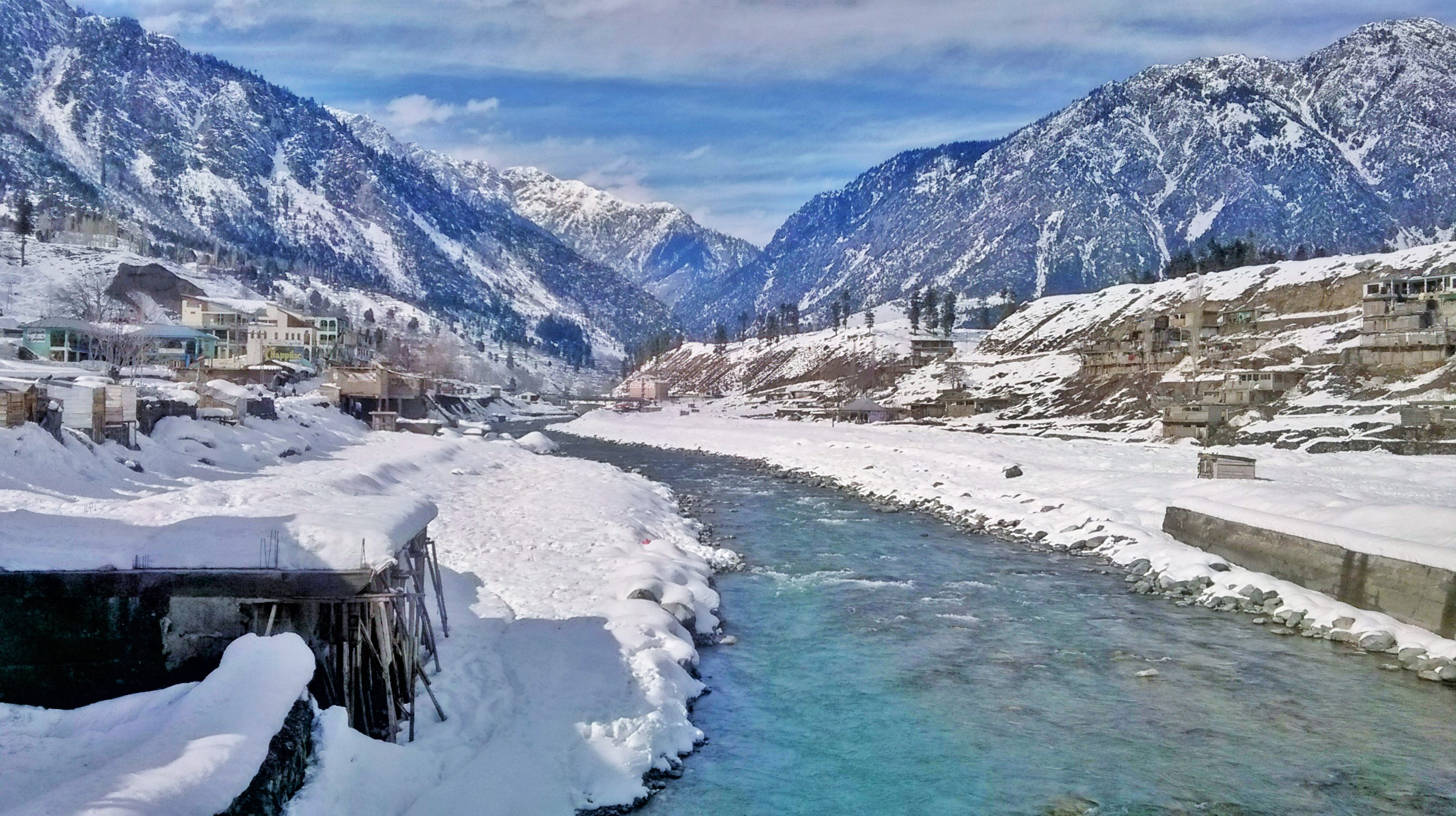
- Kalam Valley in Behrain during winter

- Behrain Tehsil (in green) in Swat District
- Country: Pakistan
- Province: Khyber Pakhtunkhwa
- District: Upper Swat

Area
  - Tehsil: 2,899 km^{2} (1,119 sq mi)

Population (2023)
  - Tehsil: 270,620
  - Urban: 76,725
  - Rural: 193,895
- Time zone: UTC+5 (PST)
  - Summer (DST): UTC+6 (PDT)

Behrain, also known as Upper Swat Valley and Swat Kohistan, is a tehsil located in Upper Swat District, Khyber Pakhtunkhwa, Pakistan. The population is 270,620, according to the 2023 census. Behrain has an area of 2,899 km^{2}, comprising around three-quarters of total area of the district, and is part of the larger Kohistan region. The major towns include Bahrain, Kalam and Madyan.

Behrain is known for alpine valleys such as Kalam and is home to a number of Indigenous Indo-Aryan peoples, including Gujars, Torwalis and Gawris.

== Demographics ==
=== Ethnic groups ===
Major ethnic groups in Behrain tehsil are the Gujars, Torwalis, Pashtuns and Gawris. Torwalis form majority while Pashtuns and Gawris are found in almost equal proportion. Gujars also inhabit several villages including Laikot, Peshmal, Gabral and Serai Badai.

=== Languages ===
Languages of Behrain Tehsil (2023)
1. Kohistani (11.9%)
2. Others, mainly Torwali and Gawri (52.3%)
3. Pashto (35.8%)
4. 0.00%

According to the 2023 Census, the share of Pashto and Kohistani languages in Behrain was 35.81% and 11.88%, respectively. Some 141,119, mainly Torwalis and Gawris, chose "Other", amounting to a little more than 52%. However, these figures have been disputed by the activists based in Behrain, such as Zubair Torwali. According to Torwali the usage of the name 'Kohistani' complicates recording of the accurate linguistic demographics since both Torwali and Gawri languages are sometimes termed as such, along with Indus Kohistani and Shina Kohistani. He estimates the Torwali, Gawri and Gujari-speaking population of the tehsil to be around 100,000, 60,000 and 40,000, respectively.

Other, relatively smaller languages spoken in the Tehsil include Ushojo, Badeshi and Khowar.

== Union councils ==
Behrain consists of 8 Union Councils: Utror, Bahrain, Mankyal, Kalam, Beshigram, Madyan, Tirat and Balakot.

== See also ==
- List of tehsils of Khyber Pakhtunkhwa
- Lower Swat Valley
