= Torwali =

Torwali or Turvali may refer to:

- Torwali language spoken in Khyber Pakhtunkhwa
- Torwali people, who speak the language
