= Thall, Khyber Pakhtunkhwa =

Thall or Thal in Khyber Pakhtunkhwa, Pakistan, may refer to:

- Thall, Hangu District, Khyber Pakhtunkhwa
- Thal, Upper Dir District, Khyber Pakhtunkhwa
