= Zubair Torwali =

Pakistani linguist

- Born: Bahrain, Swat, Pakistan
- Education: Master’s degree(s) in English Literature & Political Science (University of Peshawar)
- Occupations: Researcher; Writer; Activist; Educator; Linguist
- Organization(s): Idara Baraye Taleem-wa-Taraqi (IBT) – Founder & Executive Director
- Known for: Preservation & revitalization of endangered/minority languages (esp. Torwali); civil society leadership; human rights activism
- Notable work: Muffled Voices: Longing for a Pluralist & Peaceful Pakistan (2015); Torwali Alif Be Te (2007); Torwali English Dictionary for Students (2023)
- Awards: Hellman/Hammett Grant (2012)

Zubair Torwali is a Pakistani linguist, educator, and activist, known for his work in preserving and promoting Pakistan's Dardic cultures and languages.

== Early life and education ==
Zubair Torwali graduated from Jahanzeb College in Swat, Pakistan, and completed his master's studies at the University of Peshawar.

== Career ==
Torwali is a [linguist, educator, and community activist, based in Bahrain, Pakistan. His focus is on preserving and promoting Pakistan's Dardic cultures and languages, and has authored and overseen several works about the Torwali people and their culture.

He is also a researcher and public speaker.

Torwali serves as the editor of "We Mountains", a magazine covering the culture of the Pakistani Himalayas, in addition to being the founder of Idara Baraye Taleem-o-Taraqi (I.B.T), an organisation promoting the rights of marginalised language communities of northern Pakistan.

As a writer, he has authored several research papers and articles, including those in Pakistani English dailies and weeklies.

== Other activities ==
Torwali is a member of the Human Rights Commission of Pakistan.

== Recognition and awards ==
Torwali is a Fellow of Japan's 2013 Asian Leadership Fellow Program and was shortlisted for the International Bremen Peace Award in 2015.

Torwali is also a Public Peace Prize laureate "…for his extraordinary commitment to giving a voice to the unheard by helping increase literacy in the indigenous people of Northern Pakistan".

He was awarded the 2012 Hellman-Hammett Grant by Human Rights Watch."

In 2021, I.B.T. , of which Torwali is director, was chosen for the Linguapax International Award.

== Works ==
=== Books ===
- Koo, Edwin; Prüst, Marc; Gouvion Saint-Cyr, Agnès de; Torwali, Zubair; Millet, Raphaël; Koo, Edwin; Koo, Edwin (2013). Paradise Visage (First ed.). Makati, Philippines: Produced by ArtPostAsia Pte. Ltd. ISBN 978-9710579235.
- Torwali, Zubair (2015). Muffled Voices: Longing for a Pluralist and Peaceful Pakistan. Lahore, Pakistan: Multi Line Publications. ISBN 978-9698985066.
- Torwali, Zubair (2019). "Early Writing in Torwali in Pakistan". In Sherris, Ari; Peyton, Joy Kreeft (eds.). Teaching Writing to Children in Indigenous Languages: Instructional Practices from Global Contexts (1 ed.). Routledge. doi:10.4324/9781351049672-3. ISBN 978-1-351-04967-2.
- Mustafa, Zubeida; Rahman, Tariq; Nayyar, A. H., eds. (2021). "Attempting Inclusive Education". Reforming school education in Pakistan & the language dilemma (1st ed.). Karachi: Paramount Books (Ptv.) Ltd. ISBN 978-969-210-234-6.
- Torwali, Zubair (2023). "Using Children's Native Language Repertoire to Develop Literacy Materials: Early Writing in Torwali". In Riitta-Liisa Valijärvi; Lily Kahn (eds.). Teaching and Learning Resources for Endangered Languages. Brill. pp. 327–349. doi:10.1163/9789004544185_019. ISBN 978-90-04-54418-5.
- Torwali, Zubair (2023 December). “Torwali-English Dictionary for Students.” Idara Baraye Taleem wa Taraqi (IBT), Bahrain Swat, Pakistan.
- Torwali, Zubair (2024). Internal Colonization in Northern Pakistan: The Impact on Cultural Rights (PDF). Lahore: Human Rights Commission of Pakistan.

=== Academic journals ===
- Torwali, Zubair (2020). Austin, Peter K. (ed.). "Countering the challenges of globalization faced by endangered languages of North Pakistan". Language Documentation and Description. 17 (0). London: EL Publishing: 44–65. doi:10.25894/ldd96. ISSN 2756-1224.
- Torwali, Zubair (2020) “Adapting the Multilingual Assessment Instrument for Narratives (MAIN) to Torwali”. ZAS Papers in Linguistics 64 (August):241-48.
- Torwali, Zubair (Dec 2021), “The Dards, Dardistan and its linguistic tapestry” Bi-annual research journal, “Pashto” V. 50, Issue 662, Pashto Academy, University of Peshawar, Pakistan.
- Torwali, Zubair (16 December 2022). "The colonisation of Indigenous languages in Pakistan". Te Kaharoa. 15 (1). doi:10.24135/tekaharoa.v15i1.412. ISSN 1178-6035.

=== Articles ===
- Torwali, Zubair (January 2006). "Vestiges of Torwali culture". Idara Braye Taleem-o Taraqi. doi:10.13140/RG.2.1.2272.1049.
- American Pakistan Foundation: Linguistic Diversity in Pakistan, interview of Zubair Torwali
- Aeon Essays: How Dardistan became one of the most multilingual places on Earth by Zubair Torwali
- Torwali, Zubair (16 January 2024). "Torwali Language, Music, and Poetry: An Heirloom of Love from Northern Pakistan". Smithsonian Center for Folklife and Cultural Heritage.
