= Balakot (disambiguation) =

Balakot is a town in Mansehra District in the Khyber Pakhtunkhwa province of Pakistan.

Balakot may also refer to:

== Pakistan ==
- Balakot Tehsil, an administrative subdivision (tehsil) of Mansehra District in Khyber-Pakhtunkhwa, Pakistan
- Balakot, Swat, an administrative unit, known as Union council, of Swat District in Khyber Pakhtunkhwa, Pakistan
- Kot Bala, also known as Balakot, an archaeological site located on the on Makran coast in Lasbela District, Balochistan, Pakistan

== Nepal ==
- Balakot, Nepal, a village development committee in Parbat District in the Dhawalagiri Zone of central Nepal

== See also ==
- Balakote, Jammu and Kashmir, Poonch district, India
- Battle of Balakot, 1831 conflict in the town between Sikhs and Muslims
- 2019 Balakot airstrike, in the town by the Indian Air Force
