= Barikot, Upper Dir =

Barikot
- Union Council
- Location within Khyber Pakhtunkhwa Location within Pakistan
- Coordinates: 35.42913764°N 72.26867619°E
- Country: Pakistan
- Province: Khyber Pakhtunkhwa
- District: Upper Dir
- Time zone: UTC+5 (PST)

Barikot (Gawri and Urdu: بریکوٹ) is a town and Union Council of Upper Dir District in the Khyber Pakhtunkhwa province of Pakistan. It is one of the six towns inhabited by the Gawri people in the Dir Kohistan region of northern Pakistan.

== See also ==
- Rajkot
- Kalkot
- Barikot
