= Habib Ahmad =

Pakistani scientist (died 2021)

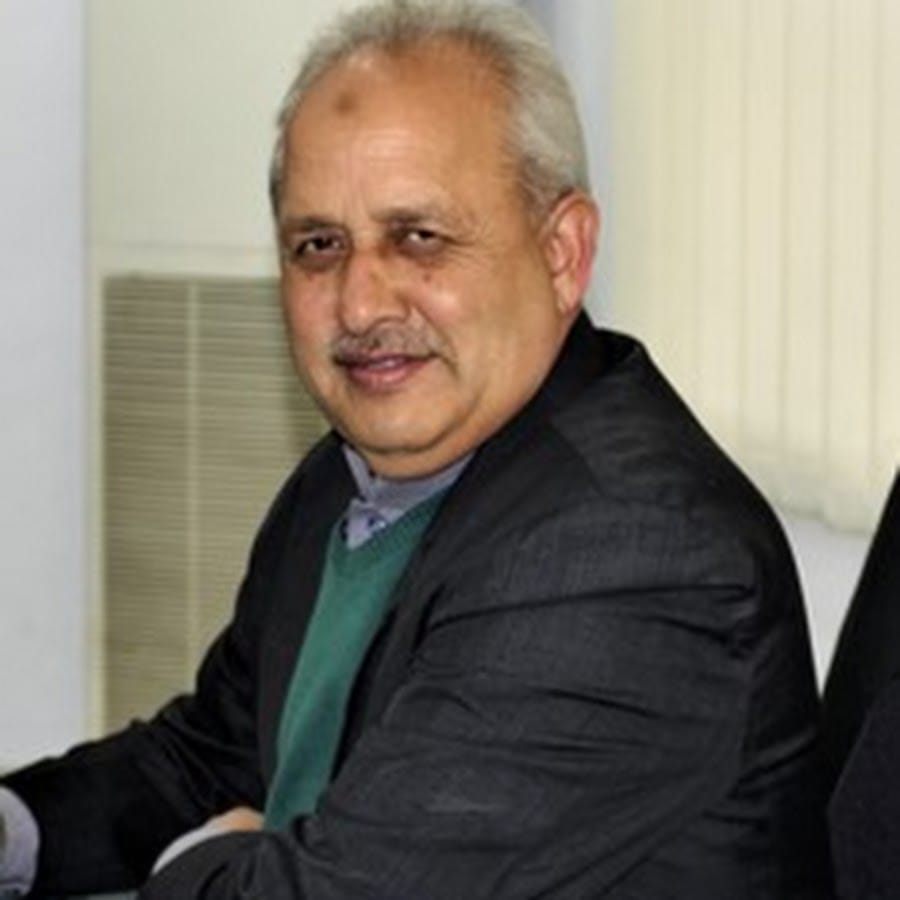
- Born: Matta, Pakistan
- Education: Government Post Graduate Jahanzeb College; University of Peshawar; University of the Punjab
- Scientific career
- Fields: Genetics

Habib Ahmad (1959–2021) was a Pakistani scientist who was a professor of Genetics and vice-chancellor of Islamia College, Peshawar in Peshawar, Pakistan.

== Life ==
Ahmad was born in Matta village in Swat District, Khyber Pakhtunkhwa, Pakistan. He attended Government High School in Matta and passed his matriculation exam in 1975. He graduated from Jahanzeb College in Saidu Sharif in 1981. He then earned an MSc and MPhil in botany from the Department of Botany at the University of Peshawar in 1985 and 1991 respectively, followed by a PhD from the University of the Punjab in 2003. After graduating, he joined Hazara University as a professor in 2005, and has been the vice-chancellor of this university since 28 July 2016.

Ahmad has over three decades of experience in teaching, research and development. He is the author of over ten books and over 200 research papers, with impact on genetics and expanding the collective Pakistani knowledge on the subject.

He also served at the Pakistan Agricultural Research Council in Islamabad, Pakistan. He played a role in the Cytogenetics Program where he contributed to the establishment and strengthening of a Cytogenetics lab.

== Awards ==
- The Government of Pakistan, Civil Award, Tamgha-e-Imtiaz, 23 March 2011
- Leading Scientist of the World Award, 2011, IBC Cambridge, UK
- National Talent Award August, 2008
- Teacher of the Year UNESCO Award, 2007

== Death ==
He died on 7 April 2021 after an ailment for several days.
