= Government Post Graduate Jahanzeb College =

College in Khyber Pakhtunkhwa, Pakistan

Coordinates: 34°45′19.8″N 72°21′26.8″E

- Motto: عَلَّمَ الْإِنسَانَ مَا لَمْ يَعْلَمْ (Arabic)
- Motto in English: He has taught man what he does not know
- Type: Public
- Established: 1952
- Principal: Muhammad Kamal
- Location: Swat, Khyber Pakhtunkhwa, Pakistan
- Campus: Urban
- Journal: Elum
- Nickname: Jahanzebian
- Website: http://www.jc.edu.pk

Government Post Graduate Jahanzeb College is one of the pioneer institutes of higher education in the Swat Valley, Khyber Pakhtunkhwa, Pakistan. It was founded by the ex-ruler of the Swat State in order to provide education to the population of the region. It is located within the Malakand division.

The college offers both arts and science learning opportunities to the students and affiliated with the University of Swat. The college has been built in the shape of "E".

== Inception ==
Miangul Abdul Haq Jahanzeb, the former ruler of Swat State, built a lot of schools in every corner of his domain, including the Jahanzeb College in 1952.

The buildings of Jahanzeb College can be seen in clusters sprawling on both sides of the road that links Mingora to Saidu Sharif.

== Post graduate departments ==
- Department of Computer Science
- Department of Economics
- Department of Botany
- Department of Mathematics:
- Department of Chemistry
- Department of English
- Department of Physics
- Department of Urdu
- Department of Pakistan studies
- Department of History
- Department of Health and physical education
- Department of Islamic studies
- Department of statistics

== Under graduate departments ==
- Department of Computer Science
- Department of Library Science
- Department of Political Science
- Department of Physical Education
- Department of Urdu
- Department of History
- Department of Geography
- Department of Statistics
- Department of Mathematics
- Department of Zoology
- Department of Pakistan Studies
- Department of Physics

== Hostel facilities ==
The college has five hostels which are located in a close proximity to the main building;

- Saidu Hostel: (1953) — Saidu Hostel is a two-storey building with a capacity of 120 boarders for intermediate section.
- Federal Hostel: (1973) — Federal Hostel is also a two-storey building with a capacity of 52 boarders for degree level and located in the neighbourhood of Saidu Hostel.
- Girls Hostel: (2003) — Girls Hostel is also a two-storey building with limited boarders capacity for post-graduate level students.
- Mingora Hostel: (1956) — Mingora Hostel is a three-storey building with a capacity of 200 boarders for postgraduate level students and situated near the Grassy Ground.
- Bachelor's Hostel: ( 1984) — Bachelor's Hostel is also a two-storey building and is reserved for teachers only.

== Notable alumni ==
- Laiq Zada Laiq, Pakistani poet
- Shamim Shahid, Pakistani journalist
- Abdul Matin Khan, ex-MNA
- Habib Ahmad, scientist
- Nasirul Mulk, jurist and politician
- Ziauddin Yousafzai, education activist
- Zubair Torwali, linguist
