= Let Her Fly =

2018 non-fiction book

- Front cover
- Author: Ziauddin Yousafzai
- Subject: Autobiography
- Publisher: W. H. Allen & Co.
- Publication date: 8 November 2018
- Publication place: United States

Let Her Fly: A Father's Journey and the Fight for Equality is a 2018 autobiography by Ziauddin Yousafzai, the father of the Pakistani activist for female education Malala Yousafzai. It details the oppression he saw women face in Pakistan, his family life both before and after his daughter Malala was shot by the Taliban and his attitudes toward being a brother, a husband, and a father.

== Background ==
Ziauddin Yousafzai is a Pakistani education activist. He has three children, a daughter—Malala Yousafzai—and two sons—Khushal and Atal. After writing an anonymous blog for BBC Urdu and being subject to a New York Times documentary Class Dismissed, Malala began gaining a public profile as an advocate for female education and for speaking about the conditions of life under the growing influence of the Taliban. She began receiving death threats, as did her father, and on 9 October 2012, a member of the Taliban shot Malala as she was taking a bus from school to her home. Her continuing activism led her to become the youngest Nobel Prize laureate at the age of 17 by winning the 2014 Nobel Peace Prize. In 2013, Yousafzai co-wrote the memoir I Am Malala with Christina Lamb.

Ziauddin Yousafzai said that I Am Malala covered "one part of [his] life, a daughter's father", and Let Her Fly was written to detail other parts such as being "the brother of five sisters who had never been to school, the husband of a wife and the father of two sons". He described it as following a "transformation" from "a member of a patriarchal society" to his present self. Yousafzai said that the title "means let every girl fly, in every corner of the world". It originated from his answer to the common question of what he did to raise a successful daughter: "ask what I did not do. I did not clip her wings. I let her be herself". The book was published on 8 November 2018 by W. H. Allen & Co.

== Synopsis ==
As a child, Yousafzai had a stammer, was dark-skinned and not from a wealthy family; he was bullied at school. His imam father, who believed in the importance of male education, was disappointed that he did not become a doctor. Yousafzai had two particularly formative experiences with women's oppression in his childhood: a cousin of his was shot after leaving an abusive husband; and a girl in his village was murdered in an honour killing for loving a boy her family disapproved of. The book quotes a poem Yousafzai wrote aged 20, addressed to a hypothetical future daughter of his.

Yousafzai pursued a master's degree and began a relationship with his future wife, Toor Pekai. He aimed for his wife to have more freedom and equality than most wives in his community. With around ₨15,000 (£100), he founded a school which began with only three students. His focus was on girls' education. He worked in a large primary school and high schools; with his daughter, he would travel and talk about the value of female schooling. After Malala was shot, she was taken to a hospital in the United Kingdom, where the family had to remain. Yousafzai found it difficult to raise his sons in the UK, viewing them as less obedient than he was as a child, but he became gradually less controlling of them.

== Reception ==
Daily Times's Shama Junejo recommended the book for all audiences, but particularly young girls and "those who believe that behind every great feminist woman there is always a great father, husband, brother or a son". In a review jointly published by Cape Times and Pretoria News, a writer lauded that the book has a "monumental" impact and will "inspire, move and enlighten" a "broad readership". The reviewer had "tears of awe, joy and admiration" while reading. The Hindu summarised: "Told through intimate portraits of each of Mr. Ziauddin's closest relationships ... the book looks at what it means to love, to have courage and fight for what is inherently right". Caitlin Fitzsimmons of The Sydney Morning Herald praised it as "an engaging read".

== Translations ==
- French: Ce que l'amour m'a appris, lit. 'What Love Taught Me'. Translated by Fabien Thomas. Neuilly-sur-Seine: Michel Lafon. 2018. ISBN 9782749937908.
- Italian: Libera di volare, lit. 'Free to Fly'. Translated by Sara Caraffini. Garzanti. 2019. ISBN 9788811605195.
- Spanish: Libre para volar, lit. 'Free to Fly'. Translated by Julia Fernández. Madrid: Alianza Editorial. 2019. ISBN 9788491815952.
