= Gawri language =

Indo-Aryan language spoken in Pakistan

Gawri
- Kalami, Bashkarik, Kohistani
- کالامی گاؤری; Gāwrī, Kālāmī
- Native to: Pakistan
- Region: Khyber Pakhtunkhwa
- Ethnicity: Gawri people
- Native speakers: (141,560 cited 2025) (100,000 cited 2000)
- Language family: Indo-European: Indo-Iranian; Indo-Aryan; Dardic; Kohistani; Gawri
- Writing system: Arabic script

Language codes
- ISO 639-3: gwc
- Glottolog: kala1373
- ELP: Kalami
- Linguasphere: 59-AAC-c

Gawri (گاؤری), also known as Kalami, Kalam Kohistani and Bashkarik, is an Indo-Aryan language of Kohistani group spoken by the Gawri people in the upper Swat and Panjkora valleys of northern Pakistan. It is most closely related to the Torwali language of Swat Valley.

== Classification and names ==
In the older linguistic literature, the language has been referred to as Bashkarik, Garwi or Gawri. According to its classification, Gawri belongs to the Kohistani subgroup of the north-western zone of Indo-Aryan languages, along with several closely related languages in its geographical vicinity: Torwali, Indus Kohistani, Bateri, Chilisso, and several other languages spoken in the Kohistan region of Pakistan. It is one of about thirty languages that are spoken in the mountain areas of northern Pakistan. Together with a range of other north-western Indo-Aryan mountain languages, these languages are sometimes collectively referred to as ‘Dardic languages.

== Geographic distribution and population ==
Gawri is spoken in the Swat Kohistan region of Upper Swat District and in the Dir Kohistan region of Upper Dir District, Khyber Pakhtunkhwa, Pakistan. It is predominantly spoken in the valleys of Kalam, Usho and Utror in the Upper Swat District, and the six towns of Barikot, Rajkot, Biar, Kalkot, Thal, and Lamuti of the Kumrat Valley in the Upper Dir District.

Collectively, the two Gawri-speaking communities comprise 141,560 people as of a 2025 estimate, of whom 35% are younger than the age of 15.

== Phonology ==
=== Vowels ===
	Front	Back
Close	i	u
Mid	e	o
Open	a	ɑ

Length (/ː/) and nasalization (/ ̃/) are probably contrastive for all vowels.

=== Consonants ===
		Labial	Dental	Retroflex	Palatal	Velar	Uvular	Glottal
Nasal		m	n	ɳ		ŋ		
Stop	voiceless	p	t	ʈ		k	(q)	
Stop	voiced	b	d	ɖ		ɡ		
Stop	aspirated	pʰ	tʰ	ʈʰ		kʰ		
Affricate	plain		ts	tʂ	tʃ			
Affricate	aspirated		tsʰ	tʂʰ	tʃʰ			
Affricate	voiced				dʒ			
Fricative	voiceless	(f)	s	ʂ	ʃ	x		h
Fricative	voiced		z			ɣ		
Lateral	voiceless		ɬ					
Lateral	voiced		l					
Approximant					j	w		
Flap			ɾ	ɽ				

/q f z x ɣ/ occur mainly in loanwords. /q f/ tend to be replaced by /x p/, respectively.

After the front vowels /i e a/, the velars /k ɡ ŋ/ are palatalized: [kʲ ɡʲ ŋʲ].

=== Tone ===
Gawri has contrastive tones.

== Alphabet ==
Gawri uses the Arabic script. The Gawri alphabet has 43 letters: all 39 letters of the Urdu alphabet plus 4 additional letters. One feature of the Gawri alphabet not found in Urdu is that it places the letter ھ as the last letter of the alphabet, preceded by ے. All the 4 additional letters used in Gawri are also found in Gawar-Bati language.

Letter	ا	ب	پ	ت	ٹ	ث	ج	چ	ڄ	څ	ح	خ	د	ڈ	ذ	ر	ڑ	ز	ژ	س	ش	ݭ	ص
Transliteration	∅/ā/ǟ	b	p	t	ṭ	s	j	č	ĉ	c	h	x	d	ḍ	z	r	ṛ	z	ž	s	š	ṣ	s
IPA	[∅], [aː], [æː]	[b]	[p]	[t]	[ʈ]	[s]	[d͡ʒ]	[tʃ]	[ʈ͡ʂ]	[t͡s]	[h]	[x]	[d]	[ɖ]	[z]	[r]	[ɽ]	[z]	[ʒ]	[s]	[ʃ]	[ʂ]	[s]
Name	اٞلِف (älif)	بے (bē)	پے (pē)	تے (tē)	ٹے (ṭē)	ثے (sē)	جِیم (jīm)	چے (čē)	ڄے (ĉē)	بَڑِی حے (hē)	خے (xē)	دَال (dāl)	ڈَال (ḍāl)	ذَال (zl)	رے (re)	ڑے (ṛe)	زے (ze)	ژے (že)	سِین (sīn)	شِین (šīn)	ݭِین (ṣīn)	صوَاد (swād)	
Letter	ض	ط	ظ	ع	غ	ف	ق	ک	گ	ل	ݪ	م	ن	ں	و	ہ	ء	ی	ے	ھ			
Transliteration	z	t	z	ʼ	ğ	f	q	k	g	l	ł	m	n	˜	w/ū/ō	h	ʼ	y/ī/ē	ē	-h			
IPA	[z]	[t]	[z]	[ʔ]	[ɣ]	[f]	[q]	[k]	[ɡ]	[l]	[ɬ]	[m]	[n]	[˜]	[w], [uː], [oː]	[h]	[ʔ]	[j], [iː], [eː]	[eː]	[ʰ]			
Name	ضوَاد (zwād)	طوے (tōē)	ظوے (zōē)	عٞن (ʼän)	غین (ğän)	فے (fē)	قَاف (qāf)	کٞاف (kǟf)	گٞاف (gǟf)	لٞام (lǟm)	ݪٞام (łǟm)	مِیم (mīm)	نُون (nūn)	نُون غُنّہ (nūn ğunna)	وَاؤ (wāʼō)	چھوٹِی حے (čhōṭī he)	ءٞمزَہ (hämza)	چھوٹِی یے (čhōṭī ye)	بَڑِی یے (baṛī ye)	دُوچٞشمِی ہے (dūčäšmī hē			

There are 7 Aspirated consonants represented by digraphs with the letter ھ:

- پھ (ph)
- تھ (th)
- ٹھ (ṭh)
- چھ (čh)
- ڄھ (ĉh)
- څھ (ch)
- کھ (kh)

The sounds /k/ and /g/ are palatalized before Front vowels. There are 3 digraphs with the letter ن:

- نڈ (nḍ) pronounced /ɳɖ/
- نڑ (nṛ): pronounced /ɽ/
- نگ (ng): pronounced /ŋ/ and palatalized before front vowels.

=== Vowels ===
Gawri language has 12 vowels (6 short and 6 long). They are:

- /a/ (a)
- /aː/ (ā)
- /æ/ (ä)
- /æː/ (ǟ)
- /i/ (i)
- /iː/ (ī)
- /u/ (u)
- /uː/ (ū)
- /e/ (e)
- /eː/ (ē)
- /o/ (o)
- /oː/ (ō)

8 of these vowels (a, ā, i, ī, u, ū, ē, ō) have the same orthography as in Urdu. The vowel ä (/æ/) is written with a Zabar with two dots (ٞ) and the long version ǟ as ٞا (آٞ at the beginning of a word).

Short e and o are represented by و, ی or ے followed by ۡ.

Unlike in Urdu where vowel diacritics are optional, in Gawri they are mandatory.

=== Tones ===
Gawri is a tonal language. It has 6 tones:

- level tone: unmarked.
- High tone: represented by ٝ, romanized with acute accent.
- High Falling tone: represented by ٛ, romanized with circumflex.
- low falling tone: represented by ٔ, romanized with Caron.
- Low tone: represented by ۧ, romanized with grave accent.
- Rising tone: represented by ٚ, romanized with ◌̚.

== Grammar ==
=== Syntax ===
The default sentence order is SOV, but this can be changed for emphasis.

=== Morphology ===
Approximately 50% of Gawri words can not be broken down to smaller morphological forms. Of the other half, most words are made up of about two to three morphemes. This language implements many modifications to the stem as opposed to using distinct morpheme additions. For example, many plural words are formed by changing the stem of words as opposed to modifying with a plural morpheme.

	Word	Meaning
masc. sg.	yant	‘is coming’
masc. pl.	yänt	'are coming’
fem.	yent	‘is coming, are coming’

Words can also be modified by suffixes and prefixes.

Word	Meaning
gā	‘went’
gāt	'has gone’
gās̆	‘had gone’

== See also ==
- Indus Kohistani language
- Khowar
- Kohistani Shina
