= Tirat Valley =

Valley in Pakistan

Coordinates: 35.1182°N 72.5065°E

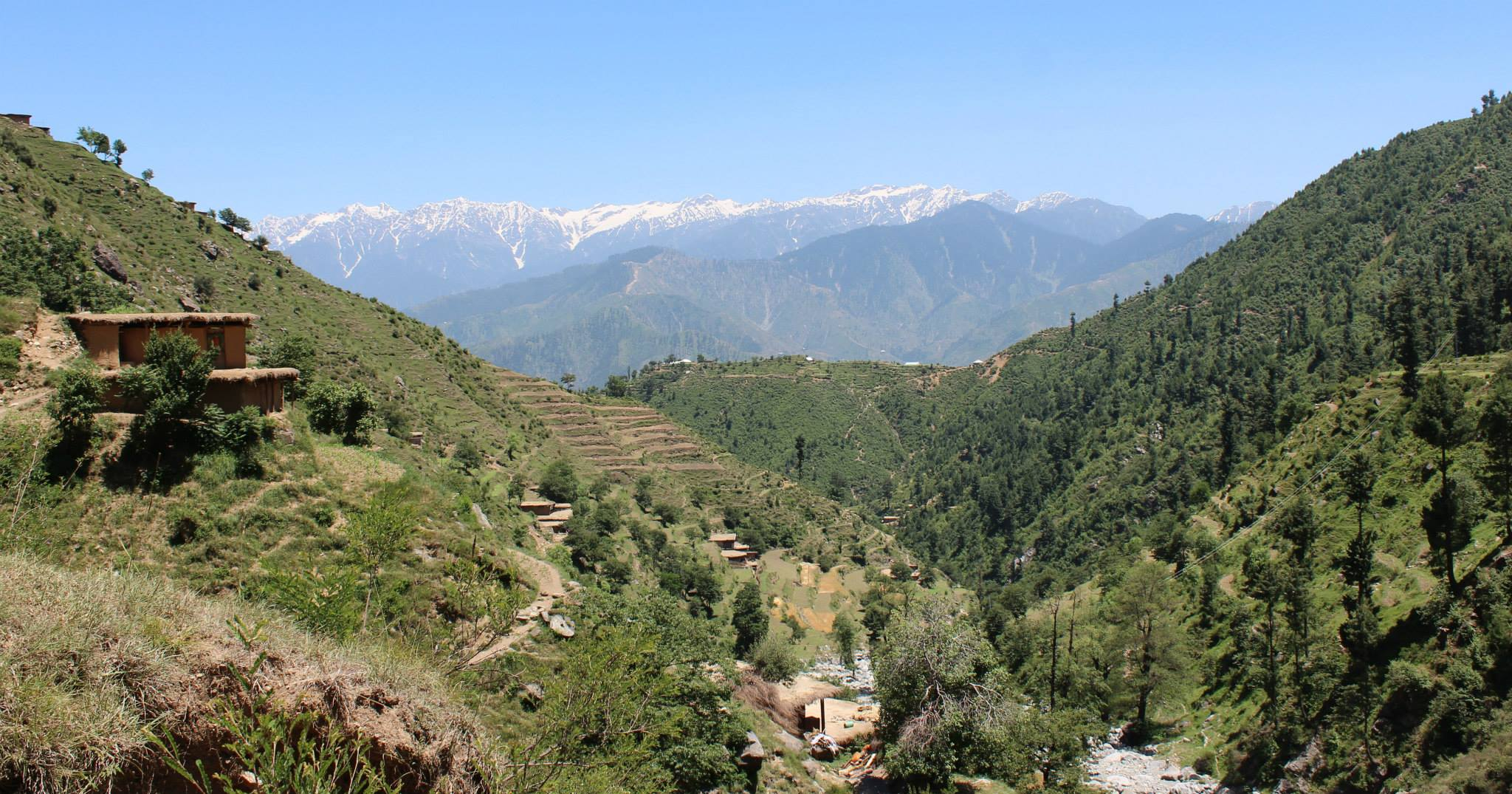
Tirat Valley

Tirat Valley is located in Upper Swat District, Khyber Pakhtunkhwa, Pakistan.

Tirat is located at about 3 kilometers from Madyan (a hill station), which is connected by roads at Ranzra bridge. As a whole, Tirat is the name of a complete Union Council, but the specific village Tirat is the heart of the upper Swat. Tirat village can be recognised by the great minar of the Jamia Masjid.
