= Torwali language =

Indo-Aryan language spoken in Pakistan

Torwali
- توروالی
- Torwali written in Perso-Arabic in Nastaliq style.
- Region: Swat District
- Ethnicity: Torwali people
- Native speakers: 130,000 (2020)
- Language family: Indo-European: Indo-Iranian; Indo-Aryan; Dardic; Kohistani; Torwali
- Writing system: Arabic script (primarily Nastaliq)

Language codes
- ISO 639-3: trw
- Glottolog: torw1241
- ELP: Torwali
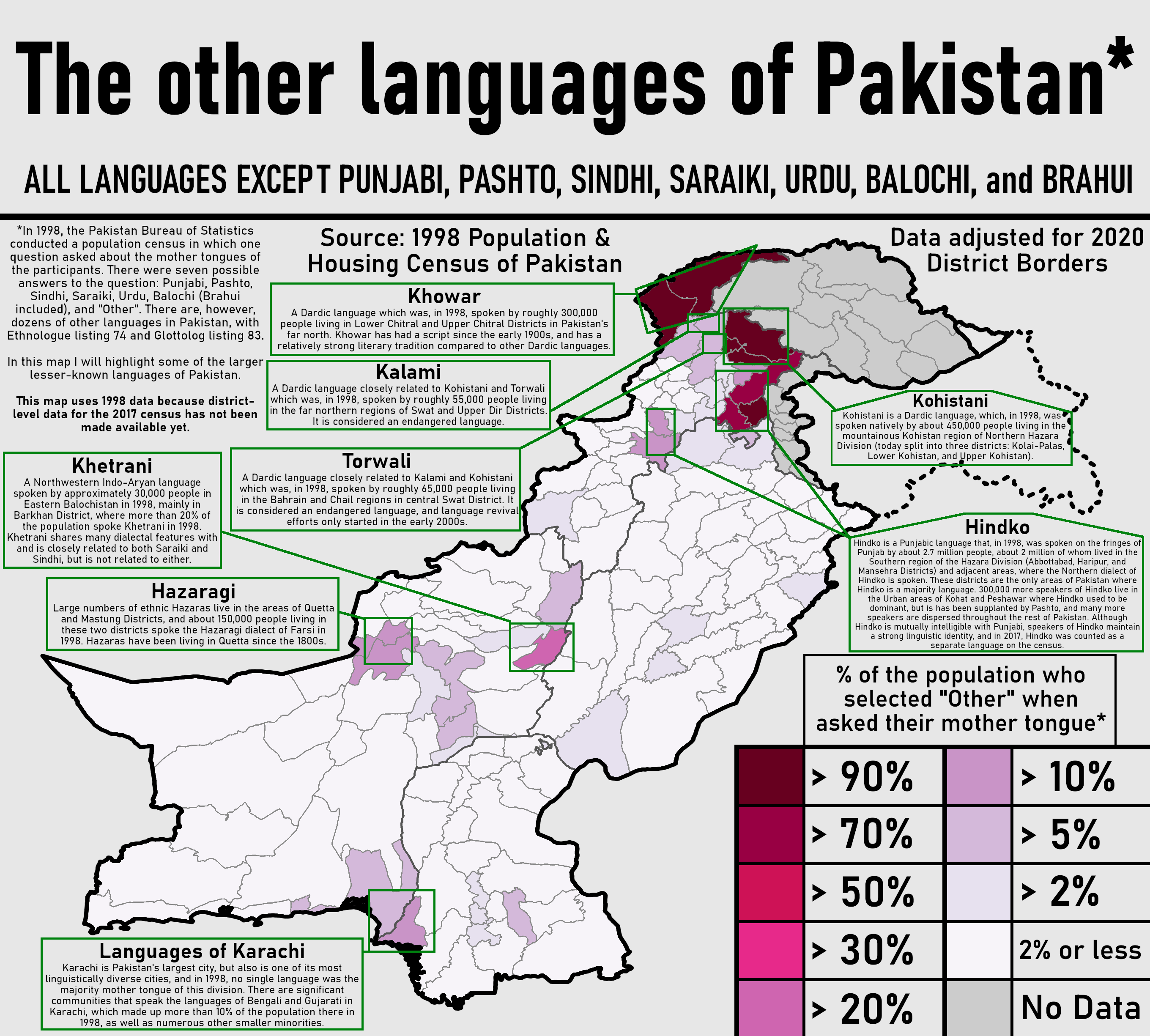
- Torwali is a minor language of Pakistan which is mainly spoken by Torwali nation of Central Swat District, it is given a space in this map.

Torwali (توروالی), also known as Bahrain Kohistani, is an Indo-Aryan language of Kohistani group spoken by the Torwali people in the upper Swat Valley of northern Pakistan. It is most closely related to the Gawri language of Swat and Panjkora valleys.

It has been proposed to be the closest modern Indo-Aryan language still spoken today to Niya dialect of Gāndhārī, a Middle Indo-Aryan language spoken in the ancient region of Gandhara. Torwali is an endangered language; it is characterised as "vulnerable" by the Catalogue of Endangered Languages. There have been efforts to revitalise the language since 2004, and mother tongue community schools have been established by Idara Baraye Taleem wa Taraqi (Institute for Education and Development) (IBT).

== Classification and names ==
The words "Kohistan" (lit. land of mountains) and "Kohistani" (lit. language or people of Kohistan) are generic terms. Kohistani can thus refer to any of about a dozen Kohistani languages spoken in the Kohistan region of Pakistan, the subgroup to which Torwali belongs. Joan Baart is the only author to use the term "Bahrain Kohistani" for the Torwali language. Ethnologue, 27th edition suggests Kohistani, Torwalak, Torwalik and Turvali as alternative names for the language while Torwali as an autonym for it.

== Geographic distribution and population ==
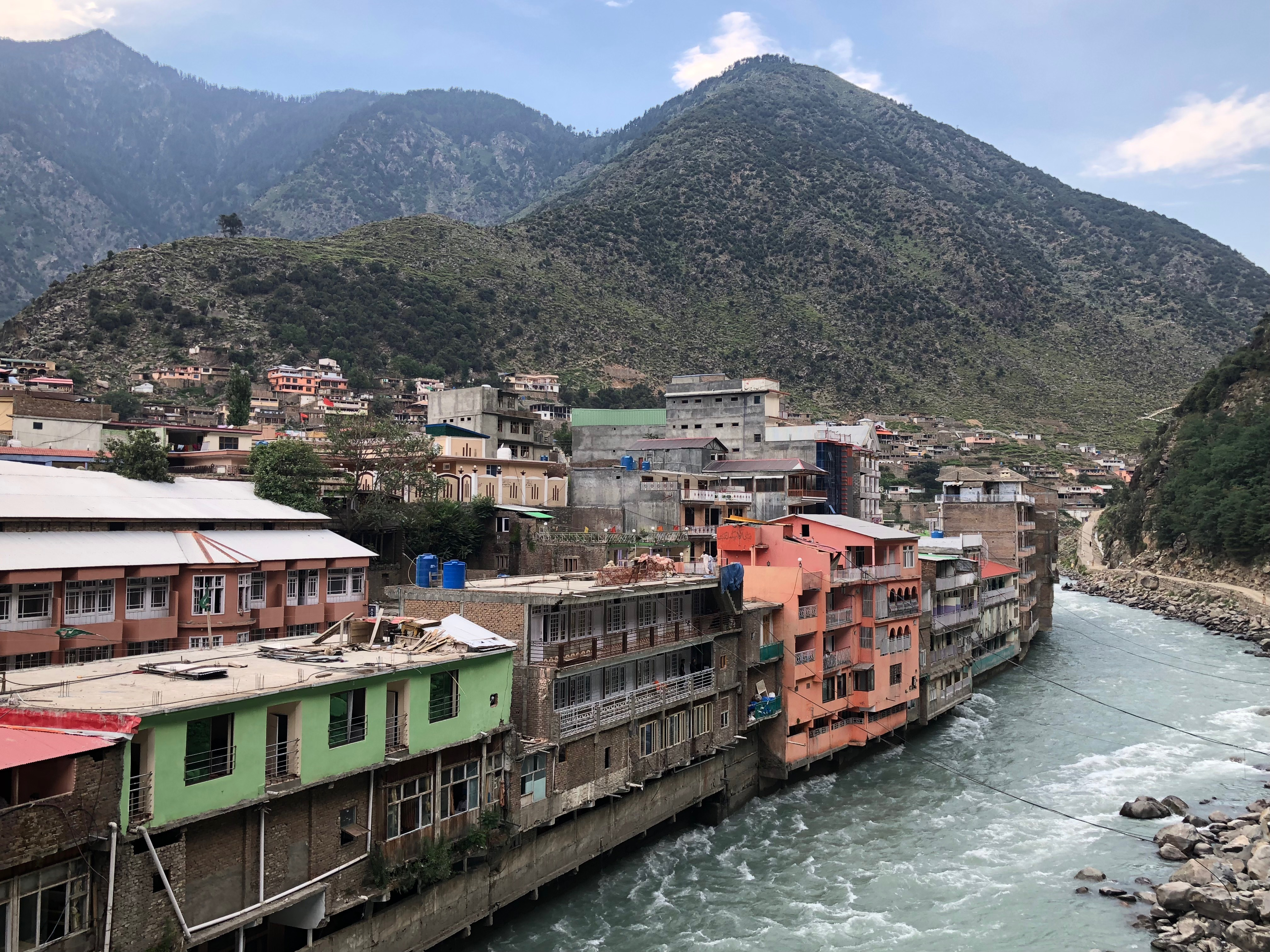
Bahrain, the main town of the Torwali community

Torwali is spoken in the Bahrain and Chail areas of the Swat Kohistan region. It is divided into two main dialects, Sinkaen or Bahrain, spoken northwards from Bahrain upto Peshmal along the Swat River, and Chail, spoken in the Chail Valley. The two valleys are separated from each other by Madyan, a Pashto speaking town. Bahrain is the main centre for the speakers of first dialect, constituting about 80–85% of all Torwali speakers, while Madyan is the main centre for speakers of Chail. Further north it is in contact with Gawri and Gujari speakers.

The population of Torwali speakers was estimated to be 20,000 by Biddulph (1880), 60,000 by Rensch (1992), 80,000 by Lunsford (2001), 120,000 by Z. Torwali (2014), and 140,000 by M. Torwali and Troy (2021).

80 years old man Manjaur Khan sings in Torwali

== Phonology ==
Although descriptions of Torwali phonology have appeared in the literature, some questions still remain unanswered.

=== Vowels ===
Vowels According to Edelman
	Front	Central	Back
Close	i iː		u uː
Mid	e eː		o oː
Open		a aː	

Edelman's analysis, which was based on Grierson and Morgenstierne, shows nasal counterparts to at least /e o a/ and also found a series of central (reduced?) vowels, transcribed as: ⟨ä⟩, ⟨ü⟩, ⟨ö⟩.

Vowels According to Lunsford
	Front	Central	Back
Close	i ĩ	(ɨ̙)	u ũ
Mid	e ẽ (e̙)	ə (ə̙)	o õ
Open	æ æ̃		a ã

Lunsford had some difficulty determining vowel phonemes and suggested there may be retracted vowels with limited distribution: /ɨ/ (which may be [i̙]), /e̙/, /ə̙/. Retracted or retroflex vowels are also found in Kalash-mondr.

=== Consonants ===
The phonemic status of the breathy voiced series is debatable.

Sounds with particularly uncertain status are marked with a superscript question mark.

	Labial		Coronal		Retroflex		Post-alv./ Palatal		Velar		Glottal
Nasal		m		n		(ɳ)				ŋ	
Stop	p pʰ	b bʱ	t tʰ	d dʱ	ʈ ʈʰ	ɖ ɖʱ			k kʰ	g ɡʱ	
Affricate			ts		ʈʂ ʈʂʰ	ɖʐ	tʃ tʃʰ	dʒ			
Fricative (Lateral)			s	z	ʂ	ʐ	ʃ	ʒ	x	ɣ	h
Fricative (Lateral)			(t)ɬ^{?}								
Approximant (Lateral)								j		w	
Approximant (Lateral)				l							
Rhotic				r		ɽ^{?}					

== Alphabet ==
The Torwali language does not have a fixed orthography. The existing and widely used Torwali Character set was proposed by Inam Ullah, who proposed representations for unique sounds in Torwali language which later received official designations from the Unicode with the support of University of Chicago in 2005.

The Torwali orthography was developed by Idara Baraye Taleem wa Taraqi (IBT) i.e. institute for education and development from 2005–2008 wherein text books for children were developed along with the Alphabet book and primer in Torwali under the Mother Tongue Based Multilingual Education program by the abovementioned organisation.

=== Letters ===
The Torwali alphabet has 46 letters. It uses all 39 letters of the Urdu alphabet plus 6 additional letters.

Letter	ا	ب	پ	ت	ٹ	ث	ج	ݲ	چ	ڇ	ح	خ	څ	ځ	د	ڈ	ذ	ر	ڑ	ز	ژ	ڙ	س
Transliteration	[∅/a/ə]	b	p	t	ṭ	s	j	j̣	č	c̣	h	x	c	dz	d	ḍ	z	r	ṛ	z	ž	ẓ	s
IPA	[∅/a/ä/ǝ/ʔ]	[b]	[p]	[t]	[ʈ]	[s]	[d͡ʒ]	[dʐ]	[tʃ]	[ʈ͡ʂ]	[h]	[x]	[t͡s]	[d͡z]	[d]	[ɖ]	[z]	[r~ɾ]	[ɽ]	[z]	[ʒ]	[ʐ]	[s]
Name	الف (alif)	بے (be)	پے (pe)	تے (te)	ٹے (ṭe)	ثے (se)	جیم (jim)	ݲیم (j̣im)	چے (če)	ڇے (c̣e)	حے (he)	خے (xe)	څے (ce)	ځے (dze)	دال (dal)	ڈال (ḍal)	ذال (zal)	رے (re)	ڑے (ṛe)	زے (ze)	ژے (že)	ڙے (ẓe)	سین (sin)
Letter	ش	ݜ	ص	ض	ط	ظ	ع	غ	ف	ق	ک	گ	ل	م	ن	ں	ݨ	و	ہ	ھ	ء	ی	ے
Transliteration	š	ṣ	s	z	t	z	ʔ	ǧ	f	q	k	g	l	m	n	˜	ṇ	w/u/o	h	-h	ʔ	y/i	e
IPA	[ʃ]	[ʂ]	[s]	[z]	[t]	[z]	[ʔ]	[ɣ]	[f]	[q]	[k]	[ɡ]	[l]	[m]	[n]	[˜]	[ɳ]	[w], [u], [o]	[h]	[ʰ]	[ʔ]	[j], [i]	[e]
Name	شین (šin)	ݜین (ṣin)	صواد (swad)	ضواد (zwad)	طوے (toe)	ظوے (zoe)	عین (ʔayn)	غین (ǧayn)	فے (fe)	قاف (qaf)	کاف (kaf)	گاف (gaf)	لام (lam)	میم (mim)	نون (nun)	نون غنّہ (nun ǧunna)	ݨون (ṇun)	واؤ (waʔo)	چھوٹی حے (čhoṭi he)	دو چشمی حے (du čašmi he)	ہمزہ (hamza)	چھوٹی یے (čhoṭi ye)	بڑی یے (baṛi ye)

There are 16 aspirated consonants in Torwali represented by digraphs with the letter ھ:

- بھ (bh)
- پھ (ph)
- تھ (th)
- ٹھ (ṭh)
- جھ (jh)
- چھ (čh)
- ڇھ (c̣h, ĉh)
- دھ (dh)
- ڈھ (ḍ)
- رھ (rh)
- ڑھ (ṛh)
- کھ (kh)
- گھ (gh)
- لھ (lh)
- مھ (mh)
- نھ (nh)

There is also another digraph, نگ, (transliterated in Latin script as ng), and it represents the sound /ŋ/. The letter ے is used for the /e/ sound, and can also appear at the middle of a word, unlike in Urdu where it appears only at the end of a word. The letters ځ and ݨ are used in Pashto loanwords (ݨ for Pashto ڼ), while the letters ث, ح, ذ, ز, ص, ض, ط, ظ, ع, ف and ق are only used in loanwords from Urdu, Arabic and Persian. Torwali also uses the letter ٲ for the /æ/ sound, at the beginning, middle or end of word, and is transliterated æ in Latin script. This letter is not part of the Alphabetical order. The letter ا can represent both /a/ (also represented by zabar / fatha َ) or /ə/.

== Grammar ==
=== Syntax ===
The default sentence order is SOV in the Torwali language.

== See also ==
- Indus Kohistani language
- Khowar
- Kohistani Shina

== Bibliography ==
- Biddulph, John (1880). "Tribes of the Hindukush".
- Grierson, George Abraham (1929). Torwali: An Account of a Dardic Language of the Swat Kohistan. Asian Educational Services. ISBN 978-81-206-1605-9.
- Ullah, Inam (2004). "Lexical database of the Torwali Dictionary", paper presented at the Asia Lexicography Conference, Chiangmai, Thailand, 24–26 May.
- Endangered Languages Project; http://www.endangeredlanguages.com/lang/3501/guide
- SoundCloud https://soundcloud.com/zubairtorwali/sets/manjoora-torwali-melodies
- Library of Congress https://books.google.com/books?id=JHLalS4Jp1oC&dq=Torwali&pg=PA7522
- Jalal Uddin https://paperswithcode.com/paper/a-step-towards-torwali-machine-translation-an
- Torwali, Zubair (2015). Muffled voices: longing for a pluralist & peaceful Pakistan. Multi Line Publications. ISBN 978-969-8985-06-6.
- Ahmad, Aftab (2015) Torvālī Urdū, angrezī lug̲h̲at = Torwali-Urdu-English dictionary https://trove.nla.gov.au/version/243822077
