= Laiq Zada Laiq =

Pakistani Pashto poet (1959–2023)

Layaq Zada Layaq
- Born: Laiq Zada Laiq; 15 January 1959; Madyan, Swat, Khyber Pakhtunkhwa, West Pakistan, Pakistan
- Died: 30 October 2023 (aged 64); Peshawar, Khyber Pakhtunkhwa, Pakistan
- Education: University of Peshawar; University of Karachi
- Occupations: Poet, Fiction Writer, Dramatist, Director of All Pakistan Radio
- Employer(s): Radio Pakistan, Peshawar
- Awards: Tamgha-e-Imtiaz; Kamal-e-Fun Award (2021)

Laiq Zada Laiq (Pashto: لائق زادہ لائق; 15 January 1959 – 30 October 2023) was a Pakistani Pashto-language poet, fiction writer, and dramatist from Madyan, Swat, Khyber Pakhtunkhwa. He served as the director of All Pakistan Radio and authored more than 500 radio plays, 12 TV plays, 120 stories, and 38 books. Laiq was a recipient of the Tamgha-e-Imtiaz and the Kamal-e-Fun Award in 2021, the highest literary honour in Pakistan. His contributions to Pashto literature have left a lasting impact and he is remembered for his significant contributions to the field.

== Biography ==
Laiq graduated from Jahanzeb College Swat, and received a master's degree in Urdu and Pashto literature from the University of Peshawar, and in political science from the University of Karachi. He also served as the Director Programs Radio Pakistan from 2017 until his retirement. Laiq wrote more than 500 radio plays and 12 TV plays. He also authored 120 stories and 36 books. His contribution to Pashto literature is widely recognized by the Pashtoon community across the globe.

== Death ==
Laiq died of a heart attack in Peshawar, on 30 October 2023, at the age of 64. President of the Pakistan Academy of Letters, Najiba Arif, CEO of AVT Khyber Kamran Hamid Raja, political leaders, and the Pashto literary community expressed their deep sorrow over Laiq's death.

== Awards and recognition ==
Laiq was the recipient of the Tamgha-e-Imtiaz. In recognition of his outstanding contribution to Pashto literature, he was awarded the Kamal Fan Award in 2021, Pakistan's highest literary award.
