= Ziauddin Yousafzai =

Pakistani education activist (born 1969)

- ضیاء الدین یوسفزئی
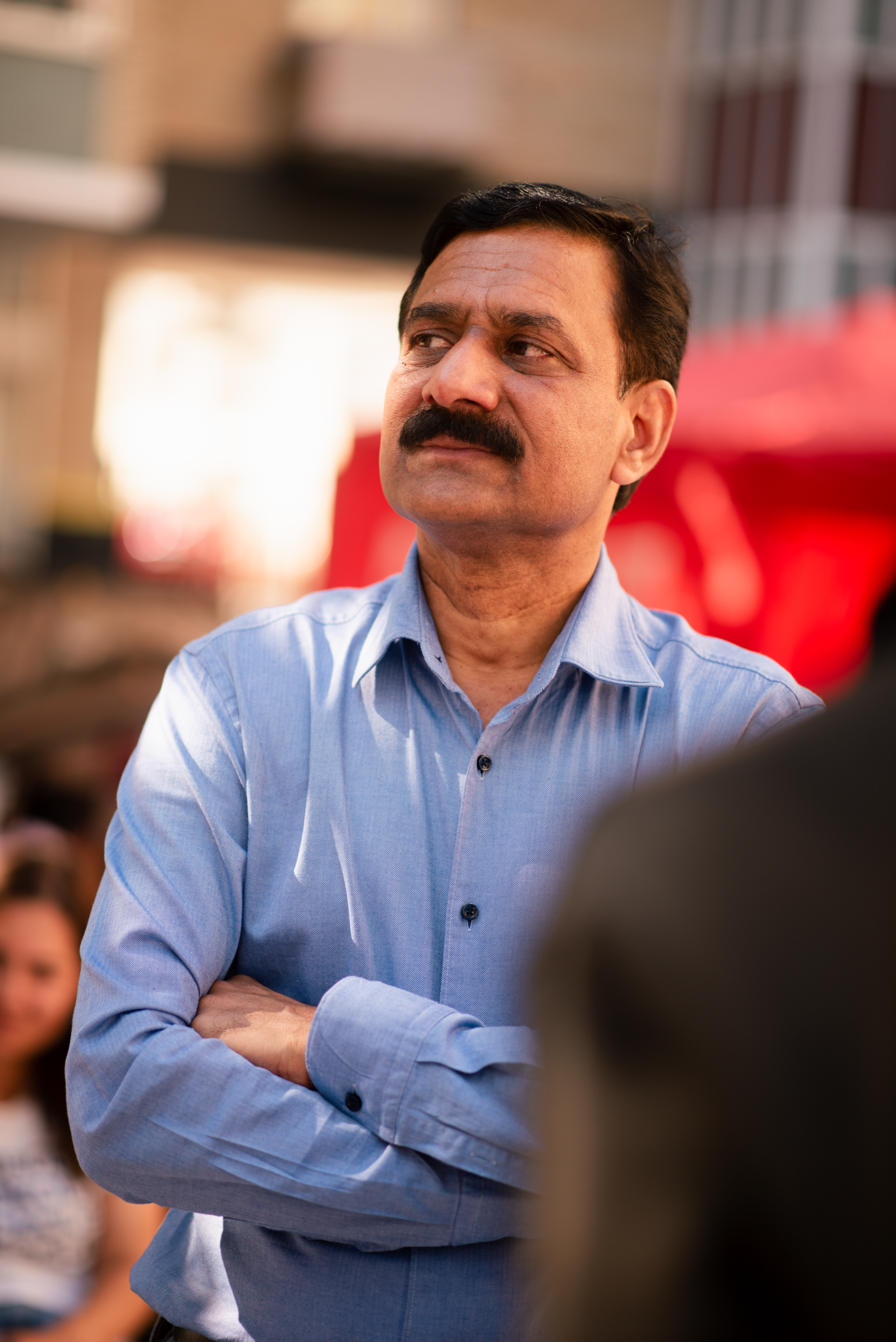
- Yousafzai in 2023
- Born: 20 April 1969 (age 57); Shangla, NWFP, Pakistan
- Education: Jahanzeb College
- Occupations: Education activist Co-founder and Board Member of Malala Fund
- Political party: Awami National Party
- Spouse: Tor Pekai Yousafzai
- Children: 4, including Malala

Ziauddin Yousafzai (Urdu: ضیاء الدین یوسفزئی; Pashto: ضیاالدین یوسفزی; born 20 April 1969) is a Pakistani educational entrepreneur and activist best known as the father of Nobel laureate Malala Yousafzai, who protested against the Tehrik-i-Taliban Pakistan's opposition to the education rights of girls, especially for Pakistani girls.

He is currently co-founder and board member of Malala Fund and the author of Let Her Fly (2018).

== Biography ==
=== Early childhood ===
Yousafzai was born in 1969 to a Pashtun family in Shangla. Ziauddin's father was the orator Rohul Amin, who was also a teacher of theology at a government high school and imam of the local mosque.

As teacher he co-founded and ran a chain of low-cost private schools known as the Khushal Public School, named after a famous Pashtun poet, Khushal Khan Khattak, as well as being a member of the Rotary Club of Swat and elected Vice President of the Swat Association of Private Schools. Politically, he was and remains affiliated with the Awami National Party, a socialist party.

=== Education ===
Ziauddin drew inspiration from his father, an educational activist. Even though he had a stutter, he wanted to prove to his parents that he would be able to learn and speak correctly.

Ziauddin Yousafzai attended Jahanzeb College located in Swat, Pakistan. During his time in college, he was made general secretary of the Pashtun Students Federation (PSF), a student wing of the Awami National Party which is a socialist party. Yousafzai graduated from Jahanzeb College with a Master's in English.

=== Mission ===
When his daughter, Malala, was old enough to start understanding that at a certain age girls were prohibited to attend school, he inspired her to stand up and speak up. Instead of attending school, girls would have to stay home and learn how to cook for their brothers and fathers. When he created his low-cost private school business after college with his friend Naeem Khan, they were open to teaching girls who would strive to keep learning and going to school. He supported every woman who wanted to become successful in life and not stay illiterate like many women in Pakistan.

=== Other activities ===
Ziauddin did a sit down interview with the current affairs program The Agenda. He also gave a speech for TED Talk where he describes the reasons he encourages his daughter to speak up for women's rights. In his speech, he recalls never seeing his sisters' names written on paper growing up, and going to school while they all had to stay home. He attributes his activism to these facts.

== Awards ==
On 11 June 2015, Yousafzai received an honorary doctorate of law from Wilfrid Laurier University in Waterloo, Canada for his commitment to peace, as well as his ongoing efforts for the educational rights of girls in Pakistan and beyond.

In 2017, Yousafzai was awarded, along with his daughter, an honorary doctorate from the University of Ottawa in Canada.

== Bibliography ==
Yousafzai wrote an autobiography titled Let Her Fly which was published in November 2018. In his book he describes his fight for the rights of all children to have an equal education, and speaks about opportunities and social and political recognition.

The Bollywood actor Atul Kulkarni played Malala Yousafzai's father in the film Gul Makai.

== Personal life ==
Yousafzai has a wife, named Toor Pekai who is an ethnic Pashtun, a daughter, Malala, and two sons, Khushal and Atal. His first child, born before Malala, was stillborn. Ziauddin has been seen on interviews with his daughter, speaking fluent English and Urdu. He also can speak Pashto.

== See also ==
- Insurgency in Khyber Pakhtunkhwa
