= Kalam (union council) =

- Union Council
- قلعہ کلے
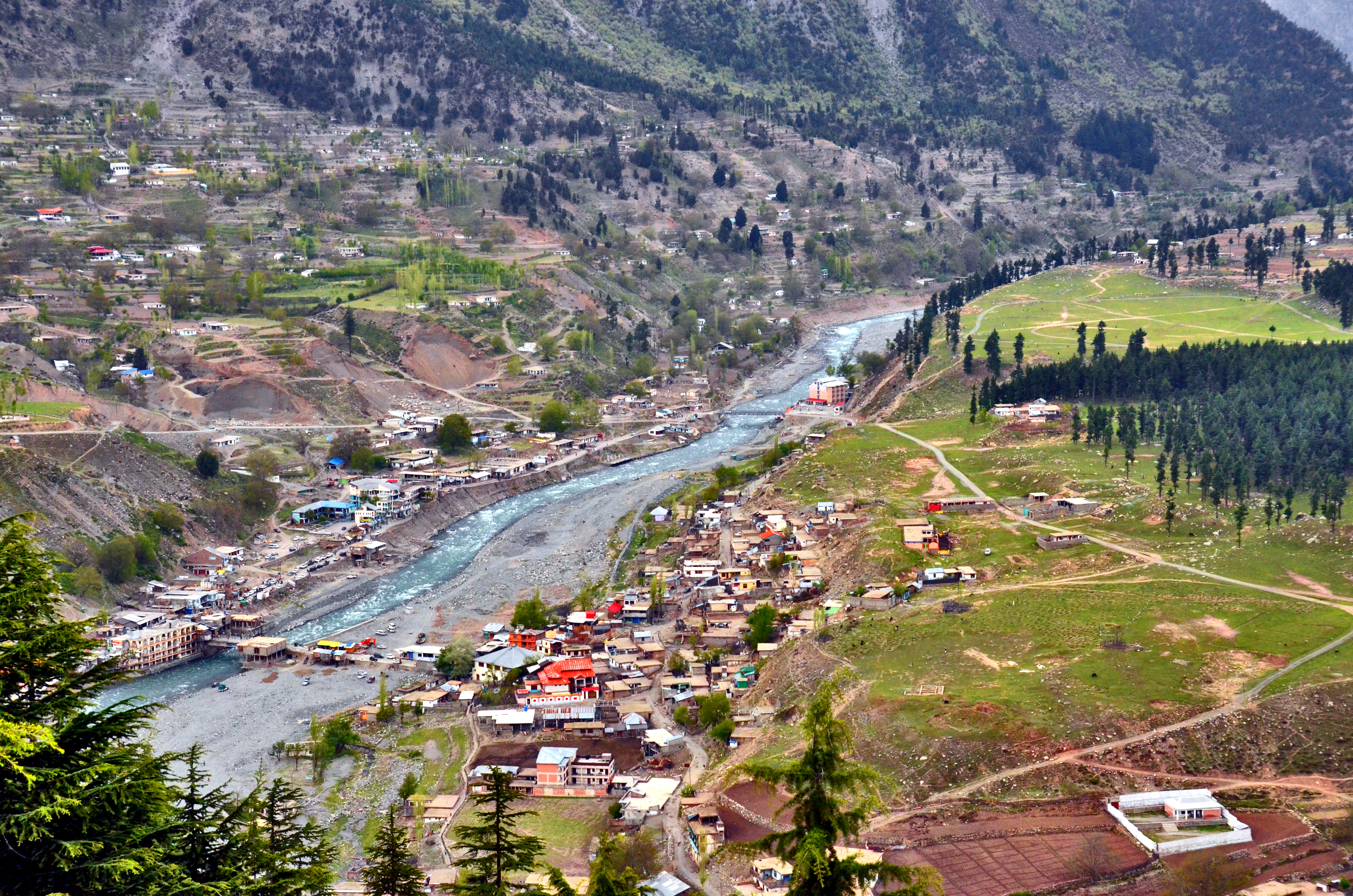
- Interactive map of Kalam
- Country: Pakistan
- Province: Khyber Pakhtunkhwa
- District: Swat
- Tehsil: Behrain

Population (2017)
  - Total: 84,434
- Time zone: UTC+5 (PST)

Kalam (Urdu: قلعہ کلے) is an administrative unit, known as Union council, of Upper Swat District in the Khyber Pakhtunkhwa province of Pakistan. District Swat has 7 Tehsils i.e. Khwazakhela, Kabal, Bahrain, Barikot, Babuzai, Charbagh, and Matta. Each Tehsill comprises certain numbers of union councils. There are 65 union councils in district Swat, 56 rural and 09 urban.

== See also ==
- Swat District
