= Kalkot Tehsil =

Kalkot Tehsil تحصیل کالکوٹ
- Tehsil
- Country: Pakistan
- Province: Khyber Pakhtunkhwa
- District: Upper Dir

Government
  - Chairman: Zia Ur Rahman (JI)
- Time zone: UTC+5 (PST)

Kalkot (Gawri and Urdu: کالکوٹ) is a Tehsil of Upper Dir District in the Khyber Pakhtunkhwa province of Pakistan. The main town, also known as Kalkot, is mainly inhabited by the Gawri and Kalkoti-speakers.

Upper Dir is administratively subdivided into six tehsils which contain a total of 28 Union Councils. Upper Dir is represented in the National Assembly and Provincial Assembly by one elected MNA and three elected MPAs respectively.

== See also ==
- Barikot, Upper Dir
- Rajkot
