= Jamia Masjid Thal =

Mosque in Khyber Pakhtunkhwa, Pakistan

Jama Masjid Thal
- جامع مسجد تھل

Religion
- Affiliation: Sunni Islam

Location
- Location: Upper Dir District, Khyber Pakhtunkhwa
- Country: Pakistan
- Interactive map of Jama Masjid Thal
- Coordinates: 35.47843576460779°N 72.24540430669586°E

Architecture
- Established: 1865; 1953 (renovated)
- Destroyed: 1950
- Materials: Wood, stone

The Jamia Masjid of Thal is a mosque located in Upper Dir District of the Khyber Pakhtunkhwa province in Pakistan. It has a central position in Kumrat Valley, and is situated on the banks of the Panjkora River.

The specialty of this mosque is that it is made of pure wood; and the pillars and beams in the mosque are very large, which are almost impossible to install without machinery.

This mosque was originally built in 1865. In 1950, there was a fire in this mosque, which partially damaged the mosque. Then the local people repaired and rebuilt it with wood. In 1998, the work on the second floor of the mosque started, and the construction of the mosque was completed in about nine years.
