= Torwali people =

Pakistani ethnic group

Total population
- 140,000 (2021)

Regions with significant populations
- Swat Kohistan, Pakistan

Languages
- Torwali

Religion
- Sunni Islam

Related ethnic groups
- Gawris and other Indo-Aryan peoples

The Torwali people are an Indo-Aryan ethnolinguistic group native to the Swat Kohistan region (also known as Torwal) of Pakistan. They speak an Indo-Aryan language called Torwali, and are closely related to the neighbouring Gawri people of Kalam and Kumrat. The Torwali people have a culture that values the telling of folktales and music that is played using the sitar.

== Geographic distribution ==
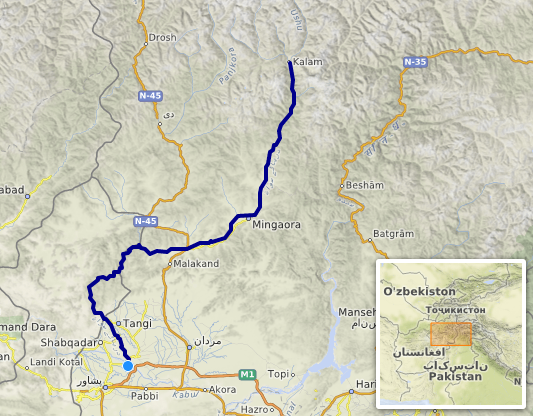
The Swat Valley

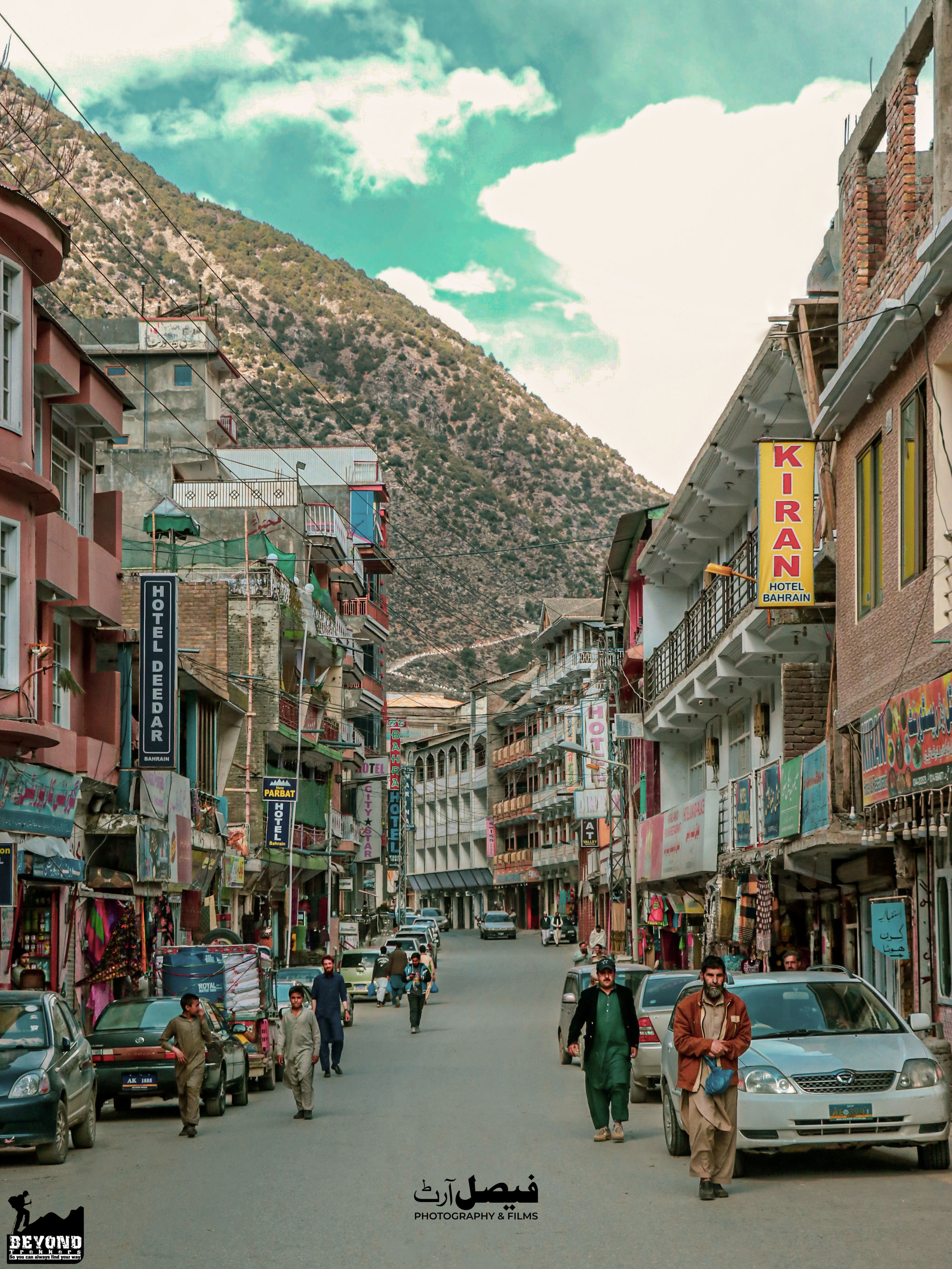
A market street in Bahrain

The Torwalis inhabit the Swat Valley between Laikot (a little south of Kalam) down to and including the village of Bahrain (60 km north of Mingora). They also inhabit the Chail Valley, a tributary of the main Swat Valley. The two valleys join at Madyan, 8 km below Bahrain.

The Torwalis live in compact villages of up to 600 houses, mainly on the west bank of the Swat River. Fredrik Barth estimated that they constituted about 2000 households in all in 1956. All the Torwalis he met were bilingual, speaking Pashto and Torwali.

== History ==
A Torwali song on Eid

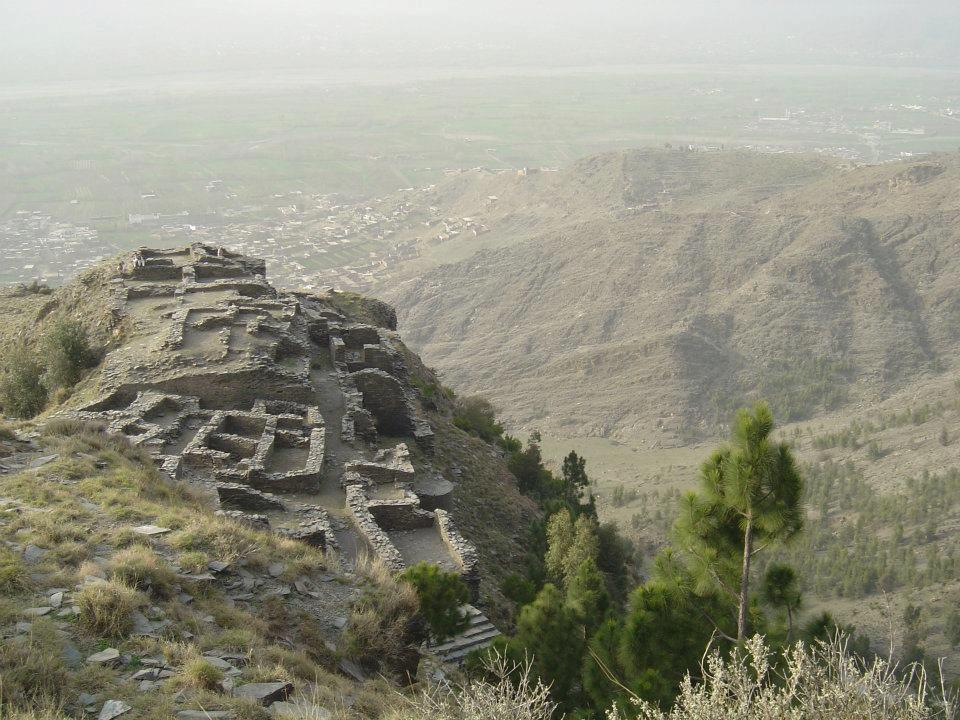
Ruins of the fort of Raja Gira, traditionally believed to be the last Hindu ruler of Swat.

The Torwali people are believed to be among the earliest natives to the region of Swat. The Torwali language is the closest modern Indo-Aryan language still spoken today to Niya, a dialect of Gandhārī, a Middle Indo-Aryan language spoken in the ancient region of Gandhara. The Torwalis were native to a more extensive area, such as towards Buner, from where they were expelled into mountainous tracts by successive aggressive migration by Pashtuns. They are referred to by Pashtuns as "Kohistanis", which was the name given by them to "All other Muhammadans of Indian descent in the Hindu Kush valleys".

In the 11th century, according to the local traditions, the Hindu Shahi king Raja Gira and his subjects were attacked by Mahmud of Ghazni during one of his campaigns. By the 17th century, in the aftermath of Yusufzai Pashtun invasions in the region, most of the Torwalis had converted from Hinduism and Buddhism to Islam; however, elements of traditional culture were still heavily practised.

== Language ==
The Torwali people speak the Torwali language, an Indo-Aryan language of the Dardic (Kohistani) subgroup; the language was first documented by colonial archaeologist Aurel Stein in around 1925, and the records were published by George Abraham Grierson as 'Torwali: An Account of a Dardic Language of the Swat Kohistan' in 1929.

It had approximately 102,000 speakers in 2016 and by 2017, eight schools with instruction in the Torwali language had been established for Torwali students. Before 2007, the language did not have a written tradition.

== Culture ==
Unique to the Torwali people are traditional games, which were abandoned for more than six decades. A festival held in Bahrain known as Simam attempted to revive them in 2011. The Torwali people have a tradition of telling folktales.

=== Music ===
The Torwali people play music using the traditional South Asian instrument known as the sitar. Modern Torwali songs influenced by Urdu or Pashto music are known as phal.

Javed Iqbal Torwali plays the traditional Talalai tune
