= Thal, Upper Dir District =

Settlement in Kumrat Valley, Pakistan

Coordinates: 35.478°N 72.244°E

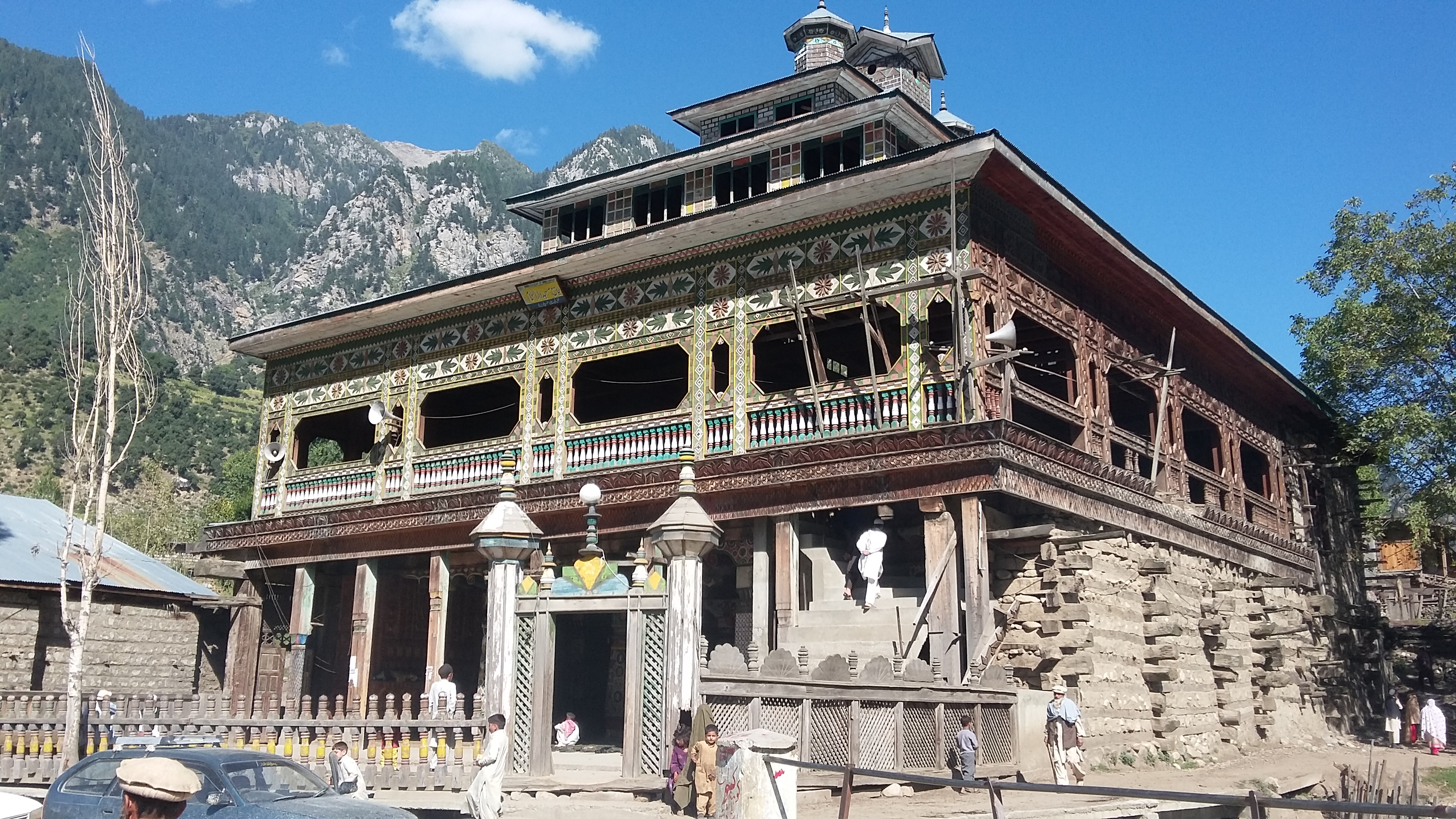
The 200-years old Jamia Masjid of Thal, Kumrat, was constructed mainly of Deodar wood.

Thal, also spelt Thall, is a town located in the Kumrat Valley of Upper Dir District in Khyber Pakhtunkhwa, Pakistan. It is the last settlement in Kumrat, located 22 km northeast of Rajkot. Thal is predominantly Gawri-speaking.
