= Balakot, Swat =

Balakot
- Union Council
- بالاکوٹ
- Country: Pakistan
- Province: Khyber Pakhtunkhwa
- District: Upper Swat

Population (2017)
  - Total: 3,772
- Time zone: UTC+5 (PST)

Balakot (Urdu: بالاکوٹ) is an administrative unit, known as Union council, of Upper Swat District in the Khyber Pakhtunkhwa province of Pakistan.
