= Bahrain, Pakistan =

Bahrain
- Town
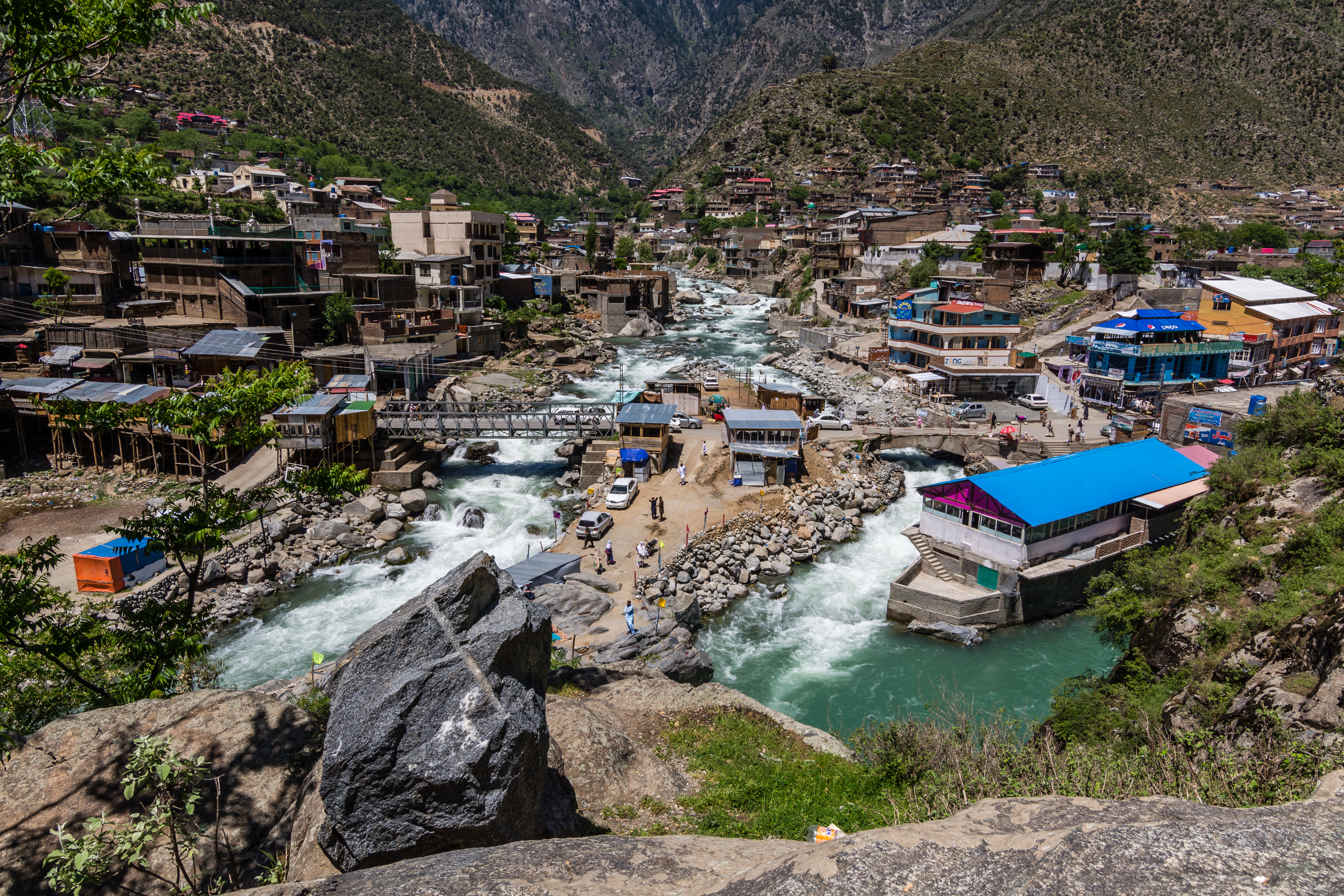

- Location within Khyber Pakhtunkhwa Location within Pakistan
- Coordinates: 35.2075°N 72.5456°E
- Country: Pakistan
- Province: Khyber Pakhtunkhwa
- District: Upper Swat
- Tehsil: Bahrain

Government
  - Tehsil Chairman: Shahid Ali (PTI)
- Elevation: 1,435 m (4,708 ft)

Population (2023)
  - Total: 76,728
- Time zone: UTC+5 (PST)

Bahrain (Torwali: بحرین; also spelled Behrain), formerly known in Torwali as Bhaunal, is a town located in Upper Swat District of Khyber Pakhtunkhwa, Pakistan, 60 km north of Mingora at an elevation of 1432 metres on the right bank of the Swat river. Geographically in the Swat Kohistan region, it is named Bahrain (lit. "two rivers") due to its location at the confluence of the Daral and Swat rivers. It is known for its riverside tourist resorts, local handicrafts, and its view of the merging of the Daral and Swat rivers. It also serves as a base camp for the trail that leads to the Daral and Saidgai lakes. Behrain is the tehsil headquarter of Behrain Tehsil.

== Demographics ==
=== Population ===
Historical population
Year	Pop.	±% p.a.
1951	...	—
1961	...	—
1972	...	—
1981	...	—
1998	...	—
2017	61,787	—
2023	76,728	+3.68%

As of the 2023 census, Bahrain had a population of 76,728.

== Climate ==
With a mild and generally warm and temperate climate, Bahrain has a humid subtropical climate (Cfa) under the Köppen climate classification. The average temperature in Bahrain is 16.6 °C or 61.9 °F, while the annual precipitation averages 866 millimetres or 34.09 inches. November is the driest month with 21 millimetres or 0.83 inches of precipitation, while March, the wettest month, has an average precipitation of 120 millimetres or 4.72 inches.

July is the hottest month of the year with an average temperature of 27.0 °C or 80.6 °F. The coldest month, January, has an average temperature of 4.8 °C or 40.6 °F.

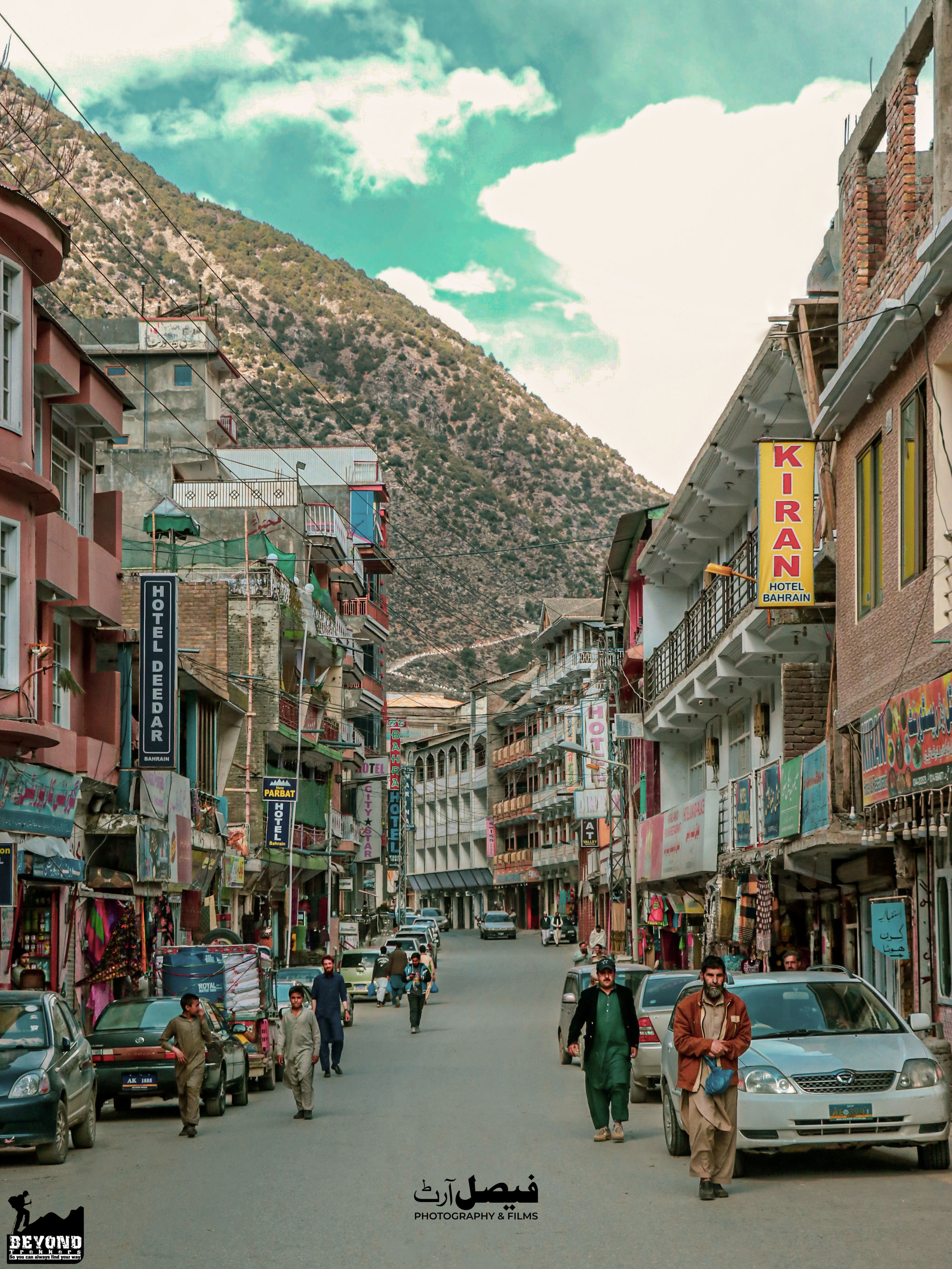
A market street in Bahrain

Climate data for Bahrain
Month	Jan	Feb	Mar	Apr	May	Jun	Jul	Aug	Sep	Oct	Nov	Dec	Year
Mean daily maximum °C (°F)	9.1 (48.4)	11.1 (52.0)	16.3 (61.3)	21.8 (71.2)	27.2 (81.0)	33.3 (91.9)	33.5 (92.3)	32.2 (90.0)	29.6 (85.3)	24.7 (76.5)	18.7 (65.7)	11.7 (53.1)	22.4 (72.4)
Daily mean °C (°F)	4.8 (40.6)	6.5 (43.7)	11.1 (52.0)	16.1 (61.0)	20.8 (69.4)	26.2 (79.2)	27.0 (80.6)	26.0 (78.8)	23.1 (73.6)	17.9 (64.2)	12.5 (54.5)	7.0 (44.6)	16.6 (61.9)
Mean daily minimum °C (°F)	0.6 (33.1)	2.0 (35.6)	5.9 (42.6)	10.4 (50.7)	14.5 (58.1)	19.2 (66.6)	20.5 (68.9)	19.9 (67.8)	16.6 (61.9)	11.2 (52.2)	6.4 (43.5)	2.4 (36.3)	10.8 (51.4)
Average rainfall mm (inches)	69 (2.7)	92 (3.6)	120 (4.7)	107 (4.2)	64 (2.5)	40 (1.6)	109 (4.3)	109 (4.3)	61 (2.4)	33 (1.3)	21 (0.8)	41 (1.6)	866 (34)
Source: Climate-Data.org

== See also ==
- Marghazar
- Miandam
- Malam Jabba
- Madyan
- Kalam
- Gabina Jabba
- Bashigram Lake
