= Patrak =

Coordinates: 35°21′N 72°04′E

- Union Council
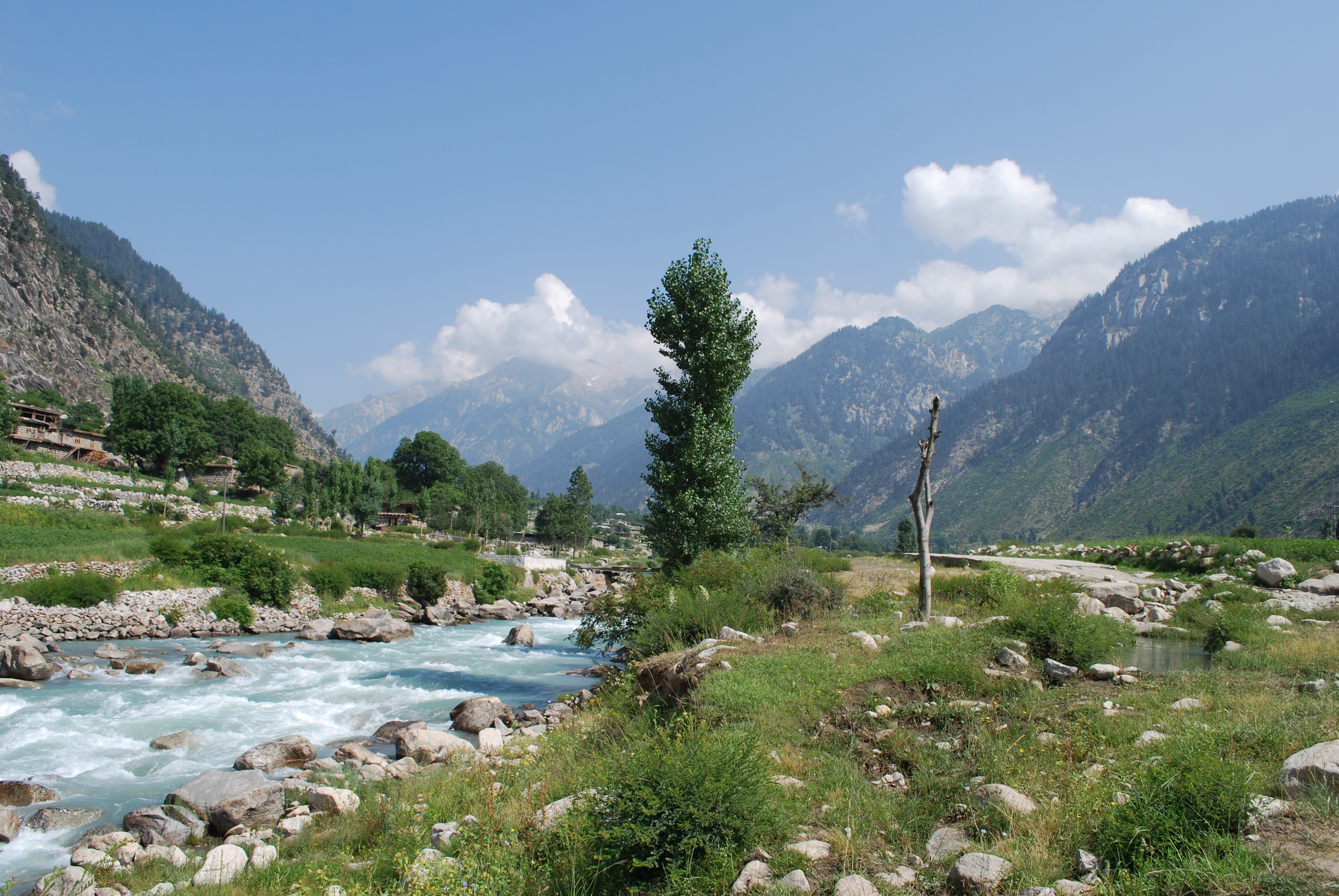
- Interactive map of Patrak
- Country: Pakistan
- Province: Khyber Pakhtunkhwa
- District: Upper Dir
- Time zone: UTC+5 (PST)

Patrak, also known as Rajkot, is a town and Union Council of Upper Dir District in the Khyber Pakhtunkhwa province of Pakistan. Patrak is located in the middle of two rivers (Guwaldi and Kumrat). It is mainly inhabited by Gawri people.

Upper Dir is administratively subdivided into six tehsils which contain a total of 28 Union Councils. Upper Dir is represented in the National Assembly and Provincial Assembly by one elected MNA and three elected MPAs respectively.

== See also ==
- Kalkot
- Barikot, Upper Dir
