= Ethnolinguistic group =

Ethnic group also unified by a common language

An ethnolinguistic group (or ethno-linguistic group) is a group that is unified by both a common ethnicity and language. Most ethnic groups share a first language. However, "ethnolinguistic" is often used to emphasise that language is a major basis for the ethnic group, especially in regard to its neighbours.

A central concept in the linguistic study of ethnolinguistic groups is ethnolinguistic vitality, the ability of the group's language and ethnicity to sustain themselves. An ethnolinguistic group that lacks such vitality is unlikely to survive as a distinct entity. Factors that influence the ethnolinguistic vitality are demographics, institutional control and status (including language planning factors).

== See also ==
- First language
- Ethnolinguistics
- Ethnoreligious group
- Nation state
- Race (human classification)
- Regionalism (politics)
