= Beshigram =

Beshigra
- Union Council
- Country: Pakistan
- Province: Khyber Pakhtunkhwa
- District: Upper Swat

Population (2017)
  - Total: 8,033
- Time zone: UTC+5 (PST)

Beshigram is an administrative unit, known as Union council, of Upper Swat District in the Khyber Pakhtunkhwa province of Pakistan.
