= Madyan, Pakistan =

Madyan
- Union Council
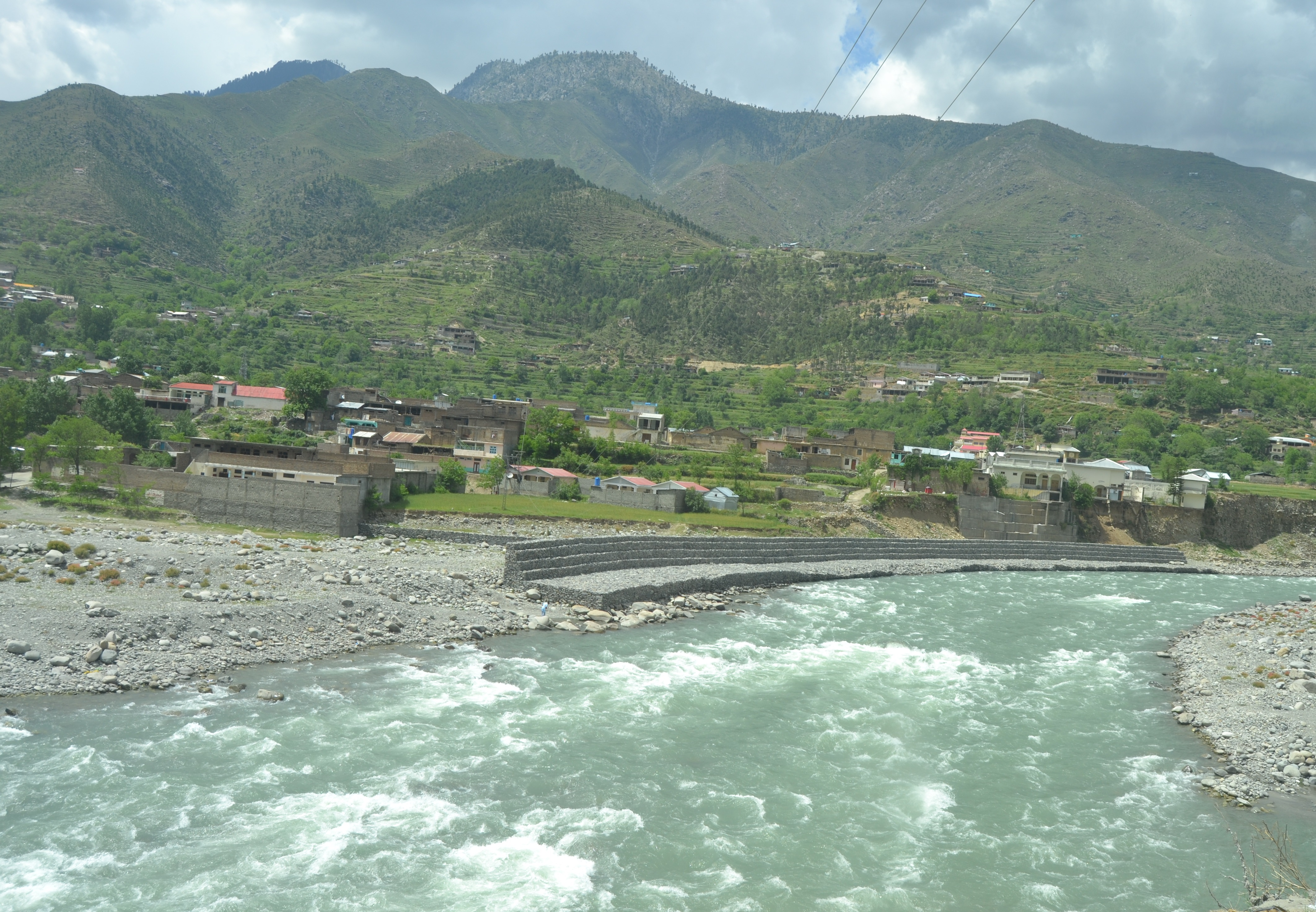
- Swat River flowing through Madyan
- Interactive map of Madyan
- Coordinates: 35°08′N 72°32′E
- Country: Pakistan
- Province: Khyber Pakhtunkhwa
- District: Upper Swat
- Tehsil: Behrain
- Elevation: 1,320 m (4,330 ft)
- Time zone: UTC+5 (PST)

Madyan (Urdu: مدین) is a popular hill station located in the Upper Swat District in northern Pakistan. It is situated at a distance of about 55 kilometres (34 mi) from Mingora. Madyan is primarily inhabited by Torwalis. In the recent years Madyan has emerged as a popular tourist destination in the Swat valley, attracting thousands of tourists from all over Pakistan.

== Notable people ==
- Laiq Zada Laiq
