= List of populated places in Khyber Pakhtunkhwa =

The following is a list of populated places in the Khyber Pakhtunkhwa province of Pakistan:

Name	Type	District
== A ==
Abbottabad	City	Abbottabad
Abdul Khel	Town	Lakki Marwat
Adezai	Village	Peshawar
Ahad Koruna	Town	Peshawar
Ahmadwam	Town	Dera Ismail Khan
Ahmed Khel	Town	Lakki Marwat
Akhun Kalai	Village	Swat
Akora Khattak	Town	Nowshera
Aliabad	Village	Abbottabad
Aloch	Town	Shangla
Alpuri	Capital	Shangla
Amandi	Town	Bannu
Amirabad	Village	Abbottabad
Aral Hathi Khel	Town	Bannu
Arandu, Pakistan	Town	Chitral
Asperka Waziran	Town	Bannu
== B ==
Benowrai	Village	Swat
Beer	Village	Haripur
Battal	Village	Mansehra
Balambat	Tehsil	Lower Dir
Bagh Maidan	Village	Lower Dir
Baist Khel	Town	Lakki Marwat
Bakhshali	Village	Mardan
Balakot	Town	Mansehra
Bandi Dhundan	Village	Abbottabad
Bannu	City	Bannu
Banseri	Village	Abbottabad
Bara Bandai	Village	Swat
Bara Gali	Town	Abbottabad
Barat	Village	Bannu
Barikot	City	Swat
Basian	Town	Abbottabad
Batakara	Town	Swabi
Batamori	Town	Battagram
Batangi	Village	Abbottabad
Batkhela	Capital City	Malakand
Batnara	Village	Abbottabad
Battagram	Capital City	Battagram
Bengalai	Town	Shangla
Bhanda Peeraan	Village	Mansehra
Bilkanai	Village	Shangla
== C ==
Chagam	Town	Shangla
Chaghar Matti	Village	Peshawar
Chakdara	Town	Lower Dir
Chamba	Village	Abbottabad
Chamba, Mansehra	Village	Mansehra
Chamnaka	Village	Abbottabad
Chapri	Town	Nowshera
Charbagh	Village	Swat
Charguli	Town	Mardan
Charsadda	Town	Charsadda
Chathi	Village	Haripur
Cheh Kan	Town	Dera Ismail Khan
Chehr Gali	Village	Mansehra
Cherat	Town	Nowshera
Chitral	Capital	Chitral
Chiita batta-Sande e Sar	Village	Mansehra
Chiiti Gatti-Gandhian	Village	Mansehra
Chowkara	Town	Karak
Choudhwan	Town	Dera Ismail Khan
== D ==
Darband	Capital	Manshera
Dak Ismail Khel	Village	Nowshera
Damghar	Village	Swat
Dandoqa	Village	Swabi
Darband	Town	Mansehra
Dargai	Town	Malakand
Darsamand	Town	Hangu
Daruni Maira	Village	Abbottabad
Darwesh	Village	Haripur
Datta	Village	Mansehra
Daulat Khel	Village	Lakki Marwat
Dera Ismail Khan	City	Dera Ismail Khan
Devi	Village	Mansehra
Dhakki	Village	Charsadda
Dhap Shumali	Town	Dera Ismail Khan
Dir	Town	Upper Dir
Domun	Village	Lower Chitral
Drosh	Town	Chitral
== E ==
Eastern Jehangira	Village	Swabi
== G ==
Gallai, Pakistan	Village	Haripur
Gandaf	Capital	Swabi
Gandiali Bala	Town	Kohat
Garhi Ismail Zai	Town	Mardan
Garlat	Village	Mansehra
Garu	Village	Nowshera
Garyala	Town	Mardan
Ghafe	Village	Mardan
Ghamjaba	Village	Swat
Ghanool	Village	Mansehra
Ghojalai	Village	Swat
Ghoriwala	Town	Bannu
Ghulam Faruque Khan	Village	Peshawar
Ghunda Karkana	Town	Charsadda
Gijbori	Village	Battagram
Giloti	Town	Tank
Gorraki	Village	Haripur
Gujar Garhi	Village	Mardan
Gulzar Kalle	Village	Bannu
Gulzar	Village	Mardan
Gulzari	Village	Lakki Marwat
Gumbat	Town	Kohat
Gurakki	Village	Haripur
Gurguri	Village	Karak
Gup, Pakistan	Village	Abbottabad
== H ==
Hajia Gali	Village	Abbottabad
Hajizai	Town	Charsadda
Hamsherian	Village	Mansehra
Hangrai	Village	Mansehra
Hangu	City	Hangu
Harichand	Town	Charsadda
Haripur	City	Haripur
Hassan Zai	Town	Charsadda
Hathala	Town	Dera Ismail Khan
Hathian	Village	Mardan
Hathi Mera	Village	Mansehra
Havelian	Town	Abbottabad
Hilkot	Village	Mansehra
Hindki	Village	Bannu
Hinjal	Town	Bannu
Hisara Nehri	Town	Charsadda
Hissara Yasinzai	Town	Charsadda
== I ==
Ingarodherai	Village	Swat
Insanabad	Village	Mardan
== J ==
Jabar Kili	Village	Bannu
Jabar Koruna	Village	Malakand
Jabrian	Village	Mansehra
Jalala	Village	Mardan
Jalalia	Town	Abbottabad
Jalbai	Village	Swabi
Jandala	Village	Abbottabad
Jandri	Village	Karak
Jango	Village	Lower Dir
Jani Khel	Town	Bannu
Jared	Village	Mansehra
Jaswal Pani	Village	Abbottabad
Jatta Ismail Khel	Village	Karak
Jattipind	Village	Haripur
Jehangira Road	Town	Nowshera
Jehangira	Town	Swabi
Jhanda	Town	Swabi
== K ==
Kach Banda	Town	Hangu
Kachi	Village	Haripur
Kahi	Village	Hangu
Kala Pani, Pakistan	Village	Abbottabad
Kalabat	Town	Swabi
Kalu Maira	Village	Abbottabad
Kandar	Village	Abbottabad
Kanju	Village	Swat
Karak	Town	Karak
Karnol	Village	Mansehra
Karorri	Village	Mansehra
Kawajamad	Town	Bannu
Keck	Town	Dera Ismail Khan
Kewal	Village	Mansehra
Khadizai	Village	Kohat
Khaira Gali	Town	Abbottabad
Khan Mahi	Town	Charsadda
Khandar Khan Khel	Town	Bannu
Kharu Khel Pacca	Town	Lakki Marwat
Khawari	Village	Mansehra
Khemdarra	Village	Swat
Khojari	Town	Bannu
Khwazakhela	Town	Swat
Kiri Shamozai	Town	Dera Ismail Khan
Kityari	Town	Dir Lower
Kohat	Capital City	Kohat
Kot Jai	Town	Dera Ismail Khan
Kotka Piran	Village	Bannu
Kotli Kalan	Village	Nowshera
Kotli Khurd, Nowshera	Village	Nowshera
Koz Behram Dheri	Town	Charsadda
Kukmang	Village	Abbottabad
Kulachi	City	Dera Ismail Khan
Kupri Amazai	Village	Abbottabad
Kalinjar	Village	Haripur
Kurai	Town	Dera Ismail Khan
Kushalgarh, Pakistan	Village	Kohat
== L ==
Labarkot	Village	Mansehra
Lajigarh	Village	Swabi
Laki Ghundaki	Village	Karak
Lakki Marwat	Town	Lakki Marwat
Lal Qila	Town	Lower Dir
Lalo Bandai	Village	Swat
Landiwa	Town	Lakki Marwat
Lar	Town	Dera Ismail Khan
Latamber	Town	Karak
Lodi Khel	Town	Hangu
Loe Banr	Village	Swat
Lond	Town	Mansehra
Looni	Town	Dera Ismail Khan
== M ==
Maddi	Town	Dera Ismail Khan
Madyan	Town	Swat
Mahandri	Village	Mansehra
Mahra	Town	Dera Ismail Khan
Maira Amjad Ali	Village	Mansehra
Maira Umderzai	Town	Charsadda
Majhot	Village	Abbottabad
Majuhan	Village	Abbottabad
Makool Tarli	Village	Abbottabad
Malik Pur	Village	Mansehra
Malkot	Village	Abbottabad
Malla	Village	Abbottabad
Mama Khel Banoochi	Town	Bannu
Mama Khel	Town	Lakki Marwat
Mandan	Town	Bannu
Mansehra	Town	Mansehra
Marandeh Valley	Town	Chitral
Mardan	City	Mardan
Mari	Village	Abbottabad
Martung	Village	Shangla
Masha Mansoor	Town	Lakki Marwat
Mastuj	Town	Chitral
Matehal	Village	Mansehra
Math	Village	Lower Dir
Mathra	Village	Peshawar
Mehr Ali	Village	Swabi
Mian Kalay Shangla	Town	Shangla
Mian Khan	Village	Mardan
Mianki Banda	Town	Karak
Mingora	City	Swat
Mira Khel	Town	Bannu
Miran	Town	Dera Ismail Khan
Mirzadher	Town	Charsadda
Mita Khel	Town	Bannu
Mitha Khel	Village	Karak
Mohandri	Village	Mansehra
Muhammad Khawja	Town	Hangu
Muhammad Khel	Town	Bannu
Muhammad Nari	Town	Charsadda
Mukhdabbi	Village	Abbottabad
Muqeem Shah	Town	Dera Ismail Khan
Muryali	Town	Dera Ismail Khan
Muslimabad Kohat	Village	Kohat
== N ==
Nala	Village	Abbottabad
Nar Abu Samand Begu Khel	Town	Lakki Marwat
Nar Jaffar Khan	Town	Bannu
Naran	Town	Mansehra
Nari Panoos	Village	Karak
Nathia Gali	Town	Abbottabad
Nawan kalli	Village	Mardan
Nawe Kele	Village	Swat
Nisatta	Town	Charsadda
Nimkalay	Town	Shangla
Ningulai	Village	Swat
Nizampur	Town	Nowshera
Noor Jalal Ghari	Village	Swabi
Nowshera	City	Nowshera
Nurar	Town	Bannu
== O ==
—	—	—
== P ==
Pabbi	Village	Nowshera
Paharpur,	Town	Dera Ismail Khan
Pandak	Village	Haripur
Panjpao	Town	Charsadda
Panjpir	Town	Swabi
Pashto	Town	Battagram
Pattan	Capital	Lower Kohistan
Peeran	Village	Mansehra
Perhinna	Village	Mansehra
Peshawar	City (Provincial Capital)	Peshawar
Pir Piai	Village	Nowshera
== Q ==
Qaāgai	Village	Battagram
Qalandarabad	Village	Abbottabad
== R ==
Rajjar	Town	Charsadda
Rashang	Town	Battagram
Rehana	Village	Haripur
Risalpur	Town	Nowshera
Ronyal	Village	Swat
Rustam	Town	Mardan
== S ==
Sacha Kalan	Village	Mansehra
Saeedabad	Village	Peshawar
Saidu Sharif	City	Swat
Sajkot	Village	Abbottabad
Saleem Khan	Town	Swabi
Saleh Khana	Village	Nowshera
Sandasar	Village	Mansehra
Sangara	Village	Abbottabad
Sangota	Village	Swat
Sardheri	Village	Charsadda
Saro Shah	Town	Mardan
Sarozai	Village	Hangu
Satbani	Village	Mansehra
Shagey	Village	Mansehra
Shah Hassan Khel	Village	Lakki Marwat
Shahbaz Azmat Khel	Town	Bannu
Shahtut	Town	Shangla
Shalpin	Village	Swat
Shamdarra	Village	Mansehra
Shamshi Khel	Town	Bannu
Sheikh-ul-bandi	Village	Abbottabad
Sherwan	Village	Abbottabad
Shewa Adda	City	Swabi
Shingli Bala	Town	Battagram
Shohal Mazullah	Village	Mansehra
Shore Kot	Town	Dera Ismail Khan
Sial	Village	Abbottabad
Sikandar Khel Bala	Town	Bannu
Siraj Khel	Village	Karak
Sirsanai	Village	Swat
Soha	Village	Haripur
Spin Khak	Town	Nowshera
Sundavi	Town	Shangla
Surdag	Village	Karak
Surizai Bala	Village	Peshawar
Swabi	Town	Swabi
Swatiabad	Village	Mansehra
== T ==
Tajwal Utli	Village	Abbottabad
Tajwal Tarli	Village	Abbottabad
Takhti Khel Wazir	Town	Bannu
Talhata	Village	Mansehra
Talokar	Village	Haripur
Tank	City	Tank
Tarnab	Town	Charsadda
Teer	Village	Haripur
Teri	Village	Karak
Thall	Town	Hangu
Thall	Town	Upper Dir
Thandiani	Resort/Hamlet	Abbottabad
Thandkoi	Town	Swabi
Tikri	Town	Battagram
Timergara	City	Lower Dir
Titar Khel Guli Jan	Town	Lakki Marwat
Titer Khel	Village	
Toordand	Village	Karak
Topi	Town	Swabi
Tordher	Town	Swabi
Toru	Village	Mardan
Totalai	Village	Buner
Tupla	Village	Abbottabad
Turlandi	Village	Swabi
== U ==
Umderzai	Town	Charsadda
== W ==
Wazira	Village	Abbottabad
Western Jehangira	Town	Nowshera
== Y ==
Yaqubi	Village	Swabi
Yar Hussain	Town	Swabi
Yarik	Town	Dera Ismail Khan
== Z ==
Zira Khel	Village	North Waziristan
Zaim	Town	Charsadda
