= Tangi Tehsil =

Tangi Tehsil تحصیل تنگی تنګي تحصیل
- Tehsil
- Country: Pakistan
- Province: Khyber Pakhtunkhwa
- District: Charsadda
- Headquarters: Tangi

Government
  - Chairman: Fazal Amin (IND (Note: Officially affiliated with the PTI, but filed nomination papers as an independent due to the PTI intra-party elections case))

Population (2017)
  - Tehsil: 428,239
  - Urban: 33,012
  - Rural: 395,227
- Time zone: UTC+5 (PST)

Tangi Tehsil is a tehsil located in Charsadda District, Khyber Pakhtunkhwa, Pakistan.

== History ==
During British rule, Tangi was part of Charsadda Tehsil (then part of Peshawar District).

In March 2018, Tangi resident Dr. Nadeem Jan from Tangi Nasratzai Mohalla Fateh Kheil was awarded the Tamgha-e-Imtiaz by the president of Pakistan.

Dr Nadeem Jan later on took oath as Federal Health Minister during the interim Federal cabinet of Pakistan.

Graves of religious scholars and famous personalities include Sharo Mian Sahib, Nika Sahib, and Muhammadzai Nika Mazar.

The tehsil is subdivided into 12 Union Councils, including the headquarters - Tangi.

- Tangi MC
- Hisara Nehri
- Sherpao
- Ziam
- Abazai
- Mirzadher
- Koz Behraam Dheri
- Ghan Dheri
- Mandani
- Dakki
- Shodag
- Harichand

== Population ==
The 2017 population of Tangi Tehsil was 428,239.

Population changes
| Consensus Year | Population | Rural Population | Urban Population |
|---|---|---|---|
| 1951 | 66,115 | 54,050 | 12,065 |
| 1961 | 83,579 | 68,873 | 14,706 |
| 1972 | 117,192 | 99,170 | 18,022 |
| 1981 | 149, 692 | 130,200 | 19,492 |
| 1998 | 254,461 | 229,115 | 25,346 |
| 2017 | 428,239 | N/A | N/A |

== See also ==
- Charsadda District
- Charsadda Tehsil
- Shabqadar Tehsil
