= Shabqadar Tehsil =

Tehsil Shabqadar تحصیل شبقدر تحصیل شبقدر
- Tehsil
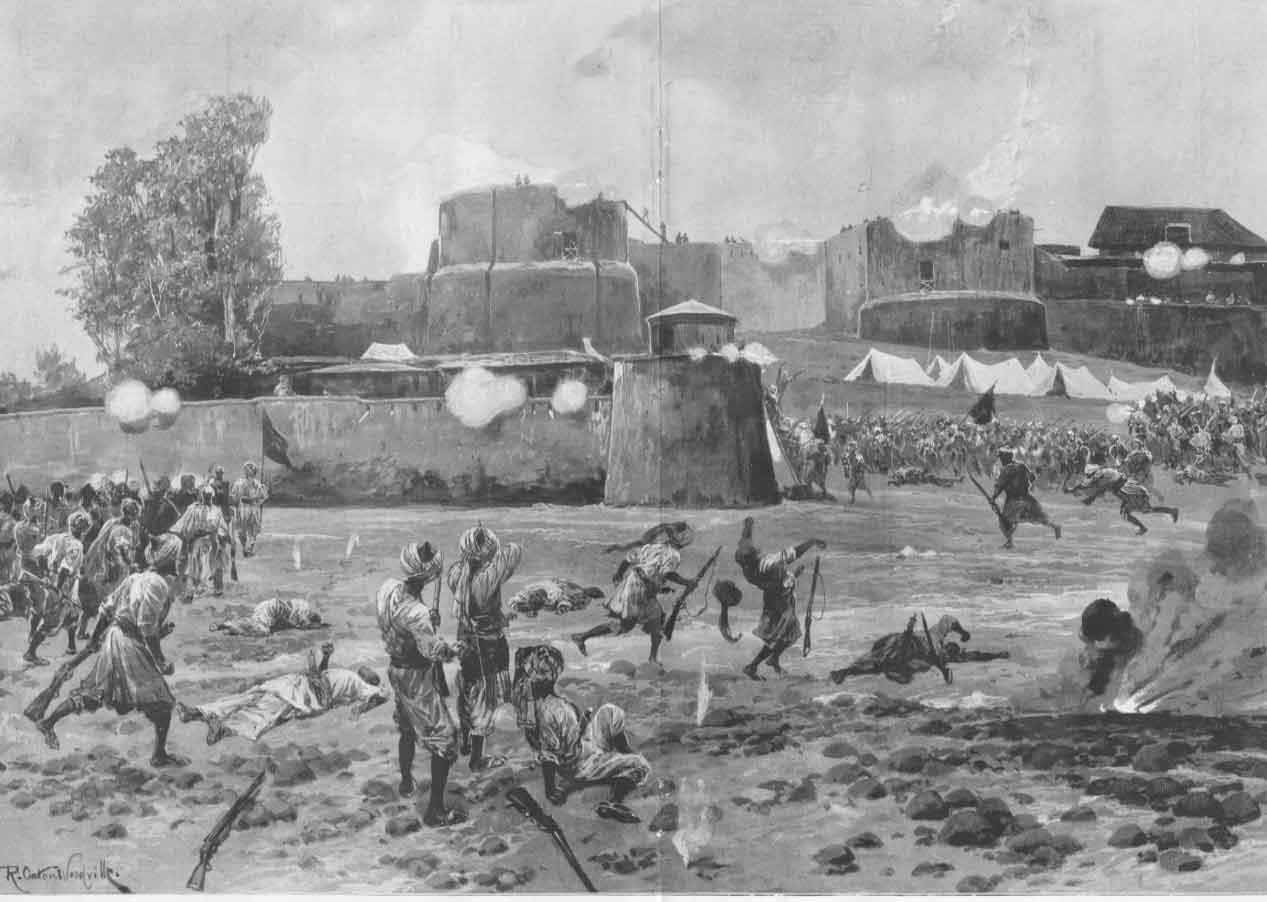
- Pashtun tribesmen attack the British-held fort during the 1897 Frontier Revolt

- Flag Seal

- Location within Pakistan Tehsil Shabqadar (Pakistan) Tehsil Shabqadar (Asia) Tehsil Shabqadar (Earth)
- Coordinates: 34°12′19.584″N 71°34′59.9448″E
- Country: Pakistan
- Province: Khyber Pakhtunkhwa
- District: Charsadda
- Capital: Shabqadar
- Founded: ----
- Union Councils: 12

Government
  - Type: Municipal Corporation
  - Tehsil Chairman: Hamza Asif Khan (JUI)

Area
  - Tehsil: 204 km^{2} (79 sq mi)

Population (2023)
  - Tehsil: 440,524
  - Rank: 2nd, Tehsil in District Charsadda
  - Density: 2,160/km^{2} (5,590/sq mi)
  - Urban: 102,340 (23.23%)
  - Rural: 338,184 (76.77%)
- Time zone: UTC+5 (PKT)
- Postal Code: 24630
- Area code: 091
- Languages: Pashto, Urdu
- HDI (2017): ▲ ###' (high)
- Website: [http:// City Government of Shabqadar]

Shabqadar Tehsil is a tehsil in Charsadda District, Khyber Pakhtunkhwa, Pakistan. The tehsil is named after Shabqadar town, which is the tehsil headquarter.

== Demographics ==
The population of Shabqadar Tehsil, according to the 2017 census, is 383,765 while according to the 1998 census, it was 240,751.

Historical population
Year	Pop.	±% p.a.
1951	...	—
1961	...	—
1972	...	—
1981	...	—
1998	240,751	—
2017	383,765	+2.48%
2023	440,524	+2.33%

== Administration ==
Shabqadar became a tehsil in 1988. The tehsil is administratively subdivided into 12 Union Councils of which the headquarter is Shabqadar town. Under new local government rules, Shabqadar tehsil is divided into 29 village councils (VC) and 6 neighbourhood councils (NC).

=== Tehsil union councils ===
Shabqadar tehsil union councils are listed below:

- Shabqadar MC-I
- Shabqadar MC-II
- Shabqadar MC-III
- Panjpao
- Rashakai
- Matta Magul Khel
- Katozai
- Hassanzai
- Haji Zai
- Battagram
- Kangra
- Dolat pura (Daulat Pura)

=== National Assembly Seat ===
The Tehsil is represented in the National Assembly by an MNA who represents the following constituency:

Constituency	MNA	Party
NA-23 (Charsadda-I)	Malik Anwar Taj	PTI

=== Provincial Assembly Seat ===
The Tehsil is represented in the Provincial Assembly by an MPA who represents the following constituency:

Constituency	MPA	Party
PK-60 Charsadda-V	Mohammad Arif	PTI

== See also ==
- Charsadda Tehsil
