= Khubai =

Coordinates: 34°39′N 73°24′E

Khubai is a Pakistani village. It is part of the union council Hasan Zai, tehsil Shabqadar in the Charsadda district of Khyber Pakhtunkhwa. The village is 2 kilometres Northeast on Katozai road of Shabqadar City. The historical Sikh fort of Shabqadar is situated 1 mile away from village Khubai. The population of Khubai is reported to be small.

== People ==
The primary inhabitants of the village are known as Akhunzadagan, Dilazak, Degankhel Mandanrr, Syeid The traditional hujra system operates here. Agriculture is the main source of income of this village. The primary tribe, ‘Akhunzadas' of Khubai were known for their inclination towards receiving education in West and India. Khubai homes tribals excelling in the civil services including the federal Government. They maintained good terms with the British before partition.

== Education ==
The village has two government primary schools and one private high school. The level of education has increased considerably but due to lack of resources and unavailability of colleges, 85% of the students limit their education level to 10th Class. An organization consisting of young people, Tandem Nauojanan E Khubai is working to increase the betterment of the people.
