= Mandani =

Town and union council in Pakistan

Mandani is a town and union council in Charsadda District of Khyber-Pakhtunkhwa. It is located at 34°20'46N 71°47'10E and has an altitude of 376 metres (1236 feet).

== Name Origin ==
The myth surrounding the founding of Mandani tells of a farmer who sowed 50 kg of wheat seeds in Manadi, only to yield 5 kg of grain. This led to the belief that the area was barren, giving rise to the name Mun-Dari. However, contrary to this myth, Mandani is now the most fertile and prosperous union council in the District of Charsadda.

== Early Settlers ==
Initially, a few tribes of Yousafzai and Mohmand arrived and began developing the arid, non-agricultural land. Among the most notable early settlers was a Yousafzai tribesman from the Mandar subsect, who may have named the area Mandani.

A prominent figure in Mandani’s history, Sirbuland Khan, arrived in the area with Saidu Baba of Saidu Sharif, Swat, to preach Islam. Upon the request of local clans, Saidu Baba entrusted socio-religious authority to Sirbuland Khan, who then took residence in Mandani. A religious scholar and saint, Sirbuland Khan significantly contributed to the religious and national awareness of the inhabitants.

Sirbuland Khan had two notable grandsons: Molana Fazal-i-Ahmad and Fazl-i-Ahad, collectively known as the Mavlavi of Mandani. Fazl-i-Ahad played a crucial role in the 1857 Independence Movement, the Khilafat Movement, and the Mazdoor Kisan Movement. During British rule, he was imprisoned for three years.

The Mavlavi of Mandani was highly regarded for his social reforms, educational contributions, and justice-based leadership in the early stages of settlement.

Over time, various tribes from neighbouring tribal agencies settled in Mandani, drawn by its fertile land and strategic location. The population continued to grow, and the town became a bustling centre of commerce and agriculture.

== Geographical and Economic Significance ==
Mandani’s central bazaar is uniquely rectangular, with each side linking the village to key surrounding areas:

- West: Tangi
- South: Charsadda via Umerzai
- East: The ancient Takht Bahi
- North: Harichand

A major route through Mandani provides the shortest connection between Peshawar and northern Khyber Pakhtunkhwa.

The town is known for its agricultural produce, including sugarcane, tobacco, wheat, maize, and various vegetables. While some indigenous people run small, simple shops, many market stalls are operated by non-indigenous traders. The native Mandani population primarily consists of peasants who lead simple, agrarian lives.

Mandani has long been a centre of local culture and political importance, shaping the region’s history and development.
