= Utmanzai, Charsadda =

Utmanzai
- Town
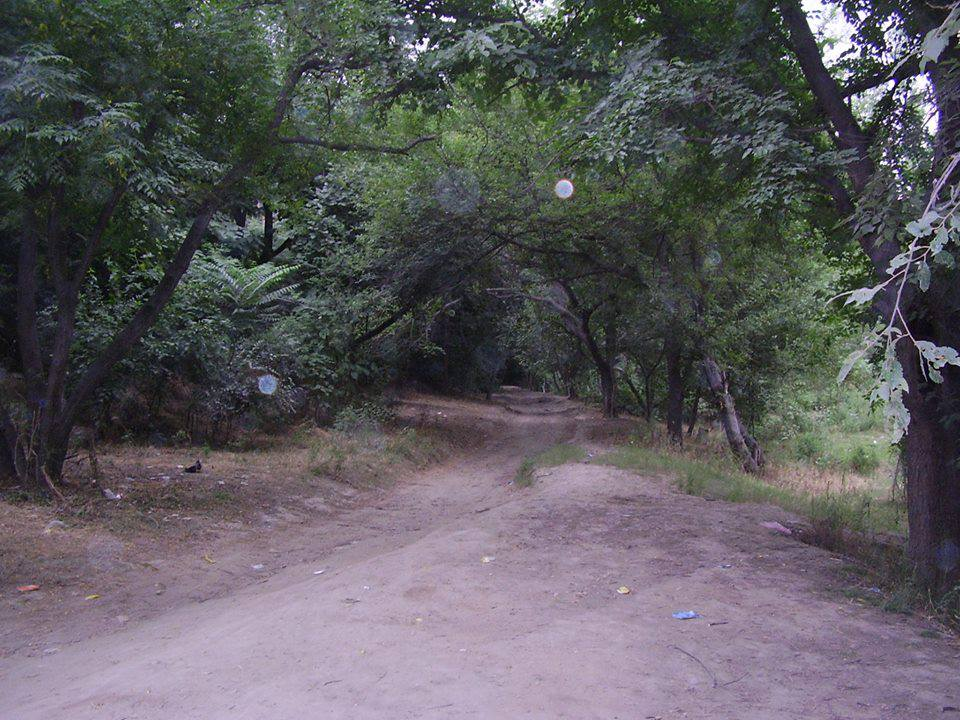
- Utmanzai village.

- Location within Khyber Pakhtunkhwa Location within Pakistan
- Coordinates: 34°11′40.8″N 71°45′56.4″E
- Country: Pakistan
- Province: Khyber Pakhtunkhwa
- Elevation: 390 m (1,280 ft)

Population (2023)
  - Total: 34,257
- Time zone: UTC+5 (PST)

Utmanzai is a town in Charsadda tehsil of Charsadda District in the province of Khyber Pakhtunkhwa, Pakistan. It is located at the border between Mohmand District and Charsadda District.

== Overview ==
It is one of the eight main villages of Hashtnagar (one of the two constituent parts of Charsadda District in Khyber Pakhtunkhwa). It is present on Main Tangi road between Rajjar and Turangzai.

Utmanzai is the birthplace of famous Pakhtun leader and Frontier Gandhi, Khan Abdul Ghaffar Khan (famously known as Bacha Khan). Among other notable political figures, educationalists and thinkers who belong to the village are Khan Abdul Ghani Khan, Khan Abdul Wali Khan, Khan Abdul Ali Khan, Khan Abdul Jabbar Khan (known as Doctor Khan Saib), Major General Akbar Khan, Lala Nisar Muhammad Khan and Lieutenant General Imran Ullah Khan.

Utmanzai, is the centre of regional and national politics because it is the birthplace of Khudai Khidmatgar Tehreek, a movement which played a crucial role in the struggle against British Raj.

The main ethnic group in Utmanzai is Muhammadzai; however, there are further 4–5 ethnic subgroups, including Shamozai, Pareech Khel, Khwazi Khel, Peeran, Katikan, Julagan and several others that are few in number.

== Historical and Ancient places ==
=== Abdul Ghaffar Khan House ===
Abdul Ghaffar Khan (Badshah Khan) house is present in Khwazi Khel an ethnic subgroup in Utmanzai, Charsadda. This is the house where Abdul Ghaffar khan was born.

=== Abdul Ghani Khan Tomb ===
Abdul Ghani Khan a son of Abdul Ghaffar Khan, was a famous poet with significant contributions to Pashto poetry. He is also known as Ghani Baba. His tomb is considered a historical place due to its association with this significant historical figure. Ghani Khan's tomb is situated in the Haji sahib graveyard on Tangi Road near Utmanzai Bazaar.

=== Ghani Khan Derai ===
Ghani Khan Derai (The Mound of Ghani Khan), is a public place situated on Rajjar to Takht Bhai road in the district Charssdda. All the ancient and historical information, equipment, footwear, and dresses, that belonged to Abdul Ghani Khan are gathered there to preserve history.

== Demographics ==
=== Population ===
Historical population
| Year | Pop. | ±% p.a. |
|---|---|---|
| 1951 | 10,272 | — |
| 1961 | 12,610 | +2.07% |
| 1972 | 15,857 | +2.10% |
| 1981 | 18,931 | +1.99% |
| 1998 | 24,848 | +1.61% |
| 2017 | 30,747 | +1.13% |
| 2023 | 34,257 | +1.82% |

As of the 2023 census, Utmanzai had a population of 34,257. According to the 1998 census, The population of Utmanzai was 24,848.

== See also ==
- Shabqadar
- Shabqadar Tehsil
- Charsadda District
