= Agra Kuz =

Agra Juz
- Union council and town
- Location in Pakistan
- Coordinates: 34°6′54″N 71°41′51″E
- Country: Pakistan
- Region: Khyber Pakhtunkhwa
- District: Charsadda District
- Tehsil: Charsadda Tehsil
- Time zone: UTC+5 (PST)

Agra Kuz or Agra is a town and union council of Charsadda District in Khyber Pakhtunkhwa province of Pakistan. It is located at 34°6'54N 71°41'51E and has an altitude of 273 metres (898 feet).
