= Gallai =

Gallai may refer to:

- Gallai, a Pashto language word and feminine name meaning "hail"
- Gallai, Pakistan
- Gallai, Bangladesh
- Tibor Gallai, (1912-1992), a Hungarian mathematician
- Gallai, worshippers of the Phrygian deity Cybele
