= Zaim =

Zaim is a representation of the male Arabic given name Za'im (Arabic: زَعيم / زاعِم), meaning leader, chief. Correspondingly al-Za'im (Arabic: الزعيم) means "the leader".

- Zaim (name)
- Zaim, Căuşeni, a commune in Căuşeni district, Moldova
- Zaim, Khyber Pakhtunkhwa, a town in Khyber Pakhtunkhwa, Pakistan

== See also ==
- Zaimoğlu
