= Sangara =

Sangara may refer to:

- Sangara (King), ruler of Carchemish
- Sangara, Pakistan, village in Khyber Pakhtunkhwa province, Pakistan.
- Sangara, Papua New Guinea, village
