= Behlola =

Behola
- Union council and town
- Location in Pakistan
- Coordinates: 34°15′8″N 71°50′33″E
- Country: Pakistan
- Region: Khyber Pakhtunkhwa
- District: Charsadda District
- Tehsil: Charsadda Tehsil
- Time zone: UTC+5 (PST)

Behlola is a town and union council of Charsadda District in Khyber Pakhtunkhwa province of Pakistan. It is located at 34°15'8N 71°50'33E and has an altitude of 327 metres (1076 feet).
