= Syed Shahenshah =

Pakistani actor (1949–2017)

- Born: 1949; Tangi, Pakistan
- Died: 13 April 2017; Peshawar, Pakistan
- Occupation: Actor

Syed Shahenshah (1949–2017), was a notable Pashto-language actor and artist. He died at the age of 68.

== Plays ==
He was notable for the following plays:

- Sahar
- Tasha Julai
- Lambey
- Swaal
- Da Manzal pa Lore
- Duwayem Noom
- Azmaikht
- Kagay Laray
