= Chindro Dag =

- Union council and town
- Location in Pakistan
- Coordinates: 34°15′8″N 71°50′33″E
- Country: Pakistan
- Province: Khyber Pakhtunkhwa
- District: Charsadda District
- Tehsil: Charsadda Tehsil
- Time zone: UTC+5 (PST)

Chindro Dag is a town and union council of Charsadda District in Khyber Pakhtunkhwa province of Pakistan.
