= Mandan (disambiguation) =

The Mandan are a Native American tribe residing in North Dakota.

Mandan can also refer to:

- Mandan language
- Mandan, North Dakota, town in North Dakota
- Mandan, Michigan, an unincorporated community
- Mandan, Khyber Pakhtunkhwa, town in Pakistan
- Mandan (YTB-794), United States Navy harbor tug
- Fort Mandan, American frontier fort
