= Tupla =

Tupla may refer to

- Tupla (chocolate), a Finnish chocolate bar
- Tupla, Pakistan, a village in Khyber Pakhtunkhwa, Pakistan
