= Saeedabad =

Saeedabad (Urdu: سعيد آباد) may refer to

- Saeedabad, Karachi, neighbourhood of Karachi, Pakistan
- Saeedabad, Khyber Pakhtunkhwa, village in Khyber Pakhtunkhwa, Pakistan
- Saeedabad Taluka, subdivision of Matiari District, Pakistan
- Saidabad (disambiguation), places in Iran
