= Pandak =

Pandak may refer to:

- Lela Pandak Lam (died 1877), a Malay nationalist
- Pandak, Pakistan
