= Miran =

Miran may refer to:

== Places ==
- Miran (Xinjiang), an ancient oasis town in Ruoqiang County, Bayingolin Mongol Autonomous Prefecture, southeastern Xinjiang, western China
- Miran fort, a ruined defensive structure built by the Tibetan Empire, located in southeastern Xinjiang, western China
- Miran, Khyber Pakhtunkhwa, Pakistan
- Miran, Afghanistan, a town in Maidan Wardak Province, Afghanistan
- Miran, Markazi, Iran
- Miran, Sistan and Baluchestan, Iran
- Miran, Haryana, India, see List of villages in Bhiwani district#Tosham tehsil

== People ==
- Miran (name), a given name and surname
- Miran (tribe)

== See also ==
- Mi-ran, Korean given name
