= Attaki =

Pakistani town

Attaki آٹکی ماڈل ٹاؤن آٹکی ماڈل ٹاؤن
- Neighborhood
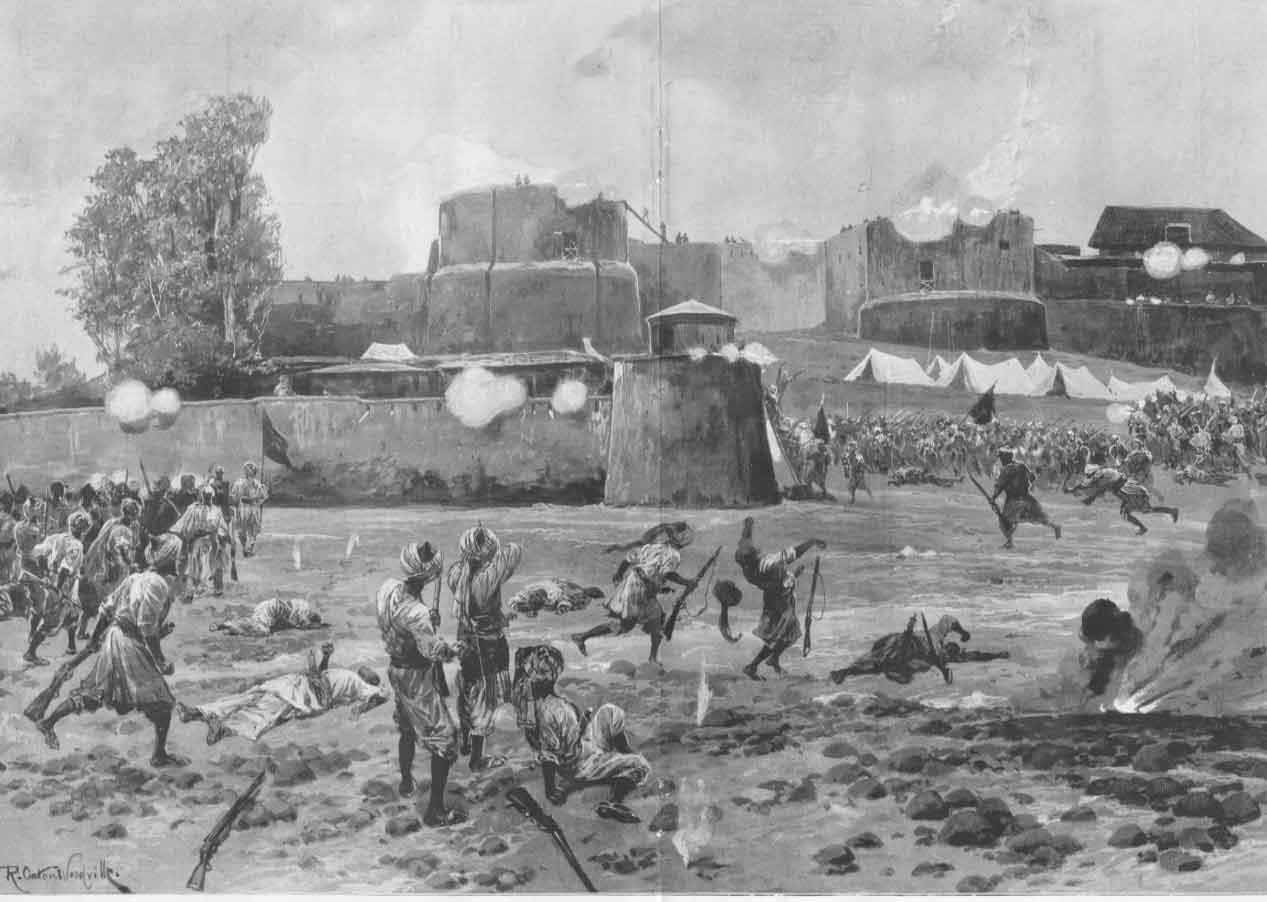
- Clockwise from top: Shabqadar FC Fort

- Flag Seal
- Nickname: Model Town
- Location in Khyber Pakhtunkhwa Location in Pakistan Attaki (Asia) Attaki (Earth)
- Coordinates: 34°12′19.584″N 71°34′59.9448″E
- Village Council Secretary: Atiq Ur Rehman Malik
- union council: Shabqadar MC-3
- Tehsil: Shabqadar
- District: Charsadda
- Capital: Peshawar
- Province: Khyber Pakhtunkhwa
- Country: Pakistan
- Founded: ----

Area
  - Neighborhood: 4.39 km^{2} (1.69 sq mi)

Population (2017)
  - Neighborhood: 16,974
  - Rank: 3rd, Neighborhood in District Charsadda
  - Density: 165/km^{2} (430/sq mi)
  - Urban: 14,453
  - Rural: 2,521
- Time zone: UTC+5 (PKT)
- Postal Code: 24630
- Area code: 091
- Languages: Pashto, Urdu
- HDI (2017): ▲ ###' (high)

Attaki Model Town (Urdu: آٹکی ماڈل ٹاؤن) is a town and neighborhood of Charsadda District in Khyber Pakhtunkhwa province of Pakistan.
