= Abazai =

- Union council and town
- Location in Pakistan
- Coordinates: 34°19′7″N 71°35′35″E
- Country: Pakistan
- Region: Khyber Pakhtunkhwa
- District: Charsadda District
- Tehsil: Tangi Tehsil
- Time zone: UTC+5 (PST)

Abazai is a town and union council in Charsadda District of Khyber Pakhtunkhwa province of Pakistan. It is part of Tangi Tehsil and is located at 34°19'7''N 71°35'35''E at an altitude of 320 metres (1053 feet), lying to the northwest of the district capital Charsadda and 24 miles north of the provincial capital Peshawar on the left bank of the Swat river, a mile from the river's exit from the hills.

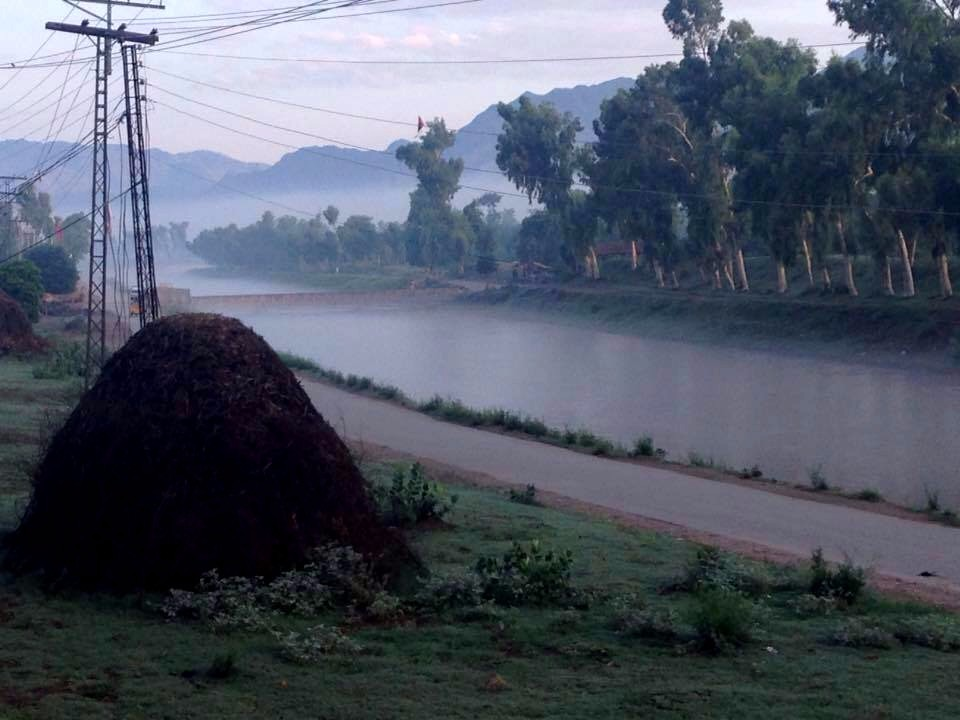
Abazai

== History ==
During British rule, it was a fort and village of Charsadda Tehsil, then part of Peshawar District.

The Imperial Gazetteer of India, compiled in 1908, describes the village and fort as follows:

The river, here 150 yards wide, is crossed by a ferry, and is the highest point in British territory where a ferry is stationed. The fort, which lies between Abazai village and the hills, was constructed in 1852, and has been very effective in preventing raids by the Utman Khel and Mohmands on British territory. It was made over to the border military police in 1894, and is held by 30 men of this force. Its chief interest now consists in the fact that it is close to the headworks of the SWĀT RIVER CANAL.

== Agriculture ==
The soil of Abazai is rich and fertile, it is known for its palatable fruits throughout the province. Mangoes from Abazai which are on lands of the Mian family of Abazai and are sold in fruit mandi in high demand due to their luscious taste. In winters, Orange and kinnow trees could be seen along the road side. Similarly, in winters, jaggery, a by-product of sugar cane, is also produced in a decades old process of jaggery making in "Garaii" (a small confectionery consisting of a crusher and a large cooking pan).
