= Ghojalai =

- Village
- Location within Pakistan
- Coordinates: 34.46°N 72.17°E
- Country: Pakistan
- Province: Khyber Pakhtunkhwa
- Elevation: 1,024 m (3,360 ft)
- Time zone: UTC+5 (PST)

Ghojalai is a village in Swat District of Khyber Pakhtunkhwa. It is at an altitude of 1,024 metres (3,360 ft). The village is located 143 kilometres (89 mi) north of the capital, Islamabad. Neighbouring settlements include Kabbal and Ghamjaba.
