= Battagram, Charsadda =

Battagram
- Union council and town
- Location in Pakistan
- Coordinates: 34°13′7″N 71°37′33″E
- Country: Pakistan
- District: Charsadda District
- Region: Khyber Pakhtunkhwa
- Tehsil: Shabqadar
- Time zone: UTC+5 (PST)

Battagram is a town and union council of Charsadda District in Khyber Pakhtunkhwa province of Pakistan. It is located at 34°13'7N 71°37'33E and at an altitude of 300 meters (987 feet), and is the headquarters of Battagram District. The town borders the village of Kharaki.
