= Noor Jalal Ghari =

Noor Jalal Ghari, also known as Karamdin Ghari, is a village of Gadoon Amazai, located near Swabi, Khyber Pakhtunkhwa, Pakistan.

The village was formed by Noor Jalal Khan, a descendant of Ahmed Khan Baba, who came first to the Amazai area. People of both the villages of Kupri and Noor Jalal Ghari (Karamdin Ghari) are of the same caste of Pukhtoon tribe Yousufzai.

The elders of the area were known for their great achievements for the development of the whole area.

Agriculture is the main source of income for the people of the area. There is a primary school in the village, but students have to go far away from the village to take further education. There are hardly any health facilities available in the area, which sometimes cause critical problems for the people of the area.
