= Daulat Pura =

Daulat Pura دولت پورہ دولت پورہ
- Union Council
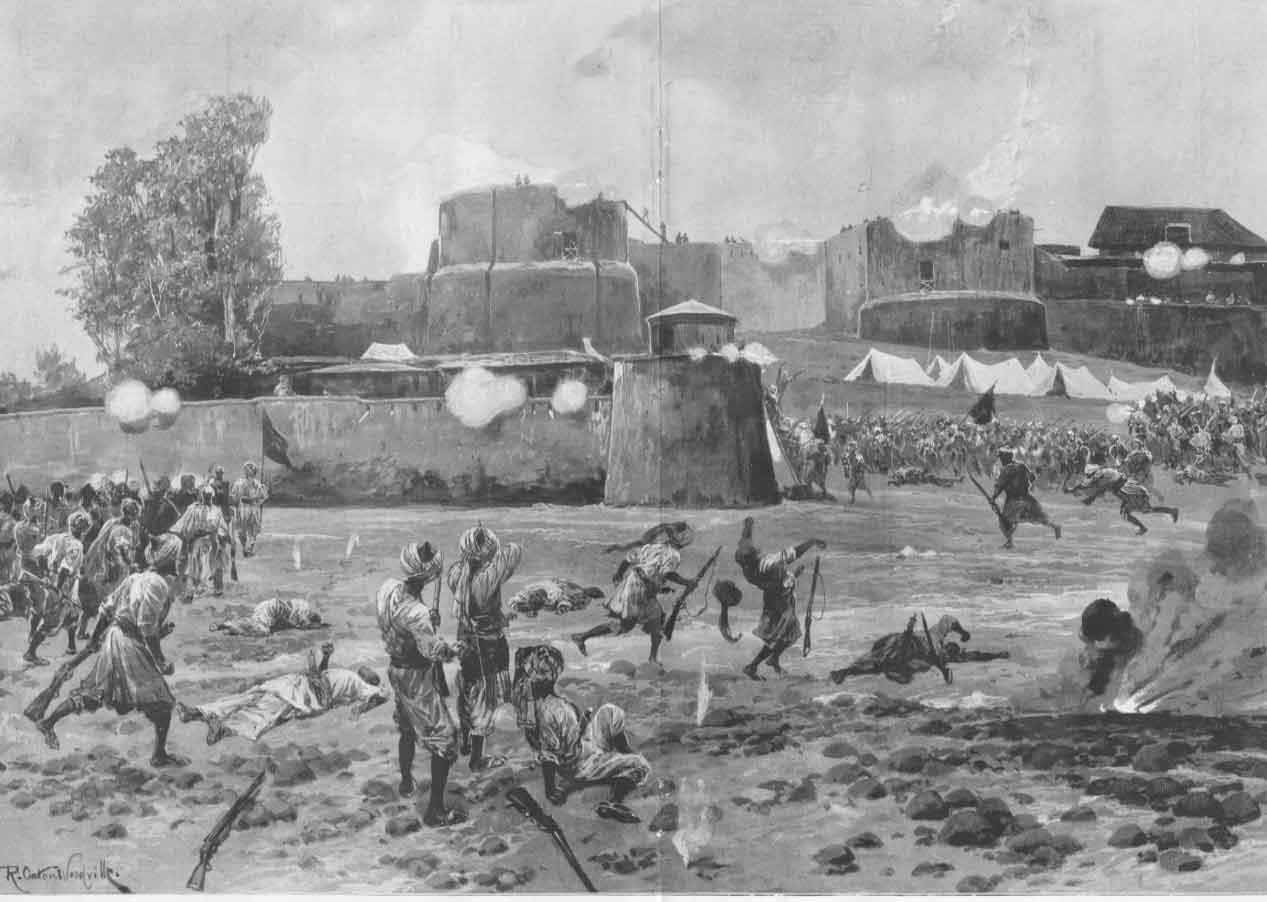
- Shabqadar FC Fort

- Flag Seal

- Location in Khyber Pakhtunkhwa Location in Pakistan Daulat Pura (Asia) Daulat Pura (Earth)
- Coordinates: 34°11′03.3″N 71°39′35.5″E
- Village Council Secretary: Atiq Ur Rehman Malik
- Tehsil: Shabqadar
- District: Charsadda
- Capital: Peshawar
- Province: Khyber Pakhtunkhwa
- Country: Pakistan

Area
  - Union Council: 4.2 km^{2} (1.6 sq mi)

Population (2017)
  - Union Council: 12,191
  - Rank: ---, Charsadda
  - Density: 2,900/km^{2} (7,500/sq mi)
  - Urban: ---
  - Rural: ---
- Time zone: UTC+5 (PKT)
- Postal code: 24630
- Area code: 091
- Languages: Pashto

Daulat Pura (Urdu: دولت پورہ) Daulat Pura is a town and union council of Charsadda District in Khyber Pakhtunkhwa province of Pakistan.

The Village Secretary is the Khyber Pakhtunkhwa Local Government Secretary for the Ministry of Local Government (Local Division), usually belonging to the Pakistan Administrative Service.
