= Sirsanai =

- Location within Pakistan
- Coordinates: 34.49°N 72.17°E
- Country: Pakistan
- Province: Khyber Pakhtunkhwa
- Elevation: 911 m (2,989 ft)
- Time zone: UTC+5 (PKT)

Sirsanai, also spelt Sarsinai, is a village in the Khyber Pakhtunkhwa province of Pakistan. It is located at 34°49'0N 72°17'0E with an altitude of 911 metres (2992 feet). Neighbouring settlements include Khemdarra and Kabbal.
