= Mama Khel Banoochi =

- Town and union council
- Country: Pakistan
- Province: Khyber-Pakhtunkhwa
- District: Bannu District
- Time zone: UTC+5 (PST)

Mama Khel Banoochi is a town and union council in Bannu District of Khyber-Pakhtunkhwa.

== See also ==
- Mama Khel

Mama Khel is a Union Council in Bannu. In Mama Khel there one Higher secondary school for boys and one for girls, and numbers of primary and Middle schools for boys and girls. The Most significant thing of Mama Khel is its literacy rate which is highest in all Bannu which is almost 90%. The famous pushto singer Nader Ashna belongs to Mama Khel. Mama Khel are famous for agricultural activities. The people of mama khel are very hard working. New generation are turning their attention towards UAE. Most of the people are working over there to feed their families. Mr. Ahmad Ali Khan is a Teacher at Pennell High School & Girls College Bannu. He is completing his MS English (Research in progress) from Qurtaba University D.I.Khan.
