= Katozai =

Coordinates: 34°16′54″N 71°35′53″E

- Town and union council Katozai
- Interactive map of Katozai
- Country: Pakistan
- Province: Khyber Pakhtunkhwa
- District: Charsadda District

Population
  - Total: about 20,000
- Time zone: UTC+5 (PST)

Katozai is a town and union council of Charsadda District in Khyber Pakhtunkhwa province of Pakistan. It is located at 34°16'54N 71°35'53E and has an altitude of 327 metres (1076 feet). Here many sub branches of Pashtoon Yousafzai tribe are settled like( Mehmood Kheil, Sardar Kheil, Chawal Kheil, ada kheil ,Pasand Kheil, Ajab Kheil ,shamat Kheil , arbafan ), and other tribe like syeed , miaghan , qazi ,Utman Kheil etc.
