= Mita Khel =

Coordinates: 33°0′59″N 70°54′12″E

- Town and union council
- Interactive map of Mita Khel
- Country: Pakistan
- Province: Khyber-Pakhtunkhwa
- District: Bannu District
- Time zone: UTC+5 (PST)

Mita Khel is a town and union council in Bannu District of Khyber-Pakhtunkhwa. It is located at 33°0'59N 70°54'12E and has an altitude of 372 metres (1223).
