= Mohandri =

- Village and union council
- Country: Pakistan
- Region: Khyber-Pakhtunkhwa
- District: Mansehra District
- Time zone: UTC+5 (PST)
- Postal code: 21301

Mohandri is a village and union council (an administrative subdivision) of Mansehra District in the Khyber-Pakhtunkhwa province of Pakistan. It is located in the north east of the district and borders the Neelum and Muzaffarabad districts of Azad Kashmir. It lies in an area affected by the 2005 Kashmir earthquake.
