= Gorraki =

Gorraki is a village in Haripur district in Khyber Pakhtunkhwa, Pakistan. Gorraki is the main hub for nearby Bandaa (small villages). Sub divisions include Jarral Awan and Kutab Shahi Awan.

Residents regularly face a water shortage.

== Education ==
Gorraki has two primary schools - one for boys and one for girls.

== Demographics ==
The majority of the villagers belong to the caste "Awan".

Most of the residents have migrated to Haripur.
