= Garyala =

Coordinates: 34°16′0″N 72°13′0″E

- Town and union council
- Interactive map of Garyala
- Country: Pakistan
- Province: Khyber-Pakhtunkhwa
- District: Mardan District
- Time zone: UTC+5 (PST)

Garyala is a town and union council in Mardan District of Khyber-Pakhtunkhwa. It is located at 34°16'0N 72°13'0E and has an altitude of 317 metres (1043 feet).
