= Ghafe =

Ghafe باكستان Ghafe
- Interactive map of Ghafe
- Coordinates: 34°32′42″N 72°20′08″E
- Country: Pakistan
- Time zone: PST

Ghafe (باكستان) is a village located in Mardan District of Khyber-Pakhtunkhwa. Nearby is Takht-i-Bahi Buddhist temple.
