= Mitha Khel =

Coordinates: 33°0′59″N 70°54′12″E

Mitha Khel is a village and Union Council in Karak District of Khyber-Pakhtunkhwa province of Pakistan. It is located at 33°08'43N 71°11'21E with an altitude of 372 metres (1223 feet).

Mitha Khel An important town in District Karak.

== Water Resources ==
Mitha Khel, one of the union councils of District Karak, is running out of the fresh underground water resources. Overcrowding has resulted in more use of tube-well water resulting in depletion of fresh underground water levels and making them saline. Government-led deep-seated machines have been installed to fetch up water to cater to the needs of the inhabitants yet they are adding to miseries of the people as they are unable to irrigate their lands with ample amount of water. Being located amidst of Salt Mountains, water shedding down becomes increasingly bitter leaving people in constraints to bring water from distant locations to fulfill their needs. A ray of hope are the construction of small dams to store rainwater.

Mitha Khel is the heart of District Karak. There are many schools and colleges for boys and girls. Mitha Khel has a big bazzar and people come from different villages. Mitha Khel is Famous for generosity.

== Education ==
Education ratio of Mitha Khel is high compared to other villages of Karak. The literacy rate in Mitha Khel is above 80%.

There is one government high school for boys, another for girls, and many primary schools for both girls and boys. There are number of private schools and colleges.
