= Qaāgai =

Coordinates: 34°42′15″N 073°02′00″E

Qaāgai is a village in Khyber-Pakhtunkhwa province of Pakistan.
