= Nari Panoos =

Nari Panoos is a village and Union Council of Karak District in Khyber Pakhtunkhwa province of Pakistan. It is located at 33°10′57″N 71°9′46″E with an altitude of 678 metres (2227 feet) and is an area where salt is mined.

== Description ==
Nari Panos is located about 13 kilometers to the north of the city of Karak. It is included in the tehsil Banda Daud shah of district Karak. Nari Panos is union council. The village is rich in Salt mines and the length of mountains containing salt is about 23 kilometers extending from Bhahadar Khel to Spina. Nari Panos is also rich in elements of uranium, gas, oil, and other precious things.

Nari Panos is surrounded by Spina at east, Enzarpayan at North, Dagar Nari at West and Salt mountains is its limit boundary with city Karak. Literacy rate of the village is 70 percent and almost every child is on his/her way to school, The focus on education started very early on as the area is dry and agriculture mostly is dependent upon rain so people since the time of independence have started to educate their children resulting in generations of doctors, engineers, teachers, armed officers, civil servants, social activists and nearly every important post in government and bureaucracy.

Several serving and retired servicemen and officers of the Pakistan Armed forces hail from Nari Panos. The village population takes pride in taking military service as a choice of profession keeping alive the rich traditions of their ancestors and hardworking people.

Now the oil and gas companies are looking for mines extraction in "Nari Panos" and "Banda Daud Shah" and already MOL is working in these tehsils however water is a big issue in the region due to dry land.
