= Landiwa =

Coordinates: 32°44′52″N 70°57′57″E

Landiwah
- Union council and town
- Interactive map of Landiwah
- Country: Pakistan
- Province: Khyber-Pakhtunkhwa
- District: Lakki Marwat District
- Time zone: UTC+5 (PST)

Landiwah is a town surrounded by green fields and union council in Lakki Marwat District of Khyber-Pakhtunkhwa, Pakistan. It is located at 32°44'52N 70°57'57E and has an altitude of 303 metres (997 feet).
