= Gulzari =

- Location within Pakistan
- Coordinates: 32.36°N 70.31°E
- Country: Pakistan
- Province: Khyber Pakhtunkhwa
- Elevation: 360 m (1,180 ft)
- Time zone: UTC+5 (PST)

Gulzari is a village in Lakki Marwat District of Khyber Pakhtunkhwa. It is located at 32°36'48N 70°31'52E with an altitude of 360 metres (1184 feet).
