= Nisatta =

Coordinates: 34°6′8″N 71°47′47″E

Nisatta Nisaia, Nysa (in ancient Greeks) and Nysian
- Town and union council
- Interactive map of Nisatta
- Country: Pakistan
- Province: Khyber Pakhtunkhwa
- District: Charsadda District

Population
  - Total: 90,200
- Time zone: UTC+5 (PST)
- Postal code: 24450

Nisatta (Pushto: نسته) also referred to as Nisaia, Nysa (in ancient Greeks) and Nysian is a town and union council of Charsadda District in Khyber Pakhtunkhwa province of Pakistan. It is located at 34°6'8N 71°47'47E and has an altitude of 277 metres (912 feet).

== Geography ==
Four rivers: Sardaryab River, Khialey River, Jindey River and Shalam River meet in Nisatta forming a larger river which the local pashtuns call Landey River (Kabul River) which flows along Nowshehra and at Kund (Attock) joins Abaseen (Indus River). The population of Nisatta is around 90,000.

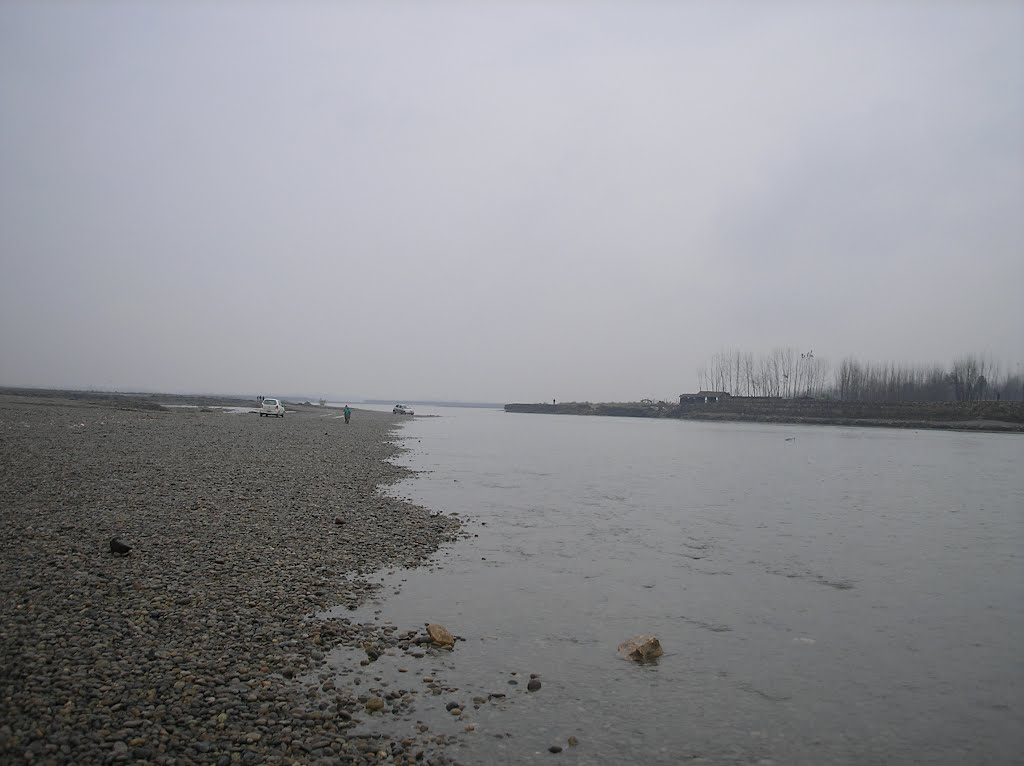
Sardaryab River

== Food and culture ==
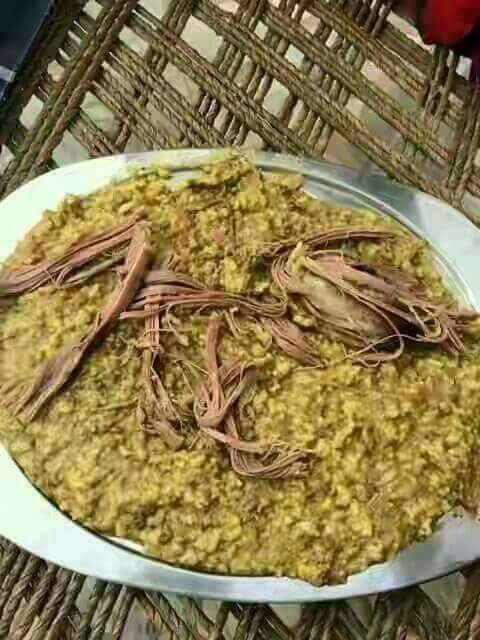
Motta Chawal

Nisatta, Charsadda is famous for its culture and its unique dish, Motta Chawal (Big Rice). In traditional weddings, Motta Chawal is a staple food served to guests.

== Recent History ==
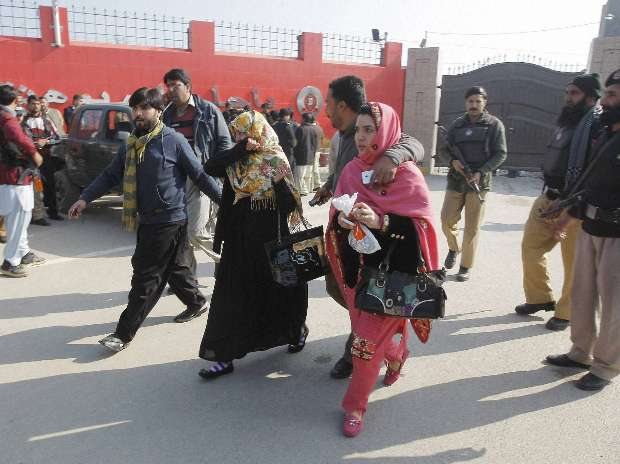
bacha khan university charsadda, Nisatta attack

In January 2016, Bacha Khan University was attacked by four Taliban suicide fighters, killing twenty-one people and injuring seventeen. The university's private security force slowed the attack before authorities arrived to assist. Four attackers died in the battle bringing the overall total death toll to twenty-five.
