= Hathi Mera =

Hathimera is an old village in the District of Mansehra in Pakistan.

The village is located approximately 8 km (5.0 mi) from Mansehra city, nearby to the villages of Gandhian and Mongan and the Hazara University. As a voting constituency, it belongs to PK-53 Mansehra.

The village has one primary school and post office for the many tribe s living in Hathimera, including Pathan=(Yousafzai)(Gujjar), (Swati), (Awan) and (Maliks), who are the Four major tribes of the village.

== Demographics ==
The population of Hati Mera, according to 2025 census was 4,128.
