= Muryali =

Coordinates: 31°49′0″N 70°54′0″E

- Town and union council
- Interactive map of Muryali
- Country: Pakistan
- Province: NWFP
- District: Dera Ismail Khan District
- Time zone: UTC+5 (PST)

Muryali or Muriali is a town and union council in Dera Ismail Khan District of Khyber-Pakhtunkhwa, Pakistan. It is located at 31°49'0N 70°54'0E and has an altitude of 164 metres (541 feet).
