= Chathi =

- Location within Pakistan
- Coordinates: 34.7°N 72.58°E
- Country: Pakistan
- Province: Khyber Pakhtunkhwa
- Elevation: 625 m (2,051 ft)
- Time zone: UTC+5 (PST)

Chathi, also spelt Chatthi, is a village of Haripur District in the Khyber Pakhtunkhwa province of Pakistan. It is part of Beer Union Council and is located at 34°7'0N 72°58'0E with an altitude of 625 metres (2053 feet).
