= Kot Jai =

- Town and union council
- Interactive map of Kot Jai
- Country: Pakistan
- Province: Khyber-Pakhtunkhwa
- District: Paharpur District
- Time zone: UTC+5 (PST)

Kot Jai is a town and union council in Paharpur District of Khyber-Pakhtunkhwa, Pakistan. It is located at 32°10′0″N 71°6′0″E and has an altitude of 178 metres (584 ft).

Kot Jai has a population of over 10,000. Facilities include a bank, a post office, schools, and a bazaar of about 200 shops.

It is situated about 43 km from Dera Ismail Khan, 18 km from Paharpur Tehsil, 44 km from Chasmma Berrege and 58 km from Mianwali District. Nearby villages include Meran Jai (Lundi) to the east, Jara one km to the west where there is a great Muddrassa "Baab un Najaf Jara", Dhakki 4.5 km to the north, Sadalian and Khanu Khel about 1.5 to 2 km to the south.

A hospital of about 20 beds is operational day and night. There are high schools for both boys and girls, four primary schools for boys, and one primary school for girls. Private institutes include Al-Hudabia Public High School, Minnhaj Public School and Al-Quraish Public School. There is also a veterinary hospital. To help farmers sell their animals, a market is held every week on Saturday by a government contractor. The town is situated at a bank of Chasma road. It also had a bus stand, where a convenience facility is available between Dera Ismail Khan and Kot Jai. Every year a cattle show (bull race) is held there and a show of camels weight lifting where winners are awarded with prizes and praise.
