= Khandar Khan Khel =

- Town and union council thal wazir(Big villages are Karab Killa, Azim Killa, Landi Jalander and Saifal khel)
- Country: Pakistan
- Province: Khyber Pakhtunkhwa
- District: Bannu District

Government
  - Type: local body
- Time zone: UTC+5 (PST)

Khandar Khan Khel is a town and union council in Bannu District of Khyber Pakhtunkhwa.
