= Nar Abu Samand Begu Khel =

Coordinates: 32°48′45″N 70°47′21″E

- Union council and town
- Interactive map of Nar Abu Samand Begu Khel
- Country: Pakistan
- Province: Khyber-Pakhtunkhwa
- District: Lakki Marwat District
- Time zone: UTC+5 (PST)

Nar Abu Samand Begu Khel is a town and union council in Lakki Marwat District of Khyber-Pakhtunkhwa. It is located at 32°48'45N 70°47'21E and has an altitude of 261 metres (859 feet).
