= Kewal =

Coordinates: 34°31′N 72°59′E

Kawai کاوائی
- Village
- Interactive map of Kawai
- Country: Pakistan
- Region: Khyber-Pakhtunkhwa
- District: Mansehra District
- Time zone: UTC+5 (PST)

Kawai is a village and union council (an administrative subdivision) of Mansehra District in the Khyber-Pakhtunkhwa province of Pakistan. It is located in the northeast of the district on the side of Ghanool and lies in an area that was affected by the 2005 Kashmir earthquake.
