= Jalala =

Jalala جلالہ
- Village and union council
- Interactive map of Jalala
- Coordinates: 34°20′8″N 71°54′10″E
- Country: Pakistan
- Region: Khyber Pakhtunkhwa
- District: Mardan District
- Tehsil: Takht Bhai
- Elevation: 339 m (1,112 ft)
- Time zone: UTC+5 (PST)
- Website: geocities.ws/incrediblejalala

Jalala (Urdu: جلالہ, romanized: Jalālah) is a village and union council in Mardan District of Khyber Pakhtunkhwa, Pakistan. It is located at 34°20′8″N 71°54′10″E, roughly 20 kilometers north of Mardan, at an altitude of 339 meters (1,115 feet).
