= Jabar Kili =

Shadi khel غازی خان
- Location within Pakistan
- Coordinates: 32.59°N 70.35°E
- Country: Pakistan
- Province: Khyber Pakhtunkhwa

Government
  - SDO: Ghazi khan
  - SDO: Ghazi khan

Area
  - Total: 132 km^{2} (51 sq mi)
- Elevation: 361 m (1,184 ft)

Population (1998)
  - Total: 5k
- Time zone: UTC+5 (PST)
- Calling code: 28420

shadi khel غازی خان is a village in Bannu District of Khyber Pakhtunkhwa. It is located at 32°59'1N 70°35'19E with an altitude of 361 metres (1,187 feet).
