= Lalo Bandai =

Coordinates: 34°51′53″N 72°21′59″E

Lalo Bandai is a village in Koza Bandai union council, Neikpekhai tehsil, in the Swat District of Khyber Pakhtunkhwa, Pakistan. It is located 14 kilometres north of Mingora and southwest of Matta. The village is inhabited by people from the Yousfzai tribe.
