= Kalu Maira =

- Location within Pakistan
- Coordinates: 34.03°N 73.06°E
- Country: Pakistan
- Province: Khyber Pakhtunkhwa
- Elevation: 840 m (2,760 ft)
- Time zone: UTC+5 (PST)

Kalu Maira is a village in the Khyber Pakhtunkhwa Province of Pakistan. It is located at 34°3'0N 73°6'0E with an altitude of 840 metres (2759 feet).
