= Lar, Khyber Pakhtunkhwa =

Coordinates: 32°5′30″N 71°4′15″E

Lar, Khyber-Pakhtunkhwa
- Town and union council
- Interactive map of Lar, Khyber-Pakhtunkhwa
- Country: Pakistan
- Province: Khyber-Pakhtunkhwa
- District: Paharpur District
- Time zone: UTC+5 (PST)

Lar is a town and union council in Paharpur District of Khyber-Pakhtunkhwa. It is located at 32°5'30N 71°4'15E and has an altitude of 184 metres (606 feet).
