= Jaswal Pani =

- Location within Pakistan
- Coordinates: 34.05°N 73.06°E
- Country: Pakistan
- Province: Khyber Pakhtunkhwa
- Elevation: 1,412 m (4,633 ft)
- Time zone: UTC+5 (PST)

Jaswal Pani is a village in Abbottabad District of Khyber Pakhtunkhwa province of Pakistan. It is located at 34°4'50N 73°6'30E with an altitude of 1412 metres (4635 feet).
