= Labarkot =

Coordinates: 34°21′N 73°14′E

- Village and union council
- Interactive map of Labarkot
- Country: Pakistan
- Region: Khyber-Pakhtunkhwa
- District: Mansehra District
- Time zone: UTC+5 (PST)

Labarkot is a village and union council (an administrative subdivision) of Mansehra District in Khyber-Pakhtunkhwa province of Pakistan. It is located at 34°21'0N 73°13'60E

== Tribes ==
- Gujjar (Khattana)
- Tanoli
- Swati
- Sulaimankhel
- Khattak
- Mulakhel, Malakhail
- Ibrahimkhel
- Turk
- Rajpoots
- Awan.
