= Dandoqa =

Coordinates: 34°10′50″N 72°18′56″E

Dandoqa (Urdu: ڈنڈوقہ) is a village in Swabi District of Khyber-Pakhtunkhwa, Pakistan. It is located at 34°10'50N 72°18'56E with an altitude of 319 metres (1049 feet). It is surrounded by the villages of Tarakai, Yarhussain, Dagi and Sikandari on its north, west, east south respectively. Its population is 4000 to 7000 (2007). The entire village mostly has an arid climate with minimum rainfall. The land is mostly of agricultural use and the population is multi-racial.
