= Dhap Shumali =

- Town and union council
- Country: Pakistan
- Province: Khyber-Pakhtunkhwa
- District: Paharpur District
- Time zone: UTC+5 (PST)

Dhap Shumali (sometimes written Dhup Shumali) is a town and union council in Paharpur District of Khyber-Pakhtunkhwa.
