= Zira Khel =

- Village
- Location within Khyber Pakhtunkhwa
- Coordinates: 33.14°N 70.15°E
- Country: Pakistan
- Province: Khyber Pakhtunkhwa
- District: North Waziristan
- Tehsil: Datta Khel
- Elevation: 842 m (2,762 ft)

Population (2017)
  - Total: 959
  - Estimate
- Time zone: UTC+5 (PST)

Zira Khel is a village in the Khyber Pakhtunkhwa province of Pakistan. It is located at 33°14'0N 70°15'16E with an altitude of 842 metres (2765 feet) and lies close to the border with Afghanistan.
