= Chamnaka =

Village in Pakistan

Chamnaka is a village in the Abbottabad District of Khyber Pakhtunkhwa province of Pakistan. Chamnaka, the most renowned village in Abbottabad district, has been inhabited by the Jadoon tribe for an extended period. The literacy rate in the village is exceptionally high, approaching 85%, and a significant portion of its population comprises graduates and PhD holders. Notably, one of the most esteemed physicians, the late Dr Naseer Khan Jadoon VC, Bahauddin Zakariya University, Multan, hailed from Chamnaka. Additionally, Khan Sultan Muhammad Khan and Khan Rehmat Khan served as magistrates in the surrounding area. Dr Faiz alam from GPGC No 1 Abbottabad (world biggest comedian) renowned for his funny English as well as Urdu accent, also belongs from Chamnaka. Chamnaka is renowned for its exceptional sports prowess, particularly in horse riding and volleyball. Several notable athletes from the village have achieved national recognition in these sports. The village’s agricultural land is predominantly utilized for farming purposes. Honourable Amirulla Khan of Chamnaka was recognized for his significant contributions to the development of the Zamandri in 1906 and was awarded a certificate of the fourth grade and Rs 25 in awarded money. 18 остовer 1906. Donald, Deputy Commissioner, Hazara
