= Muslimabad Kohat =

Village in Pakistan

Coordinates: 33°28′27.51″N 71°24′30.68″E

Muslimabad Kohat is a village of Kohat District of Khyber Pakhtunkhwa, Pakistan.
