= Jandri =

Jandrai /jandrai/jandrai is urdu meaning of watermill. The village Jhandri is, named after that, in Union Council in Karak District of Khyber Pakhtunkhwa, Pakistan. It is located at 33°11′N 71°15′E with an altitude of 741 metres (2,434 feet).
