= Shore Kot =

- Town and union council
- Country: Pakistan
- Province: Khyber-Pakhtunkhwa
- District: Dera Ismail Khan District
- Time zone: UTC+5 (PST)

Shore Kot is a town and union council in Dera Ismail Khan District of Khyber-Pakhtunkhwa.
