= Kiri Shamozai =

Coordinates: 31°24′30″N 70°29′8″E

- Town and union council
- Interactive map of Kiri Shamozai
- Country: Pakistan
- Province: Khyber-Pakhtunkhwa
- District: Dera Ismail Khan District
- Time zone: UTC+5 (PST)

Kiri Shamozai is a town and union council in Dera Ismail Khan District of Khyber-Pakhtunkhwa. It is located at 31°24'30N 70°29'8E and has an altitude of 212 metres (698 feet).
