= Tajwal Utli =

- Location within Pakistan
- Coordinates: 34.00°N 73.21°E
- Country: Pakistan
- Province: Khyber Pakhtunkhwa
- Elevation: 1,957 m (6,421 ft)
- Time zone: UTC+5 (PST)

Tajwal Utli is a village in Abbottabad District of Khyber Pakhtunkhwa province of Pakistan.
