= Khan Mahi =

Coordinates: 34°13′31″N 71°52′27″E

Khan Mahi chairman VC since 2015 is
- Town and union council
- Interactive map of Khan Mahi
- Country: Pakistan
- Province: Khyber-Pakhtunkhwa
- District: Charsadda District
- Time zone: UTC+5 (PST)

Khan Mahi is a town and union council in Charsadda District of Khyber-Pakhtunkhwa. It is located at 34°13'31N 71°52'27E and has an altitude of 309 metres (1017 feet). In local bodies elections held in General Musharraf Era First Nazim of union council khanmahi was Dost Muhammad khan umaray and second and the last nazim was Saif Ullah Khan.
