= Khadizai =

Village in pakistan

Khadizai is a village in the Kohat District of the Khyber Pakhtunkhwa province of Pakistan. This village has a significant Shia(Muslims) population. There is also a shrine of Syed Shah Awliya Badshah, Shah Syed Khalil Baba, Shah Noor Ziyarat, Shah Dargha Ziyarat, and Bibi Char Gul Bibi.
