= Sarozai =

Coordinates: 33°25′N 70°47′E

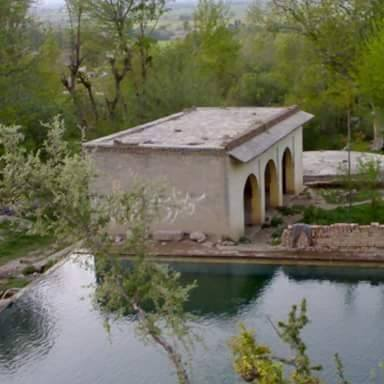

Sarozai is a village in the tehsil Thal District hangu of Khyber Pakhtunkhwa province of Pakistan, in the Hangu District of KPK (Pakistan). Sarozai is on the right bank of the Kurram River. The total area of the Sarozai is about 2,545 square kilometers (983 sq mi). There is a jungle in the village of Sarozai where people come to hunt.

== Demographics ==
The 2017-2018 census counted a total population of 13,587.

== Education ==
The education level of Sarozai is high relative to the Hangu District. Sarozai has three private schools and three government schools and one islamic madrasa for women. The primary schools are separated into a boys primary school and a girls primary school.

=== Private Schools & Colleges ===
1. Paradise Children Academy & Model College Sarozai.

2. Eden House Education System sarozai

=== Government Schools ===
1. Government Primary School Sarozai (Boys)

2. Government Middle School Sarozai (Girls)

3. Government High School Sarozai

=== Islamic Madrasa ===
1. Taleem ul Islamia Lilbanat
