= Math, Khyber Pakhtunkhwa =

Math
- Location within Pakistan
- Coordinates: 34.50°N 71.47°E
- Country: Pakistan
- Province: Khyber Pakhtunkhwa
- Elevation: 1,083 m (3,553 ft)
- Time zone: UTC+5 (PST)

Math is a village of the Khyber Pakhtunkhwa Province of Pakistan. It is located at 34°50'22N 71°47'12E with an altitude of 1083 metres (3556 feet).
