= Bilkanai =

Human settlement in Pakistan

Coordinates: 35°02′N 72°45′E

Bilakani village is situated in Shangla District of Khyber Pakhtunkhwa, Pakistan, almost 3,000 meters (9,800 ft) above sea level.

According to the 2017 census, the village has an estimated population of 11,251 people and 1501 Homes.

The village has government primary and middle school for boys and a primary school for girls.

The main source of income for most of the villagers is wages inside and outside the country and some people engage in agriculture. While few people doing jobs in public or private sector.

Bilkani was damaged by earthquakes in 1974 and 2005, with many people suffering damage. It was also hit severely during 2010 floods which caused some deaths and a number of casualties and left many people homeless.
