= Hajia Gali =

- Location within Pakistan
- Coordinates: 34.01474787°N 73.20969343°E
- Country: Pakistan
- Province: Khyber-Pakhtunkhwa
- District: Abbottabad
- Tehsil: Havelian
- Union Council: Nara

Government
  - Nazim: Sajjad
  - Naib Nazim: Sardar Saleem Raza

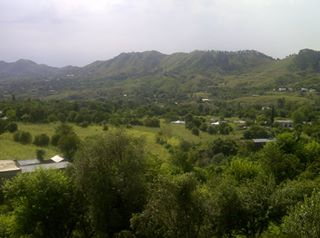
A view of Hajia Gali

Hajia Gali is a village of Abbottabad District in the Khyber Pakhtunkhwa province, Pakistan, it is located in Havelian Tehsil. The village contains a civil dispensary (a government-run outpatient clinic that provides basic healthcare services).
