= Sajkot =

Sajkot is a village of Abbottabad District in Khyber-Pakhtunkhwa province of Pakistan. It is part of the Union Council of Dewal Manal and is located at 34°0′0″N 73°17′0″E with an altitude of 1530 metres (5022 feet).
