= Titar Khel Guli Jan =

- Union council and town
- Country: Pakistan
- Province: Khyber-Pakhtunkhwa
- District: Lakki Marwat District
- Time zone: UTC+5 (PST)

Titar Khel Guli Jan is a town and union council in Lakki Marwat District of Khyber-Pakhtunkhwa.
