= Toru, Mardan =

Toru
- Village
- Nickname: Adk Susral
- Location within Pakistan
- Coordinates: 34°9′50.85″N 72°5′3.95″E
- Country: Pakistan
- Province: Khyber Pakhtunkhwa
- Districts of Pakistan: Mardan
- Elevation: 291 m (955 ft)

== Toru Mardan ==
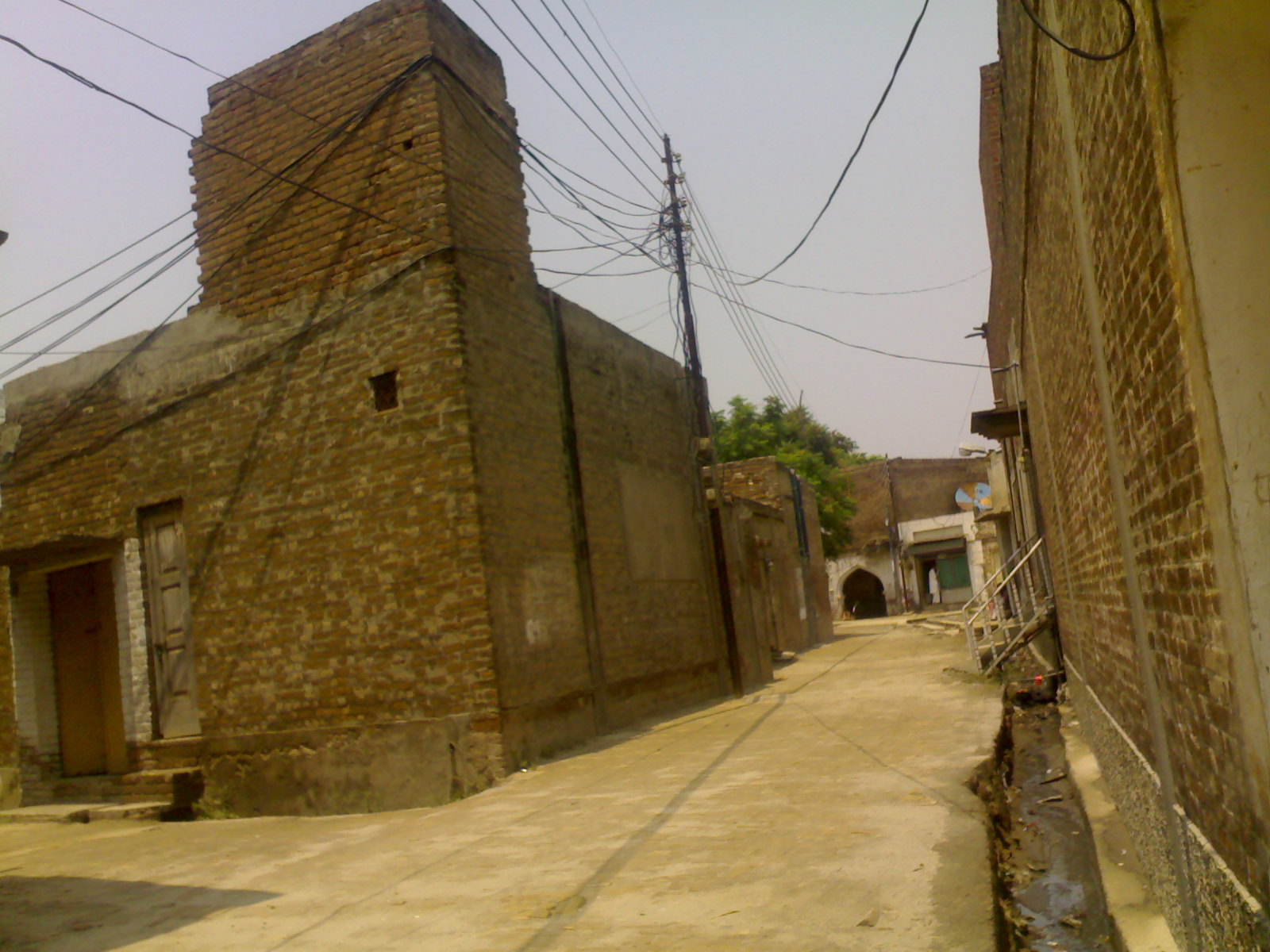
A street in Toru, Pakistan

Toru is a village and union council in Mardan District of Khyber Pakhtunkhwa. It has an altitude of 291 m (958 feet). The inhabitants of Toru are Yousafzai Pashtun, tracing their origin to central Asia and Afghanistan in particular.

== Location ==
Toru is located South of Mardan City, surrounded by two perennial nullahs called Kalpani and Balar; the former descends down from the heights of Malakand to the plains of this vast, fertile tract, while the later comes from the adjacent district of Swabi.
