= Toordand =

Village in Pakistan

Toordand (Urdu: طورڈنڈ) is a small village of Khyber Pakhtunkhwa, Pakistan. The union council is "Janoobi Ward Karak City".

== History ==
About 50 years ago, there was a pond in this place whose water looked blackish. So this place became famous as Toordand because Toor means blackish in Pashto language. Then people started living around this pond and the village formed.

== Location and geography ==
It is located, between Bannu Road and Indus Highway, in the west of the Karak city of Khyber Pakhtunkhwa. The area of the village is about 4.5 square km. The neighbouring areas are Tapi Kala, Kanda Kala, Sur Dag and Ambiri Kala.

== Population and literacy rate ==
About 6000 people live in Toordand. The literacy rate is more than 60%.

== Climate ==
The weather in summer is hot and in winter it is cold. The rate of rain fall is also moderate.

== Language ==
The native language of this region is Pashto.

== Culture ==
The common dress of the inhabitants is Shalwaar Qameez. Most of the population live in mud houses. The common eatables of the people of this village are Saag, Chattni, Lassi, Deodi and Pyasa etc.

== Religion ==
Almost all of the population follow the religion of Islam.

== Agriculture and occupation ==
Most of the people of this village do jobs in different areas of the world. The major winter crops are Wheat and Grams and summer crops are Jawar and Bajra.

== Specialties ==
- A big salt mine is situated in this village.
- There is a Grid Station (132 KW) in this village which provides electricity to the neighbouring areas.
- A petrol pump named "Sheen Ghar Petrol Station" is also situated in this village.
- There is also a big technical College offering a number of courses and diplomas.
- A Timber (wood) Mill is also situated in this village which provides articles of furniture to the people of this region.
- Gull Raees Sweets House which is famous for its sweets in the whole region is also located in this village.
