= Surizai Bala =

Village in Pakistan

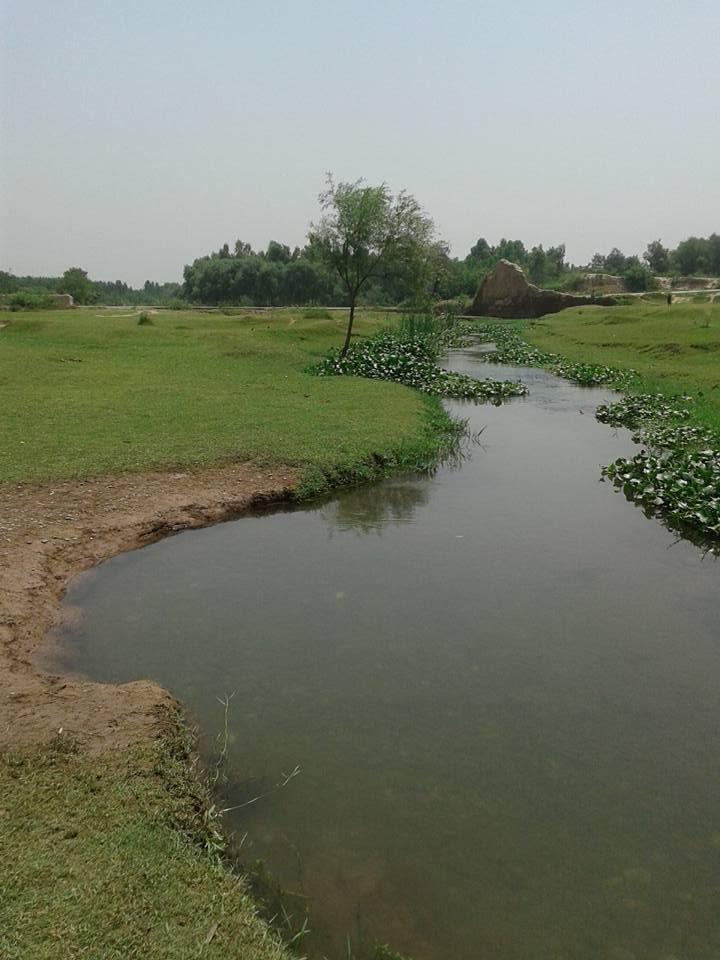

Surizai Bala is a village and Union Council in Peshawar District of Khyber Pakhtunkhwa, Pakistan. It is part of Badhber Tehsil which is an administrative subdivison of the district. The Pashtuns of this village speak the Pashto language and practice Pashtunwali, a traditional code of conduct and honour.
