= Mianki Banda =

Coordinates: 32°56′0″N 71°1′0″E

- Town and union council
- Interactive map of Mianki Banda
- Country: Pakistan
- Province: Khyber Pakhtunkhwa
- District: Karak District
- Time zone: UTC+5 (PST)

Mianki Banda is a town and union council of Karak District in Khyber Pakhtunkhwa province of Pakistan. It is located at 32°55'60N 71°1'0E at an altitude of 447 metres (1469 feet) and forms a part of Takht-e-Nasrati Tehsil.
