= Ahad Koruna =

- Location within Pakistan
- Coordinates: 34.39°N 71.25°E
- Country: Pakistan
- Province: Khyber Pakhtunkhwa
- Elevation: 843 m (2,766 ft)
- Time zone: UTC+5 (PST)
  - Summer (DST): UTC+6 (PDT)

Ahad Koruna is a town in the Khyber Pakhtunkhwa province of Pakistan. It is located at 34°23'13N 71°15'5E with an altitude of 843 metres (2769 feet).
