= Sikandar Khel Bala =

Pakistani town and administrative area

Sikandar Khel Bala سکندر خیل
- Town and Union Council
- Location in Pakistan Sikandar Khel Bala (Pakistan)
- Coordinates: 33°00′54″N 70°39′24″E
- Country: Pakistan
- Province: Khyber Pakhtunkhwa
- District: Bannu
- Time zone: UTC+5 (PST)
- Area code: Calling code

Sikandar Khel Bala is a town and union council in Bannu District of Khyber-Pakhtunkhwa, Pakistan.
