= Insanabad =

- Location within Pakistan
- Coordinates: 34.5°N 72.3°E
- Country: Pakistan
- Province: Khyber Pakhtunkhwa
- Elevation: 288 m (945 ft)
- Time zone: UTC+5 (PST)

Insanabad is a village of Mardan District in the Khyber Pakhtunkhwa province of Pakistan. It is located at 34°5'55N 72°3'50E with an altitude of 288 metres (948 feet).
