= Majuhan =

Coordinates: 34°12′30″N 73°29′0″E

Majuhan is a village in Abbottabad District of Khyber-Pakhtunkhwa province of Pakistan. Until the local government reforms of 2000 it was a Union Council, an administrative subdivision of the district, currently it is part of Nambal Union Council.

== Location ==
Marjuan is located in west of Abbottabad District, and lies near to the borders of Kashmir.
