= Nawe Kele =

Village in Pakistan

Nawe Kele is a village located in District Swat Valley, Union Council Kota, Tehsil Barikot, Pakistan. The population of the village is approximately 2500.
