= Charguli =

Coordinates: 34°19′0″N 72°14′0″E

Charguli Chargulay
- Town and union council
- Interactive map of Charguli
- Country: Pakistan
- Province: Khyber-Pakhtunkhwa
- District: Mardan District
- Tehsil: Mardan
- Police Station: Rustam

Government
  - Type: Union Council

Population (2010)
  - Total: 100,515
- Time zone: UTC+5 (PST)
- Pakistan Post Code: 23371
- Area code: 0937

Charguli is a town and union council in Mardan District of Khyber-Pakhtunkhwa. It has one Basic Health Unit, Government Primary, Middle & Higher Secondary School for Girls & Boys. There are 4 private schools. One Govt. Technical & Vocational Center is recently shifted here offering various kind of technical courses.

A small canal is used for irrigation and 90% of the area is under irrigation. This canal is linked with Lwe nehr (Large or main canal) of Swat to Swabi. Sugarcane, tobacco & wheat are the most commonly grown crops in this area. It is located at 34°19'0N 72°14'0E and has an altitude of 342 metres (1125 feet).

== Education ==
In education, Charguli has recently moved forward with the establishment of private sector schools and colleges such as Iqra Model School Charguli, Dar-e-Arqam School System Charguli, and The Government High Schools for boys and Girls are well established and many well known social contributors have been educated in these schools. There is also a Govt degree college for boys in the sub-council (village council) Khairabad. It was established in 1970 and is one of the oldest education institute in district Mardan.
