= Lodi Khel =

Town in Khyber Pakhtunkhwa, Pakistan

Coordinates: 33°35′N 71°10′E

Lodi Khel لودی خیل is a small Town located in Khyber-Pakhtunkhwa province of Pakistan.

It is a Shia dominated area and the main Pashtun tribe living there is Bangash. Its total population is almost 5000 and houses are almost 1500 these people are very brave and courageous.

Post Address - Village And Post Office Lodi Khel District And Tehsil Hangu

Postal Code - 26196

== Coordinates and location type ==
Area Type: Populated place
Location Type: Populated Place
Latitude: 33.58972
Longitude: 71.16972
Latitude (DMS): 33° 35' 23 N
Longitude (DMS): 71° 10' 11 E
