= Shahtut =

- Location within Pakistan
- Coordinates: 34.54°N 72.39°E
- Country: Pakistan
- Province: Khyber Pakhtunkhwa
- Elevation: 1,471 m (4,826 ft)
- Time zone: UTC+5 (PST)

Shahtut a town of Shangla District in Khyber Pakhtunkhwa province of Pakistan. It is located at 34°54′0″N 72°39′0″E and has an average elevation of 1471 metres 4829 feet).
