= Ghunda Karkana =

Coordinates: 34°9′45″N 71°48′56″E

- Town and union council
- Interactive map of Ghunda Karkana
- Country: Pakistan
- Province: Khyber-Pakhtunkhwa
- District: Charsadda District
- Time zone: UTC+5 (PST)

Ghunda Karkana is a town and union council in Charsadda District of Khyber-Pakhtunkhwa. It is located at 34°9'45N 71°48'56E and has an altitude of 287 metres (944 feet).
