= Mari, Abbottabad =

Mari
- Village
- Location within Pakistan
- Coordinates: 33.57°N 73.18°E
- Country: Pakistan
- Province: Khyber Pakhtunkhwa
- District: Abbottabad
- Elevation: 1,341 m (4,400 ft)
- Time zone: UTC+5 (PST)

Mari is a village in the Abbottabad District in Khyber Pakhtunkhwa province of Pakistan. It is located at 33°57'0N 73°18'0E with an altitude of 1341 metres (4402 feet).
