= Chowkara =

Coordinates: 33°1′50″N 71°1′52″E

- Town and union council
- Interactive map of Chowkara
- Country: Pakistan
- Province: Khyber Pakhtunkhwa
- District: Karak District
- Time zone: UTC+5 (PST)

Chowkara or Chukara is a town and union council of Karak District in Khyber Pakhtunkhwa province of Pakistan. It is located at 33°1'50N 71°1'52E at an altitude of 469 metres (1541 feet) and forms a part of Takht-e-Nasarati Tehsil.
