= Saro Shah =

Coordinates: 34°14′9″N 71°54′30″E

- Town and union council
- Interactive map of Saro Shah
- Country: Pakistan
- Province: Khyber-Pakhtunkhwa
- District: Mardan

Population
  - Total: Around 40 thousands
- Time zone: UTC+5 (PST)

Saro Shah or Saro is a town and union council in the Mardan District of Khyber-Pakhtunkhwa. The name of this town is derived from a bird known as sare. Saro Shah is about 5 km from Takht Bhai (or Takht Bahi) which is a Buddhist monastic complex dating to the 1st century BCE. The ruins are located about 15 kilometers from Mardan in Pakistan. It is located at 34°14'9N 71°54'30E and has an altitude of 316 metres (1040 feet).
