= Mian Kalay Shangla =

Mian Kalay (میاں کلے ) Mian Kalay
- Village/Town
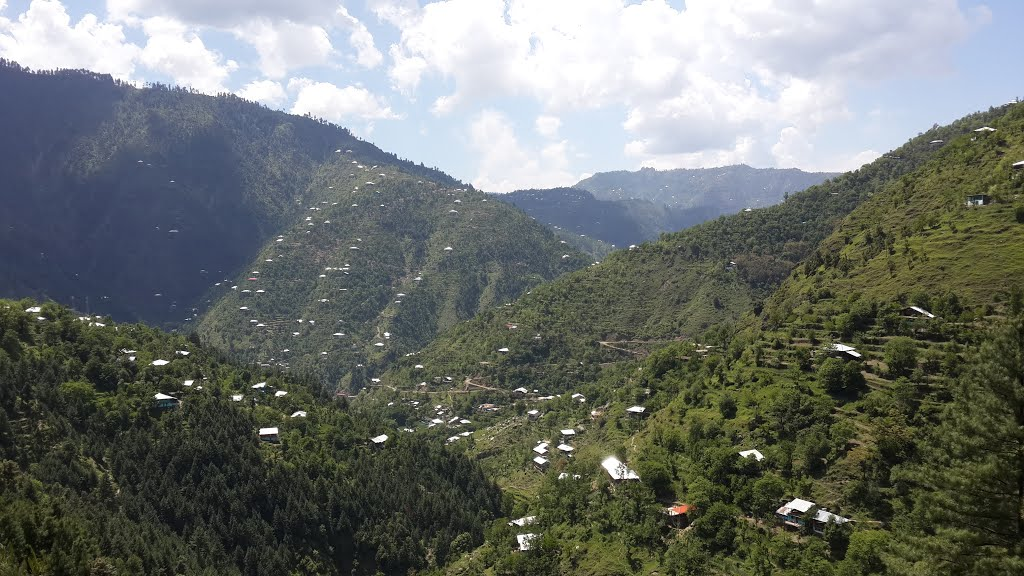

- Location within Pakistan
- Coordinates: 34°54′N 72°41′E
- Country: Pakistan
- Province: Khyber-Pakhtunkhwa
- District: Shangla District
- Tehsil: Tehsil Alpurai
- Union Council: Pirabad Union Council

Mian Kalay (میاں کلے) is a town of Tehsil Alpurai in Shangla District of Khyber-Pakhtunkhwa province of Pakistan. It is the main village of Pirabd Union Council of Tehsil Alpurai and a commercial place for the business community. Mian Kalay is a town of the Pirabad Union Council (U.C) of Tehsil Alpurai, located at 34°54'15N 72°41'45E and lies in the area affected by the 2005 earthquake and 2010 Flood.
