= Gandiali Bala =

Human settlement in Pakistan

Coordinates: 33°32′N 71°37′E

Gandiali Bala is a town in Kohat District in Khyber Pakhtunkhwa province of Pakistan. It is located to the north of Kohat city, the Gandiali dam is located in this town.
