= Koz Behram Dheri =

- Town and union council
- Country: Pakistan
- Province: Khyber-Pakhtunkhwa
- District: Charsadda District
- Time zone: UTC+5 (PST)

Koz Behram Dheri is a town and union council in Charsadda District of Khyber-Pakhtunkhwa.
