= Tajwal Tarli =

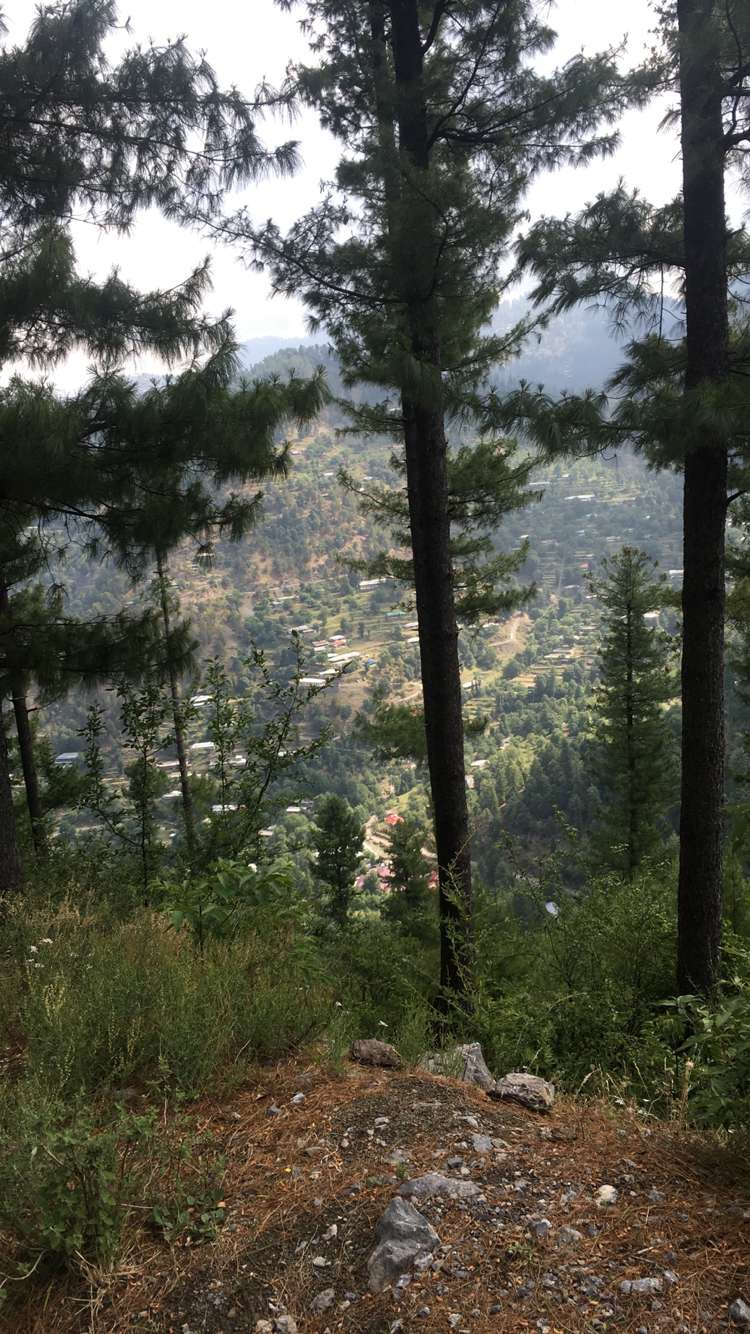

- Location within Pakistan
- Coordinates: 34.01°N 73.20°E
- Country: Pakistan
- Province: Khyber Pakhtunkhwa
- Elevation: 1,563 m (5,128 ft)
- Time zone: UTC+5 (PST)

Tajwal Tarli is a village in Khyber Pakhtunkhwa province of Pakistan. It is located at 34°1'0N 73°20'30E with an altitude of 1563 metres (5131 feet).
