= Gurakki =

- Location within Pakistan
- Coordinates: 34.6°N 72.59°E
- Country: Pakistan
- Province: Khyber-Pakhtunkhwa
- Elevation: 847 m (2,779 ft)
- Time zone: UTC+5 (PST)

Gurakki, also spelt Gorakki, is a village of Haripur District in Khyber-Pakhtunkhwa province of Pakistan. It is part of Kachhi Village Council and is located at 34°6'0N 72°59'0E at an altitude of 847 metres (2782 feet). The village is at the top of the hills and is connected by a metaled road with Haripur and Kakotri. Most of the population has relocated to urban areas.
