= Teer (Pind Hasham Khan) =

Pakistani village

- Town
- Interactive map of Teer
- Coordinates: 34°5.211′0″N 73°0.487′0″E
- Country: Pakistan
- Region: Khyber Pakhtunkhwa
- District: Haripur District

Government
  - Nazim: Malik Mazhar
- Time zone: UTC+5 (PST)
- Postal code: 22721

Teer (Urdu: تیر) is a village of Haripur District, Khyber Pakhtunkhwa, Pakistan.

== Population ==
According to the 1998 census, the population of the village is about 2,980, including 1,448 males and 1,532 females. The literacy rate is about 46.8%.

== Language ==
Hindko is the native language of all the residents of the town.
