= Wazira =

- In Arabic: وزيرة
- Meaning: A Female Minister
- Role: A female politician who holds significant public office in a national or regional government, making and implementing decisions on policies.

Wazira
- Location within Pakistan
- Coordinates: 34.03°N 73.08°E
- Country: Pakistan
- Province: Khyber-Pakhtunkhwa
- Elevation: 759 m (2,490 ft)
- Time zone: UTC+5 (PST)

Wazira (Arabic: وزيرة) is a high-ranking female official title that means Minister of a Muslim or Arab regime. During the Abbasid Caliphate, Wazir (وزير) which represents the title of a male Minister was used for the first time. In the modern age, and due to equitable participation of women in politics and government, the Wazira title have become commonly used in many countries within the MENA region, Brunei and the Indian subcontinent.

Nowadays, a Wazira fully acts as a politician who holds significant public office in a national or regional government, making and implementing decisions on policies alongside and equally to other male ministers who carry a title of a Wazir.

Wazira is also a name of a village in Khyber-Pakhtunkhwa province of Pakistan. It is located at 34°3'0N 73°7'0E with an altitude of 759 metres (2493 feet).
