= Mahra, Khyber Pakhtunkhwa =

Coordinates: 31°30′0″N 70°45′0″E

Mahra, Khyber-Pakhtunkhwa
- Town and union council
- Interactive map of Mahra, Khyber-Pakhtunkhwa
- Country: Pakistan
- Province: Khyber-Pakhtunkhwa
- District: Dera Ismail Khan District
- Time zone: UTC+5 (PST)

Mahra is a town and union council in Dera Ismail Khan District of Khyber-Pakhtunkhwa. It is located at 31°30'0N 70°45'0E and has an altitude of 154 metres (508 feet).
