= Daruni Maira =

- Location within Pakistan
- Coordinates: 34.03°N 73.07°E
- Country: Pakistan
- Province: Khyber Pakhtunkhwa
- Elevation: 759 m (2,490 ft)
- Time zone: UTC+5 (PST)

Daruni Maira is a village in the Khyber Pakhtunkhwa province of Pakistan. It is located at 34°3'0N 73°7'0E with an altitude of 759 metres (2493 feet).
