= Hindki, Khyber Pakhtunkhwa =

Hindki
- Location within Pakistan
- Coordinates: 32.59°N 70.34°E
- Country: Pakistan
- Province: Khyber Pakhtunkhwa
- Elevation: 362 m (1,188 ft)
- Time zone: UTC+5 (PST)

Hindki is a village in the Khyber Pakhtunkhwa province of Pakistan. It is located at 32°59'26N 70°34'23E with an altitude of 362 metres (1190 feet) above sea level.
