= Hathala =

Coordinates: 32°2′56″N 70°34′18″E

- Town and union council
- Interactive map of Hathala
- Country: Pakistan
- Province: Khyber-Pakhtunkhwa
- District: Dera Ismail Khan District
- Time zone: UTC+5 (PST)

Hathala is a town and union council in Kulachi tehsil, Dera Ismail Khan District of Khyber-Pakhtunkhwa. It is located at 32°2'56N 70°34'18E and has an altitude of 208 metres (685 feet).
