= Hamsherian =

Humsherian
- Village and union council
- Country: Pakistan
- Region: Khyber Pakhtunkhwa
- District: Mansehra District
- Time zone: UTC+5 (PST)

Humsherian is a small village and union council (an administrative subdivision) of Mansehra District in the Khyber Pakhtunkhwa province of Pakistan. It lies just south of Bherkund and north west of the district capital Mansehra in an area affected by the 2005 Kashmir earthquake.
