= Looni =

- Town and union council
- Country: Pakistan
- Province: Khyber-Pakhtunkhwa
- District: Dera Ismail Khan District
- Tehsil: Kulachi

Government
  - Sardar: Sardar Inayat Ullah khan Gandapoor
- Time zone: UTC+5 (PST)
- Postal code: 29350
- Area code: 0966

Looni is a town and union council in Kulachi Tehsil Dera Ismail Khan District of Khyber-Pakhtunkhwa.
