= Muhammad Khel =

Coordinates: 32°59′0″N 70°32′0″E

Daud Shah
- Town and union council
- Interactive map of Daud Shah
- Country: Pakistan
- Province: Khyber-Pakhtunkhwa
- District: Bannu District
- Time zone: UTC+5 (PST)

Muhammad Khel is a town and union council in Bannu District of Khyber-Pakhtunkhwa. It is located at 32°58'60N 70°31'60E and has an altitude of 369 metres (1213 feet).
