= Chitta Batta =

Coordinates: 34°22′N 73°15′E

Chitta Batta is a small village with around 5,000 inhabitants located in the Khyber-Pakhtunkhwa province of Pakistan. Its coordinates are 34°21'59.99"N 73°14'60.00"E. It lies along the N-15 highway and is approximately 9 kilometres from Mansehra.
