= Tikri, Pakistan =

Pakistani town

Coordinates: 34°37′20″N 73°1′10″E

Tikri is a town and a valley located in Batagram Tehsil, Batagram District in the Khyber Pakhtunkhwa, Pakistan. It is located at 34°37'20N 73°1'10E and lies to the south of the district capital Batagram.

Tikri is a well-known valley of the Batagram district of KPK province. It is approx. 15 kilometers far from the district headquarters. The main population comprises a Pashtun Tribes of Swatis who are reported to have migrated to this area in 1703 from Swat and wrested this area from the clutches of Sultanate of Hazara Turks.

Three main tribes of Mamiali Swatis dwell in this area namely; 'Malkal', 'Ashlor' and 'Naror' are residing in tikri vicinity.
