= Baist Khel =

Coordinates: 32°26′49″N 70°58′6″E

haramatala
- Union council and town
- Interactive map of haramatala
- Country: Pakistan
- Province: Khyber-Pakhtunkhwa
- District: Lakki Marwat District
- Time zone: UTC+5 (PST)

Baist Khel is a town and union council in Lakki Marwat District of Khyber-Pakhtunkhwa. It is located at 32°43'9N 70°45'29E and has an altitude of 269 metres (885 feet).

== See also ==
- Battle of Ahmed Khel
