= Masha Mansoor =

- Union council and town
- Interactive map of Masha Mansoor
- Coordinates: 32°26′51″N 70°47′27″E
- Country: Pakistan
- Province: Khyber-Pakhtunkhwa
- District: Lakki Marwat District
- Elevation: 351 m (1,152 ft)
- Time zone: UTC+5 (PST)

Masha Mansoor is a town and a union council in the Lakki Marwat District of Khyber-Pakhtunkhwa. Masha and Mansoor are two separate villages. Masha belongs to Malak Masha (the Khan or head of the Malaks).

== Leadership ==
Malak Zain Ul Abedin Khan Marwat has been the political leader since 1997. He is a transportation tycoon and the first son of Malak Bahauddin Khan Marwat. Malak Siraj Uddin Khan Marwat is his grandfather.

His son Malik Imran Khanalso plays a role in the politics of Lakki Marwat. He was a Member of Khyber-Pakhtunkhwa Parliament in 2002 and served as a Member of Standing Committee No. 18 on the Local Government Election and Rural Development Department, and a Member of Standing Committee No. 08 on Higher Education, Archives, and Libraries. His elder brother Malik Noor Saleem Khan graduated from Boston University in Massachusetts, United States. He is a current Member of Parliament in 2013, Party Affiliation Jamiat Ulema-e-Islam (F), Malakano Kor, Marwat State.
