= Nurar =

Coordinates: 32°54′9″N 70°32′32″E

- Town and union council
- Interactive map of Nurar
- Country: Pakistan
- Province: Khyber-Pakhtunkhwa
- District: Bannu District
- Time zone: UTC+5 (PST)

Nurar is a town and union council in Bannu District of Khyber-Pakhtunkhwa. It is located at 32°54'9N 70°32'3E and has an altitude of 345 metres (1135 feet).
