= Gurguri =

Village in Karak District, Pakistan

Coordinates: 33°17′54″N 70°47′11″E

Gurguri is a village and Union Council of Karak District in Khyber Pakhtunkhwa province of Pakistan. It is located at 33°17'54N 70°47'11E with an altitude of 902 metres (2962 feet).
