= Malla, Pakistan =

Malla
- Location within Pakistan
- Coordinates: 34.03°N 73.04°E
- Country: Pakistan
- Province: Khyber Pakhtunkhwa
- Elevation: 875 m (2,871 ft)
- Time zone: UTC+5 (PST)

Malla is a village in Abbottabad District of Khyber Pakhtunkhwa province of Pakistan. It is located at an altitude of 875 metres (2871 feet). Malla is a hilly area in the northern part of Pakistan.

== Climate ==
Malla has a humid subtropical climate (Cwa)

Climate data for Malla, Pakistan
Month	Jan	Feb	Mar	Apr	May	Jun	Jul	Aug	Sep	Oct	Nov	Dec	Year
Mean daily maximum °C (°F)	16.4 (61.5)	18.4 (65.1)	24 (75)	30.6 (87.1)	36.5 (97.7)	37.9 (100.2)	33.8 (92.8)	32.2 (90.0)	31.3 (88.3)	28.8 (83.8)	23.2 (73.8)	18.7 (65.7)	27.7 (81.9)
Daily mean °C (°F)	10.9 (51.6)	13.1 (55.6)	18.6 (65.5)	24.8 (76.6)	30.7 (87.3)	32.9 (91.2)	30.3 (86.5)	28.9 (84.0)	27.4 (81.3)	23.5 (74.3)	17.4 (63.3)	12.6 (54.7)	22.6 (72.7)
Mean daily minimum °C (°F)	5.1 (41.2)	7.3 (45.1)	12.2 (54.0)	17.6 (63.7)	23.1 (73.6)	26.8 (80.2)	26.3 (79.3)	25.2 (77.4)	23.1 (73.6)	17.8 (64.0)	11.6 (52.9)	6.6 (43.9)	16.9 (62.4)
Average precipitation mm (inches)	26 (1.0)	56 (2.2)	67 (2.6)	57 (2.2)	31 (1.2)	70 (2.8)	241 (9.5)	202 (8.0)	79 (3.1)	33 (1.3)	17 (0.7)	16 (0.6)	895 (35.2)
Average precipitation days (≥ 0.01 mm)	3	5	7	6	5	7	15	15	8	3	2	2	78
Average relative humidity (%)	60	59	54	40	29	37	67	75	67	56	56	56	55
Mean daily daylight hours	8.4	8.6	9.9	11.3	12.4	12.3	9.7	9.0	10.0	10.0	9.1	8.7	10.0
