= Asperka Waziran =

- Town and union council
- Country: Pakistan
- Province: Khyber-Pakhtunkhwa
- District: Bannu District
- Time zone: UTC+5 (PST)

Asperka Waziran is a town and union council in the Bannu District of Khyber-Pakhtunkhwa.
