= Hathian =

Coordinates: 34°23′35″N 71°55′0″E

- Village and union council
- Interactive map of Hathian
- Country: Pakistan
- Province: Khyber Pakhtunkhwa
- District: Mardan District
- Time zone: UTC+5 (PST)

Hathian is a village and union council in Mardan District of Khyber Pakhtunkhwa. It is located at 34°23'35N 71°55'0E and has an altitude of 372m (1223 feet).
