= Lond =

- Location within Pakistan
- Coordinates: 34.51°N 73.10°E
- Country: Pakistan
- Province: Khyber Pakhtunkhwa
- Elevation: 2,625 m (8,612 ft)
- Time zone: UTC+05:00 (PST)

Lond is a town in Khyber Pakhtunkhwa province of Pakistan. It is located at 34°51'0N 72°10'0E with an altitude of 2625 metres (8615 feet).
