= Kupri Amazai =

Village in Khyber Pakhtunkhwa, Pakistan

Coordinates: 34°20′19″N 72°46′2″E

Amazai is a village in the Khyber Pakhtunkhwa province of Pakistan. This village was founded by migrants from Amazo Gharai Mardan (near Sawabi) in 1718. It got its name from its proximity to a large stone which looked like a human skull.. In Pashto, a human skull is called a Kooprai which was corrupted to Kupri over the years. The father (Baba) of this village migrated from District Mardan and his name was Ahmed Baba. The main tribes in Amazai are Yousafzai, Tanoli, Mughals and Gujjars. The population is approximately 3500 and the predominant occupations are in agriculture.

There are two mosques (Sunni Islam) and a Hujra in Kupri. People come to Hujra and sit together and discuss their issues. The upper mosque is in the upper part of the village and the lower mosque in the lower. There is also a high school and three primary schools.

There are six sub-tribes in Kupri Amazai. The largest is Khair Muhammad Khel, also called Ganra Khoona. The second largest is Umbaras Khail. These sub-tribes have been further divided into sub-casts. The sub-casts of Khair Muhmmad Khel are Zaman Khel, Musa Khal. Zaman Khel were once very well known for their bravery. Some other tribe like zareeb khel also known as Shamkur because their blind love for meat, its not necessary for every zareeb khel because just like most tribes made just to remember ancestors and give an identity to a group of similar people also Each tribe have some prominent persons who sit together at Hujra to discuss the issues and define policies for the village. Everyone in the village have to follow these policies. Any person who deviates from these local policies are charged fine called Nagha in local language. Policies are prepared verbally and everybody keep remember these rules.

Before starting with the history of amazai tribes like amazai, tanoli and gujjar we should know everyone is a migrant from somewhere and everyone is unique similarly pashtun may have tribes and sub-tribes but these are just to remember ancestry they aren't different from each other, so to begin with amazai tribe which is a subtribe of mandanar is like a brotherly tribe of yousafzai and is part of the khashi tribe, This kashi is again brotherly tribe of ghorya khel, Both kashi khel and ghoria are known as kharshbun tribe of pashtun, this kharshbun is also known as bar abdalian (upper abdali's) because this is again a brotherly tribe of abodali tribe of pashtun which is residing in kandahar Afghanistan and combined these all tribes are known as Sarabani tribe of pashtun and pashtun itself is an (Eastern iranian) tribe.

Sarabani was originated in kandahar and migrated to kabul after the loss of now known as upper abdali's in a battle They further migrated to peshawar and swat valley, they fought a battle with already residing afghan tribe named dilazakh which they won this event was happening during ullug beg mughal sultanat era Mandnar migrated further east into mardan and adjoint areas and one of it subtribe (amazai) ended up in Kuprai Amazai which is now part of haripur hazara

Similarly tanolis (dilazakh) is another pashtun tribe migrated from swat and peshawar to tanowal area in hazara and become tanolis but many of them are confused with gujjar which is another inhabitant of kuprai amazai because they have adopted hindko which is a variant of pahari and punjabi language

Gujjar are considered to be migrants from azad kashmir regions to hazara and amazai

The Amazo garhi is now very populated and converted to Tehsil, the Village is mainly divided into 2 parts one is called Kot, and second is called garhai.the kot is further divided into 2 parts one is called kot doulatzai and second is called kot ismailzai while the garhai is also divided into 2 parts one is called garhi doulatzai and garhi ismailzai, there is small part of river which is called "Muqam nala" in documents, but the locals of kot call it garhai pul(bridge) and the people of garhai call it kot pul means kot bridge.

Tha most famous mohalla of kot doulatzai is Mohalla Awanan which is famous for their bravery, and there is a famous bus stop there near mohalla called sheikh inayat baba stop.

All villagers are very cooperative with each other in social works. Whenever any dispute arises between two persons, some respectable people resolve their conflicts through jirga. Jirga is the most common ethic of Pathans in which many disputes are resolved without any police or government intervention.
