= Muhammad Khawja =

Coordinates: 33°26′20″N 70°54′34″E

- Town and union council
- Interactive map of Muhammad Khawja
- Country: Pakistan
- Province: Khyber Pakhtunkhwa
- District: Hangu District
- Time zone: UTC+5 (PST)

Muhammad Khawja is a Bangash town and union council of Hangu District in Khyber Pakhtunkhwa province of Pakistan. It is located at 33°26'20N 70°54'34E and has an altitude of 928 metres (3047 feet).
