= Muqeem Shah =

Coordinates: 29°59′34″N 73°15′13″E

Muqeem Shah, Punjab
- Town and union council
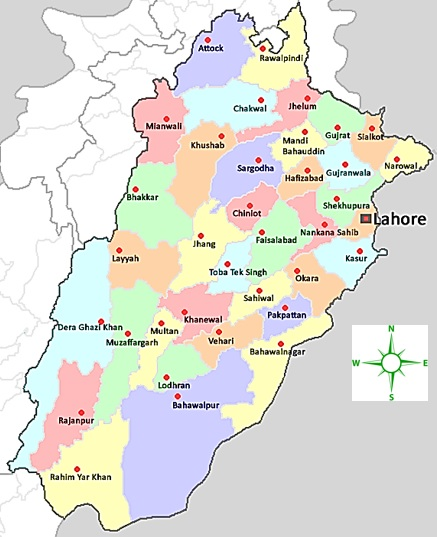
- Country: Pakistan
- Province: Punjab
- District: Bahawalnagar District
- Time zone: UTC+5 (PST)
  - Summer (DST): +6

Muqeem Shah (( مقیم شاہ or Muqeem Shah, Punjab is a town a in the Bahawalnagar District of the Punjab province in Pakistan.

== Geography ==
The town is situated in south of District Bahawalnagar, at a distance of 25 km across Chak Abdullah road, the town has a link road from Chak Abdullah at place named Muqeem Shah. The town comes in Union Council Punjab. The neighbourhood villages are Kot, Said Ali, Tobha. The town Muqeem Shah is located at centre of the cited Union Council. .

== Name ==
The town is named after Syed Peer Muqeem Shah, who is buried here.

== History ==
There are no reliable sources for the complete history, about the foundation of this town. However some clues show that the town is very old. Some graves within the town's graveyard are at least two to three hundred years old. The data about Syed Peer Muqeem Shah is potentially unreliable, there are only unreliablely sourced folklores

== Descendants ==
These are the Descendants of Syed Muqeem Shah.

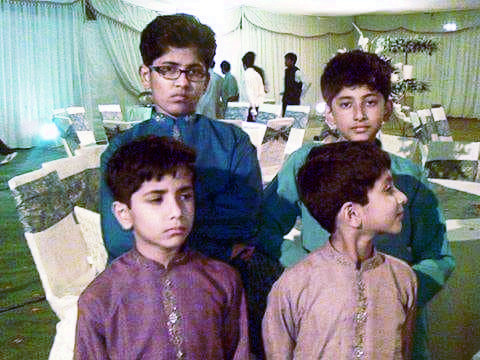
Syed Fazal Mehmood Son's

== Population ==
The population of the town is of about 15 houses. The population is now increasing because being a peace full place people are migrating here day by day.

== Laguanges ==
The majority of the inhabitants are Punjabi speakers.

== Professions ==
The villagers profession is agriculture i.e. they are cultivators and they work on daily wages in different fields (labour). A few people have government jobs in police, army and education departments.

== Schools and education ==
The town has a primary school, a middle school for boys and a primary school for girls. The education rate is very low. Therefore, an educational environment needs to be developed in the town.

== Castes ==
Sayyids. This city is named after the person who claim descent from the Syed caste.

== Notable Persons ==
The following personalities belong to the town:

- Syed Muqeem Shah, Sufi
- Syed Gulsher Shah, Sufi

== Religion ==
The town's inhabitants are now mainly Muslim, followers of Sunni Sect. They respect all other sects. They never support any type sectarianism.

== Crops ==
Wheat, rice, sugarcane, gram, barley, maze, great-millet, oat, millet, buck-wheat, paddy, mustard, field pea, sugar beat, tomatoes, mint, onion are the popular crops cultivated here.
