= Nala, Pakistan =

Nala
- Location within Pakistan
- Coordinates: 34.11°N 73.26°E
- Country: Pakistan
- Province: Khyber Pakhtunkhwa
- Elevation: 1,694 m (5,558 ft)
- Time zone: UTC+5 (PST)

Nala is a village in the Khyber Pakhtunkhwa Province of Pakistan. It is located at 34°11'5"N 73°26'20"E with an altitude of 1694 metres (5561 feet).
