= Laki Ghundaki =

Coordinates: 33°09′N 71°09′E

Karak - Laki Ghundaki

Laki Ghundaki is a village in Karak District in Khyber Pakhtunkhwa province of Pakistan. Laki Ghundak is located amidst Karak City and the populous town of Mitha Khel. It is 5 km from Karak city.

Latitude 33 08' 32" Longitude 70 09' 28"
