= Siraj Khel =

Pakistani village

Coordinates: 33°1′14″N 71°7′3″E

- Village and union council
- Interactive map of Siraj Khel
- Country: Pakistan
- Province: Khyber Pakhtunkhwa
- District: Karak District
- Time zone: UTC+5 (PST)

Siraj Khel, also known as Saraj Khel, is a village and Union Council in the Karak District of Khyber Pakhtunkhwa, Pakistan. Named after Siraj Baba, the village is situated at 33°1'14"N and 71°7'3"E, with an elevation of 710 meters (2,332 feet).
