= Khojari =

- Town and union council
- Country: Pakistan
- Province: Khyber Pakhtunkhwa
- District: Bannu District
- Time zone: UTC+5 (PST)

Khojari is a town and union council in Bannu District of Khyber Pakhtunkhwa.

Its geographical location is 32.9253° N, 70.6752° E
