= Shodag =

Pakistani administrative area

- Town and union council
- Country: Pakistan
- Province: Khyber Pakhtunkhwa
- District: Charsadda District
- Time zone: UTC+5 (PST)
- Postal code: 24511

Shodag is a town and union council located in the Charsadda District of Pakistan's Khyber Pakhtunkhwa province. It lies to the northeast of Peshawar and the northwest of Mardan.
