= Malik Pur, Mansehra =

Malik Pur
- Village and union council
- Country: Pakistan
- Region: Khyber Pakhtunkhwa
- District: Mansehra District
- Time zone: UTC+5 (PST)

Malik Pur is a village and union council (an administrative subdivision) of Mansehra District in the Khyber Pakhtunkhwa province of Pakistan. It is located to the north east the district capital Mansehra.

Alisheri family of Swatis is the only landowning family of Malik Pur.
