= Miran, Khyber Pakhtunkhwa =

Coordinates: 31°24′0″N 70°43′0″E

Miran, Khyber-Pakhtunkhwa
- Town and union council
- Interactive map of Miran, Khyber-Pakhtunkhwa
- Country: Pakistan
- Province: Khyber-Pakhtunkhwa
- District: Dera Ismail Khan District
- Time zone: UTC+5 (PST)

Miran is a town and union council in Dera Ismail Khan District of Khyber-Pakhtunkhwa. It is located at 31°23'60N 70°43'0E and has an altitude of 148 metres (488 feet).
