= Gallai, Pakistan =

Village in Pakistan

Gallai is the largest village of the Mashwanis community in Sirikot, Haripur District in Khyber Pakhtunkhwa province of Pakistan.
