= Hajizai =

Coordinates: 34°6′50″N 71°28′36″E

- Town and union council
- Interactive map of Hajizai
- Country: Pakistan
- Province: Khyber-Pakhtunkhwa
- District: Charsadda District
- Time zone: UTC+5 (PST)

Hajizai is a town and union council in Charsadda District of Khyber-Pakhtunkhwa. It is located at 34°6'50N 71°28'36E and has an altitude of 311 metres (1023 feet).
