= Saeedabad, Khyber Pakhtunkhwa =

Village in Khyber-Pakhtunkhwa, Pakistan

Saeedabad
- Location within Pakistan
- Coordinates: 34.08°N 71.36°E
- Country: Pakistan
- Province: Khyber-Pakhtunkhwa
- Elevation: 283 m (928 ft)
- Time zone: UTC+5 (PST)

Saeedabad (Urdu: سعيد آباد) is a village in the Khyber-Pakhtunkhwa. It is located at 34°8'19N 71°36'24E with an altitude of 283 metres (931 feet).
