= Pandak, Pakistan =

Pandak village, Haripur, Khyber-Pakhtunkhwa province, Pakistan
- Village and union council
- Country: Pakistan
- Region: Khyber Pakhtunkhwa
- District: Haripur District
- Time zone: UTC+5 (PST)

Pandak is a village and one of the 44 union councils or administrative subdivisions of Haripur District in the Khyber Pakhtunkhwa province of Pakistan. Pandak is divided into two sections, or Mohallahs: Upper Pandak and Lower Pandak.
