= Khemdarra =

- Location within Pakistan
- Coordinates: 35.44°N 71.47°E
- Country: Pakistan
- Province: Khyber Pakhtunkhwa
- Elevation: 1,598 m (5,243 ft)
- Time zone: UTC+5 (PST)

Khemdarra is a village in the Khyber Pakhtunkhwa Province of Pakistan. It is located at 34°48'0N 72°15'0E with an altitude of 1047 metres (3438 feet). Neighbouring settlements include Kabbal and Dagai.
