= Mama Khel =

- Union council and town
- Location in Pakistan
- Coordinates: 32°51′1″N 70°46′51″E
- Country: Pakistan
- Province: Khyber-Pakhtunkhwa
- District: Lakki Marwat District
- Tehsil: Lakki Marwat
- Time zone: UTC+5 (PST)

Mama Khel is a town and union council in Lakki Marwat District of Khyber-Pakhtunkhwa. It is located at 32°51'1N 70°46'51E and has an altitude of 280 metres (921 feet).
