= Mandan, Bannu =

Coordinates: 32°56′46″N 70°36′29″E

Mandan
- Town and union council
- Interactive map of Mandan
- Country: Pakistan
- Province: Khyber Pakhtunkhwa
- District: Bannu District
- Time zone: UTC+5 (PST)

Mandan is a town and union council in Bannu District of Khyber Pakhtunkhwa. It is located at 32°56'46N 70°36'29E and has an altitude of 348 metres (1145 feet).
