= Hassan Zai =

Coordinates: 34°16′24″N 71°36′24″E

Hassan Zai Shabqadar
- Town and union council
- Interactive map of Hassan Zai Shabqadar
- Country: Pakistan
- Province: Khyber-Pakhtunkhwa
- District: Charsadda District
- Time zone: UTC+5 (PST)

Hassan Zai is a town and union council in Charsadda District of Khyber-Pakhtunkhwa. It is located at 34°16'24N 71°36'24E and has an altitude of 327 metres (1076 feet).
