= Mirzadher =

Coordinates: 34°15′21″N 71°39′22″E

- Town and union council
- Interactive map of Mirzadher
- Country: Pakistan
- Province: Khyber-Pakhtunkhwa
- District: Charsadda District
- Time zone: UTC+5 (PST)

Mirzadher is a town and union council in Charsadda District of Khyber-Pakhtunkhwa, Pakistan. It is located at 34°15'21N 71°39'22E and has an altitude of 316 metres (1040 feet).

Haji Muhabat Khan (L) was one of the most famous personalities of Mirzadher. He was elected as chairman of UC Mirzadher 3 times; two times by defeating Hayat Sikandar Khan Sherpao. Muhabat Khan was a nationalist and a very close friend to Bacha Khan.

Haji Salah Uddin (L) was another prominent figure and a great personality of Mirzadher. He was a landlord and was from one of the most respectable families of the district Charsadda. He was a close friend of Haji Muhabbat Khan. Haji Salah Uddin is the father and grandfather to many notable figures from Charsadda district.
