= Tupla, Pakistan =

Tupla
- Location within Pakistan
- Coordinates: 34.00°N 73.20°E
- Country: Pakistan
- Province: Khyber Pakhtunkhwa
- Elevation: 1,781 m (5,843 ft)
- Time zone: UTC+5 (PST)

Tupla is a village in the Abbottabad District of the Khyber Pakhtunkhwa province of Pakistan. It is located at 34°0'0N 73°20'0E with an altitude of 1781 metres (5846 feet).
