= Pashtun Hujra =

The Pashtun Hujra (Pashto: حجره) is a long-standing communal institution in Pashtuns societies in Afghanistan and Pakistan that serves as a multi-purpose social, cultural, political, and educational space. It is traditionally a gathering place for men, maintained collectively by villages or tribal communities, where guests are welcomed and cared for, elders and youth engage in dialogue, and the principles of Pashtunwali (the Pashtun code of conduct) are passed down from generation to generation.

Historically, Hujras have served as places for conflict resolution (jirgas), storytelling, music, poetry, religious and ritual ceremonies, communal events such as weddings and funerals, and everyday hospitality. While the origins of the hut are seen as ancient, some sources trace it back as far as 5,000 years in Pashtun-populated areas. Its role is now understood to be under pressure from urbanization, changing lifestyles, technology, and security concerns.

== Etymology and definition ==
Hujra (Pashto: حجره) literally means "chamber" or "room". The term "Hujra" is sometimes used as a synonym for a guest room or baithak, which is a reception room for guests. In the Pashtun cultural context, a hujra denotes a purpose-built communal structure (or room) where male members of a community gather for hospitality, discussion, social relations, and deliberation on leadership.

== Historical origins and evolution ==
The hujra is often considered to be as old as social institutions in Pashtun society, developing alongside or in conjunction with the tradition of the jirga (tribal council). Some sources trace the role of the hujra to the old Pashtun custom of melmsatiya (hospitality) as part of the Pashtun moral code: providing shelter, care, and respect to guests. Over time, regional, economic, architectural, and social changes have altered the form, use, and distribution of hujras.

== Functions and roles ==
=== Social and cultural center ===
The Hujra serves as a local gathering place for men to meet, interact, and build community relationships. It is a place for storytelling, traditional music, poetry recitation, and the preservation of oral culture. It can host ceremonies, funerals, weddings, and communal meals.

=== Guest reception ===
According to the Pashtun value of melmsatiya (unconditional hospitality), the primary role is to receive, host, and provide for guests, travelers, or visitors. A guest visiting a hujra is expected to be fed and sheltered before making any further demands.

=== Jirga venue ===
The hujra often hosts discussions, conflict resolution, and thoughtful gatherings similar to a jirga. Community elders may meet to discuss communal matters, politics, land issues, or social problems.

=== Knowledge exchange ===
The Hujra serves as an informal learning ground: elders impart wisdom, local knowledge, religious instruction, and life skills to younger generations. It helps preserve and spread local knowledge, folk traditions, and local discourse on social issues.

== Architectural aspects ==
The physical form of a hujra may vary depending on the region, availability of local materials, climate, and social status. The typical design includes a seating area, often open or semi-open, with benches or Charpai (woven beds), and sometimes a raised platform or veranda. In some villages, the hujra may be part of a larger house or compound. In others, it is a stand-alone communal structure. Some hujra include small storerooms, guest rooms, or adjoining spaces for serving meals, private conversation, or overnight stays.

== See also ==
- Pashtun culture
