= Zaim, Khyber Pakhtunkhwa =

Coordinates: 34°18′N 71°44′E

Zaim, Khyber-Pakhtunkhwa
- Town and union council
- Interactive map of Zaim, Khyber-Pakhtunkhwa
- Country: Pakistan
- Province: Khyber-Pakhtunkhwa
- District: Charsadda District
- Time zone: UTC+5 (PST)

Zaim is a town and union council in Charsadda District of Khyber-Pakhtunkhwa.
