= Ghamjaba =

- Location within Pakistan
- Coordinates: 34.48°N 72.17°E
- Country: Pakistan
- Province: Khyber-Pakhtunkhwa
- District: Swat
- Elevation: 880 m (2,890 ft)
- Time zone: UTC+5 (PST)

Ghamjaba is a village in the Swat District of Khyber Pakhtunkhwa, Pakistan.
