= Sangara, Pakistan =

Sangara
- سنگارا
- Location within Pakistan
- Coordinates: 34.01°N 73.13°E
- Country: Pakistan
- Province: Khyber Pakhtunkhwa
- Elevation: 1,316 m (4,318 ft)
- Time zone: UTC+5 (PST)

Sangara is a village in the Khyber Pakhtunkhwa Province of Pakistan. It is located at 34°1'20N 73°13'30E with an altitude of 1316 metres (4320 feet).
