= Harichand =

Coordinates: 34°23′2″N 71°48′18″E

Harichand Archan quaid abad
- Town and union council
- Interactive map of Harichand
- Country: Pakistan
- Province: Khyber-Pakhtunkhwa
- District: Charsadda District

Government
  - Type: Union council Nazim
- Time zone: UTC+5 (PST)

Harichand is a town and union council in the Charsadda District of Khyber-Pakhtunkhwa. It is located at 34°23'2"N 71°48'18"E and has an altitude of 381 meters (1253 feet).

A historical location called Harichand has the name of Harichand Singh, a wealthy businessman renowned for his hospitality. The town has a distinctive past since residents think it was crucial to India's independence from British domination. Mahatma Gandhi once traveled to Upper Dir to meet with the Nawab of Dir, along with a few other Congress members. They were attacked by several individuals in Shergarh on the way back, so they decided to take a different path and traveled to Harichand via Dargai canal. Before going to Utmanzai Bacha Khan House, nowadays known as Wali Bagh, they stayed at Harichand Singh's home.
