= Shabqadar =

Pakistani town

Shabqadar شبقدر (Pashto)
- City
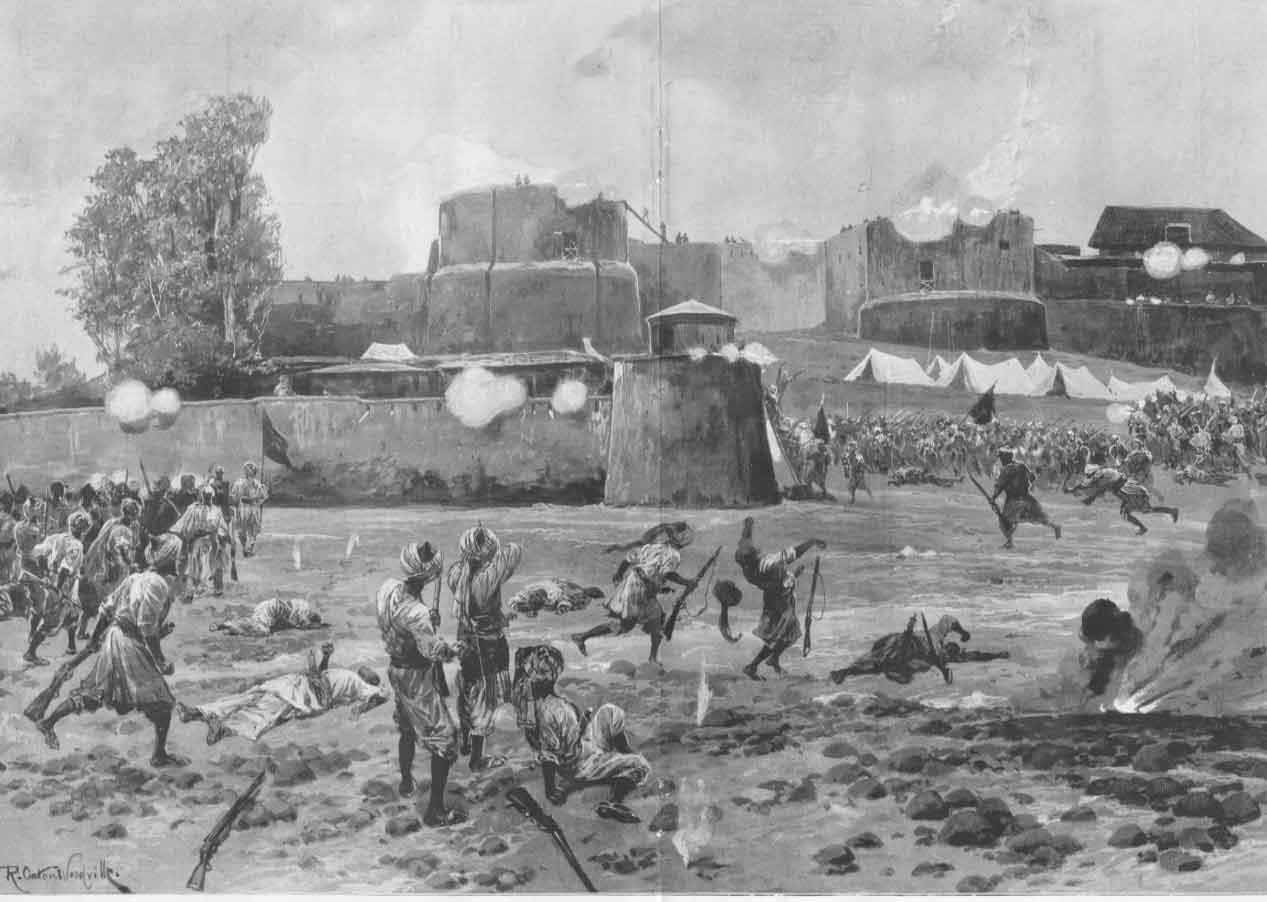
- Pashtun tribesmen attack the British-held fort during the 1897 Frontier Revolt

- Flag Seal

- Location within Pakistan Shabqadar (Pakistan) Shabqadar (South Asia) Shabqadar (Asia)
- Coordinates: 34°12′19.584″N 71°34′59.9448″E
- Country: Pakistan
- Province: Khyber Pakhtunkhwa
- District: Charsadda
- Tehsil: Shabqadar Tehsil

Government
  - Type: Municipal Corporation
  - Mayor: Vacant
  - Deputy Mayor: Vacant

Area
  - City: 194 km^{2} (75 sq mi)

Population (2023)
  - City: 102,340
  - Rank: 124th in Pakistan
  - Density: 528/km^{2} (1,370/sq mi)
- Time zone: UTC+5 (PKT)
- Postal Code: 24630
- Area code: 091
- Languages: Pashto, Urdu
- HDI (2017): ▲ ###' (high)

Shabqadar (Pashto: شبقدر pronounce, Urdu: شبقدر pronounce) is a city in the Charsadda District of Khyber Pakhtunkhwa province in Pakistan. It lies 28 kilometres (17 mi) north of provincial capital Peshawar.

== Overview and history ==
Shabqadar is the headquarter of Shabqadar Tehsil in Charsadda District. The famous attractions of Shabqadar are Shabqadar Bazaar and Shabqadar Fort. The fort is made of mud and stone. It was designed by Sikh architect Tota Ram in 1837. Currently it is under the control of Frontier Constabulary and has 1800 personnel of the force are trained here. Former UK prime minister Winston Churchill once stayed at this fort during his service and part of expedition in the North West Frontier of India. A frontier skirmish in Shabqadar on 15 November 1916 marked the first time air power was used by British Raj authorities in regional warfare.

== Education ==
Shabqadar Town is the home of many public and private educational institutes, including Government Degree College Shabqadar and Govt Girls Degree College Shabqadar. Notable private institutes include The Educators, SSA College system, Saddat Public High School Shabqadar, Shabqadar Students Academy (SSA), Frontier Students Academy (FSA), Allied Schools, Iqra Schools, Peshawar Model, ICEL College Of Engineering and Literacy, Charsadda institute of technology (CIT), PIT, Islamic School System, Hira Public School, National College and Islamia Model School.

University of Peshawar

Islamia College University

| Year | Literacy rate |
|---|---|
| 1972 | -- % |
| 1981 | -- % |
| 1998 | -- % |
| 2012 | -- % |
| 2015 | -- % |

== Demographics ==
The majority of the people living in Shabqadar are Pakistani but a sizeable population of Afghans also live there. Most are Muslims with small minority are Christians. Major language is Pashto. List of Shabqadar Tehsil union councils are listed below:

Main Tribes
| Sayyid; Gigyani; Bahlol Khel; Zeenar Khel; Dilazak; Akhonzada | Sheikhan; MianGan; Degankhel; Mandanr; Yousafzai | Mohmand; Shah Gul Khel; Swati |

=== Population ===
According to 2023 census, the population of Shabqadar, is 102,340. The population of Shabqadar, according to official census, over the years is shown in the table below.

Historical population
| Year | Pop. | ±% p.a. |
|---|---|---|
| 1961 | 11,046 | — |
| 1972 | 25,630 | +7.95% |
| 1981 | 30,881 | +2.09% |
| 1998 | 55,439 | +3.50% |
| 2017 | 91,490 | +2.67% |
| 2023 | 102,340 | +1.89% |

Languages

Languages of Shabqadar city (2023 Census)
1. Pashto (99.7%)
2. Urdu (0.10%)
3. Others (0.20%)

== See also ==
- Charsadda Tehsil
- Shabqadar Tehsil
- Tangi Tehsil
- Charsadda
- Charsadda District
