= Tangi, Pakistan =

Tangi Charsadda
- Location within Khyber Pakhtunkhwa Location within Pakistan
- Coordinates: 34°18′0″N 71°39′14″E
- Country: Pakistan
- Province: Khyber Pakhtunkhwa
- District: Peshawar District

Population (2023)
  - Total: 35,659
- Time zone: UTC+5 (PST)
- Postal code: 24540

Tangi is a tehsil and union council located in Charsadda District in the Khyber Pakhtunkhwa province of Pakistan.

== Overview and History ==
It is one of eight towns in Hashtnagar and is located at 34°18'0N 71°39'14E with an altitude of 327 metres (1076 feet) lying to the north-west of the district capital - Charsadda.

Dr. Nadeem Jan, who belongs to Tangi, was caretaker Federal Minister of Health, ahead of the 2024 general elections.

== Demographics ==
=== Population ===
Historical population
Year	Pop.	±% p.a.
1951	12,065	—
1961	14,706	+2.00%
1972	18,022	+1.87%
1981	19,492	+0.88%
1998	25,346	+1.56%
2017	33,012	+1.40%
2023	35,659	+1.29%

As of the 2023 census, Tangi had a population of 35,659. The population of Tangi, according to the 2017 census, is 33,012. The population of Tangi, according to official consensus, over the years is shown in the table below.

== Educational Institutes ==
Tangi is home to many good educational institutes. The most notable are Government Degree College Tangi and Govt Girls Degree College Tangi Charsadda.

== See also ==
- Utmanzai
- Umarzai
- Muhammadzai
