= Charsadda Tehsil =

Charsadda Tehsil تحصیل چارسدہ چارسدې تحصیل
- Tehsil
- Country: Pakistan
- Province: Khyber Pakhtunkhwa
- District: Charsadda

Government
  - Chairman: Abdul Rauf

Population (2017)
  - Tehsil: 804,194
  - Urban: 145,312
  - Rural: 658,882
- Time zone: UTC+5 (PST)
- Number of towns: 1
- Number of Union Councils: 34

Charsadda Tehsil is a tehsil located in Charsadda District, Khyber Pakhtunkhwa, Pakistan.

== History ==
During British rule Charsadda was the north-western tehsil of Peshawar District, with boundaries larger than they are today, lying between 34°2' and 34°32' N. and 71° 30' and 71° 56'E, with an area of 380 square miles (980 km^{2}). The population was 142,756 according to the 1901 census, an increase of almost 10,000 since the 1891 census (132,917). It contained three towns, Charsadda, Prang (19,354) and Tangi, with 168 villages. The land revenue and cesses amounted in 1903–4 to Rs. 360,000.

The tehsil consisted of the doab and the Hashtnagar tappas or circles. The former lies between the Adizai branch of the Kabul river and the Swat, and is fertile, highly cultivated, with numerous villages, and better wooded than other parts of the District; even the uplands which run along the foot of the Mohmand hills for their whole length are now irrigated by private canals. It is mainly held by the Gigyani tribe of Pakhtuns. The Hashtnagar tappa comprises a strip of plain country with a rich clay soil, which stretches 10 miles (16 km) eastward of the Swat, and from the Utman Khel hills on the north to the Kabul River on the south. It is held by Muhammadzai (Charsadda), and in it lies Charsadda, the headquarters of the tehsil. This tappa is intersected by the Swat River Canal.

== Administration ==
The tehsil is administratively subdivided into 34 Union Councils, four of which form the headquarters - Charsadda. Under KP local government act 2015, Charsadda is divided into 64 Village Councils (VC) and 11 Neighbourhood Councils (NC).

The population of Charsadda Tehsil, according to 2017 census, is 804,194, while according to the 1998 census, it was 527,152.

List of Union Councils in Tehsil Charsadda

#	Union Council	#	Union Council
1	UC-I	13	Behlola
2	UC-II	14	Dargai
3	UC-III	15	Dosehra
4	UC-IV	16	Sheikho
5	Agra	17	Meera Prang
6	Tarnab	18	Nisatta
7	Hisara Yaseen Zai	19	Dheri Zardad
8	Utman Zai	20	Mera Umer Zai
9	Turangzai	21	Chindro Dag
10	Sarki Titara	22	Umer Zai
11	Muhammad Nari	23	Rajjar-I
12	Khan Mai	24	Rajjar-II
		25	Gunda Karkana

== See also ==
- Tangi Tehsil
- Shabqadar Tehsil
- Charsadda District
