= PK-30 Shangla-III =

Pakistani electoral district

- Constituency for the Khyber Pakhtunkhwa Assembly
- Region: Alpuri Tehsil, Chakesar and Puran Tehsils (partly) of Shangla District

Current constituency
- Created: 2023
- Created from: PK-23 Shangla-I (2018-2023); PK-24 Shangla-II (2018-2023)

PK-30 Shangla-III (پی کے-30 شانگلہ-3) is a constituency for the Khyber Pakhtunkhwa Assembly of the Khyber Pakhtunkhwa province of Pakistan. This constituency was created in 2023 Delimitations after Shangla District gained 1 seat.

== See also ==
- PK-29 Shangla-II
- PK-31 Kohistan Upper
