= Shangla (disambiguation) =

Shangla is a district of Khyber Pakhtunkhwa, Pakistan.

Shangla may also refer to:

- Shangla Pass, a linking road in Pakistan

== See also ==
- Shang-a-Lang (disambiguation)
- Shangri-La (disambiguation)
