= PK-29 Shangla-II =

Pakistani electoral district

- Constituency for the Khyber Pakhtunkhwa Assembly
- Region: Chakesar and PuranTehsils (partly), Makhuzai and Martung Tehsils of Shangla District

Current constituency
- Party: Awami National Party
- Member(s): Faisal Zeb Fazlullah Pir Muhammad khan Pir Muhammad Khan ( multiple Times )
- Created from: PK-88 Shangla-II (2002-2018); PK-24 Shangla-II (2018-2023)

PK-29 Shangla-II (پی کے-29 شانگلہ-2) is a constituency for the Khyber Pakhtunkhwa Assembly of the Khyber Pakhtunkhwa province of Pakistan.

== See also ==
- PK-28 Shangla-I
- PK-30 Shangla-III
