= Bengal (disambiguation) =

Bengal is a region in South Asia.

Bengal or Bengals may also refer to:

== Places ==
=== South Asia ===
- Bengal Subah, the largest subdivision and de-facto independent state within the Mughal Empire
- Bengal Presidency, a large administrative division of British India, precursor to the next three:
  - East Bengal, a historical region, became East Pakistan and then Bangladesh
  - West Bengal, a state of India
  - Bangladesh, a country in South Asia
- Bay of Bengal, northeastern part of the Indian Ocean

=== United States ===
- Bengal, Indiana, an unincorporated community
- Bengal, Kentucky, an unincorporated community
- Bengal Township, Michigan
- Bengal, Minnesota
- Bengal, Missouri, an unincorporated community

== Science and technology ==
=== Plants and animals ===
- Bengal cat, a hybrid cat breed, crossing the domestic cat, Felis catus, with the leopard cat, Prionailurus bengalensis
- Bengal tiger, Panthera tigris tigris, native to the Indian subcontinent
- Bengal fox (AKA, Indian fox), Vulpes bengalensis, another mammal native to the Indian subcontinent
- Bengal rose or Rosa chinensis, a white fragrant rose
- Bengal Hound or Sarail Hound, a dog breed native to Bangladesh

=== Others ===
- Rose bengal, a stain used in biological analysis

== Sports ==
- Bayou Bengals, a nickname for the LSU Tigers athletic team
- Beckley Bengals, an American baseball team of 1930s
- Buffalo State Bengals, sports teams of Buffalo State College in Buffalo, New York
- Cincinnati Bengals, an American football franchise
- Idaho State Bengals, sports teams of Idaho State University in Pocatello, Idaho
- Trenton Bengals, two separate American basketball teams of 1920s and 1930s
- Khulna Royal Bengals, was a Bangladesh Premier League cricket team based in Khulna

== Transportation ==
- Bengal (1799 EIC ship)
- Bengal (1811 EIC ship)
- HMIS Bengal (J243), a 1942 Bathurst class corvette of the Royal Indian Navy
- 45577 Bengal, a British LMS Jubilee Class locomotive

== Other ==
- Bengal Foundation, a Bangladeshi non-profit and charitable organization.
- Bengal (character), a fictional character in Marvel Comics
- BENGAL (project), European 1990s marine research project
- Bengal Circuit, a Hindi film distribution circuit in India, comprising West Bengal and Northeast India and also Bhutan

== See also ==
- Bengali (disambiguation)
- Bengala (disambiguation)
- Bengala or bengalo, alternative terms for flares
- Bengal Province (disambiguation)
- East Bengal (disambiguation)
- Pakistani Bengal (disambiguation)
- Bengel (disambiguation)
- Bangle (disambiguation)
- Bangla (disambiguation)
- Banga (disambiguation)
