= Maidan, Pakistan =

Maidan valley میدان Maidan or Maydan
- Maidan sub division
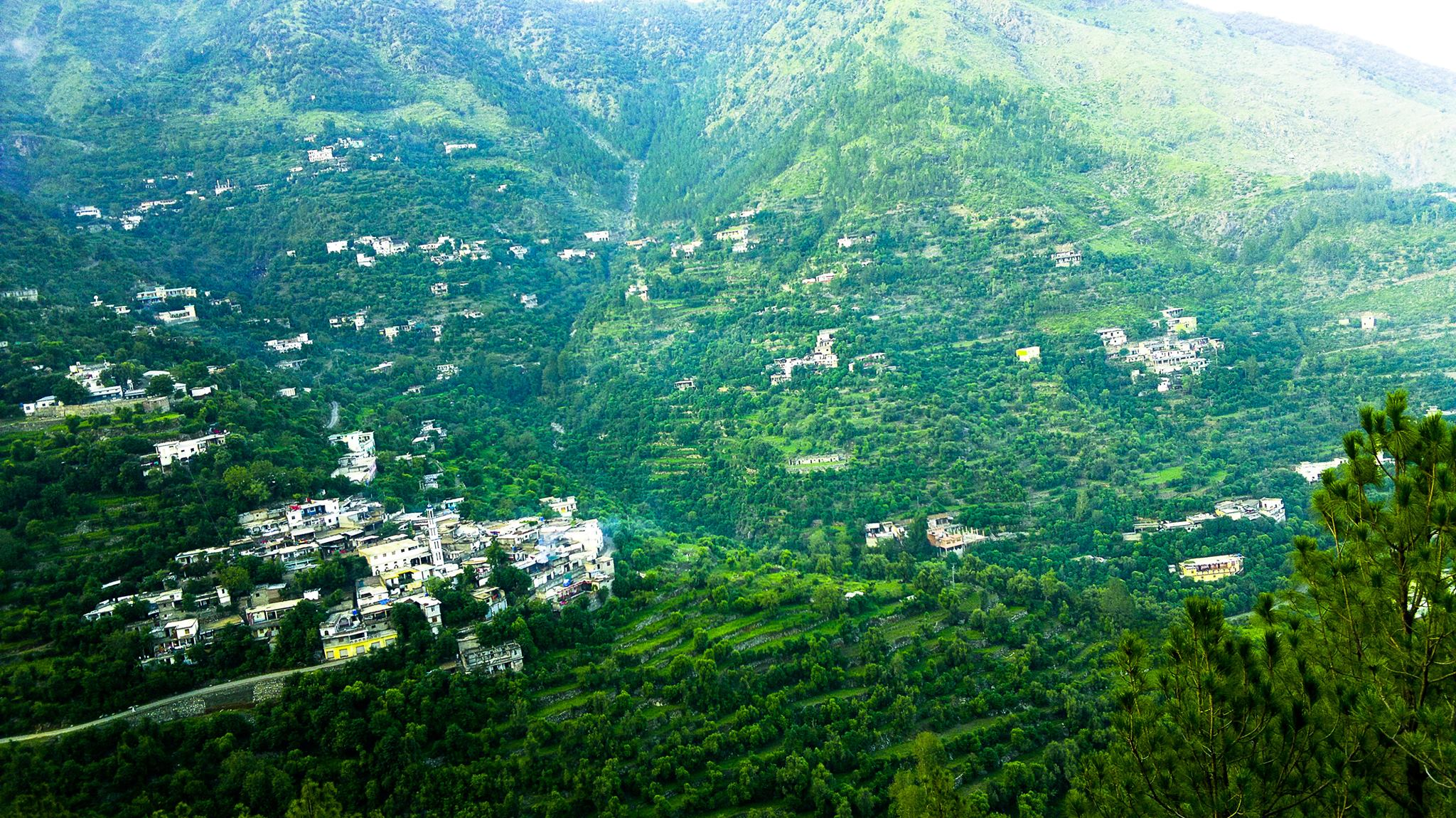
- Village in the Maidan Valley
- Country: Pakistan
- Province: Pukhtunkhwa
- Tehsil: Lal Qilla
- District: Dir Lower
- Language: Pashto
- Religion: Islam
- Time zone: PST

Maidan is a valley in the Lower Dir District of the Khyber Pakhtunkhwa province of Pakistan. The inhabitants of Maidan are mostly Pashtuns. The most numerous tribe living in Maidan is Ismailzai or Samelzai. It is one of the four clans of Tarkani also called Tarkalani tribe. Maidan was not directly under the control of Pakistan government at the time of partition, the valley was governed by a Nawab named "Nawab Shah Jehan". This region was part of the separate state named "Royal State of the Dir" till the 1960s. In 1961, Maidan came directly under the control of the Government of Pakistan. The main bazaar of Maidan Valley is Kumbar. There is a rural health centre situated at Lal Qilla region. Kumbar is the main business center in the valley. The valley passes through high mountains that are covered with snow in the winter season.

Maidan is known for its lush green mountains and springs in the summer season. Kumber, being the main village of the Maidan valley, is a big trade centre comprising many commercial markets. People from various villages of the valley come to Kumbar Bazaar to fulfill their daily needs. Most of the population of the valley go abroad for earning their livings.

Tehsil Maidan has recently been declared a subdivision, which comprises five Union Councils: Lal Qilla, Kotkay, Bashigram, Zaimdara and Gal. There are two police stations in Maidan, namely Lal Qilla and Zaimdara.

== Religions, language and peoples ==
The peoples of Maidan are mostly Pashtuns and they speak the Pashto language. They are mostly Sunni Muslims.

== History ==
Early Maidan was under the Nawab rule. But after 1965, Maidan or Dir became a part of the Islamic Republic of Pakistan.

== Crops ==
Wheat, maize, rice and walnuts are common in the region.

== Politics ==
Four main parties participate in politics: JI, PPP, ANP and PTI. PTI won the election in 2018 and Malak Liaqat Ali became a MPA and Bashir Khan MNA of Madian.
