= Fazlullah (politician) =

Pakistani politician

Fazlullah (فضل الله) (born November 4, 1980 in Puran, Shangla District) is a Pakistani politician, who was elected in 2008 election as Member of the Provincial Assembly of Pakistan (MPA) on Independent seat from PF-88 Shangla-II NWFP Pakistan. He is son of Pir Muhammad Khan, Ex-Provincial Minister. During his five years tenure that ended in March 2013, he supported the Awami National Party government of Khyber Pakhtunkhwa and changed his political affiliations twice. In the 2013 General Election, he contested on PML-N ticket from the same constituency (listed as Fazl Ullah Khan) but lost to Abdul Munim, a comparatively less popular independent candidate.
