= Khan Roshan Khan =

Pashtun historian and writer (1914–1988)

Khan Roshan Khan خان روشن خان
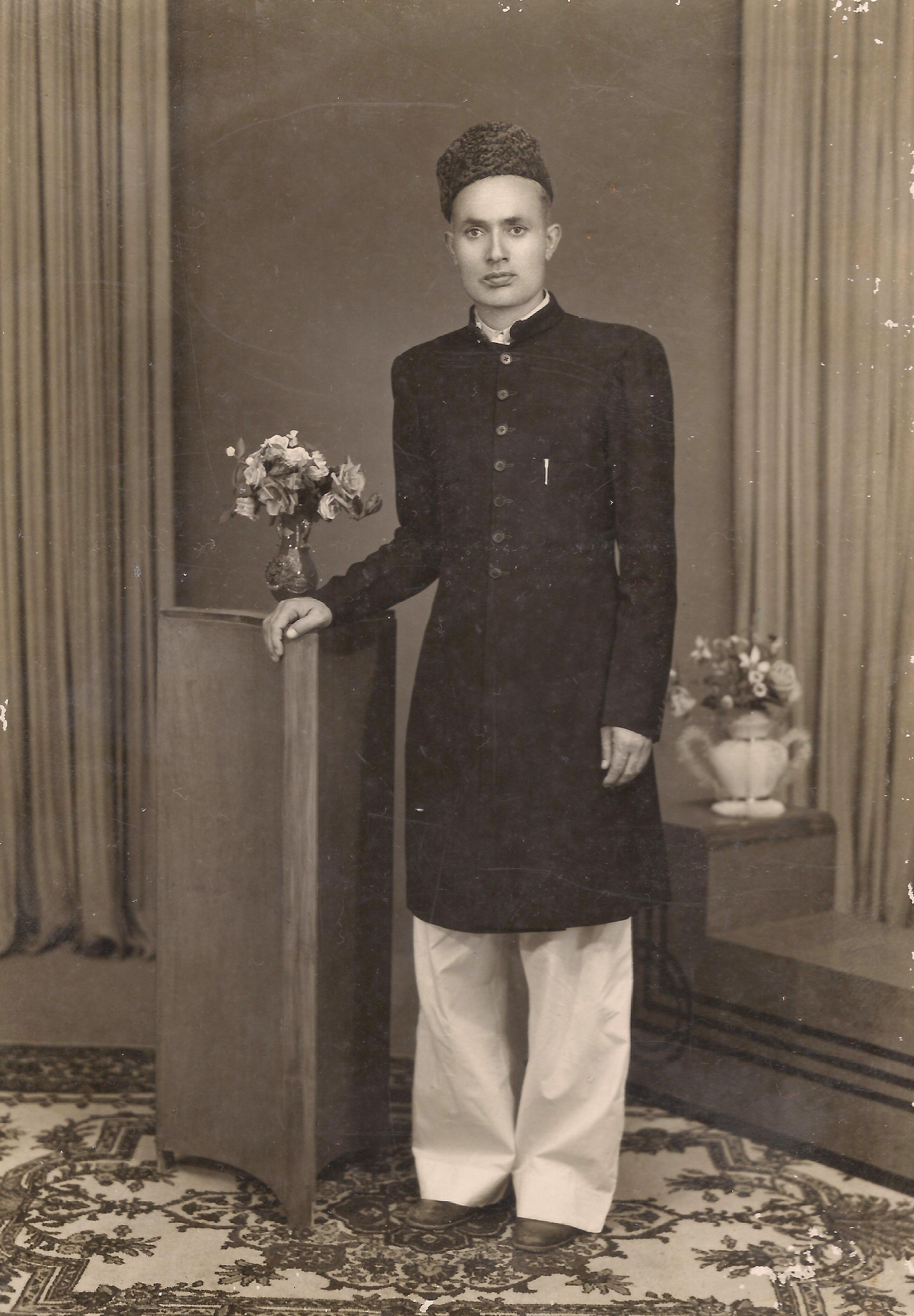
- Born: November 1914; Karnal Sher Killi or Nawa Killi, Swabi, North-West Frontier Province, British Raj (present-day Pakistan)
- Died: November 19, 1988 (aged 73–74); Florida, United States
- Citizenship: British Indian (1914–1947); Pakistani (1947–1988)
- Known for: Islam, Khudai Khidmatgar, Pushto literature, Urdu literature, History and author of: Tawarikh-e-Hafiz Rehmat Khani, Tazkira (Pathano ki Asliyat aur in ki Tarikh), Yousafzai Qaum ki Sarguzisht, Afghano ki Nasli Tarikh, Maleka-e-Swat, Baba-e-Qaum Sheikhmali
- Awards: Pride of Performance
- Scientific career
- Fields: History, Pushto literature, Urdu literature

Khan Roshan Khan Yousafzai (Pashto: خان روشن خان; November 1907 – 19 November 1988) was a Pashtun historian, educationalist, writer and local leader from Pakistan known primarily for being president of the All India Muslim League in Swabi and for writing books on the history of the Pashtun people.

== Biography ==
Roshan Khan was born in the village of Nawa Killi, Swabi in 1907 and died on 19 November 1988 in the United States. He was the son of Muhammad Zaman Khan. He wrote many books on the history of Pashtuns. He was a major figure in contemporary Pashto literature. Roshan Khan was also an active member of the movement Khudai Khidmatgar. He was very energetic in the Pakistan Movement and was the president of the Muslim League in Swabi. An area in Swabi, called Roshan Pura is named after him, where his tomb is also located.

== Career ==
Khan received his primary education from the Islami School Uthmanzai in Charsadda. Later on, he could not pursue further education due to the worsening conditions during the time of the British Government of India. The changing circumstances diverted his attention towards history. He wrote books on the history of Pashtuns. These books are Tazkira, Pathanon ki Tareekh aur in ki asliat which describes the races of Pashtun tribes and their origins. In addition, he wrote Yousafzai qaum ki sarguzisht, which details the various tribes of Pashtuns. Khan also authored Afghano ki nasli tarikh, which describes the origin of Afghans (Pashtuns) from Bani Israel, (that is, the theory that the Pashtuns are descended from the biblical Israelites). Other booklets include Malika-Sawat, Baba-e-qaum Sheikhmali (RA) among others. His most important work is Tawarikh-e-Hafiz Rehmat Khani, which includes details about the biographies of prominent Pashtun leaders and elders like Hafiz Rehmat Khan, Hafiz Alpuri (Abdulsamad) of Shangla, Ahmed Shah Abdali, Sardar Mohammad Khan, Dost Muhammad Khan and many others. It also sheds light on the important events and wars of Pashtuns with other empires and tribes. Moreover, all the family trees of Pashtun tribes are also discussed in this book. He also discussed the brief history of a famous Pashtun tribe, Shalmani.

== Books written by Roshan Khan ==
- Tawarikh-e Hafiz Rehmat Khani, 3rd Edition, 1977, Peshawar Pushtu Academy, Peshawar University.
- Tazkarah (Pathano ki Asliyat aur in ki Tarikh), 1st Edition, 1980, Karachi Roshan Khan Education Trust.
- Afghano ki Nasli Tarikh, 1st Edition, 1981, Karachi Roshan Khan and Company.
- Yousafzai Qaum ki Sarguzisht, 1st Edition, 1986, Karachi Roshan Khan and Company.
- Malika-e Swat, 1st Edition, 1983, Roshan Khan, Nawan Killi, Swabi District, Pakistan.
- Baba-ye Qaum Sheikhmali (RA), 1st Edition, 1985, Roshan Khan and Company, Phool Chowk, Karachi, Pakistan.

=== Malika-e-Swat ===
The book Malika-e-Swat includes the story of the wedding of Mughal king Babur to the daughter Bibi Mubaraka Yousafzai of Malik Shahmansoor Yusufzai. This book also describes the events and the times when the Yousafzais entered Swat. Their life and the battles which took place between the king of Swat Sultan Awais and the Yusufzai Pashtuns. The book is mainly about the life and martyrdom of Shaheeda Bibi, who was the sister of Malik Ahmed and was the wife of the king of Swat, Sultan Awais. After her marriage with Sultan Awais she was called the Queen of Sawat.
