= Bengalai =

Town in Shangla District, Khyber Pakhtunkhwa, Pakistan

Bengalai or Bangali is a town in Puran Shangla District of Khyber Pakhtunkhwa in Pakistan. It is situated between the Aloch and Sundavi villages. The SMC Hospital is situated between Aloch and Bangali, Puran. Faiz Muhammad Khan was the famous Khan of this village.
