= PK-28 Shangla-I =

Pakistani electoral district

- Constituency for the Khyber Pakhtunkhwa Assembly
- Region: Chakesar Tehsil, Shahpur Kana and Bisham Tehsils of Shangla District

Current constituency
- Party: Pakistan Tehreek-e-Insaf
- Member: Muhammad Rashad Khan
- Created from: PK-87 Shangla-I (before 2018); PK-23 Shangla-I (2018-2023)

PK-28 Shangla-I (پی کے-28 شانگلہ-1) is a constituency for the Khyber Pakhtunkhwa Assembly of the Khyber Pakhtunkhwa province of Pakistan.

== See also ==
- PK-27 Buner-III
- PK-29 Shangla-II
