= 2009 Alpuri bombing =

Suicide bombing in Pakistan

Alpuri Bomb Blast 2009
- 2009 Alpuri bombing (Pakistan)
- Location: 34.54°N 72.39°E; Alpuri, Shangla District, Khyber Pakhtunkhwa, Pakistan
- Date: 12 October 2009; 13:15 Pakistan Standard Time
- Target: Pakistan security personnel
- Attack type: Suicide attack; car bombing; terrorist attack
- Deaths: 47 (+1 suicide bomber)
- Injuries: 44
- Perpetrator: Tehrik-i-Taliban Pakistan (TTP)

On 12 October 2009, a suicide bomber detonated himself next to a military truck as it passed through a busy market in Alpuri town, Shangla District, Pakistan. Shangla is a district adjacent to the Swat Valley, which was recently the focus of a military operation against the Taliban.

In April, Pakistan's army launched an offensive to eliminate the Taliban insurgency in Swat and nearby districts. Mian Iftikhar Hussain, the information minister for the troubled North West Frontier Province, stated that the bombing killed 41 people and injured 45 others. A few days later, the death toll increased to 47.

== Background ==
=== Fall of Shangla ===
Shangla District was invaded by Tehreek-e-Taliban Pakistan (TTP) in 2007. Following the invasion, numerous villages in the district fell under Taliban control, making Shangla a significant hotspot for Taliban activities in the region. Despite a number of military operations by the Pakistani Army, the Taliban presence could not be fully dislodged at the end of 2007.

In 2008, the Pakistani army managed to clear a substantial part of the district from Taliban influence; however, the insurgency persisted. Following the clearance, Shangla continued to experience frequent suicide attacks and targeted killings. Amid subsequent attempts to assert full government control over Shangla, Taliban insurgents continued to target the security forces and checkpoints.

== Attack ==
A spokesperson from the army-operated Swat Media Centre reported that the suicide bomber targeted a convoy passing through a security checkpoint near a bustling market in Alpuri town, Shangla. The attack resulted in 47 fatalities, including six Pakistani soldiers.

At the time, Pakistani President Asif Ali Zardari condemned the attack. Then-Prime Minister Yousuf Raza Gilani expressed condolences for the victims and called for an investigation into the incident.

== Aftermath ==
Following the deadly attack, several investigations were conducted, leading to the arrest of multiple individuals for questioning.
