= Bengala =

Bengala may refer to:

== People ==
- Bengala (wrestler), the name of several Mexican professional wrestlers
- Bengala (footballer), Brazilian footballer and manager (1906–1980)
- Jim Bengala, captain of the 1970 Miami Redskins football team

== Places ==
- Bengala River, in Rio de Janeiro state, Brazil
- Porto Grande de Bengala, the historic Portuguese settlement in Chittagong, Bangladesh

== Others ==
- Bengala (album), a 2018 album by Lorenzo Fragola
- Bengala or bengalo, alternative terms for flares
- Bengala barb (Bengala elanga), species of fish

== See also ==
- Bengal (disambiguation)
- Bengalai, a town in Shangla District, Khyber Pakhtunkhwa, Pakistan
