= Lilownai =

Lilownai is a village in Shangla District, Khyber Pakhtunkhwa province in Pakistan. It is at a distance of 5 kilometers from the district headquarter Alpuri. It is surrounded by high mountains, green meadows, and lakes. Lilownai lies near to Shahpoor and Alpurai.
