= Sandovi =

Village in pakistan

Sundavi is a town of Puran tehsil, Shangla District in the North-West Frontier Province of Pakistan. Babozai sub sections Ado khel, Musa Khel, tribe are living in this village. Yusufzai Pashtun tribe.
