= Manwan =

Manwan may refer to:

- Manwan, Pakistan, settlement in the Khyber-Pakhtunkhwa province of Pakistan.
- Manwan Dam, dam in China
