= Sundavi =

Sundavi is a town in Puran Tehsil, Shangla District in the Khyber Pakhtunkhwa of Pakistan.

A view of Sundavi Puran

People from the Babozai sub-sections Ado Khel & Musa Khel live in the town, District leader of Shangla Ayub Khan of the Awami National Party is from Sundavi. The prominent advocate shahid ullah (son of Ayub khan)&RAHIM ZADA (the brother of great hakeem Gul Zada) puran bar at law also belong to sundavi. In local government system Sundavi is given the status of a Village and its own Village Council will be elected. Sanam, Ganourai, Faiza, Makra, Shwar and Allagram are the neighbouring small villages which are included in the Village Council Sundavi.
