= Sanila =

Sanila may refer to:

- Sanila (lieutenant), a medieval Spanish lieutenant
- Sanila, Pakistan, a town in Pakistan
- Tiina Sanila, a Skolt Sámi rock star.
