= Hafiz Alpuri =

18th century Pashto poet

- حافظ الپوري بابا
- Born: Abdul Samad Yousafzai; 1670; Utmanzai, Charsadda, Khyber Pakhtunkhwa, Pakistan
- Died: 1790 (aged 119–120); Alpuri, Shangla, Khyber Pakhtunkhwa, Pakistan
- Resting place: Alpuri, Shangla
- Other names: Hafiz BaBa; Abdul Samad
- Known for: Islamic Sufi, Poet and Scholar
- Children: 2

Hafiz Alpuri (Pashto: حافظ الڀورئ) was a Sufi Pashto poet who served the Pushto literature a lot. He was the poet of Rahman Baba calibre. He was called Hafiz-e- Alpuri because he had learnt the Quran by heart and belonged to village Alpuri, a beautiful valley in District Shangla Pakistan. He is famous for his collection of poetry called Dewan-e- Hafiz-e- Alpuri.

According to “Tawarikh e hafiz rehmat khani” of Khan Roshan Khan, his real name was Abdul Samad. He was born in the valley of Ghorband, Alpuri in Shangla District. He belonged to the famous Mandan Yousafzai tribe of Pashtun. He received his early education at Khwaza Khela which was a great centre of Islamic education at that time. He compiled a collection of his poetry known as Dewan-e- Hafiz-e- Alpuri. Dewan-e- Hafiz-e-Alpuri was published after his death in 1927. His poetry is classified into four chapters on the basis of composition. Chapter one contains oneness of God and Prophethood, second real love with God, third code and conduct of life and fourth counsel and advice. The purpose of his poetry teaches to do the right and condemn the wrong. Hafiz Alpuri was the first to use fables and legends in his poetry.

Hafiz Alpuri died at the age of 67 years in 1225 Hijra (1810). He was buried in Alpuri.

== See also ==
- Rahman Baba
- Shangla District
