= Bengel =

Bengel may refer to:

- Bengel (Mosel), a municipality in Rhineland-Palatinate, Germany
- Jakob Bengel, a chain and costume-jewelry factory in Idar-Oberstein, Rhineland-Palatinate, Germany
- Frank Bengel (born 1969), German professor and physician
- Johann Albrecht Bengel (1687–1752), Württemberger Lutheran clergyman and scholar

== See also ==
- Norma Bengell (1935–2013), Brazilian actress, singer, screenwriter and director
- Bengal (disambiguation)
