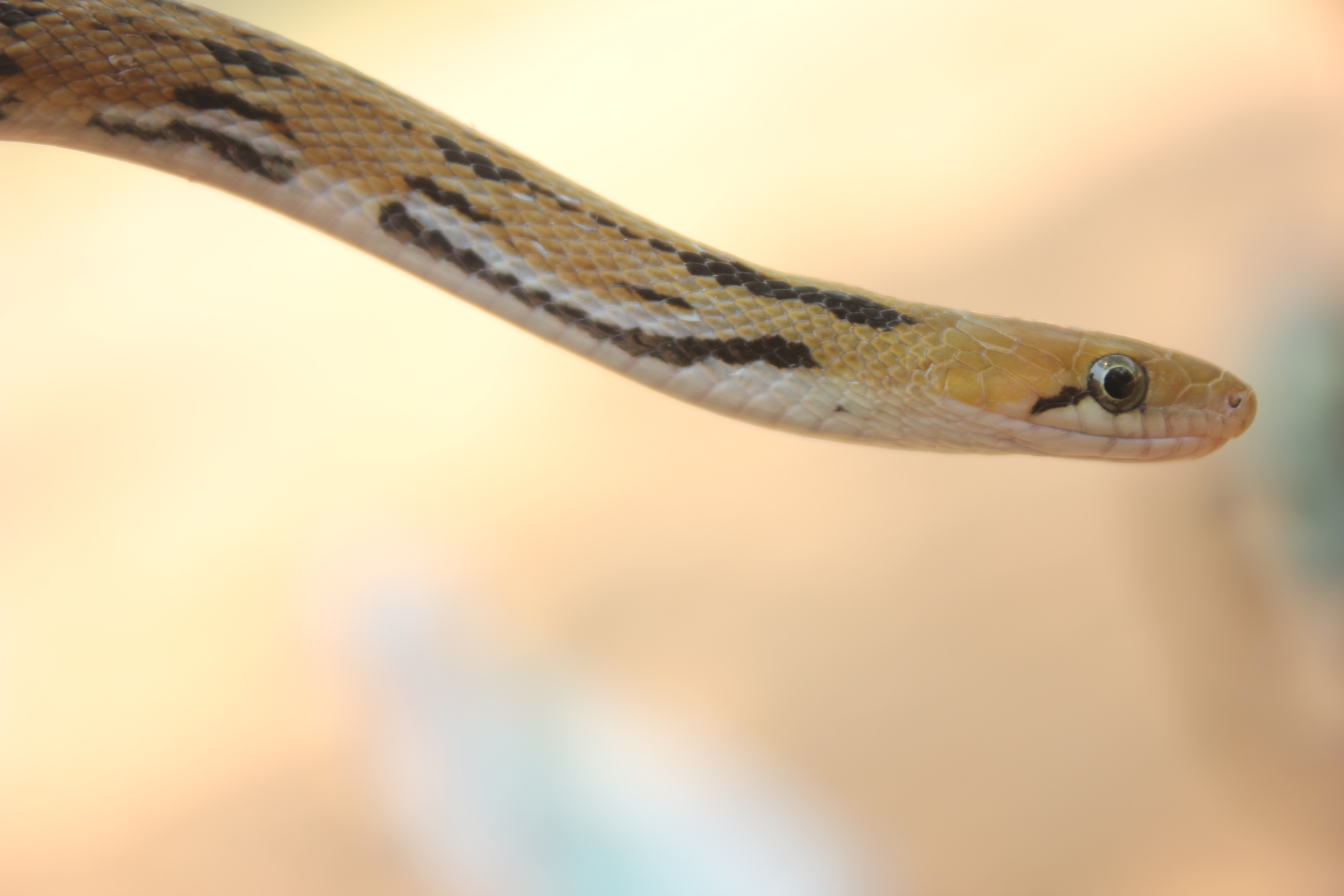
- Close up shot of a common trinket snake captured near Patnagarh, Odisha, India.

Conservation status
- Least Concern (IUCN 3.1)

Scientific classification
- Kingdom: Animalia
- Phylum: Chordata
- Class: Reptilia
- Order: Squamata
- Suborder: Serpentes
- Family: Colubridae
- Genus: Coelognathus
- Species: C. helena

Binomial name
- Coelognathus helena (Daudin, 1803)

Synonyms
- Coluber helena Daudin, 1803; Herpetodryas helena — Schlegel, 1837; Cynophis bistrigatus Gray, 1849; Plagiodon helena — A.M.C. Duméril, Bibron & A.H.A. Duméril, 1854; Herpetodryas malabaricus Jerdon, 1854; Cynophis helena — Günther, 1858; Coluber helena — Boulenger, 1894; Elaphe helena — M.A. Smith, 1943; Coelognathus helena — Helfenberger, 2001

= Trinket snake =

Common trinket snake

Species of snake

The trinket snake (Coelognathus helena), also known commonly as the common trinket snake, is a species of nonvenomous constricting snake in the family Colubridae. The species is native to southern Central Asia.

== Etymology ==
The specific name of this snake, helena, is thought to be a reference to Helen of Troy, considered by many to be the epitome of female beauty and the most beautiful woman in the world.

== Geographic range ==
C. helena is found in Sri Lanka, southern India, Pakistan (Shangla), Nepal, and Bangladesh.

Its type locality is "India: Vishakhapatnam" (Daudin, 1803).

== Description ==
See snake scales for terms used.

C. helena has the following scalation. The rostral is a little broader than deep, and visible from above. The suture between the internasals is much shorter than that between the prefrontals. The frontal is as long as its distance from the end of the snout, but shorter than the parietals. The loreal is somewhat longer than deep. One large preocular and two postoculars are present. The temporals are arranged 2+2 or 2+3. There are 9 (exceptionally 10 or 11) upper labials, and the fifth and sixth (or fourth, fifth, and sixth) enter the eye. There are 5 or 6 lower labials in contact with the anterior chin shields. The anterior chin shields are as long as or a little longer than the posterior chin shields.

The dorsal scales are in 23 to 27 rows at midbody, smooth, or feebly keeled on the posterior part of the body and on the tail. The ventrals number 220-265; the anal plate is entire; and the subcaudals number 75-94.

The young are pale brown above, with black crossbands, each crossband enclosing four to six white ocelli. The adults are darker brown, with a transverse series of squarish black spots, or with more or less distinct traces of the color pattern of the young. There is a vertical black streak below the eye, and an oblique black streak behind the eye. Some specimens have a white, black-edged collar; others have two black longitudinal streaks on the head; and others are intermediate in this respect. The lower parts are yellowish, with or without a few small black spots, sometimes with a more or less distinct festooned marking on each side.

Adults may attain a total length of 4.5 ft (1.4 m), which includes a tail 10 in (25 cm) long.

== Subspecies ==
Three subspecies of C. helena are recognized as being valid, including the nominotypical subspecies.

- C. h. helena (Daudin, 1803)
- C. h. monticollaris (Schulz, 1992)
- C. h. nigriangularis Mohapatra, Schulz, Helfenberger, Hofmann & Dutta, 2016

Nota bene: A trinomial authority in parentheses indicates that the subspecies was originally described in a genus other than Coelognathus.

== Habitat ==
The preferred natural habitat of C. helena is forest, at altitudes from sea level to 2,500 m (8,200 ft), but it also found around houses.

== Diet ==
The trinket snake preys upon rodents (mice, rats, squirrels), small snakes, geckos, and frogs.

== Behaviour ==
C. helena is both diurnal and nocturnal.

It is noted for its temper and will strike repeatedly if molested. The males of this species are generally more aggressive than the females. Its bites are often very damaging due to its inward pointing teeth.

== Reproduction ==
C. helena is oviparous. Eggs are laid throughout the year, and clutch size is 6–12 elongated eggs.

== Gallery ==
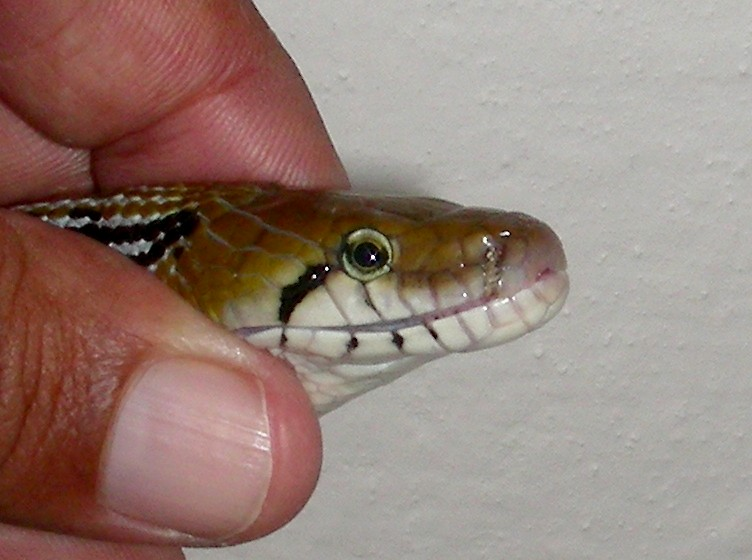
Sideview of trinket snake head

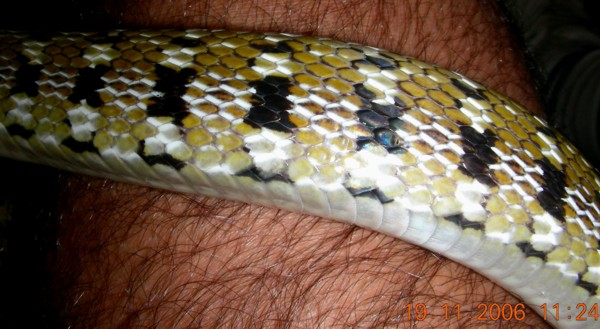
Pattern on anterior half of body

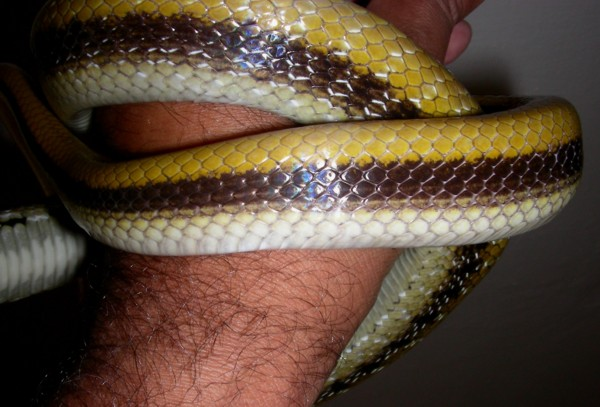
Pattern on posterior half of body

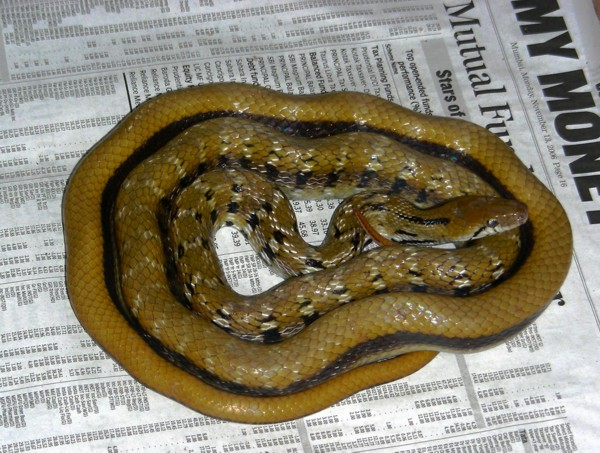
Trinket snake, coiled up
