= Abdul Munim =

Pakistani politician

Special Assistants (Tourism Department)
- In office 1 April 2014 – 23 February 2018

Member of the Provincial Assembly of Khyber Pakhtunkhwa
- In office 31 May 2013 – 23 February 2018
- Constituency: PK-88 (Shangla-II)

Personal details
- Party: PTI (2015-present)
- Other political affiliations: AJP (2013-2015)
- Occupation: Politician

Abdul Munim is a Pakistani politician hailing from Nimkalay, Shangla District. He served as a Special Assistant in the Tourism Department and a member of the Khyber Pakhtunkhwa Assembly belonging to the Pakistan Tehreek-e-Insaf.

He was disqualified to hold public office by the Supreme Court of Pakistan in February 2018.
