= Muhammad Rashad Khan =

Pakistani politician

MPA Muhammad Rashad Khan

Member of the Khyber Pakhtunkhwa Assembly
- In office 31 May 2013 – 28 May 2018
- Constituency: PK-87 (Shangla-I)

Personal details
- Born: 26 August 1980 (age 46)
- Party: PMLN (2013-present)
- Occupation: Politician

Muhammad Rashad Khan is a Pakistani politician from Shangla District who had been a member of the Khyber Pakhtunkhwa Assembly and belongs to the Pakistan Muslim League (N). He also served as the chairman and as a member of various committees.

== Political career ==
Khan was elected as the member of the Khyber Pakhtunkhwa Assembly on the ticket of the Pakistan Muslim League (N) from PK-87 (Shangla-I) in the 2013 Khyber Pakhtunkhwa provincial election. He received 15,316 votes and defeated Haji Said Fareen, a candidate of the Awami National Party (ANP).

He ran for the Provincial Assembly as a candidate of the PML(N) from PK-23 Shangla-I in the 2018 Khyber Pakhtunkhwa provincial election, but was unsuccessful. He received 16,007 votes and was defeated by Shaukat Ali Yousafzai, a candidate of the Pakistan Tehreek-e-Insaf (PTI).
