= Chagam =

Town in Khyber Pakhtunkhwa, Pakistan

Chagam is a town in Puran, tehsil of Shangla.

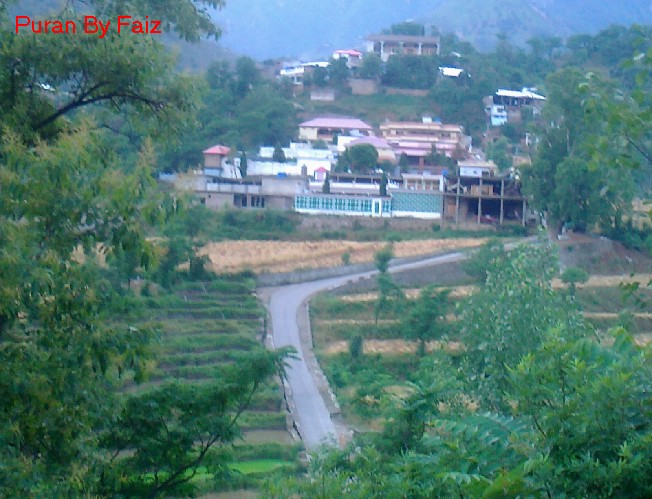
A view of Chagam, Puran

District of Khyber Pakhtunkhwa in Pakistan. Most of the inhabitants of Chagma belong to Ado Khel Musa Khel and Zata khel branches of the subtribe Babozai of the major Pathan tribe Yousafzai. Amir Muqam president of PML(N) Khyber-Pakhtunkhwa belong to village Chagam Puran Tehsil of District Shangla.
