= Bisham Tehsil =

Tehsil in Khyber Pakhtunkhwa, Pakistan

Bisham Tehsil: تحصیل بشام (Urdu); بشام تحصیل (Pashto)
- Tehsil
- The Bisham Valley in 2015

- Location within Khyber Pakhtunkhwa Location within Pakistan
- Coordinates: 34°52′47″N 72°53′40″E
- Country: Pakistan
- Province: Khyber Pakhtunkhwa
- Division: Malakand
- District: Shangla

Area
  - Total: 184 km^{2} (71 sq mi)

Population (2023)
  - Total: 121,279
  - Density: 659/km^{2} (1,710/sq mi)
- Time zone: UTC+5 (PKT)

Bisham Tehsil (Note: Urdu: تحصیل بشام; Pashto: بشام تحصیل) is a tehsil of Shangla District in Khyber Pakhtunkhwa, Pakistan. As of the 2023 Pakistani census, the population of Bisham Tehsil was 121,279.

The tehsil headquarters hospital serves residents of multiple tehsils in Shangla District but suffers from staff shortages and logistical issues. Major roads like the Bisham–Swat Road pass through the tehsil but are susceptible to landslides caused by heavy rains or snow.

== History ==
Bisham Tehsil was originally a sub-tehsil before being promoted by the Khyber Pakhtunkhwa government on 2 January 2016. The move was done in part so residents would no longer have to travel to the district headquarters Alpuri for government services.

Five Chinese engineers and a Pakistan driver were killed in a suicide bombing targeting their vehicle convoy in Bisham Tehsil on 26 March 2024. The Chinese nationals had departed from the national capital Islamabad and were on their way to work on the Dasu Dam, Pakistan's largest hydroelectric project. A lone attacker rammed his vehicle filled with explosives into the convoy, causing a large explosion that badly burnt the bodies of the victims and sent them into a gorge. The Pakistani government condemned the attack and offered its condolences to the Chinese embassy, which demanded a thorough investigation. No group claimed responsibility for the attack, but Pakistani authorities blamed the Pakistani Taliban, which denied involvement.

== Administration and geography ==
Farmland in Bisham Tehsil

Bisham Tehsil is a tehsil (subdistrict) of Shangla District in the province of Khyber Pakhtunkhwa, in northwest Pakistan. It spans an area of 184 square kilometres.

== Demographics ==
The 2023 Pakistani census recorded a population of 121,279 people in Bisham Tehsil. The average household size was 6.6 people.

== Infrastructure and services ==
=== Education ===
There is no boy's college in Bisham Tehsil, and the only girl's college was abandoned as of 2019. Local students attending boy's colleges in the district capital Alpuri proposed refurbishing and repurposing the girl's college as a boy's college that year, but no plans were made for such a project.

=== Hospitals ===
In January 2013, The Express Tribune reported on the poor state of the tehsil headquarters hospital, which reportedly served half of Shangla District's 500,000 residents at the time, as it was the main hospital for people in neighbouring tehsils as well. The hospital lacked basic medical equipment, clean drinking water, and sufficient electricity; it also did not have any specialists or women doctors, and its only ambulance was out of service. By December The Express Tribune reported that the hospital had dwindled to six medical staff with no improvements to logistics.

Dawn reported in May 2016 that the hospital was still suffering from staff shortages and logistical problems, forcing many residents to seek medical assistance and medicine from expensive private clinics.

=== Roads ===
The Bisham–Swat Road is a major road in the tehsil; it is vulnerable to landslides caused by heavy rains or snow. A bridge over the Khan Khwar River connects the villages (union councils) of Chichlo, Kormang, Sangrai, and Shahtoot.

== See also ==
- List of tehsils of Khyber Pakhtunkhwa
