= 2026 Sorange coal mine disaster =

2026 Sorange coal mine explosion in Quetta, Balochistan Province, Pakistan

- Date: July 30, 2026
- Time: 13:00 PST
- Location: Quetta, Balochistan, Pakistan
- Deaths: 36 dead

The 2026 Sorange coal mine explosion was a deadliest mining accident in recent years which happened on 30 July 2026 at the Sorange coal mine, located in Quetta in Balochistan Province, Pakistan. As a result of a gas explosion in the sorange coal mine, at least 36 miners were killed.

At the moment of explosion there were 42 miners working at the mine, 36 of them were trapped 3,000 to 4,000 feet deep inside the coal mine. Last two bodies were recovered after 45 hours of the rescue operation.

== Labors ==
Balochistan Chief Inspector of Mines Muhammad Atif said all 34 coal miners hailed from Khyber Pakhtunkhwa's Shangla district.

== Investigation ==
Following the tragic coal mine disaster in Sorange that claimed the lives of 34 miners, the Balochistan government has ordered a high-level inquiry. The investigation has been handed over to the Chief Minister's Inspection Team (CMIT) to uncover the exact causes of the accident and hold those responsible accountable.
