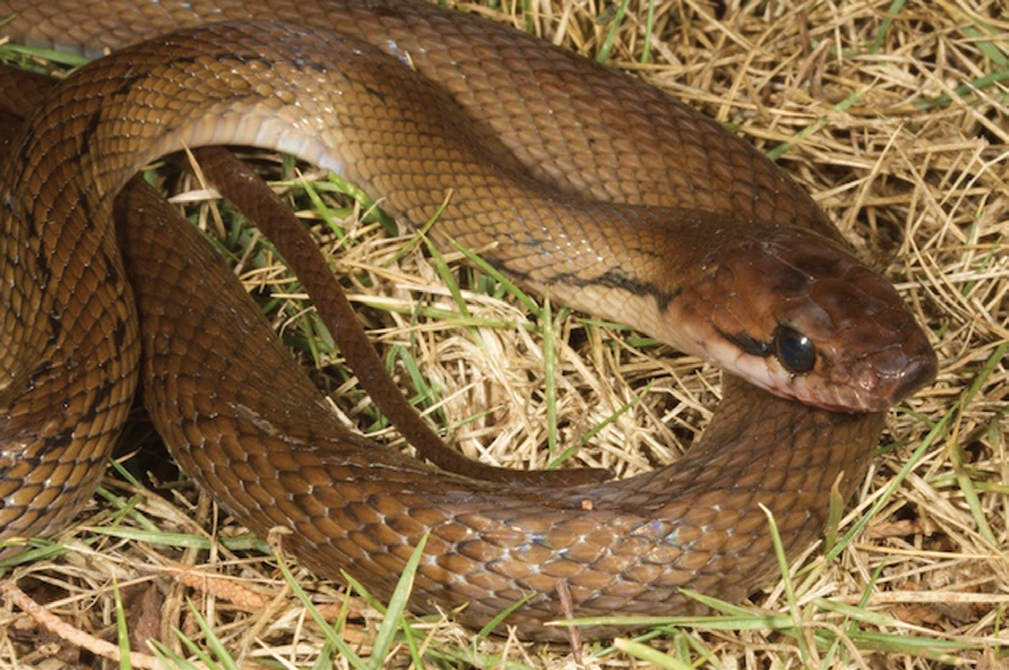

Conservation status
- Least Concern (IUCN 3.1)

Scientific classification
- Kingdom: Animalia
- Phylum: Chordata
- Class: Reptilia
- Order: Squamata
- Suborder: Serpentes
- Family: Colubridae
- Genus: Coelognathus
- Species: C. subradiatus

Binomial name
- Coelognathus subradiatus (Schlegel, 1837)

= Indonesian ratsnake =

Species of snake

The Indonesian ratsnake (Coelognathus subradiatus) is a species of snake of the family Colubridae.

== Geographic range ==
The snake is found in Indonesia.
