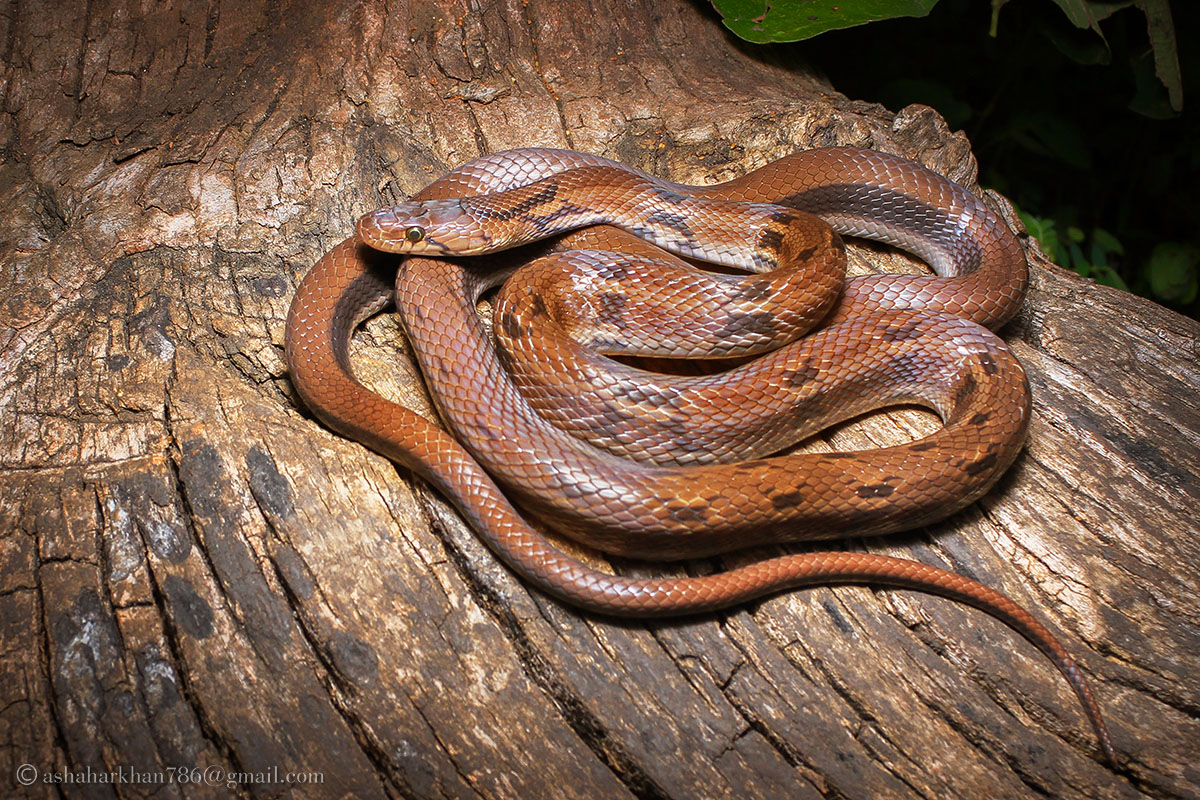
- Montane trinket snake (Coelognathus helena monticollaris)

Scientific classification
- Kingdom: Animalia
- Phylum: Chordata
- Class: Reptilia
- Order: Squamata
- Suborder: Serpentes
- Family: Colubridae
- Subfamily: Colubrinae
- Genus: Coelognathus; Fitzinger, 1843

= Coelognathus =

Genus of snakes

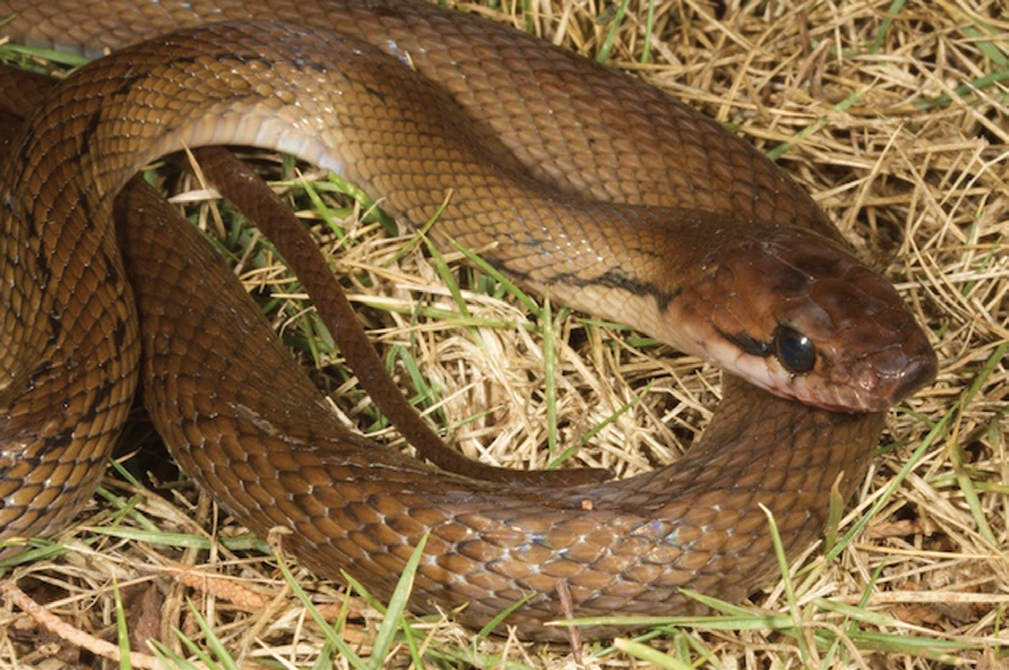
Indonesian ratsnake (Coelognathus subradiatus) in Baucau District, East Timor.

Coelognathus is a genus of seven species of rat snakes in the subfamily Colubrinae of the family Colubridae. The species, which are native to South Asia and Southeast Asia, were formerly assigned to the genus Elaphe. Based on morphological evidence and protein similarities, in 2001, Helfenberger revalidated the name Coelognathus that had originally been proposed by Leopold Fitzinger in 1843. The distinction between Coelognathus and Elaphe was further supported by mitochondrial DNA sequence and additional morphological evidence in 2005.

== Species ==
These species are recognized as being valid:

- Coelognathus enganensis (Vinciguerra, 1892)
- Coelognathus erythrurus (A.M.C. Duméril, Bibron & A.H.A. Duméril, 1854) – Philippine rat snake
- Coelognathus flavolineatus (Schlegel, 1837) – yellow-striped rat snake
- Coelognathus helena (Daudin, 1803) – trinket snake
- Coelognathus philippinus (Griffin, 1909) – reddish rat snake
- Coelognathus radiatus (F. Boie, 1827) – copperhead rat snake
- Coelognathus subradiatus (Schlegel, 1837) - Indonesian rat snake

Nota bene: A binomial authority in parentheses indicates that the species was originally described in a genus other than Coelognathus.
