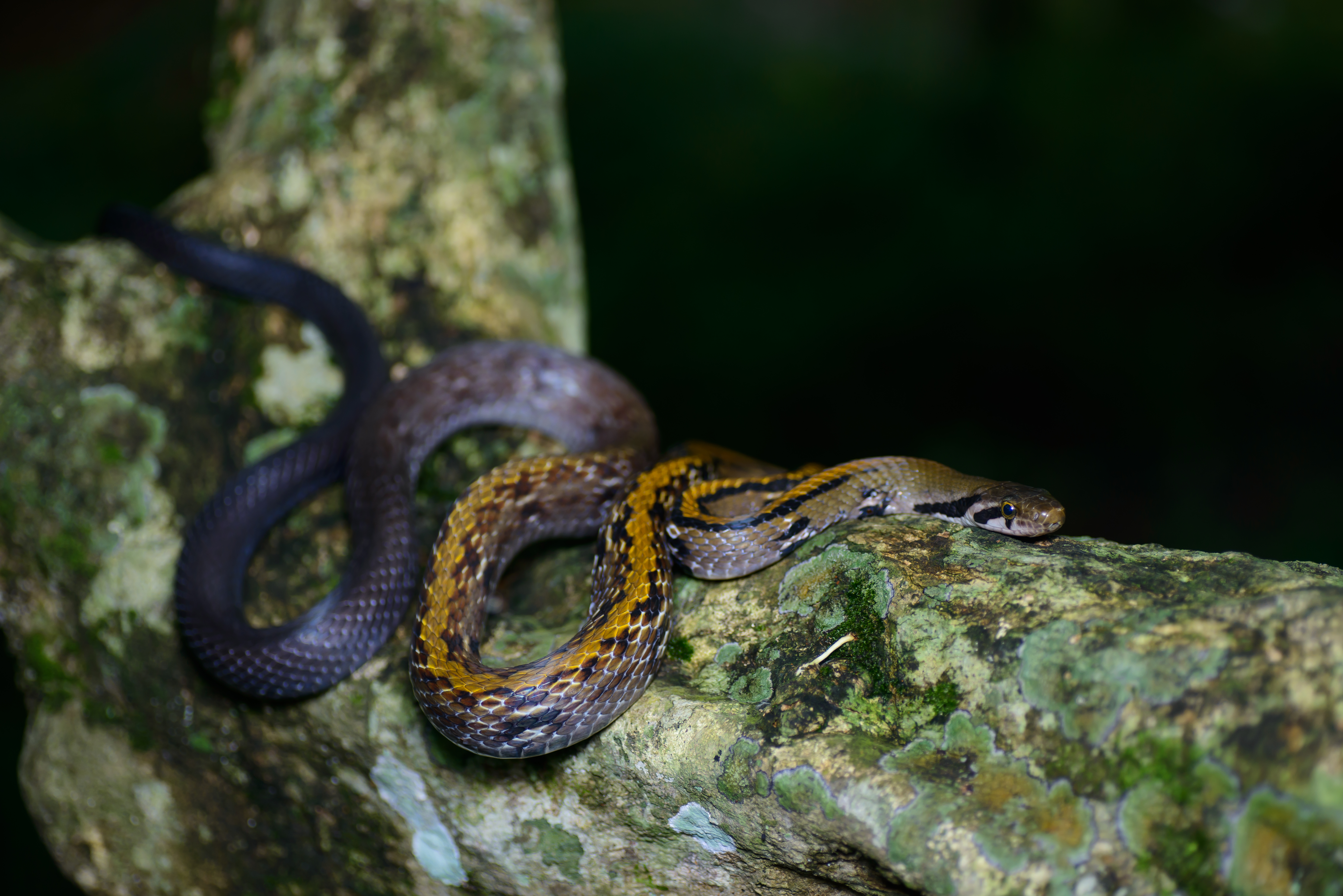

Conservation status
- Least Concern (IUCN 3.1)

Scientific classification
- Kingdom: Animalia
- Phylum: Chordata
- Class: Reptilia
- Order: Squamata
- Suborder: Serpentes
- Family: Colubridae
- Genus: Coelognathus
- Species: C. flavolineatus

Binomial name
- Coelognathus flavolineatus (Schlegel, 1837)

Synonyms
- Coluber flavolineatus Schlegel, 1837; Elaphe flavolineata

= Coelognathus flavolineatus =

Black copper rat snake

Species of snake

Coelognathus flavolineatus, the black copper rat snake or yellow striped snake, is a species of colubrid snake found in Southeast Asia. This species was previously recognized in the genus Elaphe.

== Distribution ==
- Brunei Darussalam
- Cambodia
- India (Andaman Is.)
- Indonesia (Jawa, Kalimantan, Sumatera, Bali)
- Malaysia
- Myanmar
- Singapore
- Thailand
- Vietnam
