= Coelognathus philippinus =

Scientific classification
- Kingdom: Animalia
- Phylum: Chordata
- Class: Reptilia
- Order: Squamata
- Suborder: Serpentes
- Family: Colubridae
- Genus: Coelognathus
- Species: C. philippinus

Binomial name
- Coelognathus philippinus (Griffin, 1909)

Species of snake

Coelognathus philippinus, the reddish rat snake, is a species of nonvenomous snake in the family Colubridae. The species is found in the Philippines.
