= Bengal Province =

Bengal Province or Province of Bengal, may refer to the Imperial Province of the Bengal region under two periods of imperial rule in South Asia:

- Bengal Subah (1574–1765), Province (Subah) of the Mughal Empire until 1717 and Independent State after 1717
- Bengal Presidency (1765–1947), Presidency of the British Indian Empire

== See also ==
- Islamic State – Bengal Province
- Bengal (disambiguation)
