= Nimkalay =

Nimkalay (نیم کلے )
- Town
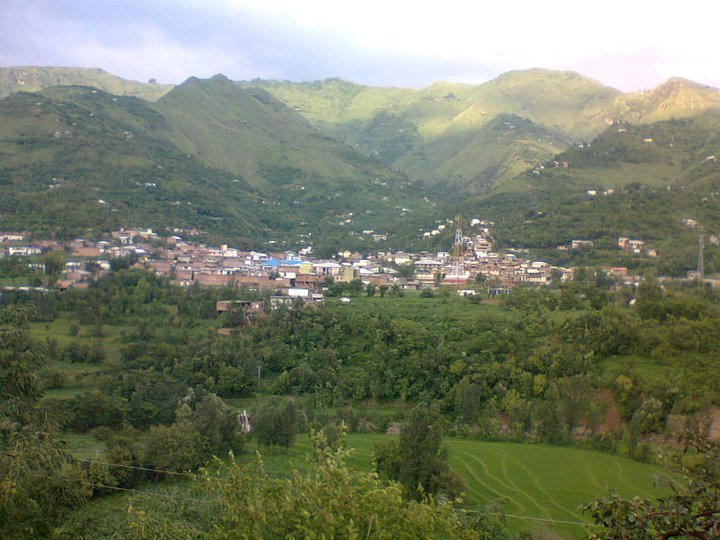
- A view of Nimkalay Town of U.C Aloch

- Location within Pakistan
- Coordinates: 34°44′N 72°41′E
- Country: Pakistan
- Province: Khyber-Pakhtunkhwa
- District: Shangla District
- Tehsil: Puran Tehsil
- Union Council: Aloch Union Council

Nimkalay (نیم کلے ) is a town of Puran Tehsil in Shangla District of Khyber-Pakhtunkhwa province of Pakistan. It is the main bazaar of Puran and a commercial place for the business community. Nimkalay is a part of the Aloch Union Council (U.C) of Puran Tehsil, located at 34°43'60N 72°40'60E and lies in the area affected by the 2005 earthquake. Most of the inhabitants of Nimkalay belong to Nangir Khel, Musa Khel, Barat Khel, Ado Khel and the Syed Miagan branches of the subtribe Babozai of the major Pathan tribe, Yousafzai. Pir Muhammad Khan (Shaheed) EX-MPA & Minister, Fazlullah Pir Muhammad Khan Ex-MPA, & Abdul Munim Ex-MPA, Abdul Maola Tehsil Nazim Puran, Tariq Ahmad Baratkhel youth MPA Pk-29, Haji Muhammad Zahid Ex-Nazim, Dr Iftikhar Ahmad Baratkhel (DMS THQ hospital Puran ) & Faizullah Yousafzai belong to Village Nimkalay.
