= Alpuri Tehsil =

Tehsil in Khyber Pakhtunkhwa, Pakistan

Alpuri Tehsil: تحصیل الپوری (Urdu); الپوري تحصیل (Pashto)
- Tehsil
- Location within Khyber Pakhtunkhwa Location within Pakistan
- Coordinates: 34°55′14″N 72°37′57″E
- Country: Pakistan
- Province: Khyber Pakhtunkhwa
- Division: Malakand
- District: Shangla

Area
  - Total: 582 km^{2} (225 sq mi)

Population (2023)
  - Total: 366,772
  - Density: 630/km^{2} (1,630/sq mi)
- Time zone: UTC+5 (PKT)

Alpuri Tehsil (Note: Urdu: تحصیل الپوری; Pashto: الپوري تحصیل) is a tehsil of Shangla District in Khyber Pakhtunkhwa, Pakistan, spanning an area of 582 square kilometres. Alpuri, the district headquarters (capital) of Shangla, is located within the tehsil. As of the 2023 Pakistani census, the population of Alpuri Tehsil was 121,279.

== History ==
In July 2022, heavy rainfall and flooding contaminated the streams of Alpuri Tehsil, causing diarrhea in over 200 people. The tehsil government declared an emergency in the tehsil's hospitals, which were overcapacity due to the outbreak.

Supporters of the Pakistan Tehreek-e-Insaf (PTI) and then–recently detained PTI leader Imran Khan held a protest in Alpuri Tehsil against the national government on 24 September 2022. The protesters called for solidarity with Khan and government action against growing inflation, particularly in regard to food and energy costs.

The Shangla Action Committee (SAC), consisting of members of Shangla District's bar association, held a protest in the main chowk (town square) of Alpuri Tehsil on 12 September 2023. The protesters called for the resignation of district deputy commissioner Hassan Abid, whom they accused of embezzlement and unprofessionalism. Officials from the Awami National Party and Jamaat-e-Islami voiced their support for the protesters' demands. Hassan responded by claiming the SAC was retaliating against him because he had launched an anti-encroachment investigation that had discovered and removed "illegal structures" created by the bar association.

== Administration and geography ==
Alpuri Tehsil is a tehsil (subdistrict) of Shangla District in the province of Khyber Pakhtunkhwa, in northwest Pakistan. It spans an area of 582 square kilometres. The town of Alpuri is the district headquarters and is located within the tehsil.

== Demographics ==
The 2023 Pakistani census recorded a population of 366,772 people in Alpuri Tehsil. The average household size was 7 people.

== See also ==
- List of tehsils of Khyber Pakhtunkhwa
