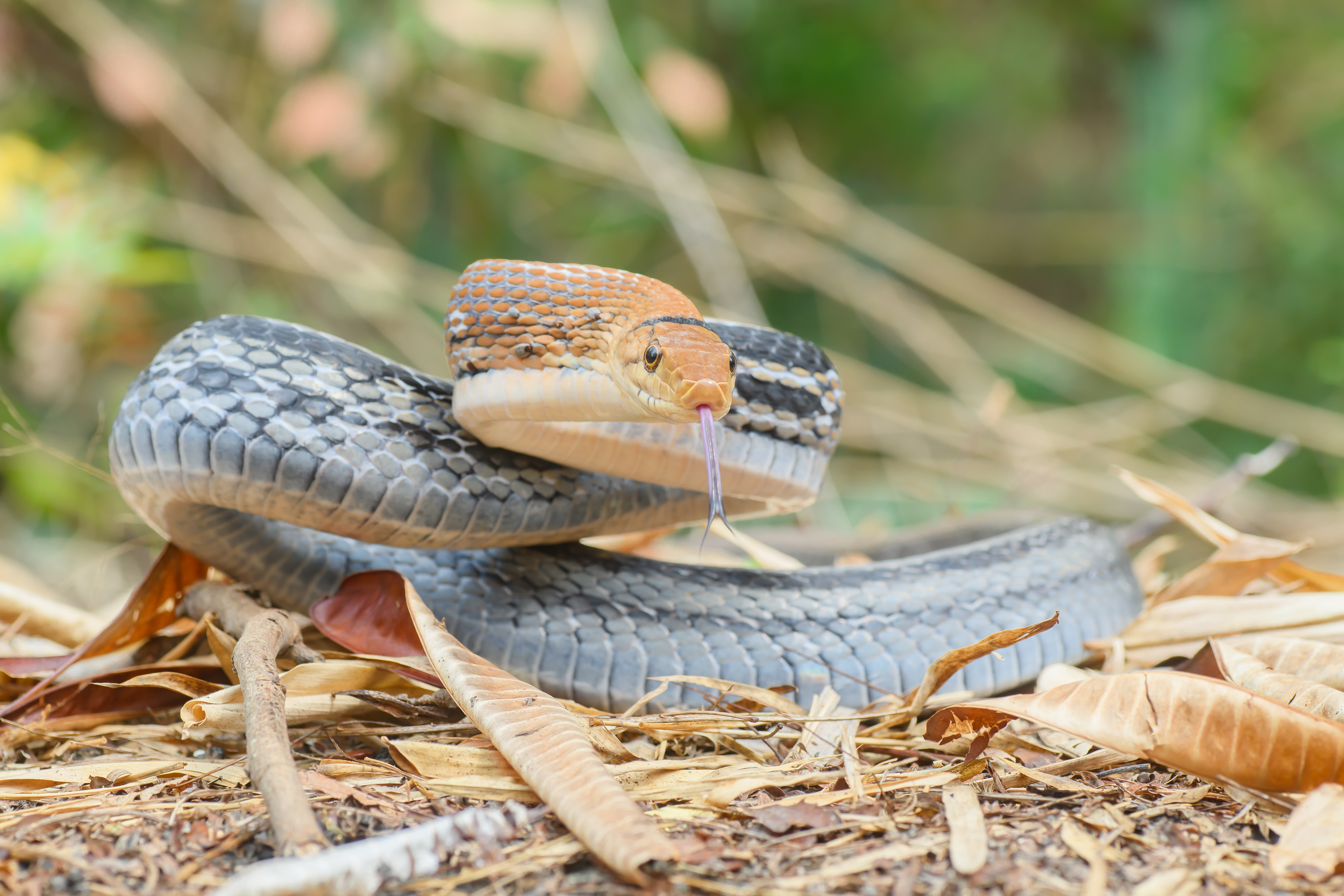
- C. radiatus in threat display

Conservation status
- Least Concern (IUCN 3.1)

Scientific classification
- Kingdom: Animalia
- Phylum: Chordata
- Class: Reptilia
- Order: Squamata
- Suborder: Serpentes
- Family: Colubridae
- Genus: Coelognathus
- Species: C. radiatus

Binomial name
- Coelognathus radiatus (F. Boie, 1827)

Synonyms
- Coluber radiatus BOIE 1827; Coluber radiatus SCHLEGEL 1837: 135; Coluber quadrifasciatus CANTOR 1839; Tropidonotus quinque CANTOR 1839; Coelognathus radiata FITZINGER 1843; Elaphis radiatus DUMÉRIL 1853; Plagiodon radiata DUMÉRIL 1853; Compsosoma radiatum DUMÉRIL, BIBRON & DUMÉRIL 1854: 292; Elaphis (Compsosoma) radiatum BLEEKER 1857; Spilotes radiatus GÜNTHER 1858; Elaphis radiatus JAN 1863; Coluber radiatus BOULENGER 1894: 61; Coluber (Compsosoma) radiatus MÜLLER 1895: 203; Coluber radiatus WALL 1908: 327; Elaphe radiata BARBOUR 1912; Elaphe radiata POPE 1929; Coelognathus radiatus COCHRAN 1930; Elaphe radiata SMITH 1943; Elaphe radiata SCHULZ 1996: 219; Elaphe radiata MANTHEY & GROSSMANN 1997: 344; Elaphe radiata COX et al. 1998: 51; Elaphe radiata LAZELL et al. 1999; Elaphe radiata CHAN-ARD et al. 1999: 166; Coelognathus radiatus GUMPRECHT 2000; Coelognathus radiatus UTIGER et al. 2002; Elaphe radiata ZIEGLER 2002: 231; Coelognathus radiatus WINCHELL 2003; Coelognathus radiatus GUMPRECHT 2003; Elaphe radiata PAUWELS et al. 2003; Coelognathus radiata ZIEGLER et al. 2007; Elaphe radiatus MURTHY 2010

= Radiated ratsnake =

Species of snake

Coelognathus radiatus, commonly known as the radiated ratsnake, copperhead rat snake, or copper-headed trinket snake, is a nonvenomous species of colubrid snake.

== Temperament ==
These snakes are usually defensive in nature which makes it hard to catch or control them.

== Common names ==
- German: Strahlennatter
- English:
  - Copperhead racer
  - Copperhead rat snake
  - Radiated rat snake
  - Copper-headed trinket snake
- Thai: งูทางมะพร้าว, ngu taang mapao
- Myanmar: ငန်းစောင်း
- Laos:ງູສາ
- Malay: Ular Rusuk Kerbau
- Bengali (Bangladesh): দুধরাজ (Dudhraj), আরবালি সাপ (Arbali sap)
- Vietnamese: rắn sọc dưa, rắn hổ ngựa
- Mizo: Hlaivar

== Distribution ==
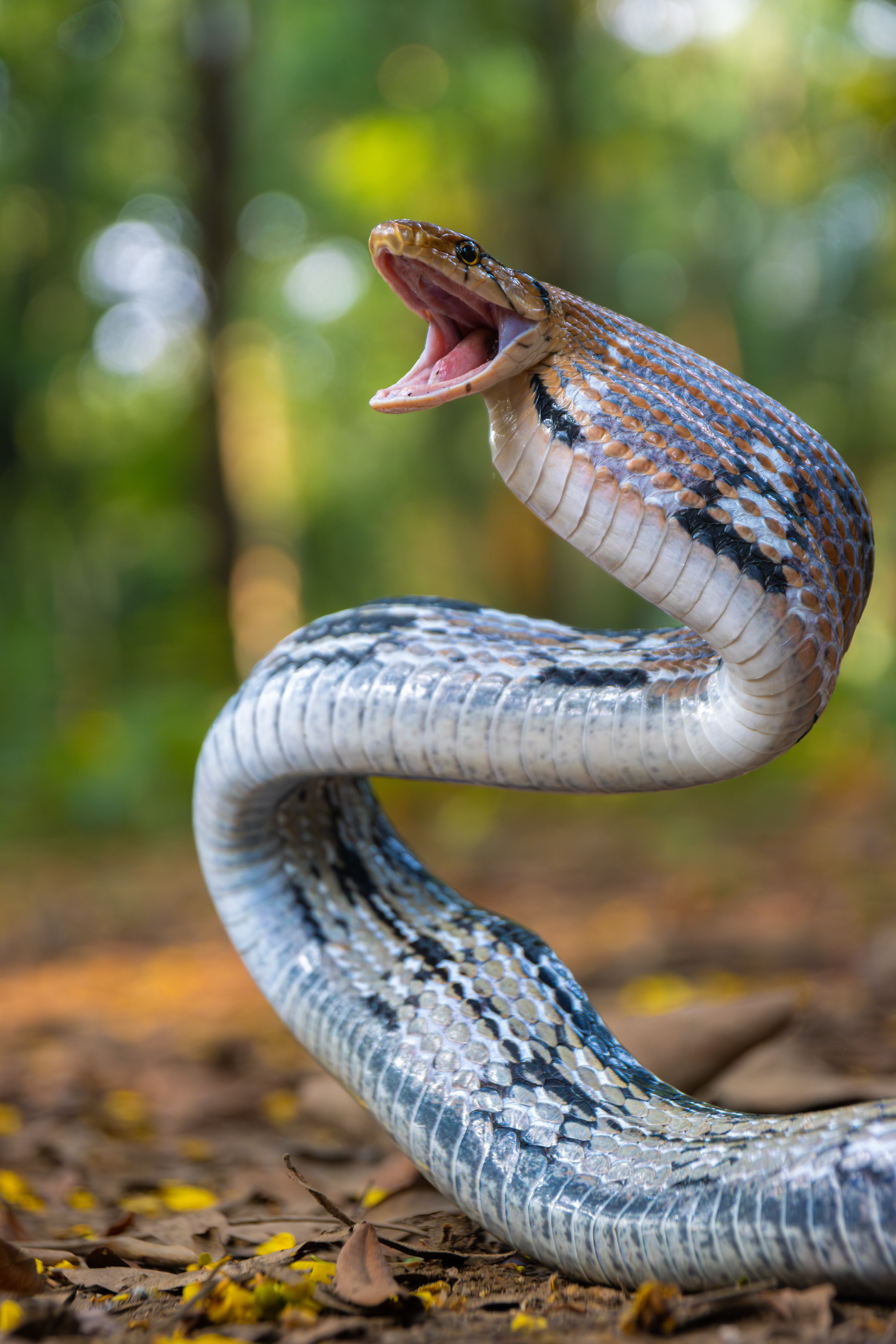
Copper-headed trinket, Nepal

- Indonesia (Sumatra, Bangka, Borneo/Kalimantan, Java), Bali
- Malaysia and Brunei (Malaya and East Malaysia); Borneo,
- Singapore Island,
- Burma (Myanmar),
- Thailand (including Phuket), Koh Phangan
- Laos, Cambodia, Vietnam,
- Japan (Ryukyu Islands),
- India (Assam, Arunachal Pradesh (Miao - Changlang district, Chessa, Chimpu, Itanagar - Papum Pare district) [A. Captain, pers. comm.]),
- Bangladesh, Nepal,
- South China (Fujian, Yunnan, Guangxi, Guangdong, Hong Kong),
- Nepal

Type locality: Java

== Sources ==
- Barbour, Thomas (1912). Some Chinese Vertebrates: Amphibia and Reptilia. Memoirs of the Museum of Comparative. Zoölogy 40 (4): 125-136
- Cantor, T. E. (1839). Spicilegium serpentium indicorum [part 1]. Proc. Zool. Soc. London 1839: 31-34
- Chan-ard, T.; Grossmann, W.; Gumprecht, A. & Schulz, K. D. (1999). Amphibians and reptiles of peninsular Malaysia and Thailand - an illustrated checklist. [bilingual English and German]. Bushmaster Publications, Würselen, Germany, 240 pp.
- Cox, Merel J.; Van Dijk, Peter Paul; Jarujin Nabhitabhata & Thirakhupt, Kumthorn (1998). A Photographic Guide to Snakes and Other Reptiles of Peninsular Malaysia, Singapore and Thailand. Ralph Curtis Publishing, 144 pp.
- David, P. & Vogel, G. (1996). The snakes of Sumatra. An annotated checklist and key with natural history notes. Bücher Kreth, Frankfurt/M.
- Duméril, ANDRÉ MARIE CONSTANT (1853). Prodrome de la classification des reptiles ophidiens. Mém. Acad. Sci., Paris, 23: 399-536
- Gumprecht, A. (2003). Anmerkungen zu den Chinesischen Kletternattern der Gattung Elaphe (sensu lato) Fitzinger 1833. Reptilia (Münster) 8 (6): 37-41
- Helfenberger, Notker (2001). Phylogenetic relationship of Old World Ratsnakes based on visceral organ topography, osteology, and allozyme variation. Russ. J. Herpetol. (Suppl.), 56 pp.
- Schmidt, D. (1983). Die Strahlennatter, Elaphe radiata (Schlegel). Elaphe 1983 (3): 33-36
- Schulz, Klaus-Dieter (1996). A monograph of the colubrid snakes of the genus Elaphe Fitzinger. Koeltz Scientific Books, 439 pp.
- Utiger, Urs, Notker Helfenberger, Beat Schätti, Catherine Schmidt, Markus Ruf and Vincent Ziswiler (2002). Molecular systematics and phylogeny of Old World and New World ratsnakes, Elaphe Auct., and related genera (Reptilia, Squamata, Colubridae). Russ. J. Herpetol. 9 (2): 105–124.
