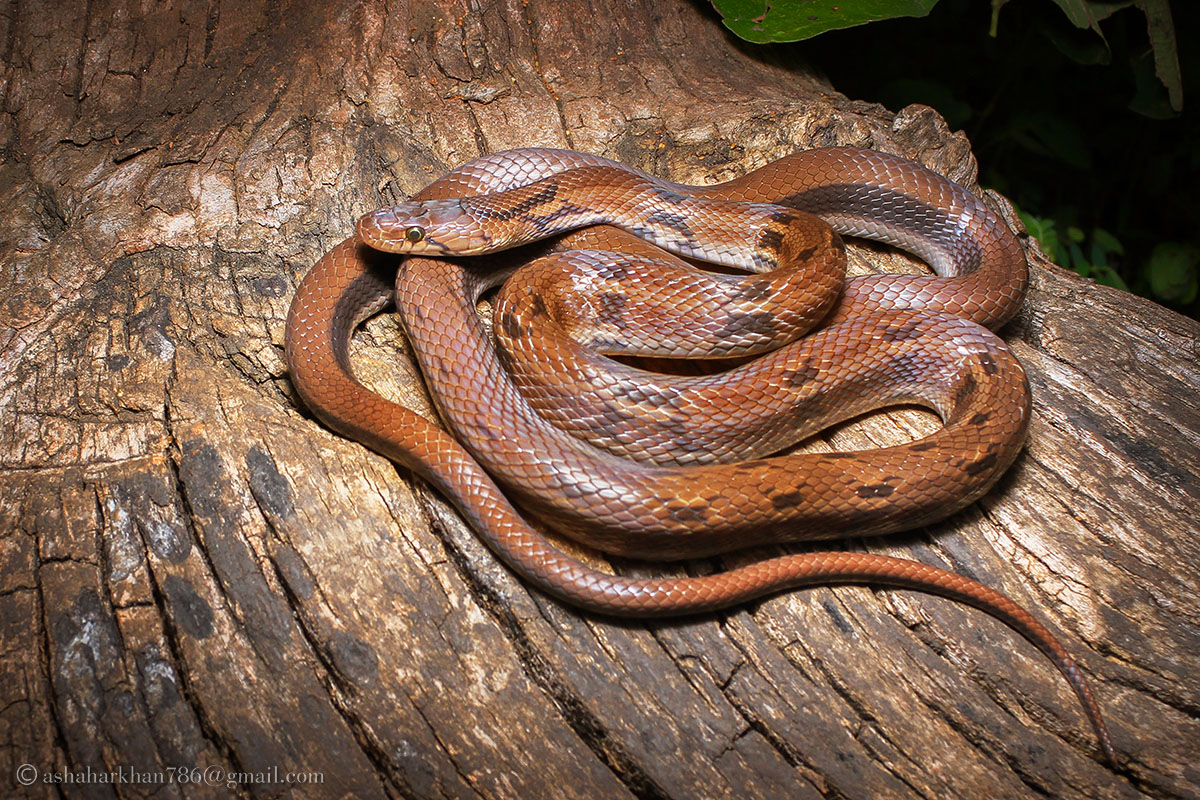
- Montane trinket snake (Coelognathus helena monticollaris)

Scientific classification
- Kingdom: Animalia
- Phylum: Chordata
- Class: Reptilia
- Order: Squamata
- Suborder: Serpentes
- Family: Colubridae
- Genus: Coelognathus
- Species: C. helena
- Subspecies: C. h. monticollaris

Trinomial name
- Coelognathus helena monticollaris (Schulz, 1992)

Synonyms
- Elaphe helena monticollaris Schulz, 1992; Coelognathus helena monticollaris — R. Whitaker & Captain, 2004

= Coelognathus helena monticollaris =

Subspecies of snake

Coelognathus helena monticollaris is subspecies of nonvenomous constricting snake in the family Colubridae. The subspecies is native to the Western ghats of India.

== Description ==
C. h. monticollaris is a narrow-headed slender snake with a beautiful colouration. The light brown body is adorned with black and white transverse stripes, unlike C. h. helena which has dark brown and white spots. The head is greenish brown with black markings. The true purpose of this colouration is camouflage. Recently, albinism has been reported in this subspecies.

== Habitat ==
The preferred habitat of C. h. monticollaris is forests, but it may frequently venture towards human habitation and occasionally enter human dwellings.

== Behaviour ==
C. h. monticollaris is diurnal and highly active. It has a very nasty temper and will strike repeatedly if molested. It never appreciates captivity and will resist capture with utmost tenacity until helplessly overpowered. Its bites are often very damaging due to its inward pointing teeth.

A 1 metre (3.3 ft) male specimen caught in Maharashtra, India (near Paud 09/16/13) whipped its tail when agitated. The same specimen was easily handled and carried around the collector's neck without incident.

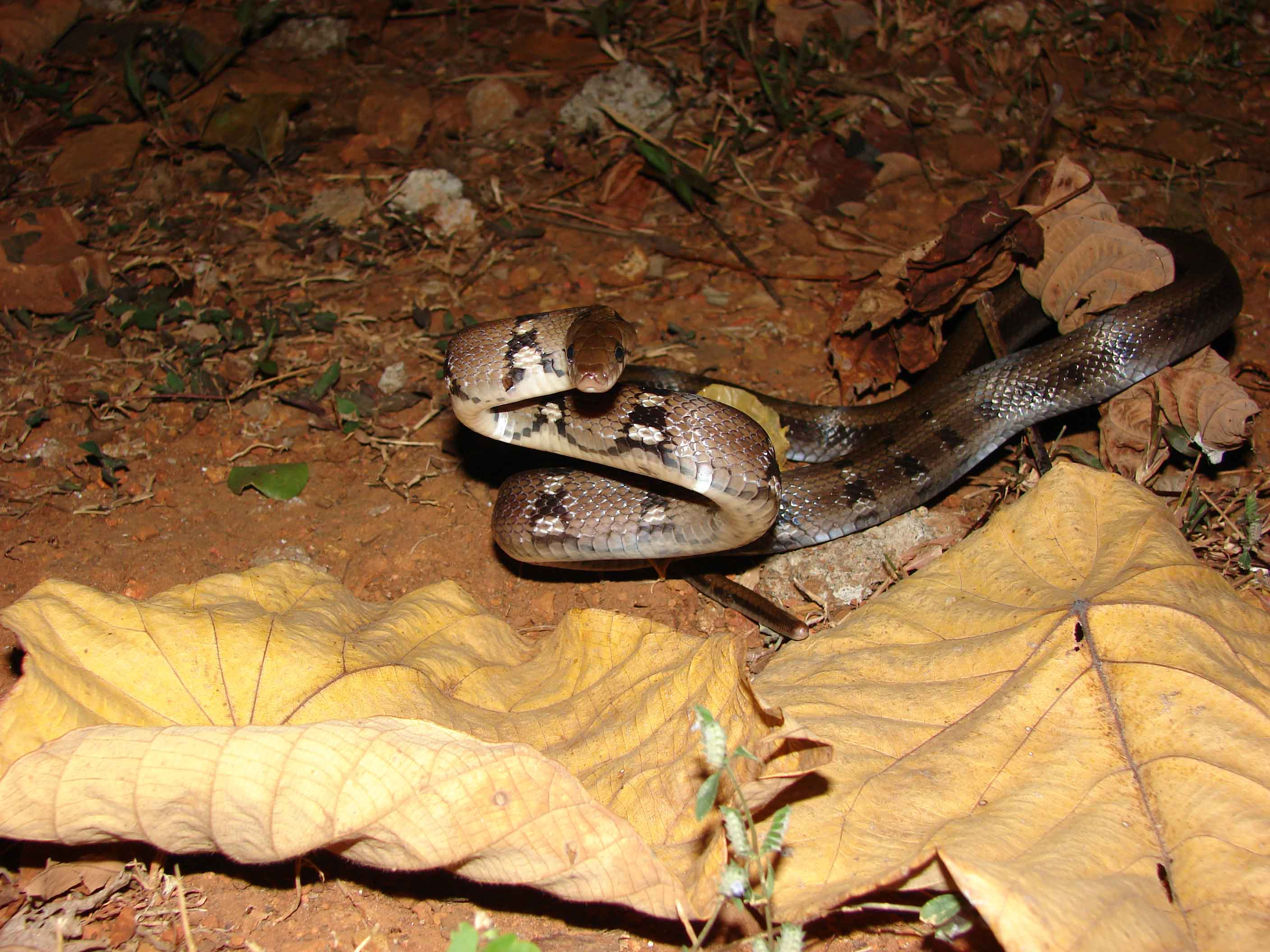
A snake exhibiting signature threat posturing

== Diet ==
C. h. monticollaris feeds mainly on small mammals. It uses its camouflage to stalk its prey and initially disorients its victim with a blitz strike. It then surrounds its prey with its coils and weakens it by biting repeatedly. The victim is finally killed by constriction and swallowed at leisure. It may also prey upon birds, frogs, lizards and other snakes as well, but shows a high preference towards small mammals. It is notorious for its voracious appetite. Captive specimens prefer mice and tend to lose interest in lizards especially if the lizards remain motionless.

== Breeding ==
Very little known about the reproductive habits of C. h. monticollaris. It is probably viviparous. Brood size unknown.

== Growth ==
The smallest known specimens of C. h. monticollaris measure around 350 mm (14 in) in total length (including tail). The average adult total length is around 1 m (3.3 ft), and the maximum is 1.5 m (4.9 ft). Females are longer than the males, while males have proportionately longer tails.

== Venom ==
C. h. monticollaris is nonvenomous. It kills instead by constriction.

== Identification ==
C. h. monticollaris may be identified by the following key characters:

- Nine supralabials of which the fifth and sixth touch the eye.
- 19 to 21 rows of dorsal scales two head lengths before the vent.
- Anal shield entire
- Nearly equally sized frontal and parietal shields.

=== Lepidosis ===
- Rostral: Compressed and touches six shields.
- Frontal: Relatively thin and elongated.
- Supraoculars: Slender and elongated being nearly as long as the frontal.
- Parietals: Each individual shield is slightly larger than the frontal.
- Prefrontals: Highly broad as well as long.
- Internasals: Touch the nostrils.
- Nasals: Divided along a vertical line on which the nostril is situated.
- Loreals: One
- Preoculars: One
- Postoculars: Divided into two equally sized shields
- Temporals: Divided into two equally sized elongated shields.
- Supralabials: Nine of which the fifth and sixth touch the eye.
- Mental: Stereotypic in form.
- Infralabials: Six of which the sixth is the largest.
- Chin shields: Anterior and posterior pairs equal in size, posterior pair separated from each other by smaller scales.
- Dorsal scales: Only the ultimate row is enlarged.
- Ventrals: 217 to 265
- Anal Shield: Entire
- Subcaudals: 74 to 97, divided.

=== Dentition ===
- Maxillary: 19 to 25
- Palatine: 10 to 14
- Pterygoid: 15 to 30
- Mandibular: 22 to 30

== Geographic range ==
C. h. monticollaris is found in the Western Ghats of India. reported from Maharashtra, Goa, Karnataka, Kerala and Tamil Nadu.
