= Makhuzai =

Human settlement in Pakistan

Makhuzai is a village and sub-tehsil in Puran Tehsil, Shangla District, Khyber Pakhtunkhwa, Pakistan.
