= East Bengal (disambiguation) =

East Bengal or Eastern Bengal may refer to:

- the eastern part of Bengal, a historical term for a region in the eastern part of the Indian subcontinent
- Eastern Bengal and Assam, a province of British India 1905–1912
- East Bengal, a province of the Dominion of Pakistan 1947–1955
- East Bengal Club, commonly referred to as East Bengal, an Indian multi-sports club
- East Bengal FC, an Indian football club
- East Bengal Regiment, an infantry regiment of the Bangladesh Army

== See also ==
- Bengal (disambiguation)
- Pakistani Bengal (disambiguation)
