= Manwan, Pakistan =

Manwan
- Location within Pakistan
- Coordinates: 34.53°N 72.39°E
- Country: Pakistan
- Province: Khyber Pakhtunkhwa
- Elevation: 2,047 m (6,716 ft)
- Time zone: UTC+5 (PST)

Manwan is a town of Shangla District in the Khyber Pakhtunkhwa province of Pakistan. It is located at 34°53′10″N 72°39′20″E and has an average elevation of 2047 metres (6719 feet).
