= Coelognathus enganensis =

Enggano rat snake

Conservation status
- Data Deficient (IUCN 3.1)

Scientific classification
- Kingdom: Animalia
- Phylum: Chordata
- Class: Reptilia
- Order: Squamata
- Suborder: Serpentes
- Family: Colubridae
- Genus: Coelognathus
- Species: C. enganensis

Binomial name
- Coelognathus enganensis (Vinciguerra, 1892)

Species of snake

Coelognathus enganensis, the Enggano rat snake, is a species of nonvenomous snake in the family Colubridae. The species is found in Enggano Island, Indonesia.
