= Kotkay =

Village in Shangla, Khyber-Pakhtunkhwa, Pakistan

Coordinates: 32°32′0″N 69°34′0″E

Kotkay or Kotkai is a small village near Aloch in the Shangla District of Khyber-Pakhtunkhwa province of Pakistan.
