= Sanila, Pakistan =

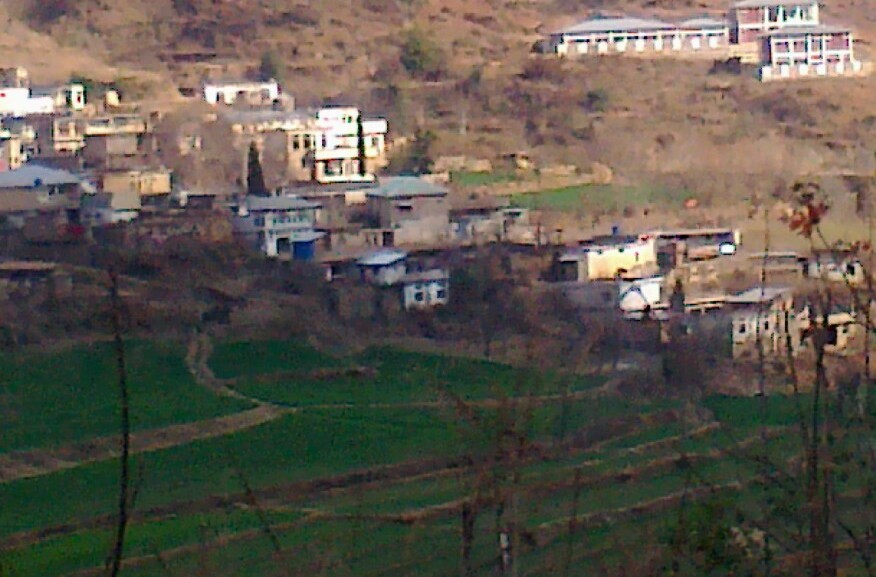
A view of Sanila Puran

Sanila is the first town to enter Tehsil Puran District Shangla in the Khyber Pakhtunkhwa Province of Pakistan. Most of the town's inhabitants belong to the Barat Khel branch of the subtribe Babozai of the major Yusufzai Pashtun tribe. Ajeem khan was the Khan of Sanila. The most famous Person of Sanila was Khurshid khan (PMLN) Shangla Ex-President and Ameer Syab khan and Dr. Ghafoor Ahmad Khan Ex-MS DHQ Hospital Alpuri Shangla & Puran Hospital , Bakht Zahir DSP.
