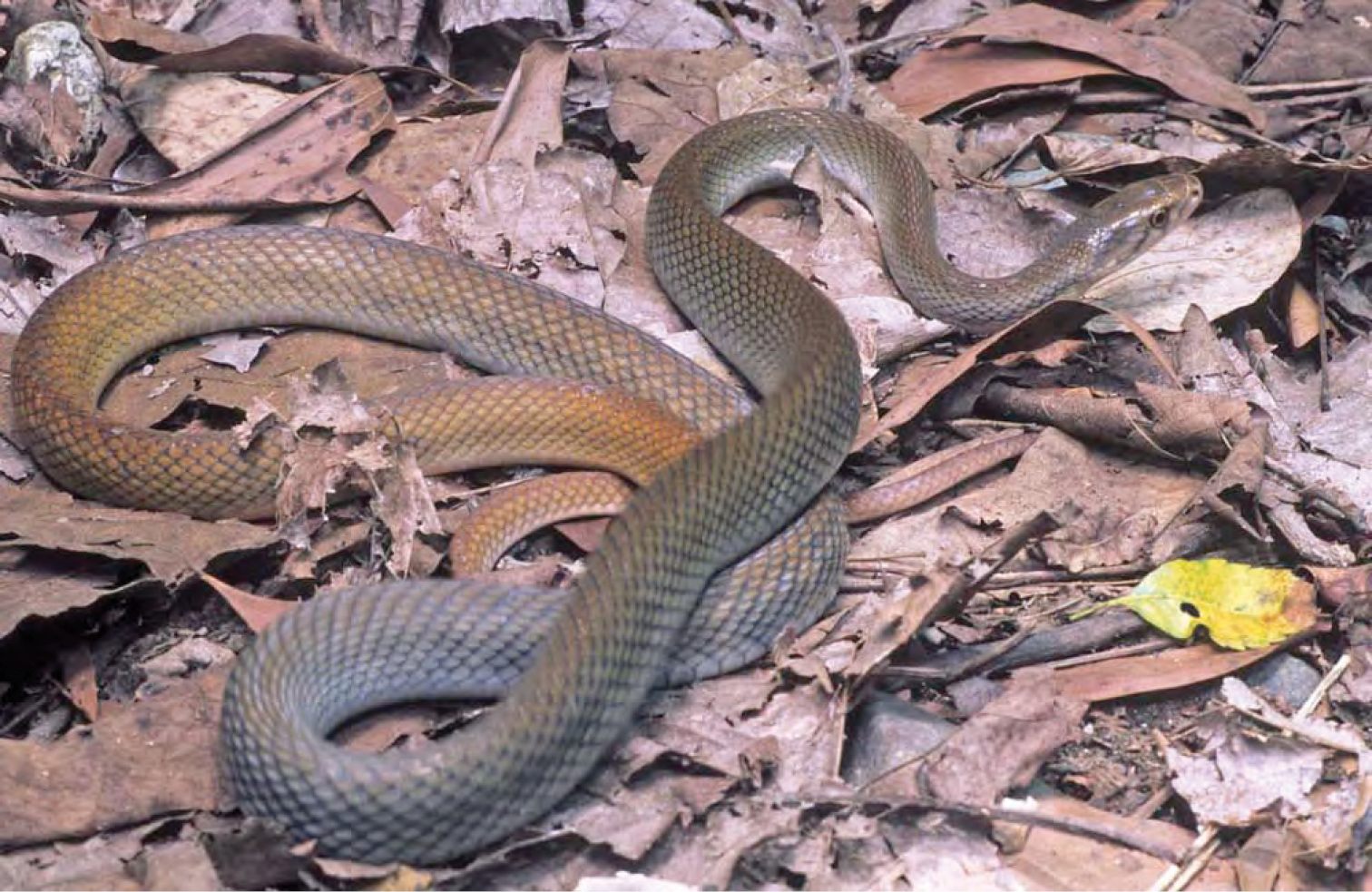
- Coelognathus erythrurus manillensis

Conservation status
- Least Concern (IUCN 3.1)

Scientific classification
- Kingdom: Animalia
- Phylum: Chordata
- Class: Reptilia
- Order: Squamata
- Suborder: Serpentes
- Family: Colubridae
- Genus: Coelognathus
- Species: C. erythrurus

Binomial name
- Coelognathus erythrurus (Duméril, Bibron & Duméril, 1854)

Synonyms
- Plagiodon erythrurus Duméril, Bibron & Duméril, 1854

= Philippine rat snake =

Species of snake

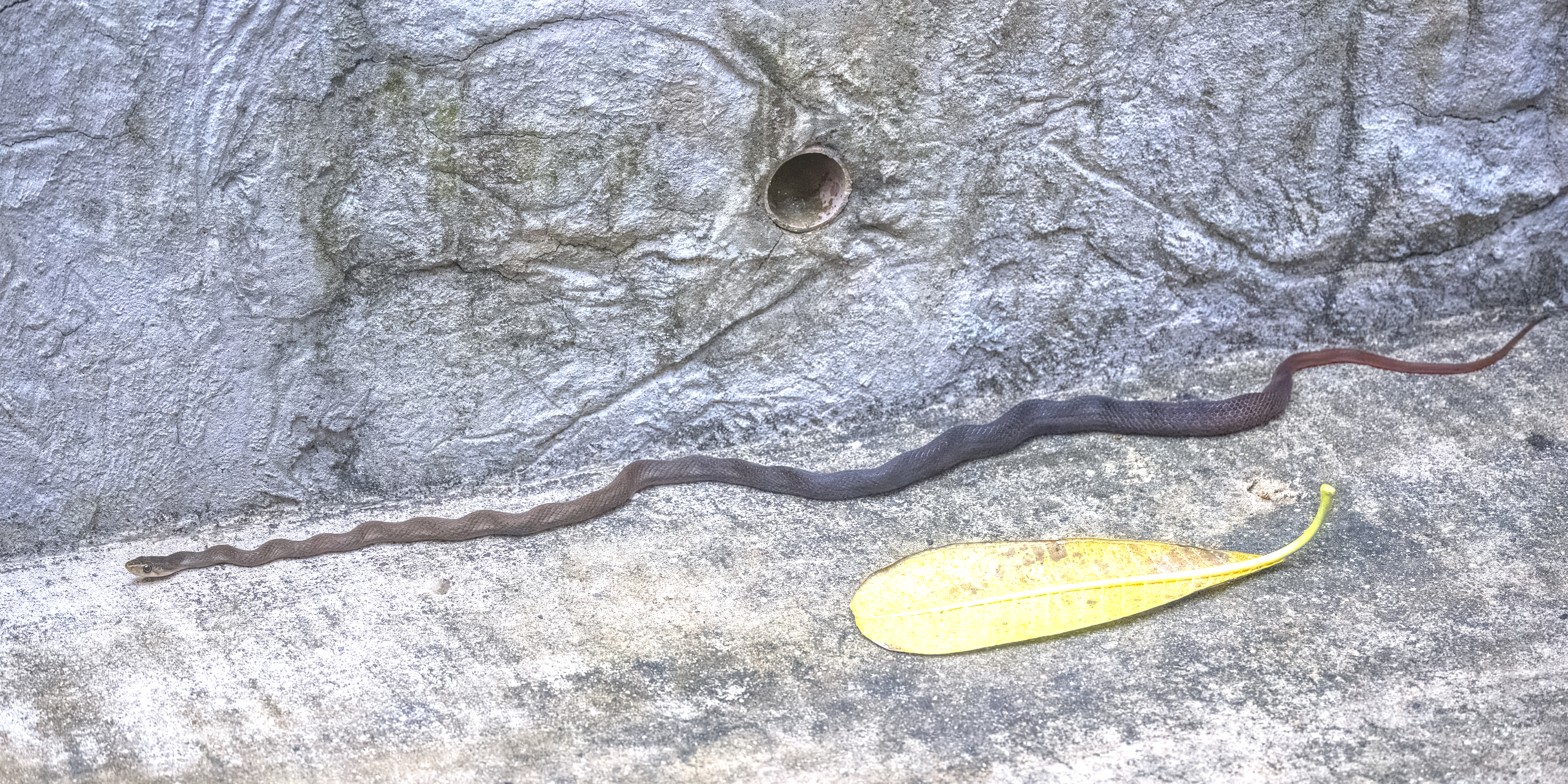
C. e. erythrurus, Panglao, Philippines

Coelognathus erythrurus, commonly known as the Philippine rat snake or huntsman snake, is a species of snake of the family Colubridae.

== Geographic range ==
The snake is found in the Philippines and Indonesia.

== Diet ==
Philippine rat snakes eat rodents.

== Subspecies ==
- Coelognathus erythrurus celebensis (Jan, 1863)
- Coelognathus erythrurus erythrurus (Duméril, Bibron & Duméril, 1854)
- Coelognathus erythrurus manillensis Jan, 1863
- Coelognathus erythrurus psephenourus Leviton, 1979
