= Puran Tehsil =

Puran Tehsil تحصیل پورَن پورَن تحصیل
- Tehsil
- Country: Pakistan
- Province: Khyber Pakhtunkhwa
- District: Shangla

Government
  - Chairman: Abdul Maula (PTI)

Population (2017)
  - Total: 145,202
- Time zone: UTC+5 (PST)
- Number of towns: 1
- Number of Union Councils: 9

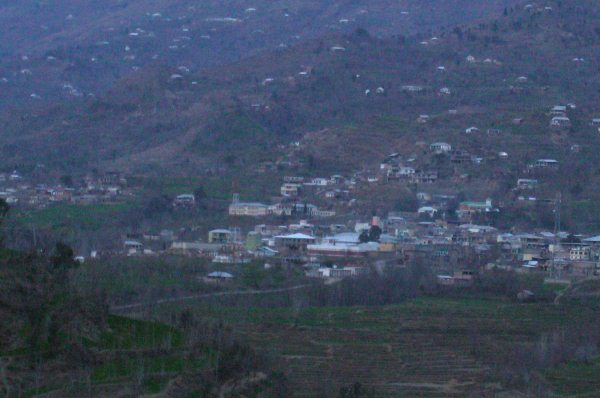
A view of Puran from village Kotkay

Puran (Urdu: پُورَن) is a sub-division and tehsil of Shangla District in Khyber-Pakhtunkhwa province of Pakistan. The subdivision includes three tehsils viz: Puran itself, Martung and Makhuzai. Puran Sub-division comprises nine Union Councils.

== Villages and settlements ==
- Puran includes the following villages and towns
- Aloch
- Bengalai
- Kotkay
- Nimkalay
- Sandovi
- Chagam
- Sanila

== Notable people ==
People from Puran include:-

- Fazlullah
- Ibadullah Khan
- Pir Muhammad Khan
- Abdul Munim
- Amir Muqam
- Faisal Zeb
