= Faisal Zeb =

Pakistani politician

Member of the Provincial Assembly of Khyber Pakhtunkhwa
- In office 13 August 2018 – 18 January 2023
- Constituency: PK-24 (Shangla-II)

Personal details
- Party: JUI (F) (2025-present)
- Other political affiliations: ANP (2018-2025)

Faisal Zeb is a Pakistani politician who had been a member of the Provincial Assembly of Khyber Pakhtunkhwa from August 2018 till January 2023.

== Political career ==
He was elected to the Provincial Assembly of Khyber Pakhtunkhwa as a candidate of the Awami National Party (ANP) from PK-24 (Shangla-II) in the 2018 Khyber Pakhtunkhwa provincial election.
