= Shangla Pass =

- Interactive map of Shangla Pass
- Location: Pakistan
- Range: Mountainous
- Coordinates: 34.8807°N 72.5909°E

Shangla Pass connects Swat District of Khyber Pakhtunkhwa, Pakistan with Shangla District, with further connections beyond to Gilgit Baltistan.
