= BENGAL (project) =

1996–98 study of the northeast Atlantic

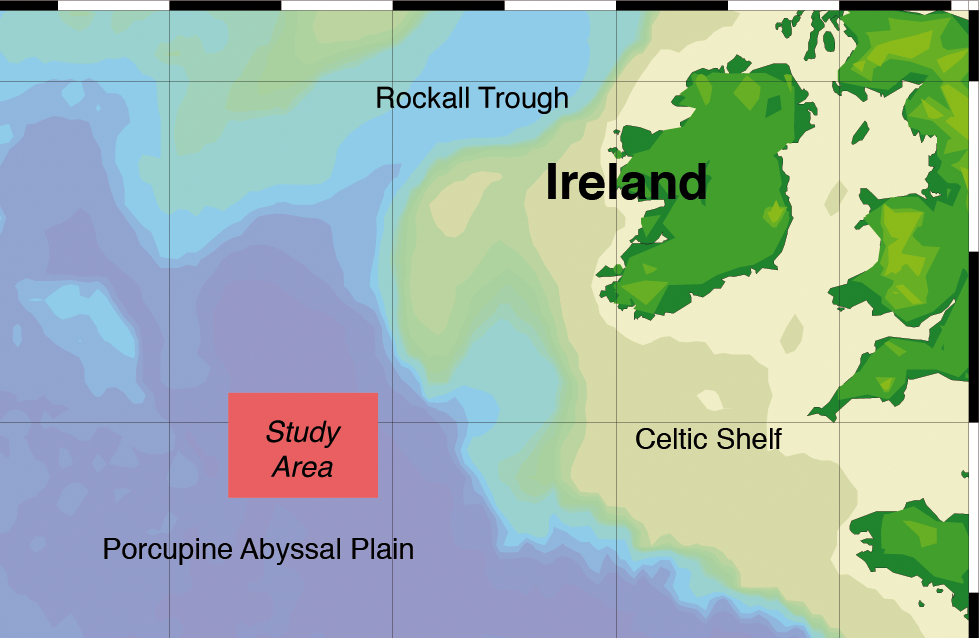
Study area in the north-east Atlantic

BENGAL was the acronym of the research project High-resolution temporal and spatial study of the BENthic biology and Geochemistry of a north-eastern Atlantic abyssal Locality. The project was funded through the EC MAST III program from 1996 to 1998 (EC contract MAS-3 950018).

The project was a three-year multidisciplinary study of the abyssal benthic boundary layer in the northeast Atlantic. The aim of BENGAL was to determine how the seabed community and the geochemistry of the sediments change seasonally in response to a highly seasonal input of organic matter from the overlying water column. It did this by organising an intensive sampling programme on 14 research cruises over a two-year period and using a range of observational techniques including time-series sediment traps, marine snow cameras, benthic lander systems, long-term moorings and time-lapse photography. The study area was located in the middle of the Porcupine Abyssal Plain at a water depth of about 4850 m, 270 km southwest of Ireland (central location: 48°50′N 16°30′W). The BENGAL project involved 17 partners from 9 European countries.
