= Pakistani Bengal =

Pakistani Bengal may refer to:

- East Bengal, a province of the Dominion of Pakistan 1947–1955
- East Pakistan, a province of Pakistan 1955–1971

== See also ==
- East Bengal (disambiguation)
