= Shang-a-Lang =

Shang-a-Lang may refer to:

- Shang-a-Lang (TV series), British TV show featuring the Bay City Rollers
- Shang-a-Lang (song), 1974 single by the Bay City Rollers
- Shang-a-Lang, a punk rock band (2007-2012) from Las Cruces, NM with releases on Razorcake Records and Silver Sprocket Bicycle Club.
- "Shang-a-lang", a 1989 song by the Doug Anthony All Stars from their album DAAS Icon
