= Aloch =

Aloch (آلوچ)
- Union council
- Location within Pakistan Location within Khyber Pakhtunkhwa
- Country: Pakistan
- Province: Khyber Pakhtunkhwa
- Tehsil: Puran
- Time zone: UTC+5
- Name of MPA: Faisal Zeb Khan

Aloch (آلوچ) is a town in Shangla District of Khyber Pakhtunkhwa included in Puran tehsil. Aloch is a commercial place for business community. Union Council Aloch is the largest Union Council of Tehsil Puran both on area and population basis. Aloch and Nimkalay comparatively have more facilities than the rest of Shangla District. The people at Aloch have almost access to all basic necessities of life and facilities at their doorsteps. They have a good hospital, Session Court, Police Setup, Schools and Colleges for both men and women, NADRA Office, Banks etc. within Aloch. Most of the inhabitants of Aloch belong to Abakhel branch of the subtribe Babozai of the major Pathan tribe Yousafzai. Haji Muhammad Zahid was Ex-Nazim of U.C Aloch.

It lies in the area affected by the 2005 earthquake.

== Climate ==
The average annual temperature in aloch is 18.5 °C, while the annual precipitation averages 885 mm. November is the driest month with 21 mm of precipitation, while August, the wettest month, has an average precipitation of 135 mm.

June is the hottest month of the year with an average temperature of 30.1 °C. The coldest month January has an average temperature of 7.6 °C.
