= Bangles =

Bangles may refer to:

- Bangle, jewellery
- The Bangles, an American pop rock band
- Bangles (EP), a 1982 EP by the Bangles
- Bangles (film), a 2013 Indian Malayalam-language film

== See also ==
- "Baubles, Bangles, & Beads", a song from the 1953 musical Kismet
- Chris Bangle (born 1956), American automobile designer
- Chura (bangles)
