= Nawan Killi, Mardan =

MAYAR مایار
- Village
- Nickname: MAYAR
- Motto: Khapl Kali
- Location within Pakistan
- Coordinates: 34°09′49″N 72°05′01″E
- Country: Pakistan
- Province: Khyber Pakhtunkhwa
- Districts of Pakistan: Mardan
- Elevation: 291 m (955 ft)
- Postal code: 23290
- Area code: 23200

Nawan Killi is a village and union council in Mardan District of Khyber Pakhtunkhwa. It has an altitude of 291 m (958 feet).
