= Bengala (wrestler) =

Bengala (wrestler) is a ring name used by several Mexican professional wrestlers

- Bengala (CMLL), masked wrestler working for Consejo Mundial de Lucha Libre, real name unrevealed
- Ricky Marvin, the first person to use the ring name "Bengala" for Lucha Libre AAA Worldwide (AAA) 2014–2016
- Súper Nova, second wrestler to work as "Bengala" for AAA, used the name 2016–2019.
- Arkángel Divino, third wrestler to work as Bengala in AAA, made his debut under the name in September 2019
- El Halcón, used the name 1969–1970
- Canelo Casas, used the name early in his career from 2006
