= Frank Bengel =

German university teacher

Frank Michael Bengel
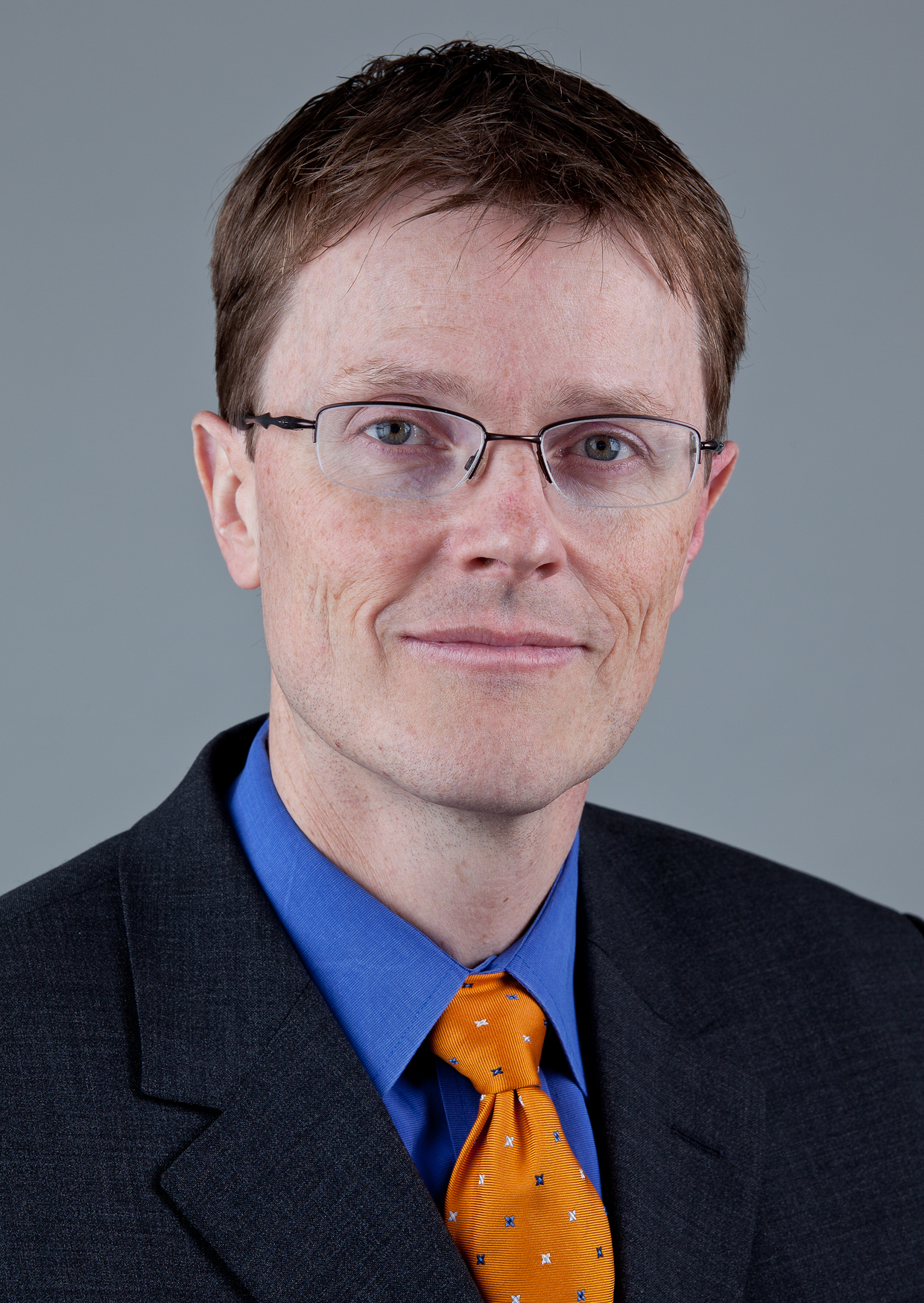
- Born: 14 August 1969 (age 57); Würzburg
- Known for: Noninvasive Medical Imaging
- Scientific career
- Fields: Nuclear Medicine
- Workplaces: Hannover Medical School.

Frank Michael Bengel (born 14 August 1969 in Würzburg) is a German professor and nuclear medicine physician. He is the current director of the Department of Nuclear Medicine at the Hannover Medical School.

== Biography ==
Bengel studied human medicine from 1988 to 1995 and received his doctoral degree at the University of Erlangen-Nuremberg. He completed his specialty training in nuclear medicine at the Department of Nuclear Medicine of the Technical University of Munich in 2000. He received the venia legendi (habilitation) for nuclear medicine at the Technical University of Munich in 2002. Bengel was then recruited by the Johns Hopkins University, Baltimore, MD, USA, where he served as an associate professor of radiology and medicine and as the director of Cardiovascular Nuclear Medicine from 2005 to 2010. He then accepted a professorship and the position as director of Nuclear Medicine at the Hannover Medical School where he started in January 2011.

Bengel published numerous original articles and reviews in scientific journals, as well as book chapters.

== Research ==
Bengel's main research focus is the application of noninvasive imaging techniques for the assessment of functional mechanisms in the body (especially in the cardiovascular system). He advanced nuclear imaging techniques targeting blood flow, metabolism and autonomic nervous system of the heart. He also introduced novel techniques for imaging of gene expression and for tracking of stem cells in the heart. Rapid translation of novel tests from research to patient care is at the center of his work, in order to facilitate early disease detection and to refine the choice of therapy.

== Functions in scientific organisations ==
Bengel holds or held the following positions in international scientific organisations:

- Associate Editor: Journal of Nuclear Medicine (since 2017), European Heart Journal – Cardiovascular Imaging (since 2013), Nuclear medicine (2010-2017)
- Editorial board member: Journal of the American College of Cardiology (2011–2015), Circulation – Cardiovascular Imaging (since 2008), JACC – Cardiovascular Imaging (since 2007), European Journal of Nuclear Medicine and Molecular Imaging (since 2004), Journal of Nuclear Cardiology (since 2004)
- President, Cardiovascular Council, Society of Nuclear Medicine and Molecular Imaging (SNMMI) (2009/2010)
- Chair, Cardiovascular Committee, European Association of Nuclear Medicine (EANM) (2004–2008)
- Chair, Working Group Nuclear Cardiology, Deutsche Gesellschaft für Kardiologie (DGK) (2006–2010)
- Fellow of the American Heart Association (2012)
- Board of directors, American Society of Nuclear Cardiology (ASNC) (2006–2010) and Deutsche Gesellschaft für Nuklearmedizin (DGN) (2013–2016)
- Chairman of the annual meeting of the Deutsche Gesellschaft für Nuklearmedizin (DGN) 2015
- Board of directors and president-elect, Deutsche Gesellschaft für Nuklearmedizin (DGN) since 2024

== Honors and awards ==
- 2002 – Tyco Healthcare Research Award and Brahms Research Award of the Deutsche Gesellschaft für Nuklearmedizin
- 2011 – Hermann Blumgart Award of the Society of Nuclear Medicine and Molecular Imaging
- 2013 – Simon Dack Award of the American College of Cardiology
- 2014 – Zaret/Beller Award of the American Society of Nuclear Cardiology
