= Chakesar =

Pakistani town

Coordinates: 34.783778°N 72.766913°E

Chakesar Tehsil تحصیل چکیسر چکېسر تحصیل
- Tehsil and village
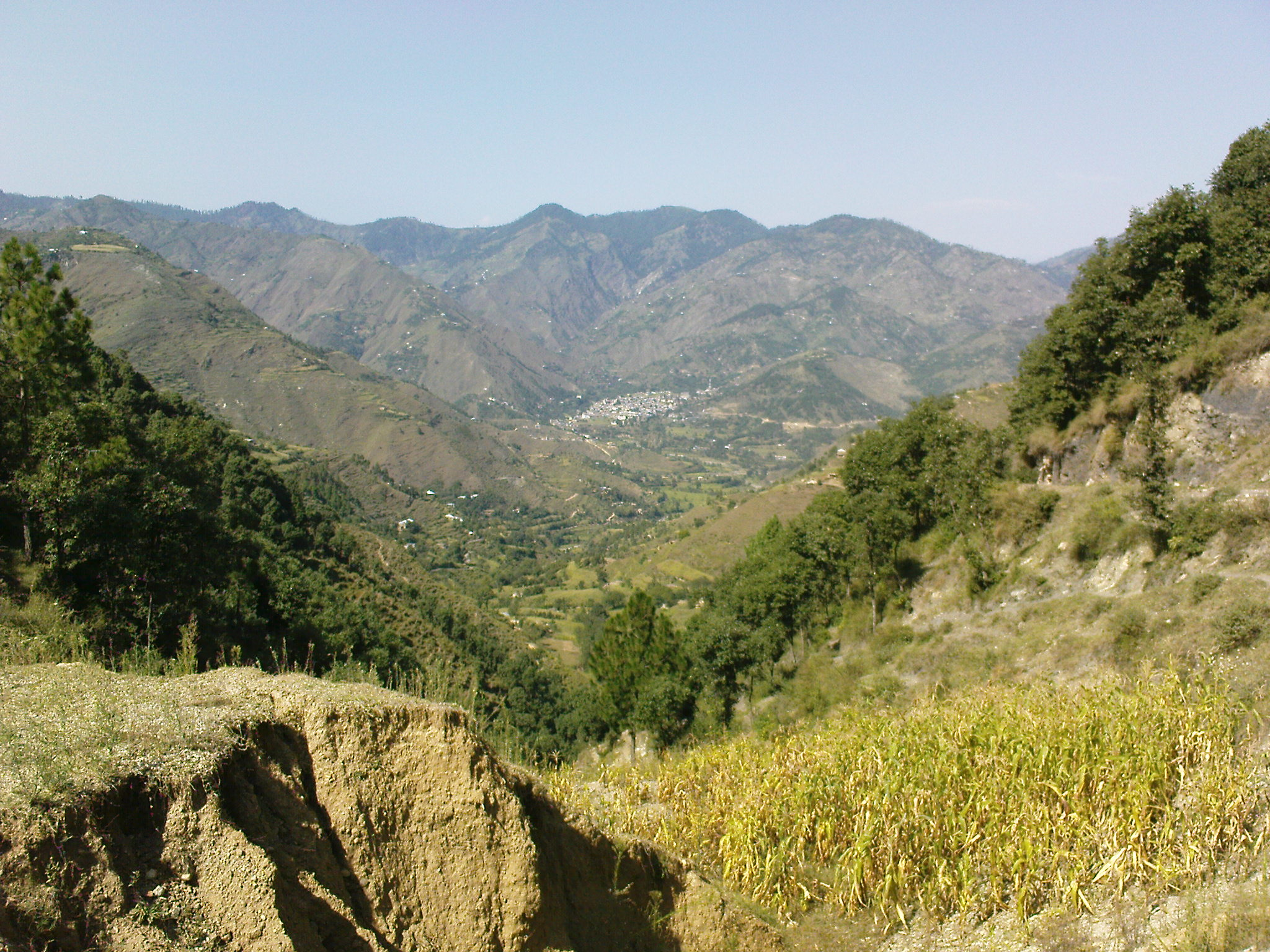
- Interactive map of Chakesar Tehsil
- Country: Pakistan

Chakesar is a town and tehsil of the Shangla District in Khyber-Pakhtunkhwa province of Pakistan. It is situated about 6 km in the north-west on the right bank of the Indus River.

== Geography ==
=== Topography ===
Chakesar is a tehsil in district Shangla, located between 34° 47′ 8′′ N and 72° 46′ 11′′ E, with an altitude of 3722 feet. Tehsil Chakesar is enclosed to the north-west by Alpuri, to the south by tehsil Martung, to the north-west by tehsil Puran, and to the east by tehsil Besham. Chakesar valley is in the Sino Japanese region and reaches to the basin of the Saharo Sindian region.

Surrounding Chakesar are many mountains and valley. The weather in the region is moderate in summer and cold in winter. The mercury goes a few degrees below the freezing point in December, January and February. People mainly burn wood and LPG for their household cooking and warming their houses. Rapid deforestation is thus a problem of this area right now and will be a great issue in the near future.

== Animal Fauna ==
In recent research article, a new distribution record for Idricerus decrepitus from Chakesar Shangla has been reported

=== Birds ===
The avian fauna of Chakesar Valley, Shangla, was explored from March 2019 to March 2022. The result yielded a total of 38 bird species belonging to 20 families under the orders Passeriformes, Columbiformes, Coraciiformes, and Accipitriformes. Order Passeriformes, representing 34 species in 17 families, are Acridotheres tristis (L), A. fuscus (Wagler), Sturnia pagodarum (Gmelin), Passer domesticus, P. montanus (L), Pycnonotus leucogenys (L), P. cafer (Grey), and Hypsipetes leucocephalus (Gmelin). Phylloscopus xanthoschist (Grey & Grey), Phylloscopus sp., Terpsiphone paradisi (L.), Motacilla cinerea (Tunstall), M. alba (L.), Oriolus kundoo (Sykes), Emberiza lathami (Grey), Phoenicurus fuliginous (Vigors), P. leucocephalus (Vigors), Copsychus saularis (L.), Eumyias thalassinus (Swainson), Saxicola maurus (Pallas), Saxicola caprata (Linnaeus), Hirundo rustica (L.), Cecropis daurica (Laxmann), Hirundo smithii (Leach), Dicrurus macrocercus (Vieillot), Corvus splendens (Vieillot), C. macrorhynchos (Wagler), Dendrocitta vagabunda (Latham), Parus cinereus (Vieillot), Lanius schach (L.), Chloris spinoides (Vigors), Prinia crinigera (Hodgson), and Lonchura punctulate (L.) Two species, Halcyon smyrnensis (L.) and Alcedo atthis (L.), represented the order Coraciiformes, while Spilopelia senegalensis (L.) and Gyps himalayensis (Hume) represented the orders Columbiformes and Accipitriformes, respectively. Emberiza lathami was rarely sighted. All reported species are new for the area.
