= Alpuri =

City in Khyber-Pakhtunkhwa, Pakistan

- Location within Pakistan
- Coordinates: 34.54°N 72.39°E
- Country: Pakistan
- Province: Khyber-Pakhtunkhwa
- Elevation: 1,587 m (5,207 ft)
- Time zone: UTC+5 (PST)

Alpuri (Urdu: الپوری, Pashto: الپوری) is the capital of Shangla District in the Khyber-Pakhtunkhwa province of Pakistan. It is located at 34°54′00″N 72°39′00″E and has an average elevation of 1587 meters. The place has a government degree college and District headquarters hospital. District police officer, deputy commissioner and various offices are also located here. It is famous for its cold weather in summer and snow fall in winter. For local people it is the hub of healthcare as it has a district headquarter hospital and multiple private hospitals such as Mansoor doctors' hospital.

== Education ==
Currently, there are currently two government colleges, which provide education at intermediate level.

== Climate ==
With a mild and generally warm and temperate climate, Alpuri features a humid subtropical climate (Cfa) under the Köppen climate classification. The average temperature in Alpuri is 15.8 °C, while the annual precipitation averages 1040 mm. Even in the driest months, there is a lot of precipitation. November is the driest month with 25 mm of precipitation, while July, the wettest month, has an average precipitation of 155 mm.

July is the hottest month of the year with an average temperature of 25.4 °C. The coldest month January has an average temperature of 4.5 °C.

Climate data for Alpuri
Month	Jan	Feb	Mar	Apr	May	Jun	Jul	Aug	Sep	Oct	Nov	Dec	Year
Mean daily maximum °C (°F)	8.6 (47.5)	10.4 (50.7)	15.3 (59.5)	20.8 (69.4)	26.2 (79.2)	32.1 (89.8)	31.6 (88.9)	30.0 (86.0)	28.0 (82.4)	23.8 (74.8)	18.1 (64.6)	11.3 (52.3)	21.3 (70.4)
Daily mean °C (°F)	4.5 (40.1)	6.0 (42.8)	10.3 (50.5)	15.3 (59.5)	20.0 (68.0)	25.3 (77.5)	25.4 (77.7)	24.3 (75.7)	21.8 (71.2)	17.3 (63.1)	12.2 (54.0)	6.8 (44.2)	15.8 (60.4)
Mean daily minimum °C (°F)	0.4 (32.7)	1.6 (34.9)	5.4 (41.7)	9.9 (49.8)	13.8 (56.8)	18.5 (65.3)	19.9 (67.8)	18.6 (65.5)	15.6 (60.1)	10.9 (51.6)	6.3 (43.3)	2.3 (36.1)	10.3 (50.5)
Source: Climate-Data.org

== 2007 fighting ==
On 13 November 2007 militants of the Tehreek-e-Nafaz-e-Shariat-e-Mohammadi ("Movement for the Enforcement of Sharia") from neighbouring Swat were reported to have captured Alpuri district headquarters. This seems to have been part of a general push into Shangla District. The local police fled without resisting the advancing militant force which, in addition to local militants, also included Uzbek, Tajik and Chechen volunteers.

The militants vacated the town again on November 22/23, with government troops approaching. Fighting in Matta and Kabal areas of Swat and parts of Malakand continued, and the Alpuri area was by and large cut off from the outside. The militants' offensive was so unexpected that residents in Shangla were reporting food shortages, as they had no time to stock up on supplies.

== 2009 Alpuri Bombing ==
On 12th Oct 2009, a serious suicide bomb blast caused 47 deaths in this village.
