= Shangla District =

Shangla District ضلع شانگلہ شنګله ولسوالۍ
- District of Khyber Pakhtunkhwa
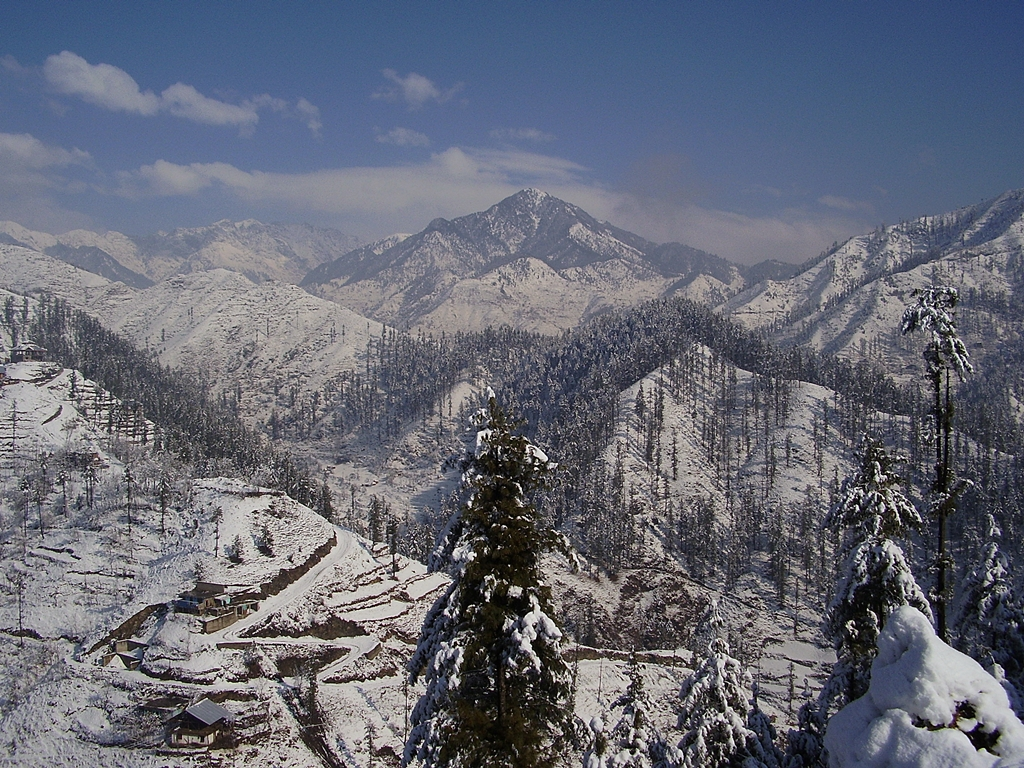
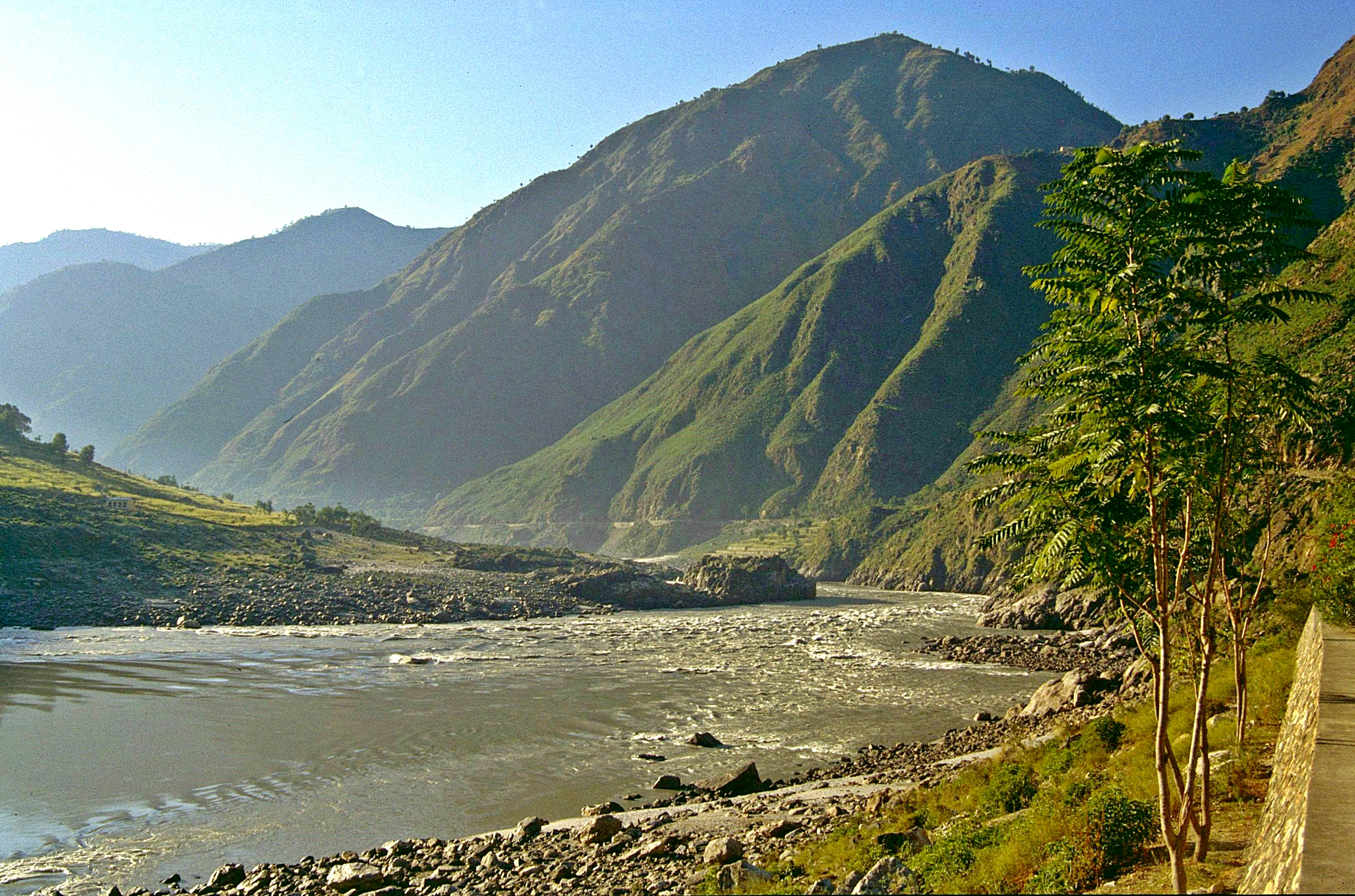
- Top: Shangla Top; Bottom: Road near Besham

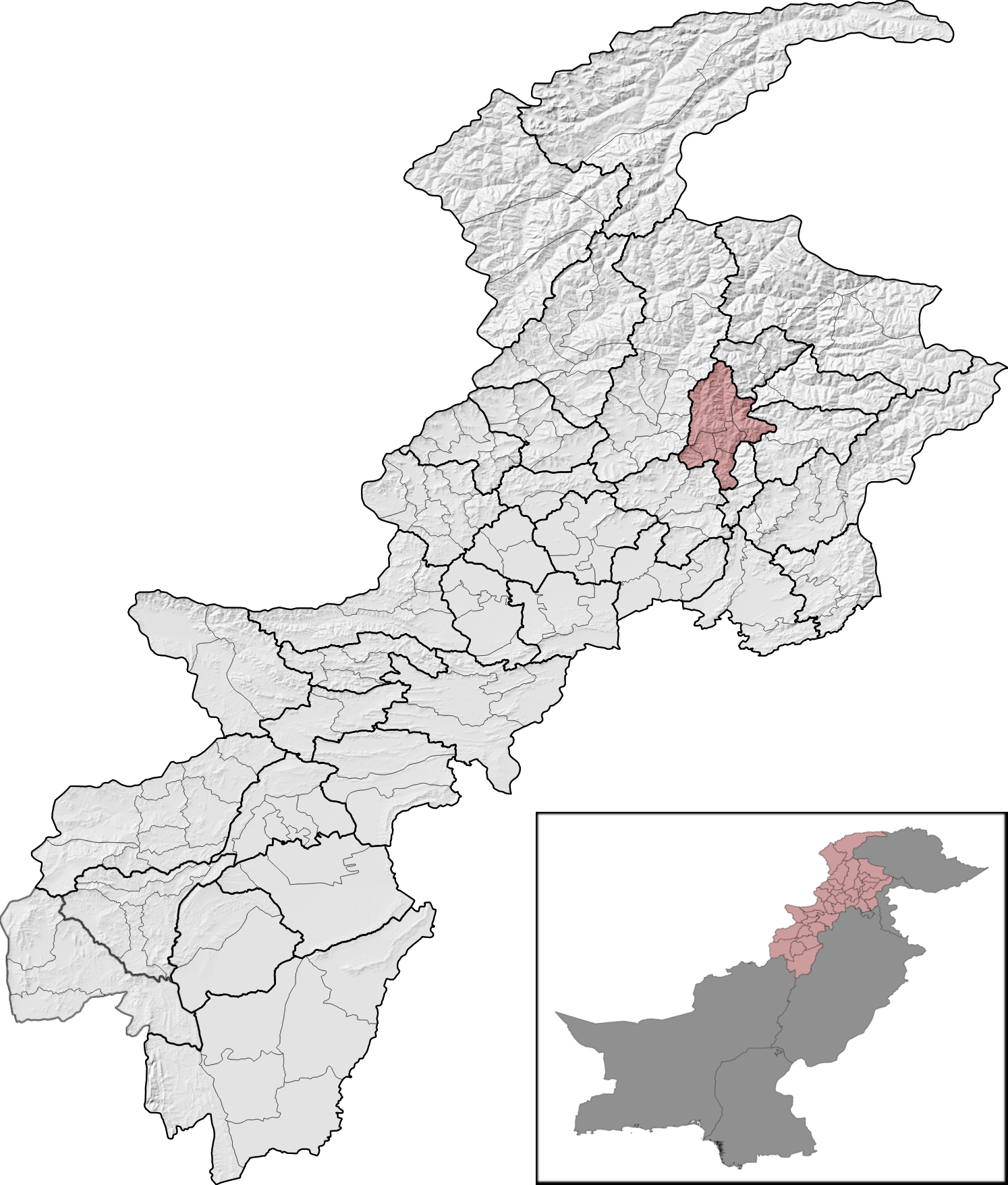
- Shangla District (red) in Khyber Pakhtunkhwa
- Country: Pakistan
- Province: Khyber Pakhtunkhwa
- Division: Malakand
- Headquarters: Alpuri

Government
  - Type: District Administration
  - Deputy Commissioner: N/A
  - District Police Officer: N/A
  - District Health Officer: N/A

Area
  - District of Khyber Pakhtunkhwa: 1,586 km^{2} (612 sq mi)

Population (2023)
  - District of Khyber Pakhtunkhwa: 891,252
  - Density: 561.9/km^{2} (1,455/sq mi)
  - Urban: 0
  - Rural: 891,252

Literacy
  - Literacy rate: Total: 33.74%; Male: 48.82%; Female: 17.82%
- Time zone: UTC+5 (PST)
- District Council: 28 seats
- Number of Tehsils: 5
- Website: shangla.kp.gov.pk

Shangla District (Pashto: شنګله ولسوالۍ, Urdu: ضلع شانگلہ) is a district in Malakand Division of Khyber Pakhtunkhwa, Pakistan. The district's headquarters are located at Alpuri. The district was established in 1995, having previously been a subdivision of Swat District. The total area of the district is 1,586 square kilometers. Shangla comprises five subdivisions, Alpuri, Puran, Chakesar, Martung and Besham tehsils.

== Location ==
The district is bounded in the north by Kohistan District, in the east by Battagram District and Torghar District, in the west by Swat District, and in the south by Buner District.

== Administrative divisions ==
Tehsil	Name (Urdu) (Pashto)	Area (km^{2})	Pop. (2023)	Density (ppl/km^{2}) (2023)	Literacy rate (2023)	Union Councils
Alpuri Tehsil	(Urdu: تحصیل الپوری)(Pashto: الپوري تحصیل)	582	366,772	630.19	38.26%	
Bisham Tehsil	(Urdu: تحصیل بشام)(Pashto: بشام تحصیل)	184	121,279	659.13	34.77%	
Chakesar Tehsil	(Urdu: تحصیل چکیسر)(Pashto: چکېسر تحصیل)	335	128,238	382.8	26.08%	
Martung Tehsil	(Urdu: تحصیل مارتونگ)(Pashto: مارتونګ تحصیل)	188	103,205	548.96	24.01%	
Makhuzai Tehsil		...	...	...	...	
Shahpur Tehsil		...	...	...	...	
Puran Tehsil	(Urdu: تحصیل پورَن)(Pashto: پورَن تحصیل)	297	171,758	578.31	35.11%	

== History ==
Shangla was a sub-division of the Swat district in the Khyber Pakhtunkhwa province of Pakistan until it was granted the status of a separate district in 1995. This was primarily due to the efforts of Haji Badi uz Zaman, a political leader and community figure who was assassinated in 1994, and his son, Afsar ul Mulk.

There are relics of the ancient Greek period at Pirsar, Chakesar and Daut. It is believed that Alexander the Great camped at Pirsar for a few days. There are also relics of the Hindu Shahi in Olandar-Ajmair.

A number of Buddha sculptures are also found in Shangla district which indicate that Shangla was also a part of the previous Buddhist civilization.

The district was hit by the 2015 Hindu Kush earthquake in which more than 18 people were killed.

== Geography ==
Shangla district consists of small valleys and is situated between the hillocks and is surrounded by high mountains full of forests comprising Pindrow Fir, Morinda Spruce, Blue Pine (Kail), Chir Pine and Deodar Cedar trees. The average elevation of the district is 2000 to 3000 meters above sea level. The highest point (3,440 m) is near Kuz Ganrshal in the north of the district. Shangla District is connected to the Swat District by the Shangla Pass.

== Demographics ==
Historical population
Year	Pop.	±% p.a.
1951	107,731	—
1961	121,528	+1.21%
1972	179,813	+3.63%
1981	251,546	+3.80%
1998	434,563	+3.27%
2017	759,609	+2.98%
2023	891,252	+2.70%

As of the 2023 census, Shangla district has 125,540 households and a population of 891,252. The district has a sex ratio of 106.65 males to 100 females and a literacy rate of 33.74%: 48.82% for males and 17.82% for females. 307,444 (34.51% of the surveyed population) are under 10 years of age. The entire population lives in rural areas. 2,410 (0.27%) people in the district are from religious minorities, mainly Christians.

Languages of Shangla district (2023)
1. Pashto (95.4%)
2. Kohistani (1.03%)
3. Others (3.57%)

Pashto was the predominant language, spoken by 95.40% of the population. 1.03% of the population spoke Kohistani languages.

The main tribe of Shangla is Yusufzai, that contribute more than half of the district population, the dense and well populated area of Shangla is Alpuri tehsil (Gwarband) that contributes to more than 253000+ of the district population. Shangla is one of the unique districts of Pakistan that contains more than 80% of forest land. The youngest noble laurate Malala Yousafzai's father, Ziauddin Yousafzai, was born in Shangla, however, she herself was born in Mingora, Swat.

== Education ==
In November 2022, the Chief Minister of Khyber Pakhtunkhwa, Mahmood Khan, inaugurated University of Shangla. The university was earlier a campus of University of Swat.

== National and provincial assembly ==
This district is represented by one elected MNA (Member of National Assembly) in Pakistan National Assembly. Its constituency is NA-31.

== Since 2002: NA-11 (Shangla) ==
Election	Member	Party
2002	Engr Amir Muqam	MMA
2008	Engr Amir Muqam	PML
2013	Dr Ibadullah Khan	PML (N)
2018	Dr Ibadullah Khan	PML (N)

2024 Amir muqam pakistan muslim league N

== Provincial Assembly ==
Member of Provincial Assembly	Party affiliation	Constituency	Year								
Sher Muhammad Khan	Pakistan People's Party	PF-71 previously Swat	1977								
Haji Badiu zaman khan	Pakistan People's Party	PF-73 Previously Swat	1988								
Haji Badiu zaman khan	Pakistan People's Party	PF-73 Previously Swat	1993								
Dr.Afsar ul mulk	Pakistan People's Party	PF-73 Previously Swat	1995								
Engr.Hamid Iqbal	Pakistan People's Party	PK-87 Shangla-I	2002	Abdul Munim	Independent	PK-88 Shangla-II	-	Shaukat Ali Yousafzai	Pakistan Tehreek-e-Insaf	PK-23 Shangla-I	2018
Faisal Zeb	Awami National Party	PK-24 Shangla-II	2018								

-

== Notables ==
- Hafiz Alpuri
- Amir Muqam
- Malala Yousafzai
- Hussan Jamala

== See also ==
- Districts of Pakistan
  - Districts of Khyber Pakhtunkhwa, Pakistan
  - Districts of Punjab, Pakistan
  - Districts of Balochistan, Pakistan
  - Districts of Sindh, Pakistan
  - Districts of Azad Kashmir
  - Districts of Gilgit-Baltistan
- Divisions of Pakistan
  - Divisions of Balochistan
  - Divisions of Khyber Pakhtunkhwa
  - Divisions of Punjab
  - Divisions of Sindh
  - Divisions of Azad Kashmir
  - Divisions of Gilgit-Baltistan

== Bibliography ==
- 1998 District Census report of Shangla. Census publication. Vol. 106. Islamabad: Population Census Organization, Statistics Division, Government of Pakistan. 2000.
