= Kharshbun =

Kharshbun and Sharkhbun are Sarban. The Sarbani tribes, all supposed descendants of Sarban, form one of the major lineage branches of the Pashtun tribes. Kharshbun's progeny compose the eastern Pashtuns, and he had three sons Kand, Zamand, Kasi, whereas his brother Sharkhbun's progeny compose the Western Pashtuns, the most famous of these latter Pashtuns being the Durrani or Abdali tribes. The following is a genealogical breakdown of Kharshbun's sons and the tribes that are said to be their descendants, as found in Olaf Caroe's history, The Pathans.

Kharshbun:

1. Kand

- Khashi khel
- Yusufzai
- Mandanr
- Gigyani tribe
- Tarkalani
- Ghoryakhel
- Khalil
- Daudzai
- Mohmand
- Chamkani
- Shalmani
- Mullagori
- Zakhel or Azakhel
- Hazarbuz

2. Zamand tribe

- Kheshgi
- Muhammadzai (Hashtnagar)

3. Kasi

- Shinwari
- Gumoriani
