= Ghoryakhel =

Subtribe of Pashtuns

The Ghoryakhel (Pashto: غورياخېل) is a Pashtun sub-tribe. Ghoryakhel consists of tribes led by the son of Kand, son of Kharshbun, son of Sarban, and son of Qais Abdur Rashid, who lived in Ghwara Marghay Arghistan Kandahar, mostly in Ghazni, Nangarhar, Logar, Ghor, Kabul, Kunar, Paktia, Kunduz, Zabul, and Herat. Ghoryakhels are living in every Province of Afghanistan.

== Wars with The Mughals ==
The first confrontation of the Ghoryakhels with the Mughals occurred during 1510 to 1515 with the Founder of Mughal Empire Babur in Ghazni where Babur tried to Loot their Wealths but refraind by doing so after a little skirmish and Changed his mind to go for the Ghilzais instead of The Mohmands

== Distribution ==
The Ghoryakhel tribe settled in Pakistan, Khyber-Pakhtunkhwa, Peshawar, Charsada, Mardan, Nowshehra, Atock, Swabi Khyber, Kurram, Mohmand, Malakand, Swat Districts and settled between 15th and 16th century. The largest tribe belonging to the Ghoryakhel confederacy is Momand and second-largest his brother Daudzai, son of Daulatyar while other tribes belonging to the confederacy include, Khalil (Pashtun tribe), Chamkani, Zeerani, Mullagori, Halimzai, Zakhel or Azakhel, Tarakzai, Hazarbuz Pashtun branch of Khawezai Momand located Afghanistan, they are also known as Bar Durranis (Upper Durranis) a Title given by Ahmad Shah Abdali. The legendary Pashto Poet Rahman Baba as well as Abdul Hamid Baba also belonged to Momand tribe of Ghoryakhel.

According to the Pata Khazana Pashtun History Book written by Abdulhai, Habibi Kharshbun and Sharkhbun are brothers. Kharshbun had three sons, Kand, Zamand and Kasi, while Sharkhbun had six sons, Urmar, Babar, Baraich, Miana, Tareen and Sheerani. Kand had two sons, Ghoryakhel and Khakhykhel. Ghoryakhel had four sons Khalil, Chamkani, Daulatyar, Zeerani. Daulatyar had two sons Mohmand or Momand and Daudzai. Khakhykhel had three sons, Mand, Gigyani, Tarkalani, Mand had two sons Mandar and Yousafzai. Zamand had five sons, Muhammadzai and Kheshgi are the most popular. Kasi had eleven sons. Shinwari and Zhamaryani are the most popular.

== Wars with the British ==
In 1924 the Battle of Sheenday (Shahindagan) (Ghoryakhel victory), 1926 sack of Jahangir Abad (British victory), 1926 Surizai campaign (British victory), 1926 Urmar Campaign 1927 Azakhel operation.

== Ghoryakhel tribes ==
- Mohmand
- Khalil (Pashtun tribe)
- Chamkani (Pashtun tribe)
- Mullagori
- Shilmani
- Halimzai
- Hazarbuz
- Daudzai
- Bazidkhel (Bazidkhail)
- Zeerani (Pashtun tribe)
- Zakhel (Pashtun tribe)

== See also ==
- Pashtun tribes
- Pashtun people
- Khalil (Pashtun tribe)
- Qais Abdur Rashid
