= Chamkani =

Chamkani, Tsamkani, or Samkani may refer to:

- Tsamkani District, a district of Paktia Province, Afghanistan
  - Tsamkani, main town of Tsamkani District
- Chamkani, Peshawar, a neighborhood of Peshawar District, Khyber Pakhtunkhwa, Pakistan
- Chamkani (Pashtun tribe), a Pashtun tribe based in Tsamkani District, Paktia Province (Afghanistan) and Kurram and Peshawar Districts (Pakistan)
