= Tatur =

Pashtun tribe

Tator
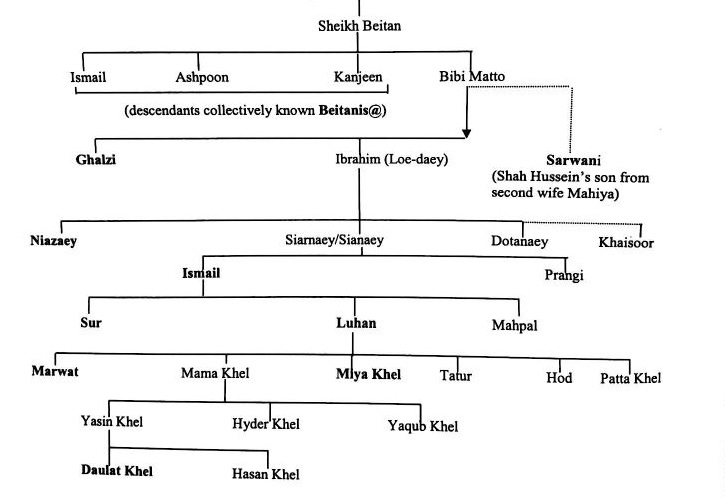
- The position of Tator among the Lodi/Lohani tribes and the larger Bettani tribal confederacy.
- Ethnicity: Pashtun
- Location: Tank District, Frontier Region Tank
- Parent tribe: Lohani, Lodi
- Religion: Sunni Islam

Tator (Pashto:ټاټور) also known as Tatur, is a small Pashtun tribe among the larger Lodi/Lohani tribe located in Tank District of Pakistan.

== History ==
The earliest historical mention of the Tator comes from the early 17th century Makhzan-i-Afghani compiled by Nimat Allah al-Harawi and financed by Khan Jahan Lodi.

To Lodi, God Almighty gave three sons, Niazi, Siani and Dotani. To Siani, God Almighty gave two sons, Ismail and Prangi. Ismail had three sons, Sur, Lohani and Mahpal. Lohani's original name was Nuh. He had two wives; Toori and Shiri. From the first wife he had five sons, Mamya, Mia, Tatur, Patakh and Hud. Shiri, the second wife of Lohani, had one son, whom she called Marwat.

— Nimat Allah al-Harawi, Makhzan-i-Afghani

As a Lohani tribe, the Tator have shared the same historical migration pattern as other Lohani, such as the Marwats, with their previous settlments in Paktika Province of Afghanistan, specifically the Katawaz area in Khairkot District, as well as a presence in Waziristan, before eventually settling in neighboring Tank District. In South Waziristan, a Lodi tribe known as the Dotani still exists.

"Nothing is more remarkable throughout Waziristan than the traces of terraced fields which remain to show that once men grew corn where there is no tillage. In Waziristan anyhow local tradition is unanimous that it was in the days of the Marwats or the Urmars that, these lands were cultivated and mainly all the water channels of any size or length which still survive were cut."

— Evelyn Howell, Mizh: a monograph on government‘s relations with the Mahsud tribe, Pg 97

Like other Lohani tribes, the Tator also gained prominence in India. During the reign of the Mughal emperor Akbar, Ghazi Khan Tator remained loyal to the Sur dynasty. Following Sikandar Shah Suri submission to Akbar in 1557 after the Siege of Mankot, Ghazi Khan Tator accompanied the Sur ruler's son, Abd Al-Rahman, to the Mughal court as one of Sikandar Shah's most trusted follower.

The Tator were mentioned by the Indian surveyor Syed Ghulam Muhammad in 1780, who was commissioned by the British to travel through Durrani Afghanistan. He described Tator as a large village in Tank, of about 3,000 to 4,000 families, governed by Fazil Khan, their chief. Fazil paid 2,000 rupees to the treasury of Timur Shah, the Durrani ruler of Kabul, and, in wartime, was required to provide 60 cavalrymen for the royal army.

Katal Khan Kati Khel, the Nawab of Tank, later brought the Tator under his subjugation during a tribal conflict. The conflict is remembered as having greatly reduced the strength of the Tator. Later accounts noted the decline of the Tator over the previous century. Muhammad Hayat Khan in his Hayat-e-Afghani, published in 1867, numbers the tribe at 300 families. Henry Raverty notes the tribe's total male population as between 60 and over 100 men in 1880.
