= Mulagori =

Subtribe of Mohmand Pashtun

Mullagori or Mullaghori or Mallagori
ملاغوری یا ملاگوری یا ملاغوري
- 40188

Languages
- Pashto

Religion
- Islam

Related ethnic groups
- Afridi; Mohmand; Shinwari; Shilmani; Yusufzai; Peshawari; Khattak; Marwat; Bangash; Bannuzais; and other Pashtun tribes

The Mullagori or Mullagori or Mallagori (Pashto: ملاګوری Mullagorai, plur. ملاګوري Mullagori) is a Pashtun tribe present in Khyber District, tribal areas in Khyber Pakhtunkhwa, Pakistan. Historically, they are one of the smallest tribes of ethnic Pashtuns. They are considered as a sub-tribe of Momand Pashtun Ghoryakhel confederacy.

They are natively based in Mullagori Tehsil of Khyber District and in the Prang Ghar Tehsil of Mohmand District in the Province of Khyber Pakhtunkhwa, Pakistan, and in Nangarhar Province, Afghanistan. They are also present in smaller numbers in Charsadda and in Balochistan.

Almost all of the Mullagoris speak a northern variety of Pashto and some southern variety of Pashto.

== Origin ==
The Mullagori (Pashto: ملاګوري), also spelled Mulagori and Mallagori, is sub section of Momand Pashtun Ghoryakhel confederacy. Predominantly Mullagori inhabit to the Khyber District in the previous Federally Administered Tribal Areas now Khyber Pakhtunkhwa, Pakistan and in Nangarhar Province, Afghanistan.

The Mullagori were considered to be the fighters tribe of Pashtuns during the British rule in East India. They settled just north of the Khyber Pass during the time when Islam was brought to South Asia. There are two main settlements of Mullagoris, One type of Mullagori are called "Da Sasobi Mulagori". Sasobi Mulagoris are living in Sasobi area of Nangarhar Province of Afghanistan near Tirah hills, while the other are called "Da Tatare Mulagori" that are living to the north-east of Khyber Pass. Other areas inhabited by the Mullagori include Munda (near Shabqadar), Harichand in Charsadda, Badraga (Malakand Agency), Pir Saddi village in Mardan and in Peshawar close to Shah Qabul areas of Dabgari, and on Dalazak Road, Nangrahar province near Lal Pura, Kunar Province, and Hilmand (Afghanistan).

The name Mullagori is derived from Mulla (religious leader) and Ghori (from Muhammad of Ghor). British colonial governmental records misspelled the word Ghori as Gori And that is why the Mulla Gori tehsil is suffixed with Gori not Ghori. In his book, The Pathan Borderland, James W. Spain believes the Mulagori to be the descendants of the Mulla Ghor (son of Ba-Yazid Ansari, the Pir Rokhan of the Pakhtuns, and Pir Tarik of the Mughals). The Pashtun historian Bahadur Shah Zafar Kaka Khel, in his book Pukhtana da Tarikh pa Ranra key, is of the opinion that the Mullagori are a subgroup of the Mohmand tribe.

Dr Latif Yaad in his book Pukhtane Qabil Wapijany writes that Mullagori are basically a part of Mohmands. He tells a story that once few persons in Mohmands went somewhere. One of them was a mullah he separated from them. One of the group members told that "MULLA GORAI" (a phrase meaning "Let's find Mulla" in Pashto) and after that, the person was known as Mullagoray. He adds that according to Famous Pashto Poet, Hamza Shinwari said Mullagoris are behaving and talking like Mohmands so they are basically a part of the Mohmands.

However, some oral sources has further clarified the situation about Mullagori's origin. They opine that Mullagori are in fact a section of Dawezai Momands. In the Dawezai area in Momand Agency, more than 600 Mullagori families still reside. On the basis of this, Mullagori are Mohmand / Momand, and in Momands belongs to Dawezai sub-section. Interestingly, everywhere Mullagori resides near Momands, and in most cases are in matrimonial relations with them. Historically, Mullagori have remained in a very cordial relations with the other sections of Momands, and have supported each other's causes, in case of tribal wars with other tribes like Afridis etc.

The author of Hayat-i-Afghani writes:

"Its ancestor, say these, was a stranger who attached himself to the Mohmand and partook their fortunes. Others relate that this ancestor was a Mohmand of the name of "Mullah", who having once taken part with some of his fellows in a robbing enterprise, was afterwards observed by his companions to be standing apart with fixed look as if in meditation; upon which one of them remarked in Pashto "Mullagori" i.e. "Mullah is looking or staring" and the phrase clung to him and finally gave the name to his descendants. Whatever may be thought of this story, certain it is that the Mulla-gori live in the midst and in close community of interest with the hill Mohmand."

William Rudolph Henry Merk, who prepared a report on Mohmands, had a theory that Mullagoris could be remnants of Dilazak Pashtuns. He writes that Mullagoris have tradition that their ancestors founded a great kingdom, the capital of which was somewhere near Pesh Bolak in Ningarhar (which was formerly inhabited by Dilazaks).

== Clans / Sub-Tribes ==
The forefather of the Mullagori was said to have had four sons, and each son fathered a sub-section of the Mulagori tribe. The four sub-tribes are named after the sons:

- Pahar Khel
- Taar Khel
- Ahmed Khel
- Daulat Khel

Some other sub-tribes were also came into existence with time, like;

- Miyan Khel
- Chamyar Khel (In Shakoor)
- Ara Khel (In Pir Sado)
- Ali Khan Khel (Pir Sado)
- Bayan Khel (Afghanistan)

The Taar Khel constitute approximately 50% of the total population of Mullagori residing in the Khyber District. They are known for their high level of education and hold influential positions in various professions. On the other hand, the Pahar Khel exert dominance in the internal affairs of the Mullagori tribe, including traditional practices such as jirga assemblies. They wield significant influence within the tribe, surpassing other sub-tribes in their involvement in tribal matters.

The author of Hayat-i-Afghani writes:

"The Mullagori clan, with its four sub-divisions of Pahar-Khel, Tar-Khel, Ahmad-Khel and Daulat-khel, is held by some not to be of Afghan stock at all. The clan, numbering about 500 men at the time, is chiefly settled in the Tahtara, where it apportions its time and energies between the conflicting claims of pillage and agriculture. The following are maliks: of the Pahar-Khel, Shengi Khan and Dad Gul; of the Tar-khel, Khadri and Khairu Khan; of the Ahmad-Khel, Mir Alim, son of Sikandar; of the Daulat Khel, Asmatullah."

== Religion ==
Mullagoris predominantly adhere to the Sunni sect of Islam, with nearly the entire tribe identifying as Sunni Muslims.

== Distribution ==
They Predominantly live in the Mullagori Tehsil of Khyber Agency District in the Province of Khyber Pakhtunkhwa, Pakistan, in the Mohmand District and in Nangarhar Province, Afghanistan.
