= Bettani =

Pashtun tribe in Afghanistan and northwest Pakistan

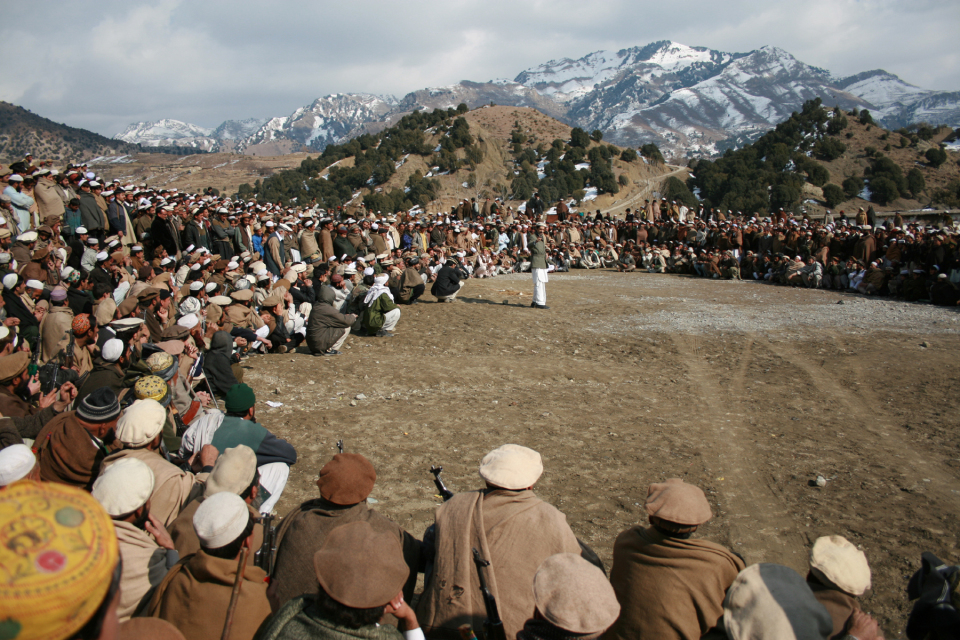
Bettani Tribe

The Bettani (Pashto: بېټني), also spelled Batani, Baittani or Bhittani, are one of the four traditional Pashtun confederations native to Afghanistan and Pakistan. The Bettani are named after Shaykh Beṭ, their legendary ancestor, who is said to be the third and last son of Qais Abdur Rashid (575 – 661).

The Bettanis are Sunni Muslims of the Hanafi school. The Bettani confederacy includes the tribes of Bettanis, and the Matti tribes, which are the progeny of Bibi Mattu, the daughter of Sheikh Bettan. These include the Lodi or Lohani, Ghilzai, Hotak, Suri, Stanikzai, Aka khel, Ibrahim khel, Sulemankhel, Gulwal, Tarakai, Tokhi and many others. The Shirani tribe has also been referenced as a component of the Bettani confederacy.

== History ==
According to Makhzan-e-Afghani, a compiled history of Afghans written by Ni'mat Allah al-Harawi, the Bettani are said to be named after their ancestor Betṭ Baba (claimed by a legend to be the first Pashto poet), who lived in the Altamur range, which is located between Logar and Zurmat. The narrative continues with the account of his burial in Ghazni.

The Bettani are also known to have lived in the different parts of today’s Afghanistan such as Logar, Zurmat mazar sharif, Jalalabad and Ghazni areas of Afghanistan. However, this period saw them embroiled in conflicts with the Ghilji group. The Bettanis were eventually compelled to vacate these areas, moving towards the east. Among Bettanis, some managed to secure control over Gabarḡar, situated between the Bannu Basin and Dēra, while other segments of the Bettani lineage migrated further northeastward to the Gangetic plains.

== Settlements ==
Some Bettanis reside in Pakistan, in Tank, Quetta district and Lakki Marwat. Jandola is considered the capital of the Bettani tribes. The area is mainly inhabited by the Bettanis. They also inhabit Dera Ismail Khan and Bannu, mostly in the mountainous areas on the borders of Tank and Bannu, from the Gabbar mountain in the north to the Gomal valley in the south.

According to Captain Robinson's book “Notes on Nomad Tribes of Eastern Afghanistan” page 158 ibid, the Bhittanis/Betani or Baitanais (Katagram clan of Bhittanis of Quetta), besides those who are settled in Jandola, Dera Ismail Khan and Bannu Districts and in the South Waziristan Agency there were three villages of Bhittani settled in Karabagh, Ghazni, making about one hundred families of Powindahs. The nomads live and migrated towards Kuchlak, Bostan and then Kotwal area of Nawan Killi Quetta around the 1880s and then towards Jamia Masjid Nawan Killi in the 1920s then finally settled in Nawan Killi Nasran in 1953. As per Robinson, there were total 30 families of Bhittani with the' Mian Khel, and 70 families scattered among the Nasar tribes. The Baitanais and Nasars of Quetta have been enjoying brotherly relations since ages. They have strong ties and family bounds with each others. These tribes used to spend all winter in the Dera Ismail Khan District. Their means of livelihood was the same as that of the tribes with which they live (Nasars).

During the reign of the Lodi dynasty, some Bettanis had prestigious positions, and many of them served in the Sultanate's army.

== Tribal organization ==
The Bettani tribe is divided into four subgroups: Tattao (mostly living in Jandola, Siraghar, and Dera Ismail Khan), Bakhtiyari (living throughout Pakistan and in Petlad, Gujarat), Dhanna (living on the Gabbar mountain and in Lakki Marwat District), and Waraspun (living in Dera Ismail Khan and nearby valleys). Lakki Marwat District is also inhabited by the Boba, Bobak, and Wargara clans of the Bettanis.

The Tattao are subdivided into three clans: the Umarkhail, the Aba Khel, the Naimat Khel, and the Khaishi. The Dhanna are divided into the Ali Khail, Rattanzai, , Bobi, Waroki, and Dadi Khel sub-clans. The Waraspun are divided into the Mazyani, Tari, Chapli, and Shakhi clans.

The Bettani population from 8,000 – 9,000 in c. 1884 to over 43,000 by c. 1960 in South Waziristan Pakistan only.

Currently, the Bettani tribe numbers between 30,00,000 to 45,00,000 including all the Bettani tribes ( Lar aw Bar) including regions of Pakistan and Afghanistan.

== Bettani Sufi saints ==
The shrine of Mama Peer is located near the town of Umar Adda. Some people in the area visit the shrine on a daily basis, particularly on Fridays. Many devotees also visit the shrine of the Sufi saint Sheikh Younas, situated near Jandola, one of the principal towns of Bettani tribe.

== Notable people ==
- Zafar Beg Bhittani
- Abdul Shakoor

== See also ==
- Gharghashti
- Karlani
- Sarbani
