= Constitution (Thirtieth Amendment) Act, 2017 =

Pakistani legislation

The Constitution (Thirtieth Amendment) Act, 2017 was a proposed amendment to the Constitution of Pakistan seeking to create seats for the Federally Administered Tribal Areas in the Khyber Pakhtunkhwa Assembly and establish a new judicial system in the tribal belt. The amendment would have added new provisions to the Constitution to provide for representation of FATA in the Khyber Pakhtunkhwa Assembly after the merger of FATA and Khyber Pakhtunkhwa. The amendment was introduced in the National Assembly of Pakistan alongside the Tribal Areas Rewaj Act.

It proposed development was never adopted. Some of these provisions were included in the Twenty-fifth Amendment to the Constitution of Pakistan.
