= Sarbani =

Tribal group of Pashtuns

Sarbani سړبني
- Ethnicity: Pashtun
- Location: Afghanistan, Pakistan, India, Iran
- Population: several millions
- Branches: Barech, Durrani, Ghoryakhel, Tareen, Yousufzai
- Language: Pashto
- Religion: Islam

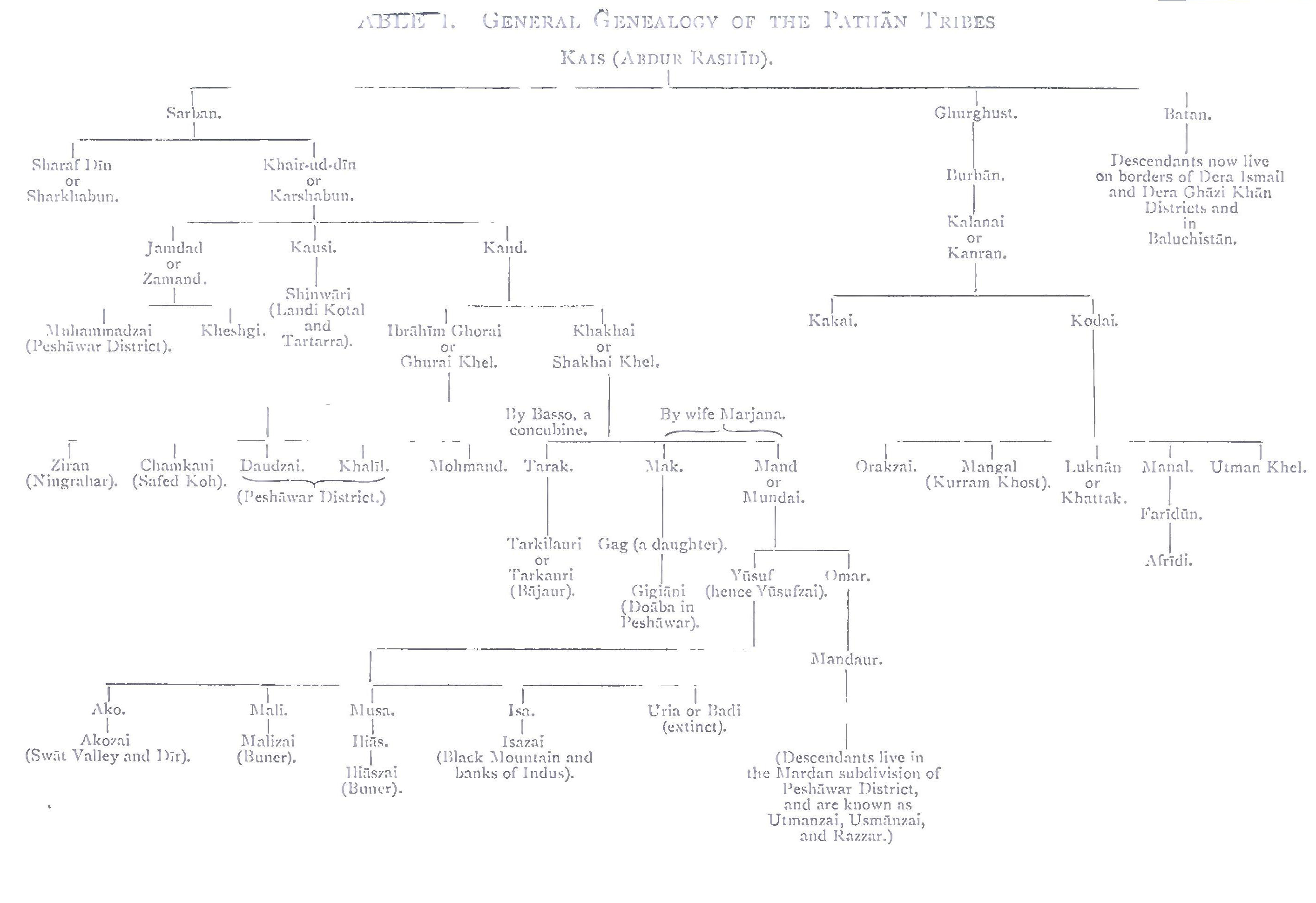
Genealogy of Pathan tribes, originating from Qais Abdur Rashid.

The Saṛbanī (Pashto: سړبني) or Sarban Confederacy are one of the four traditional tribal confederations of Pashtuns, native to Pakistan and Afghanistan. The Sarbani include numerous Pashtun tribes (see Sarbani § Sarbani tribes). According to the Pashtun legend of origins, the members of the Sarbani group all descend from Sarban, said to be the first son of the legendary founding father of the Pashtun people, Qais Abdur Rashid.

== History ==
The origin of the Sarbani may be connected with Hephthalites, who had a large nomadic confederation that included present-day Afghanistan and Pakistan in the 5th-6th centuries AD, as well as with Scythians, who are known to have settled where most of Pashtuns live today.

The Durrani Empire that existed in the 18th-19th centuries and that was centered in the territory of present-day Afghanistan and Pakistan was founded by the Ahmad Shah Durrani, a Pashtun military commander under Nader Shah of Persia and chief of the Abdali Sarban tribe. Since that time, the Abdali tribe has been known as Durrani.

== Geographic distribution ==
=== Afghanistan ===
In Afghanistan, Sarbani mainly inhabit the provinces of Kandahar, Zabul, Uruzgan, Helmand, Kabul, Nimroz, Farah, Herat, Badghis, Balkh, and Kunduz, as well as the provinces Nangarhar, Balkh, Ghor, Ghazni,Badakhshan and Kunar in the eastern part of the country.

=== Pakistan ===
In Pakistan, Sarbanis are living throughout the city of Peshawar, northern and eastern parts of Khyber Pakhtunkhwa and the former Federally Administered Tribal Areas. Additional large settlements are found in Multan, Quetta, Mansehra, Azad Kashmir, Abbottabad, Haripur and in the northern parts of Balochistan. Other medium or small-sized settlements can be found in Lahore, Sheikhupura, Gujranwala, Islamabad, Rawalpindi, and Faisalabad.

=== India ===
In India Sarbanis are found in various parts of the country mostly they live in UP, Agra,Delhi, Punjab, Bhopal, Kashmir, Bihar,Rajasthan, Gujrat and Bengal. They are Descendants or part of Afghan, Turkic conquerors and Afghan Sarbani traders who settled in India.

=== Iran ===
In Iran the Sarbanis live in Mazandaran,Isfahan, Kerman, Khorasan and in Sistan.

== Sarbani tribes ==
Abubakar Siddique writes that "Under the prevailing classifications, Pashtuns are divided into four main tribal groupings: the Sarbani, Bettani, Ghurghust, and Karlani." The Sarbanis are divided into two branches: the Sharkbun and the Kharshbun.

=== List ===
The most significant tribes.

- Barech
- Ghoryakhel
- Chamkani
- Daudzai
- Mandanr
- Utmanzai
- Durrani
- Loni
- Kasi
- Khalil
- Mohmand
- Sheerani
- Shinwari
- Tareen
- Tarkalani
- Yusufzai
- Mullagori
- Zeerani
- Zakhel
- Hazarbuz
- Shilmani
- Muhammadzai
- Kheshgi
- Achakzai
- Noorzai
- Alkozai
- Popalzai

== See also ==
- Pashtun tribes
- Pashtunistan
