= Shaukat Aziz (disambiguation) =

Shaukat Aziz may refer to:

- Shaukat Aziz Siddiqui (born 1959), Pakistani jurist and former senior Justice of the Islamabad High Court
- Shaukat Aziz (born 1949), 17th prime minister of Pakistan
- Shoukat Aziz (born 1996), Pakistani human rights activist
