= Gharghashti =

Gharghashti, also spelt Gharghushti and Ghurghushti, are the fourth traditional Pashtun tribal confederation, alongside Sarbani, Bettani and Karlani. Prominent Gharghushti tribes include Kakar, Safi and Panni. Majority tribesmen are native to northern Balochistan and southern Khyber Pakhtunkhwa in Pakistan, but a significant population also exists in eastern Afghanistan. They are traditionally believed to be named after the third son of Qais Abdur Rashid, the legendary progenitor of Pashtun people.
