= Lora Miana =

- Country: Pakistan
- Region: Federally Administered Tribal Areas
- District: Khyber Agency
- Tehsil: Mula Gori Tehsil

Population (2017)
  - Total: 7,466
- Time zone: UTC+5 (PST)
  - Summer (DST): UTC+6 (PDT)

Lora Miana, or Lwara Myana is an area of Mula Gori Tehsil, Khyber Agency, Federally Administered Tribal Areas, Pakistan. The population is 7,466 according to the 2017 census.
