= Tribal Areas Rewaj Act =

Pakistani legal proposal

Tribal Areas Rewaj Act, 2017

Parliament of Pakistan
- Long title: An Act to provide for a system of administration of justice, maintenance of peace and good governance in the Federally Administered Tribal Areas and Protected or Administered Areas
- Territorial extent: Federally Administered Tribal Areas

Legislative history
- Bill title: Tribal Areas Rewaj Bill, 2017
- Bill citation: Tribal Areas Rewaj Bill

Repeals
- Frontier Crimes Regulation, 1901

Related legislation
- Supreme Court and High Court (Extension of Jurisdiction to Federally Administered Tribal Areas) Act, 2018; FATA Interim Governance Regulation, 2018; Thirty-first Amendment to the Constitution of Pakistan
- Status: Not passed

The Tribal Areas Rewaj Act was a bill introduced in the National Assembly of Pakistan but later withdrawn by the Government of Pakistan due to widespread opposition. The proposed legislation aimed to merge the Federally Administered Tribal Areas (FATA) with the province of Khyber Pakhtunkhwa over a five-year period. The act intended to replace the Frontier Crimes Regulations (FCR) and extend the jurisdiction of the Supreme Court of Pakistan and the Peshawar High Court to FATA.
