= FATA Interim Governance Regulation, 2018 =

President of Pakistan
- Enacted by: President of Pakistan
- Enacted: May 28th, 2018

Related legislation
- Tribal Areas Rewaj Act, Thirty-first Amendment to the Constitution of Pakistan
- Status: In force

The FATA Interim Governance Regulation, 2018 was a law signed by the President of Pakistan on May 28, 2018, which replaces the Frontier Crimes Regulations (FCR) and outline how the Federally Administered Tribal Areas will be governed "within a timeframe of two years" as the region is merged with Khyber Pakhtunkhwa through the passage of the Thirty-first Amendment to the Constitution of Pakistan. An official described the regulation as a combination of the FCR and the rejected Tribal Areas Rewaj Act.

The regulation has been signed under Article 247 of the Constitution of Pakistan which stood to be repealed by the Thirty-first Amendment, which the President has signed on 31 May 2018.

== Details ==
The regulation converts the office of Political Agent(Pakistan) into the office of Deputy Commissioner, and Assistant Political Agent into Assistant Commissioner. The tribal agencies are replaced by districts and the frontier regions are made sub-divisions. The institution of jirga is maintained as the Council of Elders and as the Quami Jirga. The regulation gives precedence to the 'rewaj' (local customs) determined by the Council of Elders. The establishment of new hamlets or villages, or the creation of towers or walled enclosures on the frontiers of the country, is prohibited without permission of the Deputy Commissioner. The Governor has the power to relocate settlements near the border, as long as it rewards compensation to the inhabitants.

The Supreme Court and High Court (Extension of Jurisdiction to Federally Administered Tribal Areas) Act 2018 is not mentioned in the regulation.

== Reception ==
Farhatullah Babar, a leader of the Pakistan Peoples Party, said the interim regulation should be placed before the Parliament of Pakistan for discussion before its approval. He also stated the regulation should have a sunset clause.
