= Mullagori Tehsil =

Mullagori Tehsil تحصیل ملاگوری ملاګوري تحصیل
- Tehsil
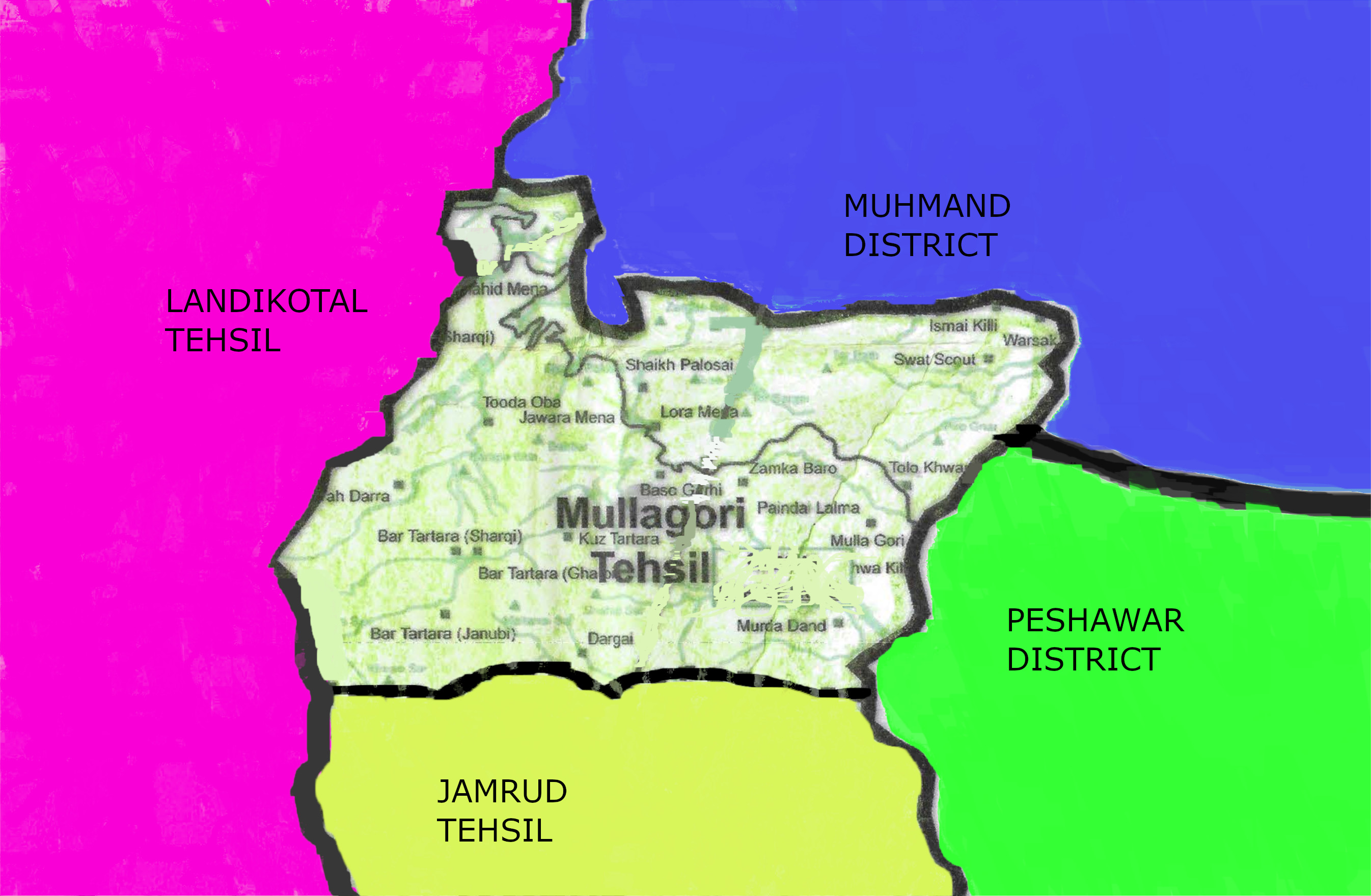
- Country: Pakistan
- Region: Khyber Pakhtunkhwa
- District: Khyber District

Government
  - Tehsil Chairman: Vacant
  - Member of Provincial Assembly, Khyber Pakhtunkhwa: Adnan Qadri (PTI)

Population (2017)
  - Tehsil: 40,188
  - Urban: 0
  - Rural: 40,188
- Time zone: UTC+5 (PST)

Mullagori Tehsil is a subdivision located in Khyber District, Khyber Pakhtunkhwa, Pakistan. It is located among the Tahtara hills on its west side and Peshawar on its east side. The population of Mullagori Tehsil is 40,188 according to the 2017 census. The population mostly belongs to the Mulagori tribe of the Pashtuns. This tehsil is situated to the north of the Khyber Pass in the Tahtara range. Their area extends from a little west of Chauki Sparsang to the crest of the Dabrai hill and from the Kabul River on the north to Lakka Sar on the south touching the land of the Kuki khel (Afridis sub-tribe) and Zakha khel (Afridis sub-tribe), and a clan of the Shinwari. Their neighbors on the west are the Shalmanis and on the north, the Tarakzai Mohmands.

== History ==
=== Construction of the Mullagori Road ===
The construction of the Mullagori military road in the Khyber Pass was initiated by Curzon, who found the concept appealing as it offered an alternative route to the Khyber Pass, providing strategic advantages for the British government in reinforcing positions at Landi Kotal and facilitating troop movements against the Afridis. Its completion in early 1905, at a cost of 404,000 rupees, was achieved without significant tribal opposition. In fact, the Mullagoris, Shinwari, and Shilmanis were rewarded for their cooperation with increased allowances. The successful completion of the road encouraged Curzon to further improve communication routes between Peshawar and Landi Khana through the Khyber Pass.

=== Khassadar Force ===
In the 1920s, during the British colonial era, the Khassadar Force was established to safeguard strategic roads in various agencies, including Mullagori. This force comprised members from local tribes, tasked with maintaining security along designated routes. The Khassadar system provided allowances to tribes through whose territories the roads passed, ensuring cooperation and protection of vital infrastructures.

== Physical Features ==
Mullagori is characterized by hilly terrain interspersed with narrow valley strips. Key geographical landmarks include Lakka Ghar, Surghar, and Tor Ghar Morgah. The upper part of Mullagori experiences water scarcity, limiting agricultural opportunities. The region is primarily barren, with sparse vegetation. Notable flora includes Gurgury (Monotheca buxifolia), found in hilly areas of Northern Pakistan and Afghanistan, bearing small fruits locally known as Gurgury.

== Climate ==
Mullagori experiences extreme climates, characterized by severe winters and summers. The hot months of May through August see temperatures soaring, with June recording maximum temperatures around 40 °C and minimums around 26 °C. Winters, spanning from November to April, are particularly harsh, with December, January, and February being the coldest months. January typically sees maximum temperatures around 18 °C and minimums around 4 °C. The average annual rainfall in Mullagori is approximately 400 mm.

== Tribes and Code of Honor ==
Mullagori is home to six main tribes: Afridi, Shinwari, Mohmand, Peshawari, Mullagori, and Shilmani. The Mullagori tribe predominates the area, lending its name to the tehsil. These tribes are known for their resilience and adherence to a code of honor passed down through generations. Key principles include Nanawati (seeking pardon), Tiga (Truce between 2 rival parties), Badal (retributive justice), and Melmastia (hospitality).
Mullagori tribesmen are described as tall, stout, fair-complexioned individuals with distinct features reflective of their mountainous origin. As compared to Shinwar and Kuki khels (Afridis), the Mullagories are relatively uneducated and, poor. However, they are well known for their unity and good spirit. They are also expert mountaineers and reign over every tribe of the Khyber range. Time after time, they have been victorious over both the Kuki khel (Afridis) and Zakh khel (Afridis). As a result, none of the Afridis care to be on bad terms with this small clan.

== Rivers and streams ==
The Kabul River traverses the territory of Tehsil Mullagori, entering from Kam Shilman and exiting into the Mohmand District near the Warsak Dam area.

== Mineral resources ==
Mullagori boasts significant mineral resources, including marble and soapstone.

=== Marble ===
Marble is abundant in Khyber District, with extensive deposits in various areas including Mullagori, Sultan Khel, Ghundai Sar, and Loe Shalman. Among these, the Mullagori marble deposits rank among the largest in the world, alongside Carrara in Italy and Makrana in India.

==== Marble deposits of Shahid Mena ====
At Shahid Mena, marble is associated with crystalline limestone beds, dolomite, quartzite, phyllite, and schistose rocks. The marble here is predominantly white with yellow, grey, and brown variations. It is medium to fine-grained and largely free from impurities, comparable to the quality of Makrana and Carrara marble. The reserves at Shahid Mena are estimated to be substantial, with significant workable marble deposits located at a depth of 10 to 12 meters. The area has been quarried for over a century, with more than 200 quarries currently operated by local Mullagori tribes.

==== Marble deposits of Kambela Khwar ====
In Kambela Khwar, marble deposits consist of metamorphosed limestone along with dolomite, quartzite, and phyllite. The marble here is thick-bedded, generally white to yellowish-white with grey or greenish bands, and medium to fine-grained. The estimated reserves are considerable, but disputes among local sub tribes have hindered exploitation.

Sabunay Marble deposits of village Murad Dand are another recent discovery of marble deposits in Tehsil Mullagori.

=== Soapstone Deposits ===
Soapstone, the second-largest mineral found in the Mullagori tehsil, contributes significantly to the region's mineral wealth.

=== Mining Practices and Challenges ===
Despite the rich mineral deposits, mining practices in Mullagori are often primitive and unsafe. Quarry workers primarily use basic tools like sickles, spades, chisels, and hammers, with minimal safety measures. This has led to numerous injuries and fatalities, with injured workers often lacking access to immediate medical care.

== Chief Villages ==
The principal villages of Mullagori tehsil include Lwara Maina, Paindi Lalma, Mianh Morcha, Sher Braj, Murad Dand, Tahtara, and Nihar Ghara.

== Education ==
Education facilities in Mullagori remains limited. The local populace, numbering nearly 50,000, faces challenges in accessing quality education, particularly for girls. The educational landscape comprises few high schools for boys and a scarcity of educational institutions for girls.
