= Jamshaid Khan Mohmand =

Pakistani politician

Jamshaid Khan Mohmand MPA

Member of the Khyber Pakhtunkhwa Assembly
- Incumbent
- Assumed office August 2013
- Constituency: PK-27 (Mardan-V)

Personal details
- Born: 3 February 1973 (age 53) Mardan District
- Party: Independent
- Relatives: Imran Khan Mohmand (late) brother, Mumtaz khan Muhmand, Munir khan muhmand, sattar khan muhmand, israr khan muhmand.
- Occupation: Politician

Jamshaid Khan Mohmand (born 3 February 1973) is a Pakistani Independent politician hailing from Mardan District. Mohmand is currently serving as Member of the Khyber Pakhtunkhwa Assembly. He is also serving as committee chairman and member of the different committees.

== Early life and education ==
Mohmand was born on 3 February 1973 in Mardan District. He got his MSc degree in International relations.

== Political career ==
Mohmand was elected as the member of the Khyber Pakhtunkhwa Assembly as Independent from PK-27 (Mardan-V) in by-polls election held in August 2013 following the seat fell vacant after the assassination of his brother Imran Khan Mohmand on 18 June 2013.
