= Tsamkani =

Chamkani څمکني
- Location in Afghanistan
- Coordinates: 33.8022°N 69.8329°E
- Country: Afghanistan
- Province: Paktia Province
- District: Chamkani District
- Elevation: 1,788 m (5,866 ft)

Population
  - Ethnicities: Pashtuns
- Time zone: UTC+4:30
- Postal code: 2258

Samkani (Pashto: څمکني), also spelled Chamkani or chamkani, is the main town of samkani District in Paktia Province, Afghanistan.

The Chamkani Mangal tribe of the Pashtuns is settled in the area around the town.Mangal (Pashtun tribe)

== Climate ==
Tsamkani has a humid continental climate (Köppen: Dfa), bordering on a monsoonal humid continental climate (Dwa) with hot summers and cold, snowy winters. Precipitation is very high most of the year.

Climate data for Tsamkani, Paktia Province
Month	Jan	Feb	Mar	Apr	May	Jun	Jul	Aug	Sep	Oct	Nov	Dec	Year
Mean daily maximum °C (°F)	3.3 (37.9)	5.0 (41.0)	11.7 (53.1)	17.2 (63.0)	22.2 (72.0)	26.1 (79.0)	27.2 (81.0)	25.6 (78.1)	23.9 (75.0)	18.3 (64.9)	11.1 (52.0)	6.1 (43.0)	16.5 (61.7)
Daily mean °C (°F)	−0.6 (30.9)	1.1 (34.0)	7.0 (44.6)	12.2 (54.0)	17.0 (62.6)	20.6 (69.1)	22.0 (71.6)	20.6 (69.1)	18.4 (65.1)	12.8 (55.0)	6.7 (44.1)	2.0 (35.6)	11.7 (53.0)
Mean daily minimum °C (°F)	−4.4 (24.1)	−2.8 (27.0)	2.2 (36.0)	7.2 (45.0)	11.7 (53.1)	15.0 (59.0)	16.7 (62.1)	15.6 (60.1)	12.8 (55.0)	7.2 (45.0)	2.2 (36.0)	−2.2 (28.0)	6.8 (44.2)
Average precipitation mm (inches)	92.5 (3.64)	167.3 (6.59)	191.9 (7.56)	213.7 (8.41)	246.0 (9.69)	111.3 (4.38)	163.5 (6.44)	197.0 (7.76)	80.3 (3.16)	40.7 (1.60)	54.1 (2.13)	28.0 (1.10)	1,586.3 (62.46)
Average relative humidity (%)	51	58	57	50	42	35	49	56	48	39	42	39	47
Source: World Weather Online

== See also ==
- Khost
- Loya Paktia
