= Murderous Outrages Regulation =

Regulations in 19th Century British India

The Murderous Outrages Regulation (or Act) refers to several pieces of legislation in 19th century British India (which then included modern Pakistan) that gave the colonial government additional powers to prosecute serious crimes such as murder.

- Punjab Murderous Outrages Act 1867: Also known as Act XXIII of 1867, for the suppression of murderous outrages in certain districts of the Punjab, detailed the "Punishment of fanatics murdering or attempting to murder", including such issues as forfeiture of property, trials, appeals, and disposal of the bodies of criminals.
- Murderous Outrages Act 1877 (revival and amendment of Act XXIII of 1867) or Act IV of 1877: also known as the "Ghazi Act",
- Frontier Murderous Outrages Regulation (IV of 1901): A Regulation to make better provision for the suppression of murderous outrages in certain frontier tracts.

== See also ==
- Frontier Crimes Regulations (applicable in the Federally Administered Tribal Areas of Pakistan)
