= Halimzai =

Subtribe of Mohmand Pashtun

The Halimzai (Pashto:حلیم‌زی) are the largest sub-tribe or clan of the Mohmand Pashtun tribe.

They live primarily in the Mohmand Agency of the Khyber-Pakhtunkhwa province of Pakistan. Part of their territory includes the historic Gandab valley that runs north west from Pir Killa (charsadda), a village on the Michni Shabqadar road, and some of them moved to Afghanistan living in Rodat district, Shabqadaris 32 km north of Peshawar.

== Political Importance ==
This tribe is one of the strongest among other sub-tribe due its central location as Ghalanai is the capital of Mohmand Agency and Gandhab is the biggest Bazzar of Mohmand agency. Government mainly depends upon Halimzai tribe. Gandhab is divided into Upper and Lower Gandhab.

== Halimzai subsections ==
Halimzai is sub divided into the following three sub tribes:

- Hamza Khel
- Wali Baig
- Kadi Khel

== Governance ==
On 2 February 2009, a fifty-member Jirga of the Mohmand assured the government of its support against militancy and pledged to fulfil their consequent territorial responsibilities. In the past they have: handed over heavy weapons originating in Afghanistan, agreed not to afford sanctuary to foreigners and agreed to co-operate with the government in acting against those who damage public property. These agreements are enforced within their territory by taking internal action, with punishments that include fines, demolition of property and expulsions from the Agency. In the past they have: handed over heavy weapons originating in Afghanistan, agreed not to afford sanctuary to foreigners and agreed to co-operate with the government in acting against those who damage public property.

Tribal elders from both the Halimzai and the Safi have co-operated to avoid tensions between their respective communities and to control activities seen as objectionable to Pashtun society.
