= The Death of Khan Jahan Lodi =

17th-century Mughal painting

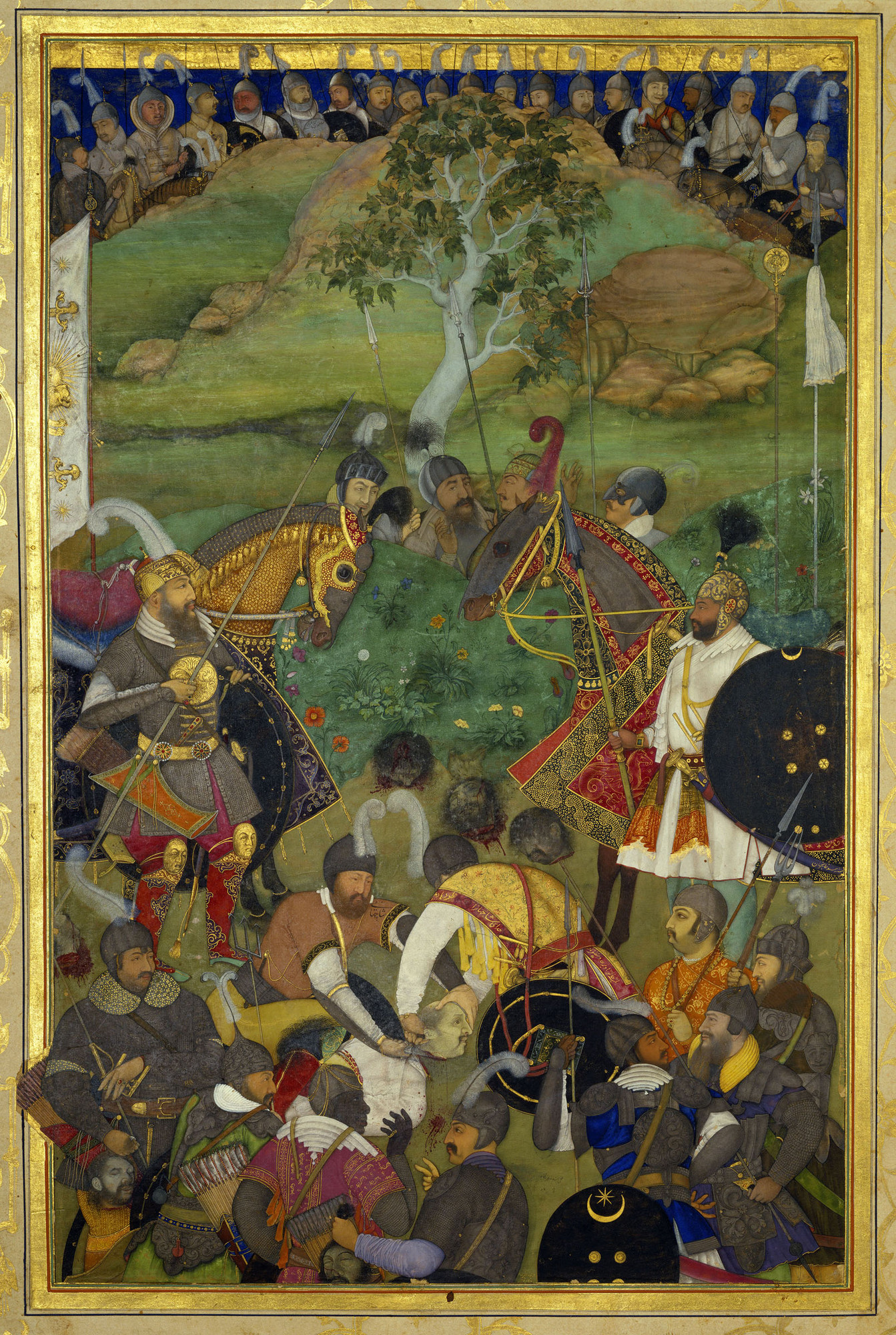
- Artist: 'Abid
- Medium: Opaque watercolor on paper
- Movement: Mughal painting
- Dimensions: 31.8 cm × 20 cm (12.5 in × 7.9 in)

The Death of Khan Jahan Lodi, also known as The Decapitation of Khan Jahan Lodi, is a 17th-century Mughal painting. A folio from an illustrated copy of the Padshahnama, it depicts the beheading of Khan Jahan Lodi.

== Background ==
Khan Jahan Lodi was a nobleman of the Mughal empire, who had attained a high status during the reign of the emperor Jahangir. However, with the accession of Jahangir's son Shah Jahan, he fell out of imperial favour. Subsequently, he fled the court in rebellion. Shah Jahan dispatched forces against Lodi. In the subsequent battle, in 1631, the Mughal forces were victorious as Lodi was killed. His severed head, as well as the heads of some of his sons and followers, were sent to the emperor.

This painting is an illustrated folio from the royal chronicle, the Padshahnama, wherein the event of Khan Jahan's death is recounted. It is dated to 1633, and attributed to the court artist 'Abid. Art historian B. N. Goswamy notes that the depiction is not historically accurate, as according to contemporary sources, Lodi's beheading took place after he had already been killed in battle. This contrasts with the "almost ceremonial" manner in which the beheading is portrayed in the painting. It might be the case that 'Abid was misinformed regarding the event. Alternatively, he might have been instructed to depict the event in this manner.

The setting for the battle is also not accurately depicted, and is of the artist's own conception. While the actual battle took place near Kalinjar Fort (in modern-day Uttar Pradesh), the landscape is markedly Iranian.

== Description ==
The painting is divided into three registers in a manner similar to durbar scenes. At the top of the painting is a row of soldiers, who look on from beyond a rocky hillside. Their plumes and lances rise into the painting's golden border. Flowers bloom on the ground and a plane tree rises in this upper portion, contrasting with the gruesome scene below. The plane tree, often associated with the Timurid dynasty, might be meant to represent the emperor, absent from this battle.

In the middle of the painting are two generals, standing with their horses, facing each other. A line of onlookers look toward the scene of the battle from behind a mound, laden with flowers. One of these looks directly toward the viewer, as if to call the viewer to witness the scene. This might be Farid, who was Lodi's only son to be captured alive.

Lodi's beheading takes place on the third, that is the lowest, register. One soldier forces him to his knees, holding his head by the ears, as another performs the decapitation with a knife. Lodi's eyes are still open, as he looks forward. The soldier on the left, that performs the decapitation, has the phrase "Shah Jahani" (of Shah Jahan) inscribed on his garment. Meanwhile, the soldier on the right, holding Lodi down, bears an inscription reading "May his most insignificant servant be victorious over the enemy; May God always grant victory to the King of the World".

The men performing the execution surrounded by the triumphant Mughal soldiers, clad in steel armor and wearing helmets, some of whom are speaking among each other. Among them, dressed in an orange jama, is the Rajput prince Madho Singh, who in reality had killed Lodi in battle. Apart from Lodi's head, which is in the midst of decapitation, six other severed heads are seen in the painting. Two of the soldiers are carrying a severed head each. These might be the heads of Lodi's sons, which would be later sent to the emperor. Some other severed heads are strewn about, surrounded by flies, and one is mounted on a spike. None of the severed heads have turbans on, with the removal of the turbans being a show of disrespect.

== Reception ==
B. N. Goswamy describes the work as a "gory scene of retribution, execution, and decay". In the book King of the World by Ebba Koch and Milo C. Beach, the painting is described to be "among the most complex and original of all Mughal pictures".
