= Mohmand =

Pashtun tribe

Mohmand tribe
مومند

Languages
- Pashto

Religion
- Sunni Islam

The Mohmand (Pashto: مومند) or Momand is a prominent tribe of Pashtun people belonging to the Ghoryakhel tribe of Sarbani Branch.

== Distribution ==
They are based primarily in the Mohmand territory, which is located in Nangarhar, Afghanistan and Mohmand Agency, in Pakistan. Momonds are in every province of Afghanistan, their areas of presence include Nangarhar, Ghazni, Kandahar, Kunar, Logar and Kunduz. Mohmands are In Khyber Pakhtunkhwa Pakistan, they predominantly reside in the Mohmand Agency (formerly part of the Tribal Areas), with others later settle area in Charsadda, Mardan and Peshawar District. Momands are living southside in Peshawar called (Koz Momand) in Pashto mean Lower Momand. as every historian or writer mentioned in their book, that these two Momand are the same Momand and same Shajarah Nasab, or Family Tree. Peshawar Momands has so many villages, from Badaber, Mashokhel, Hassankhel, Masrizai, Bazidkhel, etc.

== History ==
The Mohmand Ghoryakhel originally lived in the present-day Mohmand region, as well as in areas of Kandahar, Ghazni, Ghor, and between the basins of the Tarnak, Oxus and Indus rivers, along the present Afghanistan-Pakistan border.

Ghoryakhel consists of tribes descended by the son of Kand, son of Kharshbun, son of Sarban, and son of Qais Abdur Rashid, They originally lived in Ghwara Marghay, Arghistan, Kandahar, and are now mostly found in Ghazni, Nangarhar, Logar, Ghor, Kabul, Kunar, Paktia, Kunduz, Zabul and Herat. Ghoryakhel had four sons: Chamkani, Daulatyar, Khalil, and Zeerani. Daulatyar had two sons, Mohmands or Momands and Daudzai.

The Mohmand are historically known for resisting outside forces. From 1672 to 1676, under the leadership of Aimal Khan Mohmand, they rebelled and fought deadly wars against the Mughal Army. The Momands had many battles with the British Empire in multiple wars, Britain's "steady opponent" during the Second Afghan War was Akbar Khan, a Mohmand chief. The Mohmand partook in the 1897 Frontier Revolt, alongside other rebellions across Pashtunistan, for Afghan Independence in the 1919 Anglo-Afghan War and they also fought independently in the 1935 Mohmand Campaign. Additionally, the Mohmand people resisted other invaders of Afghanistan, such as during the Soviet–Afghan War as well as the American War in Afghanistan including against Pakistan Security Forces.

In May 2018, Mohmand tribal elders condemned the merger of the Federally Administered Tribal Areas with Khyber Pakhtunkhwa and expressed support for the creation of a separate province, Qabailistan.

== Notables ==
- Rahman Baba Abdur Rahmān Mohmand (1632–1706) (Pashto: عبدالرحمان بابا), or Rahmān Bābā (Pashto: رحمان بابا), was a renowned Pashtun Sufi Dervish and poet.
- Abdul Hamid Baba Abdul Hamid Mohmand ( –1732) (Pashto: عبدالحميد ماشو گگر), or Abdul Hamid (Pashto: عبدالحميد ), was a Pashtun poet and a Sufi figure.
- Aimal Khan Mohmand, Afghan warrior ruler who fought in the Afghan-Mughal Wars of the 17th Century against Emperor Aurangzeb
- Qalandar Momand, Pashto scholar, poet, critic, short story writer, journalist, linguist, lexicographer and academic.
- Mohammad Gul Khan Momand, Afghan Army Officer during the 1919 Anglo-Afghan War
- Abdul Ahad Momand, the first Afghan and the fourth Muslim to reach outer space.
- Rustam Shah Mohmand, former Chief Secretary of N.W.F.P, Diplomat, commissioner for Afghan Refugees and ambassador of Pakistan to Afghanistan
- Jamshaid Khan Mohmand, Member of Provincial Assembly of Khyber Pakhtunkhwa
- Imran Khan Mohmand, former ANP and later independent candidate in the Provincial Assembly of Khyber Pakhtunkhwa, martyred in a suicide blast in Shergarh
- Zain Khan Sirhindi (Mohmand), made Governor (Subahdar) of Sirhind province, India by Ahmad Shah Durrani (Abdali).
