= Shalman Valley =

Place in Khyber Pakhtunkhwa, Pakistan

Shalman District شلمان Bagh Kaley
- District
- Country: Pakistan
- Province: Khyber Pakhtunkhwa
- Headquarters: Landikotal

Area
  - Total: 2,230 km^{2} (860 sq mi)

Population (2014 (est))
  - Total: 33,000
  - Density: 54/km^{2} (140/sq mi)
- Time zone: UTC+5 (PST)
- ISO 3166 code: 0924
- Constituency: 1 seat [NA-45]

The Shalman Valley (Pashto: شلمان دره) is located in the Khyber-Pakhtunkhwa province of Pakistan. The tehsil headquarters are located at Landikotal. It was previously a subdivision of Shalman Tehsil, but was upgraded to the status of a tehsil on July 10, 2006 by the "MNA Noor ul Haq Alqadri". The total area of the Tehsil is 2,230 square kilometres. Shalman comprises two sub division, Kam Shalman and Loye Shalman. Shalman has the lowest Human Development Index in the province and second lowest in the country.

Shalmani also spelled as Shilmani, Shelmani, Sulemani is the tribe living in this valley as well as in other parts of Pakistan, Afghanistan and Iran.
