= Jamshid Khan (politician) =

Pakistani politician

Member of the Provincial Assembly of Khyber Pakhtunkhwa
- In office 13 August 2018 – 18 January 2023
- Constituency: PK-55 (Mardan-VIII)
- In office August 2013 – 28 May 2018
- Constituency: PK-27 Mardan-V

Personal details
- Party: PTI (2025-present)
- Other political affiliations: PMLN (2018-2025); IND (2013-2018)
- Relations: Imran Khan Mohmand (brother)

Jamshid Khan Mohmand is a Pakistani politician who had been a member of the Provincial Assembly of Khyber Pakhtunkhwa from August 2018 till January 2023.

== Political career ==
He was elected to the Provincial Assembly of Khyber Pakhtunkhwa as an independent candidate from PK-27 Mardan-V in a 2013 by-election and filled the vacant seat of his brother, Imran Khan Mohmand, who was killed in a suicide bombing on 18 June 2013. Jamshid received 26,699 votes and defeated Fazal Rabbani, a candidate of Jamaat-e-Islami (JI).

He was re-elected to the Provincial Assembly of Khyber Pakhtunkhwa as a candidate of Pakistan Muslim League (N) (PML(N)) from PK-55 (Mardan-VIII) in the 2018 Khyber Pakhtunkhwa provincial election.
