= Tarikh-i-Khan-Jahani =

17th-century text about Pashtun history

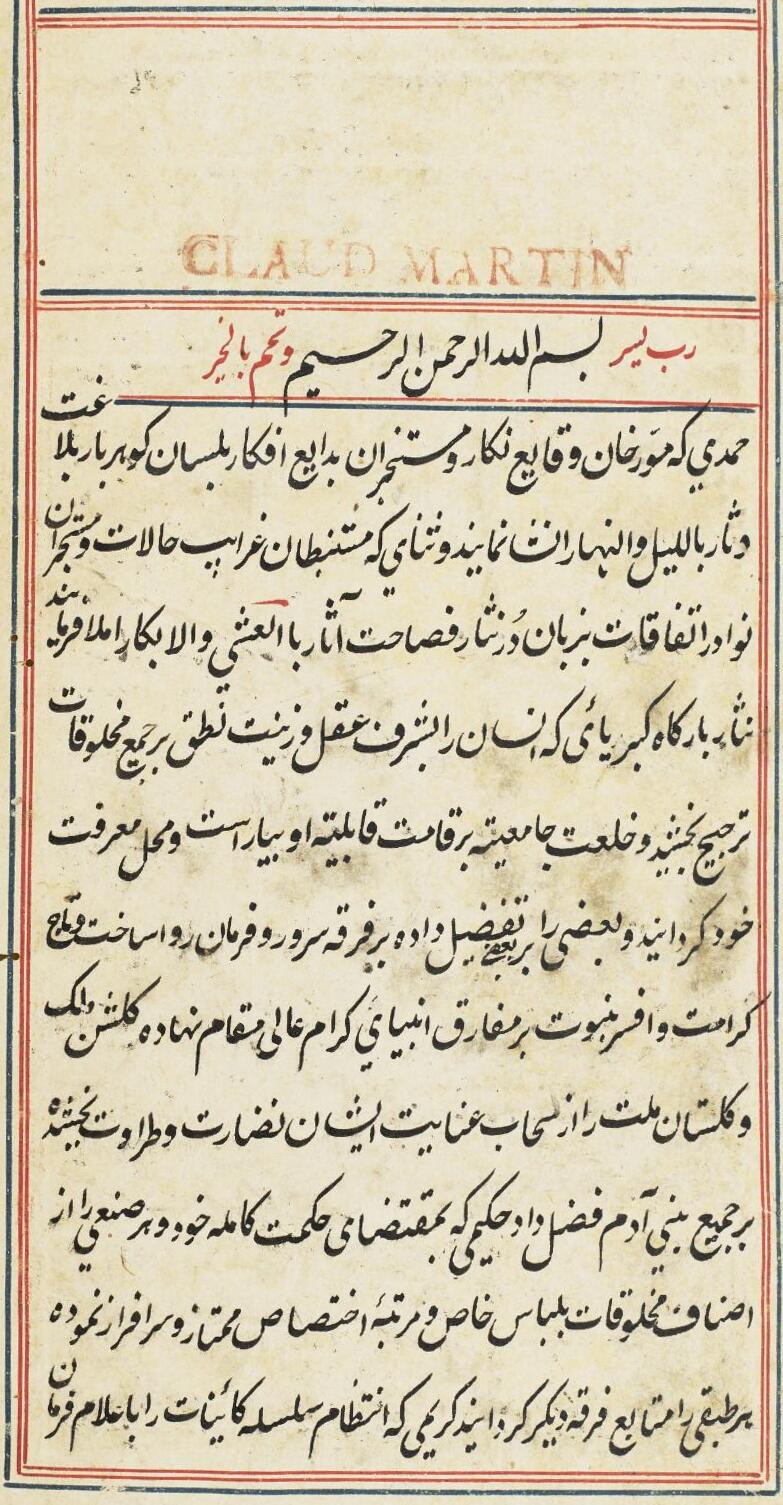
Incipit of a 1796 manuscript copy of Makhzan-i-Afghani, featuring a basmala. Created in Lucknow for Claude Martin by Shaykh Niẓām al-Dīn Nawkar Ṣāḥib. Held in the John Rylands Library.

The Tarikh-i-Khan-Jahani (lit. 'The Khan Jahan's History') is a 17th-century Persian language text describing the history of the ethnic Afghans. Versions of the work are referred to by the names Makhzan-i-Afghani (lit. 'Afghan Treasury') and Tarikh-i-Khan Jahani Wa Makhzan-i-Afghani. It was sponsored by Khan Jahan Lodi, a high-ranking noble of the Mughal emperor Jahangir, and its principal author was Nimat Allah al-Harawi, a waqia-navis (news-writer) serving the Mughal Empire. It represents the earliest comprehensive history of the Afghans, and the first to tackle their ethnogenesis, codifying several oral histories of the Afghan community. It also contains a biography of Khan Jahan Lodi. The work served as the basis for subsequent written histories of the Afghans.

== Writing ==
Commissioned by the Indo-Afghan courtier Khan Jahan Lodi, the Tarikh-i-Khan-Jahani was the first major historical work that aimed to present a full history of the Afghan people, with an objective of defining their origins. Previous works on the Afghans were political histories, written mostly about the Lodis and the Surs. In the view of Nile Green, the work was an attempt to situate Afghan identity in the Mughal court, and was one of several works written as a response to the "competitive encounter" between different ethnic groups at the Mughal court. One work post-dating the Tarikh-Khan-Jahani, named the Mirat-i-Aftab-numa, recounts that Khan Jahan Lodi decided to commission the Tarikh when an Iranian envoy to the court called Afghans the descendants of the jinn (devils).

The work was principally written by Nimat Allah al-Harawi, a waqia-navis (newswriter) of Iranian descent in the Mughal Empire, but may have been based on substantial material previously formulated by Haybat Khan Kakar, an Afghan from Samana who served as an attendant of Khan Jahan Lodi. The Tarikh also involved the input of several assistants and informants, similar to other written histories of the era. Sections on the history of different Afghan ruling dynasties mostly drew from previous written sources, while the information on Afghan tribal lineages largely drew from oral histories that circulated among the Afghan diaspora in the early 17th century. The Tarikh-i-Khan-Jahani is an example of the Mughal court's Persianizing effect on different tribal leaders who had been assimilated into the imperial fold, reflected by the choice of tarikh (Persian chronicling) as the medium for this early history of the Pashtuns over their native language of Pashto. Previous written histories sponsored by Mughal rulers served as the text's immediate models.

The Tarikh-i-Khan-Jahani was completed around 1613. Shortly after its initial conception, it was abridged into a version termed the Makhzan-i-Afghani (lit. 'Afghan Treasury').

== Content ==
The major portion of the Tarikh-i-Khan-Jahani is dedicated to Afghan history. The Tarikh begins its history within the ethnogenesis of the Afghans, tracing the Afghan genealogy upto Yaqub the Jewish patriarch, and describes his eventual eastward migration to Afghanistan. It describes the subsequent life of Qais Abdur Rashid as the primogenitor of the Afghans, asserting that he was converted to Islam by the Prophet Muhammad and fought alongside him. The Tarikh continues the history of the Afghans upto the 17th century, and includes details on the Afghan dynasties of Delhi, namely the Lodis and Suris. The content presented in the historical portion focuses as much as it does on the glory days of Afghan political power, as it does on the tribal roots of the Afghan people and the early days of Afghan settlement in the Indian subcontinent. The khatimah (conclusion) of the Tarikh details the lives of several Afghan Sufi shaikhs (saints).

The Tarikh contains a biography of its patron Khan Jahan Lodi, which is a lengthy chapter containing five fasls (sections). This section describes Khan Jahan Lodi's ancestry, how his forebears migrated from Afghanistan to the Indian subcontinent during Lodi rule, his clan's struggles after the fall of Afghan rule in the subcontinent, and the induction of Khan Jahan Lodi's father into Mughal service.

A key theme of the Tarikh is its emphasis of tribe as the main marker of Afghan identity; this is the organising principle in the Tarikh's formulation of genealogy. For example, the Tarikh was set apart from the literary norms of its time in presenting the entries on Afghan Sufi shaikhs by tribal lineage rather than Sufi lineage. It classified all the saints as belonging to the Sarbani, Bettani, or Ghurghushti tribes, rather than Sufi orders such as Chishtiyya, Naqshbandiyya, or Qadiriyya.

== Legacy ==
The Tarikh-i-Khan-Jahani became highly influential during the Mughal Empire's eclipse in the 18th century, as several Indo-Afghan successor states emerged and questions of genealogy became important. Manuscript copies were made of both the Tarikh and its abridged version, the Makhzan. Some manuscripts had chapters and reference material added. During this period, many newer histories were sponsored by Afghan notables which drew on the Tarikh, such as the Khulasat al-ansab, Risala dar ansab-i-Afghanan, and Tawarikh-i-Afghani. The same century saw a Pashto-language translation of the Tarikh-i-Khan Jahani, which appeared as the first section of a history titled Tarikh-i-murassa by Afzal Khan Khattak.

In the 19th century, the Tarikh-i-Khan-Jahani attained colonial importance as the British sought to learn about the Afghans. For example, the work served as a basis for the Hayat-i-Afghani of Muhammad Hayat Khan compiled for the British administration, and a number of colonial scholars collected manuscripts of the Tarikh-i-Khan-Jahani. In 1839, the German orientalist Bernhard Dorn published the most substantial English translation of the Makhzan-i-Afghani. The theory of the Afghans' origins from the Lost Tribes of Israel propounded by the Tarikh-i-Khan-Jahani was a popular topic in orientalist thought during the 19th century.

== See also ==
- Tarikh-i-Sher Shahi
