= Twenty-fifth Amendment to the Constitution of Pakistan =

2018 amendment to the Pakistani constitution

Constitution (Twenty-fifth Amendment) Act, 2018

Parliament of Pakistan
- Long title: An Act further to amend the Constitution of the Islamic Republic of Pakistan.
- Passed: In National Assembly: May 24, 2018; In Senate: May 25, 2018; In Provincial Assembly of Khyber Pakhtunkhwa: May 27, 2018
- Assented to: May 31, 2018

Legislative history
- Bill title: The Constitution (Twenty-fifth Amendment) Bill, 2018
- Bill citation: 31st Amendment Bill
- Introduced by: Chaudhry Mehmood Bashir (law minister)
- Status: In force

The Twenty-fifth Amendment to the Constitution of Pakistan was passed by the Parliament of Pakistan and the Khyber Pakhtunkhwa Assembly in May 2018. Under the amendment, the Federally Administered Tribal Areas (FATA) and Provincially Administered Tribal Areas (PATA) were to be merged with the province of Khyber Pakhtunkhwa (KP).

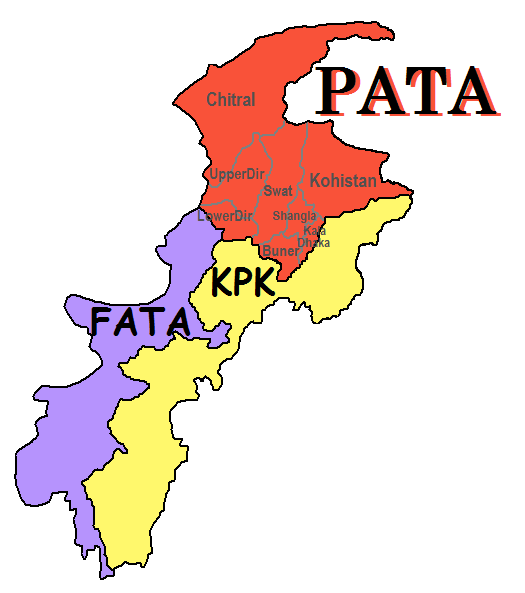
Khyber Pakhtunkhwa, FATA and PATA before merger

== Background ==
FATA and Khyber Pakhtunkhwa (formerly known as the North-West Frontier Province)

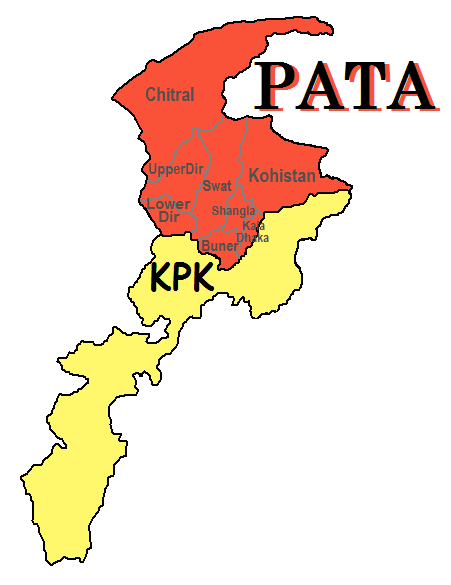
Provincially Administered Tribal Areas (PATA) and KPK before Twenty-fifth Amendment

Since the independence of Pakistan from the United Kingdom in 1947, the seven districts of the Federally Administered Tribal Areas were governed by political officers appointed by the President of Pakistan. The PA had near absolute power over their tribal districts.

Efforts to merge FATA with Khyber Pakhtunkhwa date back decades. Former President Pervez Musharraf considered the integration of FATA with the rest of the country by way of a version of the Local Governance Ordinance, 2001 with an extended geographic scope, as well as through the Political Parties Act, 2002.

On December 14, 2016, the Khyber Pakhtunkhwa Assembly adopted a resolution in favour of merging FATA with Khyber Pakhtunkhwa with the goal of infrastructure rehabilitation and reconstruction.

Recommendations to bring FATA on par with the rest of the country were approved by the federal cabinet on March 2, 2017, and on December 26, 2017, the cabinet approved the formation of the National Implementation Committee on FATA Reforms, including the Minister of Defence and Commander 11 Corps.

Spearheaded by Sartaj Aziz, the committee's comprehensive work and tour of FATA expedited the process of merger. The Aziz-led committee's findings were in favour of a complete merger, rather than piecemeal mainstreaming. The drafting of the bill itself was based in the Ministry of Law, involving Attorney-General Ashtar Ausaf Ali and Asad Rahim Khan.

The Supreme Court and High Court (Extension of Jurisdiction to Federally Administered Tribal Areas) Act, 2018, assented to by President Mamnoon Hussain on April 18, 2018, extended the jurisdiction of the Supreme Court of Pakistan and the Peshawar High Court to the Federally Administered Tribal Areas.

== Details ==
The Constitution (Twenty-fifth Amendment) Act, 2018, seeks to amend Article 1 of the Constitution, where the country's territory is defined and FATA is mentioned as a territory separate from the other four provinces. It also amends Articles 51 and 59, which concern the allocation of seats in national and provincial assemblies for each of the federating administrative units. Articles 106, 155, and 246 are amended by the act, and 247 is repealed.

The amendment effectively abolishes the Frontier Crimes Regulation (FCR). A US$865 million package will be allocated to a 10-year plan aimed at the rehabilitation and reconstruction of infrastructure in the tribal areas alongside changes to the constitution.

The amendment will reduce the Senate from 104 to 96 members, and the National Assembly from 342 to 336 members. The Khyber Pakhtunkhwa Assembly will have 145 seats (115 general, 26 reserved for women, and 4 reserved for minorities); FATA will have 21 seats within the KP Assembly (16 general, 4 reserved for women, and 1 reserved for non-Muslims). The incumbent senators for FATA will be allowed to complete their six-year terms. After they have all retired by 2024, there will be no separate representation of FATA within the Senate.

== Legislative procedure ==
=== National Assembly ===
The amendment was passed in the National Assembly on May 24, 2018, with a 229-1 vote in favour. Jamiat Ulema-e Islam (F) (JUI-F) and Pakhtunkhwa Milli Awami Party (PkMAP) lawmakers walked out from the assembly before the vote. Dawar Kundi of Pakistan Tehreek-e-Insaf (PTI) was the sole dissenting voter. During the session, Imran Khan, the chief of PTI, addressed the house, congratulating parliament on uniting despite party differences and bringing up rigging, money laundering, and the Panama Papers. Prime Minister Shahid Khaqan Abbasi spoke afterwards, criticising Khan for bring up unrelated issues in his speech.

=== Senate ===
On May 25, 2018, the amendment was passed by the Senate with a 71-5 vote in favour. The five voters against were members of the Pakhtunkhwa Milli Awami Party. A walkout staged by members of the party was held.

=== Khyber Pakhtunkhwa Assembly ===
Since Article 239(4) of the Constitution requires constitutional amendments affecting geographic boundaries to be approved by the assembly of the affected province, the bill for the Twenty-fifth Amendment must be passed by the KP assembly with a two-thirds vote before its term expiry on May 28, 2018.

On 27 May 2018, Twenty-fifth Amendment to the Constitution of Pakistan was passed with majority in the Khyber Pakhtunkhwa Assembly. Total of 83 votes was needed for the bill to be approved. The vote was 87 in favour of the amendment for the FATA/K-P merger.

=== Presidential assent ===
On May 28, 2018, President Mamnoon Hussain signed the FATA Interim Governance Regulation, 2018, abolishing the Frontier Crimes Regulation and outlining how FATA will be governed within a two-year time frame as the region is merged with Khyber Pakhtunkhwa. The FATA Interim Governance Regulation has been signed under Article 247 of the Constitution of Pakistan, which stands to be repealed by the Thirty-first Amendment to the Constitution. Sources privy to a series of meetings since the passage of the bill in the Khyber Pakhtunkhwa Assembly have stated that the repeal of Article 247 of the Constitution wasn't included in the proposed amendment until the last minute, and that the FATA Interim Governance Regulation will have "little legal standing" after changes are made to the constitution. The abolition of Article 247 could also introduce difficulty upholding the Action in Aid of Civil Power, the Nizam-e-Adal Regulation, the policing authority of federal and provincial levies, and tax amnesty provided to FATA.

On May 29, 2018, Senate Chairman Sadiq Sanjrani signed and forwarded the constitutional bill to President Mamnoon Hussain. Having been received by the Senate from the Ministry of Law and Justice after its passage in the Khyber Pakhuntkhwa Assembly, the bill was sent for the President's signature. Presidential assent was given on May 31.

== Criticism ==
The government of Afghanistan criticised the merger, stating that the merger would be a contravention of the Treaty of Rawalpindi between Afghanistan and British India. Pakistan responded to the government of Afghanistan's position by rejecting the accusation that the merger was a "one-sided" decision.

Dr. Farooq Sattar of the Muttahida Qaumi Movement (MQM) stated that his party supports the bill for "political unity," but his party would still prefer that FATA be made a separate province rather than be merged with Khyber Pakhtunkhwa. He called for the formation of 19 provinces, referencing bills MQM had previously put forth proposing the creation of South Punjab, Hazara, and FATA provinces. Sattar demanded a referendum on whether FATA should be made a new province instead of being merged with Khyber Pakhtunkhwa.

Jamiat Ulema-e Islam (F) activists protested against the merger at the Khyber Pakhtunkhwa Assembly, attempting to stop lawmakers from entering the building.

Pakhtunkhwa Milli Awami Party leader Abdul Qahar Khan Wadan defended his party's position against the merger and stated that the people of FATA want their own province, chief minister, governor, and public service commission.

Leaders of the FATA Grand Alliance (FGA) called the merger "forced and unjustifiable".
