= Zurmat =

Zurmat زرمت
- Location in Afghanistan
- Coordinates: 33.3301°N 69.1924°E
- Country: Afghanistan
- Province: Paktia Province
- District: Zurmat District
- Elevation: 2,207 m (7,241 ft)

Population
  - Ethnicities: Pashtuns
- Time zone: UTC+4:30

Zurmat (Pashto: زرمت) is the main town of Zurmat District in Paktia Province, Afghanistan. Zurmat is the largest city of Paktia Province, while Zurmat District, with a population of 109,805, is also the most populous district of the province.

== See also ==
- Khost
- Loya Paktia
