= Imran Khan Mohmand =

Pakistani politician

Imran Khan Mohmand MPA

Member of the Khyber Pakhtunkhwa Assembly
- In office 31 May 2013 – 18 June 2013
- Succeeded by: Jamshid Khan
- Constituency: PK-27 (Mardan-V)

Personal details
- Died: 18 June 2013 Shergarh, Mardan District
- Party: Pakistan Tehreek-e-Insaf
- Relatives: Jamshid Khan (brother)
- Occupation: Politician

Imran Khan Mohmand (died June 18, 2013) was a Pakistani politician who was elected as a member of the Provincial Assembly of Khyber Pakhtunkhwa in 2013, from PK-27 (Mardan-V). He was previously a member of the Awami National Party. He contested as an independent candidate in the 2013 general election. He joined the Pakistan Tehreek-e-Insaf government upon being elected to the assembly.

== Death ==
On June 18, 2013, he was killed during a bombing at a funeral in Mardan. The attack was possibly an assassination. He was the second member of the newly elected Khyber Pakhtunkhwa assembly to be killed, following the targeted assassination of Farid Khan weeks earlier.
