= Khan Jahan Lodi =

Afghan noble

Salabat Khan Khan Jahan Lodi
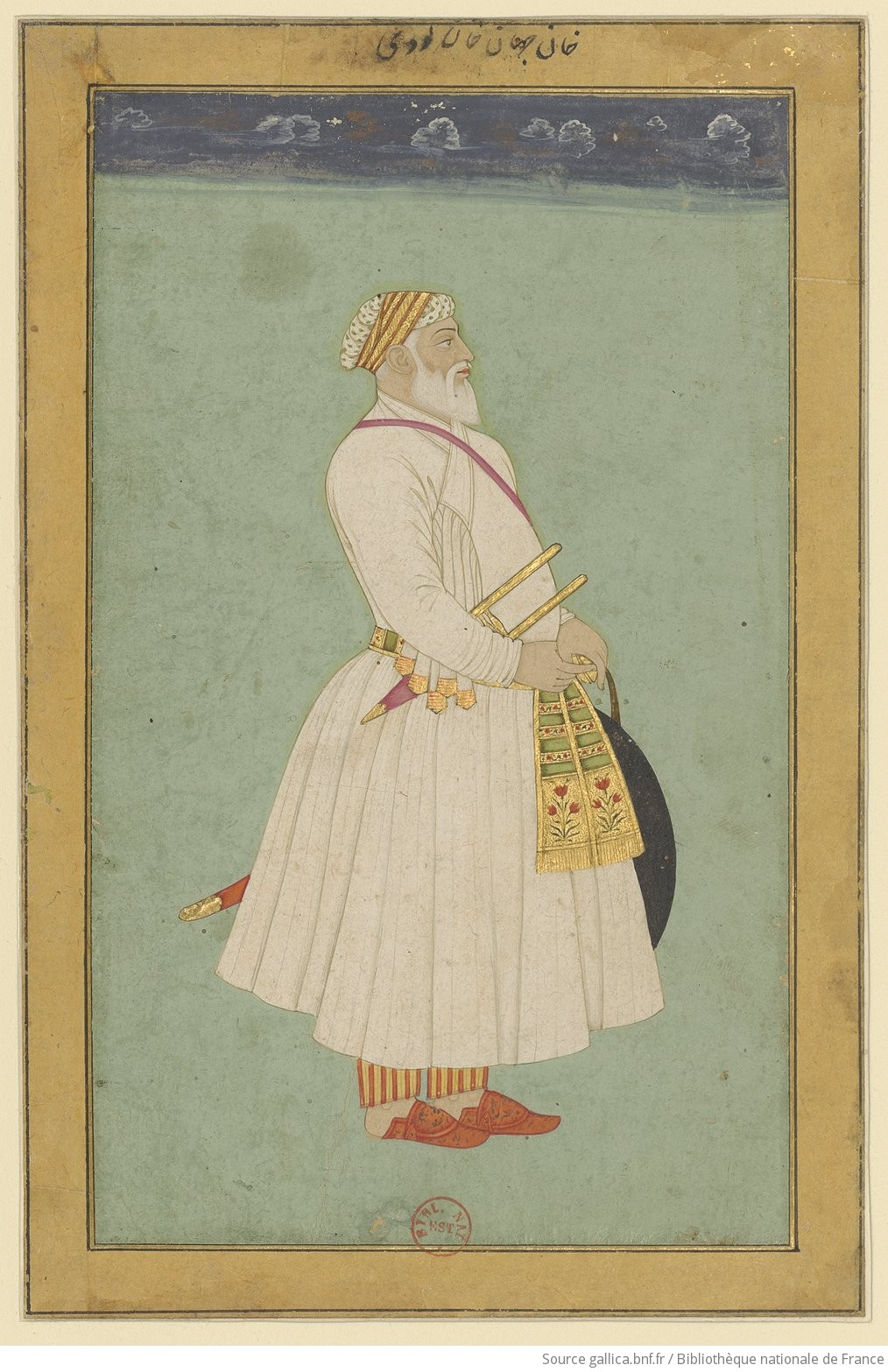
- A portrait of Lodi from Bibliothèque nationale de France

Governor of the Deccan
- In office 1609-? 1626-?
- Monarch: Jahangir

Governor of Multan
- In office 1620–?
- Monarch: Jahangir

Governor of Malwa
- In office 1629
- Monarch: Shah Jahan

Personal details
- Born: Pir Khan
- Died: 3 February 1631 Sihanda, Central India
- Relations: Muhammad Khan (brother)
- Children: Asalat Khan; Aziz; Farid; Muzaffar; Alam; Ahmad; Jahan
- Parent: Daulat Khan Lodi (father)

Military service
- Battles/wars: Mughal conquest of Bengal

Pir Khan (died 3 February 1631), known by the name Khan Jahan Lodi, was an ethnic Afghan (Note: This article uses Afghan in a historical sense to refer to the Pashtun people. This is not to be confused with the modern denonym for residents of the country Afghanistan.) who served as a noble of the Mughal Empire. Entering the Mughal service during the reign of Mughal emperor Akbar, he enjoyed a meteoric rise under emperor Jahangir, becoming one of the empire's highest-ranking nobles. Lodi was the leading example of Afghan recruitment during Jahangir's reign, as Jahangir attempted to conciliate this group that was hitherto hostile to Mughal rule. Khan Jahan Lodi fell out of imperial favour with the accession of Shah Jahan and rebelled against the ruler, resulting in his capture and execution in the early 1630s. His rebellion was a major event of Shah Jahan's early rule. During his lifetime, Khan Jahan Lodi sponsored the Tarikh-i-Khan-Jahani, a written ethno-history of the Afghans which was highly influential on subsequent works about the topic.

== Origins ==
Khan Jahan Lodi, originally named Pir Khan, was the son of Daulat Khan Lodi, a minor noble during the reign of Akbar. According to his biography in the Tarikh-i-Khan-Jahani, he was descended from a clan in the region of Roh in present-day Pakistan and Afghanistan, (Note: According to Ferreira, 'Roh' in historical chronicles has referred at times to specific markers such as the Gomal River, but at other times has referred to large swathes of land in Pakistan and Afghanistan.) and his ancestors migrated to the Indian subcontinent during the rule of Sikandar Lodi. They subsequently served in the offices and military of different Indian rulers, facing difficulties from the fall of the Lodi dynasty. On the other hand, the emperor Jahangir in his memoir Tuzuk-i-Jahangiri identifies Khan Jahan Lodi as a descendant of Daulat Khan Lodi, a governor of Lahore who betrayed the Lodi dynasty by inviting the conquest of the first Mughal ruler Babur. Jahangir's assessment may have been incorrect or fabricated to justify the promotions that Khan Jahan Lodi was receiving under his rule.

Pir Khan spent a number of his formative years in the Deccan, while his father served under two consecutive Mughal governors of the region (Abdul Rahim Khan-i-Khanan and prince Daniyal).

== Career ==
=== Reign of Akbar ===
During the rule of Mughal emperor Akbar, Pir Khan participated in the final stages of the conquest of Bengal, fighting under the command of Raja Man Singh. He later became a favourite of prince Daniyal. In the period 1599–1604, prince Salim (later emperor Jahangir) staged a rebellion against Akbar from Allahabad. During this time he attempted to court Pir Khan's employment, and between 1600 and 1603 the latter threatened to leave Daniyal's service in the Deccan multiple times. He did not follow through, due to his connections in the Deccan and multiple gifts from Daniyal. This was part of a larger effort on Salim's part to recruit Afghans to his cause, on account of their hostility to Akbar's rule; Salim's interest in Pir Khan convinced other Afghans to join his cause. Following Daniyal's death, Pir Khan entered the service of Abdul Rahim Khan-i-Khanan.

=== Reign of Jahangir ===
Salim ascended the throne as emperor Jahangir in 1605, following which Pir Khan was summoned to the court. Presenting himself to the emperor at Lahore in April 1607, he was soon after awarded the title "Salabat Khan" (lit. 'The Steadfast Khan') and had his rank raised to 3000 zat and 1500 sowar. A year later, he had his rank further raised to 5000 zat and 5000 sowar, and awarded the title 'Khan-i-Jahan' (lit. 'Khan of the world'). The Tarikh-i-Khan-Jahani attributes these imperial favours to the increasing closeness between Khan Jahan Lodi and the emperor. He was even allowed audience with the emperor in the gusalkhana (bath), an honour granted to only a few trusted nobles.

From 1609, Khan Jahan Lodi served as governor of the Deccan, an important position. In 1611, he was deputed to lead an army against the Nizam Shahi city of Daulatabad, but failed to capture it. In 1620, his influence increased when he was appointed governor of Multan. During his tenure, Qandahar was captured by the Safavids in 1622. After the fall of Qandahar, a number of Afghan tribesmen approached Khan Jahan Lodi and offered their support in leading a retaliation against the Safavids. Khan Jahan Lodi refused, fearing imperial backlash at the idea of Afghan forces clustering under his name. He did advise Jahangir to immediately send an army to recover Qandahar, but this did not come to fruition. He was deputed to guard Agra during the rebellion of prince Khurram. Around 1624, he replaced the noble Mahabat Khan as guardian of the prince Parvez at Burhanpur. In 1626, he was once again appointed as governor of the Deccan. Taking advantage of political chaos in the final years of Jahangir, he colluded with the Nizam Shahi ruler and handed over the Balaghat region of the Deccan, receiving 3,00,000 huns in exchange.

Khan Jahan Lodi's successful career during Jahangir's rule was unprecedented for an Afghan, and controversial among the Mughal elite. He was the highest ranking Afghan, and one of the highest ranking nobles of the empire; he had managed to reach a rank of 6000 zat and 6000 sawar, the second-highest rank of that era. Historian John F, Richards notes that Jahangir held him in great confidence despite his minimal political/military accomplishments. Scholars have explained Khan Jahan Lodi's rise as part of Jahangir's strategy to conciliate and recruit Afghans into the Mughal imperial system. This group was hostile to Mughal rule in Akbar's time, and participated in key rebellions. Jahangir may have hoped that Khan Jahan Lodi's example would improve the Afghan view of the Mughal ruling system. Khan Jahan Lodi was not the only Afghan noble who was inducted into the imperial fold, but high appointments were rare. Historian Munis D. Faruqui notes that Khan Jahan Lodi's connections with Afghan networks in the empire were what prevented Afghan rebellion during the later years of Jahangir's rule.

=== Accession of Shah Jahan and death (1628-1631) ===
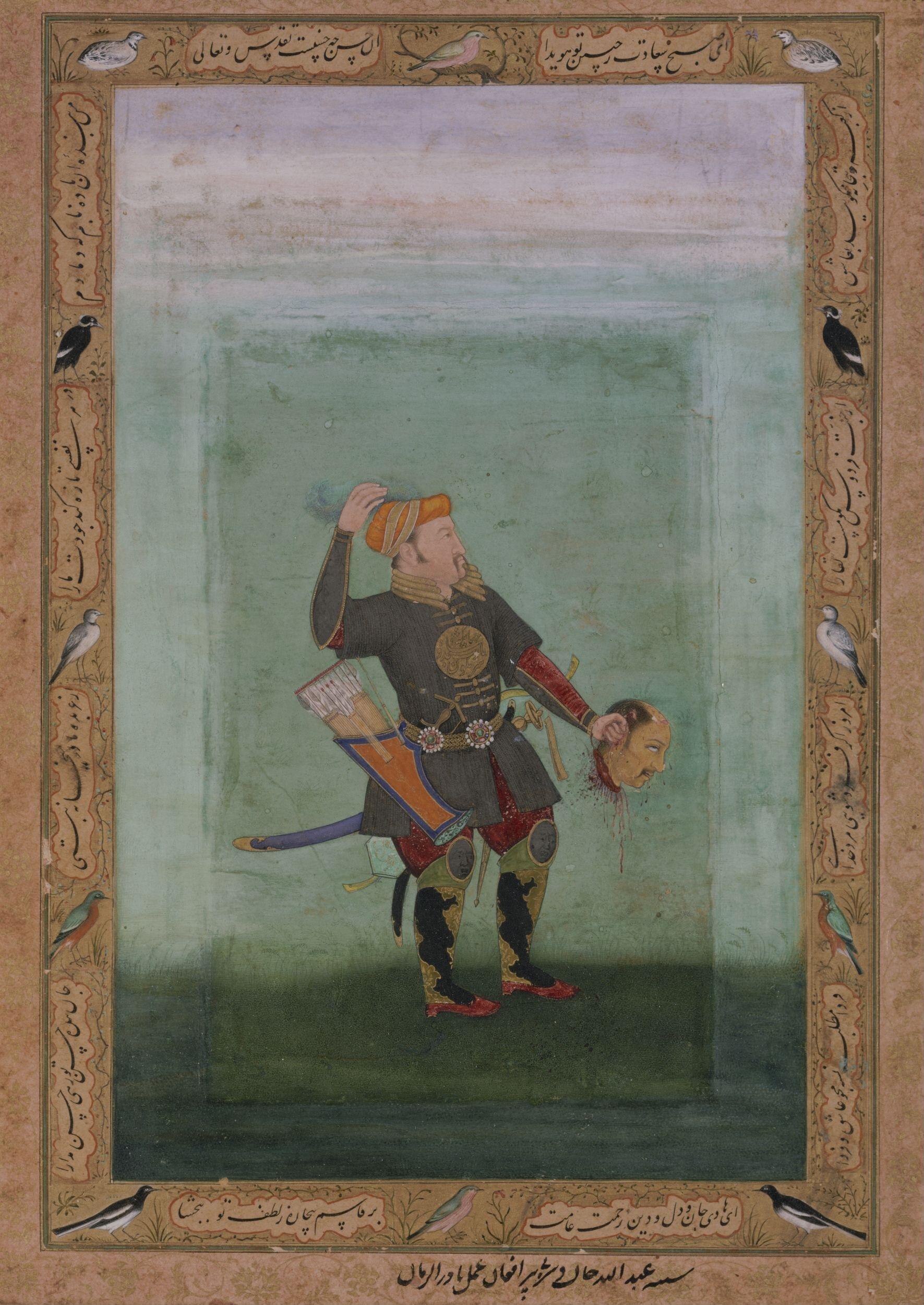
Painting, Abdullah Khan Firoz Jang with the head of Khan-i Jahan Lodi, by Abu'l-Hasan, c. 1631, Victoria and Albert Museum

Jahangir died in 1627, leading to a war of succession among his sons. During this time, Prince Khurram approached Khan Jahan Lodi at Malwa, seeking his support, but Lodi declined and did not participate in the war. This was perceived as an insult given that Lodi had no competing allegiance with any other prince. Khurram emerged victorious in the succession and was made emperor Shah Jahan, following which he continued to view Khan Jahan Lodi as a potential threat to his kingship. He deputed Khan Jahan Lodi to recover the territories surrendered to the Nizam Shahis, but the latter met with failure. In 1629 Lodi presented himself at the royal court, where Shah Jahan asked him to let go of some of his retinue. Khan Jahan Lodi spent eight terse months at court, nominally serving as governor of Malwa, until October 1629 when he fled for the Deccan, accompanied by some of his followers. He was declared a rebel and pursued by Mughal forces, he survived a battle near Dholpur by the Chambal River, but several of his relatives and his retinue perished. With his two remaining sons, and the aid of Jhujhar Singh Bundela, he reached the court of Murtaza Nizam Shah II, who accepted him and made him commander of the Nizam Shahi armies. He was deputed to clear Mughal insurgency from the Berar and Balaghat regions.

Granting political asylum to a rebel Mughal noble was a serious challenge to Mughal authority that Shah Jahan could not tolerate. He deputed three armies totalling 50,000 troops southwards against the Nizam Shahis, and followed suit by moving his court to Burhanpur. Khan Jahan Lodi commanded 40,000 troops. A number of destructive clashes followed, which aggravated the Deccan famine of 1630–1632. Khan Jahan Lodi's influence among Afghans of the subcontinent led to political upheaval at the north-west frontier, where Afghans threatened to capture Peshawar, but this was suppressed by Mughal forces. In 1630, Khan Jahan Lodi suffered a serious defeat and fled towards the Punjab, pursued by various Mughal forces. His companion Darya Rohilla Khan was slain; Khan Jahan Lodi escaped and continued to flee, but on 1 February 1631 he was cornered and killed by a Rajput officer named Madho Singh in Sihanda, a place in central India. After his death, his head was cut off and sent to Burhanpur, where it was received by Shah Jahan during a boat ride on the Tapti River.

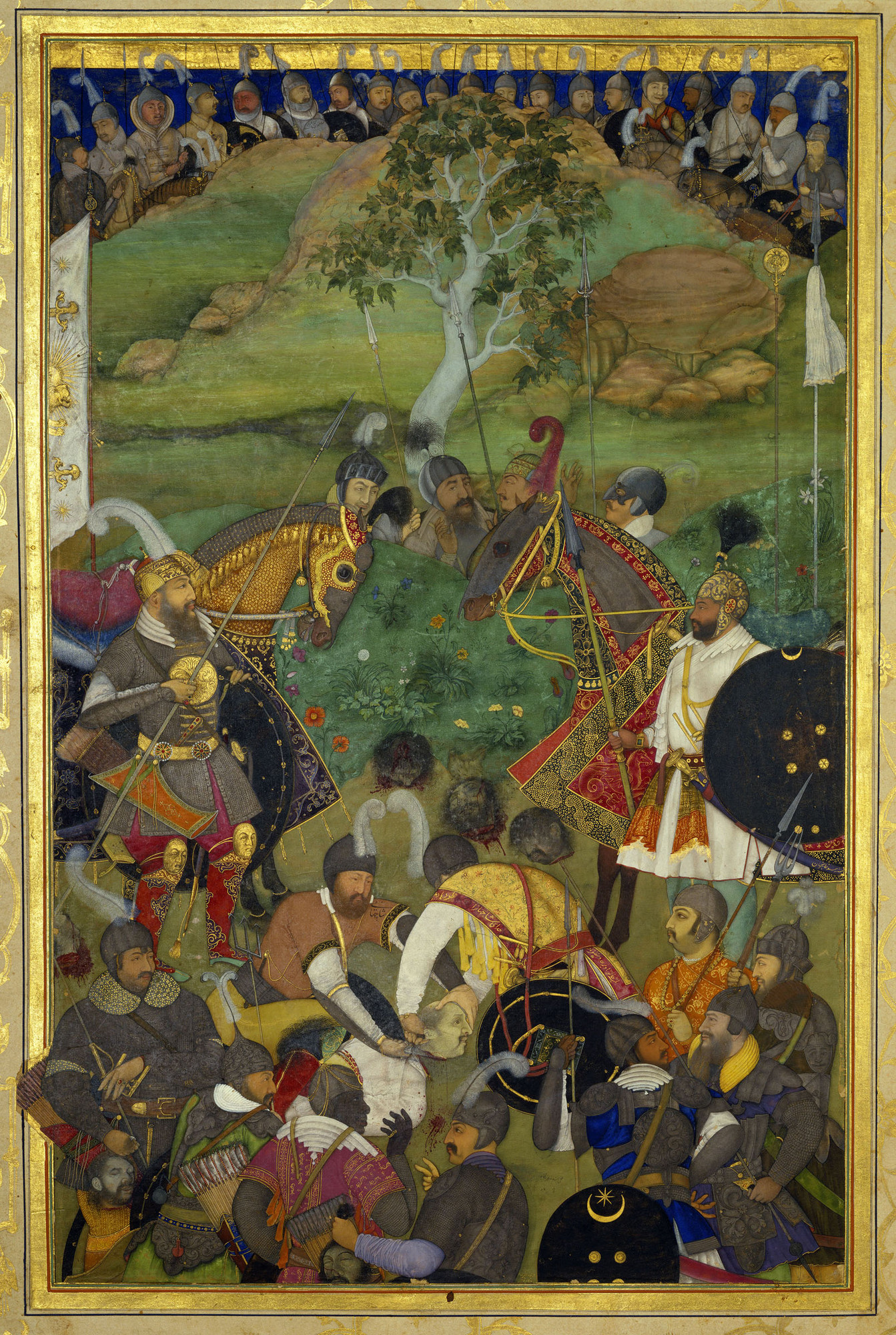
The Decapitation of Khan Jahan Lodi, from a manuscript of the Padshahnama, painted by Abid, c. 1633, held in the Royal Collection

John F. Richards has characterised Khan Jahan Lodi's rebellion as one of the most serious from a noble in Mughal history, albeit successfully quelled.

== Personal life ==
Khan Jahan Lodi had an elder brother named Muhammad Khan, and a sister; Muhammad Khan was killed in the Deccan while serving under prince Daniyal. He had many sons, some of whom were killed during his rebellion; some of his sons included Aziz and Farid. He was a Sunni Muslim, and held an interest in Sufism. He was a charismatic individual, which may have helped facilitate his popularity with Jahangir. His son Asalat Khan, who was made prisoner during his father's rebellion, died in Daulatabad. His other sons Farid and Jahan were also made prisoner. Three of his sons, Muzaffar, Alam and Ahmad also fled, but later came back and submitted to the imperial court. During the height of his career as a noble of Jahangir, he sponsored a work of history in the Persian language titled Tarikh-i-Khan-Jahani (lit. 'The Khan Jahan's History'), written by Nimat Allah al-Harawi, which described the ethnogenesis of the Afghans. This work was the first systematic attempt to present the history of the Afghans, and inspired several later Persian-language histories in the genre. The work includes a biography of Khan Jahan Lodi himself.

== Bibliography ==
- Chandra, Satish (2005). Medieval India: from Sultanat to the Mughals - Part II (Revised ed.). New Delhi: Har-Anand Publications. ISBN 978-81-241-1064-5.
- Faruqui, Munis D (2012), Princes of the Mughal Empire, 1504-1719, Cambridge: Cambridge University Press, ISBN 978-1-139-52619-7, OCLC 808366461
