= Shoukat Aziz =

Pakistani human rights activist (born 1996)

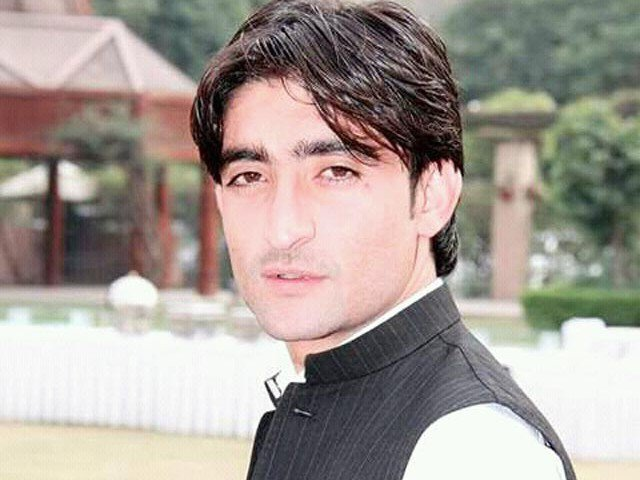
- Born: 1996 (age 29–30); Daya Tribal Area, Kurram District, Federally Administered Tribal Areas, Pakistan
- Education: University of Peshawar
- Occupation: Pakistani Human Rights Activist

Shoukat Aziz (Urdu: شوکت عزیز; born 1996) is a Pakistani human rights activist known for abolishing the Frontier Crimes Regulation and co-founding the youth rights group FATA Youth Organization (FYO). He advocates for students' rights, human rights, and minority tribal rights, with a particular emphasis on the rights of those living in the Federally Administrated Tribal Areas (FATA) of Pakistan. He was responsible for abolishing the Frontier Crimes Regulation, a group of laws which had long been denounced by international human rights activists.

== Education ==
Shoukat Aziz was born in Daya Tribal Area, Kurram District, into the Chamkani Khanikhel tribe in 1996. As a child he was keenly aware of injustice and was noted for his intelligence. When Aziz turned seven, his parents sent him to live with his uncles in the Saddar area of Peshawar (in Kyber Pakhtunkhwa Province), in order for him to receive a higher quality education than he would have had access to in the Tribal Autonomous Zone.

Aziz began his activism while he was a student at the Government College of Peshawar, which he attended from 2011 to 2013. Together with Abdul Rahim, Umar Orakzai, and Halim Orakzai, Aziz founded the FYO at the age of sixteen. He created it in direct response to the unequal access to education that children and youths in the Tribal Autonomous Zone of Pakistan were receiving, as well as to address structural inequalities that ethnically Pashtun youth face, such as discrimination, lack of access to schooling, and lack of resources due to political corruption. Shoukat Aziz brought egregious schooling conditions to the attention of the press, including students' assigned schools being over 10 miles away and across mountain ranges, school buildings being dilapidated or used to house farm animals, teachers receiving salary but not arriving at schools to teach, and schools not existing where the government claimed schools had been built.

Originally, the FYO was named the FATA Students' Organization (FSO), but the name was changed to encompass all youth, not just students. Aziz, and through him the FYO, focused on their efforts on advancing the rights of Pashtun and tribal youth, which are minority groups that are heavily discriminated against within Pakistan. He and the FYO also worked to advance women's and girls' rights.

From 2014 to 2018 Aziz attended the University of Peshawar, studying Political Science.

== Political activism ==
During his time in university, Aziz mostly focused his efforts on abolishing the Frontier Crimes Regulation (FCR), a set of laws that were put in place under British rule which specifically discriminated against the minority groups living within the FATA area. The law stated that three basic rights are not applicable to the residents of FATA – appeal, wakeel and daleel (the right to request a change to a conviction in any court, the right to legal representation and the right to present reasoned evidence, respectively). Under the law, almost any citizen of a town where a crime was committed was at risk of collective arrest and punishment, judicial decisions were made by tribal elders rather than credentialed and elected officials, membership in political parties was banned, and politically motivated false prosecutions were common. Locally, the FCR was known as the "black law" for its draconian provisions.

To create political momentum, Aziz held rallies in protest of the FCR, demanding that the almost 150-year-old law be repealed. He shifted the entirety of his focus to putting pressure on the government to end the FCR in 2016. He shelved his women's rights and students' rights campaigns temporarily, reasoning that the FCR was so antithetical to human rights that it had to be repealed before any women, students, or ethnic minorities living in the FATA could begin to have rights at all. Until this time, both Aziz's regional government and the national government were fully behind Aziz's efforts, selecting him for the 2016 Malala Yousafzai National Peace Prize. After he began to lead peaceful protests and give speeches against the FCR, the support of the Pakistani government was tacitly withdrawn. The 2016 award ceremony for the Malala Yousafzai National Peace Prize was cancelled to avoid publicly awarding Aziz the National Peace Prize certificate, although the prize itself could not be taken back.

== Detention ==
On December 8, 2016, Aziz was detained by the police for chanting anti-FCR slogans in a protest he led.

The FYO held protests against the unlawful detention of Aziz until he was freed, six days later, on December 14.

== Further activism ==
Merging the FATA with the neighboring province of Khyber Pakhtunkhwa would solve the issue of the FATA being subject to the FCR. The former FATA areas would then be subject to all of Khyber Pakhtunkhwa's laws by virtue of not being a province. Under mounting pressure from Aziz and the FYO, the federal government agreed to go ahead with the merge, with the stipulation that it would not begin for five years. Aziz and the members of FATA were very dissatisfied with this proposal, and urged the government to merge immediately for the sake of human rights in the area.

Due to Aziz and the FYO's continued protests, the merger went through in 2018. After the FCR was repealed, Aziz turned his attention back to advocating for students' rights, human rights, and women's rights. He connects students with donors both internationally and within Pakistan, so that girls, disadvantaged students, and students from historically marginalized areas can continue to access education after grammar school despite facing cultural barriers.

== See also ==
- Human Rights in Pakistan
- Chamkani
- Frontier Crimes Regulation
- Federally Administered Tribal Areas
