= Zurmat District =

Coordinates: 33°33′N 68°25′E

Zurmat زرمت
- District
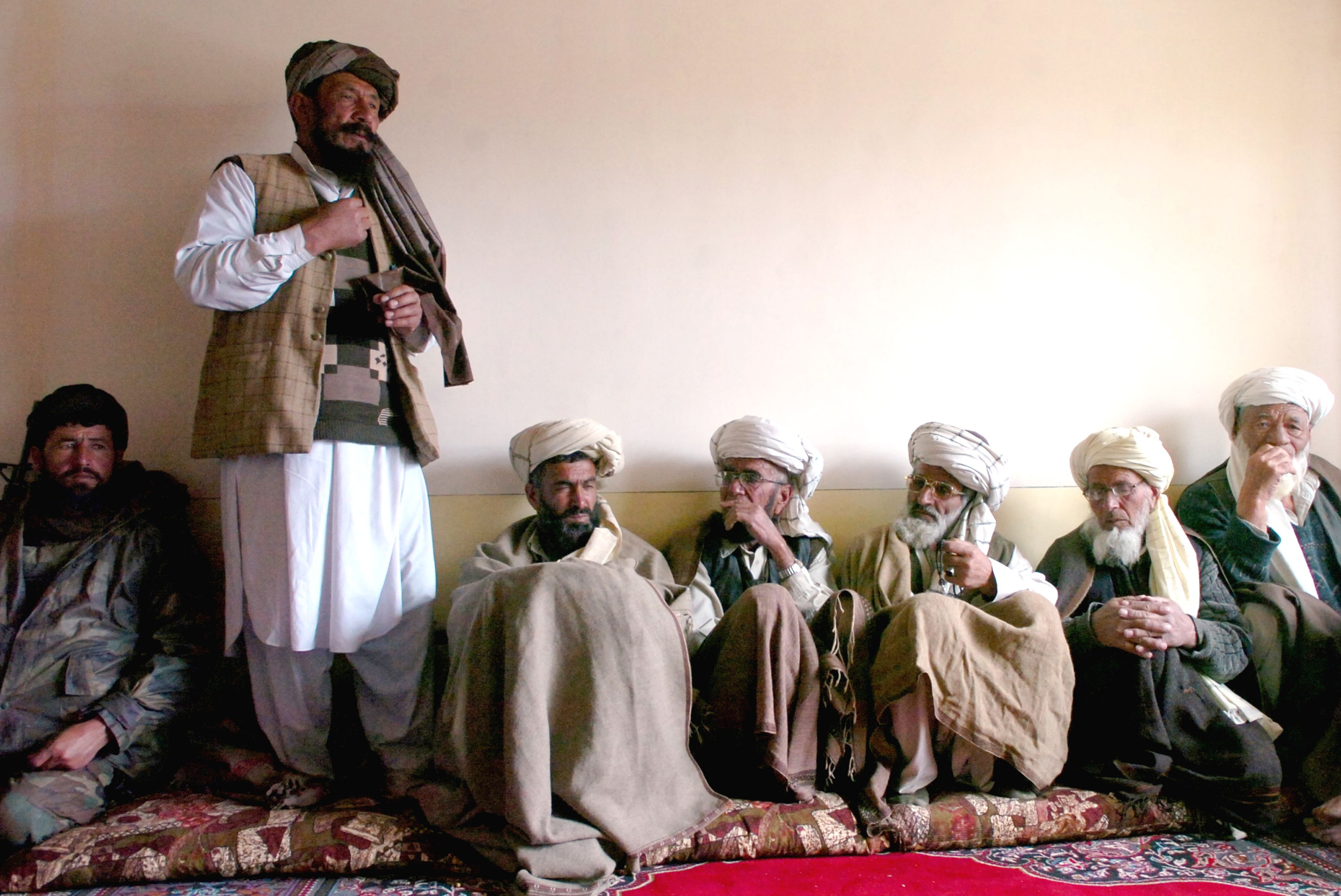
- Afghans in Zurmat district
- Interactive map of Zurmat
- Country: Afghanistan
- Province: Paktia
- People: Pashtuns
- Elevation: 2,100 m (6,900 ft)

Population
  - Total: 86,609
- Demonym: Zurmatai

Zurmat (Pashto: زرمت) is a district in the Paktia Province of Afghanistan. The main town is Zurmat, which is one of the main cities of the region of Loya Paktia.

== Geography ==
Zurmat borders Logar, Ghazni, and Paktika provinces. Tamir is the main bazaar of the district. Geographical features of Zurmat include the Shah-i-Kot Valley and the Arma Mountains. The district contains 63 or 64 schools. Zurmat does not receive power from the national electricity grid, so solar power and generators are prevalent.

== Demographics ==
The population of the district is 120,000 (CSO 2004). According to the same sources, Pashtuns make up 99% of the total population followed by 1% Tajiks. Many people of Zurmat work in Arab countries like the United Arab Emirates, Saudi Arabia, Qatar and Kuwait.

== History ==
Operation Anaconda, a major battle of the War in Afghanistan, took place in Zurmat in 2002. For the rest of the war, Zurmat has been a stronghold of the Taliban insurgency and the Haqqani network. In 2019, the Taliban controlled 80% of the district.
