= Tsamkani District =

District in Afghanistan

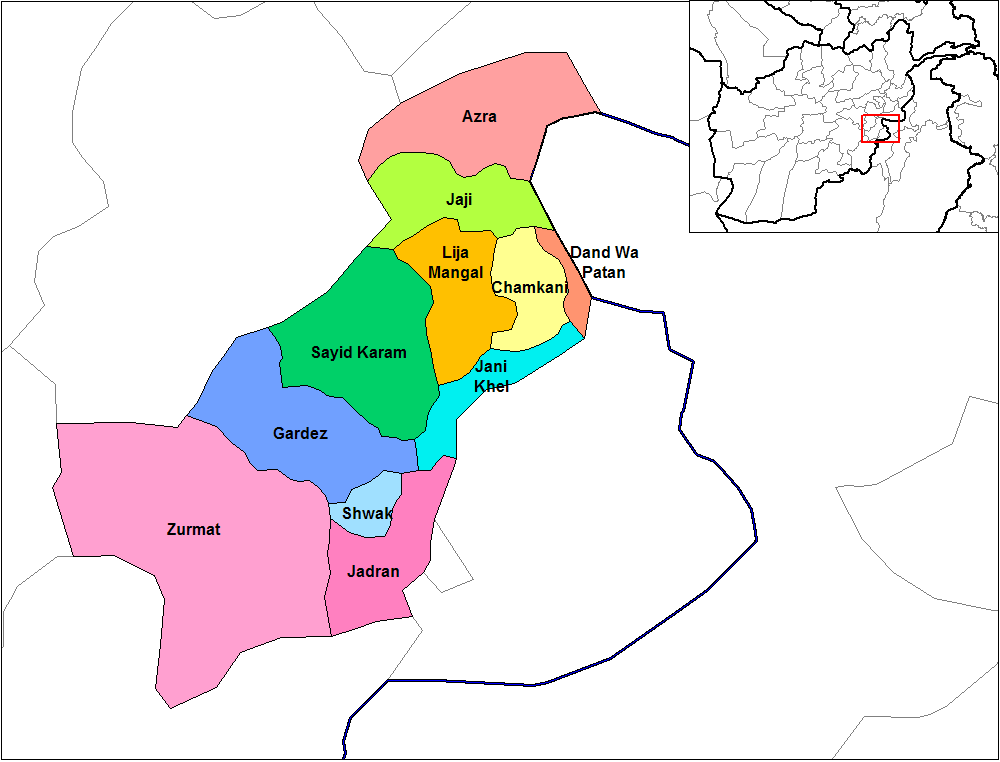
Districts of Paktia Province

Tsamkani (Pashto: څمکني ولسوالۍ), also Chamkani or Samkani, is a district in Paktia Province, Afghanistan. The main town is Tsamkani. The district is home to the Chamkani tribe of Pashtuns.

== History ==
On 16 May 2020, the Taliban abducted 12 civilians in Tsamkani District, charging them for "collaborating with the government".

== Demographics and population ==
Like in the rest of Afghanistan, no exact population numbers are available. The Afghan Ministry of Rural Rehabilitation & Development (MRRD) along with UNHCR and Central Statistics Office (CSO) of Afghanistan estimated the population of the district to be around 58,560 (CSO 2004). According to the same sources, Pashtuns make up 100% of the total population.
