= Nimat Allah al-Harawi =

Mughal-era chronicler who compiled a Persian-language history of the Pashtuns

Ni'mat Allah al-Harawi (also known as Niamatullah; fl. 1613 – c. 1630) was a chronicler at the court of the Mughal Emperor Jahangir where he compiled a Persian history of the Afghans, the Tarikh-i-Khan-Jahani. He was a waqia navis (news-writer) in the Mughal service, and belonged to an urban Iranian family hailing from Herat.

The original material for the book was provided by Haibat Khan of Samana, under whose patronage Nimatullah made the compilation c. 1612. The original material was later published separately as Tarikh-i-Khan Jahani Makhzan-i-Afghani. The first part of both books are the same, but the latter part contains an additional history of Jehan Lodi.

The material is part fictional, part historical. The book is a major source of tradition relating to the origins of the Pashtun. It also covers Pashtun rulers in Bengal, contemporary events, and Pashtun hagiography. Nimat Allah divided Afghans into three major lineages: Bettani, Sarbani and Gharghusht. He did not mention any tribe from the modern day's fourth confederacy of Pashtuns, the Karlani. It may be either because Karlani tribes were not Pashtunized yet or were not founded yet as a Pashtun confederation during the 17th century or he was not aware of them.

== English translations ==
A translation appeared in 1836 by Bernhard Dorn which had two parts. There is another partial translation from 1958, Nirodbhusan Roy titled, Niamatullah's History of the Afghans. A translation in two volumes by S. M. Imamuddin appeared in Dhaka, 1960–62.

== See also ==
- Assyrian captivity
- History of ancient Israel and Judah
