= Frontier Crimes Regulation =

Special set of laws in British India and Pakistan (1867–2018)

Frontier Crimes Regulation, 1901

Imperial Legislative Council
- Long title: A Regulation further to provide for the suppression of crime in certain frontier districts
- Citation: Regulation No. III of 1901
- Territorial extent: Federally Administered Tribal Area
- Enacted by: Imperial Legislative Council
- Repealed: 28 May 2018

Repeals
- FATA Interim Governance Regulation, 2018

Amended by
- The Frontier Crimes (Amendment) Regulation, 2011 (27 August 2011)

Related legislation
- Tribal Areas Rewaj Act, Twenty-fifth Amendment to the Constitution of Pakistan
- Status: Repealed

The Frontier Crimes Regulations (FCR) were a special set of laws of British India, and which were applicable to the Tribal Areas. They were enacted by the British Empire in the nineteenth century and remained in effect in Pakistan until 2018. They were extended to the Gilgit Agency in Jammu and Kashmir in 1901 and to Baltistan in 1947, remaining in effect till the 1970s.

The law stated that three basic rights did not apply to the residents of FATA: appeal; wakeel; daleel; (right to challenge a conviction; right to legal representation; right to present reasoned evidence, respectively).

Following the passing of the Twenty-Fifth Amendment to the Constitution of Pakistan by both houses of the Parliament, as well as the Khyber Pakhtunkhwa Assembly, the FCR was abolished and replaced with the FATA Interim Governance Regulation, 2018, merging the tribal areas with Khyber Pakhtunkhwa and placing FATA under direct provincial administration, removing its semi-autonomous status.

== History ==
The Murderous Outrages Regulation was enacted in British India (which included modern-day Pakistan) in 1867 to give the colonial government additional powers to prosecute serious crimes such as murder. It was re-enacted in 1873 with minor modifications, and again in 1877 as the "Ghazi Act" for its use in the Pashtun-inhabited frontier districts. The 1893 unilateral demarcation of the Durand Line by Mortimer Durand as the border between Afghanistan and British India, which divided Pashtun tribes across the border, caused further animosity among the Pashtun.

In 1901, the Frontier Crimes Regulations were enacted in British India. In 1947, the Pakistani government added the clause to the act that residents could be arrested without specifying the crime. The BBC notes that "political activists term the FCR a black law because the accused cannot get bail in such cases."

The FCR permits collective punishment of family or tribe members for crimes of individuals. It permits punishment to be meted out by unelected tribal jirgas and denies the accused the right to trial by judiciary. Tribal chiefs can also be held responsible for handing over suspects charged by the federal government without specifying an offence. Failure to comply can make the tribal chiefs liable for punishment. Human rights activists and the superior judiciary have argued that the regulation violates basic human rights.

The regulation denies those convicted of an offence by a tribal jirga the right to appeal their conviction in any court. It gives the federal government the right to seize private property in FATA and to convict an individual without due process. It lets the government restrict the entry of a FATA tribe member into a settled district in the rest of Pakistan. The discriminatory provisions of the regulation, both substantive as well as procedural - e.g. selection of jirga members (section 2), trial procedure in civil/criminal matters (sections 8 & 11), demolition of and restriction of construction of hamlet, village or tower in the North-West Frontier Province (section 31), method of arrest/ detention (section 38 & 39) security for good behaviour (sections 40, 42), imposition/collection of fine (sections 22-27), etc. are in violation of the Constitution of Pakistan. The FCR denies tribal residents: the right to be dealt with in accordance with the law; the security of person; safeguards to arrest and detention; protection against double jeopardy or self- incrimination; the inviolability of the dignity of man; prohibition of torture for the purpose of extracting evidence; protection of property rights; and the equality of citizens.

Other articles of the Constitution of Pakistan, such as Article 247, ensure that FATA residents cannot overturn the FCR.

== Status in Pakistan ==
In August 2011, President Asif Ali Zardari enacted a presidential order to amend the FCR. Widely viewed as the most substantive changes in the 110-year history of the regulation, the reforms included new time limits on the amount of time local administration officials can wait before informing that they have taken someone imprisoned. In addition, the 2011 amendments placed new restrictions on the collective responsibility clause in the regulation. Among others, changes included:

- Protection of women, children below 16 and all people above 65 from collective responsibility arrest
- Prohibition against arresting an entire tribe under collective responsibility
- Time limits for disposing of cases
- Provision for a more independent appeals process
- Appellate authority power to review decisions
- Strengthening of the FATA Tribunal
- Power to transfer cases from political agent to assistant political agent
- Concept of bail
- Jail inspections
- Voluntary reference to a council of elders and Qaumi Jirga (people's assembly)
- Inclusion of local customs and traditions (Rewaj)
- Fines on communities in case of murder
- Forfeiture of public salary for involvement in crime
- Arrest by authorities other than political agent
- Checks on arbitrary power to arrest
- Punishment and compensation for false prosecutions
- No deprivation of property rights without compensation
- Audit of political agent funds

If implemented in true letter and spirit of the law, these changes could have had a significant impact on the civil and human rights of citizens in Pakistan's tribal areas. However, the changes have been widely criticized and the political administration accused of lacking the will to implement and enforce the FCR as revised in 2011.

According to the FCR despite the presence of elected tribal representatives, the Parliament of Pakistan can play no role in the affairs of FATA.

Article 247 of the Pakistani Constitution provides that no Act of Parliament applies to FATA, unless the President of Pakistan consents. Only the President is authorized to amend laws and promulgate ordinances for the tribal areas. The elected representatives thus have no say in administration of FATA. It also repeals the jurisdiction of Pakistan's courts over FATA. By inference, this also limits the application of fundamental rights to FATA.

Article 247 and the Federal Crimes Regulation have been condemned by several jurists. Late Chief Justice of the Supreme Court, Justice Alvin Robert Cornelius, said that the FCR is "obnoxious to all recognised modern principles governing the dispensation of justice" in the case of Sumunder vs State (PLD 1954 FC 228).)

After taking a unanimous vote of confidence on 29 March 2008, then Prime Minister of Pakistan, Yousaf Raza Gilani, expressed his government's desire to repeal the FCR.

== FATA merger with KP ==
The National Assembly of Pakistan on Thursday, 24 May 2018, passed a constitutional amendment seeking the merger of the Federally Administered Tribal Areas (Fata) with Khyber Pakhtunkhwa (KP) with a 229-1 vote in favour.

This negates the effect of FCR in FATA, rendering it liable to laws and regulations passed by the KP assembly and operating under the constitution of Pakistan, after an at most two years interim period during which the federal government will manage the transition.

== See also ==
- Faqir of Ipi
- Murderous Outrages Regulation (1867, 1877, 1901)
- Shoukat Aziz
