= Chamkani (Pashtun tribe) =

څمکني (tsamkanī)

Regions with significant populations
- Tsamkani District, Paktia Province, Afghanistan; Peshawar district, Khyber Pakhtunkhwa, Pakistan

Languages
- Pashto

Religion
- Islam

Related ethnic groups
- Mohmand, Daudzai and Khalil Jalal khel

The Chamkani (Pashto: څمکني tsamkanī) is a sub-tribe of Ghoryakhel Pashtuns.

== History ==
They took part in the frontier battles 1897, and during the Tirah campaign of that year a brigade under General Gaselee was sent to punish them.

== Notables ==
- Shoukat Aziz, a Pakistani human rights activist who abolished the British Colonial era Frontier Crimes Regulation and co-founded the FATA Youth Organization
- Haji Mohammad Tsamkani, Acting President of Afghanistan (1986-1987)

== See also ==
- Shoukat Aziz
- Kurram District
