= Abdul Hamid Baba =

Pashtun poet (d. c. 1732)

Abdul Hameed Mashogagar
- Born: Mashogagar
- Died: Circa 1732; Mashogagar
- Resting place: Mashogagar
- Other name: Moshogagagar (wekhte seronky)
- Known for: Pashto poetry

Abdul Hameed Mashogagar (Pashto: عبدالحميد ماشو گگر; died c. 1732), also known as Abdul Hamid Baba, was a Pashtun poet and Sufi figure.

== Biography ==
Abdul Hameed baba Mashogagar was born in the second half of the 17th century (1664-1724 onward) at Mashogagar, a small village near Badaber Peshawar, a Pashtun tribe. Hameed travelled to Peshawar, where he undertook his education, and became a priest. At this point, Hameed was a man of considerable stature among intellectuals, and students from a number of surrounding districts came to receive instruction from him.

Hameed's poetry was written primarily in the Pashto language. His poems generally had a moral to them, and were often tinged with tones of contempt for the world and its lack of virtue. The morals of his poems were based on Sufism, as a large proportion of other Muslim poetry was.

Hameed's exact death date is not known, but it is thought by those in his home village that he died around the year 1732. He died in the same house that he had lived in for most of his life.

== Reception ==
Hameed's poetry was popular even in Persia, where he was dubbed "Hameed the Hair-splitter".

The 19th century British officer and linguist Henry George Raverty calls Hameed Afghanistan's cynical poet and compares him to Saadi (c. 1210) in Persia, "the Saadi of the Pascho language"

Hameed's major works, Love's Fascination, The King and the Beggar and Pearls and Corals have all been translated into English.
