= Qais Abdur Rashid =

Legendary founding father of the Pashtun people

- قیس عبدالرشید
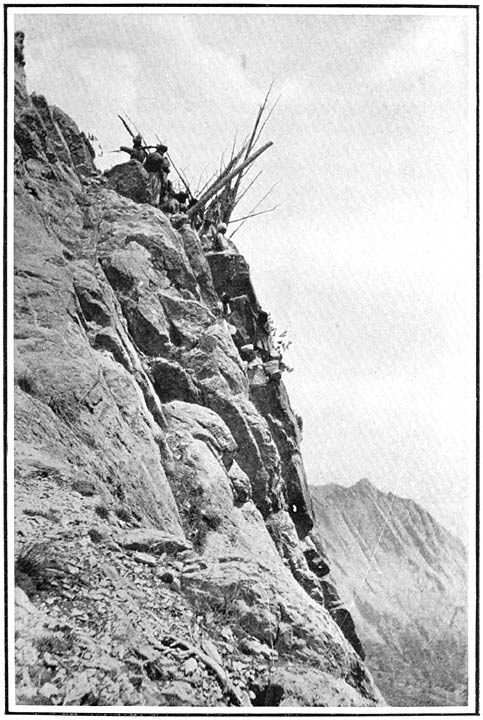
- Qais Abdur Rashid's shrine on the Takht-i-Suliman
- Born: 575; Ghor, Afghanistan
- Died: 661; Ghor, Afghanistan

Qais Abdur Rashīd or Qais Abdul Rasheed (Pashto: قيس عبد الرشيد) is said to be, in post-Islamic lore, the legendary founding father of the Pashtuns. It is believed that the conception of such a figure was promoted to bring harmony between religious and ethnic identities post-Arabic influence over the region. Qais Abdur Rashid is said to have traveled to Mecca and Medina in Arabia during the early days of Islam and converted. However, contrary to this legend, Islam spread through Afghanistan over a period of time.However, modern genome studies shows that this story is fully based on folk stories and has no genetics record.

== Genealogical tree ==
Some Afghan genealogists list Qais Abdur Rashid as the 37th descendant of the Benjamite king Talut (or Saul, reigned c. 1050 BC–1010 BC) through Malak Afghana, a legendary grandson of Talut.

According to the Encyclopaedia of Islam, the theory of Pashtun descent from the ancient Israelites is traced to Tārīkh-e Khān Jahānī wa Makhzan-e Afghānī (تاریخ خان جهانی ومخزن افغانی), a history compiled by Nimat Allah al-Harawi during the reign of the Mughal emperor Jahangir in the 17th century.

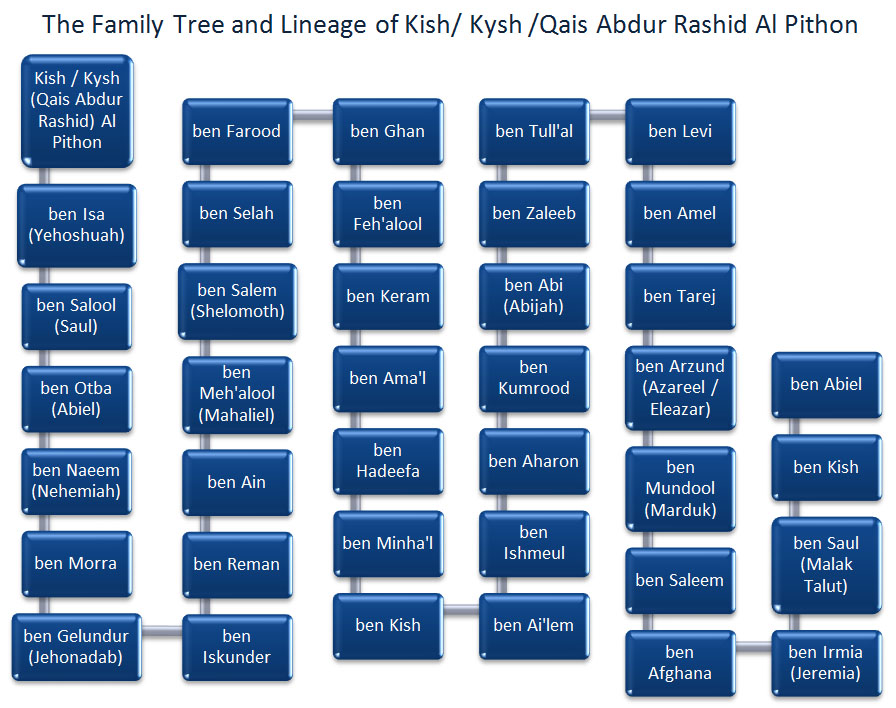
The family tree and lineage

== Legend ==
Legend has it that Qais was born in the Ghor region of present-day central Afghanistan. Upon hearing about the advent of Islam, his tribe sent him to Medina in the Arabian Peninsula, in present-day Saudi Arabia. He met Muhammad and embraced Islam there, and was given the name Abdur Rashīd by Muhammad. He then returned to Ghor and introduced Islam to his tribe. According to Mountstuart Elphinstone, in legend the famous military leader and companion of Muhammad, Khalid ibn al-Walid, introduced Qais to Muhammad.

The Afghan historians proceed to relate that the Jewish tribe, both in Ghor and in Arabia, preserved their knowledge of the unity of God and the purity of their religious belief, and that on the appearance of the Islamic prophet, Muhammad, the Afghans of Ghor listened to the invitation of their Arabian brethren, the chief of whom was Khalid ibn al-Waleed, so famous for his conquest of Syria, and marched to the aid of the true faith, under the command of Kyse, afterwards surnamed "Abdul Rasheed".

According to the folk tale, Qais had four sons: Saṛban (سړبن), Bēṭ (بېټ), and Gharghax̌t (غرغښت). His sons founded four big tribal confederacies named after them: Sarbani, Bettani, and Gharghashti. There are multiple versions of the legend, including several regional variants that mention only one, two, or three of the four legendary brothers.

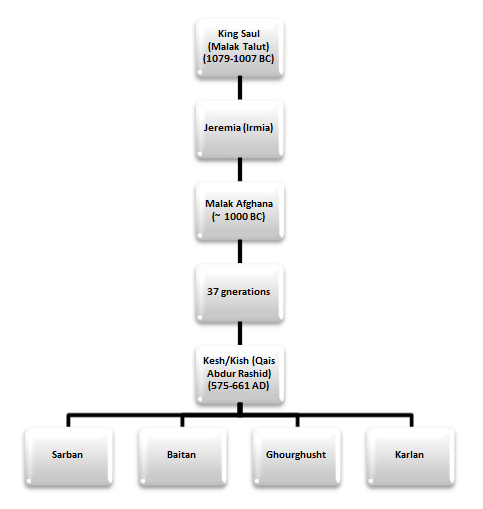

=== Settlement ===
One legend has it that when Qais felt his time was near, he asked his sons to take him from Ghor to the Sulaiman Mountains and bury him at the spot where his ancestor Malak Afghana was buried, and he was buried on top of Takht-e-Sulaiman ("Throne of Solomon"), also called Da Kasī Ghar (د کسي غر, "Mount of Qais"), located near the village of Darazinda in Frontier Region Dera Ismail Khan of the FATA Districts of Pakistan, close to Frontier Region Dera Ismail Khan's borders with both South Waziristan and Zhob District, Balochistan. Some people visit the place, mostly in the summer, since in winters the snowfall makes it difficult to climb, and sacrifice an animal, usually a sheep or a goat at the tomb of Qais.

According to another legend, however, Qais settled in the Balkh region of present-day northern Afghanistan. From there, his various descendants migrated south, west, and east.

== See also ==
- Imru' al-Qais, the pre-Islamic Arabic poet, whose life and legend might have influenced tales of Qais Abdur Rashid
- Amir Kror Suri, a legendary 8th-century Pashtun prince from Ghor
- Amir Suri, a pagan Ghorid king in the 9th and 10th century who was defeated in war with the Saffarid emir Ya'qub ibn al-Layth al-Saffar
- Lech, Czech, and Rus, three legendary brothers who are said to have founded the three modern Slavic nations of Poles (or Lechites), Czechs, and Rus' (or Russians, Ukrainians, and Belarusians)
- Fénius Farsaid, a legendary Scythian prince who is said to have founded the modern Irish nation and invented the Ogham Irish alphabet
- Asena, a she-wolf in the mythical foundation of the Göktürks
- Hayk, legendary father of the Armenians
