= PK-61 Mardan-VIII =

Pakistani electoral district

- Constituency for the Khyber Pakhtunkhwa Assembly
- Region: Takht Bhai Tehsil (partly) excluding Takht-i-Bahi Town in Mardan District

Current constituency
- Party: Pakistan Muslim League (N)
- Member(s): Jamshid Khan
- Created from: PK-27 Mardan-V (2002-2018); PK-55 Mardan-VIII (2018-2023)

PK-61 Mardan-VIII (پی کے-61 مردان-8) is a constituency for the Khyber Pakhtunkhwa Assembly of the Khyber Pakhtunkhwa province of Pakistan.

== See also ==
- PK-60 Mardan-VII
- PK-62 Charsadda-I
