= Supreme Court and High Court (Extension of Jurisdiction to Federally Administered Tribal Areas) Act, 2018 =

Law in Pakistan

The Supreme Court and High Court (Extension of Jurisdiction to Federally Administered Tribal Areas) Act, 2018 is an act of the Parliament of Pakistan extending the jurisdiction of the Supreme Court of Pakistan and the Peshawar High Court to the Federally Administered Tribal Areas. The act was assented to by the President of Pakistan on April 14, 2018.
