= Hazarbuz =

Nomadic Pashtun tribe

The Hazarbuz (Pashto: هزاربوز) meaning thousand goats are a nomadic Pashtun tribe.

== Occupation ==
Their key source of revenue has come from the import and sale of tea, and some other products particularly from Bukhara, in the northern regions of Afghanistan. They are famous for their trading and business.

They are non-Ghilzai Powandah Hazarbuz nomads which have historically travelled the routes between eastern Afghanistan, Pakistan and Turkestan for centuries, a region related to the Silk Road, an ancient route between the East and the West of Asia. Traditionally, Hazarbuz were involved in transport activities with their camels and are doing trade from centuries along with the pioneers Sulemankhel Ahmadzai and other Powandah nomadic merchant tribes.
