= Khalil (Pashtun tribe) =

Pashtun tribe

The Khalil (Pashto: خليل) The Khalil (Pashto: خليل) are a Pashtun Ghoryakhel subtribe primarily living in the Peshawar Valley of Khyber Pakhtunkhwa, Pakistan, with some members in Nangarhar, Herat, Ghazni, Khost, Paktia, and Kandahar in Afghanistan. The Khalils are settled in Peshawar, to the West are the Afridi tribe, North to the Daudzai, Momands are to the South, and Chamkani tribe is to the East. The Khalils also live on the southern side of Khyber-Pakhtunkhwa in Village Banda Daud Shah Banu District.

== Origins ==
Ghoryakhel had four sons Khalil, Daulatyar, Zeerani, Chamkani, tribes. The Khalil originally lived in Ghwara Marghay Arghistan Qandahar Afghanistan, in the Qalat Zabul and Ghazni. Khalil Mattezai still lives on the Tarnak River basin north of Ghazni. Sheikh Matte BaBa Shrine is close to Tarnak River on the Hill. Mongols invaded the region in 13th century, the Khalils, along with the Mohmands who were also Ghoryakhel son of Daulatyar, Daulatyar had two sons Mohmands and Daudzai, formerly settled in central Afghanistan, were driven out. The Khalil first migrated northeastwards to Kabul and then to Nangrahar further eastwards along the Kabul River. The Khalil came in 1530-1535 from Nangrahar to their present settlement in Western part of the Peshawar valley according to the Babur history book Baburnama and Pashto History Book Pata Khazana written by Abdulhai Habibi.
