= Shilmani =

Tribe in northern Pakistan

The Shilmani or Shalmani (Pashto: شلمانى) is a mostly Pashto-speaking Dardic tribe in northern Pakistan. It is believed to have originated from the Shalman Valley in Khyber District, Pakistan.
