= Dargai, Charsadda =

Union council in Khyber Pakhtunkhwa, Pakistan near to Manga

Dargai
- Union council
- Country: Pakistan
- Region: Khyber Pakhtunkhwa
- District: Charsadda District, Pakistan
- Time zone: UTC+5 (PST)

Dargai (in Urdu: درگئی) (in Pashto: درګئی) is a Union council in Charsadda District of Khyber-Pakhtunkhwa. Dargai is the last Union Council of Charsadda District on Mardan Road Near Manga. Which is located on Mardan Road at the distance of 16 kilometers from Charsadda city. Dargai is also Known as "Dargai Manga"
