= Pushkalavati Museum =

- Established: 2006
- Location: Charsadda District, Khyber Pakhtunkhwa, Pakistan
- Coordinates: 34.1811°N 71.7807°E
- Website: www.kparchaeology.com

Pushkalavati Museum also known as Charsadda Museum established in 2006, located in Charsadda, Khyber Pakhtunkhwa, Pakistan.

== History ==
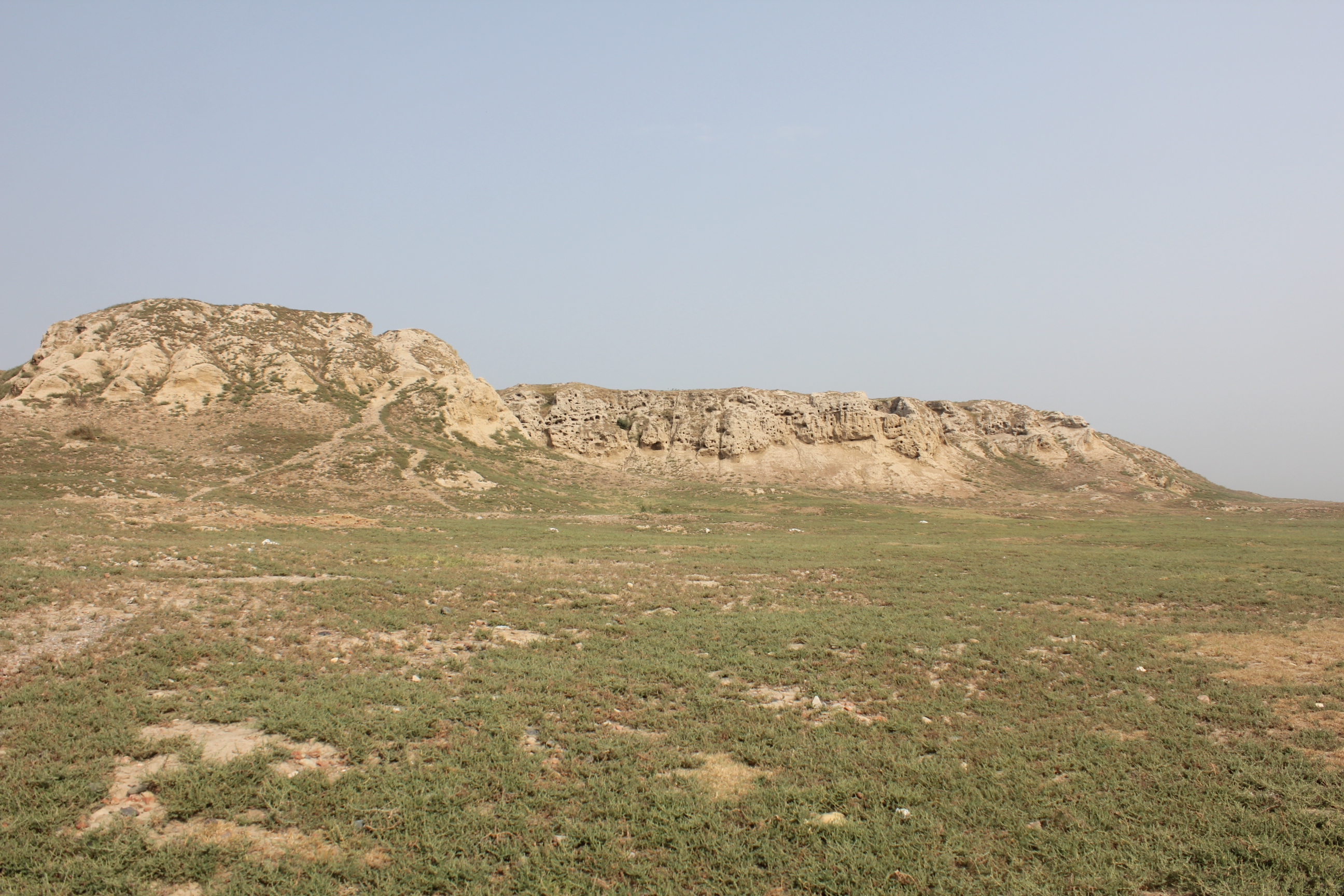
The remains of Pushkalavati's Bala Hisar

Pushkalavati was the first capital of Gandhara from 6th to 1st century BC and the former name of Charsadda District, which is situated 30 km to the northeast of Peshawar District. Remainder of Pushkalavati can be seen around the site of Balahisar. The city goddess was also called Pushkalwati. The term Pushkalavati (Sanskrit) is a combination of two Prakrit words Pushkara or Pushkala which mean lotus (a type of flower) and 'wati or vati', mean city so Pushkalavati mean that the Lotus City. The lotus flower, which also represented Buddha in primitive sect, is still grown in Charsadda area which is a very fertile and the city had around ponds full of lotus flowers. The Syama Jataka also took place. The legendary Hariti Devi and Panchika were born here and converted to Buddhism by Buddha.

In 1958 "S.M. Wheeler" exposed the remains of two cities at Bala Hisar and from 1962 to 1963 Dr. Ahmad Hasan Dani exposed the Sheikhan Dheri. These two sites are present opposite to each other and located on the banks of River Jindi (a feeder of River Swat).

=== Ghani Dheri (Charsadda) ===
Ghani Dheri is located about 4 km northeast of Charsadda Town. Ghani Dheri is named after the famous poet, artist, philosopher and legend of Pathan culture Khan Abdul Ghani Khan (better known Ghani Khan), the son of Bacha Khan (real name Abdul Ghafar Khan was a legendary freedom fighter and politician). Government of Khyber Pakhtunkhwa built a hall in 2001 consisting of a Mushaira Hall and a Library at the site to honour and in the memory of Khan Abdul Ghani Khan. The Mushaira Hall is decorated with the paintings and poetry of Khan Abdul Ghani Khan. The Library composed of two divisions one for the specialized books on Ghani Khan and other for the general books. And later the Pushkalavati Museums of Archaeology and Ethnology has been built in 2006.

== See also ==
- Mardan Museum
- List of museums in Pakistan
