= Constituency PK-22 (Charsadda-VI) =

- Former constituency for the Khyber Pakhtunkhwa Assembly

Former constituency
- Abolished: 2018

Constituency PK-22 (Charsadda-VI) was a constituency for the Khyber Pakhtunkhwa Assembly of the Khyber Pakhtunkhwa province of Pakistan.

== See also ==
- Constituency PK-17 (Charsadda-I)
- Constituency PK-18 (Charsadda-II)
- Constituency PK-19 (Charsadda-III)
- Constituency PK-20 (Charsadda-IV)
- Constituency PK-21 (Charsadda-V)
