= Ambhader =

- Village
- Location in Pakistan
- Coordinates: 34.142796°N 71.702702°E
- Country: Pakistan
- Province: Khyber Pakhtunkhwa
- District: Charsadda
- Tehsil: Charsadda Tehsil
- Time zone: UTC+5 (PST)
- Languages: Pashto (local); Urdu (national); English (official)

Ambhader is a village in Charsadda District of Khyber Pakhtunkhwa province in Pakistan. The village is situated along the Swat River, on the road that connects Sardaryab with Shabqadar and the district capital, Charsadda. Just 1 kilometre (0.62 mi) south of the village, the Swat River joins the Kabul River in Nowshehra.

== Geography and climate ==
The village of Ambhader sits on the Peshawar valley of the Iranian plateau, near the junction of the Hindu Kush mountains with the Eurasian Plate.

The village has a humid subtropical climate, with hot summers and relatively cold winters, and moderate rainfall.
