= Public Health Engineering Department (KPK) =

Provincial government department in Khyber Pakhtunkhwa, Pakistan

- پبلک ہیلتھ انجینئرنگ ڈیپارٹمنٹ

Provincial Department overview
- Formed: 2009; 17 years ago
- Status: Active
- Headquarters: Peshawar, Khyber Pakhtunkhwa, Pakistan
- Employees: 11,000
- Minister responsible: Fazle Shakoor Khan , Minister for Public Health Engineering
- Parent department: Government of Khyber Pakhtunkhwa
- Website: phedkp.gov.pk

The Public Health Engineering Department (PHED) is a department of the Government of Khyber Pakhtunkhwa province in Pakistan responsible for providing clean drinking water, sanitation services, and promoting hygiene to improve public health across the province.

The department plans, executes, and maintains various water supply and sanitation schemes throughout Khyber Pakhtunkhwa. Its core mission is to ensure access to safe drinking water and adequate sanitation facilities for rural populations.

As of 2025, Pakhtoon Yar Khan serves as the Minister for Public Health Engineering in Khyber Pakhtunkhwa.

== History ==
The department was established in 1974 and later upgraded to an administrative department in 1992. In 2001, it was merged into the Communication and Works Department. However, in November 2009, it became an independent department again.

== Functions ==
The department has been assigned different functions related to public welfare.

- Planning, execution and maintenance of drinking water supply and sanitation schemes in rural areas.
- Setting standards and specifications for various types of construction materials or equipment.
- Water quality monitoring, including maintenance of a water quality data base.
- Research and material testing pertaining to public health engineering sector projects.
- Determining water tariff and collection of water charges.
- Service related affairs, except those entrusted to the Establishment and Administration Department.
- Providing engineering training and short skill development courses.

== Organization ==
The department has four Chief Engineers (CE); 20 Superintending Engineers (SE)/Director Technical/Director Design(DD) and 52 Executive Engineers (XEN)/Deputy Director Technical (DDT)/Design Engineers (DE)/, 100 Sub-Divisional Officers (SDO)/Assistant Design Engineers (ADE), 206 Sub-Engineers (S/Es), 1426 Support Staff and 9292 Operational Staff.

== Committee on Public Health Engineering Department ==
Khalid Khan currently heads the 10-member KP assembly committee on the Public Health Engineering Department.

== See also ==
- Government of Khyber Pakhtunkhwa
- Water supply and sanitation in Pakistan
