= Pushkalavati =

Capital of ancient Gandhara in modern-day Pakistan

Pushkalāvatī
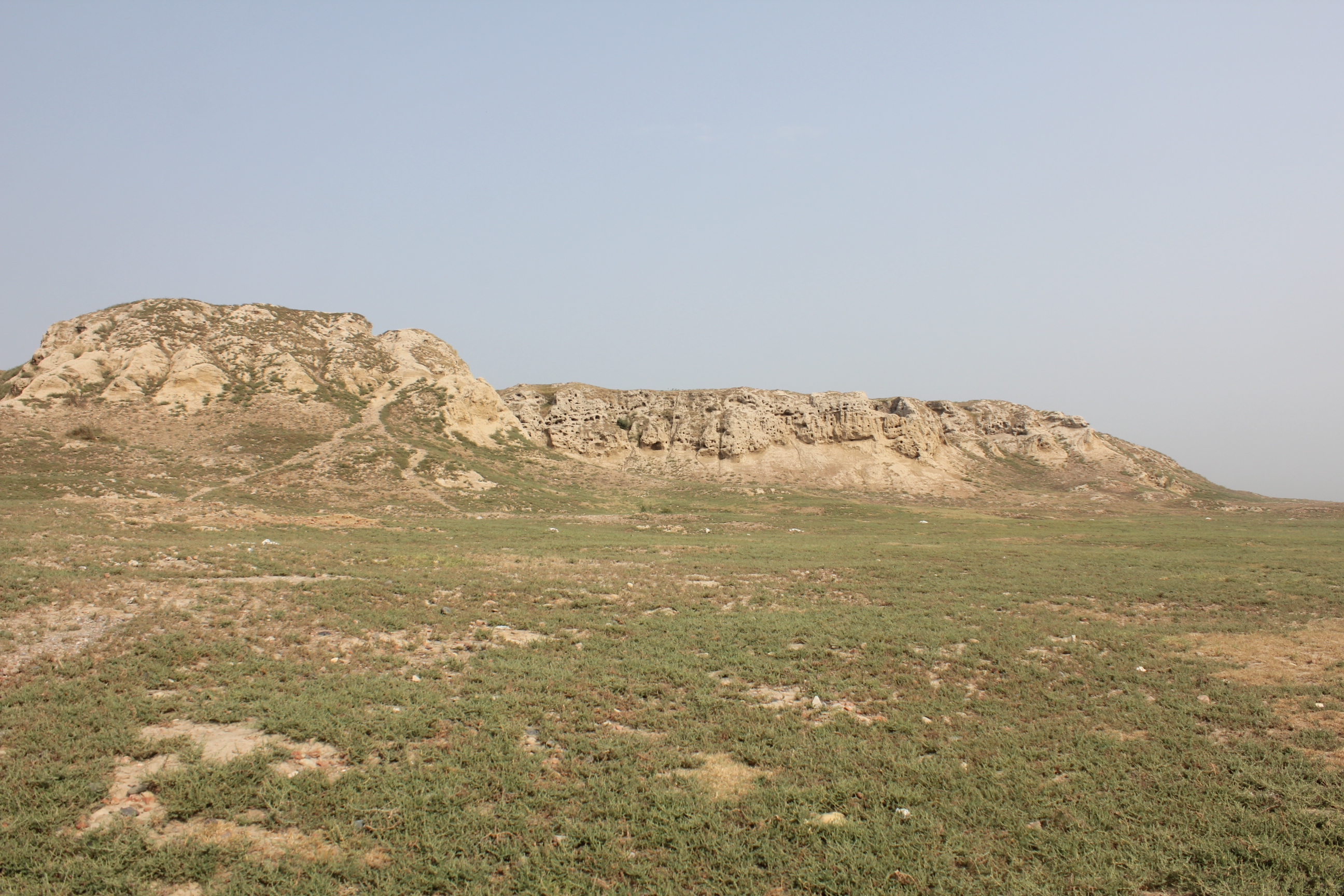
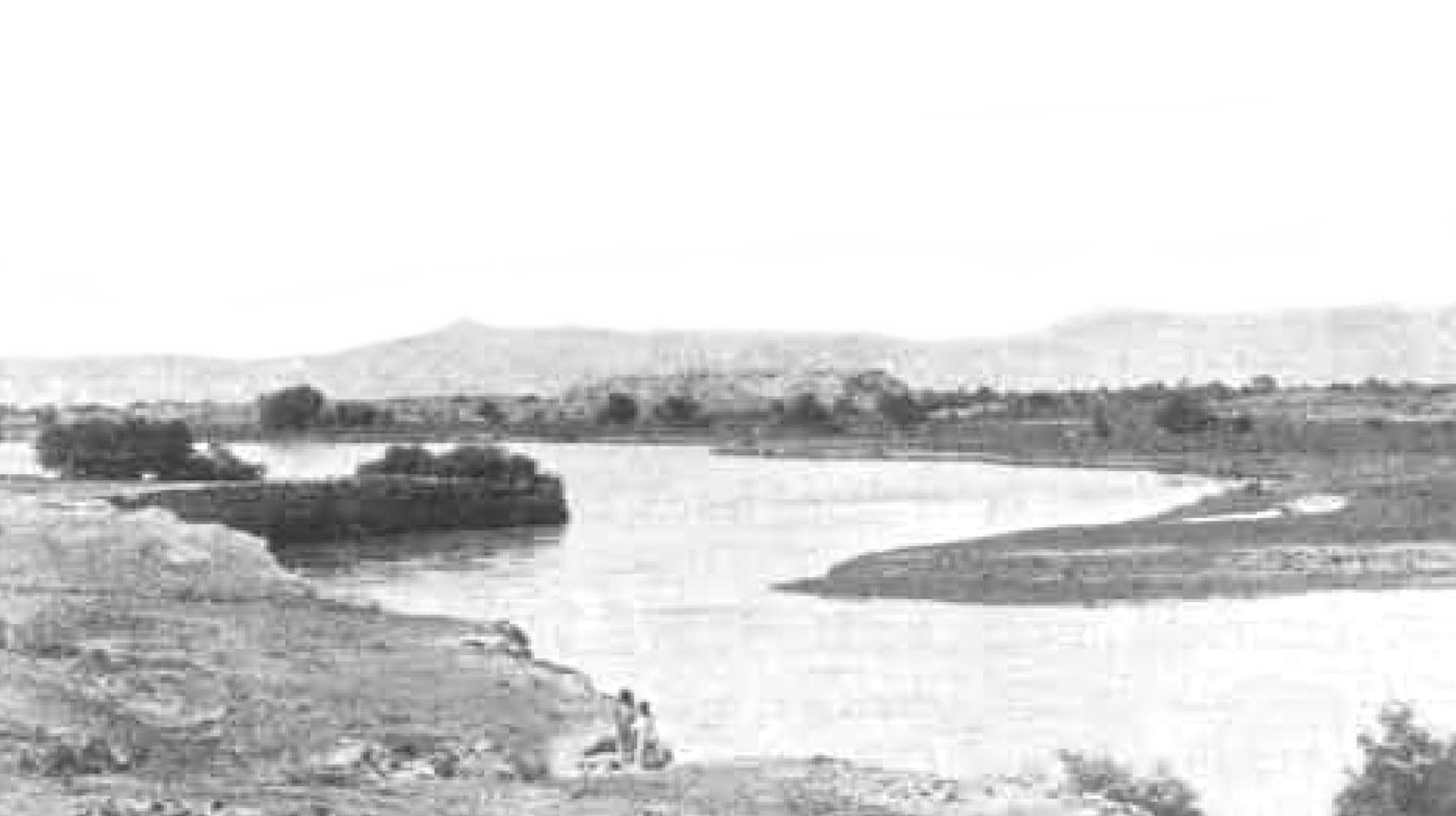
- Top : The remains of the original mound, Bala Hisar; Bottom: Swat river and Bala Hisar mound just beyond (center of the photograph).

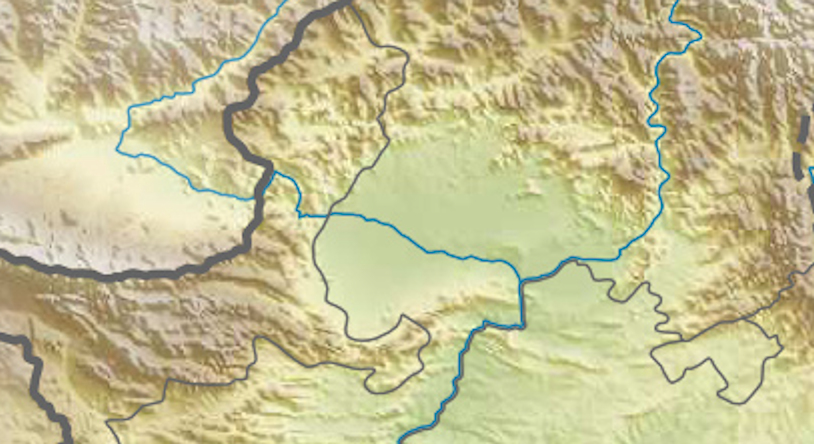
- Location within Pakistan Location within Gandhara Location within Khyber Pakhtunkhwa
- 34.168°N 71.736°E
- Type: Ancient city
- Periods: Gandhara
- Location: Outskirts of Charsadda, Khyber Pakhtunkhwa, Pakistan

History
- Built: c. 1400 BCE

Site notes
- Excavation dates: 1902
- Archaeologists: Sir John Marshall; Sir Mortimer Wheeler
- Management: "Pushkalavati: The Lotus City", Archaeological Guide Series No. 1, Peshawar Univ

Pushkalavati (Note: Pashto: پشکلاوتي; Urdu: پُشْكَلآوَتی; Sanskrit: पुष्कलावती, romanized: Puṣkalāvatī; Prakrit languages: Pukkalāoti; Ancient Greek: Πευκελαῶτις, romanized: Peukelaôtis) or Pushkaravati (Sanskrit: पुष्करावती, romanized: Puṣkarāvatī; Pāli: Pokkharavatī), in Bala Hisar, and later Shaikhan Dheri (Pashto: شېخان ډېرۍ; Urdu: شیخان ڈھیری) was the capital of the ancient region of Gandhāra in modern-day northwestern Pakistan. Its ruins are located on the outskirts of the modern city of Charsadda in Khyber Pakhtunkhwa, 35–42 kilometres northeast of Peshawar, at the banks of Jindi River, near the junction of Swat River with Kabul River. The earliest archaeological remains in Bala Hisar mound are from 1400 to 800 BCE. Pushkalavati (in Bala Hisar mound) may have been incorporated as an Achaemenid regional settlement around 520 BCE, and it remained an important city (in Shaikhan Dheri mound) through to the beginning of the 3rd century CE.

The ruins of Pushkalavati consist of two sites, separated by the small Shambor river. To the south is Bala Hisar, which consists of two separate mounds, one eastern and one western. To the north is Shaikhan Dheri, wedged between the Shambor and Jindi rivers.

== Etymology ==
Pushkalavati (IAST: Puṣkalāvatī) means "Lotus City" in Sanskrit. According to Hindu mythology as per the Ramayana, it was named Pushkalavati because it was given to Pushkala, the son of Bharata.

The region around ancient Pushkulavati was recorded in the Zoroastrian Zend Avesta as Vaēkərəta, or the seventh most beautiful place on earth created by Ahura Mazda. It was known as the "crown jewel" of Bactria, and held sway over nearby ancient Taxila.

== Ruins ==
The ruins of Pushkalavati consist of many stupas and the sites of two ancient cities.

=== Bala Hisar ===
Bala Hisar site (34.168°N 71.736°E) in this area was first inhabited in the 2nd-millennium BCE. The C14 dating of early deposits in Bala Hisar, bearing "Soapy red"/red burnished ware, is 1420-1160 BCE, so this early phase is considered to last roughly from 1400 to 800 BCE.

Along with the continuity of red burnished ware, but now decorated with grooves (the so-called "grooved" red burnished ware), in the period (c. 750-500 BCE) there was influence from Ganges Valley in the appearance of upright-sided open bowls made of grey ware, similar to Painted Grey Ware culture's pottery shapes.

The site could have been incorporated to Achaemenid empire c. 520 BCE, although there is no archaeological evidence of administrative buildings or palaces in Bala Hisar, but only "some evidence of the emulation of Achaemenid drinking vessels" which local elites could have adopted from the empire. Pottery known as "Tulip bowls," which attests to emulation of Achaemenid shapes, is only present in Bala Hisar in (c. 400-325 BCE).

According to Arrian, the city then surrendered in 327/326 BCE to Alexander the Great, who established a garrison in it. Reinhard Dittman (1984) suggested that the earliest appearance of the "Lotus bowl" in Bala Hisar belongs to the time of Alexander the Great up to the beginning of the Mauryan times, late 4th to early 3rd centuries BCE, but according to Cameron Petrie (2013), a post-Achaemenid date around the late 4th to the 2nd centuries BCE is likely.

=== Peucela in Shaikhan Dheri ===
The Bactrian Greeks built a new city (Peucela (Greek: Πευκέλα) or Peucelaōtis (Greek: Πευκελαώτις) at the mound currently known as Shaikhan Dheri (34.178°N 71.743°E), which lies one kilometre northeast from Bala Hissar on the other side of Shambor River, at the banks of River Jindi. This city was established in the second century BCE during the Indo-Greek period and inhabited until the beginning of the third century CE, occupied by Indo-Scythians, Indo-Parthians and Kushans.

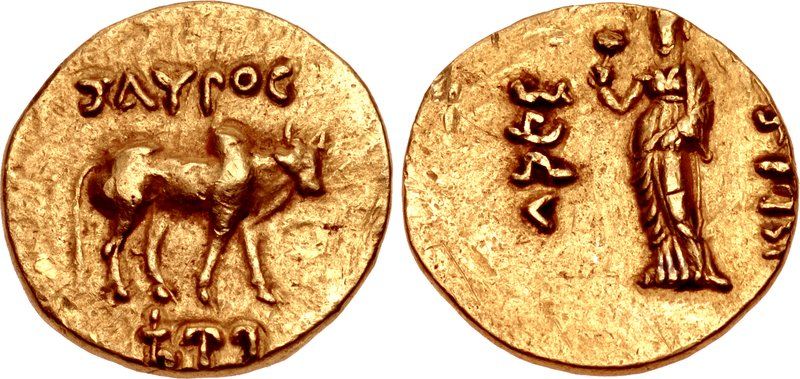
Pushkalavati mint. Obverse: Zebu with Greek ταυροϛ ('tauros' meaning 'bull) above, [u]ṣabhe (cf. Sanskrit vṛṣabha = bull) in Kharosthi at the bottom. Reverse: Tyche of Pushkalavati, wearing mural crown, holding a flower. [Po]khala[va]didevada (cf. Sanskrit 'Puṣkalāvatī devatā' i.e. 'the goddess of Puṣkalāvatī city') in Kharosthi up right, [droprasaya] in Kharosthi down left. Time of Azes I, circa 58-12 BCE.

Two early Buddhist manuscripts were acquired among a group of twenty‐seven birch‐bark scrolls, in 1994 by the British Library, possibly found in a Dharmaguptaka monastery in Hadda, Afghanistan. These two manuscripts, known as avadanas, and written in Gandhari language around the 1st century CE (now in the British Library Collection of Gandharan Scrolls) mention the name of the city as Pokhaladi.

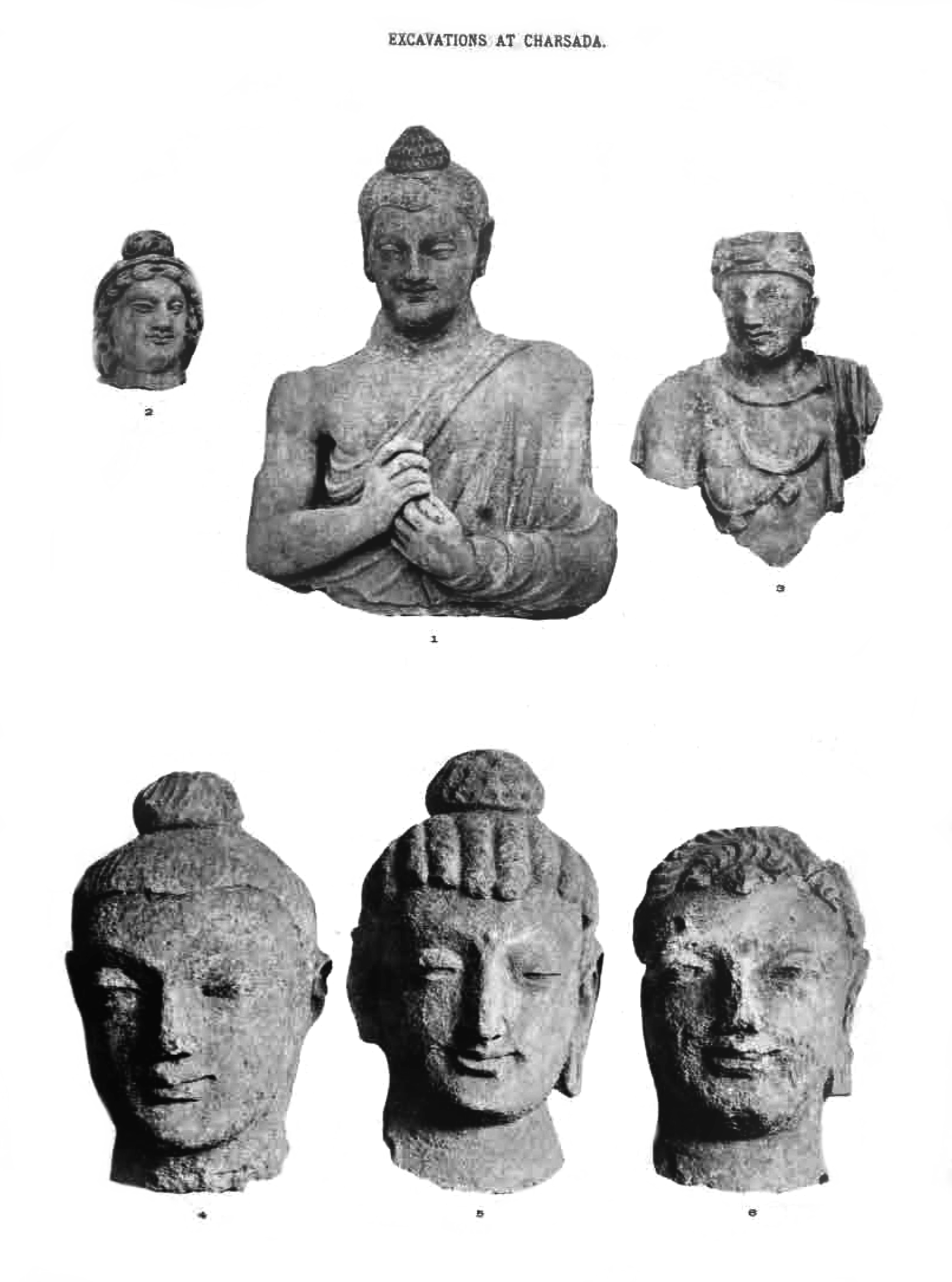
Buddhist statues (made of stucco), found around three kilometers to the east of Shaikhan Dheri, in mound Pālātu Dheri.

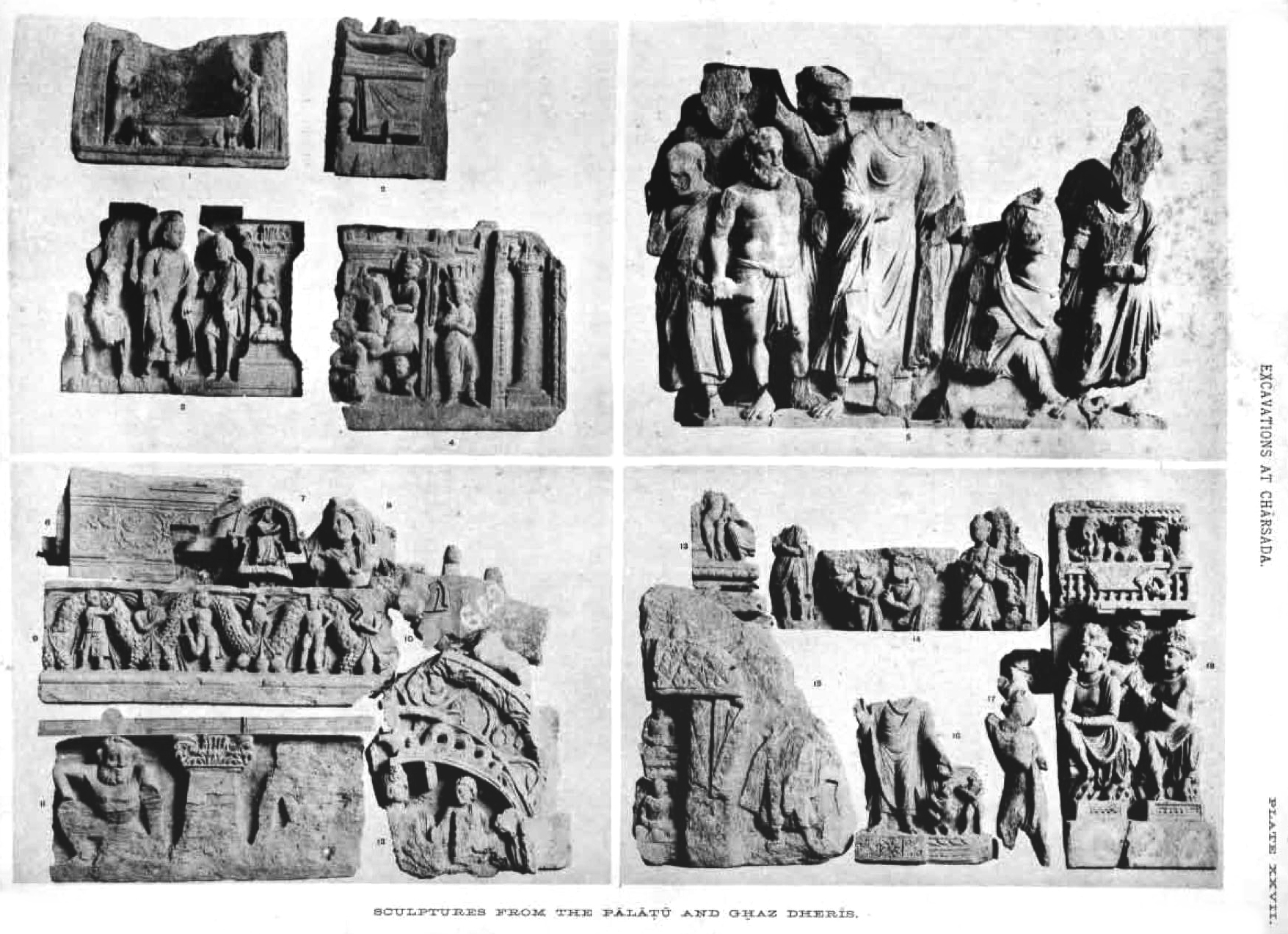
Buddhist statuary, found in Pālātu Dheri and Ghaz Dheri, roughly three kilometers to the east of Shaikhan Dheri.

In the 2nd century CE, river changed its course and city was flooded. The town moved to the site of the modern village of Rajjar. The former city's ruins were partly excavated by Ahmad Hasan Dani in the 1960s. There are still many mounds at Mir Ziarat, at Rajar and Shahr-i-Napursan which are still unexcavated.

The last reference to Pushkalavati as Po-shi-kie-lo-fa-ti was recorded in the account of the Chinese pilgrim Xuanzang in the 7th century C.E. The monk Hui Li also commented Xuanzang's visit to the east of the town Po-shih-kie-lo-fa-ti (Pushkalavati) where there was a stupa built by king Ashoka, in the location which four past Buddhas preached.

Subsequently, after the region was conquered by Mahmud of Ghazni in 1001 AD, the name Gandhara was not used anymore, and in all probability the following period is when Pushkalavati became known as Shaikhan Dheri, as dheri means mound/hill in Pashto.

== Pushkalavati and Prang ==
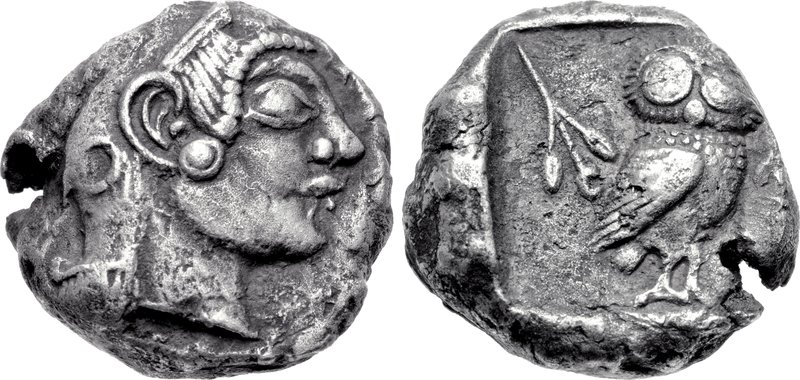
Athenian "Owls" coin (Circa 500/490–485 BCE) discovered in the Shaikhan Dehri hoard in Pushkalavati. This coin is the earliest known example of its type to be found so far east.

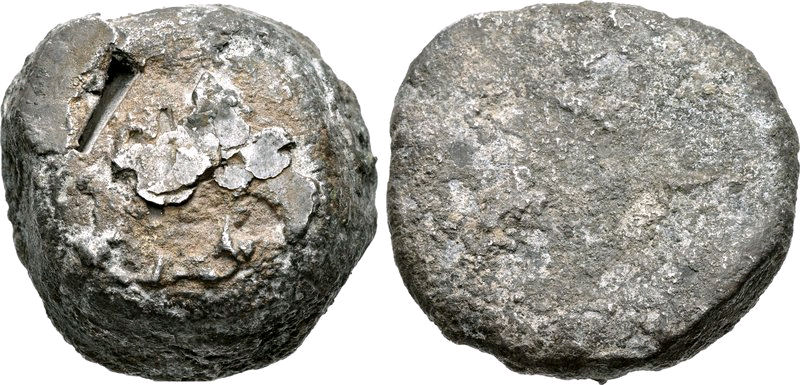
Achaemenid period silver ingot, circa 5th century BCE, Pushkalavati, Gandhara.

The city of Pushkalavati was situated near the confluence of Swat and Kabul rivers. Three different branches of Kabul river meet there. That specific place is still called Prang and considered sacred. A grand graveyard is situated to the north of Prang where the local people bring their dead for burial. This graveyard is considered to be among the largest graveyards in the world. The name Prang was considered by Ahmad Hasan Dani as ultimately derived from the word Prayag, meaning "confluence", via an intermediate contracted form *Prag. The name is a reference to the Kabul and Swat rivers, which must have once met here.

== Pushkalavati in the Ramayana ==
In the concluding portion of the (Ramayana) Uttarakanda or Supplemental Book, the descendants of Rama and his brothers are described as the receivers of the great cities and kingdoms which flourished in Western India. Uttarakānda may have been composed slightly later than c. 500 BCE.

According to this historical book, Bharata the brother of Rama had two sons, Taksha and Pushkala. Bharata gave to the former Taksha-sila or Taxila, to the east of the Indus, known to Alexander and the Greeks as Taxila. To the latter he gave Pushkala-vati or Pushkalavati, to the west of the Indus, known to Alexander and the Greeks as Peukelaotis. Thus according to Hindu legend, the sons of Bharata received kingdoms that flourished on either side of the Indus river, which were conquered by their father.

== See also ==
- History of Peshawar
- Pushkalavati Museum
