= Rashaki =

- Union council
- Country: Pakistan
- Region: Khyber Pakhtunkhwa
- District: Charsadda District, Pakistan
- Time zone: UTC+5 (PST)

Rashaki is a Union council in Charsadda District of Khyber-Pakhtunkhwa.
