= Sukkar =

Sukkar may refer to:

== Places ==
- Sukkur (disambiguation), Sindh, Pakistan
- Sukar, Charsadda District, Pakistan
- Qalat Sukkar, Dhi Qar Governorate, Iraq

== People ==
- Elias Sukkar (born 1991), a Lebanese rugby league footballer
- Josephine Sukkar, Australian business executive
- Maha Sukkar, an Australian police officer
- Malak Sukkar (1930-1992), a Syrian actress
- Michael Sukkar (born 1981), an Australian politician
- Tony Sukkar (skier) (born 1963), a Lebanese alpine skier
- Tony Sukkar (rugby league)
- Sukar Ravidas, Indian politician

== See also ==
- Succar, a surname
- Sukkar banat, Arabic title of the Lebanese film Caramel
- Sugar
