= Mohammad Arif =

Pakistani politician

Member of the Khyber Pakhtunkhwa Assembly
- In office 13 August 2018 – 18 January 2023
- Constituency: PK-60 (Charsadda-V)
- In office 31 May 2013 – 28 May 2018
- Constituency: PK-22 (Charsadda-VI)

Personal details
- Born: 16 November 1972 (age 53) Charsadda, Khyber Pakhtunkhwa, Pakistan
- Party: PTI (2013-present)
- Occupation: Politician

Mohammad Arif (born 16 November 1972) is a Pakistani politician from Charsadda who was a member of the Provincial Assembly of Khyber Pakhtunkhwa from May 2013 to May 2018 and from August 2018 to January 2023. He served as chair and as a member of different committees.

== Political career ==
Arif was elected as the member of the Khyber Pakhtunkhwa Assembly on ticket of Pakistan Tehreek-e-Insaf from PK-22 (Charsadda-VI) in the 2013 Pakistani general election.
