= Dosehra =

Coordinates: 34°8′37″N 71°54′22″E

- Town and union council
- Interactive map of Dosehra
- Country: Pakistan
- Province: Khyber Pakhtunkhwa
- District: Charsadda District
- Time zone: UTC+5 (PST)

Dosehra is a town and union council of Charsadda District in Khyber Pakhtunkhwa province of Pakistan..It is located at 34°8'37N 71°54'22E and has an altitude of 258 metres (938 feet).
