= Matta Magul Khel =

Coordinates: 34°6′50″N 71°28′36″E

Matta Mughal Khel
- Town and union council
- Interactive map of Matta Mughal Khel
- Country: Pakistan
- Province: Khyber-Pakhtunkhwa
- District: Charsadda District
- Time zone: UTC+5 (PST)

Matta Magul Khel is a town and union council in Charsadda District of Khyber-Pakhtunkhwa.
