= Sheikho =

Coordinates: 32°15′N 72°00′E

Sheikho شیخو
- Town and union council
- Interactive map of Sheikho
- Country: Pakistan
- Province: Khyber Pakhtunkhwa
- District: Charsadda District
- Time zone: UTC+5 (PST)

Sheikho is a town and union council of Charsadda District in Khyber Pakhtunkhwa province of Pakistan.
