= Mera Parang =

- Town and union council
- Country: Pakistan
- Province: Khyber Pakhtunkhwa
- District: Charsadda District
- Time zone: UTC+5 (PST)

Mera Parang is a town and union council of Charsadda District in Khyber Pakhtunkhwa province of Pakistan.
