= Matta Mughal Khel =

Coordinates: 34°16′45.71″N 71°34′3.5″E

- Town and union council
- Interactive map of Matta Mughal Khel
- Country: Pakistan
- Province: Khyber Pakhtunkhwa
- District: Charsadda District
- Tehsil: Shabqadar
- Union councils: Matta Mughal Khel

Government
  - Villages: Daman, Rustam khel, Palangzai, Hamza khel, etc.
  - MPA: Arif Ahmadzai
- Time zone: UTC+5 (PST)
- Postal code: Postal code
- Area code: 24640

Matta Mughal Khel is a town and union council of Charsadda District in Khyber Pakhtunkhwa province of Pakistan. It is located at 34°16'47N 71°33'59E and has an altitude of 343 metres (1128 feet).
