= Ikramullah Gran =

Pakistani author and poet

- Born: 15 January 1941; Charsadda, British India
- Died: 11 December 2014 (aged 73)
- Occupations: Ghazal writer Poet
- Children: 3

Ikramullah Gran Bacha (1941–2014), commonly known as Gran Baba, was a Pashto-language poet, ghazal writer and fiction writer from Pakistan. He died at the age of 73.

== Books ==
He wrote the following three books:

- Zama Ghazal (only book, published in the life of Ikram Ullah Gran)
- Jwand da khayal pa Aayeena ke (published after Gran's death)
- Spogmai (published after Gran's death)
