= Rajjar 2 =

- Union council
- Country: Pakistan
- Region: Khyber Pakhtunkhwa
- District: Charsadda District, Pakistan
- Time zone: UTC+5 (PST)

Rajjar 2 is a union council in Charsadda District of Khyber Pakhtunkhwa province, Pakistan.

== See also ==
- Rajjar 1
