= Sukkur (disambiguation) =

Sukkur is a city in Sindh, Pakistan.

Sukkur may also refer to:

== Places ==
- Sukkur Taluka, a tehsil of Sukkur district
- Sukkur District, a district of Sindh, Pakistan
- Sukkur Division, an administrative unit of Sindh, Pakistan
- Sukkur Barrage, a barrage in Pakistan

== Transportation ==
- Sukkur Express, a train of Pakistan railways
- Sukkur railway station, a railway station in Pakistan
- Sukkur rail disaster, an accident which occurred in 1990 near Sukkur, Sindh
- Sukkur Airport, an airport in Sindh, Pakistan

== Other uses ==
- Sukkur IBA University, a university in Sindh, Pakistan
- Sukkur cricket team, a local domestic cricket team

== See also ==
- Sukkar (disambiguation)
