= PK-65 Charsadda-IV =

Pakistani electoral district

- Constituency for the Khyber Pakhtunkhwa Assembly
- Region: Charsadda City area in Charsadda Tehsil and Shabqadar Tehsil (partly) of Charsadda District

Current constituency
- Party: Pakistan Tehreek-e-Insaf
- Member(s): Fazle Shakoor Khan
- Created from: PK-17 Charsadda-I (2002-2018); PK-59 Charsadda-IV (2018-2023)

PK-65 Charsadda-IV (پی کے-65 چارسدہ-4) is a constituency for the Khyber Pakhtunkhwa Assembly of the Khyber Pakhtunkhwa province of Pakistan.

== See also ==
- PK-64 Charsadda-III
- PK-66 Charsadda-V
