= Pakhtoon Yar Khan =

Pakistani politician

- پختون یار خان
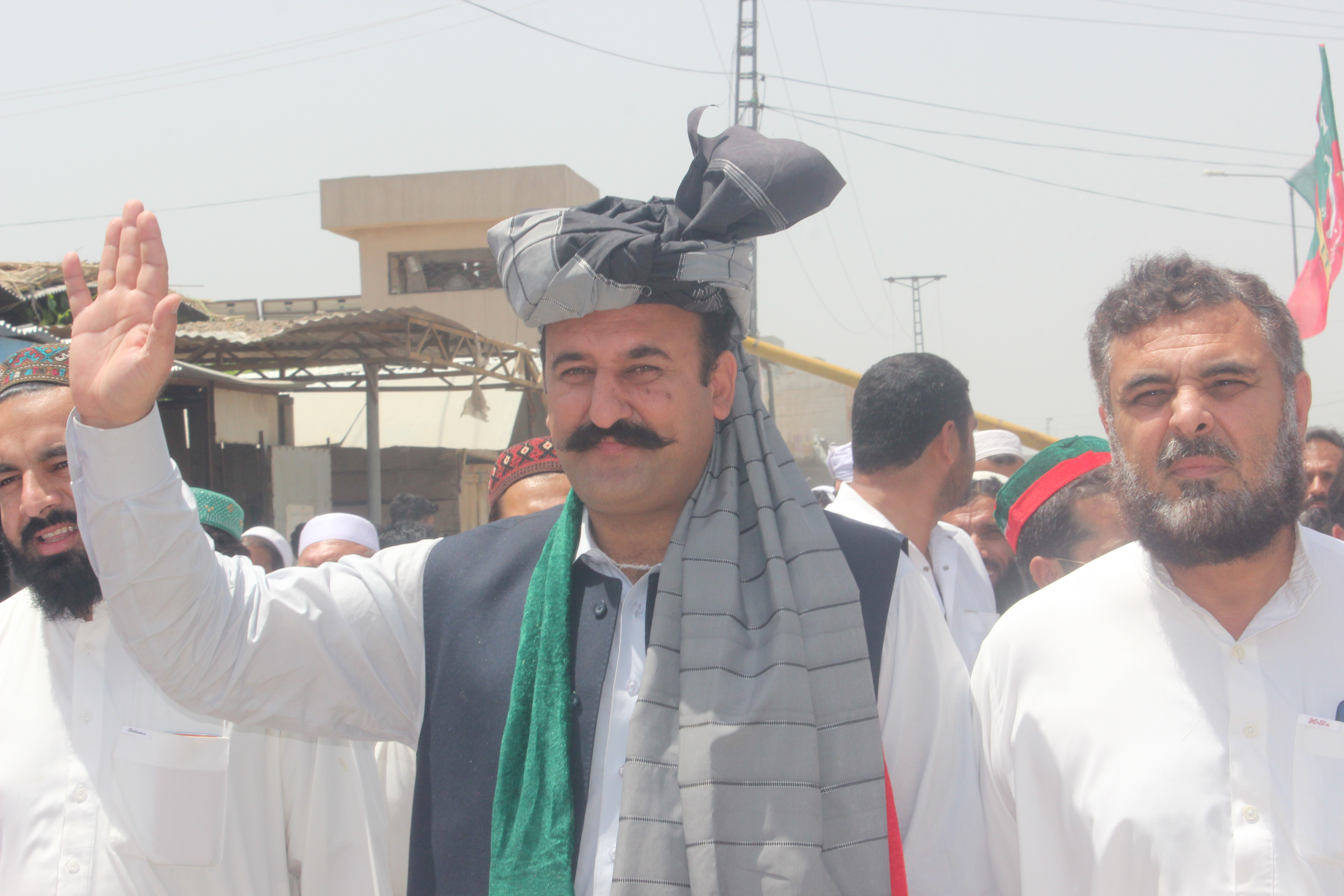

Provincial Minister of Public Health Engineering for Khyber Pakhtunkhwa
- In office 7 March 2024 – 13 October 2025
- Governor: Haji Ghulam Ali; Faisal Karim Kundi
- Chief Minister: Ali Amin Gandapur
- Succeeded by: Fazle Shakoor Khan

MeFazle Shakoor Khan mber of the Provincial Assembly of Khyber Pakhtunkhwa
- Incumbent
- Assumed office 29 February 2024
- Constituency: PK-100 (Bannu-II)
- In office 13 August 2018 – 18 January 2023
- Constituency: PK-88 (Bannu-II)

Personal details
- Party: PTI (2018-present)

Pakhtoon Yar Khan (Urdu: پختون یار خان) is a Pakistani politician from Bannu who served as Provincial Minister of Public Health Engineering for Khyber Pakhtunkhwa in the Gandapur ministry. He is a member of the Pakistan Tehreek-e-Insaf (PTI) and is a member of the Provincial Assembly of Khyber Pakhtunkhwa since 28 February 2024. Prior to this he was a member of the assembly from August 2018 to January 2023. His father, Attaullah Jan, was also a seasoned politician.

== Political career ==
He was elected to the Provincial Assembly of Khyber Pakhtunkhwa as a candidate of Pakistan Tehreek-e-Insaf from Constituency PK-88 (Bannu-II) in the 2018 Pakistani general election.

He was elected to the Provincial Assembly of Khyber Pakhtunkhwa as a Pakistan Tehreek-e-Insaf/Independent candidate from PK-100 (Bannu-II) in the 2024 Khyber Pakhtunkhwa provincial election. Following his election, he was inducted into the Gandapur ministry, the cabinet of Chief Minister Ali Amin Gandapur as Provincial Minister for Public Health Engineering on 7 March 2024.

According to a July 2024 report published by the Associated Press of Pakistan, Pakhtoon Yar Khan stated that the development projects approved by Chief Minister Ali Amin Gandapur would be completed soon. He also praised Gandapur for the ongoing development works and public issues in Khyber Pakhtunkhwa, particularly in the Bannu Division.

Chief Minister Ali Amin Gandapur stated that Pakhtoon Yar Khan was the sixth-best performing minister in his cabinet.
