= Succar =

Succar is a common surname. Notable people with the surname include:

Middle name

- Jean Succar Kuri (born 1944), Lebanese-born Mexican convicted businessman

Surname / Family name

- Alexander Succar (born 1995), Peruvian football (soccer) player
- Tony Succar (born 1986), Peruvian–American musician, composer, arranger and producer

== See also ==
- Sukkar (disambiguation)
