= Mardan Museum =

Museum in Pakistan

- د مردان موزه
- Established: 1991
- Location: Mardan District, Khyber Pakhtunkhwa, Pakistan
- Coordinates: 34.19688°N 72.0159°E
- Owner: Government of Khyber Pakhtunkhwa
- Website: www.kparchaeology.com

Mardan Museum is located in the Mardan District, Khyber Pakhtunkhwa, Pakistan. The museum was first established in 1991 in a Town Hall with a single hall with 22 show cases displaying more than 90 Gandhara's sculptures by the supervision of Sahibzada Riaz Noor (then Commissioner of Mardan Division). Later in 2006 a portion of land provided by the Mardan District Government on the request of Provincial Government and build three Galleries which was inaugurated by a former Chief Minister of Khyber Pakhtunkhwa Ameer Haider Khan Hoti in 2009.

== Gandhara Gallery ==
The Gandhara Gallery consist of Gandharan sculptures. Most of these sculptures came from the sites of Takht-i-Bahi, Jamal Garhi and Seri Bahlol. These are the Previous birth (Jataka tales) of Buddha, life scenes of Buddha, Palace scenes, Individual images of Buddha and Bodhisattva, Bejeweled heads of Bodhisattva, stucco heads of Buddha and Architectural elements.

== Ethnological Gallery ==
The profile of the ethnic region represented by Ethnological Gallery. The gallery include the household objects, traditional jewelry, weapons, wooden and leather stools and boxes embroidery works, musical instruments and many others.

== Islamic Gallery ==
The manuscripts of 8th to 13th century Hijri exhibited in the Islamic Gallery. The gallery include the beautiful calligraphic specimens of Quran, poetry and religious texts written mostly in the Arabic language and Persian where the dominant calligraphic styles are Naskh (script) and Nastaʿlīq script.

== Takht-i-Bahi ==
Takht-i-Bahi site is located in the Mardan District. This is one of the most well-known, preserved and monastic complex, and the Gandhara site that is on the World Heritage List. The complex consists of the main stupa (having a typical Gandharan style an elongated dome with square plinth and surrounded on three sides by chapels), monastery complex (having a central water tank, surrounded by small rooms on all sides), votive stupas, and the lower cells (used by the monks for the meditation purposes). This site was first reported by a French officer in the court (General Court) of Ranjit Singh in 1836. The Gandhara pieces recovered from Takht-i-Bahi and Seri Bahlol Most of them were placed in the Peshawar Museum.

== See also ==
- Pushkalavati Museum
- List of museums in Pakistan
