= Kangra, Charsadda =

Coordinates: 34°11′57″N 71°36′7″E

Kangra, Khyber-Pakhtunkhwa
- Town and union council
- Interactive map of Kangra, Khyber-Pakhtunkhwa
- Country: Pakistan
- Province: Khyber Pakhtunkhwa
- District: Charsadda District
- Time zone: UTC+5 (PST)

Kangra is a town and union council of Charsadda District in Khyber Pakhtunkhwa province of Pakistan. It is located at 34°11'57N 71°36'7E and has an altitude of 288 metres (948 feet).
