= Sukar =

Village in Charsadda District, Pakistan

Coordinates: 34°12′N 71°39′E

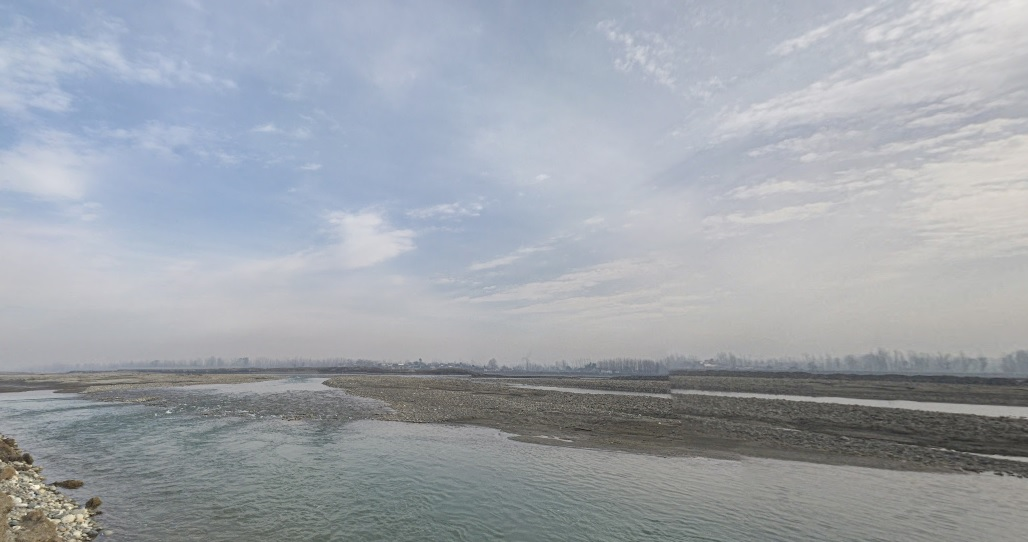
Sukkar, Khyber Pakhtunkhwa, Pakistan

Sukkar or سكڑ or سکړ is a village in Charsadda District of Khyber Pakhtunkhwa province, Pakistan. It is situated 9 km away from Sardaryab on Shabqadar road, about 9.5 kilometres (5.9 mi) from Sardaryab.
