= Fazle Shakoor Khan =

Pakistani politician

Provincial Minister of Public Health Engineering for Khyber Pakhtunkhwa
- Incumbent
- Assumed office 31 October 2025
- Governor: Faisal Karim Kundi
- Chief Minister: Sohail Afridi
- Preceded by: Pakhtoon Yar Khan

Member of the Provincial Assembly of Khyber Pakhtunkhwa
- Incumbent
- Assumed office 29 February 2024
- Constituency: PK-65 Charsadda-IV
- In office 13 August 2018 – 18 January 2023
- Constituency: PK-59 Charsadda-IV
- In office 2008–2023

Personal details
- Born: 1 February 1976 (age 50) Charsadda, Khyber Pakhtunkhwa, Pakistan
- Party: PTI (2018-present)
- Other political affiliations: JUI (F) (2013-2018); ANP (2008-2013)
- Occupation: Politician

Fazle Shakoor Khan is a Pakistani politician hailing from Charsadda who has been a member of the Khyber Pakhtunkhwa Assembly from August 2018 till January 2023. He belongs to the Pakistan Tehreek-e-Insaf. He is also serving as member the different committees. He was appointed as Minister for Law and Parliamentary Affairs and Human Rights by Chief Minister Mahmood Khan on 20 May 2021.

He was abducted 21-September-2026 from Peshawar by unknown gun men on a busy road.

== Political career ==
Khan was elected as the member of the Khyber Pakhtunkhwa Assembly on ticket of Jamiat Ulema-e-Islam (F) from PK-17 Charsadda-I in the 2013 Pakistani general election. He is also served as member of the Khyber Pakhtunkhwa Assembly from 2008 to 2013 in the 2008 Pakistani general election on the ticket of Awami National Party. Khan was elected as the member of the Khyber Pakhtunkhwa Assembly on ticket of Pakistan Tehreek Insaf from PK-59 Charsadda-I in the 2018 Pakistani general election
