= Sultan Mohammad Khan (politician) =

Pakistani lawyer and politician

Sultan Muhammad Khan

Provincial Minister of Khyber Pakhtunkhwa for Law, Parliamentary Affairs and Human Rights
- In office 29 August 2018 – 9 February 2021

Member of the Provincial Assembly of Khyber Pakhtunkhwa
- In office 13 August 2018 – 18 January 2023
- Constituency: PK-58 (Charsadda-III)
- In office 29 May 2013 – 28 May 2018
- Constituency: PK-18 (Charsadda-II)

Personal details
- Party: Awami National Party (2022-present)
- Other political affiliations: PTI (2017-2022); QWP (2010-2017); IND (2007-2010)

Sultan Muhammad Khan is a Pakistani lawyer and politician who served as the Provincial Minister of Khyber Pakhtunkhwa for Law, Parliamentary Affairs and Human Rights, in office from 29 August 2018 to 9 Feb 2021. He resigned from his post willingly to face an inquiry into unfounded and unproved allegations from which he was later cleared by his party. However, despite later requests by the then Chief Minister who visited his residence in Rajjar, Charsadda to invite him to rejoin the cabinet, he refused. Later a jirga led by ANP leader Aimal Wali Khan visited his residence to invite him to join ANP and subsequently he joined the ANP to which he is still affiliated. He had been a Member of the Provincial Assembly of Khyber Pakhtunkhwa from August 2018 till January 2023. Previously, he was a member of the Provincial Assembly of Khyber Pakhtunkhwa from May 2013 to May 2018. As a lawyer he has previously worked for law firms namely “Afridi, Shah & Minallah” and “Orr, Dignam & Co.” Presently he practices law at Peshawar and Islamabad.

== Early life and education ==
Sultan Muhammad Khan was born on 4 July 1980, in Charsadda, Pakistan. His father Asif Jan Khan is the present hereditary “Chief of Rajjar” continuing the history of the family as “Chiefs” of their tribe. His maternal grandfather Abdul Khaliq Khan (late) from Hoti, Mardan was a twice elected MNA in 1970 and 1988 and Senator from 1990 until his death in 1992. Sultan Muhammad Khan has a degree in Bachelor of Laws, from the University of Peshawar. He also obtained a degree in Master of Laws from King’s College, London in 2005.

== Political career ==
He ran for an election for a seat of the Provincial Assembly of the North-West Frontier Province as an independent candidate from Constituency PF-18 (Charsadda-II) in the 2008 Pakistani general election, but was unsuccessful. He lost the seat to a candidate of Awami National Party (ANP).

He was elected to the Provincial Assembly of Khyber Pakhtunkhwa as a candidate of Qaumi Watan Party (QWP) from Constituency PK-18 (Charsadda-II) in the 2013 Pakistani general election. He received 13,911 votes and defeated a candidate of Awami National Party.

In 2017, he quit QWP and joined Pakistan Tehreek-e-Insaf (PTI).

He was re-elected to the Provincial Assembly of Khyber Pakhtunkhwa as a candidate of PTI from Constituency PK-58 (Charsadda-III) in the 2018 Pakistani general election defeating a candidate of the Awami National Party.

On 29 August 2018, he was inducted into the provincial Khyber Pakhtunkhwa cabinet of Chief Minister Mahmood Khan and was appointed as Provincial Minister of Khyber Pakhtunkhwa for Law, Parliamentary Affairs and Human Rights.
