= PK-100 Bannu-II =

Pakistani electoral district

- Constituency for the Khyber Pakhtunkhwa Assembly
- Region: Kakki Tehsil, Ghoriwala and Bannu Tehsil (partly) of Bannu District

Current constituency
- Party: Vacant
- Member: Pakhtoon Yar Khan
- Created from: PK-73 Bannu-IV (before 2018) PK-88 Bannu-II (2018-2022)

PK-100 Bannu-II (پی کے-100 بنوں-2) is a constituency for the Khyber Pakhtunkhwa Assembly of the Khyber Pakhtunkhwa province of Pakistan.

== See also ==
- PK-99 Bannu-I
- PK-101 Bannu-III
