= PK-66 Charsadda-V =

Pakistani electoral district

- Constituency for the Khyber Pakhtunkhwa Assembly
- Region: Shabqadar city area in Shabqadar Tehsil of Charsadda District

Current constituency
- Party: Pakistan Tehreek-e-Insaf
- Member(s): Mohammad Arif
- Created from: PK-21 Charsadda-V & PK-22 Charsadda-VI (2002-2018); PK-60 Charsadda-V (2018-2023)

PK-66 Charsadda-V (پی کے-66 چارسدہ-5) is a constituency for the Khyber Pakhtunkhwa Assembly of the Khyber Pakhtunkhwa province of Pakistan.

== See also ==
- PK-65 Charsadda-IV
- PK-67 Mohmand-I
