= PK-62 Charsadda-I =

Pakistani electoral district

- Constituency for the Khyber Pakhtunkhwa Assembly
- Region: Tangi Tehsil (partly) including Tangi town of Charsadda District

Current constituency
- Party: Pakistan Tehreek-e-Insaf
- Member(s): Khalid Khan
- Created from: PK-20 Charsadda-IV (2002–2018); PK-56 Charsadda-I (2018–2023)

PK-62 Charsadda-I (پی کے-62 چارسدہ-1) is a constituency for the Khyber Pakhtunkhwa Assembly of the Khyber Pakhtunkhwa province of Pakistan.

== See also ==
- PK-61 Mardan-VIII
- PK-63 Charsadda-II
