= Rajjar 1 =

Coordinates: 34°10′13″N 71°45′18″E

- Town and union council
- Interactive map of Rajjar 1
- Country: Pakistan
- Province: Khyber-Pakhtunkhwa
- District: Charsadda District
- Time zone: UTC+5 (PST)

Rajjar 1 is a town and union council in Charsadda District of Khyber Pakhtunkhwa province, Pakistan. It is located at 34°10'13N 71°45'18E and has an altitude of 285 metres (938 feet).

== See also ==
- Rajjar 2
