= Khalid Khan (politician) =

Pakistani politician

Khalid Khan MPA

Member of the Khyber Pakhtunkhwa Assembly
- In office 13 August 2018 – 18 January 2023
- Constituency: PK-56 (Charsadda-I)
- In office 31 May 2013 – 28 May 2018
- Constituency: PK-20 (Charsadda-IV)

Personal details
- Party: PTI (2018-present)
- Other political affiliations: Qaumi Watan Party (2013-2018)
- Occupation: Politician

Khalid Khan a Pakistani politician hailing from Charsadda District, belonging to Pakistan Tehreek-e-Insaf, he did LLB from Peshawar University. Khan served as a member of the Provincial Assembly of Khyber Pakhtunkhwa from May 2013 to May 2018 and from August 2018 to January 2023. He also served as a member of different committees.

== Political career ==
Khan was elected as the member of the Khyber Pakhtunkhwa Assembly on ticket of Qaumi Watan Party from PK-20 (Charsadda-IV) in the 2013 Pakistani general election.

On 21 May 2018, he quits QWP and joined Pakistan Tehreek-e-Insaf and was re-elected to the KPK assembly on the ticket of Pakistan Tehreek-e-Insaf in the 2018 General Elections.
