= Manga, Mardan =

Manga Mardan منګاه
- Village and Union council
- Manga منګاه
- Country: Pakistan
- Region: Khyber Pakhtunkhwa
- District: Mardan District
- Time zone: UTC+5 (PST)
- Postal code: 23200

Manga is a union council in Mardan District of Khyber Pakhtunkhwa province, Pakistan. It is located on Charsadda Road, about 13 kilometres from Mardan city.

Contrary to the common belief that the word Manga means "Aman Gah" (home of peace), local accounts suggest that the village was named after a Hindu person named Manga who once lived in the area. Over time, the settlement came to be known by his name.

The union council of Manga comprises several sub-villages, including:

- Manga Baraz
- Muslim Abad
- Hasan Kali
- Dhery Kali
- Haspatal Kali (Amin Abad)

The union council of Manga also became nationally notable during the early stages of the COVID-19 pandemic, as Saadat Khan, a resident of Manga who had returned from Saudi Arabia, was the first fatality of COVID-19 in Pakistan. His death triggered a local lockdown in the Manga area.
