= PK-64 Charsadda-III =

Pakistani electoral district

- Constituency for the Khyber Pakhtunkhwa Assembly
- Region: Charsadda Tehsil (partly) of Charsadda District

Current constituency
- Party: Pakistan Tehreek-e-Insaf
- Member(s): Sultan Mohammad Khan
- Created from: PK-18 Charsadda-II (2002-2018); PK-58 Charsadda-III (2018-2023)

PK-64 Charsadda-III (پی کے-64 چارسدہ-3) is a constituency for the Khyber Pakhtunkhwa Assembly of the Khyber Pakhtunkhwa province of Pakistan.

== See also ==
- PK-63 Charsadda-II
- PK-65 Charsadda-IV
