= Sardaryab =

Pakistani tourist spot

Coordinates: 34.1317°N 71.6881°E

Sardaryab (Pashto: سردریاب) is a popular tourist and picnic destination located near Peshawar in Khyber Pakhtunkhwa, Pakistan. Situated along the banks of the Kabul River in Charsadda District, it lies about 20 kilometres (12 mi) northeast of Peshawar.

The site, known for its fresh fish, attracts visitors for both dining and boat rides on the river, with the number of visitors rising during holidays and festivals.
