= River Jindi =

River in Pakistan

Coordinates: 34.19097°N 71.74807°E

The River Jindi, also known as Kot and Manzari Baba, begins in the hills of Malakand Agency, in the northern district of Charsadda, in Khyber-Pakhtunkhwa, Pakistan. During the early months of each year, the River Jindi has a very limited water supply, but the summer months bring with them much needed rain to water the area. As the river proceeds downstream, the local people use dams, similar to the Warsak Dam on the Kabul River, to take out water for irrigation; therefore, the amount of water flowing downstream decreases. The area surrounding the Kabul and Jindi rivers is one of the largest irrigated areas within Khyber-Pakhtunkhwa. This coupled with an exponentially growing population alludes to problems in the future. The River Jindi used to have enough water to sustain the surrounding area, but over the last few years, due to the environmental changes including massive droughts and rising global temperatures, the river does not. This, coupled with growing pollution of the water, is making the ability to acquire fresh clean water detrimental to the area and its surrounding population.

The river passes through other villages like Spankharo, Prang Ghar, Palay, Umerzai, Turangzai, Utmanzai and then through one of the tehsil of Charsadda Tangi, and it meets with the Swat River south of Charsadda at Baberra.
