= Charsadda =

Town in Khyber Pakhtunkhwa, Pakistan

Charsadda: چارسده (Pashto); چارسدہ (Urdu)
- City
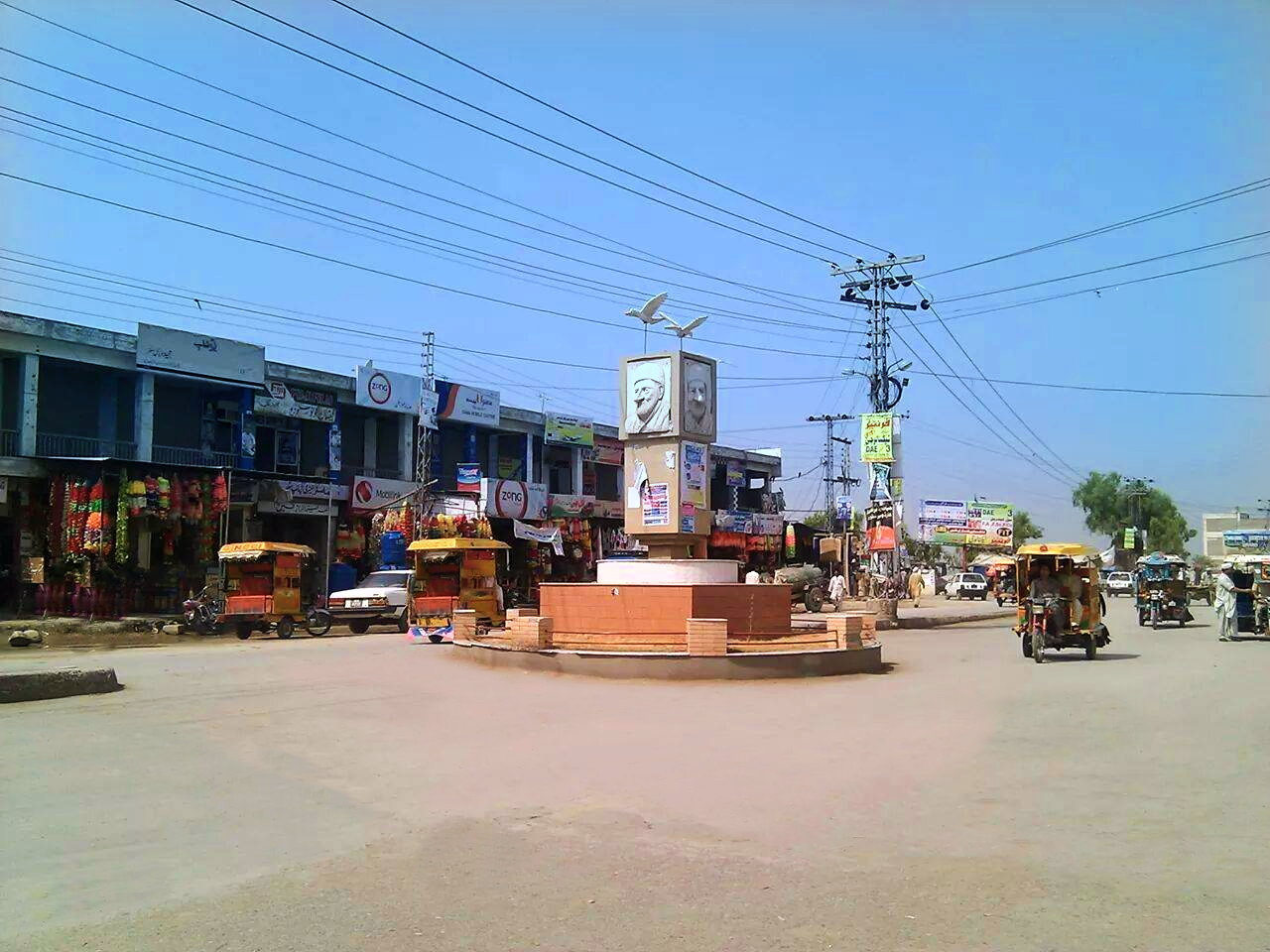
- Bacha Khan chowk

- Location within Pakistan Location within Khyber Pakhtunkhwa
- Coordinates: 34°9′0″N 71°44′0″E
- Country: Pakistan
- Province: Khyber Pakhtunkhwa
- District: Charsadda
- Tehsil: Charsadda

Government
  - Type: Tehsil-council
  - Chairman: Abdul Rauf (JUI-F)

Population (2023)
  - City: 120,170
  - Rank: 102nd in Pakistan
- Time zone: UTC+5 (PKT)

Charsadda (Pashto: چارسده; pronounce; Urdu: چارسدہ; pronounce) is a town and headquarters of Charsadda District, in the Khyber Pakhtunkhwa province of Pakistan. Located in the Valley of Peshawar, Charsadda lies about 29 kilometres (18 mi) from the provincial capital Peshawar at an altitude of 276 metres (906 ft).

== Name ==
The name Chārsadda means "four roads", from the words chār ("four") and sadda ("road"). An alternate explanation, given by Munshi Gopaldas in the 1874 Tawarikh-i Peshawar, is that the city was named after one of the sons of the Pashtun conqueror Ilyas Khan Muhammadzai.

== History ==
The earliest archaeological deposits recovered at Charsadda, in Bala Hisar, are dated to c. 1400 BCE, when a small community was established on a low natural mound of clay above the floodplain of the Kabul and Swat rivers, constructing structures of timber posts slotted into postholes, in association with ceramic sherds and ash. Subsequent periods indicate that more permanent structures were built at Charsadda, including stone-lined pits. Between the 14th century BCE and the 6th century BCE, when an Achaemenid presence is represented at the site (see below), the inhabitants of Charsadda developed an iron-working industry and used ceramics that were typical for this period in the Vale of Peshawar, Swat and Dir. The later history of Charsadda can be traced back to the 6th century BCE. It was the capital of Gandhara from the 6th century BCE to the 2nd century CE. The ancient name of Charsadda was Pushkalavati. The city hosts the ruins of what was once the ancient Gandharan capital city of Pushkalavati (meaning Lotus City in Sanskrit), and the father of Sanskrit grammar, Pāṇini, was from this area and lived around 4th century BCE. Many invaders have ruled over this region during different times of history. These include the Maurya Empire and the Gupta Empire, Alexander the Great's Macedonians, the Greco-Bactrians, the Indo-Greeks, the Indo-Scythians, the Indo-Parthians, the Kushans, the Huns, the Turks, Durranis and more recently the British Empire.

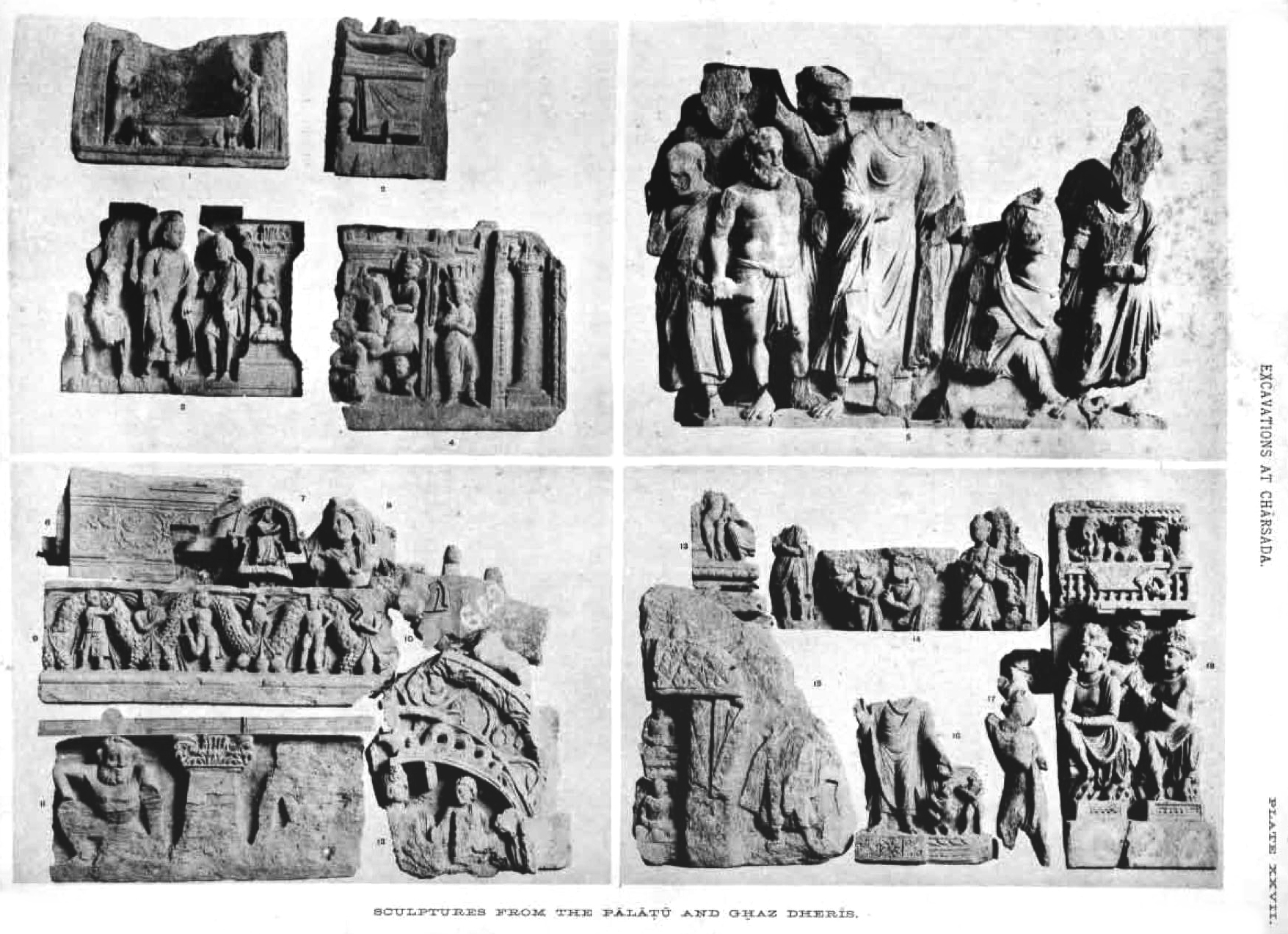
Buddhist statuary obtained in archaeological excavation from Charsadda

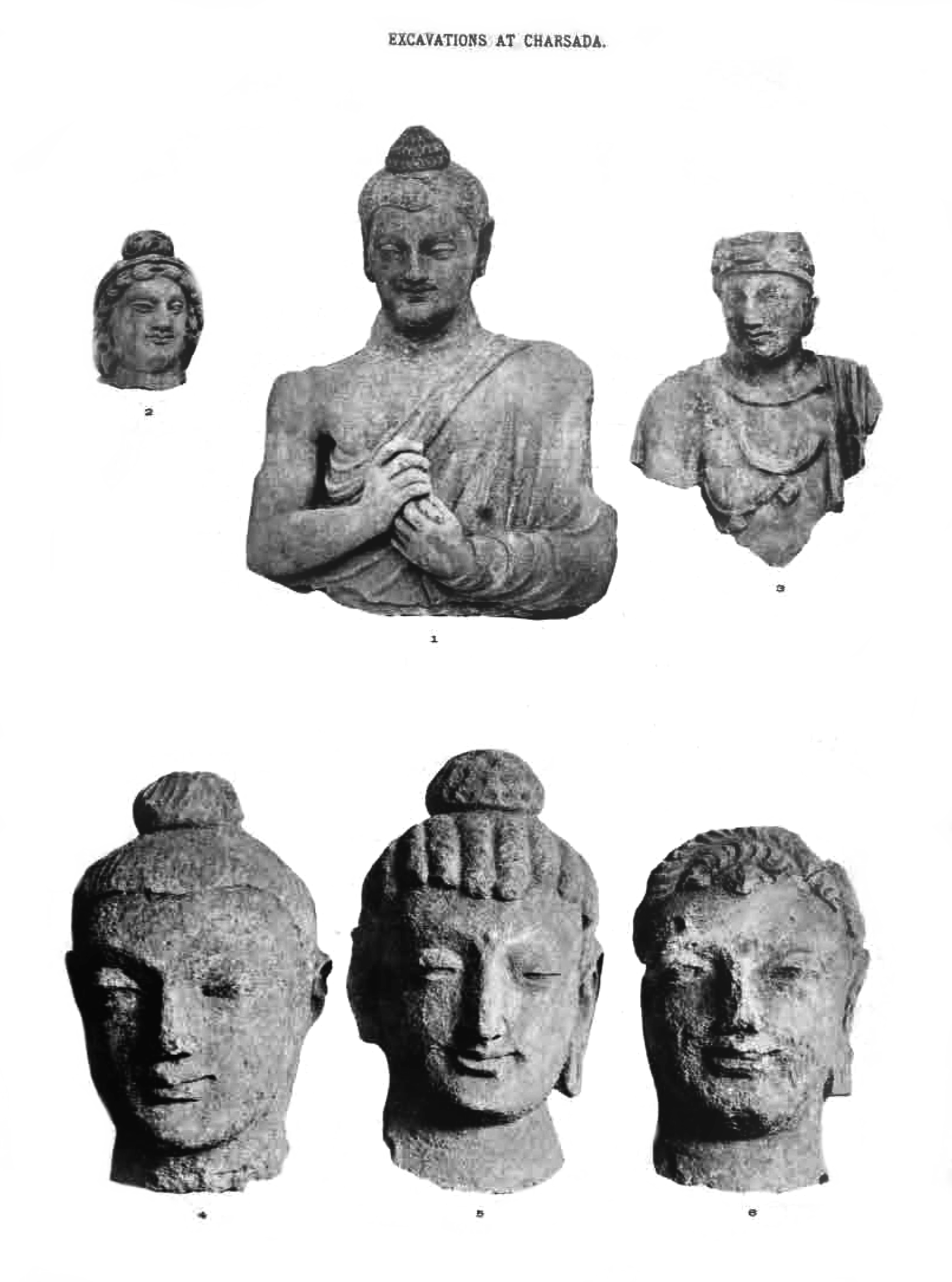
Buddhist statues obtained in archaeological excavation from Charsadda

Charsadda is contiguous to the town of Prang; and these two places were identified by Alexander Cunningham with the ancient Pushkalāvati, capital of the region at the time of Alexander's invasion, and transliterated as Peukelaus or Peukelaotis by the Greek historians. Its chieftain (Astes), according to Arrian, was killed in defence of one of his strongholds after a prolonged siege by Hephaistion. Ptolemy fixes its site upon the eastern bank of the Suastene or Swat. The region was later conquered by Chandragupt Maurya from the Macedonian satraps. The present town of Charsadda is of more recent origin.

== Demographics ==
=== Population ===
Historical population
Year	Pop.	±% p.a.
1951	27,048	—
1961	37,396	+3.29%
1972	45,555	+1.81%
1981	62,530	+3.58%
1998	87,218	+1.98%
2017	114,565	+1.45%
2023	120,170	+0.80%

According to the 2023 census, Charsadda had a population of 120,170.

Languages

Languages of Charsadda City

Languages of Charsadda MC (2023 Census)
1. Pashto (99.2%)
2. Urdu (0.40%)
3. Others (0.40%)

=== Religion ===
Religious groups in Charsadda City (1881−2017) (Note: 1881-1941: Data for the entirety of the town of Charsadda, which included Charsadda Municipality.)
Religious group	1881		1901		1911		1921		1931		1941		2017	
Religious group	Pop.	%	Pop.	%	Pop.	%	Pop.	%	Pop.	%	Pop.	%	Pop.	%
Islam	7,892	94.37%	8,457	92.74%	8,650	94.25%	9,710	94.9%	10,703	92.77%	15,747	93.48%	145,404	99.73%
Hinduism (Note: 1931-1941: Including Ad-Dharmis)	471	5.63%	527	5.78%	201	2.19%	484	4.73%	519	4.5%	745	4.42%	5	0%
Sikhism	0	0%	135	1.48%	326	3.55%	30	0.29%	287	2.49%	294	1.75%	—N/a	—N/a
Jainism	0	0%	0	0%	0	0%	0	0%	0	0%	—N/a	—N/a	—N/a	—N/a
Christianity	—N/a	—N/a	0	0%	1	0.01%	8	0.08%	28	0.24%	54	0.32%	286	0.2%
Zoroastrianism	—N/a	—N/a	0	0%	0	0%	0	0%	0	0%	0	0%	—N/a	—N/a
Judaism	—N/a	—N/a	0	0%	0	0%	0	0%	0	0%	0	0%	—N/a	—N/a
Buddhism	—N/a	—N/a	0	0%	0	0%	0	0%	0	0%	—N/a	—N/a	—N/a	—N/a
Ahmadiyya	—N/a	—N/a	—N/a	—N/a	—N/a	—N/a	—N/a	—N/a	—N/a	—N/a	—N/a	—N/a	106	0.07%
Others	0	0%	0	0%	0	0%	0	0%	0	0%	5	0.03%	0	0%
Total population	8,363	100%	9,119	100%	9,178	100%	10,232	100%	11,537	100%	16,845	100%	145,801	100%

== Rivers ==
Three rivers flow in Charsadda: the River Jindi, the Kabul River and the Swat River; these are the main source of irrigation for Charsadda. The three rivers then merge and join the Indus River.

== Administration ==
The district is administratively subdivided into three tehsils – Charsadda, Tangi, and Shabqadar, which contain a total of 49 Union Councils.

== Education ==
Bacha Khan University is a public university situated in Charsadda, named after Abdul Ghaffar Khan (Bacha Khan).

== Cemetery ==
Charsadda's huge cemetery lies south of the tehsil bazaar. It currently occupies an area of 3x4 km, but it used to be bigger — a lot of the current town has been built on top of the old cemetery, often illegally. Two major roads (the Khushal Khan Khattak and Ali Khan roads) cut across the cemetery from north to south, connecting Charsadda with areas to the south like Prang and Babara. Various other roads also cross over the cemetery, connecting other villages and towns. Heavy traffic like trucks and trailers use these roads, which causes additional stress on the underlying graves.

The age of the cemetery is not known. One local tradition holds that Ahmad Shah Durrani originally endowed the land to the locals as a reward for their military support during his Indian campaigns. Another tradition places it in the 15th century, when there was widespread migration of Pashtun tribes into the Peshawar valley. These migrations would have been accompanied by violent conflict, and the battlefields were supposedly seen as unfit for cultivating or living on after they had been "stained with human blood". According to Qasim Jan Mohammadzai, the cemetery likely originated when the local population converted to Islam and thus began to bury their dead close to their villages. The site chosen for the cemetery would have originally been communal land, known in Pashtun as Shamilat, that had previously been used for cattle grazing.

Each clans (Khels) has its distinct section of the cemetery to bury their dead in. The boundaries between these sections are marked by shallow trenches or brick walls. The Durrani tribe, for example, has their section in the northeast; it is marked off by barbed wire and shaded by tall trees. Most of the graves in this section are decorated with marble slabs; many of them belong to the period of Durrani rule. There are also separate sections for Christians and Ahmadis near the main Janazgah, as well as a separate section for non-locals in the southeastern part of the cemetery. In this section, called the Musafirkhana, anyone may bury without needing prior permission.

Although not as large as the Makli necropolis near Thatta, the Charsadda cemetery has a much higher density of graves. Whereas Makli primarily houses the graves of the ruling class and prominent holy men, Charsadda is used mostly by ordinary people. That said, there are several prominent saints' tombs at Charsadda, as well as royal Durrani graves from their time in power.

Among the saints' tombs at Charsadda are those of Ghazi Gul Baba, Mullah Shah Alam Baba, Mian Sayed Noor Baba, Baba Sahib (aka Ali bin Yousaf Dalazak), Jhare Baba, and Shaheed Baba. These tombs are sites of pilgrimage; annual urs are held where thousands of devotees gather at night to hear qawwals sung in the saints' honour.

South of the main Janazgah, on the right side of the Ali Khan Baba road, there are two prominent enclosures, each marked off with a brick wall and accessed by a gate on the west side. This area is known as the Chardewarai. The larger enclosure houses eight tombs of the Ali Khel clan, who were the local rulers at the time of the Durrani hegemony; its gate is ornately decorated. The other one has the grave of the 18th-century poet Ali Khan. Southwest of these two enclosures is a (now ruined) domed brick mausoleum on a raised platform, said to belong to a holy woman. None of these tombs have any inscriptions providing a specific date for their construction.

One of the most distinct features of the Charsadda cemetery is the way its graves are decorated. About 90% of the graves are decorated with small black and white stones arranged to form geometric or floral designs. This type of decoration is locally known as Da Kanro Gulkari, and the style of grave is known as a Hashtnaghri Qabroona or a Hashtnaghri grave. Some wealthier people's graves are made of brick or marble, but Hashtnaghri graves remain popular because they are cheaper, quickly made, and durable.

Another tradition associated with the Charsadda cemetery is the annual family visits to deceased relatives' graves. These take place both on Ashura, when any necessary repairs to the grave are done, and on the first day of Eid al-Adha celebrations. During the Eid visit, family members arrive early in the morning to recite the Fatiha and the Tilawa; this visit is considered compulsory if the buried person died recently.

== Notable people ==
- Lala Nisar (1930–2016), politician, senator, member of parliament, and cabinet minister.

== See also ==
- Pushkalavati
