= Charsadda District, Pakistan =

Charsadda District ضلع چارسدہ چارسده ولسوالۍ
- District of Khyber Pakhtunkhwa
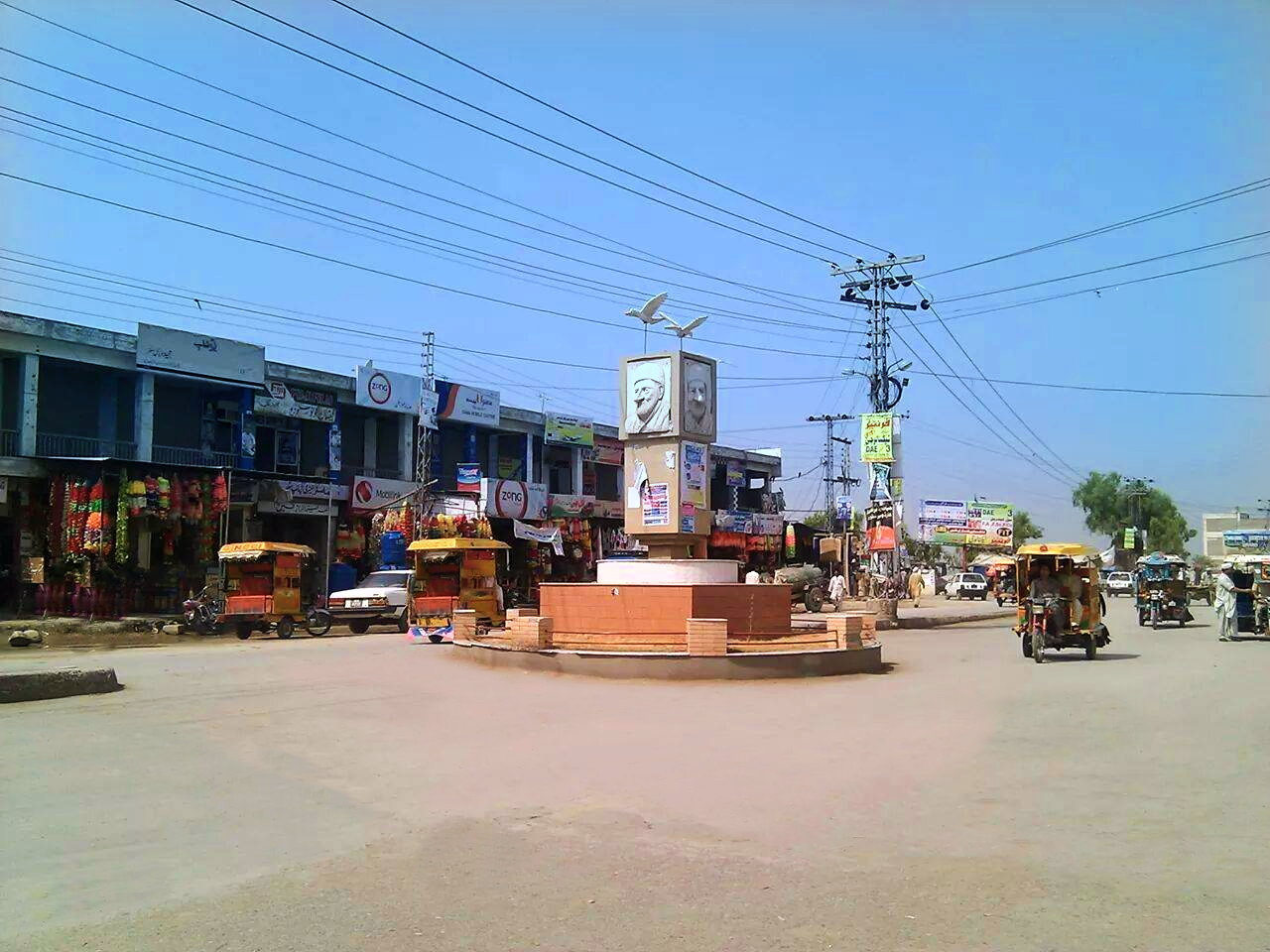
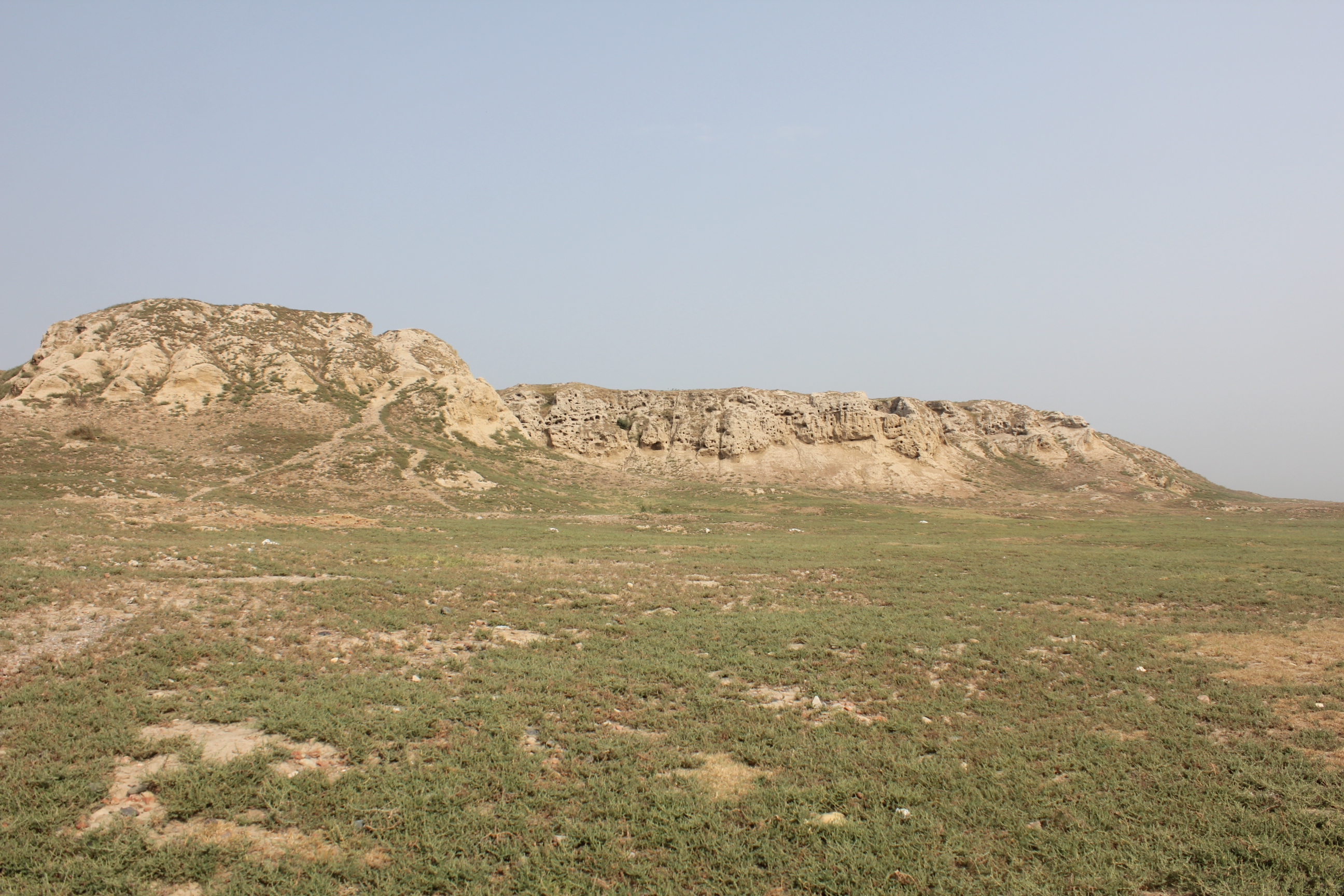
- Top: Bottom: Bacha Khan Square in Charsadda; Bala Hisar mound

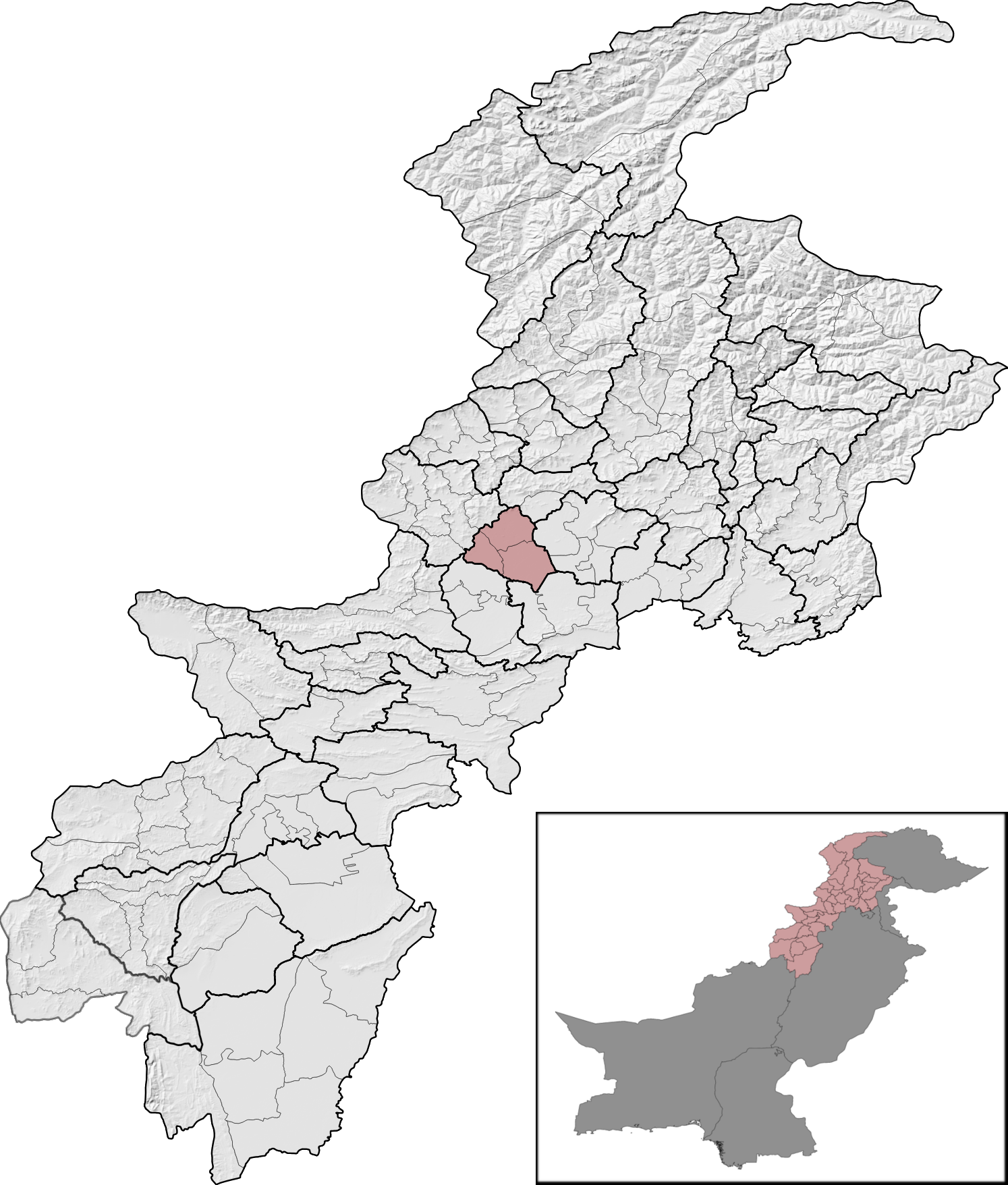
- Charsadda District (red) in Khyber Pakhtunkhwa
- Country: Pakistan
- Province: Khyber Pakhtunkhwa
- Division: Peshawar
- Headquarters: Charsadda

Government
  - Type: District Administration
  - Deputy Commissioner: Saad Hussain
  - District Police Officer: N/A
  - District Health Officer: N/A

Area
  - Total: 996 km^{2} (385 sq mi)

Population (2023)
  - Total: 1,835,504
  - Density: 1,840/km^{2} (4,770/sq mi)
  - Urban: 292,396 (15.93%)
  - Rural: 1,543,108

Literacy
  - Literacy rate: Total: (53.94%); Male: (66.55%); Female: (40.36%)
- Time zone: UTC+5 (PST)
- Number of Tehsils: 3
- Website: charsadda.kp.gov.pk

Charsadda District (Pashto: چارسده ولسوالۍ, Urdu: ضلع چارسدہ) is a district in the Peshawar Division of the Khyber Pakhtunkhwa province of Pakistan. Prior to its establishment as a separate district in 1998, it was a tehsil within the Peshawar District. The district headquarter is the town of Charsadda, which was once part of the Peshawar ex-metropolitan region.

== History ==
The district lies between 34 and 03' and 34-38' north latitudes and 71-28' and 71-53' east longitudes. Charsadda is located in the west of the Khyber Pakhtunkhwa and is bounded by the Malakand District to the north, Mardan district to the east, Nowshera and Peshawar districts to the south and Mohmand district to the west. The district covers an area of 996 square kilometers.

Charsadda was once part of the kingdom of Gandhara. However, around 516 BC Gandhara became part of the seventh satrapy or province of the Achaemenid Empire and paid tribute to Darius the Great of Persia, until it was overthrown by Alexander the Great in the 4th century BC.

After the death of Alexander in 323 BC, the Indian Emperor Chandragupta Maurya rose to power and brought Gandhara under his sway. According to a popular tradition, Emperor Ashoka built one of his stupas there. Actually, there were two stupas built by Ashoka, mentioned by the famous Chinese Buddhist pilgrim Hieun Tsang, who visited it in 630 AD. Both were near the town of Po-Lu-Sha: one was outside the eastern gate of the town, and the other 20 li (10 km) northeast of it, on the mount Dantaloka.

To the east, a Brahminical temple stood while to the north, a monastery was located. According to Buddhists, this monastery was the place where Buddha preached the Law. The name Gandhara went out of usage after Mahmud of Ghazni conquered the area and converted it to Islam in 1026.

The city of Charsadda, originally known as Pushkalavati, is mentioned in the Hindu epic story the Ramayana, where Bharata brings this new conquered city to one of his sons, Pushkala.

Bala Hisar was excavated twice by the head of the Archaeological Survey of India, Sir John Marshall, in 1902 and by Sir Mortimer Wheeler in 1958. According to the South Asian Archaeology Research Group of Bradford University, Wheeler suggested that Bala Hisar "was founded by the Persians in the sixth century BC as a colony guarding the eastern edge of their empire".

== Demographics ==
Historical population
Year	Pop.	±% p.a.
1951	282,618	—
1961	364,088	+2.57%
1972	513,193	+3.17%
1981	630,811	+2.32%
1998	1,022,364	+2.88%
2017	1,610,960	+2.42%
2023	1,835,504	+2.20%

As of the 2023 census, Charsadda district has a population of 1,835,504 in 263,934 households. The district has a sex ratio of 107.49 males to 100 females and a literacy rate of 53.94%: 66.55% for males and 40.36% for females. 542,879 (29.58% of the surveyed population) are under 10 years of age. 292,426 (15.93%) live in urban areas. Pashto is the predominant language, spoken by 99.66% of the population.

Religion in contemporary Charsadda District
Religious group	1941		2017		2023	
Religious group	Pop.	%	Pop.	%	Pop.	%
Islam	239,634	98.11%	1,610,087	99.95%	1,830,646	99.76%
Hinduism	2,533	1.04%	38	0%	41	~0%
Sikhism	1,940	0.79%	—N/a	—N/a	14	~0%
Christianity	127	0.05%	518	0.03%	4,392	0.24%
Others	12	0.01%	317	0.02%	43	~0%
Total Population	244,246	100%	1,610,960	100%	1,835,136 (Note: Different from official population figure since it excludes sensitive areas where religion was not asked)	100%
Note: 1941 census data is for Charsadda tehsil of erstwhile Peshawar district, which roughly corresponds to contemporary Charsadda district. District and tehsil borders have changed since 1941.

== Administration ==
The district is administratively subdivided into 3 Tehsils comprising a total of 58 Union Councils:

Tehsil	Urdu Name	Pashto Name	Area (km^{2})	Pop. (2023)	Density (ppl/km^{2}) (2023)	Literacy rate (2023)	Union Councils
Charsadda Tehsil	تحصیل چارسدہ	چارسدې تحصیل	445	909,438	2,043.68	58.56%	34
Shabqadar Tehsil	تحصیل شب قدر	شب قدر تحصیل	204	440,524	2,159.43	49.65%	12
Tangi Tehsil	تحصیل تنگی	تنګي تحصیل	347	485,542	1,399.26	48.85%	12

=== National Assembly Seats ===
The district is represented in the National Assembly by two MNAs who represent the following constituencies:

Constituency	MNA	Party
NA-24 (Charsadda-I)	Malik Anwar Taj	SIC
NA-25 (Charsadda-II)	Fazal Muhammad Khan	SIC

=== Provincial Assembly Seats ===
In 2018, the district was represented in the Provincial Assembly by five MPAs who represented the following constituencies:

Member of Provincial Assembly	Party affiliation	Constituency	Year
Khalid Khan	Pakistan Tehreek-e-Insaf	PK-59 (Charsadda-I)	2018
Shakeel Bashir Khan	Awami National Party	PK-60 (Charsadda-II)	2018
Sultan Mohammad Khan	Pakistan Tehreek-e-Insaf	PK-61 (Charsadda-III)	2018
Fazle Shakoor Khan	Pakistan Tehreek-e-Insaf	PK-62 (Charsadda-IV)	2018
Mohammad Arif	Pakistan Tehreek-e-Insaf	PK-63 (Charsadda-V)	2018

== Important places ==
=== Shabqadar ===
Shabqadar is a tehsil within the District Charsadda. It is 17 miles (27 km) northwest of Peshawar. A fort was built here by the Sikhs called Sharkargarh. The town was burnt by the Mohmands in 1897. It has since been rebuilt.

=== Bibi Syeda Dheri ===
Bibi Syeda Dheri is a site half a mile to the north of Umarzai village in Charsadda tehsil. At this location, a mound rises to a height of 60 ft (18 m). It is believed to be the site of the stupa erected to commemorate the conversion by Buddha of goddess Hariti who used to devour children of the locality. There is also a shrine of a lady saint Bibi Syeda.

=== Shar-i-Napursan ===
Shar-i-Napursan is an archaeological site in Charsadda tehsil near the village Rajjar. Excavations have unearthed two distinct settlements of the Buddhist period and two of the Muslim period. Coins of Menander, Hermaeus and Kanishka have been unearthed.

=== Palatu Dheri ===
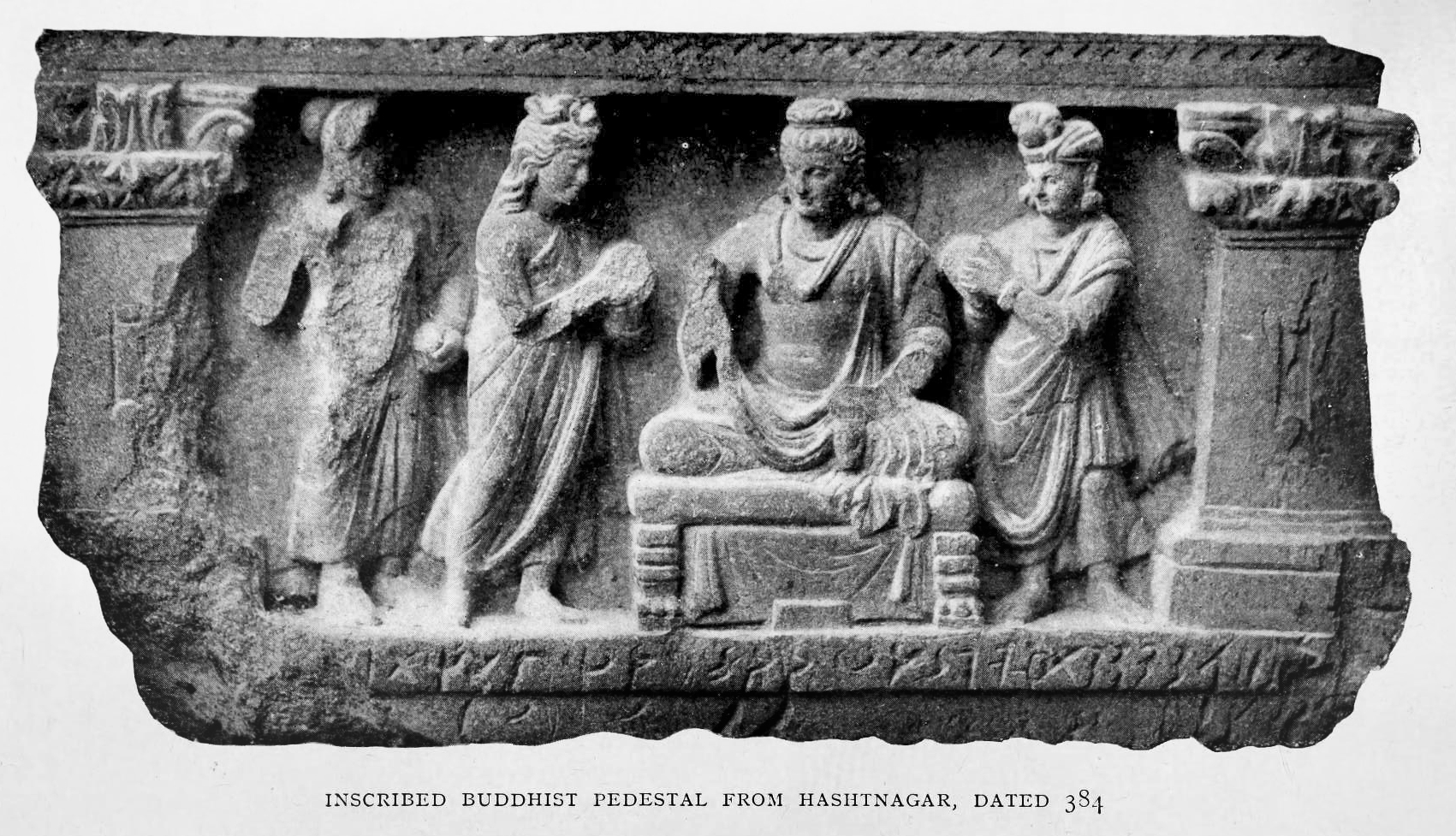
Piedestal of a Buddha statue, with Year 384 inscription, from Palatu Dheri.

Palatu Dheri is another archaeological site near Charsadda tehsil. A mile from Shar-i-Napursan is a mound which contains the remains of a stupa, which according to Hieun Tsiang, was built by one Deven. Some coins which connect them both to the first century AD have been unearthed. Other finds include the image of the goddess Kalika. Three inscribed jars, which were presented by some laymen to "the Community of the Four Quarters", are now in the Peshawar Museum.

=== Towns and villages ===
- Sardheri
- Sukar
- Ambhader
- Daulat Pura
- Kangra

== See also ==
- Akbar Khan (Pakistani general)

== Bibliography ==
- 1998 District census report of Charsadda. Census publication. Vol. 68. Islamabad: Population Census Organization, Statistics Division, Government of Pakistan. 2000.
