= Miangul =

Miangul is a given name. Notable people with the name include:

- Miangul Adnan Aurangzeb (1960–2022), Pakistani engineer and member of Parliament
- Miangul Aurangzeb (1928–2014), the last Wali Ahad (Crown Prince) of the former Swat State
- Miangul Hassan Aurangzeb (born 1970), Pakistani barrister and judge
- Miangul Jahanzeb (1908–1987), the Wāli of Swat from 1949 to 1969
- Miangul Abdul Wadud (Badshah Sahib), the Wāli of Swat from 1926 until his abdication in 1949
- Miangul Asfandyar Amir Zeb (1965–2007), Pakistani politician, member of the Swat royal family

== See also ==
- Miangul Abdul Haq Jahanzeb Kidney Hospital in Manglawar, Swat
