= Safiullah Khan Tanoli =

British army officer and Pakistani politician

- Jagirdar; Sir; Muhammad Safiullah Khan
- Safiullah Khan Tanoli in 1923

Minister of Defence of Kingdom of Amb
- In office: 1923 - 1944
- Born: 6 November 1894; Amb, British India
- Died: 12 August 1974 (aged 74); Rawalpindi
- Burial: 1974; Rawalpindi
- Spouse: 3 Wife's Unknown
Names
- Muhammad Safiullah Khan Tanoli
- Dynasty: Tanoli
- Father: Hussain Khan Tanoli
- Religion: Sunni Islam
- Military career
- Conflicts: World War I World War II Battle of Chamla Indo-Pakistani War of 1947–1948

Muhammad Safiullah Khan Tanoli was the Khan of Ashra, a small principality under the State of Amb and the Minister of Defence of the Nawab of Amb. Ashra was renowned for its arms and ordnance production, including the manufacture and maintenance of firearms, ammunition, and artillery pieces such as howitzers. It was also associated with the production of the zamburak, a small swivel-mounted artillery weapon famously used in South Asian warfare, including the Third Battle of Panipat (1761). Ashra is also regarded in local historical traditions as one of the early settlements associated with the Tanoli expansion into the region.

He fought in the Battle of Chamla and in the Indo-Pakistani War of 1947–1948.

Safiullah Khan Tanoli in 1923

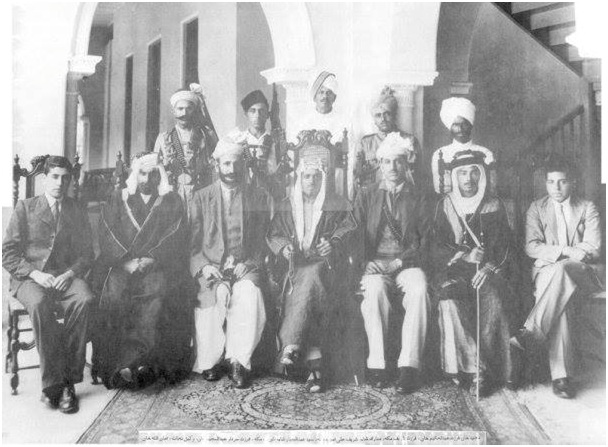
Right from Fourth Abdulaziz of Saudi Arabia when he was the Governor of Mecca right from third Qatar Rulers Left from Third Syed Abdul Jabbar Shah Prime Minister of Amb State Left from Second Salim Al-Mubarak Al-Sabah Left from first Safiullah Khan Tanoli and Governor of Madina at Sethana Palace Darband in 1923.

== Personal life ==
He was the son of Hussain Khan Tanoli . He spent his youth in France, Germany and London. He served his military career in the British Raj. Muhammad Khan Zaman Khan summoned him to return to the Battle of Chamla. He also worked with Syed Abdul Jabbar Shah. He controlled all the police stations of Darband, Amb. He was also known as Afsar-e-Darband (افسردربند).
