= List of buildings and structures built during the Swat (princely state) =

The former princely state of Swat (1926-1969) is known for its buildings, roads and architecture. These buildings show the quality and architectural design of that time. These buildings serve as benchmarks of architecture, style and stability. A brief description of some of these buildings and structures is given below:

== List ==
- Wadudia Hall
- White Palace
- Royal Palace Saidu Sharif
- Palace of the last Wāli of Swat
- Tomb of Akhund of Swat
- Saidu Baba Mosque
- Mausoleum of Badshah Sahib
- The Central Hospital, Swat
- Saidu Hospital
- Allah-o-Akbar Mosque
- Wadudia High School Saidu Sharif
- Serena Hotel, Swat
- Jahanzeb College
- Swat Museum

== See also ==
- Swat District
- Swat (princely state)
- White Palace (Marghazar)
