= Miangul Hassan Aurangzeb =

Pakistani barrister and judge

Mr. Justice Miangul Hassan Aurangzeb

Justice of the Supreme Court of Pakistan
- Incumbent
- Assumed office 14 February 2025

Justice of the Islamabad High Court
- In office 24 December 2015 – 14 February 2025

Personal details
- Born: September 14, 1970 (age 55) Saidu Sharif, Swat District, Khyber Pakhtunkhwa, Pakistan)
- Relations: Miangul Aurangzeb (father); Miangul Adnan Aurangzeb (brother)
- Known for: Lawyer and Judge

Miangul Hassan Aurangzeb (born 1970) is a Pakistani barrister and judge currently serving as a judge of the Supreme Court of Pakistan. Prior to his appointment, he served as a Judge of Islamabad High Court. He has recently been appointed a Judge of the apex court by the Judicial Council of Pakistan.

Miangul Hasan Aurangzeb is the son of Miangul Aurangzeb and his wife Nasim. Nasim, daughter of Pakistani Field Marshal Ayub Khan (President of Pakistan).

Aurangzeb is the paternal grandson of the former Wāli of Swat Miangul Jahan Zeb, and the maternal grandson of Mohammad Ayub Khan, a former President of Pakistan. His father, Miangul Aurangzeb, was the governor of Khyber Pakhtunkhwa Province.

His primary school was the Sangota in his family's traditional residence Swat. He started attending Army Burn Hall College in Abbottabad in 1980 a successor to Burn Hall College and School founded by British missionaries but acquired and converted to a military school in 1977. Aurangzeb obtained his Cambridge/O levels from Burn Hall in 1988. He moved to Islamabad for additional education at Froebel's International School in Islamabad and completed A level. In 1991 he was awarded a scholarship from the British Foreign and Commonwealth Office and moved to Britain. Aurangzeb studied for his Baccalaureate at the University of Wales in Cardiff, Wales. Subsequently, he moved to London where he studied corporate and commercial law at the School of Oriental and Asian Studies of the University of London. On graduation in 1994 he was accepted into Lincoln's Inn one of the world's most prestigious professional bodies of judges and lawyers.

He moved back to Pakistan in 1996 and became an Advocate at Swat District Court. As the ruler his grandfather Miangul Jehan Zeb who served as Wāli Jahan Zeb of Swat had operated a court which had full jurisdiction and authority. This was previous to incorporation of Swat into Pakistan under civil administration in 1969. After abdication Miangul Zehan Zeb and Miangul Aurangzeb continued acting as informal civil mediators.

In 1997 Miangul Hassan Aurangzeb was admitted as a barrister before the Sindh High Court and Islamabad High Court. He worked in the law firm of Hafeez Pirzada Law Associates founded by Abdul Hafeez Pirzada in which he was made a partner. In 2008 he was admitted to practice before the Pakistan Supreme Court. He is a governor of the Overseas Pakistani Foundation and a member of the Supreme Court Bar Association of Pakistan. Miangul Hassan Aurangzeb was made an Additional Judge of the Islamabad High Court in December 2015. In February 2025 the Judicial Commission of Pakistan appointed Miangul Hassan Aurangzeb a Supreme Court Justice of Pakistan.
