= Parvesh Shaheen =

Pakistani historian and author (born 1944)

Muhammad Parvesh Shaheen محمد پرويش شاهين
- Born: 12 October 1944; Manglawar, Swat, North-West Frontier Province, British India (present-day Khyber Pakhtunkhwa, Pakistan)
- Occupations: Teacher, Author
- Writing career
- Genre: History

Muhammad Parvesh Shaheen (also spelled Mohammad Perwesh Shaheen; Pashto: محمد پرویش شاھین, born 12 October 1944) is a Pakistani historian and author from Manglawar, Swat. Shaheen is the author of more than 45 books in Pashto, Urdu and English. He has a library of over 30,000 preserved texts.

== Early life and education ==
Shaheen was born on 12 October 1944 to a middle-class family in Manglawar, a village 8 km east of Mingora. He attained his early education at Primary School Manglawar. He received his master's degree in Pashto from the University of Peshawar, his master's degree in history from the University of Punjab, his master's degree in Urdu from the University of Peshawar, his master's of Education from the University of Punjab, and a Graduate Certificate in sociology from AIOU Islamabad. Shaheen is a gold medalist from the University of Peshawar. He served as Principal Government at Higher Secondary School Peshawar in Grade 19.

== Career ==
=== Writing ===
Shaheen started writing for the Daily Shahbaz Peshawar in 1958, when he was in 7th standard. He wrote hundreds of articles in papers, newspapers, magazines and journals. He has written essays for every leading journal in Pakistan and other national standard journals since 1980.

=== Academia ===
Shaheen worked with Japan Province Project from 1998 until 2000 as chairman. He worked at Kalam Development Project of Switzerland as a culture consultant. He worked at Allai Dam Hydel Project Batagram. Shaheen worked as a research scholar for Ancient Wooden Museum Preservation at Lok-Versa Islamabad, and as literary and culture adviser to the Commissioner of Malakand Division since 1985.

=== Linguistics ===
Shaheen is a member of the New Alphabet Committee at Pashto Academy Peshawar. He worked as a review expert on the Pashto Computerized Alphabet Committee Islamabad in 2005. He was a Director of National Language Authority for the Government of Khyber Pakhtunkhwa. Shaheen also worked on Kalasha language.

=== Other ===
He buried archaeological remains in dirt during the insurgency period so they could be preserved. He later worked as a volunteer with an Italian mission in the reconstruction of a statue of Buddha. During Swat operations, Shaheen opposed the Taliban. As a prominent figure, he was beaten, injured and had damage caused to his personal library by the Taliban.

== Works ==
=== Pashto Books ===
چاپ کال	چاپ کونکي	کتاب نوم	شميره
1985	پشتو اکيډمي پشاور	د پختونخوا او کوهستاني ژبو لساني تړون	1
1988	شعيب سنز منيګوره سوات	د سوات ګلونه	2
1989	شعيب سنز منيګوره سوات	د پختونخوا ګلونه	3
1989	شعيب سنز منيګوره سوات	ګل ورينےسوکے	4
1989	شعيب سنز منيګوره سوات	د پختنو ژوند ژواک	5
1990	شعيب سنز منيګوره سوات	سوات د سردرو وطن	6
1991	شعيب سنز منيګوره سوات	پښتانه او شلمه پيړئ	7
1991	ساپي پبلشر پشاور	د پختنو ليک دود تاريخ	8
2015	ساپي پبلشر پشاور	د سوات منظوم تاريخونه	9
2015	ساپي پبلشر پشاور	د پختو ژبے اصل نسل	10
-	-	اقبال او پښتانه	11
-	-	پښتو په سوات کښي	12
-	-	د سوات تاريخ د ټپو په رنړا کښي	13
-	-	د سوات تاريخ د متلونو په رنړا کښي	14
-	-	د مورنو ژبو ورځ	15
-	-	ورکيدونکي ژبے	16
-	-	حافظ الپورئ	17
	-	سيدو بابا	18

=== Urdu Books ===
سال	پبلشر	نام کتاب	نمبر شمار
1985	پشتو اکیڈمی پشاور یونیورسٹی	پشتو اور کوہستانی زبانوں کا لسانی رابطہ	1
1988	شعیب سنز مینگورہ،	مشرق کا سوئیٹزرلینڈ	2
1988	شعیب سنز مینگورہ،	اباسین کوہستان	3
1991	سرحد اردو اکیڈمی ایبٹ آباد	کافرستان	4
1992	شعیب سنز مینگورہ	کالام کوہستان	5
1999	فکشن ہاوس مزنگ روڈ لاہور	کالام سے کافرستان تک	6
2007	جمال اکیڈمی اردو بازار لاہور	سوات کوہستان	7
2007	جمال اکیڈمی اردو بازار لاہور	وادی سوات	8
2007	جمال اکیڈمی اردو بازار لاہور	چترال	9
2007	جمال اکیڈمی اردو بازار لاہور	کافرستان کے رسم و رواج	10
2007	جمال اکیڈمی اردو بازار لاہور	دیر کوہستان	11
2014	جمال اکیڈمی اردو بازار لاہور	کافرستان کا جائزہ	12
2015	جمال اکیڈمی اردو بازار لاہور	مہاتما گوتم بدھ سوات میں	13
2015	جمال اکیڈمی اردو بازار لاہور	مظفر آباد سے شاردا تک	14
2015	جمال اکیڈمی اردو بازار لاہور	کوہستان کے معدوم ہونے والی زبانیں	15
2015	جمال اکیڈمی اردو بازار لاہور	کاغان سے ناران تک	16
2015	جمال اکیڈمی اردو بازار لاہور	بچوں کی کہانیاں	17
-	جمال اکیڈمی اردو بازار لاہور	غذر کا نسلی او سانی جائزہ	18
-	جمال اکیڈمی اردو بازار لاہور	سوات کوہستان کا نسلی، لسانی، ثقافتی جائزہ	19
-	جمال اکیڈمی اردو بازار لاہور	دیر کوہستان کا نسلی، لسانی، ثقافتی اور سیاحتی جائزہ	20
-	جمال اکیڈمی اردو بازار لاہور	کوہستان کا نسلی، لسانی، ثقافتی اور سیاحتی جائزہ	21
-	جمال اکیڈمی اردو بازار لاہور	قدیم پختونخوا کا علمی جائزہ	22
-	جمال اکیڈمی اردو بازار لاہور	شاہان سوات	23
-	جمال اکیڈمی اردو بازار لاہور	سوات کے قدیم سواتی پختون	24
-	جمال اکیڈمی اردو بازار لاہور	تیرات	25
-	جمال اکیڈمی اردو بازار لاہور	شخوڑئ	26
-	جمال اکیڈمی اردو بازار لاہور	بری کوٹ	27
-	جمال اکیڈمی اردو بازار لاہور	اوڈیگرام	28
-	جمال اکیڈمی اردو بازار لاہور	منگلور	29
-	جمال اکیڈمی اردو بازار لاہور	فضاگٹ	30
-	جمال اکیڈمی اردو بازار لاہور	مرغزار	31
-	جمال اکیڈمی اردو بازار لاہور	چکدرہ	32
-	جمال اکیڈمی اردو بازار لاہور	چترال کا نسلی، لسانی،ثقافتی اور سیاحتی جائزہ	33
-	جمال اکیڈمی اردو بازار لاہور	سوات کے قدرتی وسائل	34
-	جمال اکیڈمی اردو بازار لاہور	تاریخ کندیا	35
-	جمال اکیڈمی اردو بازار لاہور	سوات کے قدیم کتبے	36
-	جمال اکیڈمی اردو بازار لاہور	کافرستان کی پریاں	37

== See also ==
- Manglawar
- Buddhist Rock Carvings in Manglawar
- Miangul Abdul Haq Jahanzeb Kidney Hospital
- Tehsil Babuzai
- Swat District
