= Muhammad Khan Zaman Khan =

Nawab of Amb from 1907 to 1936

Muhammad Khan Zaman Khan Tanoli (محمد خان زمان خان تنولی)
- Nawab; Nawab Shahib; His Honourable Highness
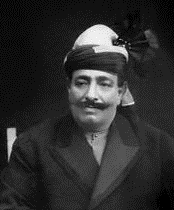
- Portrait picture of Nawab Zaman Khan

10th Nawab of Kingdom of Amb
- Reign: 1907–1936
- Successor: Muhammad Farid Khan
- Born: 6 November 1874; Amb, Pakistan
- Died: 12 September 1936; Darband, Khyber Pakhtunkhwa
- Burial: 1936; Darband, Khyber Pakhtunkhwa
Names
- Nawab Sir Muhammad Khan Zaman Khan Tanoli
- Dynasty: Tanoli
- Father: Muhammad Akram Khan
- Religion: Sunni Islam
- Awards: Knight Grand Commander (GCSI); Knight Commander (KCIE); Knight Grand Cross (GCMG)
- Military career
- Allegiance: British Rule
- Rank: Honorary Major General
- Conflicts: Battle of Chamla; Fall of Baghdad (1917); Gallipoli campaign

Nawab Sir Muhammad Khan-i-Zaman Khan Tanoli KCIE GCMG also known as Khan-i-Zaman Khan, was the ruling Nawab of the princely state of Amb from 1907 until his death in 1936 in his region Darband become a biggest trade market of India.

The son of Nawab Muhammad Akram Khan, whom he succeeded in 1907, the Nawab helped the British in carrying out several of the later Black Mountain expeditions to Kala Dhaka/Tor Ghar. In 1919 he sent a force which fought against the Wali of Swat at the Battle of Chamla.

According to some accounts, he provided food, artillery, goods and reliance support to Khalil Pasha's forces. However, as the ruler of an Indian princely state under British Raj, he was unable to take part or form an alliance with British or the Ottoman, keeping his forces uninvolved during the Fall of Bagdad (1917). Nawab had a good relationship with Ottoman Sultan and the extreme support to Ottoman Empire at a very difficult quite time was very reliable. As well as being a knight commander of the Order of the Indian Empire, the Nawab held the rank of Honorary Major in the Indian Army.

From his time as used in perpetuity by him and his descendants.

This picture is from 1917, Darband. In this photo: Nawab Sir Muhammad Khan Zaman Khan Tanoli (seated second from left), Sir George Roos-Keppel (seated third from left), Sahibzada Sir Abdul Qayyum Khan (seated first from right). (Sitting ground centre) Nawabzada Muhammad Farid Khan Tanoli (son and successor of Nawab Sir Muhammad Khan Zaman Khan of Amb).
