= White Palace (Marghazar) =

Hotel in Marghazar, Pakistan

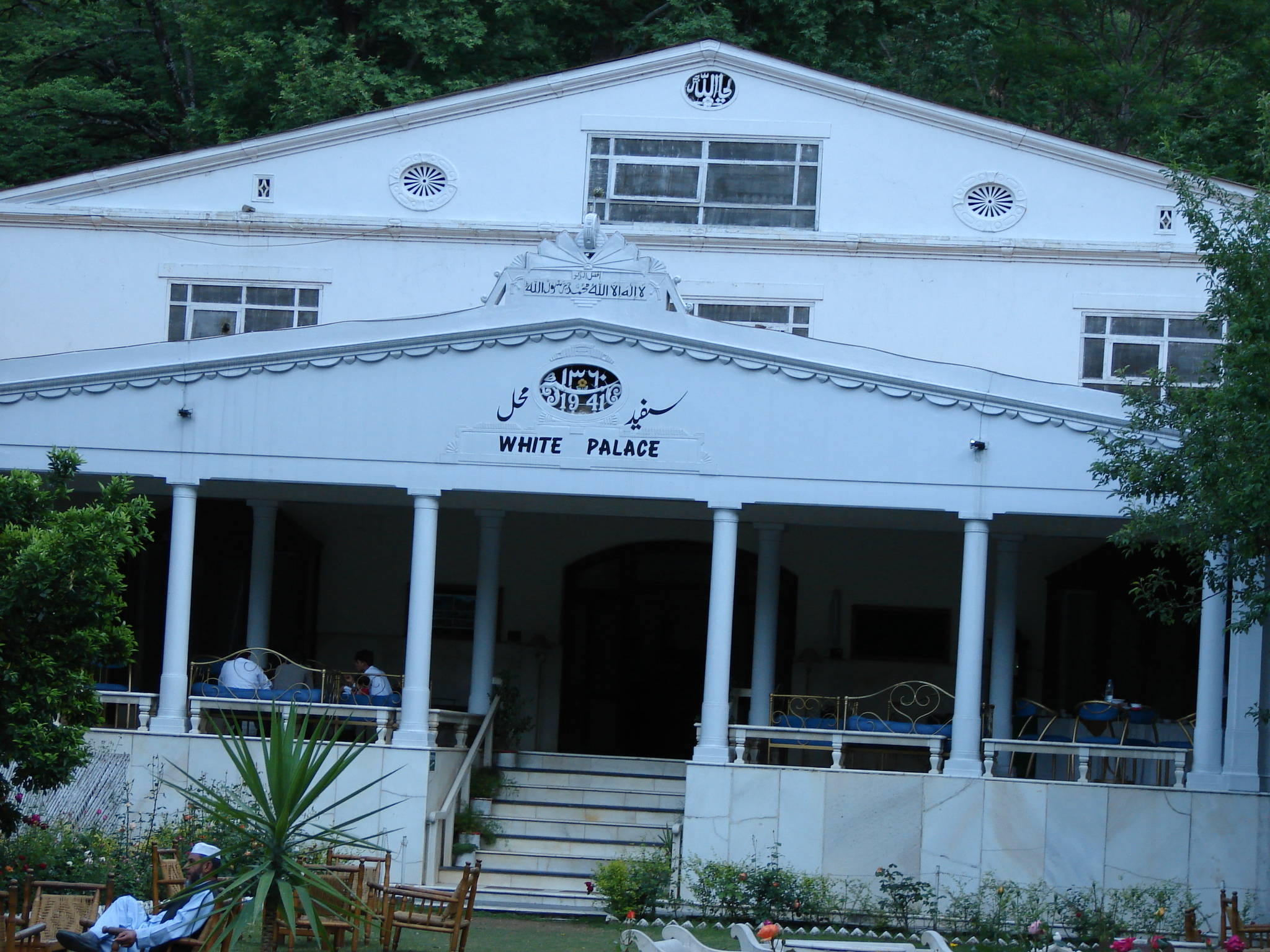
Sufid Mahal Marghazar

The White Palace of Marghazar was built in 1940 by the first king of Swat, Miangul Abdul Wadud (Badshah Sahib) in the small town of Marghazar situated at about 13 kilometers away from Saidu Sharif. The name was given to the palace as it was built of white marble. The name has been changed 3 times first it was named Swati Palace and then Motti Palace and then White Palace. The palace now serves as a hotel. The White Palace at Marghazar was the summer residence of the Wali of Swat, Miangul Jehanzeb. Located at 7,136 feet above sea level on Marghazar Hill, it was later converted into a tourist resort.

== History ==
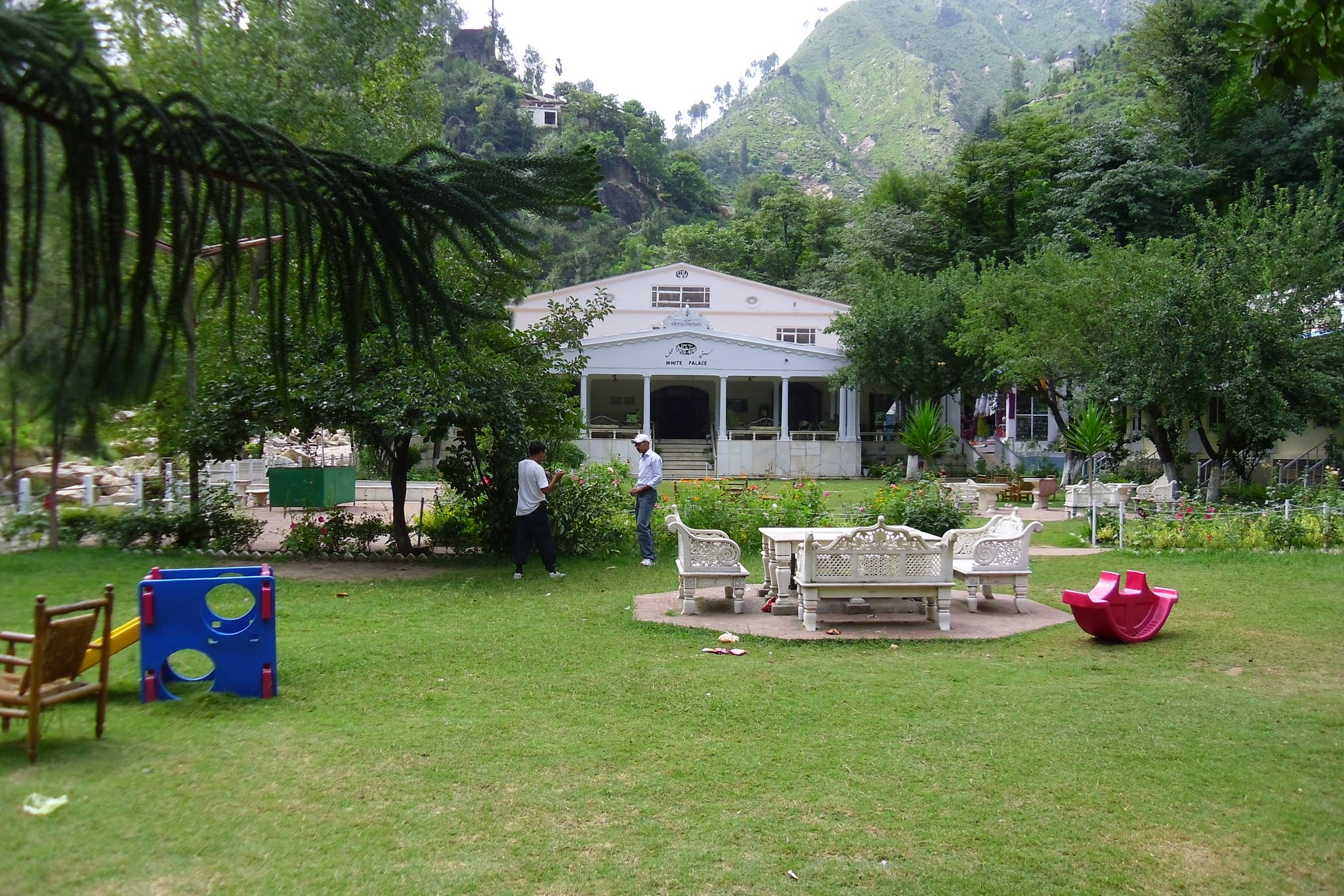
Sufid Mahal Marghazar

The greenery of the gorgeous landscape persuaded the then King of Swat, Miangul Abdul Wadud (Badshah Sahib) in 1935 to build a summer resort here. The King brought marble from Agra, bronze from Belgium, and artisans from Turkey who designed and constructed the palace, completing it in 1941. It was first named Swatti Taj Mahal, later Motti Mahal, and now Sufed Mahal (White Palace). Then it was enriched with selective fauna and flora that made it a mini zoo as well as mini botanical garden. There is also a 200-year-old colossal chinar tree, serving as canopy for visitors.

== Structure ==
There are 24 active spacious decorated rooms and the Royal Suite (ex-King's bedroom) where Elizabeth II, Queen of the United Kingdom, and Prince Philip, Duke of Edinburgh stayed for three days in 1961. There are two big conference halls where King Abdul Wadood used to hold cabinet meetings. There is the King's lobby which has a beautiful view of the garden lawn. On the right side, there is a king's veranda to have a glimpse of a swirling stream of water. On the left side of the palace is situated a six-roomed Lord's Block for the residence of ministers and advisors. On the upper portion of the palace, there is the eight-roomed Prince Block, it is an enclave in trees and shrubs. Climbing further stairs, there is a twelve-roomed Queen's block. King Abdul Wadood had two wives so he built this block in a way that each wife got 3 rooms, 3 servant rooms, and a separate lawn in her share. The counterpart portion of the second wife is a replica of the first one. In front of the lawn, there is a single balcony with marble benches and a table with engraved paintings of grapes.

== Raw materials ==
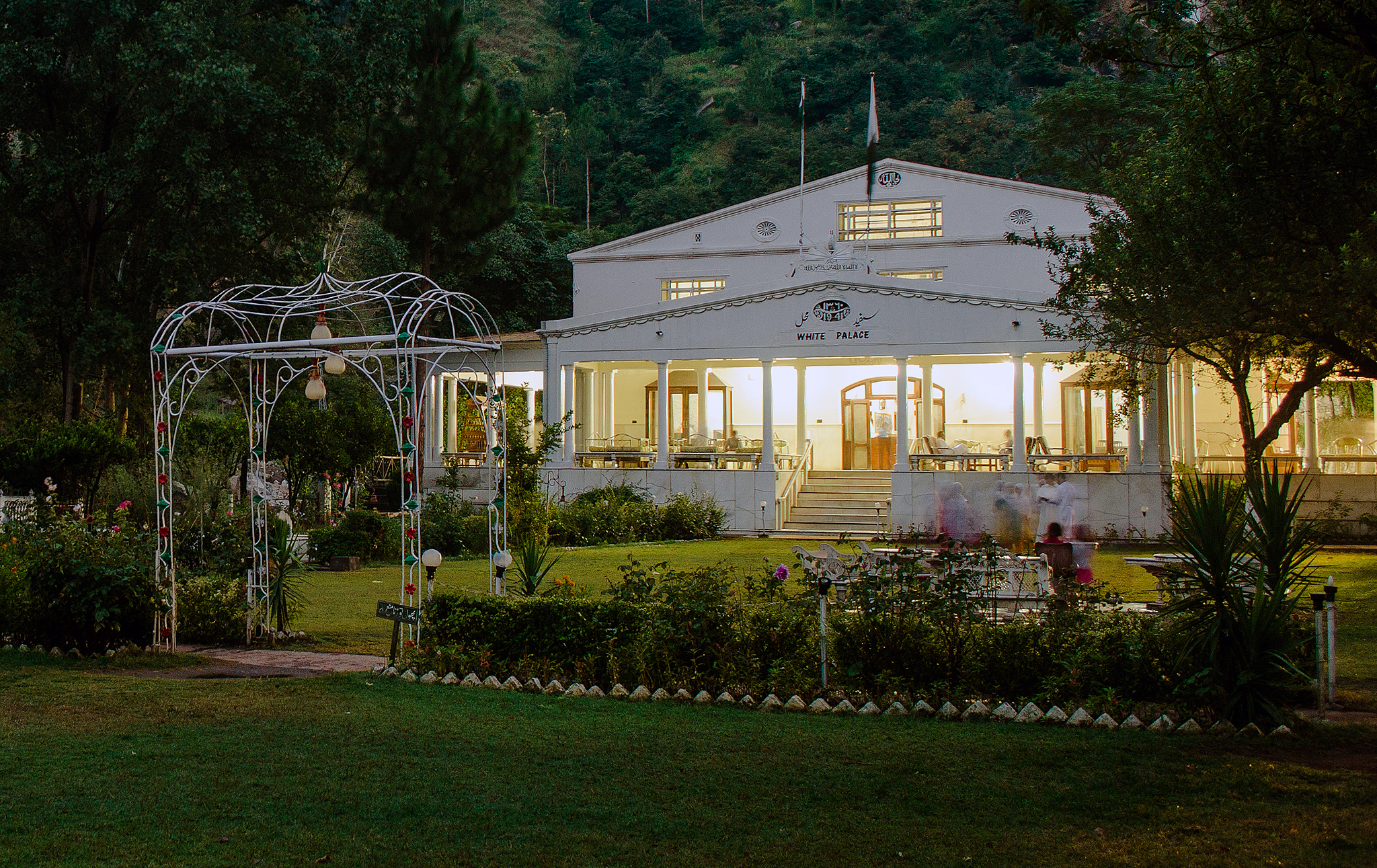
Sufid Mahal Marghazar night view

The material for the White Palace was imported from Jaypure India, the same quarry that supplied marble to the Taj Mahal Agra. Chuna (lime) is used as binding material in place of cement. It is so compact to be drilled. The height of the ceiling is 30–35 ft to give extra strength and ward off heat. Ceiling fans were imported and installed in 1941 and are still working.

After the death of Wadud of Swat, Miangul Asfandyar Amir Zeb became the owner. Now it is owned jointly by Miangul Shahriyar Amir Zeb and the three daughters of the late Miangul Asfandyar Amir Zeb.

The White Palace is now converted into a hotel and has become a tourist attraction during the summer.

== See also ==
- Swat District
- Swat (princely state)
- Miangul Jahanzeb
- Marghazar
