= Shingrai Waterfall =

Waterfall in Khyber Pakhtunkhwa, Pakistan

- Shingrai Waterfall Photo
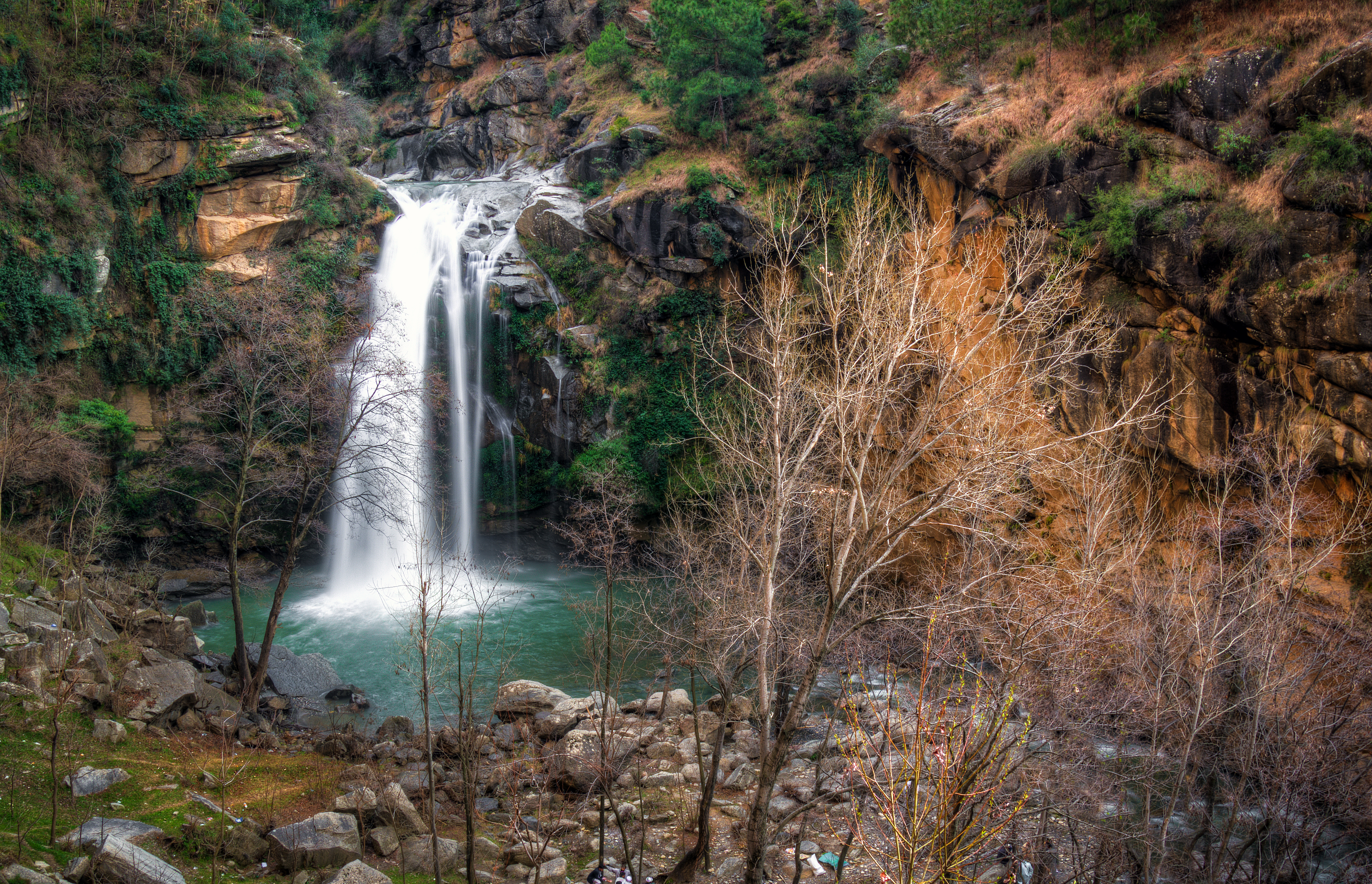
- Shingrai Waterfall, Manglawar
- Interactive map of Shingrai Waterfall
- Location: Manglawar, Swat, Khyber Pakhtunkhwa, Pakistan
- Coordinates: 34.1956506°N 71.9915226°E
- Elevation: 10,000 feet (3,000 m)
- Total height: 35 ft (11 m)
- Average width: 70 feet (21 m)

Shingrai Waterfall (Urdu: شنگرئی آبشار) also known as Shingro Dand (Pashto: شنگرو ڈنڈ) is a waterfall located in Shingrai Manglawar in Swat District of Khyber Pakhtunkhwa province, Pakistan. It is known for its high and beautiful surrounding. It is about 18 kilometres (11 mi) from Mingora.

== Etymology of the name ==
The word Shingro or Shingrai is the Pashto name of a village where the waterfall is situated.

== See also ==
- Manglawar
- Jarogo Waterfall
- List of tourist attractions in Swat
- List of waterfalls
- List of waterfalls of Pakistan
