= Manglawar =

- Union council
- manglawar
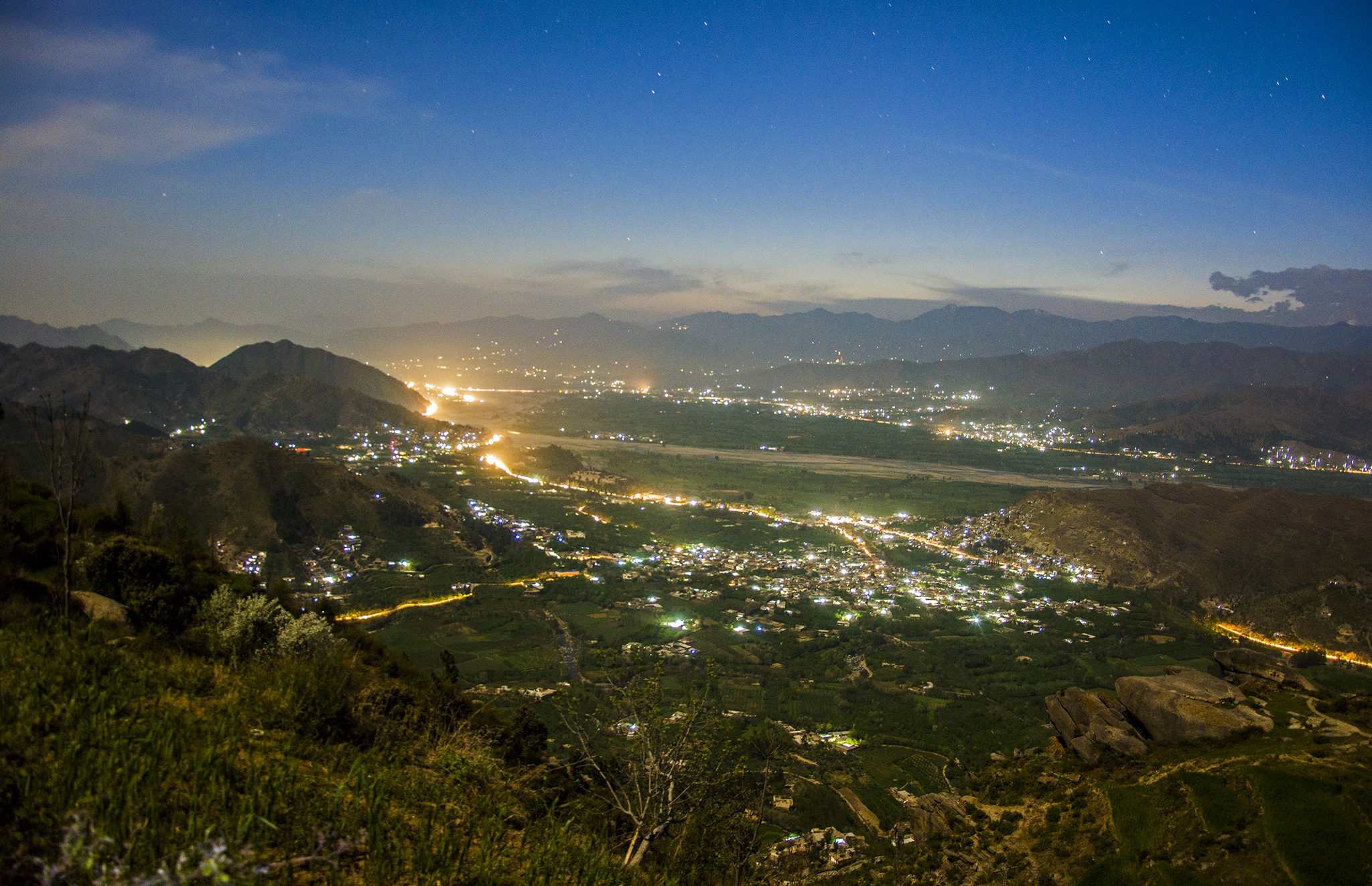
- View of the village
- Nickname: manglawar
- Location within Pakistan
- Coordinates: 34.47°N 72.43°E
- Country: Pakistan
- Province: Khyber-Pakhtunkhwa
- District: Swat
- Tehsil: Tehsil Babuzai
- Union Council: Union Council Manglawar
- Ward (KPK): Ward Manglawar
- Village Council (KPK): VC Manglawar East; VC Manglawar West
- Elevation: 987 m (3,238 ft)

Population (2017)
  - Total: 37,147
- Time zone: UTC+5 (PST)
- Calling code: 0946
- Website: http://manglorswat.blogspot.com/

Manglawar (also spelled Manglor) (Urdu: منگلور; Pashto: منګلور) is an administrative unit, known as Union council of Tehsil Babuzai, of Swat District in the Khyber Pakhtunkhwa province of Pakistan and former capital of Kingdom of Swat. It is located at 34°48'30.7"N 72°25'50.0"E with an average altitude of 987 meters (3,238.19 feet).

== Administrative division ==
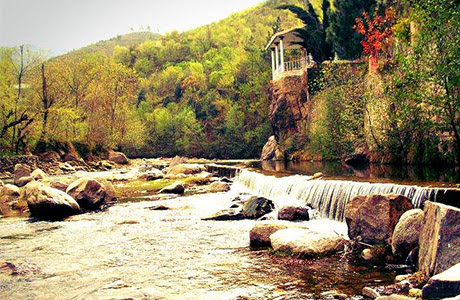
Glimpse of Khambo Dand Manglawar

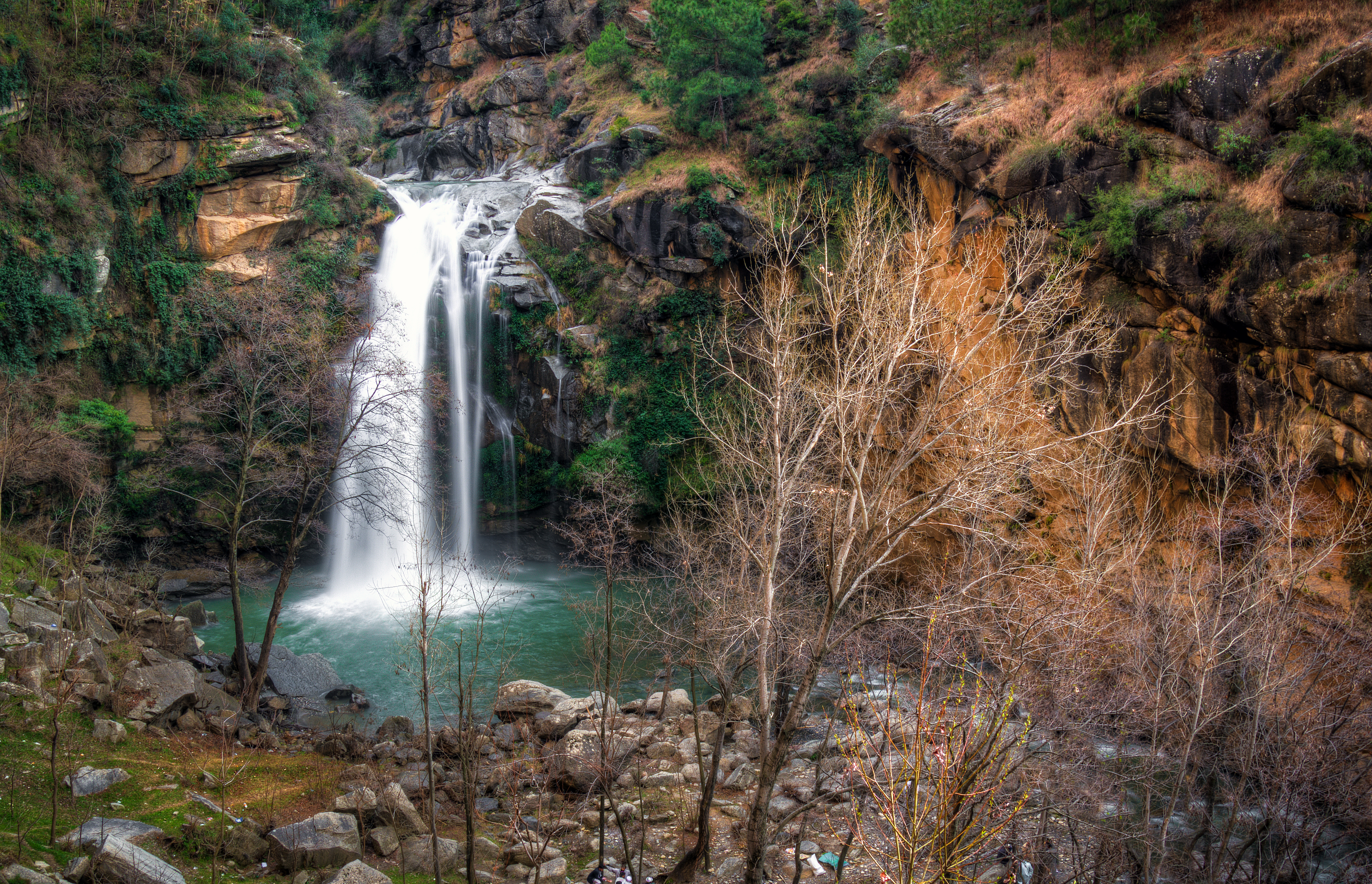
The village is near the Shingrai waterfall.

Manglawar is divided into sub-parts for better administrative hold. Manglawar is divided on the basis of two systems:

- 1967-based:

This division is based upon West Pakistan Land Revenue Act, 1967 (W.P. Act No. XVII of 1967). According to this division Manglawar is Union Council which also includes Union Council Aka Maruf Khel i-e: (Bishbanr, Kass, Banjot & Sar Sardaray) Goratai, Taligram etc. This system is still used in most of Patwar and Land revenue systems.

- KPK Local Government-based:

This division is based upon the Khyber Pakhtunkhwa Local Government System and Act 2013 which was recommended on 31 October 2013, and was practically applied in Local Bodies Election May 2015 by Government of Khyber Pakhtunkhwa by Pakistan Tehreek-e-Insaf officials, as they are ruling at the time. According to Khyber Pakhtunkhwa Local Government Act 2013. District Swat has 67 wards, of which the total number of village councils is 170, and neighborhood councils is 44.

According to this system Manglawar is a ward which is further divided into two village councils:

- Manglawar East
- Manglawar West

=== Manglawar East ===
Manglawar East, also known as Manglawar No.1 or Aka Maruf, is a Village Council. It is situated on East side of Manglawar. Manglawar East is inhabited by Akamaroof Pashtuns which is a sub tribe or clan of Babuzai. Manglawar East, Akamaroof consist of Gudyan Khel, Haqdad Khel, Mazid Khel, Malakanan, Miangan, Mulan and other racial groups. Manglawar East consists of small Mohallas (Mohallas; A bunch of Houses in one place):

1. Shingrai (Pashto: شنګرئ)
2. Salanda (Pashto: سالنډه)
3. Said Abad (Pashto: سيد آباد)
4. Azimabad (Pashto: عظیم آباد)
5. Murad Abad (Pashto: مراد آباد)
6. Gul Mayera (Pashto: ګل ميره)
7. Azgharai (Pashto: ازغرې)
8. Enzartangai (Pashto: انځرتنګې)
9. Dewangai (Pashto: ديوانګې)
10. Batra (Pashto: باترا)
11. Shakhorai (Pashto: شخورئ)
12. Tekai (Pashto: ټکې)
13. Mohalla Haqdad Khel (Pashto: حقداد خيل)
14. Kuz Mazid Khel (Pashto: کوز مزيد خيل)
15. Mazid Khel Bala (Pashto: بر مزيد خيل)
16. Mohalla BakhtMand Khan (Pashto: محله بخت مند خان)
17. Mohalla Gudyan Khel (Pashto: محلّہ گوڈیان خیل)
18. Mohalla Madi Khel (Pashto: محله مدې خيل)
19. Mohalla Saidan (Pashto: محله سيدان)

Manglawar comes in Manglawar Ward No.39 East-1. The following are details on electoral point of view (LG Election 2015):

- Number of registered voters is 9175.
- Of which male is 5055 and female is 4125.
- Charge No: 308
- Circle No: 07
- Block No: 01, 04, 05, 06 & 08
- Block Code: 003080701, 003080704, 003080705, 003080706, 003080708
- The number of allotted seats for General Councilor is: 9.

=== Manglawar West ===
Manglawar West also known as Manglawar No.2 or Bami Khel is a Village Council. It is situated on West side of Manglawar. Manglawar West is inhabited by Bami Khel Pashtuns which is a sub tribe of Babuzai. Manglawar West also known as Bami Khel consisted of Esa Khel,Musa Khel, Burhan Khel, Mir Khel, Usman Khel, Langar Khel, Bibal Khel, Fateh Khan Khel, Dawlat Khel,Miangan, Mulan and other peoples.

Manglawar West consists of small mohallas (a bunch of houses in one place):

1. Mohalla Esa Khel (Pashto: محله عيسي خيل)

2. Ali Khan Khel (Pashto: علي خان خيل)

3. Fateh Khan Khel (Pashto: فتح خان خيل)

4. Bibal Khel (Pashto: بيبل خيل)

5. Rahat Abad (Gharib Abad) (Pashto: راحت آباد ، غريب آباد)

6. Kara (Pashto: کړه)

7. Kalkata (Pashto: کالکټه)

8. Zanagram (Pashto: زنګرام)

9. Miangan (Pashto: مياګان)

10. Garai Kalay (Pashto: ګړئ کلې)

11. Manglawar Pul (Pashto: منګلور پل)

12. Malak Nagar (Pashto: ملک نګر)

13. Dawlat Khel (Pashto: دولت خيل)

14. Tawheed Abad (Pashto: توحيد آباد)

15. Shaheed Abad (Pashto: شهيد آباد)

16. Gulshan Colony Maira (Pashto: ګلشن کالوني ميره)

17. Cheel (Pashto: چيل)

18. Mohalla Bakht Pur Khan (Pashto: محله بخت پور خان)

19. Bhatai (Pashto: بټئ)

20. Shakaray (Pashto: شکرې)

21. Shaldara (Pashto: شلدره

=== Local Bodies Election 2015 ===
Local Bodies Elections were held on May 29, 2015. Manglawar East and West have their own chairman and vice chairman.

Manglawar is a whole ward having its own local government, consisting of District Councilor and Tehsil Councilor. According to Election Commission of Pakistan the following are the Cabinet for five years:

S.No	Designation	Name
1	District Councilor Ward Manglawar	Sarwar Khan
2	Tehsil Councilor Ward Manglawar	Buneray Khan
3	Chairman VC Manglawar East	Hanifa Gul
4	Vice Chairman VC Manglawar East	Arshad Ali
5	Chairman VC Manglawar West	Iftikhar Khan
6	Vice Chairman VC Manglawar West	Barkat Ali

Before this Nazim (chairman) and Naib Nazim (Vice Chairman) in 2002 were Malak Bakhtmand Khan (Late) and Haji Bakhtiar Khan (Late).

== Population ==
In 2017-18 the population of Manglawar was estimated at 37,147.

== Education ==
=== Educational institutes ===
==== Government sector ====
Total number of government boys' schools in Manglawar are: 47 Details of which are given below:

S.No	Category of schools	Number
1	Govt primary schools (GPS)	39
2	Govt high schools (GHS)	3
3	Govt maktab schools (GMS)	1
4	Govt maktab primary schools (GMPS)	4
	Total number of government boys' schools	47

== Sports ==
Residents of Manglawar take a keen interest in sports. Local games include Parpatonay, Amprakakay, Tekaan (Belwori), Gwatai, Shengrii (Qoramban), Qat, Ludo, Ghal bacha, Peetogaram, Da Simano Elay, Chendakh, Parai, and Neenzaki. They also play football, cricket and badminton.

=== Manglawar Ground ===
Manglawar has its own ground on the West side of Manglawar near Sangota and Excelsior College Swat, opposite to Pakistan State Oil Fuel Station, and beside Miangul Abdul Haq Jahanzeb Kidney Hospital. In the playground, the youth of Manglawar plays after dawn time. The approximate Length of Manglawar Playground is 195 meters and width is 70 meters (9 Kanal, 17 Marley). There are football posts and goalposts. You can also play Cricket.

=== Football teams ===
Manglawar currently has a number of football teams, which take part in Village-based and Inter District. They are:

- Manglawar Eleven Football Club
- Prince Football club Manglawar
- Eleven star Manglawar
- Al sayed Salanda

Manglawar had very famous teams in past like Tofan Eleven and Brazil Eleven. Manglawar have some legends of footballers named Rahmat Ali ChaCha, Rahim Ali, Duraj Khan and Rokhan.

Manglawar also had junior teams, including

- United Manglawar
- Young Man Manglor
- Eagle star FC
- Young 11 Manglor
- Shaghai FC Manglawar
- Intezar FC

=== Cricket teams ===
Cricket teams are as follows:

- Manglawar Eleven Cricket Club
- Manglawar Titans
- Skylark Manglawar
- Hunter Cricket Club Manglawar
- Manglawar Gladiator cricket club
- Manglawar Lions

== Addresses ==
=== Post office ===
Manglawar Swat has BO (Branch Office) which works under GPO Saidu Sharif.

=== Postal Code ===
Postal Code of Manglawar shaldar is 19201. While postal code of Saidu Sharif GPO is 19200.

=== ZIP Code ===
ZIP code of Swat (Station: Saidu Sharif) is 19200. So Manglawar also has ZIP code 19200.

== Fame ==
Manglawar is famous for many things. Some of them are:

- Manglawar is famous for, as it is having the second biggest rock carved Buddha Statue (formally called as Budh Ghat) at Jahan Abad (Janabad) in Central Asia after Buddha of Bamiyan.
- Dwa Saro, the second highest mountain in Swat of approximately 10,000 feet from Sea level.
- Malka Swat, Queen of Swat, Shahida Bibi (Wife of Sultan Awais Swati ) who was also the Sister of Malak Ahmad Baba (Founder of Yusufzai in Swat) was from here, also now she is buried in Dherai Manglawar.
- Sultan Awais Swati (Sultan’was) the last emperor of Kingdom of Swat was from Manglawar, the remains of the castle are still observable. He was from Swati tribe whose descendants are now living in Mansehra.
- Sultan Pakhal Swati founded Kingdom of Swat with capital as Manglawar.
- It is said that Mubaraka Yusufzai, the wife of Babur, was from Manglawar.
- Manglawar, the ancient capital of Kingdom of Swat/ Pakhal Sarkar (Udyana or Swastu).
- Tourist attraction to Waterfall in Shingrai.
- Fishes, Manglawar has a river where best variety of fishes having a mouth-watering taste, hunters came from far flung areas to quench their desire with the piquant taste.
- Furniture and woodworking handicrafts work is also famous made for the locally produced wood from the jungles of Manglawar.
- Cement rocks which is in Shingrai.
- Manglawar is site for the best Rabab players, and loke singer of Pashto music.
- For Education, as compared to Swat, Manglawar has more than educated people from other places.
- Cobbler's make shoes, which are famous for their beauty.
- Pul Shopar (Gungri also known as a cocktail) is a food, people from far areas used to enjoy it mostly on Friday. etc.

== Former capital ==
Khan Roshan Khan Yousafzai- A famous Pashtun historian wrote about Sultan Pakhal on the page no 8 of his book Malika E Swat[1] that "At the time Yusufzai were exiled from Kabul, at that time Sultan Pakhil was the king of Swat. It is said that from Ashnagar to the top of Malakand and the whole of Swat including its territories and suburbs and the whole of Bunir was under the control of Sultan Pakhil. Sultan Pakhil himself lived in the fort of Mangalore. This fort, which was the base of the Sultanate of Swat, was very populated during the era of the Sultanate of Swat. Inside and outside there were colorful houses and strange havelis, tall palaces and primitive rivers flowing inside the fort. The bazaar was colorful and the shops were decorated. Outside the fort on the west side was the royal mausoleum which is still preserved."

== Hospitals ==
=== Miangul Abdul Haq Jahanzeb Kidney Hospital ===
Miangul Abdul Haq Jahanzeb Kidney Hospital [MJKH] is situated in Garai Kalay Manglawar Swat. It is a 110-bed hospital and was a Project of Punjab Hospitals Trust. It is spread over 32 Kanal (unit) at a cost of Rs. 800 million (US$2.9 million). According to officials, the hospital has 40-bed urology and 40-bed nephrology units that provide all sorts of services including free surgeries at three state-of-the-art operation theatres for renal diseases. They added that on average, 90 dialysis treatments were conducted at the facility which had also ICU and HDU to cope with seriously ill patients.

== Economy ==
=== Crops and fruits ===
The village climate is favorable for many crops and fruits. The village not only fulfills their own need but also supplies its product to other areas. Among these are Apricots (Pashto: خوبانئ), Palms, & Peach, Maize, Wheat, Rice (Pashto: شولې), Vegetables are more common.

== Insurgency ==
During the insurgency period of Swat, the People of Manglawar suffered from the Terrorism of extremists. But compared to other parts of Swat, Manglawar suffered less. Because of the less involvement of people in such instances. When the Pakistani military agreed on doing an operation against terrorism, the people of Manglawar migrated from their homes to Peshawar, Mardan, Swabi, Nowshera, etc. First, they migrated on 25 October 2007 during the Operation Rah-e-Haq, and then on 16 May 2009 during operation Operation Rah-e-Rast During these black days one of high-profile Miangul Asfandyar Amir Zeb was assassinated in Kass Manglawar on 28 December 2007 with six of his supporters including Malak Bakhtmand khan and Zahir Shah Khan.

== Miscellaneous ==
=== Babagan ===
Baz Dada (in Manglawar bazar), Mian Shah Rasool baba (in Manglawar ada), Mian Shekh baba (in Shakhorai) are spiritual people which are buried in Manglawar. There are many folk tales attached to them in local people. In Manglawar a brave women fighter is also graved named as Shaheeda Abai.

=== Bank ===
National Bank of Pakistan (Branch Code 231639 or 1639) is situated near Manglawar Pul.

=== Time zone ===
Time zone of Manglawar is Pakistan Standard Time: PST (UTC+5).

=== e-Sahulat ===
e-Sahulat (Branch Code: 61317) is situated in a Mall which is situated near Manglawar Pul / Bridge.

=== Shingrai Waterfall ===
Shingrai Waterfall
- Shingro Dand
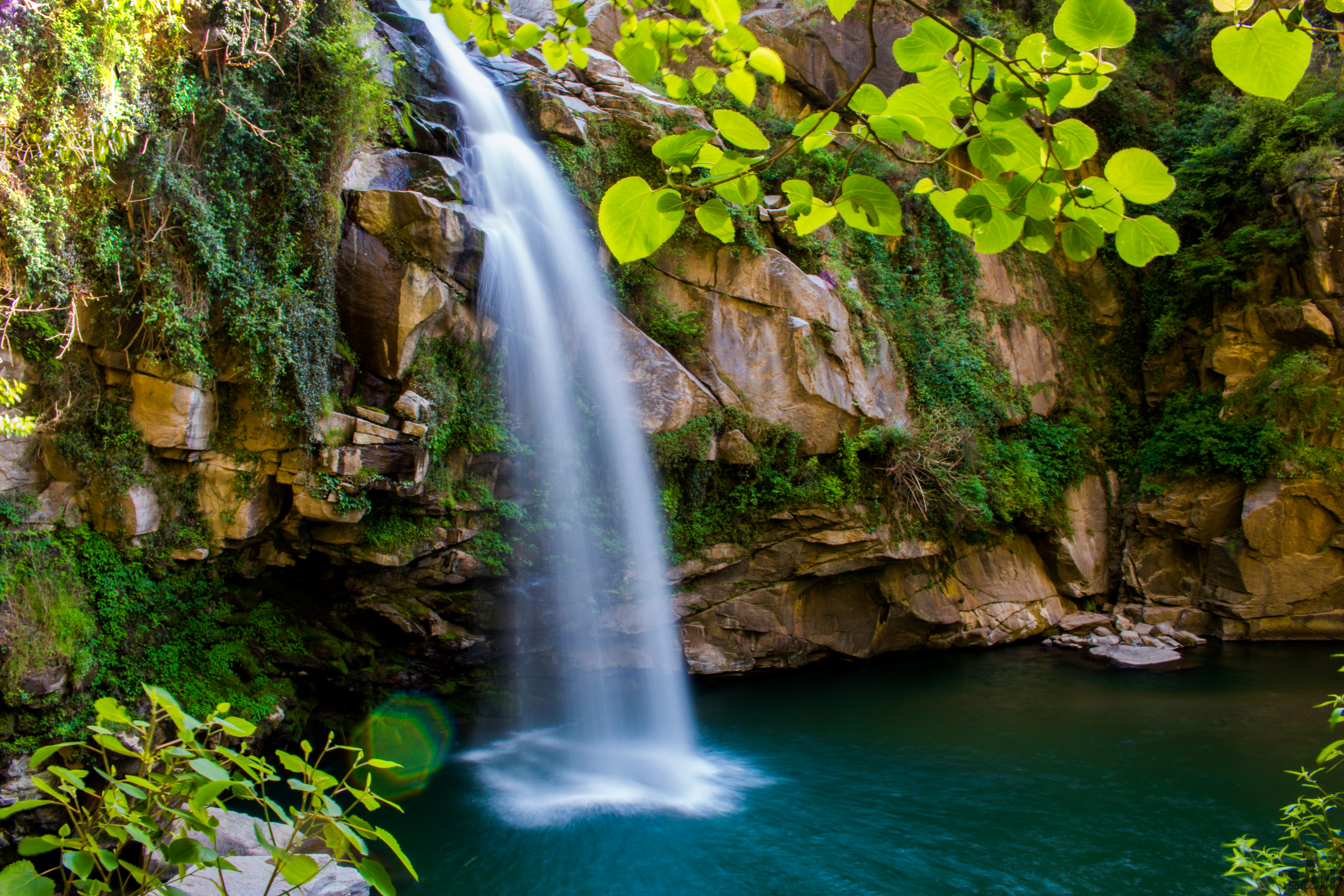
- Shingrai Waterfall in spring

- Location within Pakistan
- Location: Manglawar, Swat District, Khyber Pakhtunkhwa, Pakistan
- Coordinates: 34.79°N 72.47°E
- Type: Cascade
- Total height: 9 m (30 ft)
- Average width: 21 m (70 ft)

Shingrai Waterfall (often called: ShingroDand) is situated in Shingrai Manglawar, which is situated in Swat Valley, Khyber Pakhtunkhwa the province of Pakistan. It is located 9 kilometres (5.6 mi) from Manglawar and about 18 kilometres (11 mi) northeast of Mingora. Shingrai Waterfall is about 3,000 metres (10,000 ft) above sea level. It is 21 metres (70 ft) wide and about 9 metres (30 ft) in height.

== See also ==
- Buddhist Rock Carvings in Manglawar
- Muhammad Parvesh Shaheen
- Miangul Abdul Haq Jahanzeb Kidney Hospital
- Tehsil Babuzai
- Swat District
