= Miangul Abdul Haq Jahanzeb Kidney Hospital =

Geography
- Location: Manglawar, Khyber Pakhtunkhwa, Pakistan

Organisation
- Type: Specialist and teaching

Services
- Beds: 110

History
- Founded: December 2014 but not operational until 2016 due to loadshedding and low electricity voltage

Links
- Lists: Hospitals in Pakistan

Miangul Abdul Haq Jahanzeb Kidney Hospital (MJKH), formerly known as Nawaz Sharif Kidney Teaching Hospital, is situated in Manglawar, Swat. It is now named after Jahan Zeb of Swat, the second Wāli of Swat. It is a 110-bed hospital and was a Project of Punjab Hospitals Trust. It is spread over 32 Kanal (unit) at a cost of Rs. 800 million (US$2.9 million). According to officials, the hospital has 40-bed urology and 40-bed nephrology units that provide all sorts of services including free surgeries at three state-of-the-art operation theatres for renal diseases. They added that on average, 90 dialysis treatments were conducted at the facility which had also ICU and HDU to cope with seriously ill patients.

== History ==
To assist in the rebuilding of the war and flood-ravaged basic infrastructure of Swat, this hospital was built using funds from Punjab Hospitals' trust in Khyber Pakhtunkhwa. It is the first-ever Kidney Hospital in the province. The contract was awarded to M/S Tijaarat Developers.

Groundbreaking of the project was formally performed by Former Prime Minister of Pakistan Nawaz Sharif, and Ishaq Dar, the then leader of opposition in the Senate on 28 November 2012.

== Renaming ==
The hospital was renamed to Miangul Abdul Haq Jahanzeb Kidney Hospital by the Khyber Pakhtunkhwa government in 2021 despite protests by Nawaz Sharif's party members. Doctors at the hospital however had no issue with it being renamed. They said that it had been named after Nawaz Sharif because of his commitment to run it for at least three years.

According to the government officials in Peshawar, the decision to name the kidney centre after Nawaz Sharif was made in violation of rules of business of the Administration Department that national assets could not be named after a living person.

== Geography ==
It is situated in Garay Kalay Manglawar, which is 8 km away North-East side of Mingora; the main city of District Swat. The hospital is between a Pakistan State Oil (PSO) Fuel Station and Manglawar Pul (Bridge) a well-known place in Town Manglawar. It is to the left side of N-95 road.

== Building Structure ==
Covers an area of 96,330 square feet and has an Earth quake-resistant R-C-C Frame structure with reinforced brick masonry.

== See also ==
- List of hospitals in Pakistan
- Manglawar
- Buddhist Rock Carvings in Manglawar
- Tehsil Babuzai
- Swat District
