= Shore Kiosk =

The Shore Kiosk (Turkish: Yalı Köşkü) was a structure directly located at the banks of the Bosphorus, Istanbul, and served as a pleasure building for the Ottoman Padishah.

It was built in the sixteenth century. It was initially believed to have been constructed by Suleiman the Magnificent was later attributed to his father, Selim I. This single-story building featured a porch with numerous marble pillars that upheld a cornice, which was shaded by eaves.

== Literature ==
- Fanny Davis. Palace of Topkapi in Istanbul. 1970. ASIN B000NP64Z2
- Necipoğlu, Gülru (1991). Architecture, ceremonial, and power: The Topkapi Palace in the fifteenth and sixteenth centuries. Cambridge, Massachusetts: The MIT Press. pp. 336 pages. ISBN 0-262-14050-0.
