= Miangul Adnan Aurangzeb =

Pakistani politician (1960–2022)

Member of the National Assembly of Pakistan
- In office 1997–1999

Personal details
- Born: 11 January 1960 Saidu Sharif, Pakistan
- Died: 30 May 2022 (aged 62) Haripur, Pakistan
- Spouse: Zenab Gohar Ayub
- Relations: Miangul Hassan Aurangzeb (brother)
- Children: 3
- Parent: Miangul Aurangzeb (father)
- Education: Electrical engineering (BSc)
- Alma mater: Northeastern University

Miangul Adnan Aurangzeb (11 January 1960 – 30 May 2022) was a Pakistani engineer, and he was a member of Parliament MNA.

== Family ==
He was head of the former princely family which once ruled Swat princely state. He was the eldest son of Miangul Aurangzeb and the eldest grandson of Miangul Jahan Zeb (the last ruler). After the death of his father in 2014, he had become the unofficial Wāli of Swat. His maternal grandfather was the former President of Pakistan Ayub Khan.

== Education ==
He studied at the primary level within the Sangota Public School system in Sangota, Swat. He graduated on the secondary level from Aitchison College, an elite Pakistani secondary school. He was a professional electrical engineer who studied in the United States at Northeastern University in Boston, Massachusetts.

== Politics ==
He served in the National Assembly of Pakistan from 1997 to 1999.

== Engineering business ==
Miangul Adnan Aurangzeb was a consulting energy engineer for project management and government relations. Miangul Adnan Aurangzeb was a volunteer spokesperson for Project Miracles an initiative to recover and recycle plastic waste from the Indus Valley.

== Death ==
Miangul Adnan Aurangzeb died in a highway crash on 30 May 2022. He had attended a conference on archaeology at Hazara University in Mansehra and was driving home.

== Bibliography ==
- Miangul Adnan Aurangzeb, "Flashback, The Wali of Swat", The Express Tribune, 4 August 2014.
