= Syed Abdul Jabbar Shah =

Wali of the Swat State

Syed Abdul Jabbar Shah Tirmizi
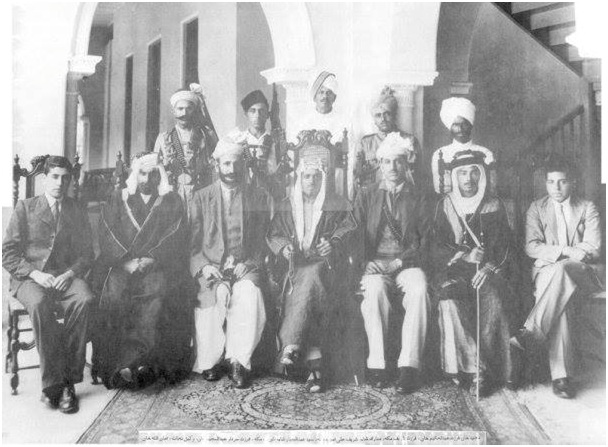
- Syed Abdul Jabbar Shah (third from the left)
- Successor: Wadud of Swat
- Born: Syed Abdul Jabbar Shah Tirmizi; Around 1870; Swat
- Died: Buner District
- Burial: Bacha Killay Buner District

Syed Abdul Jabbar Shah was the prime minister of State of Amb and later the monarch of Kingdom of Swat. He was a descendant of Syed Ali Tirmzi from Termez, Uzbekistan from the linage of Syed Baraka Tirmizi. Syed Baraka Tirmizi who was the Spiritual Teacher of Timur of Timurid Empire. He was living in Sethana, Palace of State of Amb he peacefully died in Sethana locally knows as Ghari, Sethana submerged under Tarbela Dam.

His elders migrations traced back with Tanoli Tribe historically refers as Timurid Descendants when they migrated from Uzbekistan to Afghanistan around 15-16th century and then in present day Tanawal.
