= Buddhist rock carving in Manglawar =

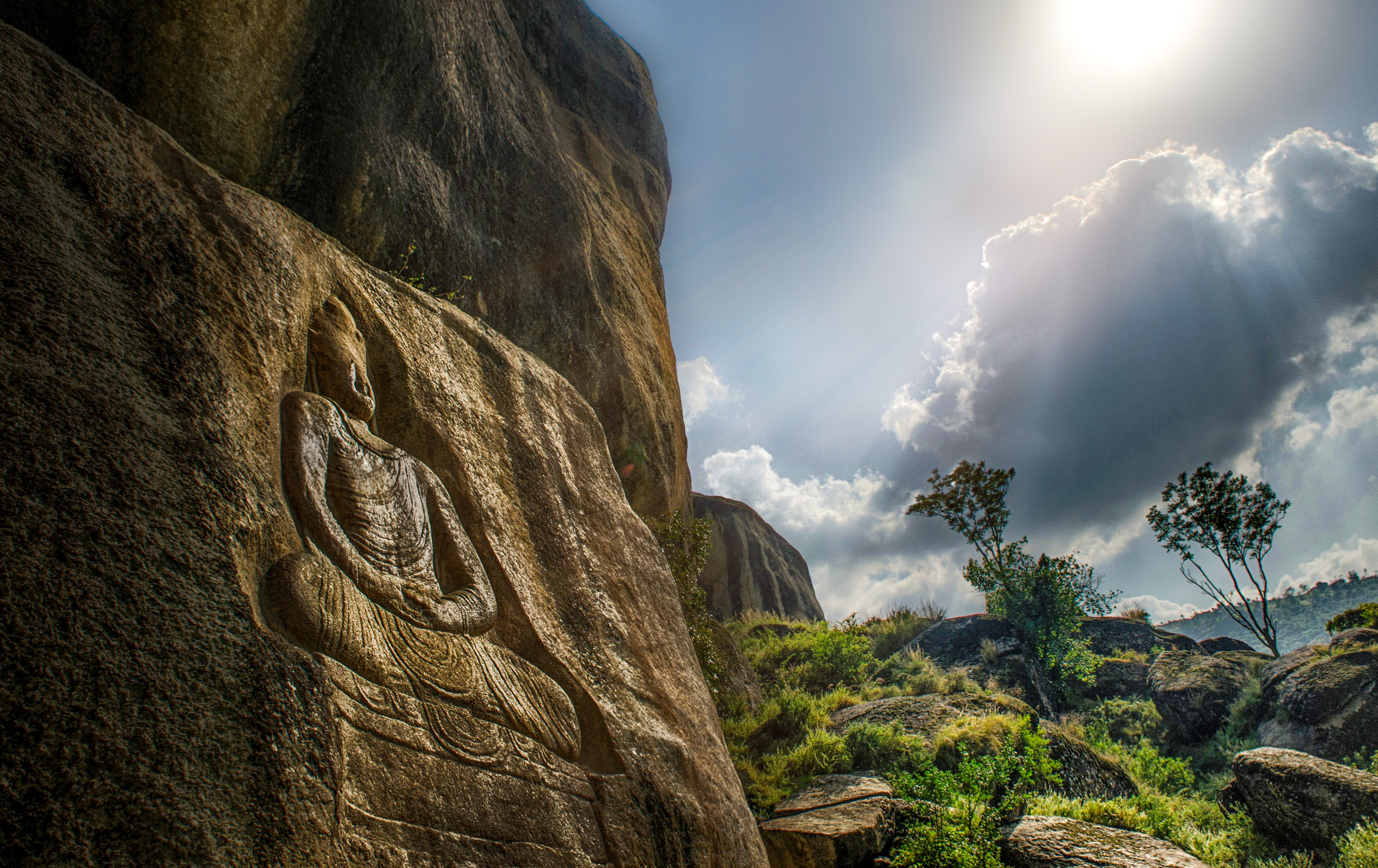
Shakhorai Buddha

Manglawar (or Manglor) valley in Pakistan is situated about 9 km to North East of Mingora, at the point where a number of side valleys descend from the watershed range to the east. The valley has a number of Buddhist reliefs and sculptures, the best known of which is the Shakhorai Buddha.

== The valley's archaeological importance ==
The Swat Valley contained a large number of monasteries, forming a sacred landscape where images, sculptures and inscriptions welcomed pilgrims as they entered the valley. Some scholars believe that the valley is the site of Oddiyana, a small medieval kingdom that played a crucial role in the development and dissemination of Vajrayana Buddhism, and the homeland of the sages Indrabhūti and Padmasambhava.

As one enters the sub-valley of Manglawar its importance is immediately revealed with the huge and well known rock relief of the Shakhorai Buddha. The importance of sub-valley Manglawar can be judged from the accounts of Aurel Stein, who writes:

Of all the Buddhist relieves found on the rock near Manglawar and miles up the valley the colossal image of a seated Buddha some thirteen feet in height is certainly the most striking. It is carved on the vertical face of a high reddish rock, high above the narrow terrace at its foot, and is a well-executed piece of work. This position, while it had saved the relievo from damage by pious vandals, has at the same time made it distinctly difficult to photograph. The hands of the true believers much often have itched as they saw this benign-faced heathen idol looking down towards Manglawar from its heights of some three hundred feet above Shakhorai hamlet.

This valley has much potential of Buddhist sacred areas, inscriptions and rock reliefs. Four areas were most of reliefs are concentrated have already been reported, among them are:

- Shaldara
- Kalkata
- Banjot
- Jahanabad
- Nangriyal

This valley has a great potential for archeological antiquities and shows a number of Buddhist sacred areas. Kharosti inscriptions and rock reliefs. However, more numerous are the new discoveries of rock carvings at Shaldara, Kalkata, Banjot, Taghwan and of Nangriyal locations.

== Shaldara ==
The Shaldara sub-valley, enclosed by the surrounding mountains, slowly descends towards the plan of Manglawar. The rock carving is situated on the right side of Shaldara Khwar. It is just below the Boy's Primary School while the Girls Primary School is on the northeast. Following are the details of the rock engravings.

=== Shaldara-i ===
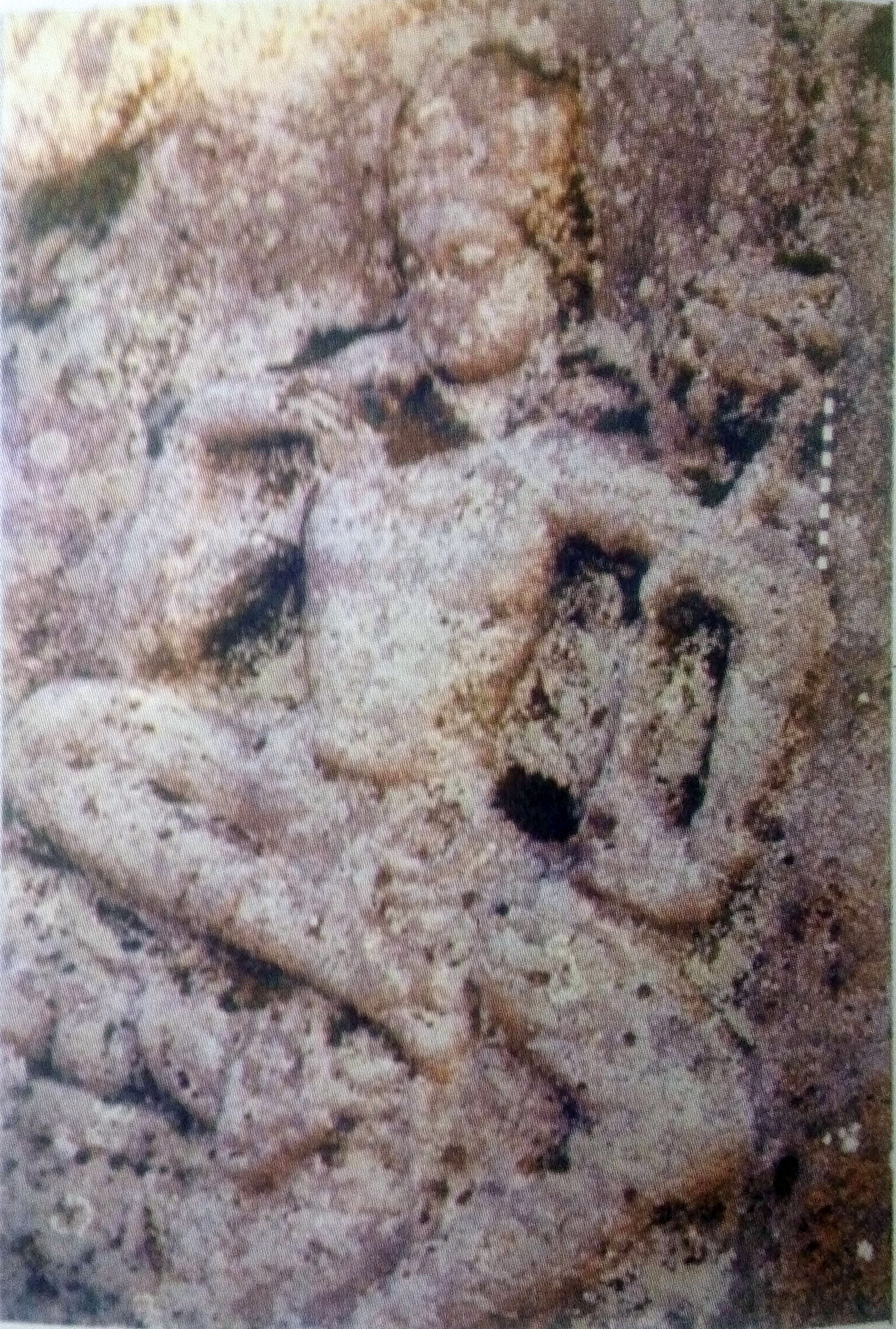
Shaldara -1 Stupa, Manglawar

Measurements of the boulder: 370 x 260 cm H. 185 x W. 100 x D. 12 cm Material: Amphibole mica schist Reference: Unpublished (REF) Orientation: Facing North Map ref. Topographic sheet. 43 B/5 (8744)

Shaldara-i depicts a well-preserved figure of Padmapani in lalitasana in pensive attitude on high asana. His right leg folded over the seat, while the left one hangs down. His right hand rests on the right thigh while the left one rests on the left thigh holding a lotus stem. The asana of the bodhisattva is quite prominent and its lower part is decorated by vertical bands of floral design. The bud of the lotus and its stem is intact. The clinging folds of his costume falling in his front, clearly visible over the seat. The head and face of the relief is chipping off, while a thick layer of patina on the rock has concealed many details.

== Kalkata ==
Kalkata (often spelled: Kalkatta or Kalkatai). The scattered houses of Kalkata hamlet are about 2 km to the south east of Manglawar. Four groups of rock carvings were found in locality of Kalkata. All these sites lie on the right side of the road leading to Banjot Village.

=== Kalkata-i ===
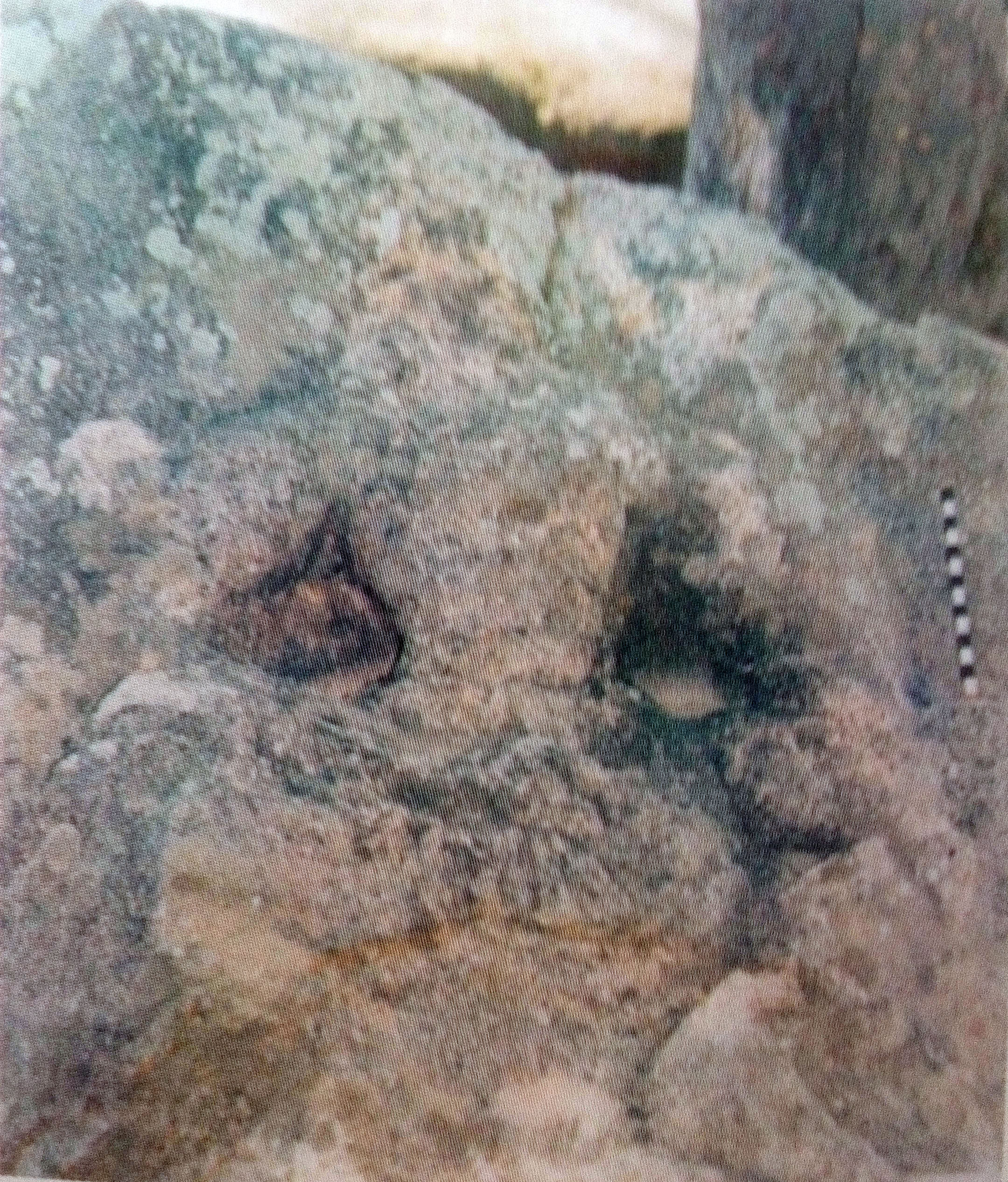
Kalkata -1 Stupa, Manglawar

Measurements of the boulder: 200 x 320 cm H. 94 x W. 96 x D. 06 cm Material: Granite gneiss Reference: Published Orientation: Facing East Map ref. Topographic sheet. 43 B/5 (8645)

This site is about five meters above the Boy's Primary School of Kalkata. This border is in situ and is covered by shrubs and thorny bushes. Deserted stupa remains can be seen on the southeast. Kalkata-1 rocks reveals a figure of Bodhisattva in lalitasana in pensive attitude on high asana. His right leg is folded over the seat, while the left leg hangs down. His right hand rests on the right thigh and the left hand on the left thigh holding a lotus stem. The lower part of the carving is intact while the upper portion is damaged. No details of dress and jewelry are visible due to thick layer of patina over the rock.

=== Kalkata-ii ===
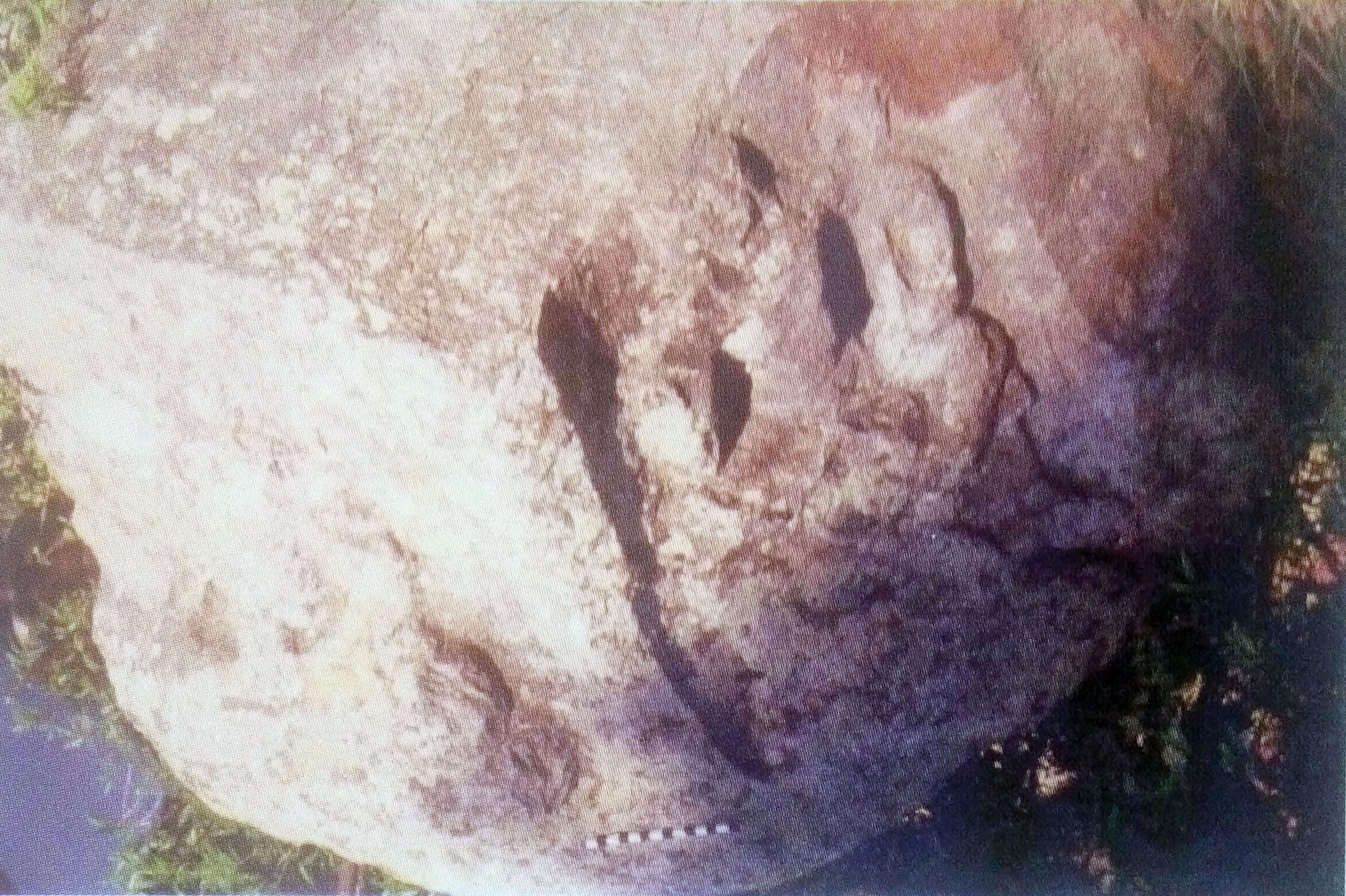
Kalkata -2 Stupa, Manglawar

Measurements of the boulder: 150 x 86 cm H. 86 x W. 80 x D. 07 cm Material: Granite gneiss Reference: Published Orientation: Facing open sky Map ref. Topographic sheet. 43 B/5 (8645) The location is similar to that of Kalkata-I. This square shaped stone block, dislodged from its original place, presently lies at the back of the Boy's Primary School of Kalkata. According to the local people it has rolled down from the upper hill terraces. The only visible portion if the rock reveals seated Padmapani on a high throne in lalitasana in pensive mood. His right hand rests on the right thigh, while the left one on the left thigh holding a lotus stem. The relief is damaged and chipped off at various places.

=== Kalkata-iii ===
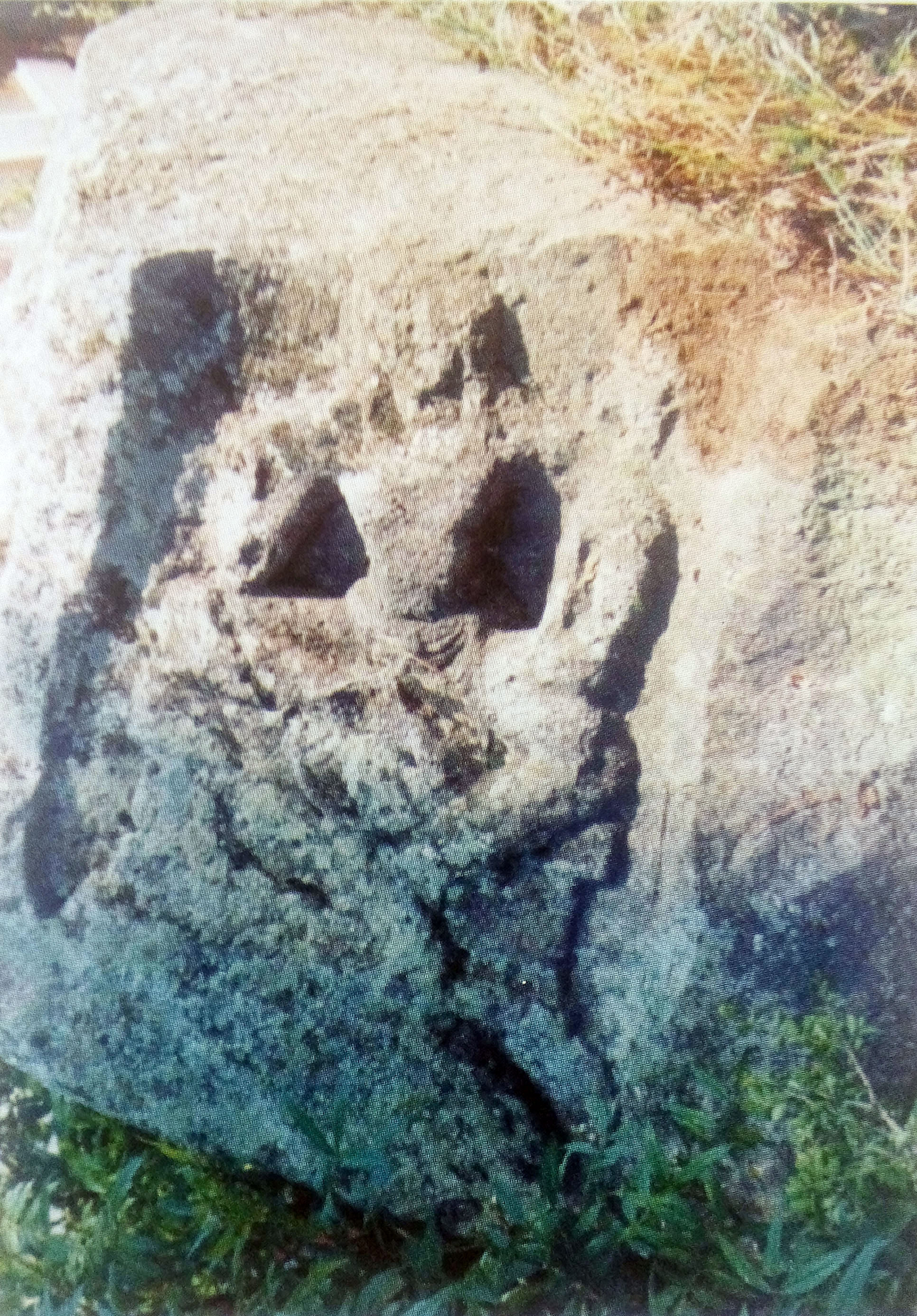
Kalkata -3 Stupa, Manglawar

Measurements of the boulder: 65 x 150 cm H. 60 x W. 120 x D. 13 cm Material: Granite gneiss Reference: Published Orientation: Facing open sky Map ref. Topographic sheet. 43 B/5 (8645)

Kalkata-iii is square block of stone shows reliefs on its three sides. It lies just above Kalkata-ii and not in situ. Wild bushes and shrubs have thickly covered the rock all around. According to the local people it depicts on its three sides three different statues. Presently only two sides where carvings are visible revealing dhyani Buddha on the top and undefined Bodhisattva in lilatasana in pensive attitude on the west. His right hand rests on the right thigh, while the left one on the left thigh holding lotus stem. The carvings are in bad state of ation.
Heavy patina over the surface if the rock make most of details invisible.

=== Kalkata-iv ===
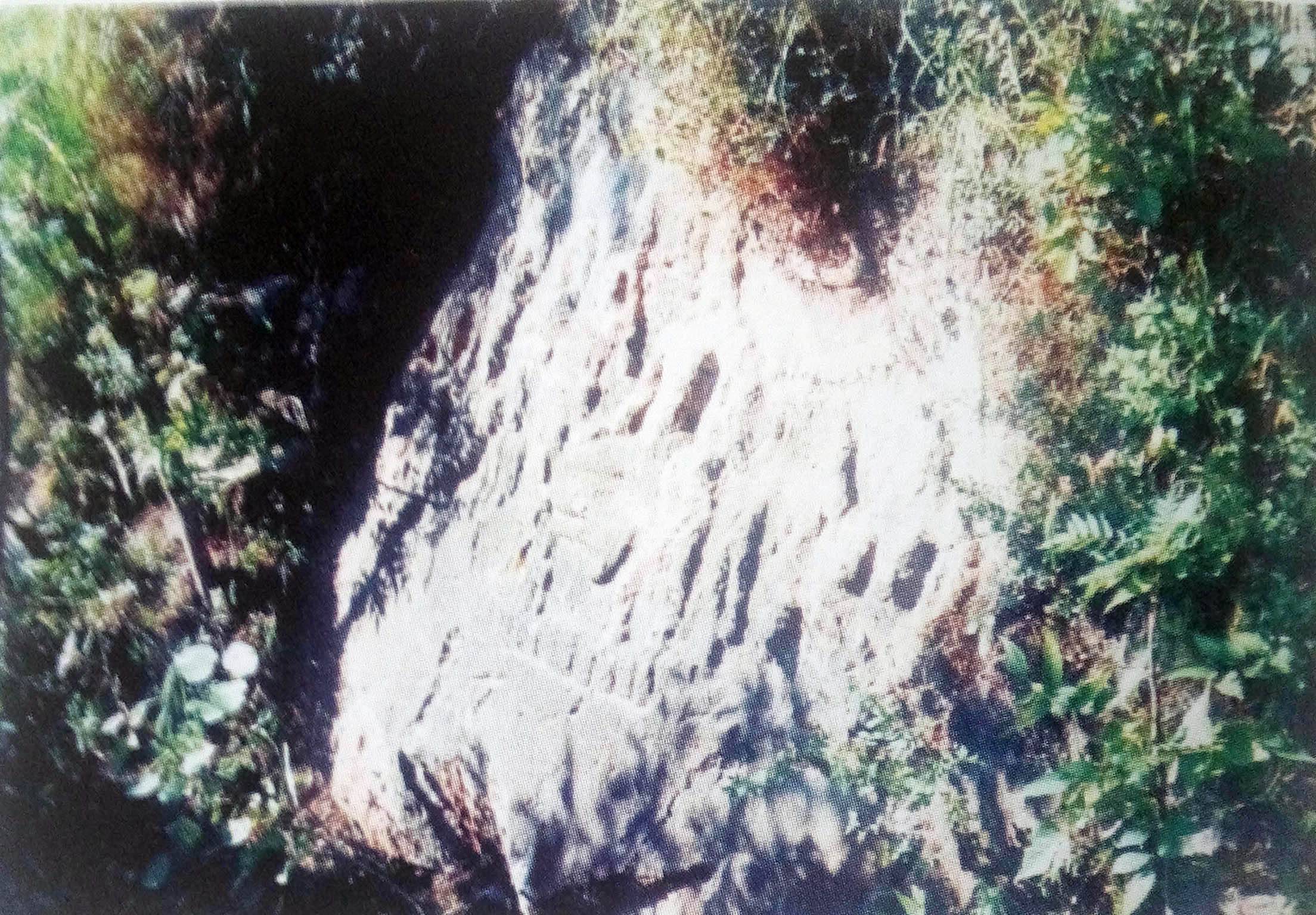
Kalkata -4 Stupa, Manglawar

Measurements of the boulder: 210 x 350 cm H. 115 x W. 255 x D. 09 cm Material: Quartz felsphetete Reference: Published Orientation: Facing East Map ref. Topographic sheet. 43 B/5 (8645)

Kalkata-iv is situated above half a km east of Kalkata-iii on the right side of the road leading to Banjot village. The rock reveals fifteen (thirteen human & two animal) figures all are in situ, but covered by trees and wild bushes. Most of the artistic details are faded and defaced. The extant remains shows two animals and thirteen human figures. Four are dhyani Buddhas of different sizes and five are Bodhisattvas in lalitasana in pensive attitudes. Two Bodhisattvas are on simhasana. Four among them are the states of standing figures in different attributes. All the reliefs are defaced and covered with a thick layer of white patina deposited by a water channel running above the rock that has obscured most of the details.

== Banjot ==
=== Banjot-i ===
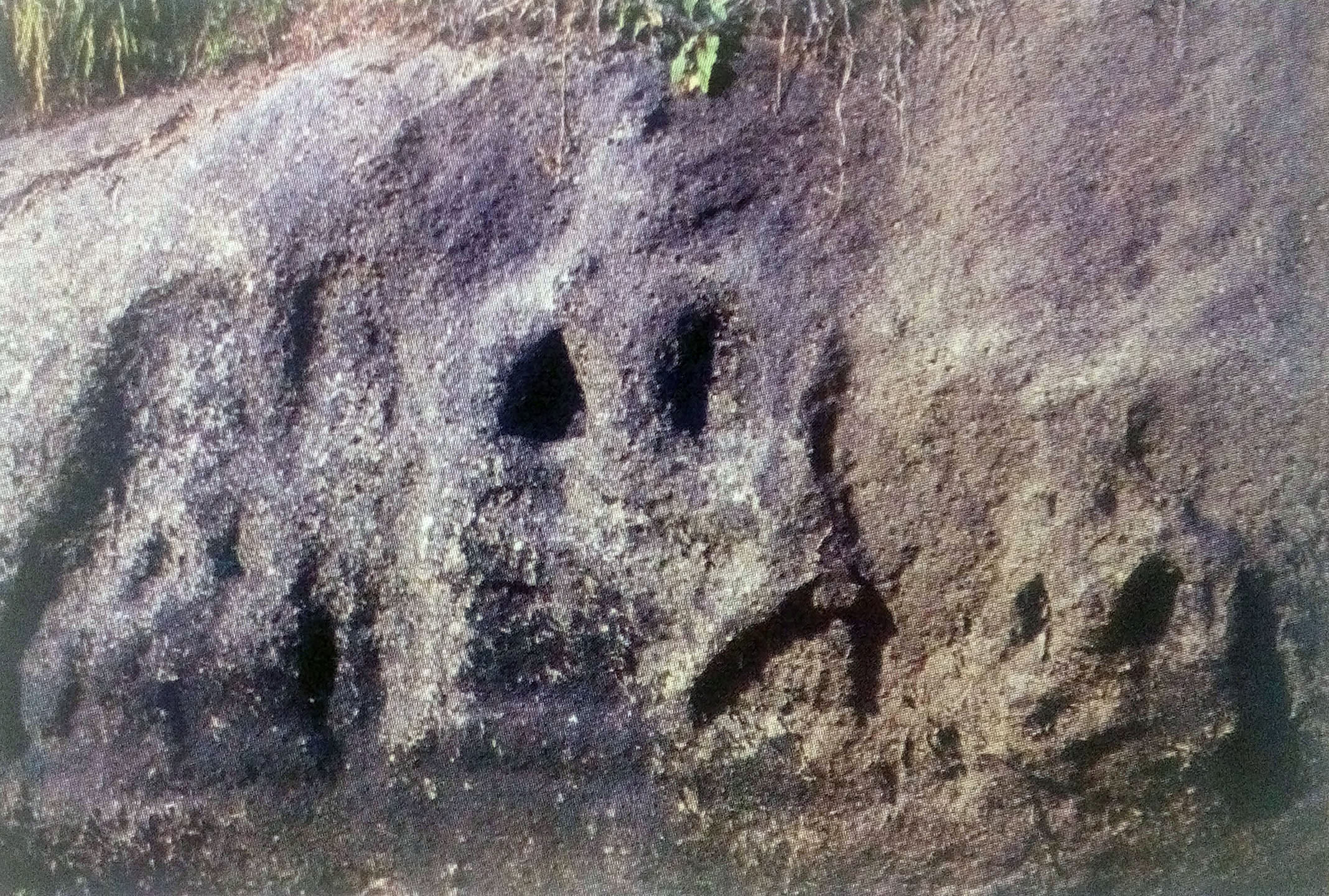
Banjot -1 Stupa, Manglawar

Measurements of the rock: Side-A: 180 x 560 cm, Side-B: 280 x 180 cm H. 110 x 260 x W. 150 x 80 x D. 7 x 12 cm Material: Quartz felsphetete Reference: Published Orientation of the relief: Side-A: Facing North Side-B: Facing West Map ref. Topographic sheet. 43 B/5 (8547)

The site of this group of rock reliefs is situated about 500 meters south of the present Banjot Bus Stand in the middle of cultivated fields. It is round shaped boulder, reveals relief in clockwise direction. Three exposed sides of the rock shows three diverse scenes. The southern side of the rock is buried in ground. The local to get the path widened has blasted the western side, once engraved. The extant remains on its two sides are divided in two groups – Side-A or northern side, and Side-B or eastern side. Starting from side-A, reveals three figures, the right one is standing Maitreya, holds a water flask in the left and lotus flower in right hand. On his right is seated Avalokiteśvara in lalitasana in pensive mood on a high asana. His right hand rests on his right, while the left one on the left thigh, holding a lotus flower. Another small unidefined figure on the right side of the seat. Side-B or the eastern side reveals three seated Bodhisattvas, the right one is relatively small figure of Padmapani in lalitasana in pensive mood. His right hand rests on his right, while the left one on the left thigh, holding a lotus flower. On his right is Avalokiteśvara in lalitasana in pensive mood on a high throne. His right hand rests on his right, while the left one on left thigh, holds a lotus flower. On his right is hand is a figure of Maitreya in lalitasana. A water flask in the right and lotus flower in the left hand. The constant water flow over the rock surface has faded most of the artistic detail illegible.

=== Banjot-ii ===
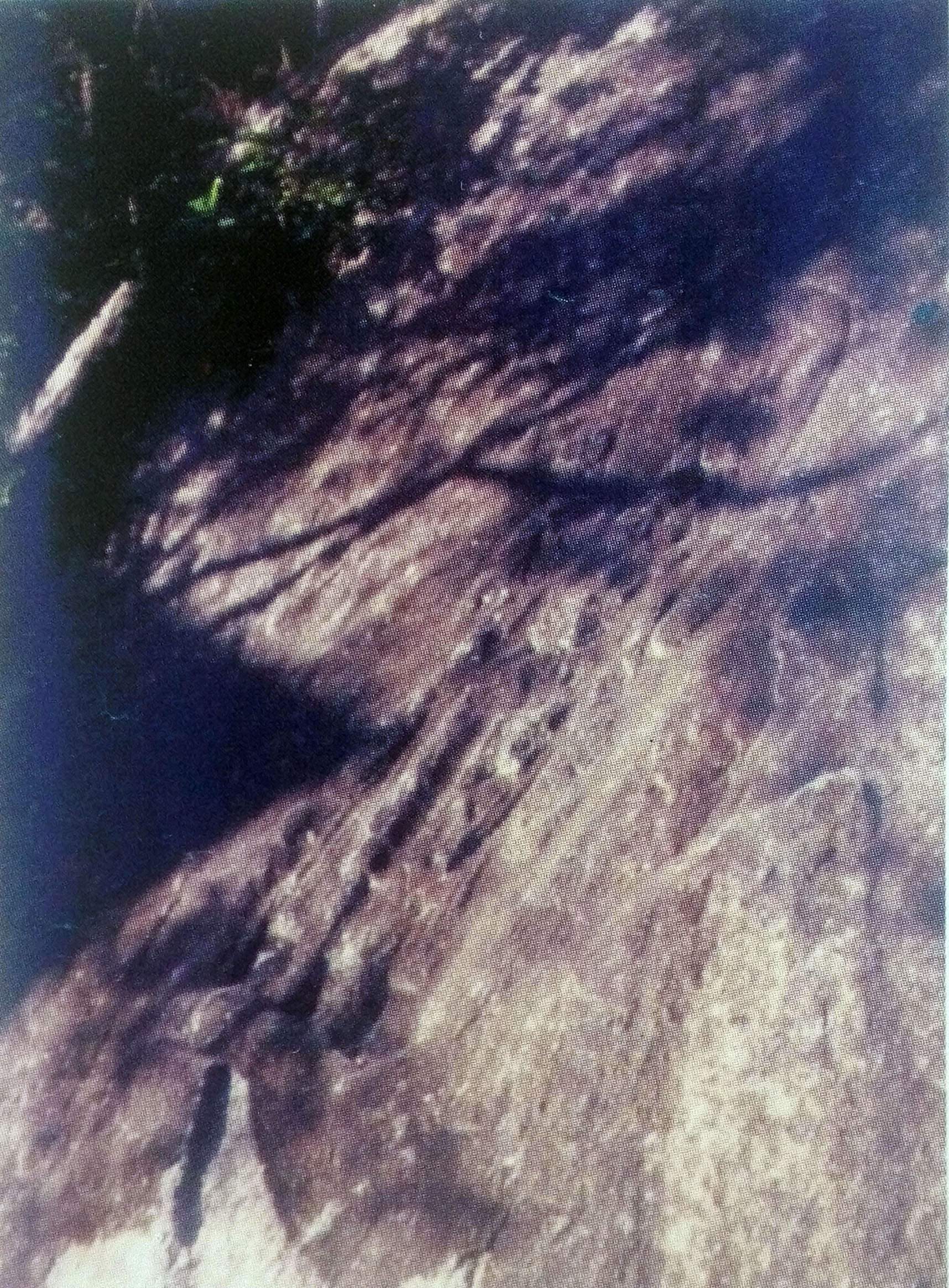
Banjot -2 Stupa, Manglawar

Measurements of the boulder: 800 x 470 cm H. 180 x W. 70 x D. 08 cm Material: Limestone Reference: Published Orientation: Facing South Map ref. Topographic sheet. 43 B/5 (8448) This rock is situated inside the old village of Banjot on right side of seasonal nalla (river), which split the hamlet of Banjot in the middle in to two parts. The rock reveals standing figure of Brahamnical god Siva having prominent prabhamandala behind his head. He wears a loose garment clinging down to the knee, and shows four hand- two on each side. The hands postures are as follows:

1. Lower right arm: hangs down, hand open showing the palm in front.
2. Upper right arm: raised, hold trisula
3. Lower left arm: hangs down, holds a handle pot.
4. Upper left arm: raised, holds an indistinct flat object.

The upper portion of the body is mostly chipped off, while the lower part of his pedestal is recently broken.

== Jahan Abad (Shakhorai) ==
The site is situated about five-km North East of present Manglawar village on the left bank of Sair Khwar (Sair River), while the old Shakhorai village (new Jahanabad) is on North-East of the site.

=== Jahan-Abad-i ===
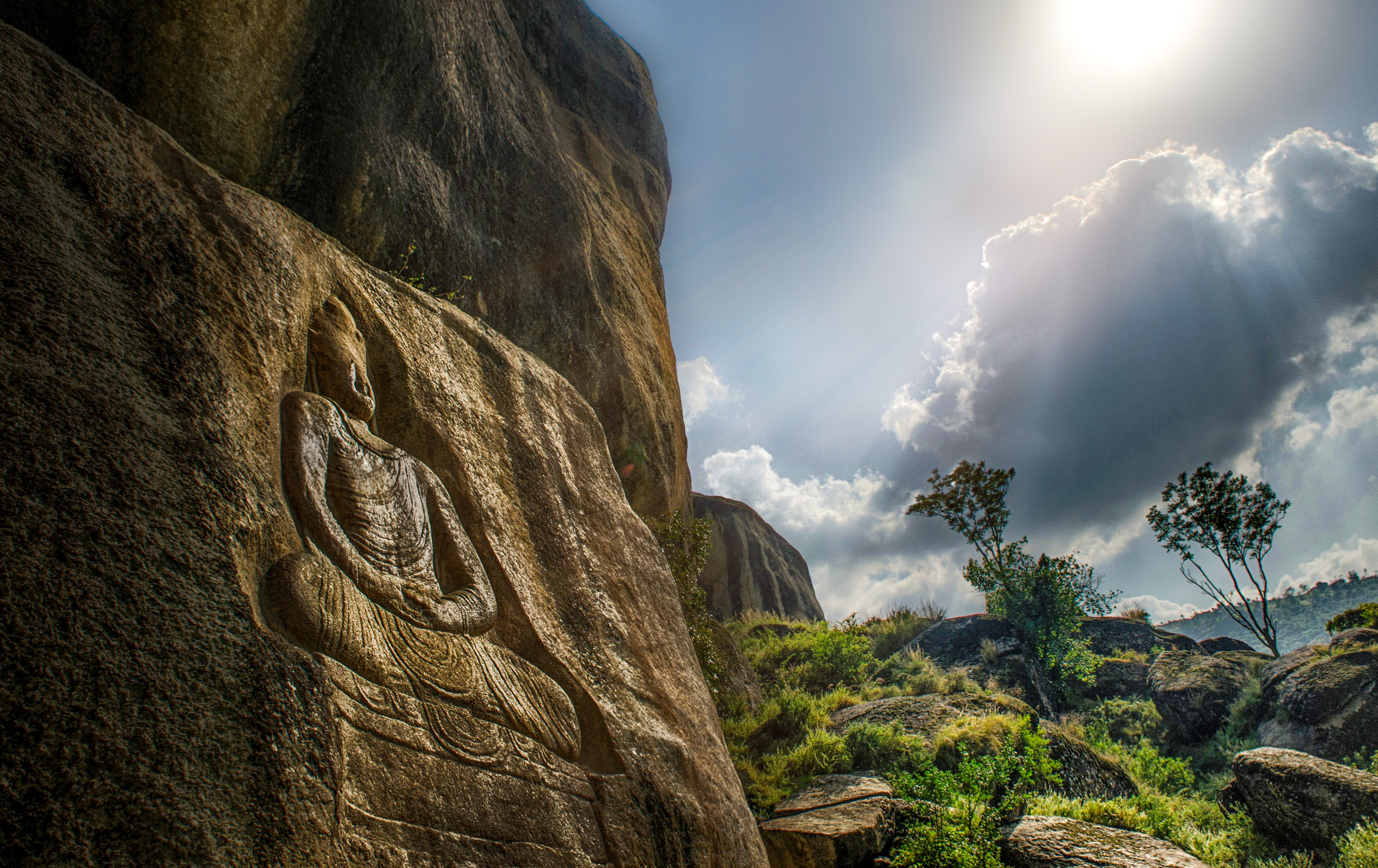
Jahan Abad -1 Stupa, Shakhorai Manglawar

Measurements of the boulder: 1180 x 2300 cm H. 700 x W. 500 x D. 11 cm Material: Reddish sandstone Reference: Published (See below note 1) Orientation: Facing North West Map ref. Topographic sheet. 43 B/5 (8947)

It was truly a holy place marked by a colossal rock image of Buddha, measuring 700 x 500 cm. While the asana is the Buddha is 120 x 390 cm. The rock reveals a colossal figure of Buddharupa in deep contemplation on a high asana. The Buddha is fully robed in drapery; the graceful clinging folds of which are visible on his seat.

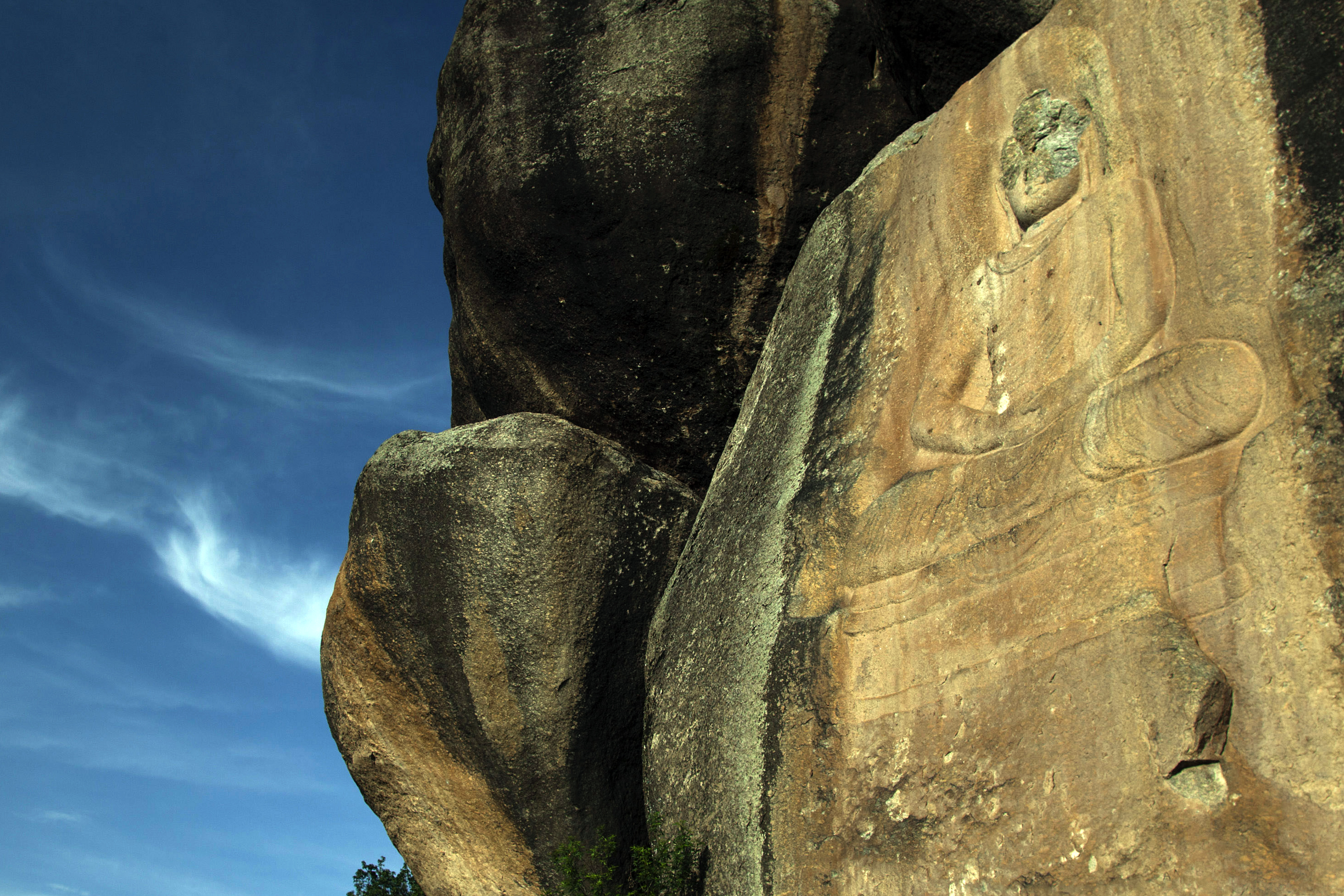
Jahan Abad Stupa -1 After destruction by extremists

Both of his hands rest in his lap covered by the folds of the drapery. He wears snail shell curly hairs with an Ushnisha (wisdom-bump). A prominent urna (beauty spot) and almond shape half-closed eyes. Apollo face with smiling continuance and long lobs of ears are clearly visible. It represents a most preserve piece of rock carving in the whole the Valley. In style and technique the relief carving may be compared to 7th - 8th century Tang sculpture in central Asia.

This Buddha seated statue is most famous because it is the second largest Buddha Statue (formally called as Budh Ghat) in central Asia.

In 2007 the Taliban tried to destroy the head of the relief with explosives, although ultimately only the top part of the Buddha's head was damaged. The carving has since been restored by the Italian Archaeological Mission in Swat. A coating was applied to protect the damaged part of the carving in 2012, and next the face was restored in 3D using laser surveys and old photographs. Finally, it was physically restored using parts of the original that had been picked up off the valley floor. The restoration was completed in October 2016, deliberately leaving some of the damage visible.

=== Jahan-Abad-ii ===
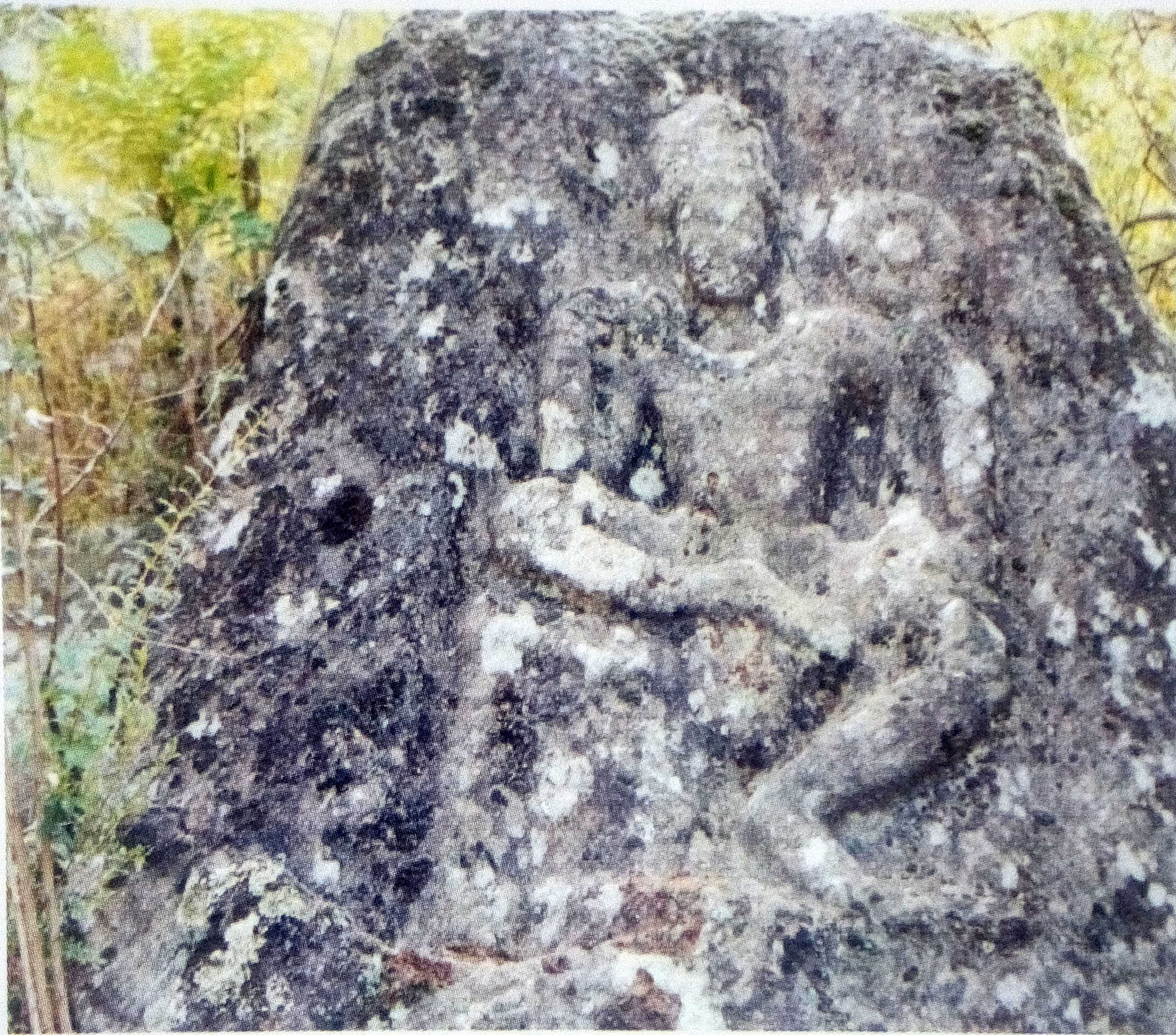
Jahan Abad -2 Stupa, Shakhorai Manglawar

Measurements of the boulder: 155 × 237 cm H. 153 × W. 110 × D. 09 cm Material: Limestone Reference: Published Orientation: Facing north Map ref. Topographic sheet. 43 B/5 (8948)

This rock relief is situated on the east of Jahan Abad-1, lies in the middle of orchard of apple. It reveals an Avalokiteśvara in lalitasana in pensive mood of a high seat. His right hand rests on his right, while his left one on his right, while his left one his thigh holding a lotus flower (full-blown). He wears a prominent head-dress and a necklace. The rock has thick layer of patina, which made much of the details illegible.

== See also ==
- Tharia Cave Paintings
- List of cultural heritage sites in Khyber Pakhtunkhwa
- Manglawar
- Muhammad Parvesh Shaheen
- Jahanabad Buddha
