= Battle of Chamla =

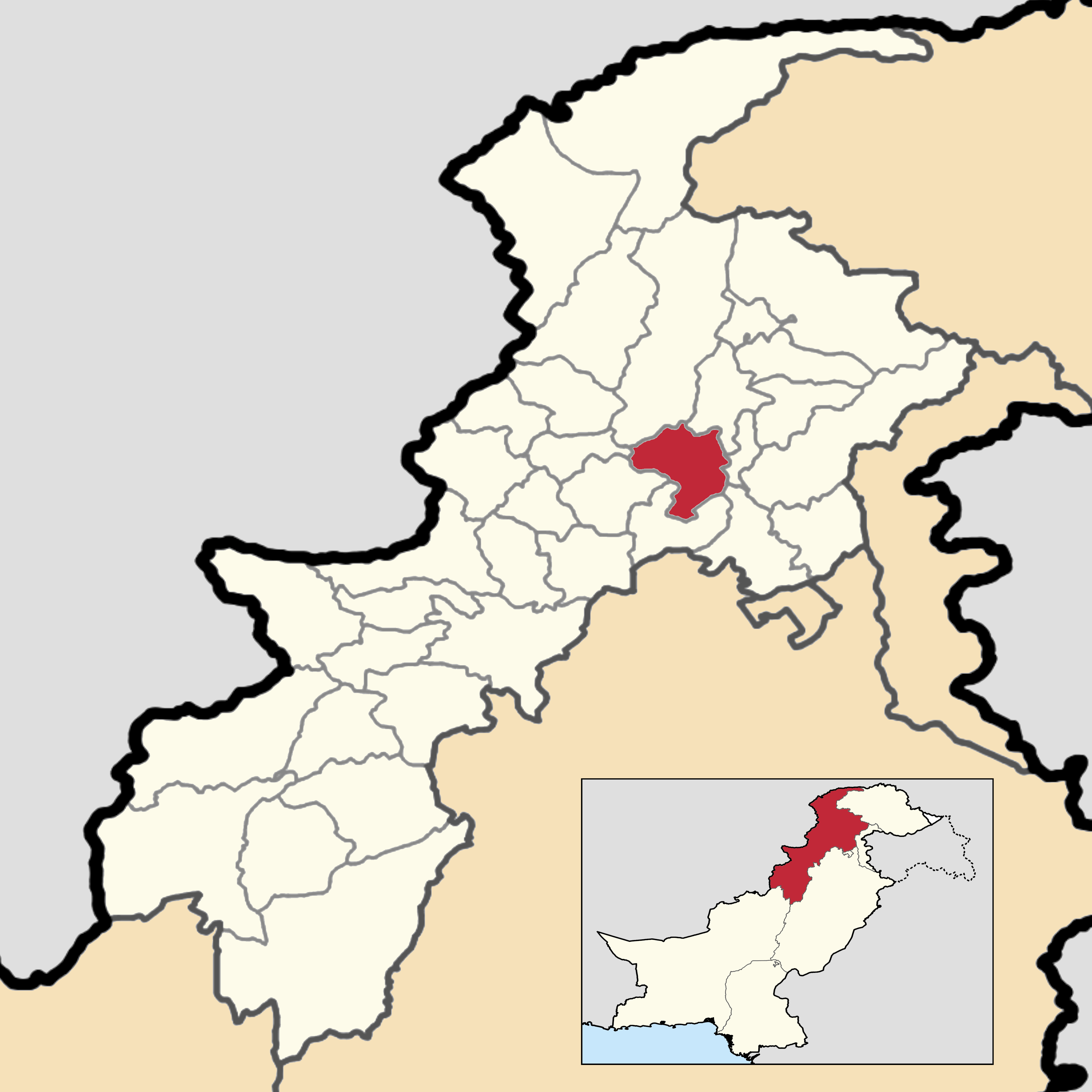
- Map of Buner " Highlight where war was fought"
Date	1919
Location	Buner District
Result	Kingdom of Amb victory
Territorial changes	Nawab of Amb established their own state

Belligerents
Nawab of Amb	State of Swat Supported by: Barakzai Dynasty

The Battle of Chamla was fought in 1919 in present-day Buner District of Swat, Pakistan between the forces of the Nawab of Amb (Khan I Zaman Khan Tanoli) and the Wāli of Swat. The conflict started over a border dispute. The rulers of Afghanistan were allies of Swat. The Army of Amb with howitzer artillery and guns, defeated the army of Swat. The State of Swat surrendered to Nawab of Amb and the ruler of Swat was captured.
