= Miangul Aurangzeb =

Last wali ahad of former Swat State

Miangul Aurangzeb Crown prince of Swat State

19th Governor of Khyber Pakhtunkhwa
- In office 10 August 1999 – 24 October 1999
- Chief Minister: Mehtab Ahmed Abbasi
- Preceded by: Arif Bangash
- Succeeded by: Mohammad Shafiq

14th Governor of Balochistan
- In office 22 April 1997 – 17 August 1999
- Chief Minister: Akhtar Mengal; Jan Mohammad Jamali
- Preceded by: Imran Ullah Khan
- Succeeded by: Sayed Fazal Agha

Member of the National Assembly of Pakistan
- In office 1993–1997
- Constituency: N.A-21 Swat-1
- Majority: Pakistan Peoples Party (PPP)

Member of the National Assembly of Pakistan
- In office 1985–1988
- Constituency: N.A-21 Swat-1

Member of the National Assembly of Pakistan
- In office 1970–1977
- Constituency: N.A-21 Swat-1
- Majority: Pakistan Peoples Party (PPP)

Crown Prince (Wali Ahad) of Swat State
- In office 1966–1969
- Monarchs: Miangul Jahan Zeb, Wali of Swat (princely state)

Member of the West Pakistan Assembly
- In office 1962–1965

Member of the West Pakistan Assembly
- In office 1956–1958

Personal details
- Born: 28 May 1928 Saidu Sharif, Swat State, British India
- Died: 3 August 2014 (aged 86) Islamabad, ICT, Pakistan
- Resting place: Aqba, Saidu Sharif
- Party: Pakistan Muslim League
- Spouse: Begum Nasim Aurangzeb
- Relations: Miangul Jahan Zeb (father); Muhammad Ayub Khan (father–in-law)
- Children: Adnan Aurangzeb; Mahmud Aurangzeb; Hasan Aurangzeb; Asmat Aman-i-rum
- Parent: Miangul Jahan Zeb
- Education: Welham Boys' School; The Doon School, Dehradun; St. Stephen's College, Delhi
- Occupation: Politician statesman
- Profession: Crown Prince

Military service
- Allegiance: Pakistan
- Branch/service: Pakistan Army
- Years of service: 1948–1955
- Rank: Captain
- Unit: Frontier Force Regiment
- Commands: Aide de Camp

Miangul Aurangzeb (Urdu/Pashto: میاں گل اورنگزیب; 28 May 1928 – 3 August 2014) was the last Wali Ahad (Crown Prince) of the former Swat State, the son of the last Wali of Swat, Miangul Jahan Zeb, and the son-in-law of the former president of Pakistan, Muhammad Ayub Khan. He served in the National Assembly of Pakistan and as governor of Balochistan and subsequently as governor of the Khyber-Pakhtunkhwa.

== Early life ==
He was born on 28 May 1928 in Saidu Sharif in the house of Miangul Jahan Zeb (the wali of Swat). He received his initial schooling at Welham Boys' School and The Doon School in Dehradun. He then attended St. Stephen's College, Delhi.

== Army career ==
Following the independence of Pakistan, Aurangzeb enrolled at the Pakistan Military Academy, Kakul in 1948. He was commissioned into the Guides Cavalry (FF) of the Pakistan Armoured Corps.

During his service in the Pakistan Army, he passed the Junior Officer's Course, the Advanced Infantry Course (Quetta) and the Junior Officer Leadership and Weapons Course (Nowshera). His achievements led to his selection as ADC (aide de camp) to the Army Commander-in-Chief General Ayub Khan.

In 1955, he married the daughter of General Ayub Khan and thereafter quit the army service to enter into politics.

== Public life ==
Aurangzeb represented Swat State in the West Pakistan Assembly from 1956 to May 1958, when he was nominated to the National Assembly of Pakistan.

After the imposition of martial law in 1958, all legislative bodies were dissolved, and civilian rule did not return until 1962. Aurangzeb was nominated to the National Assembly in 1962, and renominated in 1965.

After the resignation of President Ayub Khan in 1969, the Government of Pakistan under President Yahya Khan took over the administration of all remaining princely states, including Swat.

In 1970 the first-ever one-man one-vote general elections were held in Pakistan, which marked a new chapter for the former ruling family of Swat. Aurangzeb was elected on a Muslim League platform, defeating a strong candidate of the National Awami Party.

He was re-elected in the March 1977 general elections as a Pakistan National Alliance candidate (anti-Bhutto) despite suspected widespread vote-rigging by the rival Pakistan Peoples Party candidate.

Due to his opposition to the government of Prime Minister Zulfikar Ali Bhutto, Aurangzeb supported the military government of General Muhammad Zia-ul-Haq, and from 1981 served as a member of the nominated Majlis i Shoora (Federal Council).

In March 1985 general elections were held on a non-party basis, and Aurangzeb was again elected to the National Assembly of Pakistan.

Following the tumultuous events of 1988, party-based democracy returned to Pakistan and general elections were once again held in November 1988. Aurangzeb, contesting on the Islami Jamhoori Ittehad platform, was defeated by his cousin and son-in-law Shahzada Aman i Room, the candidate of the Pakistan Peoples Party.

Again in October 1990, Aurangzeb, contesting as an independent candidate, faced defeat, this time at the hands of his former allies, the Islami Jamhoori Ittehad.

However, he bounced back in the October 1993 general elections to regain his seat, and continued to hold it in the February 1997 general elections.

In April 1997, Prime Minister Nawaz Sharif appointed him as Governor of Balochistan, and Aurangzeb resigned from the National Assembly. The subsequent by-election resulted in a victory for his son, engineer Miangul Adnan Aurangzeb.

In August 1999, Aurangzeb was appointed the Governor of Khyber-Pakhtunkhwa and served in that capacity until the military takeover by General Pervez Musharraf on 24 October 1999.

He did not contest the 2002 general elections and retired from electoral politics, passing the torch to the next generation of his family. He remained active until his death in the leadership of the Pakistan Muslim League Nawaz.

As a result of death threats from and loss of security in Swat to the Tehreek-e-Nafaz-e-Shariat-e-Mohammadi under Maulana Fazlullah in 2007, Aurangzeb spent an extended period of time at his house in Islamabad. With the return of stability in the area, Aurangzeb resumed living at the family compound in Saidu Sharif. Due to prolonged illness, he set aside himself from politics and spent rest of his life at home in Islamabad till his death on 3 August 2014. He is buried in his ancestral graveyard at Aqba, Saidu Sharif.

== See also ==
- Miangul Jahan Zeb
- Miangul Adnan Aurangzeb
- Miangul Hassan Aurangzeb
- Swat (princely state)

Political offices
Preceded by Amir-ul-Mulk Mengal	Governor of Balochistan; 1997–1999	Succeeded by Sayed Muhammad Fazal Agha
Preceded by Arif Bangash	Governor of Khyber-Pakhtunkhwa; 1999	Succeeded by Mohammad Shafiq
