= Wadud of Swat =

Miangul Abdul Wadud
- Wāli

Wali of Swat
- Reign: 1918–1949
- Predecessor: Syed Abdul Jabbar Shah
- Successor: Jahan Zeb of Swat
- Born: 1881; Saidu Sharif
- Died: October 1, 1971 (aged 89–90); Aqba, Saidu Sharif, Swat
- Issue: Miangul Jahan Zeb

Miangul Sir Abdul Wadud (Urdu: ميانگل عبد الودود) was the Wāli of Swat from 1926 until his abdication in 1949. A grandson of the Akhund of Swat, he was elected as ruler of Swat (princely state) by a loya jirga in November 1918 and was formally recognized as Wāli of Swat on 3 May 1926 by the British authorities. He ruled from 1918 to 1949, when he abdicated in favour of his eldest son, Miangul Jahan Zeb.

== Early life and struggle for power ==
Miangul Sir Abdul Wadud was born in the family of Saidu Sharif in 1881. He was the grandson of Saidu Baba from paternal and Aman ul-Mulk, Mehtar of Chitral from maternal side. He was educated privately. In 1915, when the tribes of upper Swat elected Syed Abdul Jabbar Shah as their ruler, he opposed the election and went into exile at Dalbar. Abdul Jabbar could not defend the territory in a counterattack on Nawab of Dir in 1916. Anarchy ensued. Abdul Wadud returned and took up arms against Abdul Jabbar in 1916. As a result, the Jirga of Swat decided to oust Abdul Jabbar and appointed Abdul Wadud to replace him in 1917. Abdul Wadud established his rule in Swat with the help of the Mandanr tribe, and annexed Buner and Chakesar to his dominion. By 1923, he controlled most of the Swat area.

== Wāli of Swat ==
Abdul Wadud was proclaimed the Wāli of Swat in 1926 with an annual allowance of 10,000 rupees from the government of India. He had three wives, eight daughters and four sons.

Though he was elected king and was locally known as "Bacha" or "Badshah", meaning "king," the British authorities only granted him the title of Wāli, which refers to a religious ruler. Abdul Wadud wanted the title of king but was denied by the British political authorities on the basis that no ruler in India was a king, and that only the King-Emperor in Britain had the right to be styled in such a manner. Abdul Wadud acceded to Pakistan in late 1947.

Abdul Wadud removed shades for Hindu pilgrims on Elum Ghar who believed it to be the location of Rām taḫt.

He abdicated in favour of his eldest son, Miangul Jahan Zeb, on 12 December 1949. Jahan Zeb ruled Swat until its merger with Pakistan in 1969.

== Honours and awards ==
- King George V Silver Jubilee Medal (1935)
- King George VI Coronation Medal (1937)
- Pakistan Medal (1948)

== Death ==
Abdul Wadud died at the Royal Palace, Aqba (now Iqra Academy), on 1 October 1971 and was buried there at the Badshah Sahib Mausoleum.

== See also ==
- Swat (princely state)
- Miangul Jahan Zeb
- Muslim Gurjars
