= Jahan Zeb of Swat =

Ruler of Swat

Miangul Abdul Haq Jahanzeb
- HPk, HQA, CIE

2nd Wali of Swat
- Reign: 12 December 1949 – 28 July 1969
- Predecessor: Wadud of Swat
- Successor: Miangul Aurangzeb (titular)
- Born: 5 June 1908; Saidu Sharif, The Yusafzai State of Swat, British India
- Died: 14 September 1987 (aged 79); Saidu Sharif, NWFP, now Khyber Pakhtunkhwa, Pakistan
- Issue: 4 sons and a daughter
- House: Miangul Dynasty
- Father: Wadud of Swat
- Religion: Islam

Miangul Jahan Zeb HPk, HQA, CIE (Urdu: مياں گل جہان زيب; 5 June 1908 – 14 September 1987), also known as Miangul Abdul-Haq Jahan Zeb, was the Wāli of Swat from 1949 to 1969, a princely state that is now part of Pakistan. He succeeded his father, Wadud of Swat. He is remembered for building schools, hospitals, and roads, but also for his absolute rule over the region, which ended in 1969. When Pakistan came into being, Wadud of Swat declared the accession of Swat State to Pakistan on 23 November 1947. Muhammad Ali Jinnah, the Governor-General of Pakistan, accepted the Instrument of Accession on 24 November 1947. Wadud of Swat announced his resignation in favor of his son Jehanzeb. Jahanzeb also worked to protect the landmarks of previous cultures.

== Early life and education ==
Jahan Zeb, born in Saidu Sharif on 5 June 1908. He was the eldest son of Miangul Abdul Wadud also known as Wadud of Swat. He was educated at the Islamia Collegiate School in Peshawar and at Islamia College, part of the University of Peshawar. He had four sons and one daughter. Miangul Aurang Zeb, Wāli Ahad of Swat, a former governor of Khyber Pakhtunkhwa and governor of Balochistan; Miangul Shahzada Alam Zeb, father of Miangul Akbar Zeb, the Pakistani high commissioner to Canada; Miangul Shahzada Amir Zeb, a member of the National Assembly of Pakistan in 1977, who also ruled Swat in the absence of his father; and Miangul Shahzada Ahmed Zeb.

== Political career ==
Jahan Zeb was appointed Wāli Ahad in 1933. His father, the Wāli of Swat, eventually abdicated in favour of him, the eldest son, whom he had carefully educated along modern lines and gradually trained to assume the full burdens of government. Jahan Zeb was enthroned as Wāli of Swat on 12 December 1949. In 1951, he was granted the title of Ghazi-e-Millat and a hereditary salute.

== System of administration ==
The role of the Wāli was that of a king and religious leader, chief minister and commander-in-chief, chief exchequer, and head qazi. He ensured that his government provided good administration and productive revenue collection; a judicial system that dispensed quick and free justice; a system of qala (forts) that lent security and protection to the people; and jobs, welfare, education, and health services. Rapid communication through roads, bridges, and telegraph and penal codes provided rule of law, and telephones and informers kept the Wāli apprised of developments. This was a unique system of administration.

== Patronage of education ==
Jahan Zeb surpassed other contemporary rulers in the field of education. Before his era, Swat did not have a modern education system. His father laid the foundations of the system, which Jahan Zeb rapidly developed. He founded a girls' high school in Saidu Sharif, the first female educational institution in Swat. Jahanzeb College for Men has the importance of Aligarh College in the entire Malakand division. He also established a missionary school for girls at Sangota.

== Patronage of archaeology ==
The Wali was keen to preserve the history of his principality and investigate its archaeology. In 1955 he invited the Italian Archaeological Mission in Swat to the valley under the leadership of the noted scholar Giuseppe Tucci. In 1958 he sponsored the building of the Swat Museum, which contains exceptionally fine examples of Gandharan art and artifacts.

== Honours and awards ==
- Hon. Major General, Pakistan Army (1955)
- Hon. LL.D. (University of Peshawar) (1965)
- Pakistan Independence Medal (1948)
- Hilal-i-Pakistan), 1961
- Great Leader (Hilal-e-Quaid-i-Azam) (1959)
- Hilal-i-Humayun 1st class of Iran
- GO of the Order of Merit of the Republic of Italy
- Companion of the Order of the Indian Empire (1946)
- King George V Silver Jubilee Medal, 1935
- 15-gun salute, 1958

== Death ==
Jahan Zeb died on 14 September 1987 in Saidu Sharif. His funeral was attended by Prime Minister Muhammad Khan Junejo of Pakistan and other high officials. He was buried in his ancestral graveyard in Saidu Sharif.

== See also ==
- Swat (princely state)
- Miangul Aurangzeb
- Miangul Abdul Haq Jahanzeb Kidney Hospital
