= Swat (princely state) =

Former princely state of British Raj and Pakistan

State of Swat
- 1915–1969
- Flag

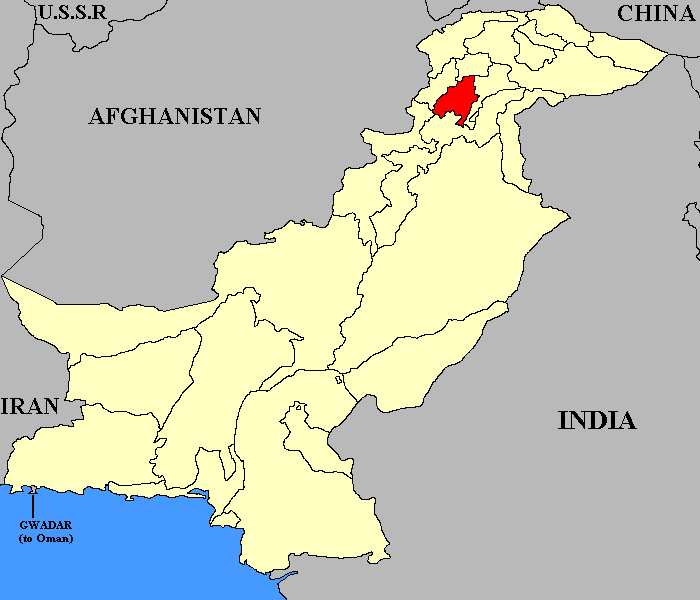
- Capital: Saidu Sharif
- Religion: Islam
- Government: Monarchy
- Ruler
  - 1915–1917: Syed Abdul Jabbar Shah
  - 1917–1949: Miangul Abdul Wadud
  - 1949–1969: Miangul Jahan Zeb
- History
  - Establishment: 1915
  - Accession to Pakistan: 3 November 1947
  - Merged into West Pakistan: 28 July 1969
  - Disestablished: 1969

Area
  - Total: 2,934 sq mi (7,600 km^{2})
- Currency: British Indian rupee, Pakistani rupee
- Today part of: Pakistan · Khyber Pakhtunkhwa

State of Swat (Urdu: رياستِ سوات) was a princely state that existed from 1915 to 1969 in the North-West Frontier Province. In 1947 the Wali of Swat acceded to the newly independent state of Pakistan. Swat continued to exist as an autonomous region until it was dissolved in 1969, and incorporated into West Pakistan (now Khyber Pakhtunkhwa Province).

The area it covered is now divided among the present-day districts of Upper Swat, Swat, Buner, Malakand, parts of Upper and Lower Dir districts, western parts of Indus Kohistan, and Shangla.

== History ==
The Swat Valley, known in ancient times as Oddiyana, was conquered by the Yousafzai Pashtuns in the early 16th century, coinciding with the conquest of Delhi Sultanate by Babur. Following the conquest and land distribution, the Yousafzai clans lived a tribal lifestyle, resisting Mughal and later Durrani attempts to expand their influence into Swat. They maintained their independence until the mid-19th century. After the expansion of the British East India Company following the Second Anglo-Sikh War into the neighbouring areas of Hazara, Buner and Mardan, the various tribes of Swat felt the need to elect their single leader. In 1849 Syed Akbar Shah, a religious leader descending from Pir Baba, was elected as the king of Swat. After his death the authority passed to Saidu Baba, another religious figure. The region fell into the earlier state of anarchy after Saidu Baba died in 1877.

The British established the Malakand Agency in 1895 consisting of Swat, Dir and Chitral, but did not interfere in the internal independence of the tribes. In 1915, Syed Abdul Jabbar Shah, another descendant of Pir Baba, was elected as the ruler but he was deposed only two years later and Miangul Abdul Wadud, the grandson of Saidu Baba, was elected by the tribal jirga. Abdul Wadud, better known by his title Bacha Sahib, proved to be a capable ruler and soon expanded his influence in all directions. He brought Yousafzai territories of Buner, Malakand, and parts of Dir under his control. In 1922–23 he conquered the Swat Kohistan, followed by the conquest of Indus Kohistan as far as the west bank of river Indus. After a fierce fighting his army defeated the Kohistanis of Besham and Kormung (present-day Shangla) in 1926, and Bacha Sahib settled Yousafzai tribes in Shangla. The quick expansion raised alarms among the British colonial authorities and they delimited the sphere of influence of Abdul Wadud, recognising Swat as a princely state and awarding him the title of Wali of Swat.

Upon Pakistan's independence in August 1947, Swat became a fully independent princely state until 3 November, when it acceded to Pakistan as one of the autonomous princely states of Pakistan, and the Wali continued to rule. The last Wali, Miangul Jahan Zeb continued to exercise absolute rule until Pakistan took control, when on 28 July 1969, Yahya Khan announced the full integration of Swat, Chitral, and Dir into Pakistan. The state of Swat was incorporated into the North-West Frontier Province of Pakistan. The title was made honorary after 1969 when the monarch was replaced by a civil administration. Today, the title is used unofficially as a courtesy title by heirs of the Miangul family.

== Legacy ==
Under the rule of Miangul Jehanzeb, who assumed the role of Wali in 1949, Swat experienced a remarkable growth in educational opportunities. He founded several schools and colleges, most notably Jehanzeb College in 1952. Education was offered at no cost, and scholarships were made available to students, resulting in a substantial rise in literacy rates.

Miangul Jahan Zeb implemented a judicial system that combined traditional practices with modern governance. A network of qazis (judges) was established to ensure swift justice. Law and order were maintained through a combination of local jirgas (councils) and state enforcement, leading to a significant reduction in crime.

Under the leadership of Miangul Jahan Zeb, Swat's economy experienced diversification, becoming recognized for its handicrafts such as woolen blankets (Sharai), shawls, rugs, and intricate embroidery. Additionally, marble and emerald mining played a significant role in boosting the local economy.

Miangul Abdul Wadud made investments in the preservation of culture and the development of architecture. The White Palace in Marghuzar, constructed in 1940, functioned as a summer retreat and stands as a symbol of the area's architectural legacy.

== Government ==
The rulers of Swat held the title Amir-e Shariyat and from 1918 were known as Badshah; the title changed to Wali in 1926.. Since 1969 the former princely state has been under a civil administration as part of Khyber Pakhtunkhwa.

State of Swat
No.	Name	Reign begin	Reign ended	Notes
4	Syed Abdul Jabbar Shah	April 1915	September 1917	Previously Prime Minister of Amb State, he was appointed as the leader of Swat by tribal elders in 1915.
5	Miangul Abdul Wadud	September 1917	12 December 1949	Grandson of Saidu Baba, he brought unity to Swat and was acknowledged by the British as the Wali (ruler) in 1926.
6	Miangul Jahan Zeb	12 December 1949	28 July 1969	He succeeded his father and advanced modernization initiatives with a significant emphasis on education, healthcare, infrastructure, and economic development. He willingly joined Pakistan, leading to Swat's incorporation into West Pakistan in 1969.
Titular Head
7	Miangul Aurangzeb	1969	3 August 2014	Held ceremonial title following the merger; held the position of governor in several provinces Balochistan and the North-West Frontier Province, which is now known as Khyber Pakhtunkhwa.
8	Miangul Adnan Aurangzeb	3 August 2014	30 May 2022	An engineer and former member of National Assembly of Pakistan from 1997–1999. He represented the Royal family at cultural and civic events before dying in a car accident in 2022.
9	Miangul Mahmood Aurangzeb	30 May 2022	–	Perpetuates the family's tradition of ceremonies and participation in local matters.

== See also ==
- Princely states of Pakistan
