= List of cultural heritage sites in Khyber Pakhtunkhwa =

Following is the list of monuments and archaeological sites in Khyber Pakhtunkhwa, Pakistan. A total 85 sites in the province were under the protection of the Federal Government. The list includes the only completely inscribed UNESCO World Heritage Site in Khyber Pakhtunkhwa, the Buddhist Ruins of Takht-i-Bahi and Neighbouring City Remains at Sahr-i-Bahlol as well as sites which are part of the World Heritage Sites at Taxila.

== Protected/Unprotected sites ==
Until the passing of the Eighteenth Amendment to the Constitution of Pakistan, the protected sites were under the Federal Government.

Inscribed UNESCO sites and Tentative UNESCO sites

ID	Name	Type	Location	District	Coordinates	Image
KPK-1	Zuro Dheri		archaeological site	Mansehra		Zuro Dheri More images Upload Photo
KPK-2	Akra (A) mound		near Village Bhart	Bannu		Akra (A) mound More images Upload Photo
KPK-3	Akra (B) mound		near Village Vhart	Bannu		Akra (B) mound More images Upload Photo
KPK-4	House of Dilip Kumar, Peshawar		Peshawar	Peshawar District		House of Dilip Kumar, Peshawar More images Upload Photo
KPK-5	Sheri Khan Tarakai		Village Jani Khel Wazir	Bannu		Upload Photo Upload Photo
KPK-6	Ghundai		Village Bakka - Khel Wazir	Bannu		Upload Photo Upload Photo
KPK-7	Ranigat		Totalai	Buner		Ranigat More images Upload Photo
KPK-8	Rehman Dheri		Hisam	D.I.Khan		Rehman Dheri More images Upload Photo
KPK-9	Northern Kafir Kot - ancient fort and temple		Umer Khel	D.I.Khan		Northern Kafir Kot - ancient fort and temple More images Upload Photo
KPK-10	Graveryard including four tombs at Lal Mohra Sharif		Lunda Pahar	D.I.Khan		Graveryard including four tombs at Lal Mohra Sharif More images Upload Photo
KPK-11	Southern Kafir Kot - ancient fort and temple		Bilot	D.I.Khan		Southern Kafir Kot - ancient fort and temple More images Upload Photo
KPK-12	Badalpur Buddhist stupa and monastery (Taxila)		Badalpur	Haripur	33°46′56″N 72°52′08″E	Badalpur Buddhist stupa and monastery (Taxila) More images Upload Photo
KPK-13	Lal Chak stupa and monastery (Taxila)		Garhian	Haripur	33°47′15″N 72°51′49″E	Upload Photo Upload Photo
KPK-14	Jaulian (Taxila)		Jaulian	Haripur	33°45′53″N 72°52′29″E	Jaulian (Taxila) More images Upload Photo
KPK-15	Sirsukh (Taxila)		Marchabad	Haripur	33°46′21″N 72°50′52″E	Sirsukh (Taxila) More images Upload Photo
KPK-16	Piplan site (Taxila)		Jaulian	Haripur	33°45′57″N 72°51′57″E	Piplan site (Taxila) More images Upload Photo
KPK-17	Bhamala Stupa site		Next to Haro River in Bhamala	Haripur		Bhamala Stupa site More images Upload Photo
KPK-18	Pind Ghakhran mound		Pind Ghakhran	Haripur		Pind Ghakhran mound More images Upload Photo
KPK-19	Mirpur mound		Mirpur village	Haripur		Mirpur mound More images Upload Photo
KPK-20	Bhera (mound)		Bhera	Haripur		Bhera (mound) More images Upload Photo
KPK-21	Chitti site		Chitti	Haripur		Upload Photo Upload Photo
KPK-22	Tarnawa-Chitti site A & B		Tarnawa (see above also)	Haripur		Upload Photo Upload Photo
KPK-23	Burj or Tuma site		Garamthun	Haripur		Upload Photo Upload Photo
KPK-24	Bhari Dheri		Kutehra	Haripur		Upload Photo Upload Photo
KPK-25	Dana Wali		Kutehra	Haripur		Upload Photo Upload Photo
KPK-26	Tope site		Kamalpur	Haripur		Upload Photo Upload Photo
KPK-27	Handyside Fort			Kohat		Handyside Fort More images Upload Photo
KPK-28	Tomb of Shaheed Ahmad Maujadid Baralvi		Bala Kot	Mansehra		Tomb of Shaheed Ahmad Maujadid Baralvi More images Upload Photo
KPK-29	Tomb of Shah Ismail Shaheed		Bala Kot	Mansehra		Tomb of Shah Ismail Shaheed More images Upload Photo
KPK-30	Buddhist inscribed rock at Shahdaur		Shahdaur Agror	Mansehra		Buddhist inscribed rock at Shahdaur More images Upload Photo
KPK-31	Mansehra Rock Edicts (Fourteen rock edicts of Asoka inscribed on three rock boulders)			Mansehra		Mansehra Rock Edicts (Fourteen rock edicts of Asoka inscribed on three rock boulders) More images Upload Photo
KPK-32	Seri Bahlol city remains		Seri Bahlol	Mardan		Seri Bahlol city remains More images Upload Photo
KPK-33	Fourteen rock edicts of Ashoka inscribed on two rocks in Shahbaz Garhi		Shahbaz Garhi	Mardan		Fourteen rock edicts of Ashoka inscribed on two rocks in Shahbaz Garhi More images Upload Photo
KPK-34	Takht-i-Bahi Buddhist ruins		Takht-i-Bahi	Mardan		Takht-i-Bahi Buddhist ruins More images Upload Photo
KPK-35	Buddhist ruins		Jamal Garhi	Mardan		Buddhist ruins More images Upload Photo
KPK-36	Stone circle		Asota - Swabi Tehsil	Swabi		Stone circle More images Upload Photo
KPK-37	Chanaka Dheri		Shahbaz Garhi	Mardan		Chanaka Dheri More images Upload Photo
KPK-38	Tereli Buddhist remains		Sawal Dhera	Marden		Upload Photo Upload Photo
KPK-39	Kasmir Samast		Rustam	Mardan		Kasmir Samast More images Upload Photo
KPK-40	Ruined fort wall		Hund	Mardan		Ruined fort wall More images Upload Photo
KPK-41	Maida Ghundai or Maida Dheri		Shahbaz Garhi	Mardan		Upload Photo Upload Photo
KPK-42	Hussai Dheri		Shahbaz Garhi	Mardan		Hussai Dheri More images Upload Photo
KPK-43	Adina Dheri		near Gariala	Mardan		Upload Photo Upload Photo
KPK-44	Chargul Dheri		Chargul - 5 miles southwest of Rustam	Mardan		Chargul Dheri More images Upload Photo
KPK-45	Chichar Dheri		Jamal Garhi	Mardan		Upload Photo Upload Photo
KPK-46	Turlandi Ghundai (mound)		Chak No. 2	Mardan		Turlandi Ghundai (mound) More images Upload Photo
KPK-47	Takhtaband		Tehsile Sawabi	Sawabi		Upload Photo Upload Photo
KPK-48	Black Rock		on right bank of Indus River - Modery	Nowshera		Upload Photo Upload Photo
KPK-49	Mirchi-ki-ddheri		Head Bust - Chak Razar	Peshawar		Upload Photo Upload Photo
KPK-50	Gorkhatree			Peshawar		Gorkhatree More images Upload Photo
KPK-51	Bala Hisar mound		Charsadda	Peshawar		Bala Hisar mound More images Upload Photo
KPK-52	Tomb built by one Shah Qutb during the reign of Mughal Emperor Akbar		Dilzak	Peshawar		Tomb built by one Shah Qutb during the reign of Mughal Emperor Akbar More images Upload Photo
KPK-53	Sheikhan Dheri		Chak Razar - Head Bust	Peshawar		Upload Photo Upload Photo
KPK-54	Rattappan mound		2 miles from Jalbi Village	Peshawar		Upload Photo Upload Photo
KPK-55	Ghaz Dheri		Razzar	Peshawar		Upload Photo Upload Photo
KPK-56	Hamza Garhi mounds		Hamza Garhi	Peshawar		Upload Photo Upload Photo
KPK-57	Dharam Sal-ki-dheri		Mera Prang	Peshawar		Upload Photo Upload Photo
KPK-58	Kaniza-ki-dheri		Charsadda	Peshawar		Upload Photo Upload Photo
KPK-59	Tomb and mosque of Sheikh Immamuddin		Pilosi Piran	Peshawar		Tomb and mosque of Sheikh Immamuddin More images Upload Photo
KPK-60	Gateway of Kotla Mohsin Khan		Kotala Moshin Khan	Peshawar		Upload Photo Upload Photo
KPK-61	Sethi House Complex		Mohallah - Setian	Peshawar		Sethi House Complex More images Upload Photo
KPK-62	Abasin Arts Council		Peshawar	Peshawar		Upload Photo Upload Photo
KPK-63	Barama site		Mingora	Swat		Barama site More images Upload Photo
KPK-64	Mahmud Ghaznavi Mosque (Odigram)		Odigram	Swat		Mahmud Ghaznavi Mosque (Odigram) More images Upload Photo
KPK-65	Butkara-I		Mingora	Swat		Butkara-I More images Upload Photo
KPK-66	Panr site		Panr	Swat		Panr site More images Upload Photo
KPK-67	Loebnr stupa		Loebanr	Swat		Loebnr stupa More images Upload Photo
KPK-68	Saidu stupa		Saidu Sharif	Swat		Saidu stupa More images Upload Photo
KPK-69	Dangram stupa		Dangram	Swat		Dangram stupa More images Upload Photo
KPK-70	Gogdara Rock Carvings		Gogdara	Swat		Gogdara Rock Carvings More images Upload Photo
KPK-71	Manglawar stupa		Manglawar	Swat		Manglawar stupa More images Upload Photo
KPK-72	Shinashah stupa		Batura	Swat		Shinashah stupa More images Upload Photo
KPK-73	Gullaki Dheri		Kukarai	Swat		Gullaki Dheri More images Upload Photo
KPK-74	Aligrama site		Aligrama	Swat		Aligrama site More images Upload Photo
KPK-75	Najigram site		Nijigram	Swat		Najigram site More images Upload Photo
KPK-76	Nawagai (Gumbatuna)		Nawagai	Swat		Nawagai (Gumbatuna) More images Upload Photo
KPK-77	Amlukdara stupa		Amlukdara Serai	Swat		Amlukdara stupa More images Upload Photo
KPK-78	Shingardara stupa		Amlukdara Serai	Swat		Shingardara stupa More images Upload Photo
KPK-79	Nimogram site		Village Gumkot	Swat		Nimogram site More images Upload Photo
KPK-80	Barikot Ghundai		ancient Bazira - Barikot	Swat		Barikot Ghundai More images Upload Photo
KPK-81	Ghalegay Cave		Barikot	Swat		Ghalegay Cave More images Upload Photo
KPK-82	Butkara-III		Gulkada Babozai	Swat		Butkara-III More images Upload Photo
KPK-83	Islamia College Peshawar			Peshawar		Islamia College Peshawar More images Upload Photo
KPK-84	the Fort of Nawab shah Jahan			Dir District		the Fort of Nawab shah Jahan More images Upload Photo
KPK-85	Kapoor Family House		Peshawar	Peshawar District		Kapoor Family House More images Upload Photo
KPK-86	House of Barri Imam		Banks of Hazro River	Abbottabad District		House of Barri Imam More images Upload Photo
KPK-87	Jinnan Wali Dheri		Haripur Khanpur Road	Haripur District		Jinnan Wali Dheri More images Upload Photo
KPK-88	Shahi Mosque, Chitral		Noghor Road	Chitral District		Shahi Mosque, Chitral More images Upload Photo
KPK-89	Syed ka Bagh		Dubgari Road	Peshawar	34°00′09″N 71°33′27″E	Syed ka Bagh More images Upload Photo
KPK-90	Grant Hostelm			Peshawar		Grant Hostelm More images Upload Photo

== Sites in what was previously FATA ==
National monuments

ID	Name	Type	Location	District	Coordinates	Image
FATA-1	Ali Masjid and Ali Masjid Fort	Fort	It is located at the narrowest point of Khyber Pass	Khyber Agency	34°01′27″N 71°15′52″E	Ali Masjid and Ali Masjid Fort More images Upload Photo
FATA-2	Bab-e-Khyber	Historical site	located in Jamrud on N-5 Highway	Khyber Agency	34°00′09″N 71°22′48″E	Bab-e-Khyber More images Upload Photo
FATA-3	Jamrud Fort	Fort	located next to Bab-e-Khyber in Jamrud	Khyber Agency	34°00′14″N 71°22′43″E	Jamrud Fort More images Upload Photo
FATA-4	Sphola Stupa (Khyber Stupa)	Archaeological site	Near the village of Zarai, 5 miles (8.0 km) before Landikotal beside the N-5 Highway	Khyber Agency	34°04′29″N 71°12′30″E	Sphola Stupa (Khyber Stupa) More images Upload Photo
FATA-5	Shagai Fort	Fort	Located 13 kilometres (8.1 mi) from Jamrud	Khyber Agency	34°01′02″N 71°16′48″E	Shagai Fort More images Upload Photo
FATA-7	Michni Post	Historical site	Between Landikotal and Torkham	Khyber Agency		Michni Post More images Upload Photo
FATA-8	Alexander Fort	Fort	Razmak	North Waziristan Agency		Alexander Fort More images Upload Photo
FATA-9	Malik Ammir Jani Mosque	Fort		North Waziristan Agency		Malik Ammir Jani Mosque More images Upload Photo
