= Handyside Fort =

Historical fort in Kohat, Khyber Pakhtunkhwa, Pakistan

Handyside Fort ہینڈِیسائِیڈ فورٹ
- Kohat Fort
- Kohat, Khyber Pakhtunkhwa in Pakistan

Site information
- Type: Fortress
- Owner: Pakistan Army
- Controlled by: IXth division
- Condition: In use

Location
- Coordinates: 33°35′28.49″N 71°26′15.4″E

Site history
- Built by: British Indian Army

Garrison information
- Current commander: Colonel Adnan

Handyside Fort (Urdu: ہینڈِیسائِیڈ فورٹ) is a historical fort located in Kohat, Khyber Pakhtunkhwa, which dates from the era of British colonial rule.

== Construction ==
The fort was built in the British colonial era by the British Indian Army. The fort is named after the Frontier Constabulary combatant, Eric Charles Handyside, who was killed fighting the rebels in 1926. Current commander is Colonel Adnan (as of June 2014).

== History ==
The fort was believed to have been built on the hilltop where Alexander the Great camped with his army before marching towards north. The fort now serves as the headquarters of the IXth division of the Pakistan Army.

== See also ==
- List of forts in Pakistan
- List of cultural heritage sites in Khyber Pakhtunkhwa
- List of cultural heritage sites in Pakistan
