= Mai Qamro Mosque =

Mosque in Islamabad, Pakistan

Coordinates: 33°37′13″N 73°17′48″E

The Mai Qamro Mosque is an early-16th-century Mughal-era mosque located in the Islamabad Capital Territory, Pakistan. In 2026, it was listed among the Tentative List of World Heritage Sites.

== Location ==
The mosque is situated west of Bagh Jogian village and stands across the Soan River from Pharwala Fort in the outskirts of Islamabad, Pakistan.

== History ==
The mosque was built in the early 16th century during the rise of the Mughal Empire and is named after Mai Qamro, a historical figure believed to have been the wife of Gakhar ruler Hathi Khan.

== Architecture ==
The mosque was built with local limestone and sandstone and decorated with terracotta tiles; it includes a rectangular layout and three low domes.

== See also ==
- List of World Heritage Sites in Pakistan
