= Mahmud Ghaznavi Mosque =

Former mosque in Swat, Pakistan

Coordinates: 34.7432°N 72.3142°E

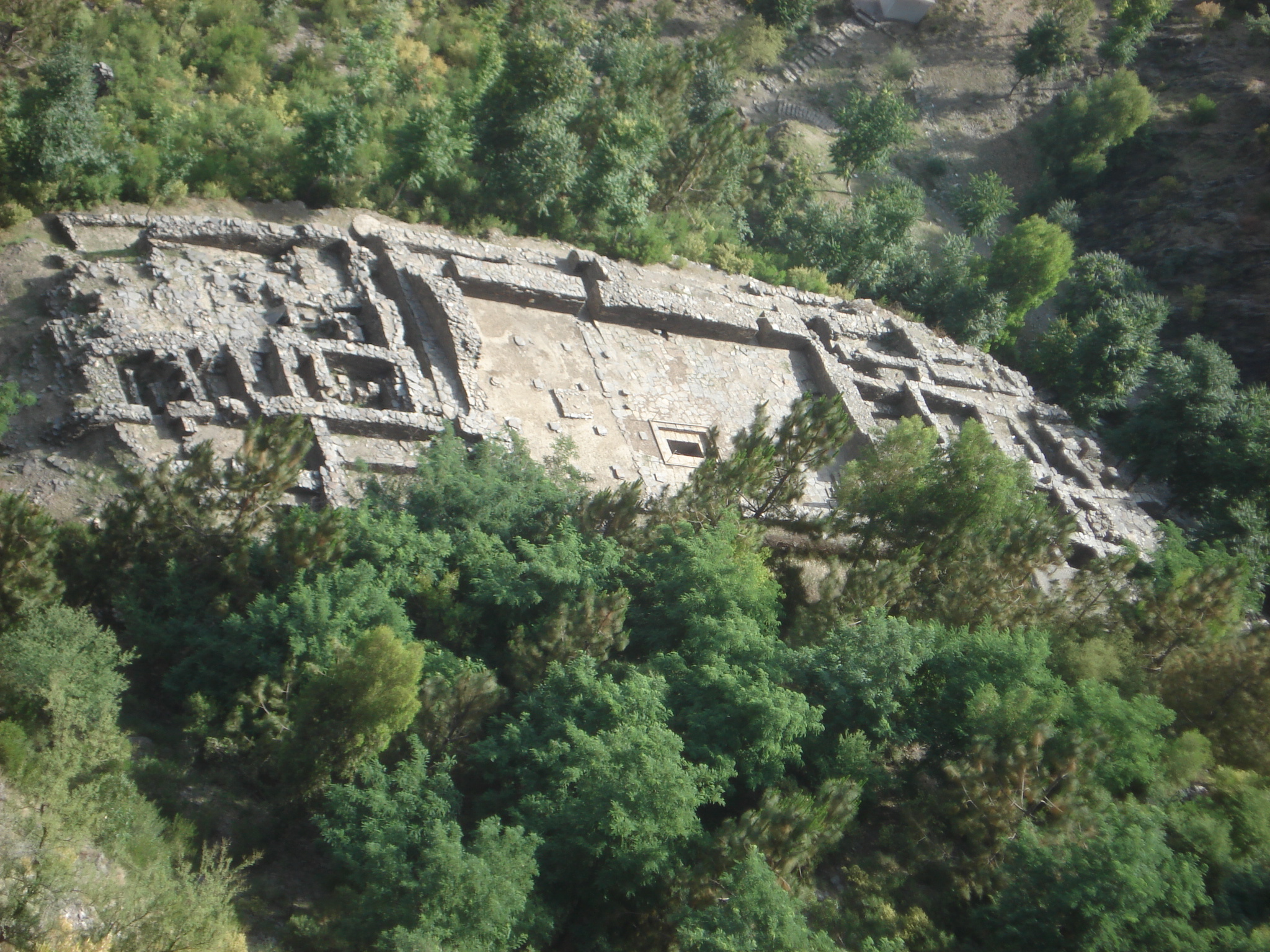
- Aerial view

Religion
- Affiliation: Islam

Location
- Country: Pakistan
- Interactive map of Mahmud Ghaznavi Mosque

Sultan Mahmud Ghaznavi Mosque is the oldest mosques in northern Pakistan, discovered by the Italian Archaeological Mission in Pakistan in 1985. The mosque represents a design of old Muslim architecture.

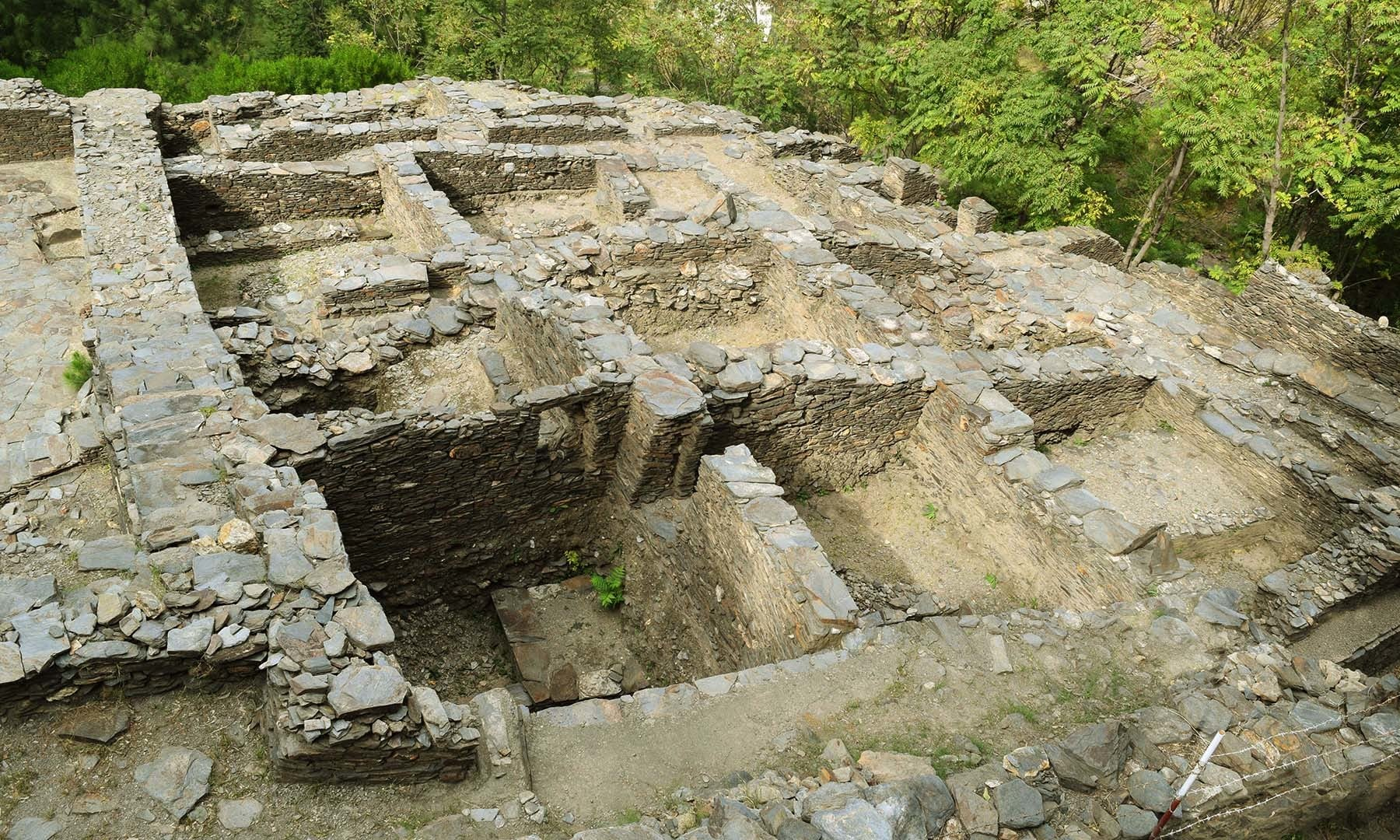
Mehmood Ghaznavi Masjid

== Discovery of an Arabic inscription ==
In 1984 an inscription in Arabic engraved on black marble was found by chance on the slopes of the hill below the castle of Raja Gira. The inscription attests to the foundation of a mosque in HE 440 (1048–49 CE) ordered by Amir Nustagin, a Ghaznavid General (known to history only through this inscription).

== Excavation of the site ==
The excavation carried out in the area between 1985 and 1999 brought to light a hypostyle mosque with supports originally in wood. The mosque occupies an early artificial terrace with remains of Gandharan masonry.

== Architectural style of the building ==
After uncovering the ruins, the most striking aspects were traces of 30-foot-high walls, a graveyard, common rooms, student rooms and a water mill. The walls also show traces of a Buddhist stupa that was constructed before the mosque was made.

The mosque follows the same basic pattern of mosque construction and is rectangular in plan, measuring 28m by 21m. It has high walls of schist stone laid in rough diaper masonry all around it. The roof is no longer in evidence but the stone bases of wooden pillars remain, numbering 5 running north to south and 8 running east to west. The mehrab is in the center of the west wall with an off center entrance to the east wall opposite this. The prayer chamber (of which the mehrab is a part) is a step higher and composed of a beaten earth floor. The remaining area is paved in schist stone slabs and corresponds to the courtyard area, having an ablution tank in the middle. To the north of the building is a series of three rooms or hujras called the "ziyada" which are all oblong in shape. The exterior of this side also contains three bastions or towers which both give the image of a Hindu Shahi style and also that of a Ribat. The mehrab is square, which marks it as a pre-Seljuk element.

== History ==
Unearthed on the slopes of Odigram mountain by the Italian Archaeological Mission, the mosque was originally called Raja Gira Mosque as it was situated in the vicinity of the Raja Gira Castle. It is not to be confused with Raja Griha in India.

The Mosque of Odigram dates back to the period of Mahmud or his grandson Maudud (1041–50 A.D.) and is therefore to be considered to be the earliest of Northern Pakistan. The people settled there around the tomb of a saint upon which a small and simple mausoleum was erected. In fact, it is the tomb of the General of Sultan Mahmud Ghaznavi named- Pir Khushal, who defeated Raja Gira and embraced martyrdom there. The tomb is popular in the people with the name of Ghazi Baba tomb. This historical mosque is a place for visitor attractions when people visit Swat in summer.

== See also ==
- Odigram
- List of cultural heritage sites in Khyber Pakhtunkhwa
- History of Malakand
- Buddhist Rock Carvings in Manglawar
