= Odigram =

- Union Council
- Location within Pakistan Location within Khyber Pakhtunkhwa
- Coordinates: 34.752°N 72.293°E
- Country: Pakistan
- Province: Khyber Pakhtunkhwa
- District: Swat

Population (2017)
  - Total: 57,666
- Time zone: UTC+5 (PST)

Odigram (also spelled Udigram or Hodigram; Pashto: اوډيګرام) is a settlement in the Swat Valley, in the Khyber Pakhtunkhwa province of northern Pakistan. It forms an administrative unit known as Union council or ward in Tehsil Babuzai, of Swat District.

Odigram is territorial ward, which is further divided in three village councils:

1. Balogram (Village Council)
2. Odigram No. 1 (Village Council)
3. Odigram No. 2 (Village Council)

Odigram is the site of the Mahmud Ghaznavi Mosque, one of the oldest in Pakistan.
