= Bhamala Stupa =

Ruined Buddhist stupa near Haripur, Pakistan

Bhamala Stupa بهامالا اسٹوپ
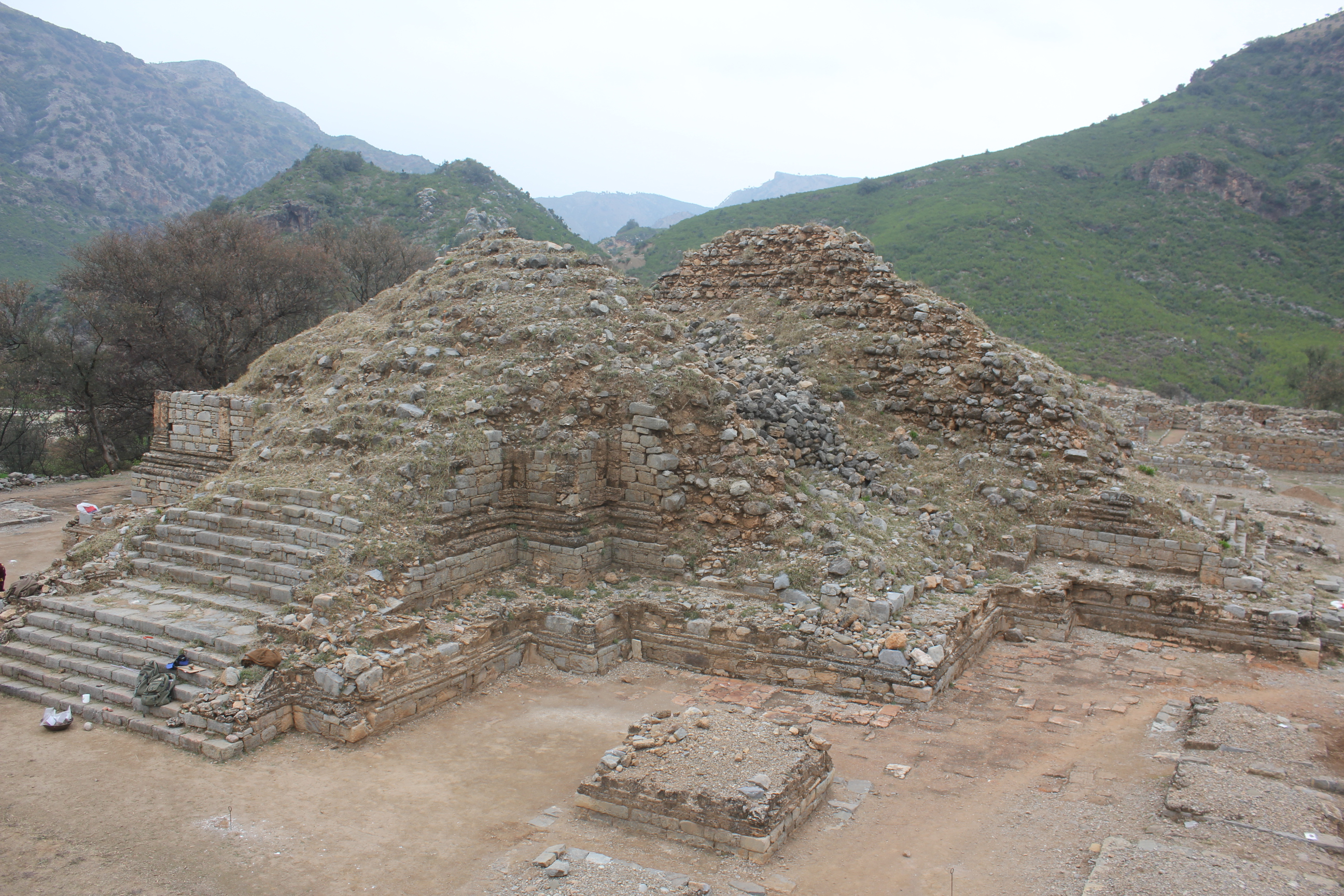
- View of the ruins of the cruciform stupa

- Location within Pakistan

Religion
- Affiliation: Buddhism
- Year consecrated: 2nd century CE

Location
- Location: Haripur, Khyber Pakhtunkhwa, Pakistan
- Interactive map of Bhamala Stupa بهامالا اسٹوپ
- Coordinates: 33°50′N 72°58′E

Bhamala Stupa (Urdu: بهامالا اسٹوپ) is a ruined Buddhist stupa near Haripur, Pakistan, that dates to the 2nd century CE. It is located on the banks of the Haro River, near Khanpur Dam, and is a tourist destination. Bhamala stupa is part of the larger Bhamala Buddhist Complex. The site is known for its 1,700-year-old statue of the Buddha attaining enlightenment—considered to be the oldest such statue in the world.

== Excavation ==
Dating to the 2nd–5th century CE, the site was first excavated by John Marshall in 1929, and work continued until the early 1930s; excavations resumed in 2017. As of June 2015, the site is under the oversight of the Department of Archaeology and Museums of the government of Khyber Pakhtunkhwa. It is believed to be one of the best preserved sites in the Taxila valley.

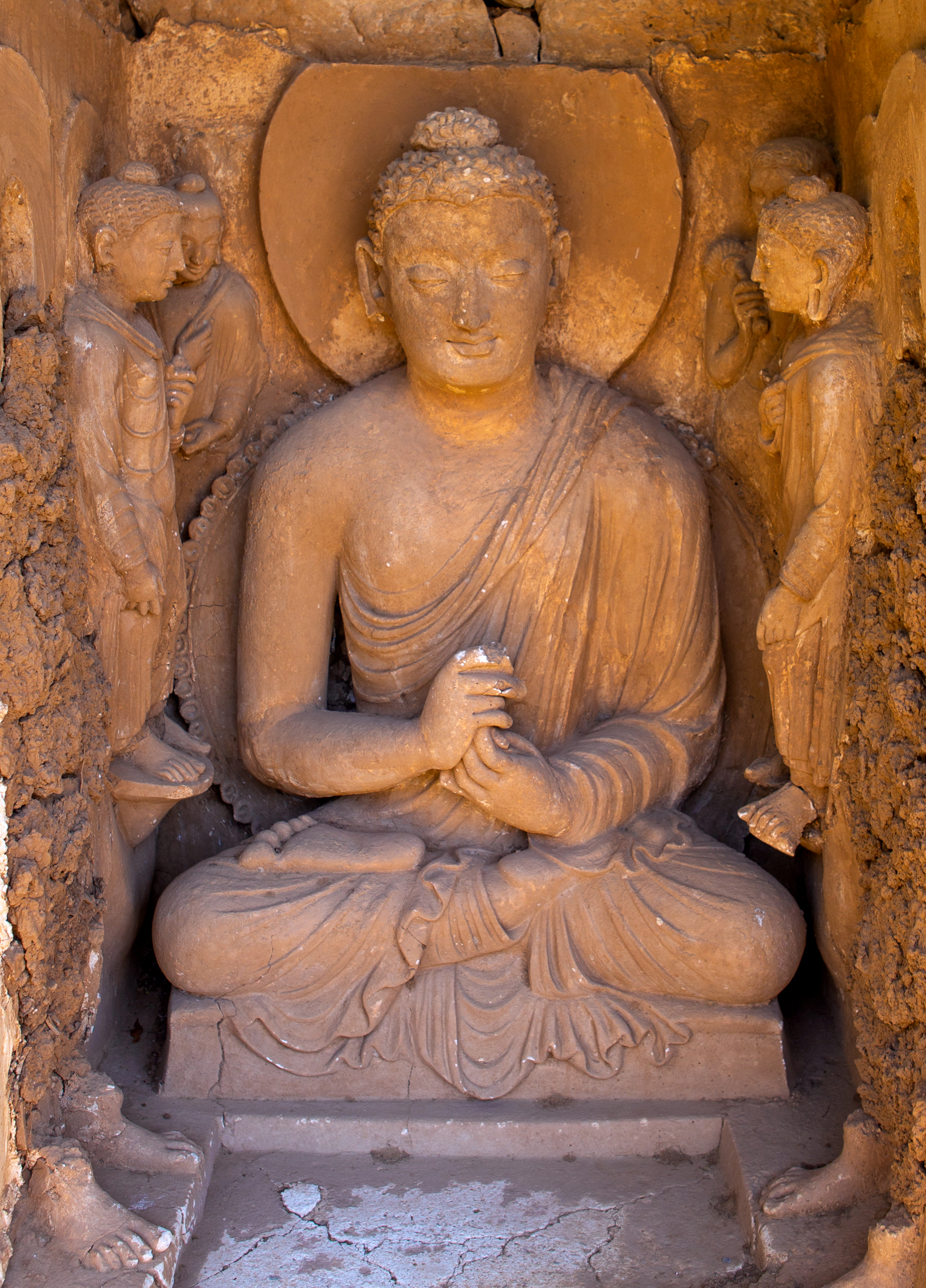
Buddha statue, Bhamala Stupa

The stupa has a characteristic cruciform plan, with flights of stairs in the four cardinal directions, which is one of the last steps of the evolution of the Gandhara stupa, the preceding steps being:

1. the Dharmarajika Stupa, with a near-Indian design of a semi-hemispheric stupa almost directly on the ground surface
2. the Loriyan Tangai stupa, with an elongated shape and many narrative reliefs
3. the near-pyramidal Jaulian stupa

The cruciform design further evolved into the towering design of the second Kanishka stupa.

== Specifications ==
According to current understanding, the shape of the main stupa is cruciform, and it is the largest surviving example of this shape in the Taxila and Gandhara regions. There are about nineteen small, votive stupas in the courtyard surrounding the main one.

== Gallery ==
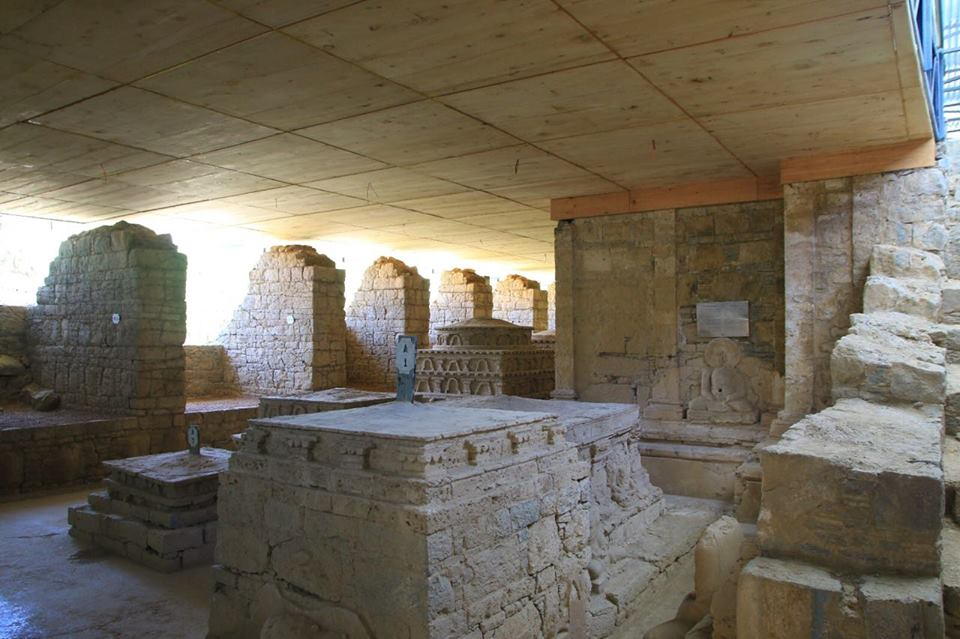
Smaller votive stupas

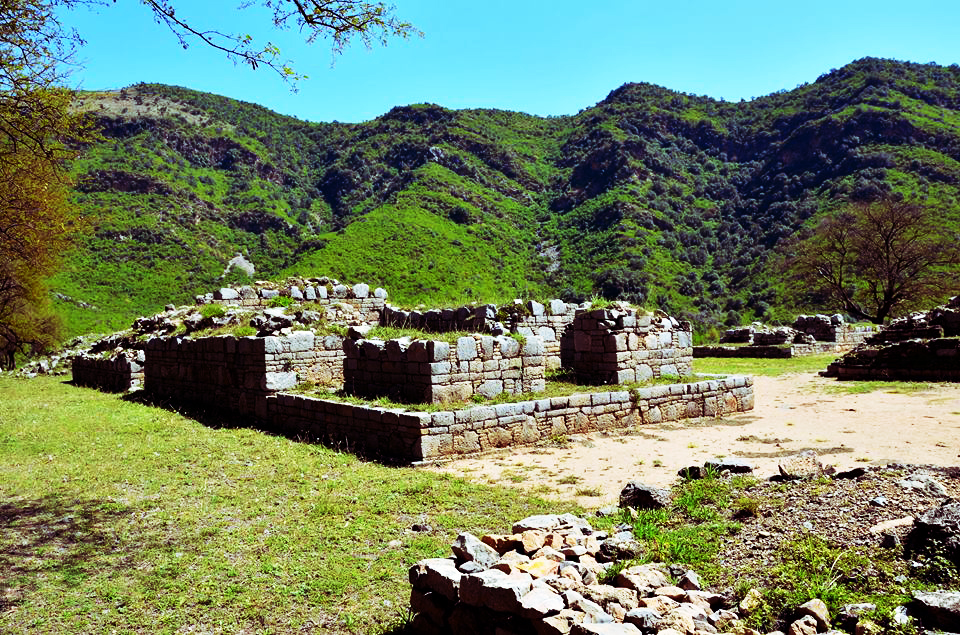
Monastery cells

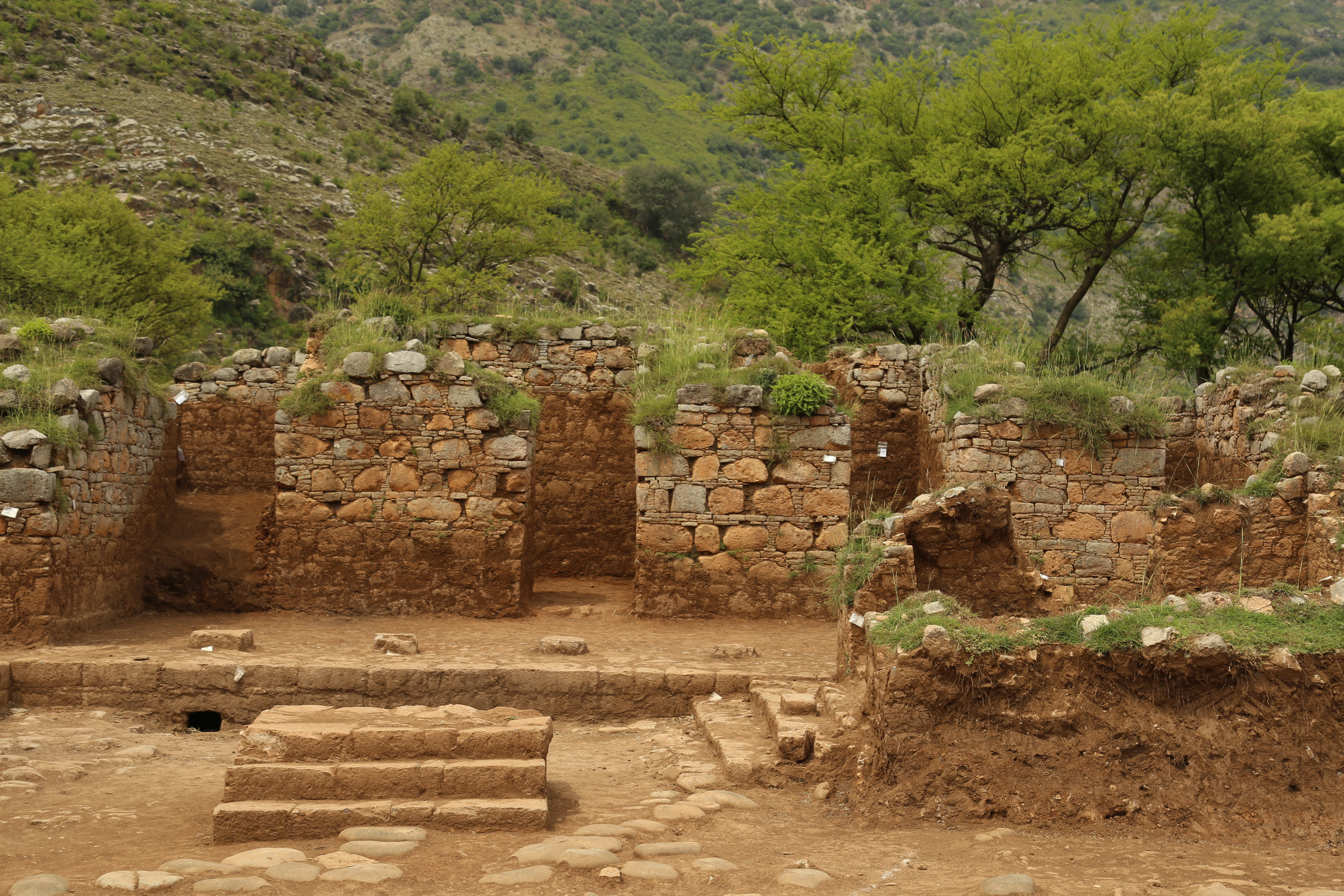

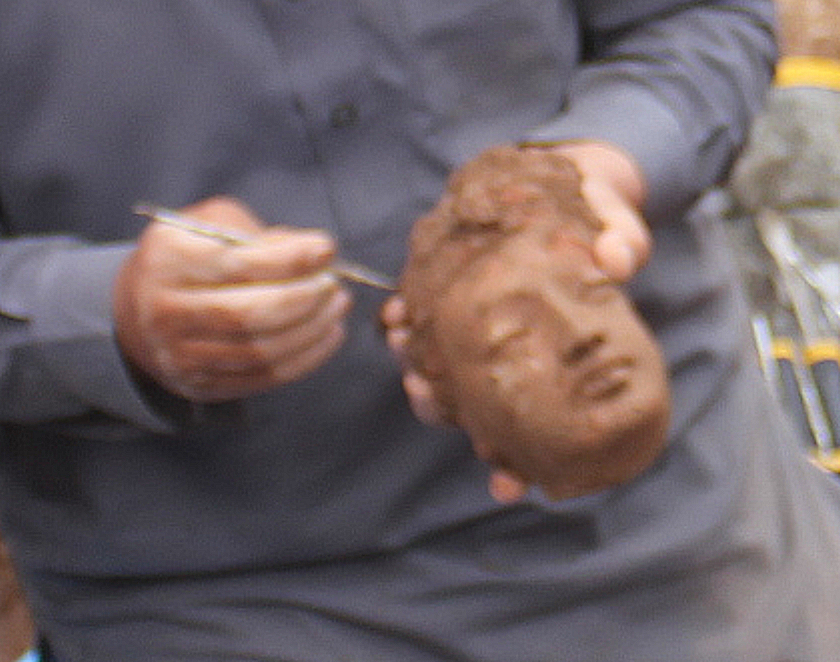
A Gandharan sculpture being excavated

== See also ==
- List of UNESCO World Heritage Sites in Pakistan
- List of museums in Pakistan
