= Ali Masjid Fort =

Fort in Khyber Pakhtunkhwa, Pakistan

Coordinates: 34.033254933896664°N 71.25701144589809°E

Ali Masjid Fort علی مسجد فورٹ
- Khyber Pakhtunkhwa province, Pakistan
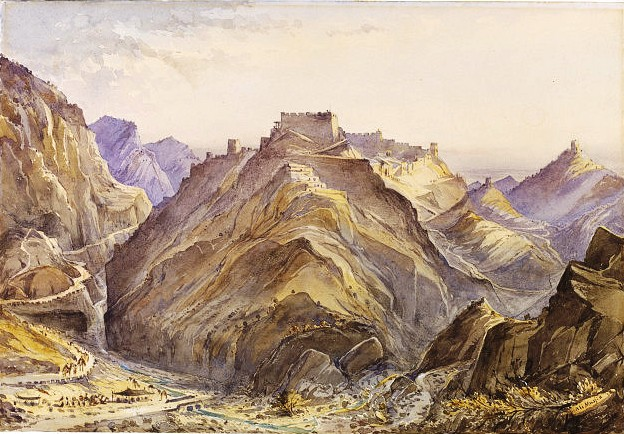
- 1890 painting

Site information
- Type: Fort

Site history
- Built: 1837

Ali Masjid Fort (Pashto: د علي مسجد قلا; Urdu: علی مسجد فورٹ) is situated on a high location above Ali Masjid, the narrowest point of the Khyber Pass, in the Khyber Pakhtunkhwa province on the north west frontier of Pakistan.

Originally within Afghanistan, the fort was first constructed in 1837 under Emir Dost Muhammad Khan, and was the location for a number of conflicts between Afghan and British-led forces during the 19th century. The fort was captured by the British in 1839 during the First Anglo-Afghan War, and again in November 1878 during the Second Anglo-Afghan War at the Battle of Ali Masjid. In May 1879 the Khyber Pass was ceded to British control by the Treaty of Gandamak, after which the fort was within the British Raj. In 1947 it became a part of Pakistan.

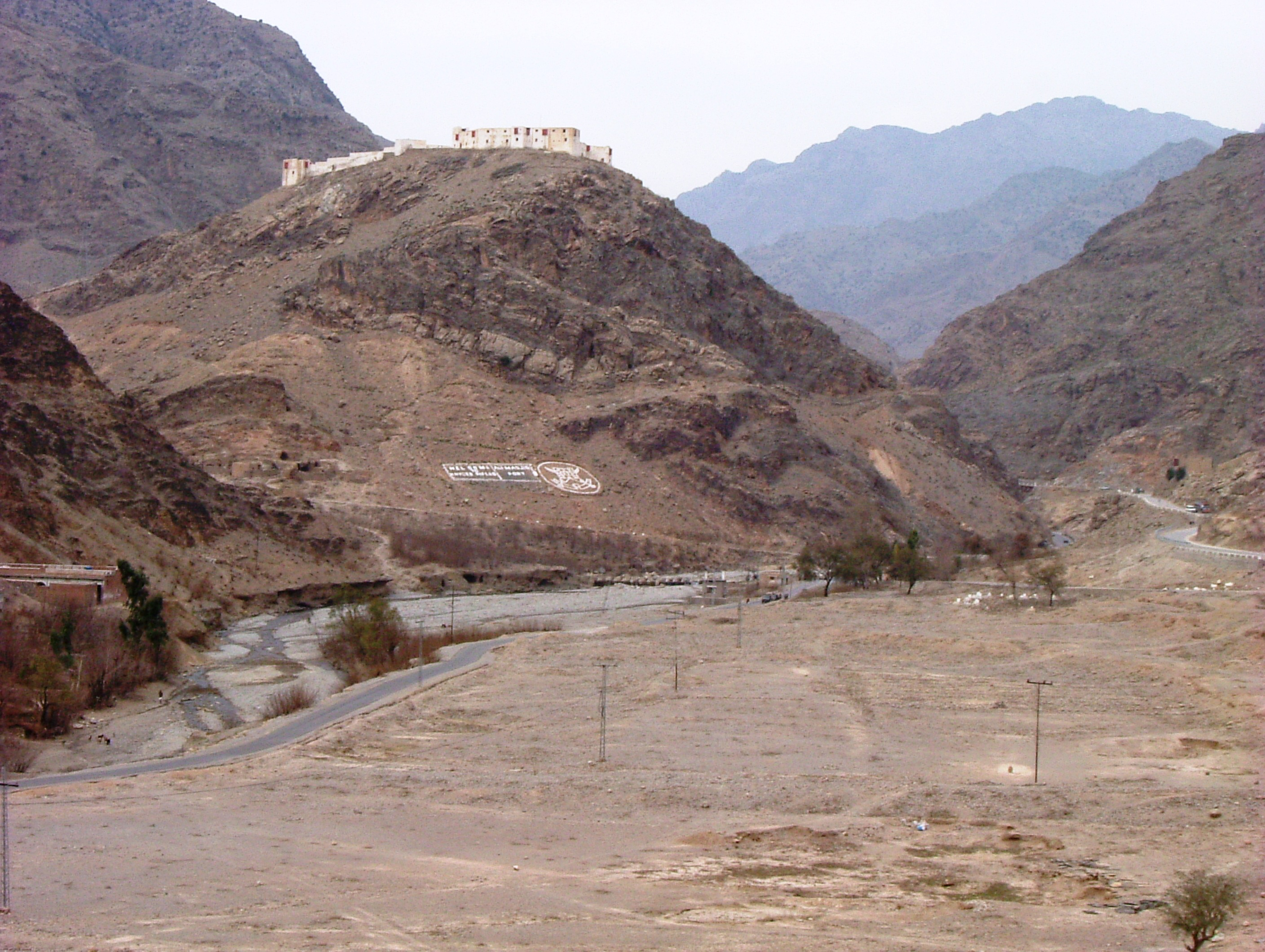
Modern view of the fort

== See also ==
- List of forts in Pakistan
