= Jinnan Wali Dheri =

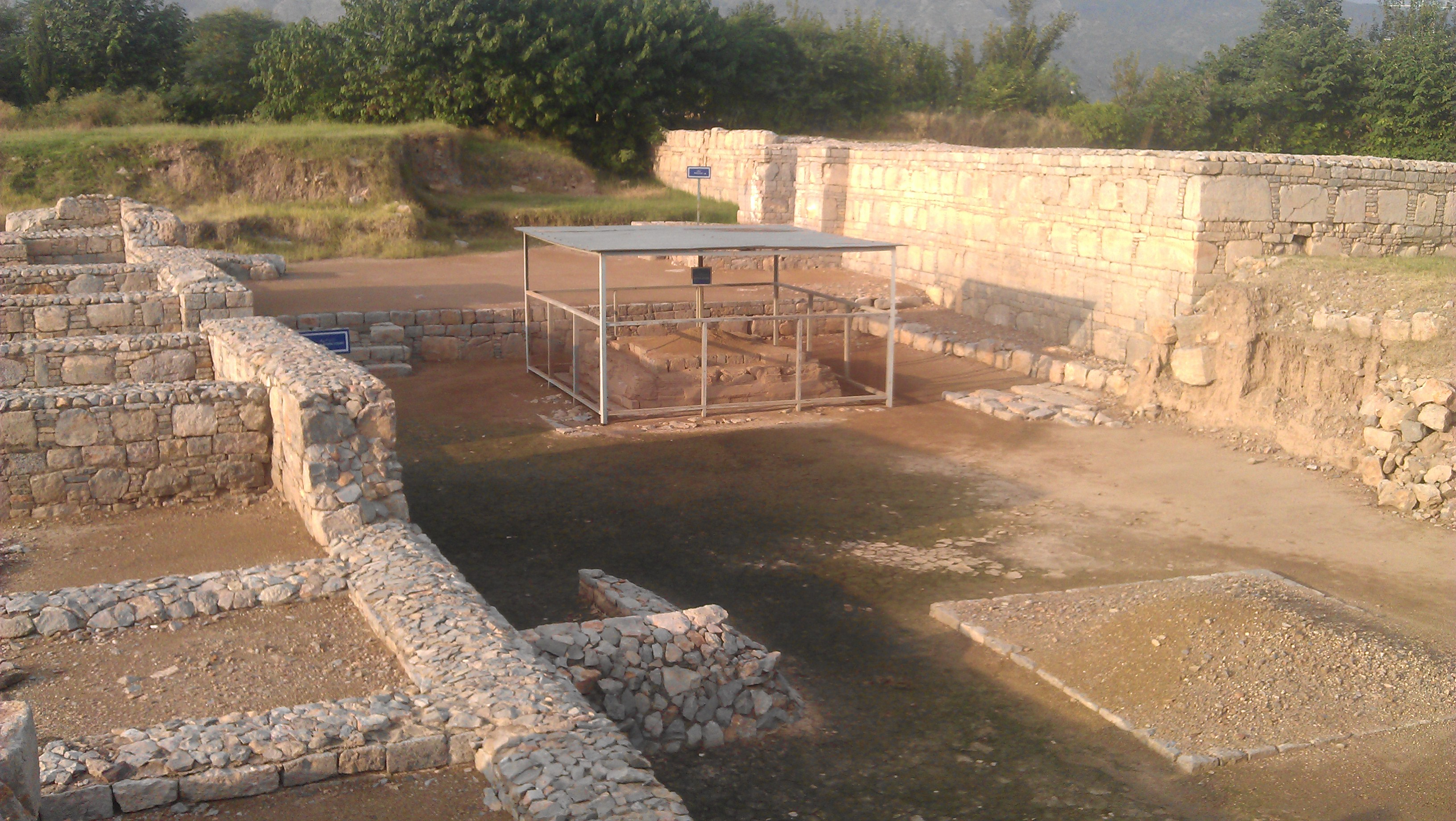
The Archeological site of Jinnan Wali Dheri, Taxila Pakistan

Jinnan Wali Dheri ("the mound of jinns") is an archaeological site near Taxila, Pakistan. It is the remains of a Buddhist monastic complex dating to the 5th century AD, part of the remains of the Gandhara civilization. It is one of the best-preserved Buddhist monastic complexes in the Taxila valley. The complex includes a main stupa, votive stupas, an enclosure around the main stupa provided with chapels facing towards main stupa, two platforms of rather late period constructed in front of the chapels situated on the both corners of the eastern wall, an upper court votive stupa and a monastery/sangharama on the eastern side of the stupa.

Discoveries at Jinnan Wali Dera include fragments of murals on the walls of the corridor of a monastery leading to the main stupa. The paintings collapsed when the site was destroyed by the White Huns in the 5th century.

In 2010, the complex was opened to the public.

== Gallery ==
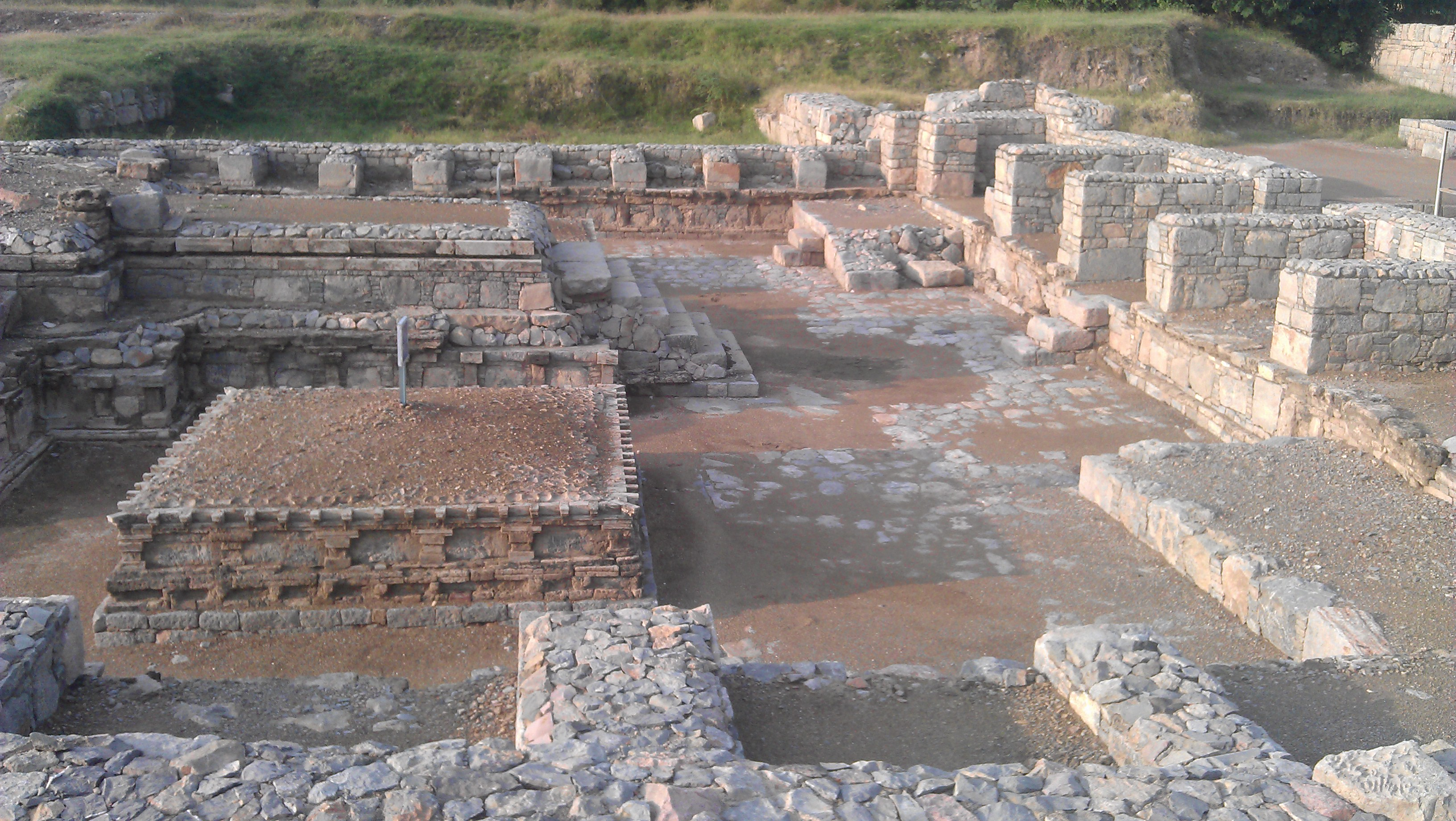
Jinnan Wali Dheri, Taxila

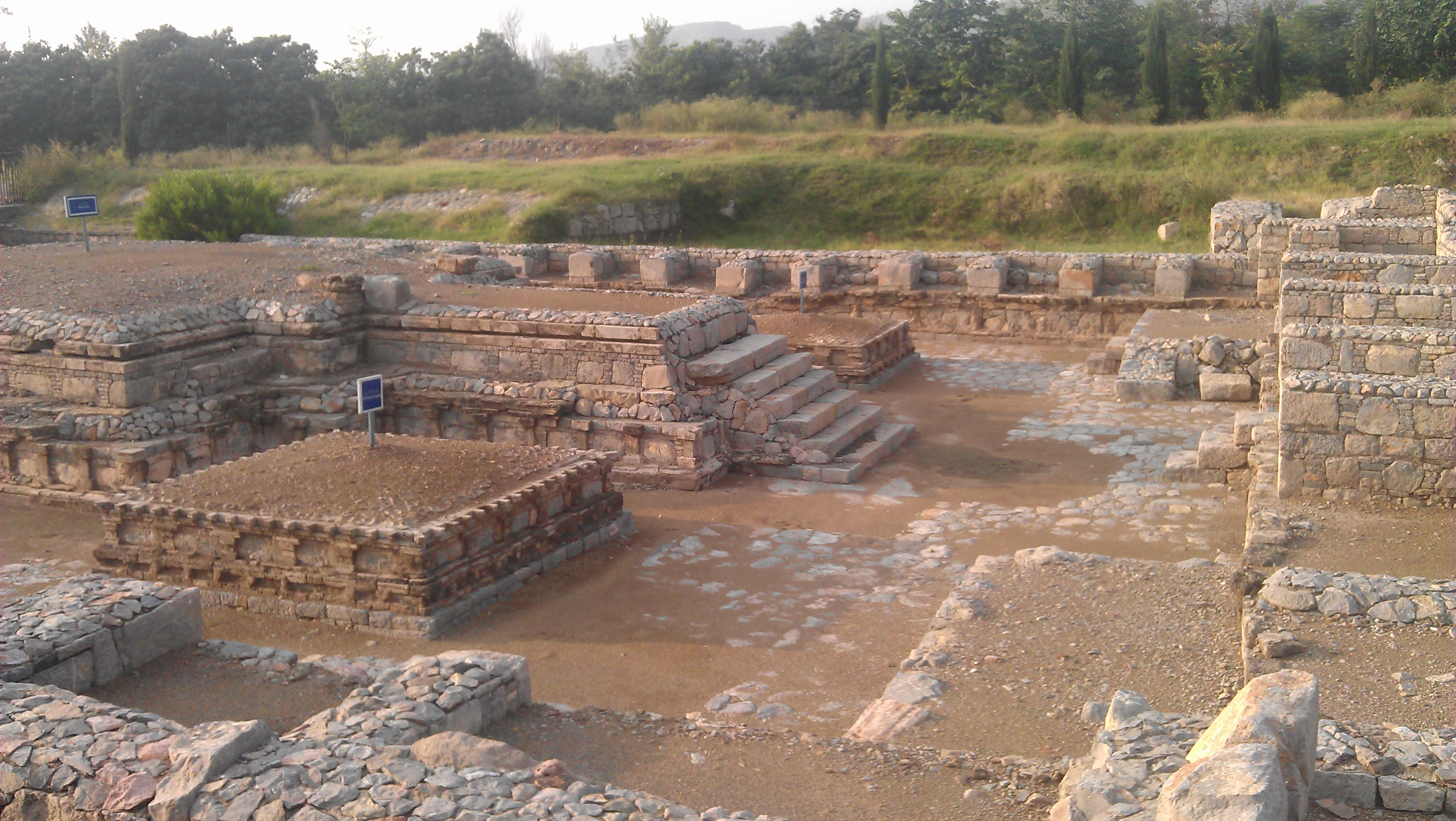

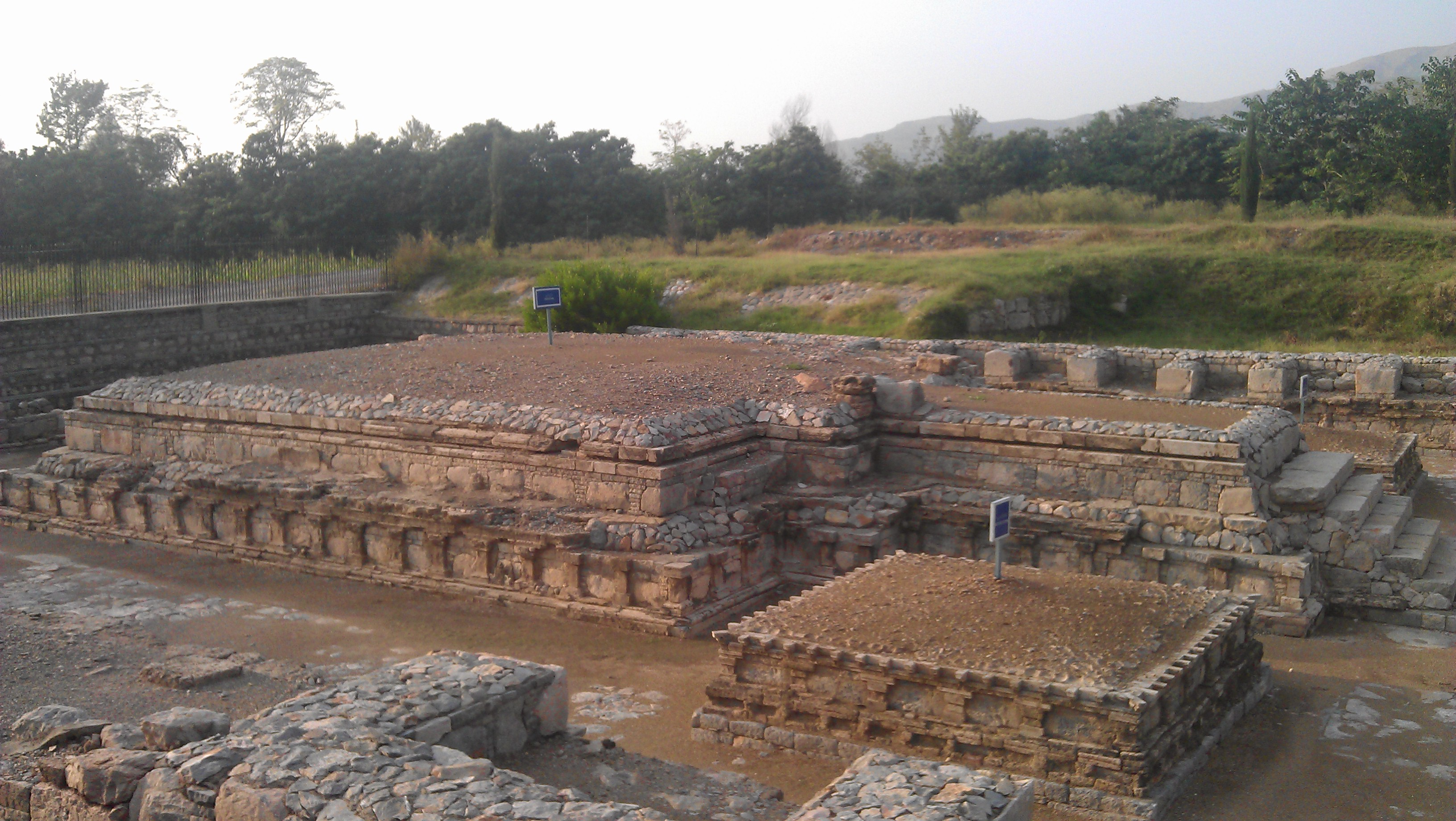

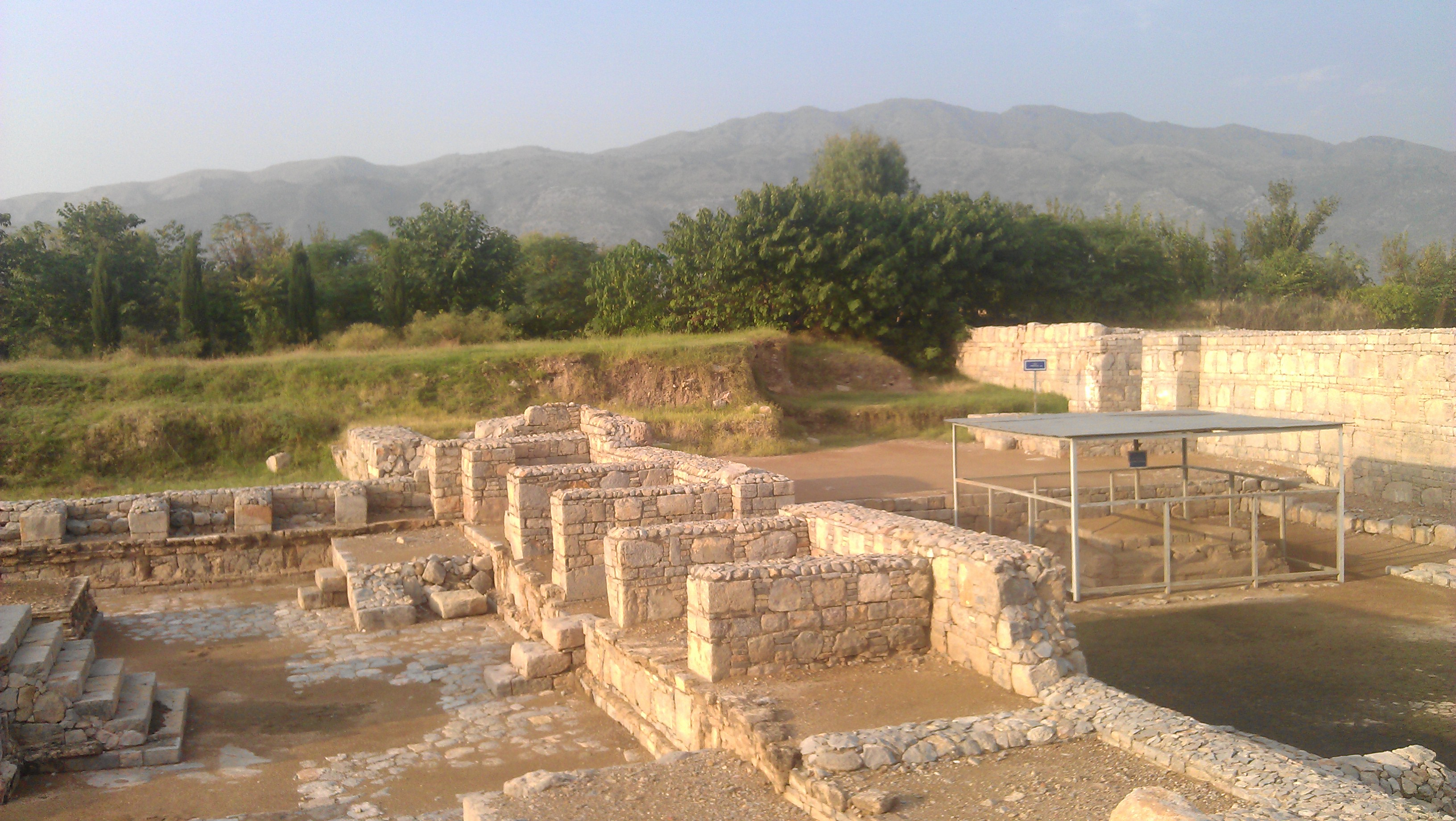
