= Sphola Stupa =

Buddhist monument in Khyber Phaktunkhwa, Pakistan

Coordinates: 34.0747°N 71.2083°E

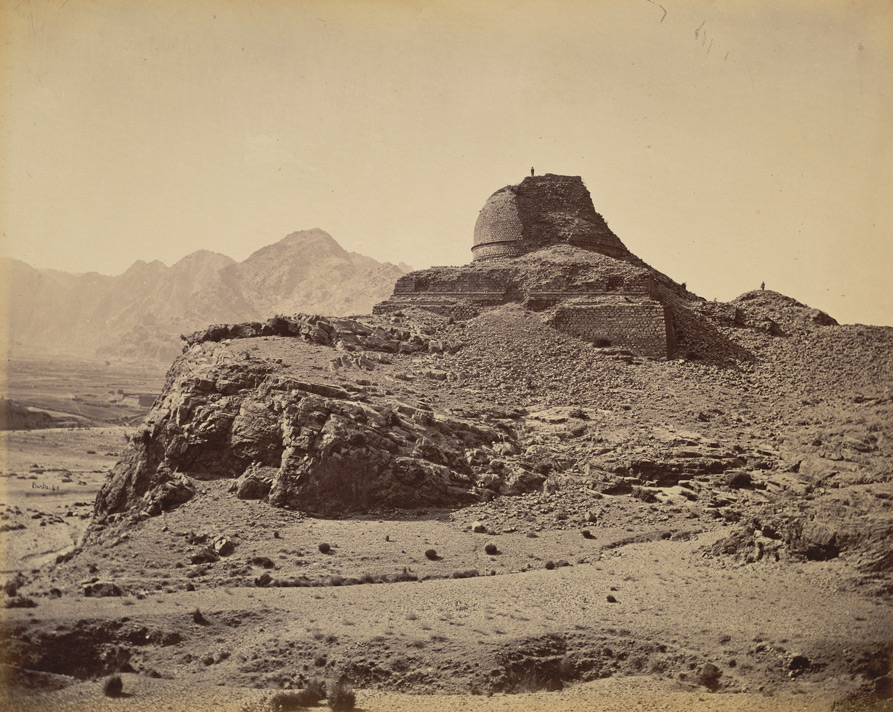
Buddhist Stupa at Sphola

Sphola Stupa is a Buddhist monument located in the Khyber Pass, Khyber Pakhtunkhwa of Pakistan. The monument located about 25 kilometers from Jamrūd is on a high rocky ledge and consists of a stone mound supported by a tiered base. Large sections of the stone have fallen away, particularly to the right of the mound. A man is standing on the top of the mound, and another man is standing on a pile of rubble to the right. There is a valley beyond with steep mountains rising behind it.

This ruined stupa built of stones features a dome resting upon a three-tiered base. Sphola sits in a ravine located in Zarai village midway between Ali Masjid and Landi Kotal in the Khyber Pass. The 2nd century stupa may have been constructed towards the end of the Kushan Empire or according to some sources soon after third to fifth centuries. It is the most complete Buddhist monument in the Khyber Pass. It is a reminder of the great Kushana Empire and Buddhism nexus which is often depicted in Gandhara artefacts. Gandhara sculptures were excavated at this very stupa and are now housed in the museum in Peshawar.

Sphola Stupa is possibly the only such monument left in the Khyber Pass area. But instead of being treated as a conservation site, it has been turned into a Frontier Constabulary check post – the height provides a useful vantage point to the troops.
