= Mansehra Rock Edicts =

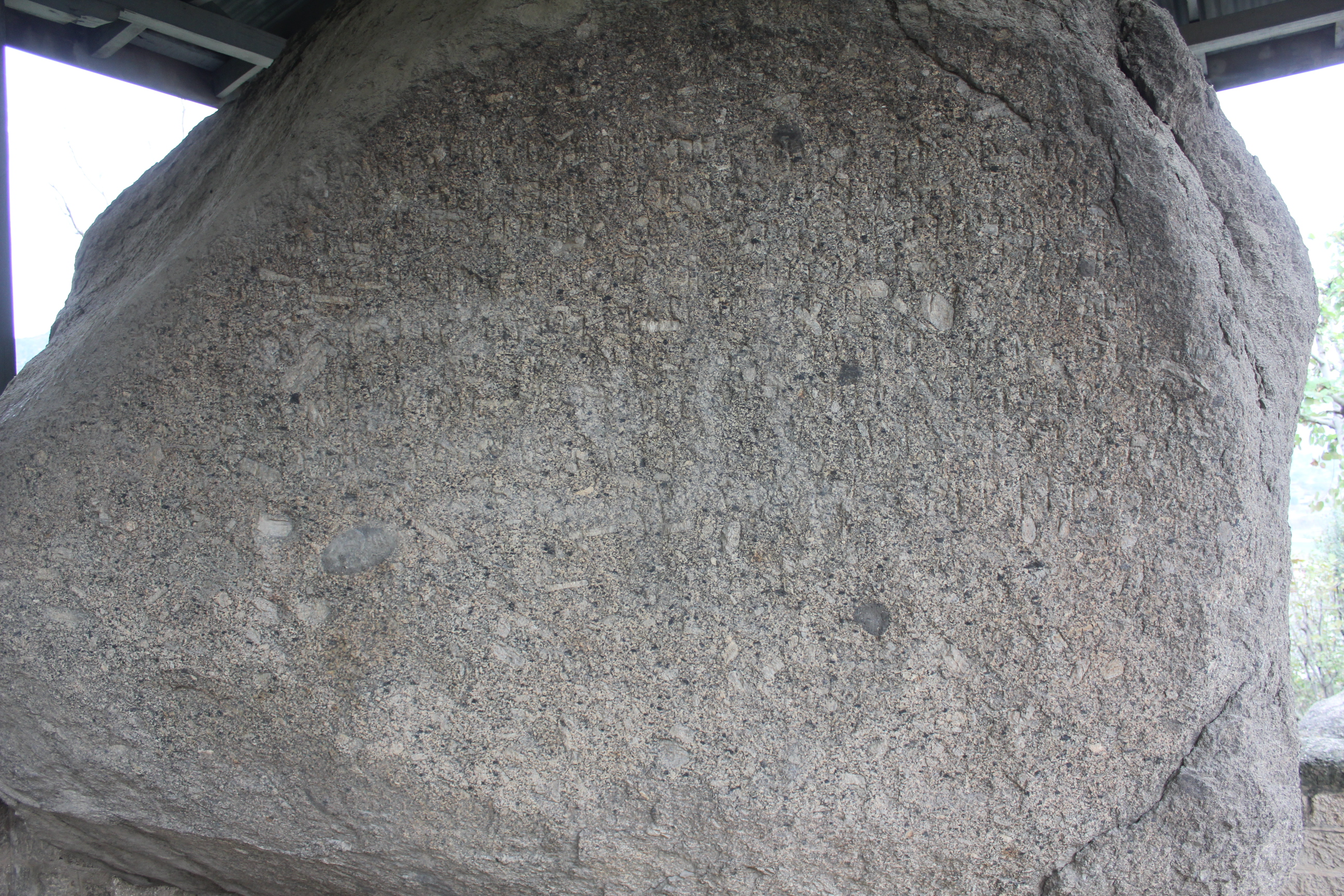
- Detail of the upper rock inscription.

- Location within Pakistan
- 34°20′0″N 73°10′0″E
- Location: Mansehra, Mansehra District, Khyber Pakhtunkhwa

Site notes
- Website: UNESCO World Heritage Sites tentative list

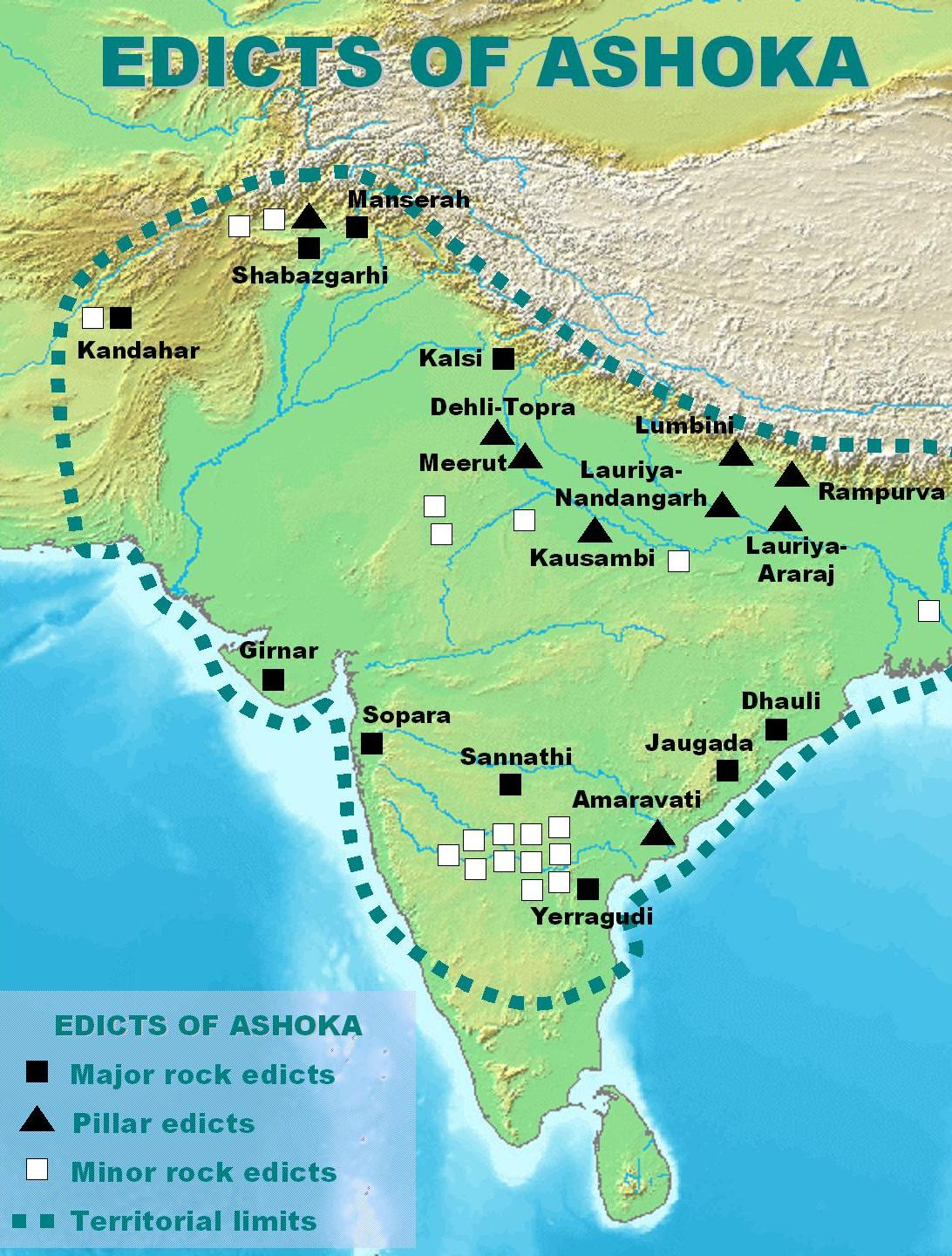
Edicts of Ashoka, the Mansehra Rock Edicts lie in the extreme north-west of the Mauryan Empire

Mansehra Rock Edicts are fourteen edicts of the Mauryan emperor Ashoka, inscribed on rocks in Mansehra in Khyber Pakhtunkhwa, Pakistan. The edicts are cut into three boulders and date back to 3rd century BC and they are written in the ancient Indic script of Gandhara culture, Kharosthi. The edicts mention aspects of Ashoka’s dharma. The site was submitted for inclusion in the World Heritage Sites and is currently in the tentative list.

== Location ==
The edicts are inscribed on an outcrop of a small rocky mountain outside the city of Mansehra in Khyber Pakhtunkhwa province of Pakistan. The site is located near to the Karakoram Highway on the ancient Silk Route. The archaeological city of Taxila is located in south and Abbottabad lies very near to the east of the site.

== History ==
Ashoka was dismayed by the destruction caused by his military during the conquest of Kalingas and in remorse later converted to Buddhism. Following his conversion, Ashoka visited sacred Buddhist locations throughout the Mauryan Empire and erected multiple pillars bearing his inscriptions of a new morality law. Mansehra Rock Edicts are one of the 33 inscriptions of Edicts of Ashoka describing expansion of Buddhism and his Law of Piety or dharma.

The fourteen edicts contain text in the Kharosthi script which is an ancient script used in the Gandhara. The Kharoṣṭhi script was first deciphered by James Prinsep after which the Edicts of Ashoka in Kharosthi script were translated.

== Conservation ==
Due to environmental degradation, the rocks are eroding and the script is fading rendering it unreadable. To protect the site, Department of Archeology and Museum, Pakistan provided canopies to cover the rocks and shelter them from weather conditions.

== World Heritage Site ==
In 2004, the site was submitted for inclusion in the UNESCO World Heritage Sites by Department of Archaeology and Museums, Pakistan. It was submitted in the Cultural criteria ii, iii, and vi.

== See also ==
- Greco-Buddhism
- Gandharan Buddhism
- Gandhāran Buddhist texts
- List of UNESCO World Heritage Sites in Pakistan
- List of Edicts of Ashoka
- Pillars of Ashoka
