= Amluk-Dara stupa =

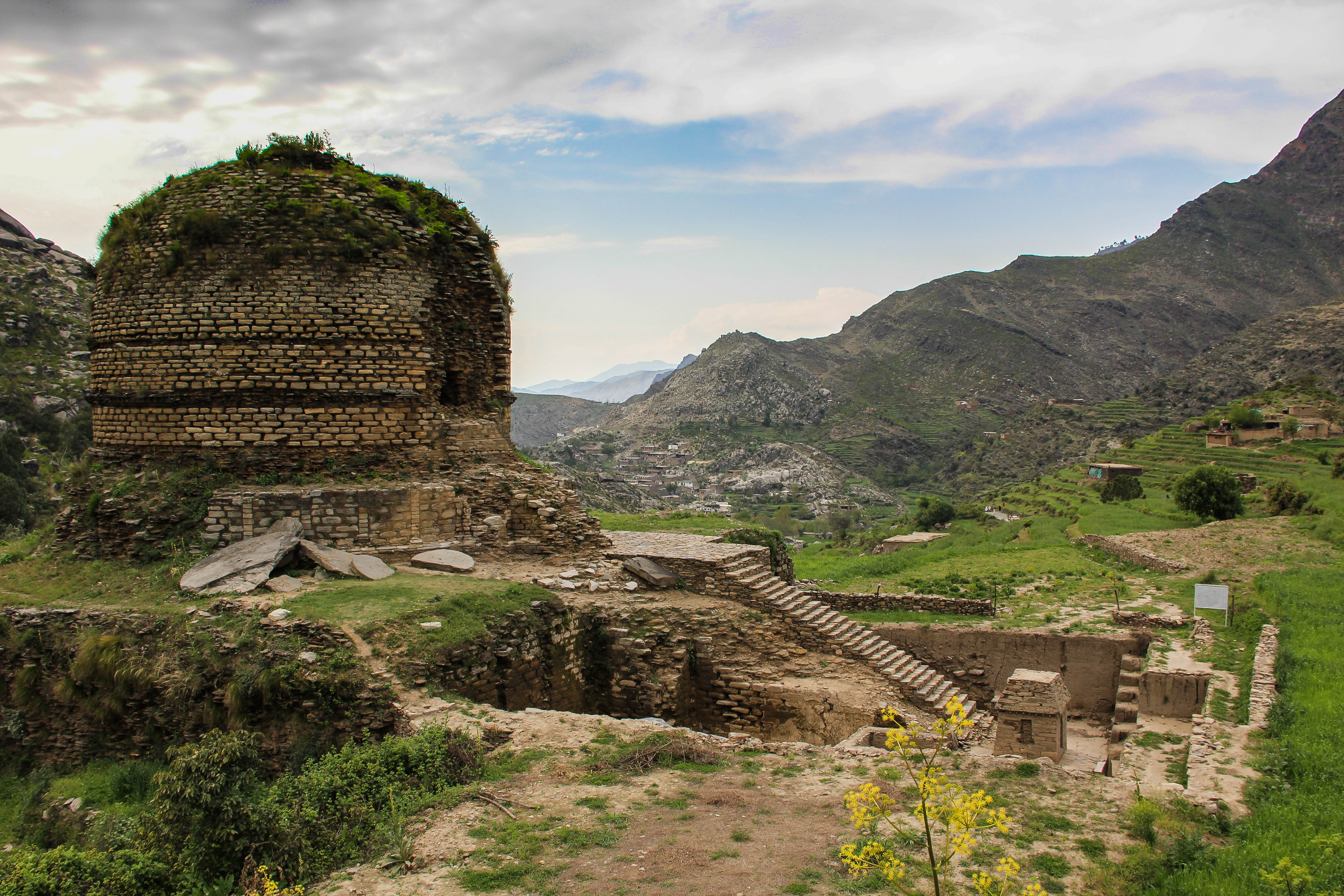

Location
- Location: Swat Valley
- Country: Pakistan
- Interactive map of Amluk-Dara stupa
- Coordinates: 34.6474503°N 72.2898788°E

Amluk-Dara stupa is located in Swat valley of Pakistan. It is a part of Gandhara civilization at Amluk-Dara. The stupa is believed to have been built in the third century. The stupa was first discovered by a Hungarian-British archaeologist Sir Aurel Stein in 1926. It was later studied by Domenico Faccena in the 60s and 70s.

The foundation of the stupa is a square plinth about 4 meters thick. This is surmounted by a hemispherical dome measuring 7 meter in height and 21 meters in diameter, making it visible for miles around it. Though it is the best example of a stupa in Swat, it is unprotected and is being damaged by treasure seekers.

== Gallery ==
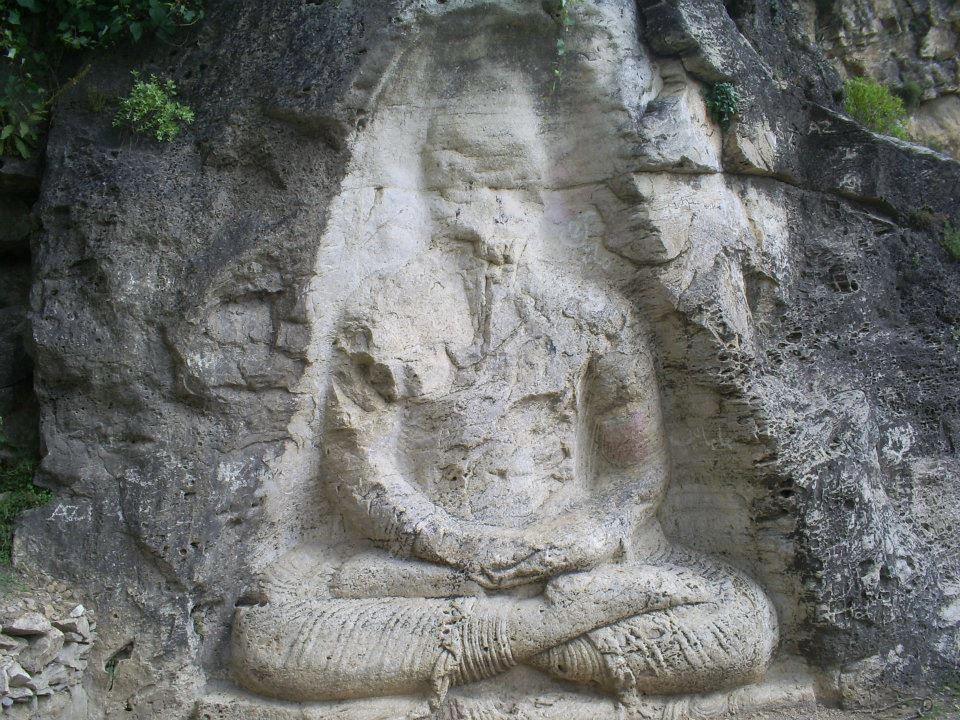

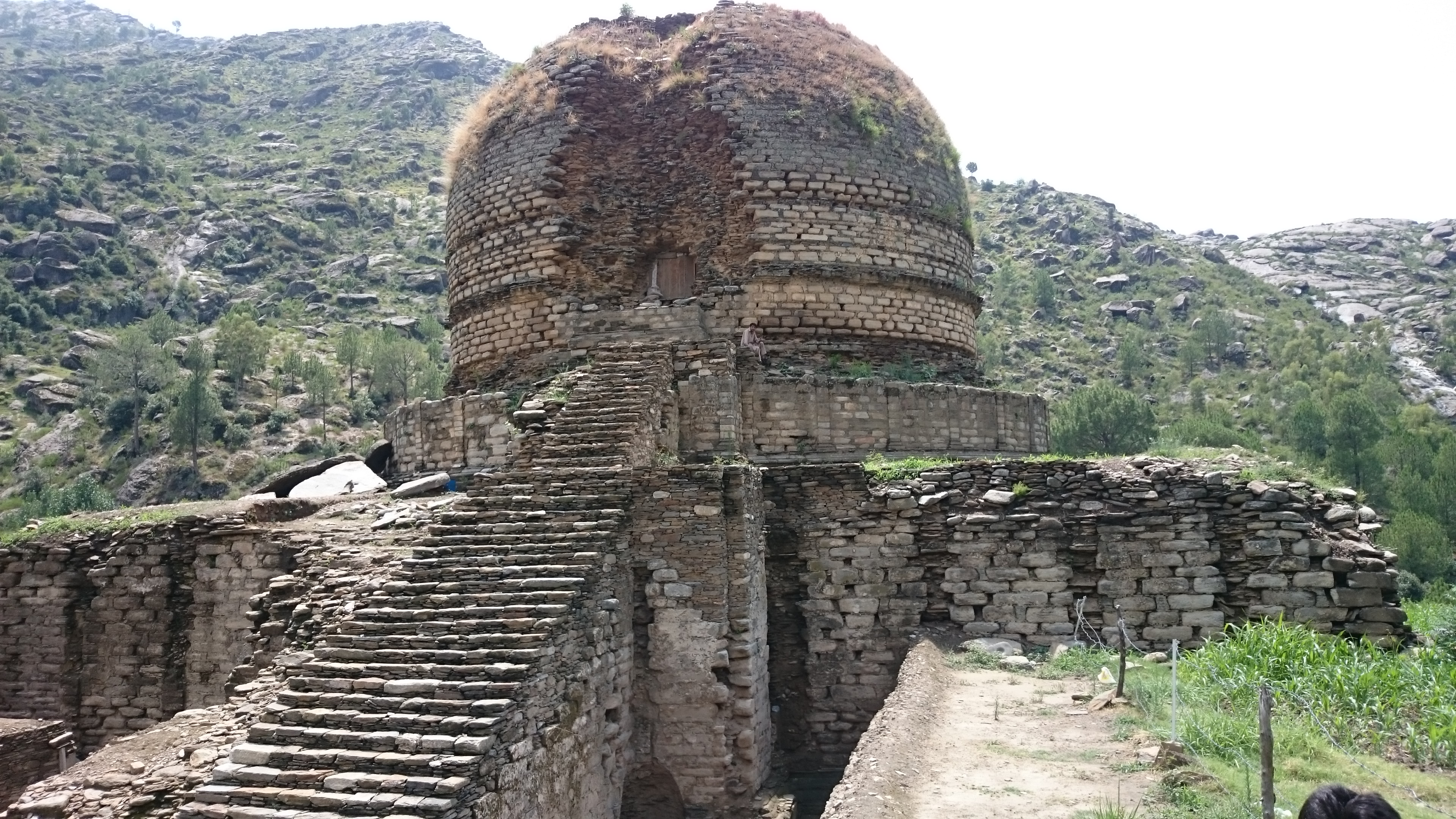

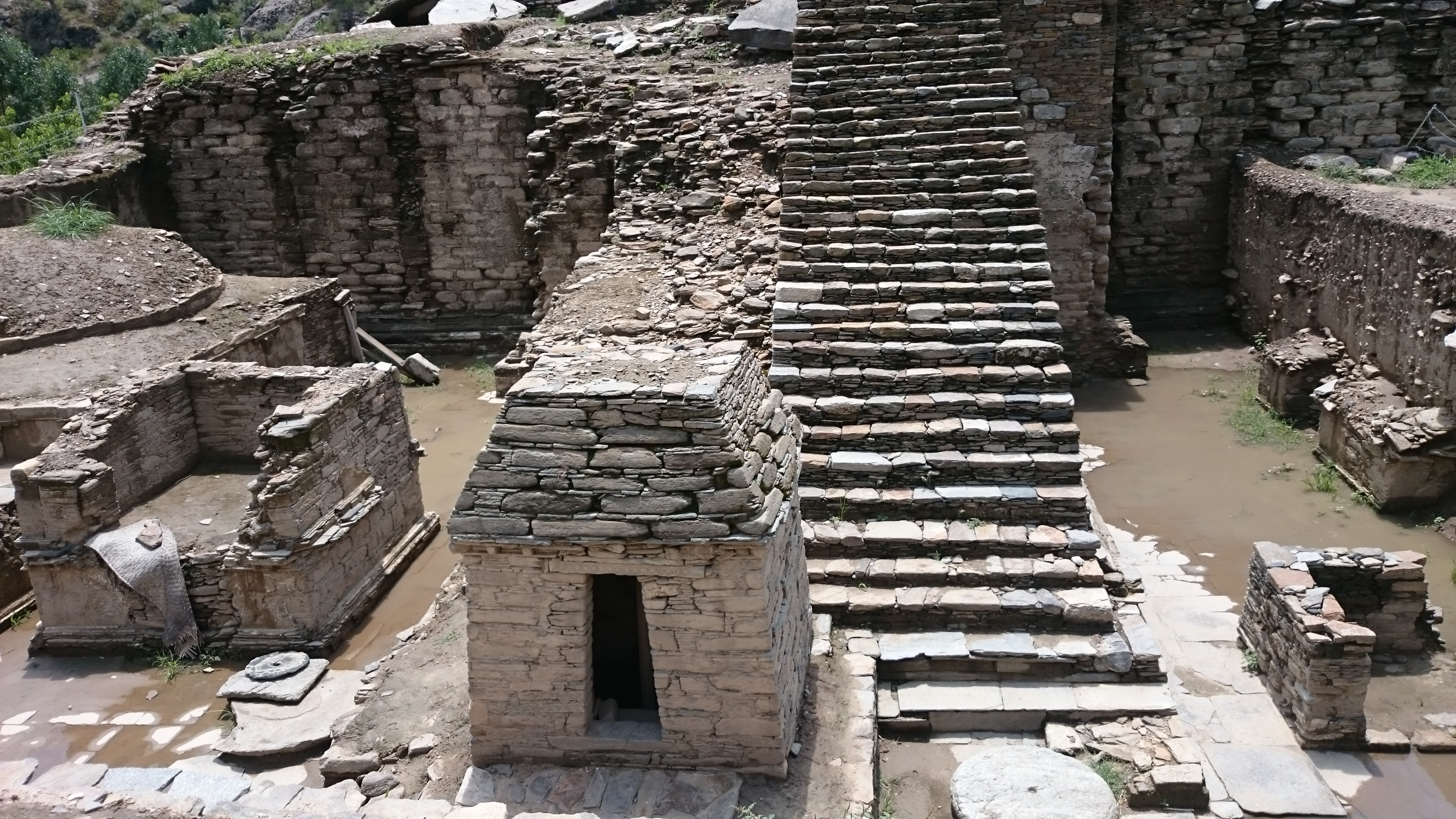
