= Alexandra Fort =

Fort in Khyber Pakhtunkhwa, Pakistan

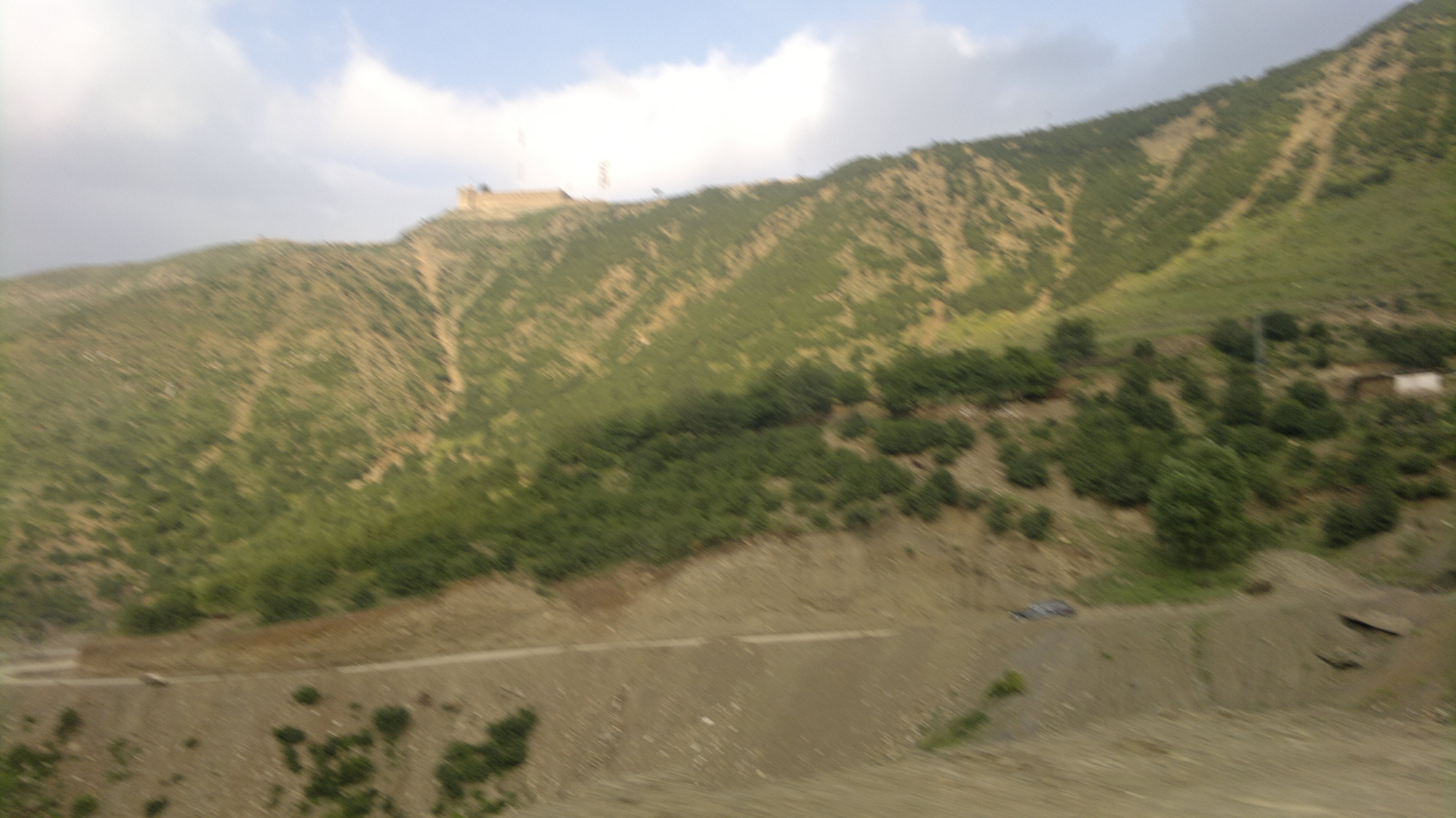
Alexandra Fort as seen from a distance

Alexandra Fort, also known as Alexandra Post or simply Razmak Fort, is a fort in Razmak, North Waziristan District, Khyber Pakhtunkhwa, Pakistan. It is named after 3rd Queen Alexandra's Own Gurkha Rifles.

It was built during British India era. The British forces established the fort to control warrior tribes on both sides of the Shora Alqad.
