= Ranigat =

Buddhist ruins

Ranigat راني ګټ
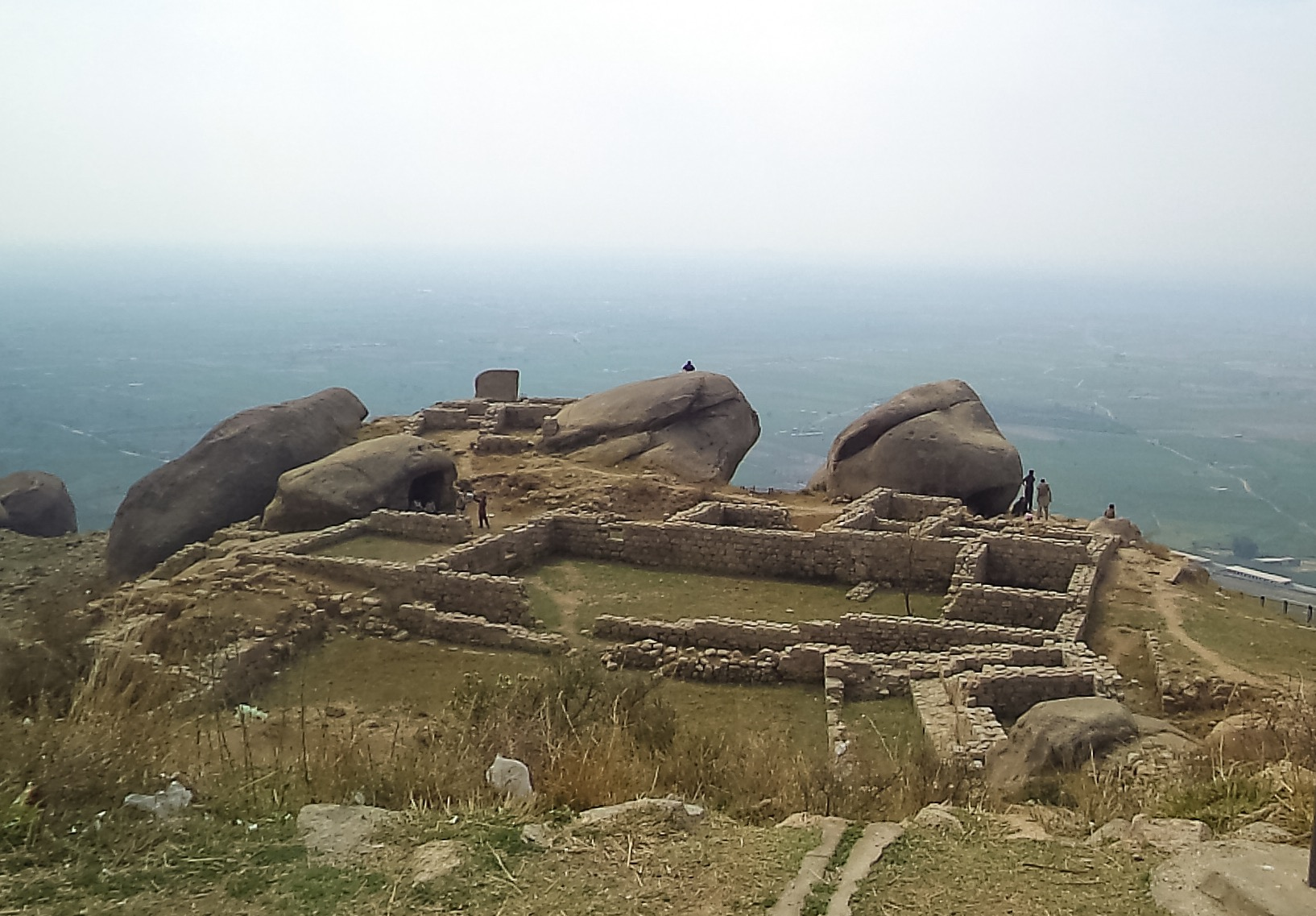
- Ranigat was built on a mountaintop overlooking the Valley of Peshawar

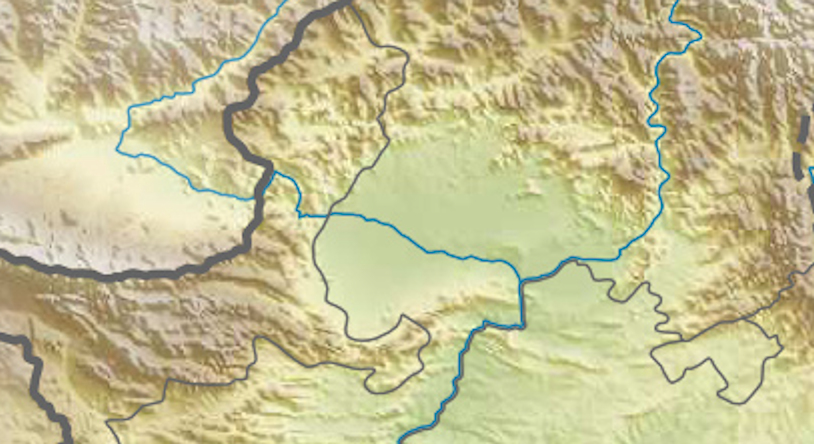
- Location within Pakistan Location within Gandhara Location within Khyber Pakhtunkhwa
- 34.2306°N 72.4488°E
- Periods: Gandhara
- Location: Buner; Khyber Pakhtunkhwa; Pakistan

History
- Built: 2nd century CE
- Abandoned: 6th century

Site notes
- Archaeologists: Alexander Cunningham; Henry Walter Bellew

UNESCO World Heritage Site
- Official name: Archaeological Site of Ranigat
- Type: Tentative listing
- Criteria: ii, iv
- Reference no.: 1879

Ranigat (Pashto: راني ګټ, lit. 'the queen of stones') is a 2500-year-old Buddhist archaeological site belonging to the Gandahara civilization located in the Buner District of Khyber Pakhtunkhwa, Pakistan. Ranigat is a good example of the Buddhist past of the area. The site is located on top of a hill, accessible by climbing the stairs constructed by the Japanese. The main attractions include the Stupas, a big rock erected by the ancient people at some distance that they probably used to worship. The city or town was beautifully designed, and stones from the local mountains have been extensively used. Ranigat is easily accessible through the M1 and N35. It is about 20 km (12 mi) away from Swabi and 100 km (62 mi) from Peshawar and Islamabad.

It is a collection of 2nd-century CE Buddhist ruins spread over an area of 4 km^{2} (1.5 sq mi) that dates from the Gandhara civilization.

According to archeologists, Ranigat remained the center of Buddhist art and culture for centuries. Ranigat has been a celebrated part of folklore, with songs and stories written about it.

== Etymology ==
The word Ranigat is the combination of the words 'rani' and 'gat', from two different languages. "Rani" is a word derived from Sanskrit that denotes a queen, while "gat" is a Pashto word that denotes a large rock, hence the archaeological site of Ranigat, meaning "Queen's Rock". The referenced rock is on top of a mountain that is visible from far away.

According to the archeologists, Ranigat, a developed state, remained the center of Buddhist art and culture for centuries.

Ranigat, belonging to the period of the first-sixth century AD and protected under the Antiquities Act 1975, has been a celebrated part of folklore, whose songs and stories still echo from the coffee-hued ruins in Totalai in the Buner District of Khyber Pakhtunkhwa, Pakistan. The site of Ranigat is situated on top of a ridge, where the remains of the region's largest Buddhist monastic complex reside. Structures on the site include stupas, monasteries, shrines, drainage networks, and other buildings. Ranigat is a 2500-year-old Buddhist archaeological site belonging to the Gandhara civilization and has good evidence of the Buddhist past of the area.

== Access ==
The site is located in Nogram village in District Buner and can be reached by a small road from Nogram, where ample parking space for about 15 cars is available. From parking, there are 500 stairs to the site constructed by the Japanese government. The main attractions include the Stupas, monasteries, drainage systems, and a big rock erected by the ancient people at some distance that they probably used to worship. The city was beautifully designed, and stones from the local mountains have been extensively used. Ranigat is easily accessible through the M1 (motorway) or N35. It is about 20 km (12 mi) away from Swabi and 100 km (62 mi) from Peshawar or Islamabad.

It is a big stone atop the local hill and partitions the two districts, Swabi and Buner, in the Khyber Pakhtoonkhawa province. The height of the Ranigat is roughly 40 m (130 ft), and its width is almost 25 m (82 ft).

== Conservation ==
Under excavation by a joint UNESCO-Japanese team since the 1980s, the site has had issues related to vandalism. The site is now under surveillance and is surrounded by a barbed-wire fence.

This site was added to the UNESCO World Heritage Tentative List on January 30, 2004, in the Cultural category.

== See also ==
- Takht Bhai (Another historic site in Mardan)
