= Banar, Pakistan =

Neighbourhood in Mingora, Pakistan

Banar
- Neighbourhood
- Country: Pakistan
- Province: Khyber Pakhtunkhwa
- District: Swat
- Time zone: UTC+5 (PST)

Banar (Pashto: بنړ) is a neighbourhood in Mingora, Swat District in the Khyber Pakhtunkhwa province of Pakistan.

According to Khyber Pakhtunkhwa Local Government Act 2013. District Swat has 67 Wards, of which the total number of Village Councils is 170, and Neighbourhood Councils is 44.

== See also ==
- Babuzai
- Shahdara, Swat
- Swat District
