= Rang Muhallah =

- Union Council
- Country: Pakistan
- Province: Khyber Pakhtunkhwa
- District: Swat
- Time zone: UTC+5 (PST)

Rang Muhallah (also spelled: Rang Mohallah)(Pashto: رنګ محله)is an administrative unit, known as Union council or Wards in Tehsil Babuzai, of Swat District in the Khyber Pakhtunkhwa province of Pakistan.

According to Khyber Pakhtunkhwa Local Government Act 2013. District Swat has 67 Wards, of which total number of Village Councils is 170, and Neighbourhood Councils is 44.

Rang Muhallah is Territorial Ward, which is further divided in four Neighbourhood Councils:

1. Rang Muhallah i (Neighbourhood Council)
2. Rang Muhallah ii (Neighbourhood Council)
3. Gumbat Maira i (Neighbourhood Council)
4. Gumbat Maira ii (Neighbourhood Council)

== See also ==
- Babuzai
- Swat District
