= Kokarai =

- Union Council
- Country: Pakistan
- Province: Khyber Pakhtunkhwa
- District: Swat

Population (2017)
  - Total: 24,568
- Time zone: UTC+5 (PST)

Kokarai (Pashto: کوکارۍ) is an administrative unit, known as Union council or Ward in Babuzai Tehsil, Swat District in the Khyber Pakhtunkhwa province of Pakistan.

According to the Khyber Pakhtunkhwa Local Government Act 2013, the Swat District has 67 Wards, of which the total number of Village Councils is 170, and the number of Neighbourhood Councils is 44.

Kokarai is divided into four Village Councils:

1. Ashargarai
2. Jambil
3. Kokarai No. 1
4. Kokarai No. 2

Kokarai is surrounded by high, green mountains. Its people are agricultural.

== See also ==
- Babuzai
- Swat District
