= Amankot Faizabad =

- Union Council
- Country: Pakistan
- Province: Khyber Pakhtunkhwa
- District: Swat
- Time zone: UTC+5 (PST)

Amanakot Faizabad (Pashto: امان کوټ، فيض آباد) is an administrative unit, known as Union council or Wards in Tehsil Babuzai, of Swat District in the Khyber Pakhtunkhwa province of Pakistan.

According to Khyber Pakhtunkhwa Local Government Act 2013. District Swat has 67 Wards, of which total number of Village Councils is 170, and Neighbourhood Council is 44.

Amanakot Faizabad is Territorial Ward, which is further divided into three Neighbourhood Councils:

1. Amankot No. 1 (Neighbourhood Council)
2. Amankot No. 2 (Neighbourhood Council)
3. Amankot/Faiz Abad (Neighbourhood Council)

== See also ==
- Babuzai and Yousafzi
- Swat District
