= Tendo Dag =

- Union Council
- Country: Pakistan
- Province: Khyber Pakhtunkhwa
- District: Swat

Population (2017)
  - Total: 5,384
- Time zone: UTC+5 (PST)

Tendo Dag (also spelled: Tindodag) (Pashto: تين دو ډاګ) is an administrative unit, known as Union council or Wards in Tehsil Babuzai, of Swat District in the Khyber Pakhtunkhwa province of Pakistan.

According to Khyber Pakhtunkhwa Local Government Act 2013. District Swat has 67 Wards, of which total number of Village Councils is 170, and Neighbourhood Councils is 44.

Tendo Dag is Territorial Wards, which is further divided in two Village Councils:

1. Gogdara (Village Council)
2. Tindodag (Village Council)

== See also ==
- Babuzai
- Swat District
