= Qamber, Swat =

Coordinates: 25°18′N 64°24′E

Qambar
- Union Council
- قمبر
- Interactive map of Qambar
- Country: Pakistan
- Province: Khyber Pakhtunkhwa
- District: Swat

Population (2017)
  - Total: 33,967
- Time zone: UTC+5 (PST)

Qamber (also spelled: Qambar) (Pashto and Urdu: قمبر) is a union council in Babuzai, Swat District, in the Khyber Pakhtunkhwa province of Pakistan.

According to Khyber Pakhtunkhwa Local Government Act 2013 the District of Swat has 67 Wards, of which the number of Village Councils is 170 in total, and there are also 44 Neighbourhood Councils.

Qamber is a Territorial Ward, which is further divided in three Village Councils:

1. Qamber i (Village Council)
2. Qamber ii (Village Council)
3. Gulgram (Village Council)

== See also ==
- Babuzai
- Swat District
