= Aka Maruf Bami Khel =

- Union Council
- اکا ماروف بامی خیل
- Country: Pakistan
- Province: Khyber Pakhtunkhwa
- District: Swat
- Time zone: UTC+5 (PST)

Aka Maruf Bami Khel (Urdu: اکا ماروف بامی خیل; Pashto: اکامعروف بامي خيل)is an administrative unit, known as Union council or Ward in Tehsil Babuzai, of Swat District in the Khyber Pakhtunkhwa province of Pakistan. Two clans of Babuzai namely Aka Maroof and Bami Khel live in the Union Council.

According to Khyber Pakhtunkhwa Local Government Act 2013. District Swat has 67 Wards, of which total number of Village Councils is 170, and Neighbourhood Councils is 44.

Aka Maruf Bami Khel is Territorial Ward, which is further divided in four Village Councils:

1. Bishbanr (Village Council)
2. Kass (Village Council)
3. Banjot (Village Council)
4. Sar Sardarai (Village Council)

== Shangla puran towa ==
- Babuzai
- Manglawar
- Swat District
