= Malakanan Landakass =

Malakanan
- Union Council
- ملکانان لنڈے کس
- Country: Pakistan
- Province: Khyber Pakhtunkhwa
- District: Swat
- Time zone: UTC+5 (PST)

Malakanan / Landikass (Urdu: ملکانان لنڈے کس; Pashto: ملکانان لنډيکس)is an administrative unit, known as Union council or Ward in Tehsil Babuzai, of Swat District in the Khyber Pakhtunkhwa province of Pakistan.

According to Khyber Pakhtunkhwa Local Government Act 2013. District Swat has 67 Wards, of which total number of Village Councils is 170, and Neighbourhood Council Neighbourhood Councils is 44.

Malakanan / Landikass is Territorial Ward, which is further divided in two Neighbourhood Councils:

1. Malakanan (Neighbourhood Council)
2. Landikass (Neighbourhood Council)

== See also ==
- Babuzai
- Swat District
