= Gulkada =

Coordinates: 34°46′N 72°22′E

- Union Council
- Interactive map of Gulkada
- Country: Pakistan
- Province: Khyber Pakhtunkhwa
- District: Swat

Government
  - Anp: bakht zada

Area
  - Total: 5 km^{2} (1.9 sq mi)

Population (2021)
  - Total: 11,720
- Time zone: UTC+5 (PST)

Gulkada (Pashto: ،ګلکده) is an administrative unit, known as Union council in Tehsil Babuzai, or Wards of Swat District in the Khyber Pakhtunkhwa province of Pakistan.

According to Khyber Pakhtunkhwa Local Government Act 2013. District Swat has 67 Wards, of which total number of Village Councils is 170, and Neighbourhood Councils is 44.

Gulkada is Territorial Ward, which is further divided in three Neighbourhood Councils:

1. Panr (Neighbourhood Council)
2. Gulkada (Neighbourhood Council)
3. College Colony (Neighbourhood Council)

Panr: Panr is one of the important areas of Union council Gulkada. During the Local Bodies Elections, Mr. Riaz Khan, Awami National Party (Resident of Panr) elected as Nazim and served the people of the Union Council Gulkada.

== See also ==
- Babuzai
- Swat District
