= Dangram =

Coordinates: 34°45′N 72°24′E

- Union Council
- دنګرام دنگرام
- Interactive map of Dangram
- Country: Pakistan
- Province: Khyber Pakhtunkhwa
- District: Swat

Government
  - (pti: fazal akbar
  - nazim: fazal akbar

Area
  - Total: 5.35 km^{2} (2.07 sq mi)

Population (2017)
  - Total: 9,884
- Time zone: UTC+5 (PST)

Dangram Sangota (Urdu: دنگرام; Pashto: ،دنګرام سنګوټه) is an administrative unit, known as Union council in Tehsil Babuzai, or Wards of Swat District in the Khyber Pakhtunkhwa province of Pakistan.

According to Khyber Pakhtunkhwa Local Government Act 2013. District Swat has 67 Wards, of which total number of Village Councils is 170, and Neighbourhood Councils is 44.

Dangram Sangota is Territorial Ward, which is further divided in three Village Councils:

1. Dangram (Village Council)
2. Lowey Banr, Ajrang (Village Council)
3. Sangota (Village Council)

== See also ==
- Babuzai
- Swat District
