= Islampur, Swat =

Salampur
- Union Council
- Islampur
- Country: Pakistan
- Province: Khyber Pakhtunkhwa
- District: Swat

Population (2020)
  - Total: 30,000+
- Time zone: UTC+5 (PST)
- Website: Islampur on Facebook

Islampur (Pashto: اسلام پور), also called Salampur, is an administrative unit, known as Union council or Ward in Tehsil Babuzai, of Swat District in the Khyber Pakhtunkhwa province of Pakistan. It is at 10 kilometres (6.2 mi) from the main city of Mingora, and Marghuzar is in its neighbourhood. Islampur is famous for its woolen products and shawls. It is adjacent to Saidu Sharif.

According to Khyber Pakhtunkhwa Local Government Act 2013, District Swat has 214 wards, of which the total number of village councils is 170, and neighborhoods is 44.

Islampur is a territorial ward, which is further divided into three village councils: Islampur, Kokrai / Chitawar, and Marghuzar.
