= Malook Abad, Swat =

Malook Abad
- Union Council
- Country: Pakistan
- Province: Khyber Pakhtunkhwa
- District: Swat
- Time zone: UTC+5 (PST)

Malook Abad (Pashto: ملوک آباد)is an administrative unit, known as Ward in Tehsil Babuzai, of Swat District in the Khyber Pakhtunkhwa province of Pakistan.

According to Khyber Pakhtunkhwa Local Government Act 2013, District Swat has 67 Wards, of which the total number of Village Councils is 170, and Neighbourhood Councils is 44.

Malook Abad is a Territorial Ward, which is further divided in two Neighbourhood Councils:

1. Malook Abad No. 1 (Neighbourhood Council)
2. Malook Abad No. 2 (Neighbourhood Council)

== Malook Abad No. 1 ==
Neighbourhood Council Malook Abad No. 1 consists of:

- (Block No. 1) Mohallah Ishaq, Malook Abad, Mohallah Gul Shaheed, Mohallah Sher zada, Mohallah Raza abad, Qazi baba, Aziz Abad, Malook Abad Mingora.
- (Block No. 2) Mohallah Raja abad, Zamarud kan, Qazi baba, Azizabad, Malookabad Mingora,
- (Block No. 3) Mohallah Raja Abad Mingora, Qazi baba Mingora.

Population of Neighbourhood Council Malook Abad No. 1 is 6860, and number of General Seats in Local Bodies Election is 8.

== Malook Abad No. 2 ==
Neighbourhood Council Malook Abad No. 2 consists of:

- (Block No. 4) Malookabad, Cheena Masjid Malook abad.
- (Block No. 5) Mohallah Khalqdar khan, Mohallah Khaliqabad, Mohallah Malookabad

Population of Neighbourhood Council Malook Abad No. 2 is 7724, and number of General Seats in Local Bodies Election is 9.

== See also ==
- Babuzai
- Swat District
