= Saidu Sharif Stupa =

Ancient Buddhist site in Pakistan

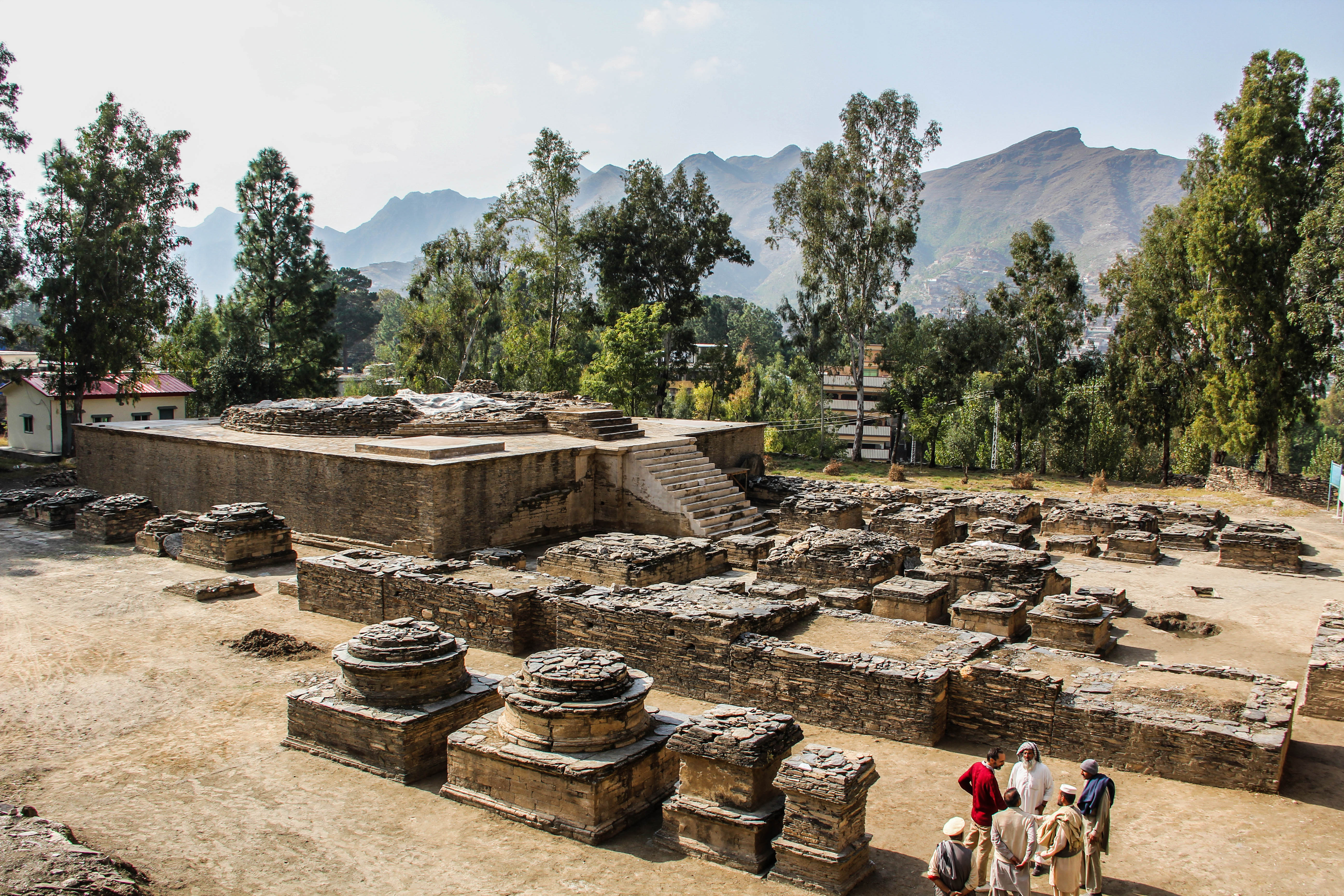
- The lower terrace with the main stupa

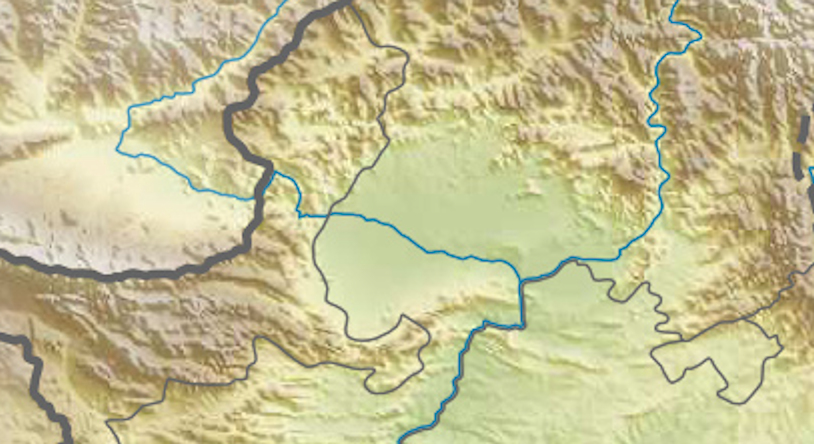
- Location within Pakistan Location within Gandhara

Religion
- Affiliation: Buddhism
- Region: Gandhara
- Ecclesiastical or organizational status: Stupa ruins
- Year consecrated: 1st–5th century CE
- Status: Artifacts removed

Location
- Location: Pakistan
- Interactive map of Saidu Sharif Stupa
- Coordinates: 34.757091°N 72.362172°E

The Saidu Sharif Stupa, excavated under the name Saidu Sharif I, is a Buddhist stupa located near the city of Saidu Sharif, at the foot of the mountains that separate the river valley Saidu from that of the river Jambil, in the Swat District of Khyber Pakhtunkhwa, Pakistan. The sacred area consists of two terraces built on the slope of the hill, through a cut in the rock on the north side. Artificial terracing includes one stūpa, surrounded by smaller monuments, and a monastery.

== Excavations ==
The excavations were initiated by the Italian Archaeological Mission in 1963 and ended in 1982, with a pause between 1966 and 1977. The first excavation campaign investigated the lower terrace with the main stūpa, while the upper terrace with the monastery it was brought to light during the second campaign.

The lower terrace (called "Terrace of the Stupas") has a larger stūpa (Main Stupa) surrounded by other minor monuments: stūpas, viharas and columns. Of the Main Stupa is preserved the structure with a square plan up to the first cylindrical body, with a stairway on the north side; of the harmikā and of the umbrellas are preserved some remains found near the stūpa. One of the two cylindrical bodies of the monument was adorned with a frieze figured in green schist while at the four corners of the top of the rectangular body were four columns on a pedestal with a lion figure crouched on top.

The life phase of the sanctuary of Saidu Sharif I was divided by archaeologists in three periods, during which time we pass from a symmetrical arrangement of the monuments (first period, between 25 BCE and the end of the 1st century) to a progressive crowding of the Terrace of the Stupa, followed by an extension of the terrace itself (second and third periods, respectively 2nd–3rd century CE and 4th–5th century CE). The three construction periods were also highlighted on the upper terrace; the monastery underwent an extension followed by a reduction to the original dimensions in the third period, which testifies to the decline of the entire sacred area.

== Gallery of images ==
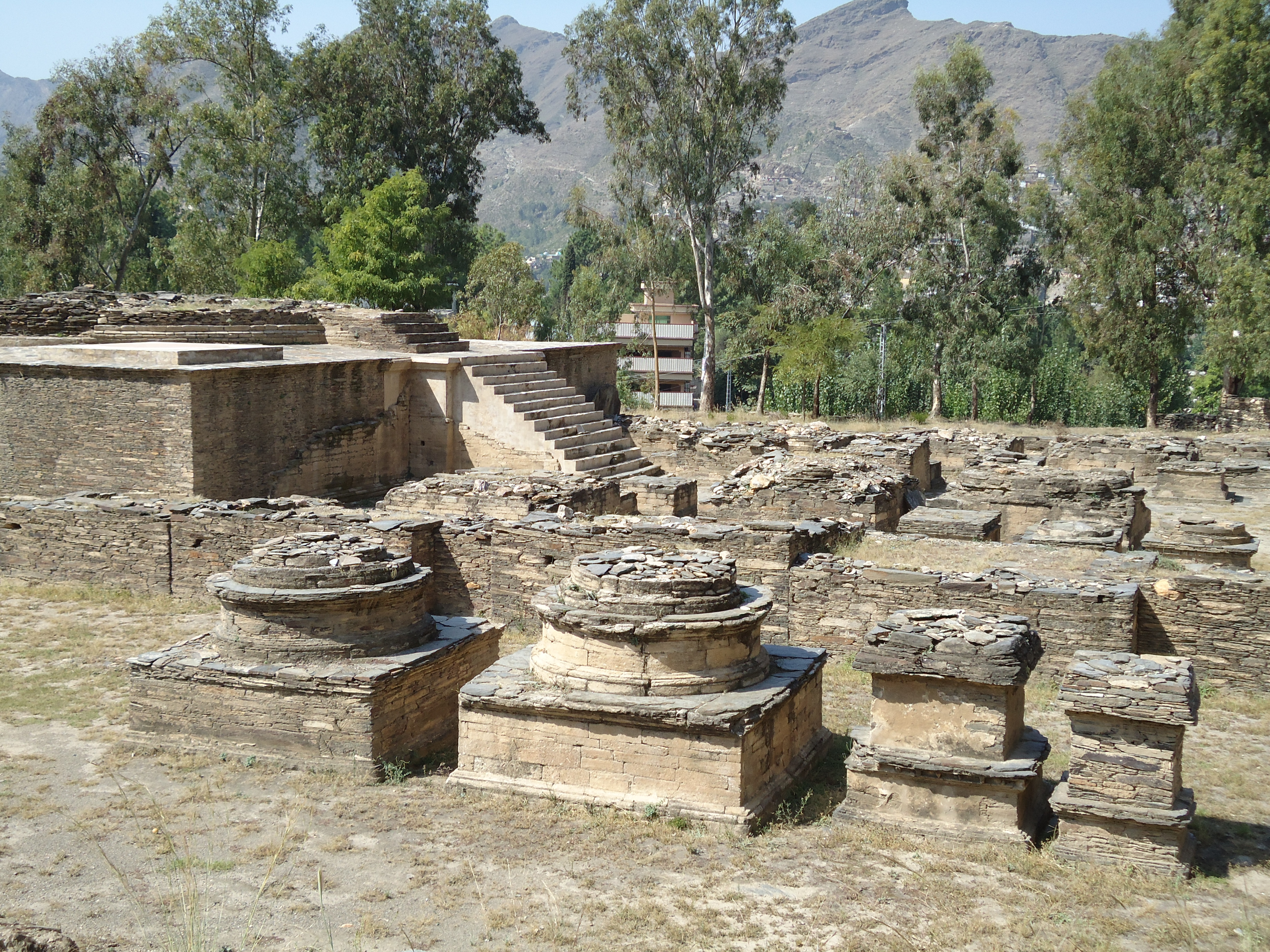
Saidu Stupa- west view

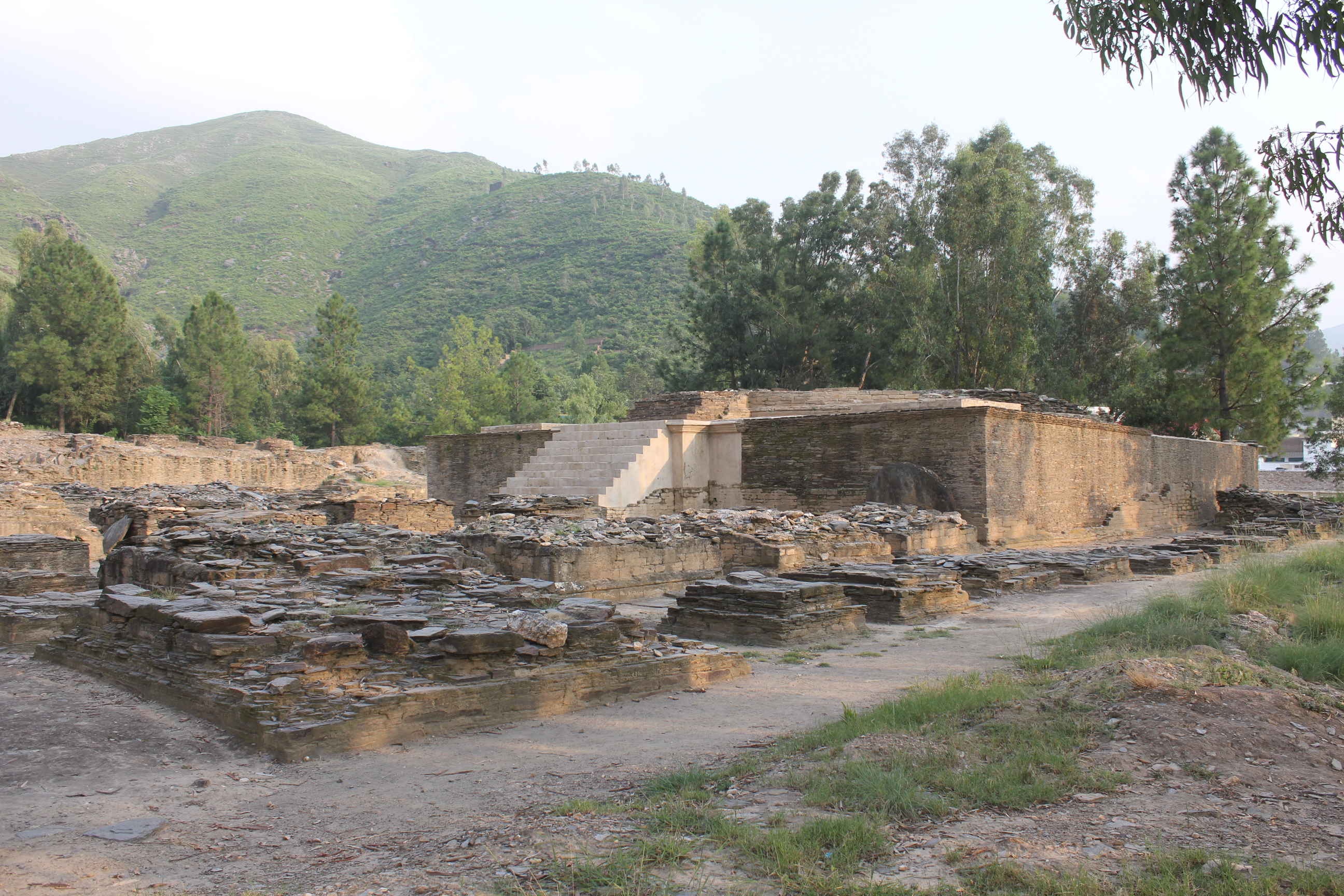
General view of the votive stupas and main stupa of Saidu Sharif

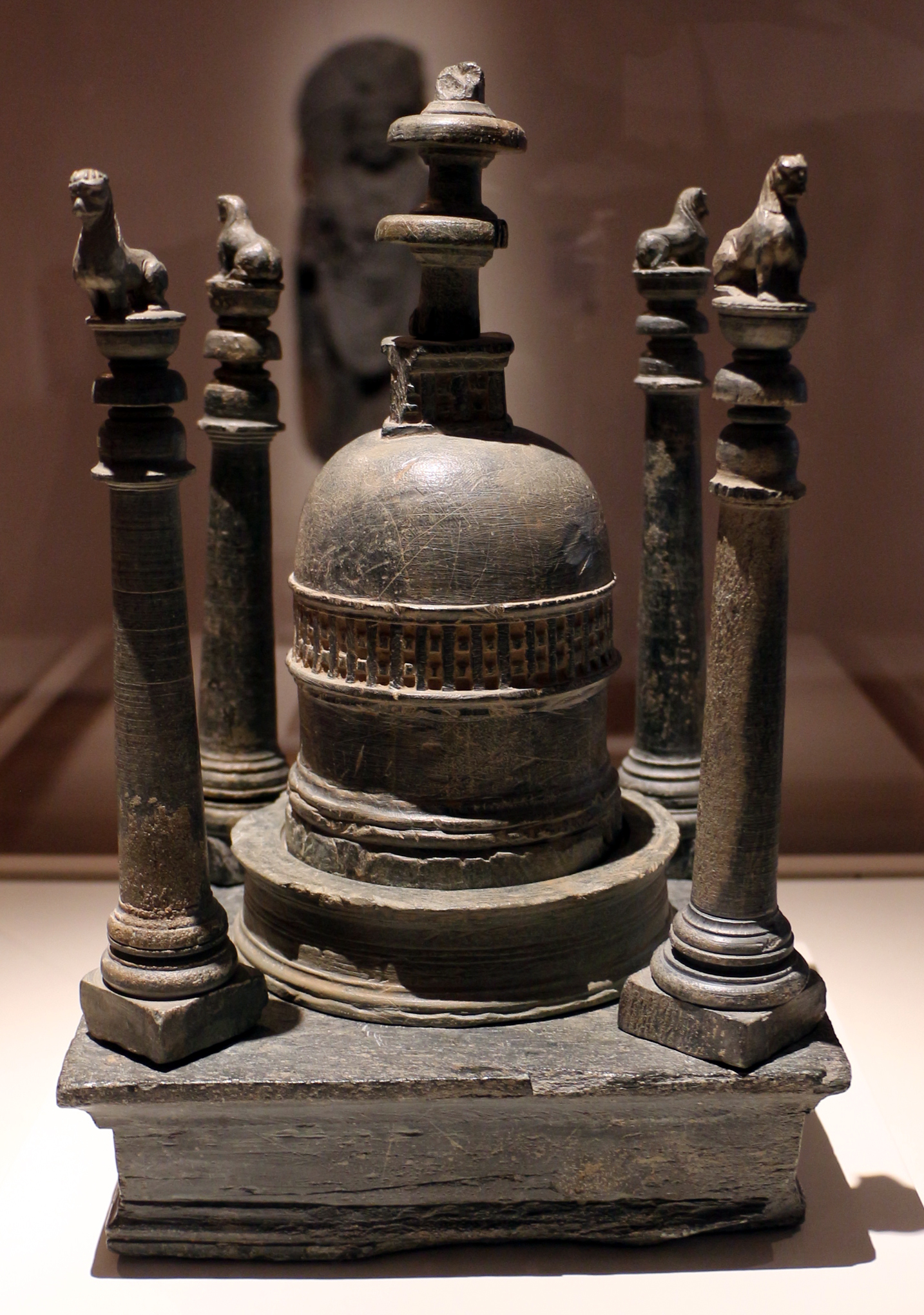
A model resembling the Saidu Sharif stupa, with square base and four columns.

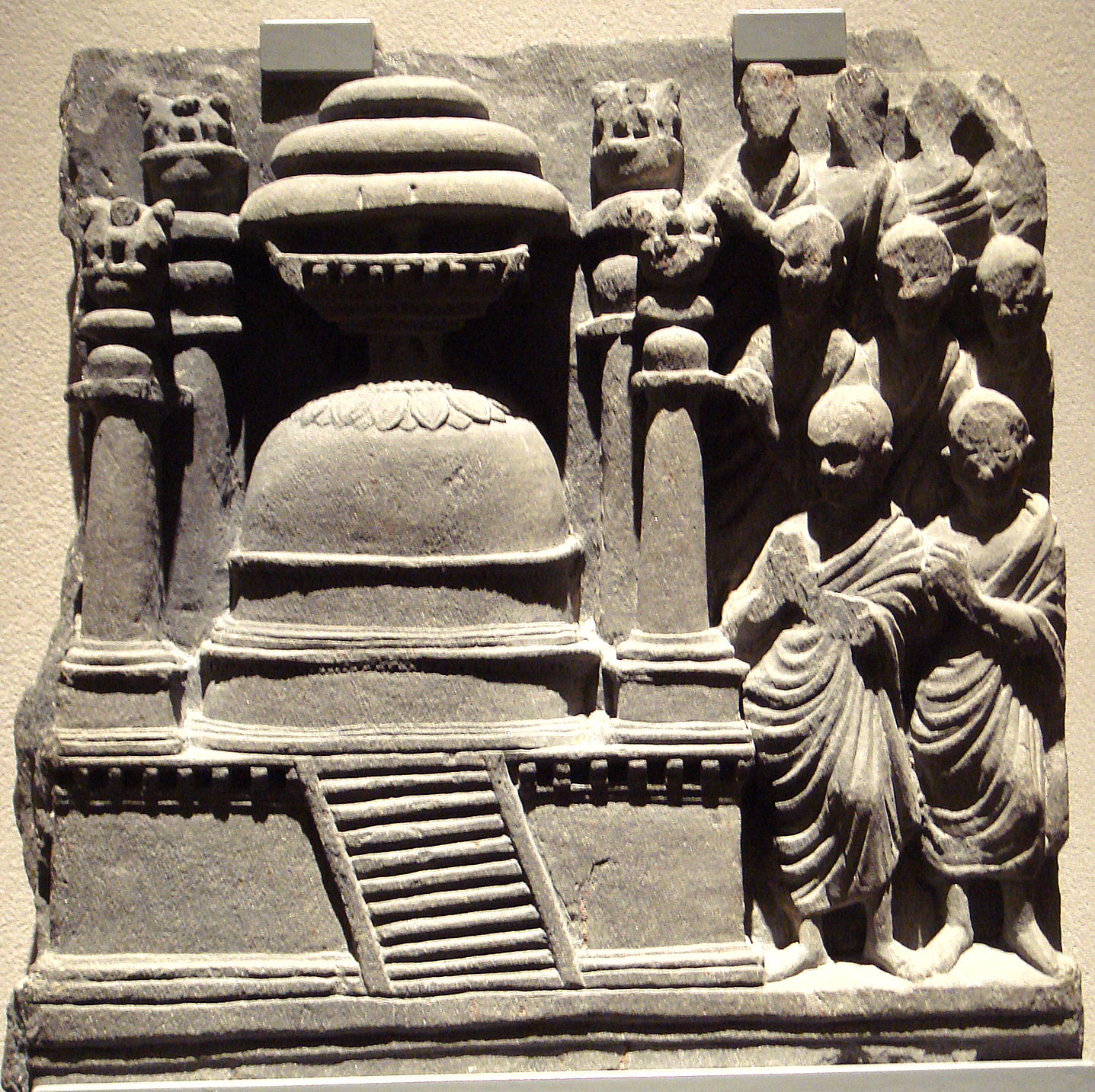
Another such model, with flight of stairs.

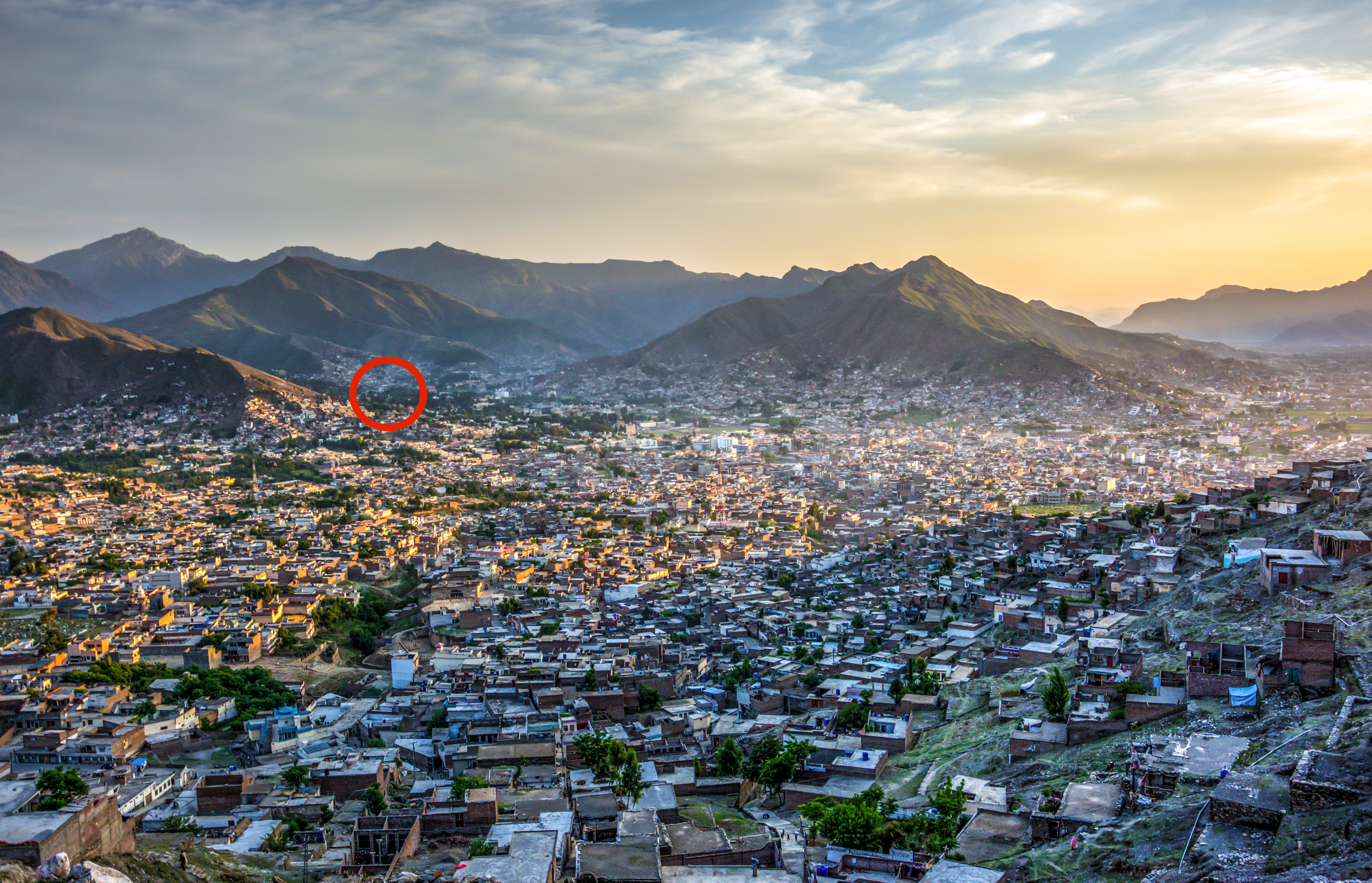
Saidu Sharif stupa location, seen from the city of Mingora.

== Bibliography ==
- Pierfrancesco Callieri (edited by), Italian Archaeological Mission (IsMEO), Pakistan, Swat, 1956-1981. Documentary Exhibition , Rome, IsMEO, 1982.
- Pierfrancesco Callieri, "The monastery of the sacred Buddhist area of Saidu Sharif I (Swat)", Excavations and archaeological research of the years 1976-1979 (Quaderni de "Scientific research", CNR, 112) , 1985, pp. 327–39.
- Pierfrancesco Callieri, Saidu Sharif I (Swat, Pakistan). 1. The Buddhist Sacred Area. The Monastery , vol. XXIII, Report and Memoirs 1, Rome, IsMEO, 1989.
- Pierfrancesco Callieri and Anna Filigenzi (edited by), The master of Saidu Sharif. At the origins of Gandhara art (Catalog of the exhibition, Rome 2002), Rome, 2002.
- Domenico Faccenna, Saidu Sharif I (Swat, Pakistan). 2. The Buddhist Sacred Area. The Stūpa Terrace , vol. XXIII, Report and Memoirs 2, Rome, IsMEO, 1995.
- Domenico Faccenna, The figurative frieze of the Main Stupa in the sacred Buddhist area of Saidu Sharif I (Swat, Pakistan) , vol. XXVIII, Report and Memoirs, Rome, IsMEO, 2001.
