= Banjot, Swat =

Pakistani

Coordinates: 34°46′N 72°28′E

Banjot بنجوټ
- Village Council
- Interactive map of Banjot بنجوټ
- Country: Pakistan
- Province: Khyber Pakhtunkhwa
- District: Swat

Population (2017)
  - Total: 4,748
- Time zone: UTC+5 (PST)

Banjot (Pashto: بنجوټ) is an administrative unit, known as Village Council, within Union Council Aka Maruf Bami Khel in Tehsil Babuzai, of Swat District in Khyber Pakhtunkhwa, Pakistan.

According to Khyber Pakhtunkhwa Local Government Act 2013, Swat District has 214 Wards, comprising 170 Village Councils and 44 Neighbourhood Councils.

Aka Maruf Bami Khel is a territorial ward further divided in the four Village Councils of Banjot, Sar Sardarai, Kass and Bishbanr.

According to Election Commission of Pakistan, Banjot consists of: - PC Sar Sardaray (Mauza Banjot) - PC Sar Sardaray (Mauza Goratai)

The population of Village Council Banjot is 5,540, and it has seven general seats in the Local Bodies Election.
