= Sar Sardaray, Swat =

Pakistani administrative unit

Sar Sardaray
- Village Council
- Country: Pakistan
- Province: Khyber Pakhtunkhwa
- District: Swat

Population (2017)
  - Total: 5,026
- Time zone: UTC+5 (PST)

Sar Sardaray (also spelled: Sarsardaray)(Pashto: سرسردارے) is an administrative unit, known as Village Council in Union Council Aka Maruf Bami Khel in Tehsil Babuzai, of Swat District in the Khyber Pakhtunkhwa province of Pakistan.

According to Khyber Pakhtunkhwa Local Government Act 2013. District Swat has 214 Wards, of which total number of Village Councils is 170, and Neighborhood is 44.

Aka Maruf Bami Khel is Territorial Ward, which is further divided in four Village Councils: Sar Sardarai, Banjot, Kass and Bishbanr.

According to Election Commission of Pakistan, Sar Sardaray consists of:

- PC Sar Sardaray (Mauza Sar Sardaray)

Population of Village Council Sar Sardaray is 5026, and no of General Seats in Local Bodies Election is 6.

== See also ==
- Aka Maruf Bami Khel
- Babuzai
- Manglawar
- Swat District
