= Bishbanr, Swat =

Coordinates: 34°48′N 72°31′E

Bishbanr
- Village Council
- Interactive map of Bishbanr
- Country: Pakistan
- Province: Khyber Pakhtunkhwa
- District: Swat

Population (2017)
  - Total: 12,146
- Time zone: UTC+5 (PST)

Bishbanr (Pashto: بشبنړ)is an administrative unit, known as Village Council in Union Council Aka Maruf Bami Khel in Tehsil Babuzai, of Swat District in the Khyber Pakhtunkhwa province of Pakistan.

According to Khyber Pakhtunkhwa Local Government Act 2013. District Swat has 214 Wards, of which the total number of Village Councils is 170, and Neighborhood is 44.

Aka Maruf Bami Khel is Territorial Ward, which is further divided in four Village Councils:

Bishbanr, Banjot, Kass and Sar Sardarai.

According to Election Commission of Pakistan, Bishbanr consists of:

1. PC Bishbanr (Mauza Kuz Qila)
2. PC Bishbanr (Mauza Bishbanr)

Population of Village Council Bishbanr is 5879, and no of General Seats in Local Bodies Election is 7.

== See also ==
- Aka Maruf Bami Khel
- Babuzai
- Manglawar
- Swat District
