= Dangram, Swat =

Dangram (Village Council)
- Village Council
- Country: Pakistan
- Province: Khyber Pakhtunkhwa
- District: Swat
- Time zone: UTC+5 (PST)

Dangram (Pashto: دنګرام) is an administrative unit, known as Village Council in Union Council or Ward Dangram in Tehsil Babuzai, of Swat District in the Khyber Pakhtunkhwa province of Pakistan.

According to Khyber Pakhtunkhwa Local Government Act 2013. District Swat has 214 Wards, of which the total number of Village Councils is 170, and Neighborhood is 44.

According to Election Commission of Pakistan, Dangram consists of:

1. PC Mingora (Mauza Dangram)

Population of Village Council Dangram is 5229, and no of General Seats in Local Bodies Election is 7.

== See also ==
- Dangram
- Babuzai
- Swat District
