= Kass, Swat =

Coordinates: 34°32′N 72°43′E

Kass Manglawar
- Village Council
- Interactive map of Kass Manglawar
- Country: Pakistan
- Province: Khyber Pakhtunkhwa
- District: Swat

Population (2017)
  - Total: 3,134
- Time zone: UTC+5 (PST)

Kass (also called Kas or Kass Manglawar; Pashto: کس) is a Village Council in Union Council Aka Maruf Bami Khel in Babuzai Tehsil, Swat District in the Khyber Pakhtunkhwa province of Pakistan.

According to Khyber Pakhtunkhwa Local Government Act 2013, Swat District has 214 Wards, of which the total number of Village Councils is 170, and Neighborhood is 44.

Aka Maruf Bami Khel is a Territorial Ward, which is divided into four Village Councils: Kass, Sar Sardaray, Banjot, and Bishbanr.

According to the Election Commission of Pakistan, Kass consists of:

- PC Bishbanr (Mauza Kass)

Kass has five general seats in the local bodies election.

== See also ==
- Aka Maruf Bami Khel
- Babuzai
- Manglawar
