= Dardiyal, Swat =

Dardiyal
- Union Council
- Country: Pakistan
- Province: Khyber Pakhtunkhwa
- District: Swat

Population (2017)
  - Total: 19,090
- Time zone: UTC+5 (PST)

Dardiyal (Pashto: درديال) is an administrative unit, known as Ward in Tehsil Kabal, of Swat District in the Khyber Pakhtunkhwa province of Pakistan.

According to Khyber Pakhtunkhwa Local Government Act 2013. District Swat has 67 Wards, of which the total number of Village Councils is 170, and Neighbourhood Councils is 44.

Dardiyal is Territorial Ward, which is further divided in four Village Councils:

1. Dardiyal No. 1 (Village Council)
2. Dardiyal No. 2 (Village Council)
3. Bara Samai (Village Council)
4. Tall (Village Council)

== Dardiyal No. 1 ==
Village Council Dardiyal No. 1 consist of:

- PC Dardiyal (Mairai, Khaadi, Aryanai, Kas No. 1, Gatkow, Pacha Kalay, Gul Banda, Bago)

Population of Village Council Dardiyal No. 1 is 5600, and number of General Seats in Local Bodies Election is 7.

== Dardiyal No. 2 ==
Village Council Dardiyal No. 2 consist of:

- PC Dardiyal (Qazi abad, Choor, Smaste, Penawrai, Dardial, Kamkhlai, Kas No. 2, Kal Maira)

Population of Village Council Dardiyal No. 2 is 4429, and number of General Seats in Local Bodies Election is 7.

== Bara Samai ==
Village Council Bara Samai consist of:

- PC Bara Samai (Mauza Bara Samai)

Population of Village Council Bara Samai is 8660, and number of General Seats in Local Bodies Election is 9.

== Tall ==
Village Council Tall consist of:

- PC Bara Samai (Mauza Tall)

Population of Village Council Tall is 8660, and number of General Seats in Local Bodies Election is 9.

== See also ==
- Kabal, Tehsil
- Manglawar
- Swat District
