= Jambil =

Coordinates: 34°43′N 72°27′E

- Village Council
- Interactive map of Jambil
- Country: Pakistan
- Province: Khyber Pakhtunkhwa
- District: Swat

Population (2017)
  - Total: 16,128
- Time zone: UTC+5 (PST)

Jambil (Pashto: جامبل) is a Village Council in the Kokarai Union Council in Babuzai Tehsil, Swat District, Khyber Pakhtunkhwa, Pakistan.

According to Khyber Pakhtunkhwa Local Government Act 2013. Swat District has 214 Wards, of which 170 are Village Councils and 44 are Neighborhood.

According to Election Commission of Pakistan, Jambil consists of:

- PC Jambil (Mauza Jambil)

The population of Village Council Jambil is 16128, and no of General Seats in Local Bodies Election is 9.

== See also ==
- Kokarai
- Babuzai
- Swat District
