= Khwaja Khel (Khwajgan) =

Khwaja Khel / Khwajgan ( خواجه خېل (خواجګان (Pashto),
Khwaja Khel خواجه خېل
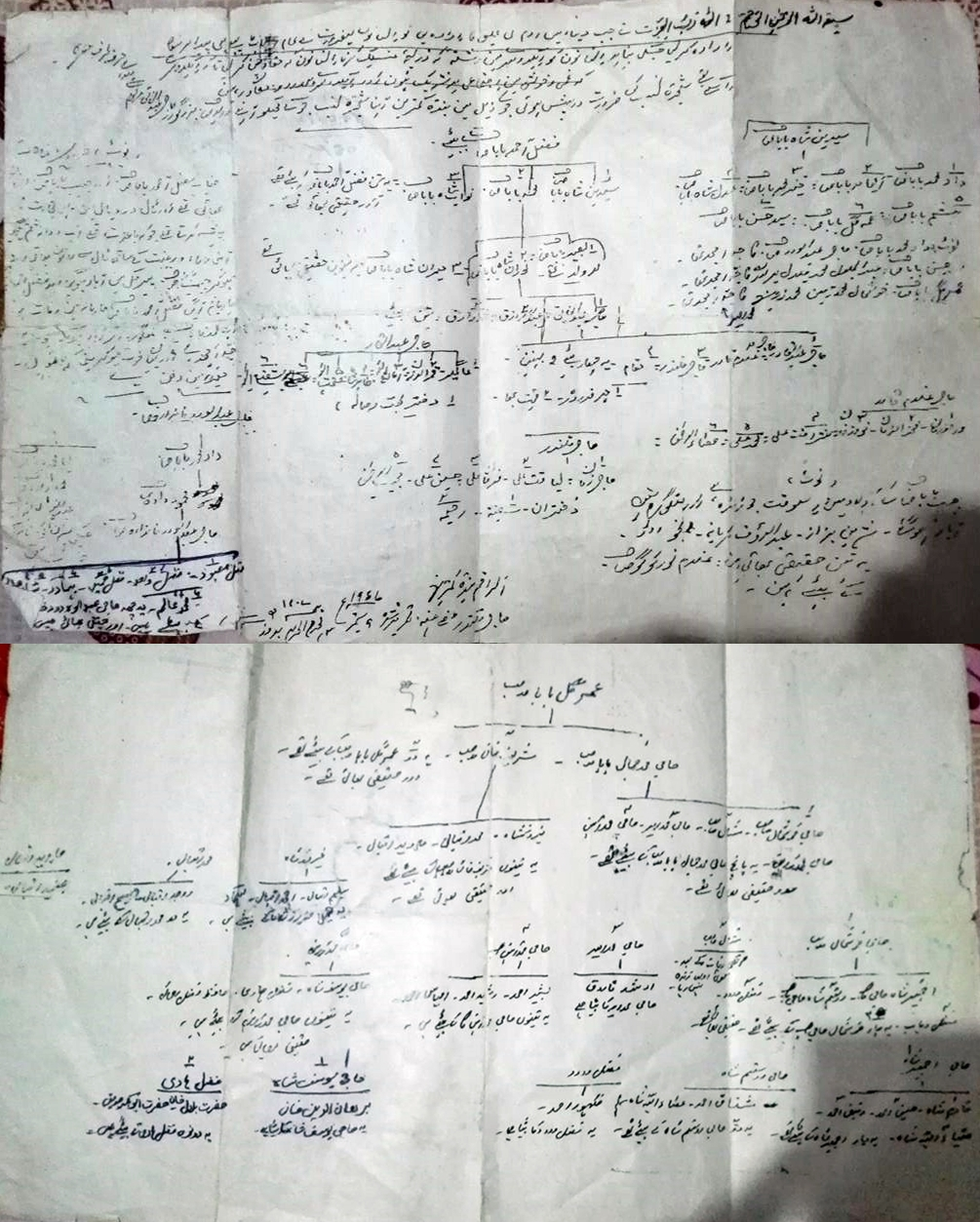
- (Khwaja Khel خواجه خېل) Khwaja Khel خواجه خېل (including those of ancestral descent)

Regions with significant populations
- Primarily , Swat State and recently Pakistan, Swat District

Languages
- The Yusufzai dialect of Pashto (Pakhto پښتو) (Native)

Religion
- Islam (Sunni)

Khwaja Khel (Pashto: خواجه خېل), also known as Khwajgan is a clan or family settled in different parts of Swat valley, including Bara Bandai, Mingora, Barikot, Charbagh and Dakorak. Additionally, some Khwajgan families can also be found in areas like Zhob Loralai and Tank districts of Balochistan and Khyber Pakhtunkhwa.

== Origin ==
The origins of the Khwajakhel family are traditionally situated within Pashtun genealogical narratives connected to the Swat Valley. Recent population-genetic research provides broader context for these traditions by situating Pashtun ancestry within long-term demographic continuity in the Swat–Gandhara region rather than recent large-scale migration.

Genome-wide ancient DNA studies of South and Central Asia demonstrate that populations of the Swat Valley during the Bronze Age and Iron Age were primarily descended from Indus-Periphery populations, themselves formed through admixture between ancient Iranian-related agriculturalists and indigenous South Asian groups. These populations later absorbed Steppe-derived Indo-Iranic ancestry during the Late Bronze Age, a genetic pattern that persists among modern Pashtun populations of northern Pakistan and eastern Afghanistan.

Ancient DNA recovered from archaeological sites in the Swat Valley, including Iron Age and early historic burials, shows strong genetic continuity with earlier Bronze Age inhabitants, suggesting population stability rather than large-scale demographic replacement. Modern Pashtuns cluster closely with these ancient Swat Valley populations in comparative genetic analyses, indicating deep regional roots predating medieval historical movements.

Autosomal DNA modeling of Khwajakhel family members using genome-wide reference datasets aligns with this broader Pashtun genetic profile, showing dominant Indus-Periphery ancestry combined with moderate Indo-Iranic Steppe ancestry. Distance-based comparisons consistently place Khwajakhel samples closest to Pashtun populations from northern Pakistan and eastern Afghanistan, regions historically associated with Swat.

Genetic analyses do not support claims of recent descent from Arab, Greek, Turkic, or Central Asian nomadic populations. Minor West Asian, Caucasus, or Anatolian components observed in some models are interpreted as deep prehistoric ancestry already present in Indus-Periphery populations rather than evidence of historical migration.

While Pashtun oral traditions, including Yusufzai migration narratives, describe movements into the Swat Valley during the late medieval period, genetic and archaeological evidence suggests that many Pashtun lineages—such as the Khwajakhel—share ancestry with populations established in Swat long before these events. As with other Pashtun groups, tribal names and honorifics likely reflect social, political, or religious developments rather than discrete biological origins.

Overall, genetic evidence supports the interpretation of the Khwajakhel family as a Pashtun lineage with deep historical roots in the Swat Valley, shaped primarily by ancient Indo-Iranic population processes rather than recent external migration.

== Settlements ==
In the 18th century, the Khwajgan settled in the village of Dardiyal in Kabal Tehsil and engaged in trade and business. Over time, the Khwajakhel relocated to Pir Kaley, Matta. Subsequently, they moved to Dakorak, Charbagh in Bara Bandai, where the family acquired land in the villages they inhabited.

In the 20th century, some members of the Khwajgan migrated from Bajaur Agency and settled in areas of upper Swat, including Sijband and Shokhdarra in Matta Tehsil.

== Recent settlement ==
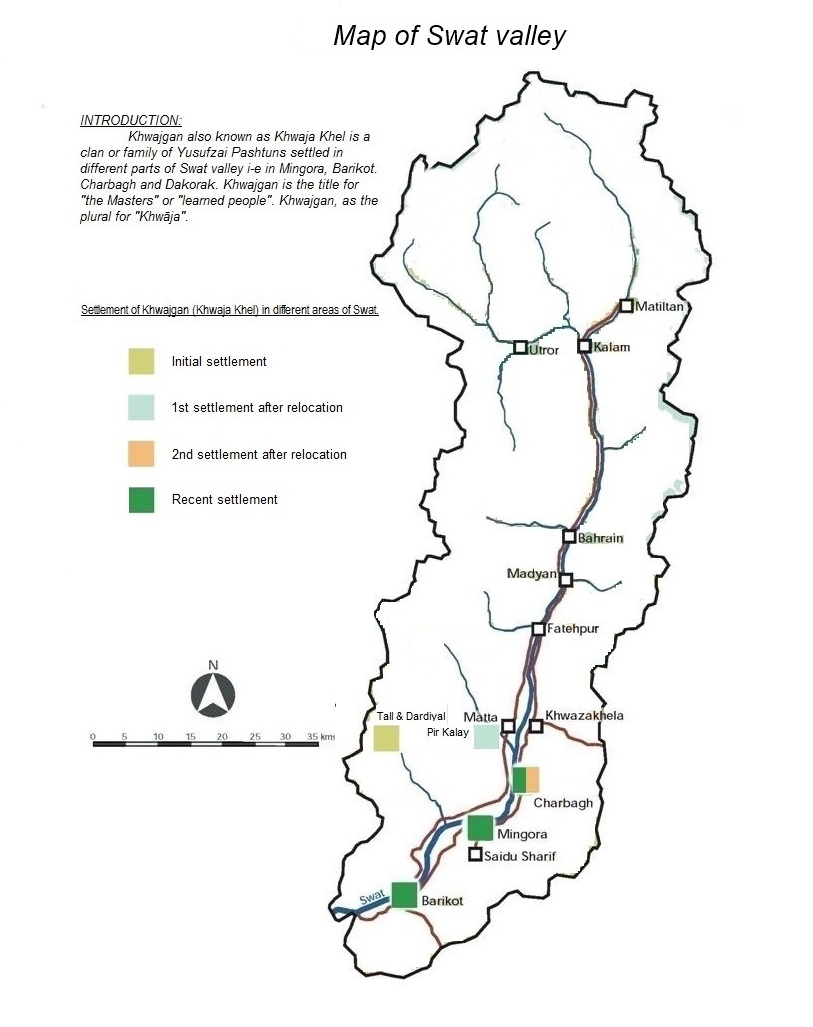
Map of Swat including Khwaja Khel settlement

The first known people of the Khwajgan family at Swat were Fazal Ahmad Shah and Habib Shah. Fazal Ahmad Shah had three sons Sayyaden Shah, Nawab Shah, and Muhammad Shah who are now descended to almost eight generations. In the 20th century, after the urbanization of The Yusafzai State of Swat due to their business needs, Khwajgan settled in different towns and cities of Swat. Mostly in Bara Bandai, Mingora, Sangota, Charbagh, Barikot, Matta, Sijband.

== See also ==
- Pashtun
- Pashtun tribes
- Yusufzai
- Afghan

== Bibliography ==
- Masters Of Wisdom: An Esoteric History of the Spiritual Unfolding of Life on This Planet by J.G. Bennett, ISBN 0-87728-466-0
- Masters Of Wisdom of Central Asia by Hasan Shusud, ISBN 0-900306-93-9
- The Teachers of Gurdjieff by Rafael Lefort, ISBN 0-87728-213-7
- The Naqshbandi Sufi Way, History and Guidebook of the Saints of the Golden Chain by Shaykh Muhammad Hisham Kabbani, Kazi Publications, USA (1995), ISBN 0-934905-34-7
