= Saidu Sharif =

Pakistani town

Saidu Sharif سيدو شريف
- City
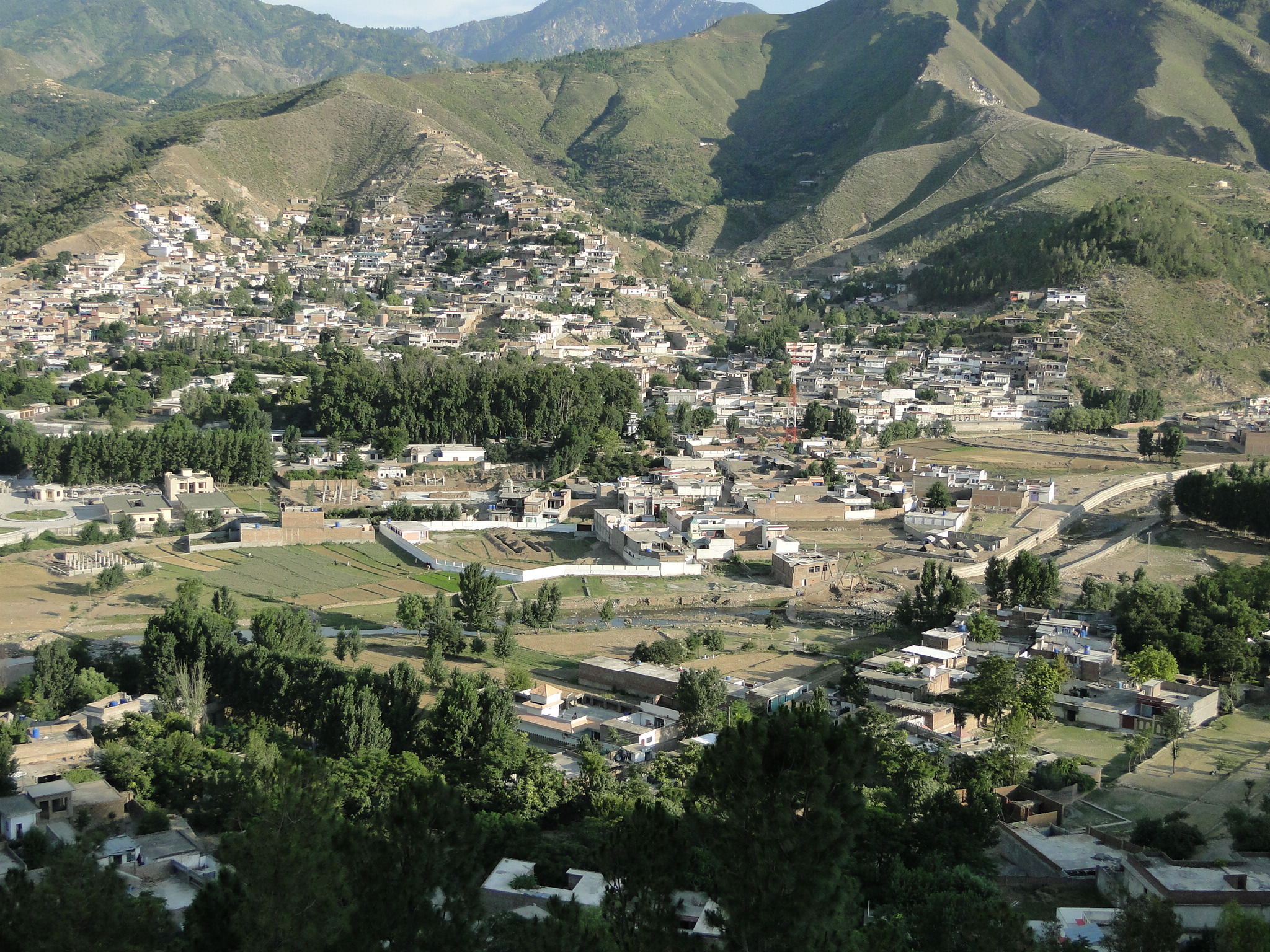
- View of Saidu Sharif

- Location within Pakistan Saidu Sharif (Pakistan)
- Coordinates: 34°45′0″N 72°21′26″E
- Country: Pakistan
- Province: Khyber Pakhtunkhwa
- District: Swat District
- Elevation: 970 m (3,180 ft)

Population (2017)
  - Total: 65,000
- Time zone: UTC+5 (PST)
- Postal code: 19200

Saidū Sharīf (Urdu, Pashto: سيدو شریف; Urdu pronunciation: [saj.duː.ʃə.ɾiːf], Pashto pronunciation: [saj.d̪u.ʃa.rip]), also known as Saidu Baba, or simply as Saidu, is the capital of the Swat district, Khyber Pakhtunkhwa, Pakistan. The city also serves as the capital of the Malakand Division. It was named after Saidu Baba, a prominent leader of the former state of Swat.

Saidu Sharif is the hub of several official buildings, and archaeological sites such as the Swat Museum, the mausoleum of Saidu Baba, Royal residential palace of the former Wali-e-Swat, and the archaeological remains of the Butkara Buddhist Stupa.

== Etymology ==
The older name of Saidu Sharif was Baligram. In 1835, Akhund of Swat, a Sufi saint commonly known as Saidu Baba, a Gujjar settled here, renaming the city to Saidu Sharif.

== Climate ==
Saidu Sharif has a hot-summer Mediterranean climate (Csa) under the Köppen climate classification. The average annual temperature in Saidu Sharif is 19.3 °C, while the annual precipitation average is 894 mm. November is the driest month with 22 mm of precipitation, while August is the wettest one with average precipitation of 134 mm.

June is the hottest month of the year with an average temperature of 29.2 °C while January is the coldest one with an average temperature of 7.5 °C.

Climate data for Saidu Sharif
Month	Jan	Feb	Mar	Apr	May	Jun	Jul	Aug	Sep	Oct	Nov	Dec	Year
Mean daily maximum °C (°F)	13.0 (55.4)	15.9 (60.6)	20.3 (68.5)	25.8 (78.4)	31.8 (89.2)	36.8 (98.2)	35.4 (95.7)	33.6 (92.5)	32.3 (90.1)	28.0 (82.4)	21.8 (71.2)	15.3 (59.5)	25.8 (78.5)
Daily mean °C (°F)	7.5 (45.5)	10.3 (50.5)	14.3 (57.7)	19.3 (66.7)	24.6 (76.3)	29.2 (84.6)	29.0 (84.2)	27.7 (81.9)	25.6 (78.1)	20.4 (68.7)	14.5 (58.1)	9.3 (48.7)	19.3 (66.8)
Mean daily minimum °C (°F)	2.1 (35.8)	4.8 (40.6)	8.3 (46.9)	12.8 (55.0)	17.4 (63.3)	21.6 (70.9)	22.6 (72.7)	21.9 (71.4)	18.9 (66.0)	12.9 (55.2)	7.3 (45.1)	3.4 (38.1)	12.8 (55.1)
Average precipitation mm (inches)	81 (3.2)	98 (3.9)	125 (4.9)	89 (3.5)	45 (1.8)	30 (1.2)	130 (5.1)	134 (5.3)	64 (2.5)	48 (1.9)	22 (0.9)	28 (1.1)	894 (35.3)
Source: Climate-Data.org

== Education ==
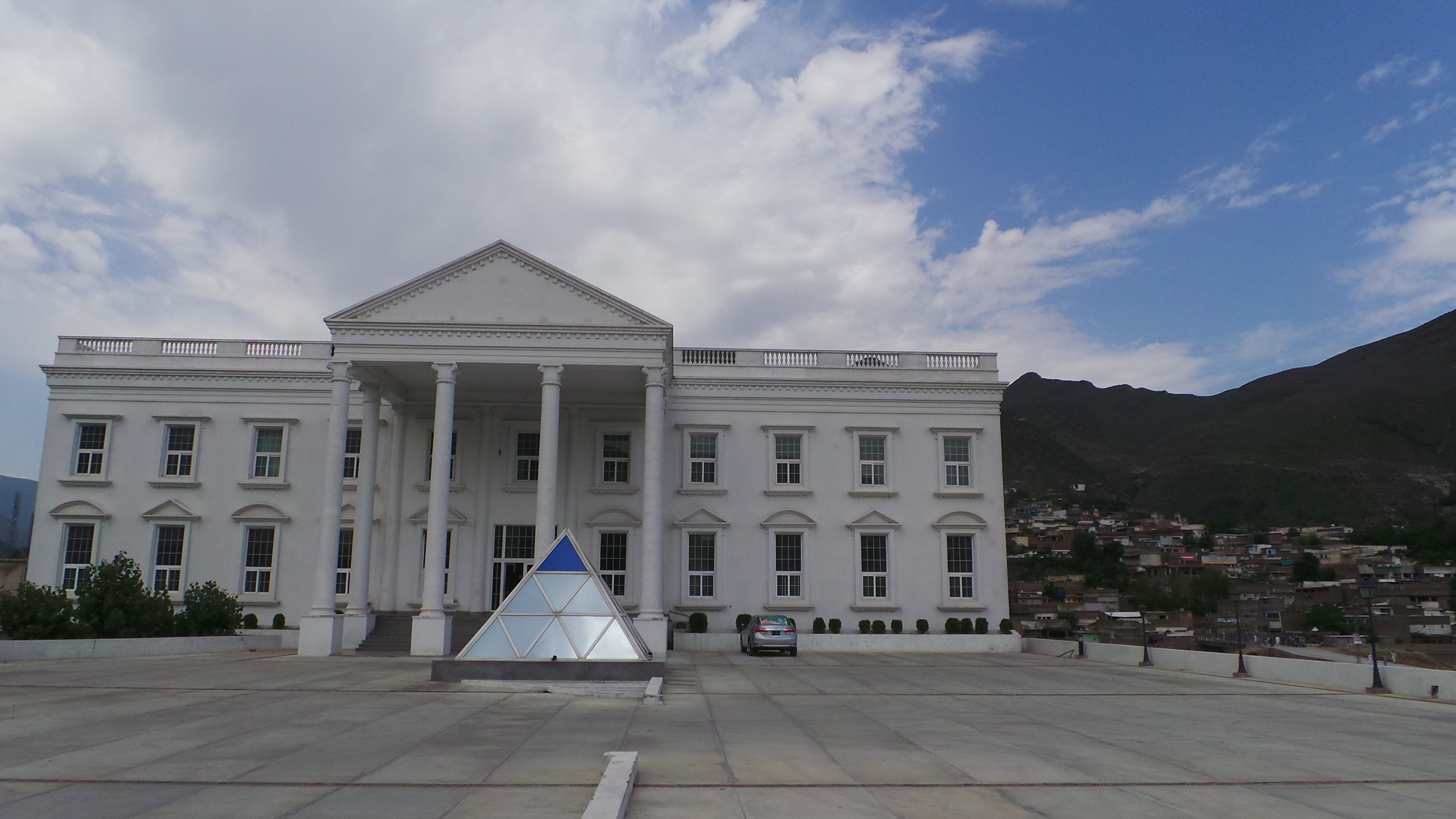
KIH Hospital, Saidu Sharif

The largest college in the district is P.G Jahanzeb College which was built in 1952. It offers intermediate studies and BSc and MSc degrees to both male and female students. Saidu Medical College is another college which was built here in 1998. This college ranks third in the government medical colleges in the province of Khyber Pakhtunkhwa. Moreover, there are numerous schools in Saidu Sharif, including the Govt Wadudia High School. On 7 July 2010, the first university of the district was established in this area.

== Archeological sites ==
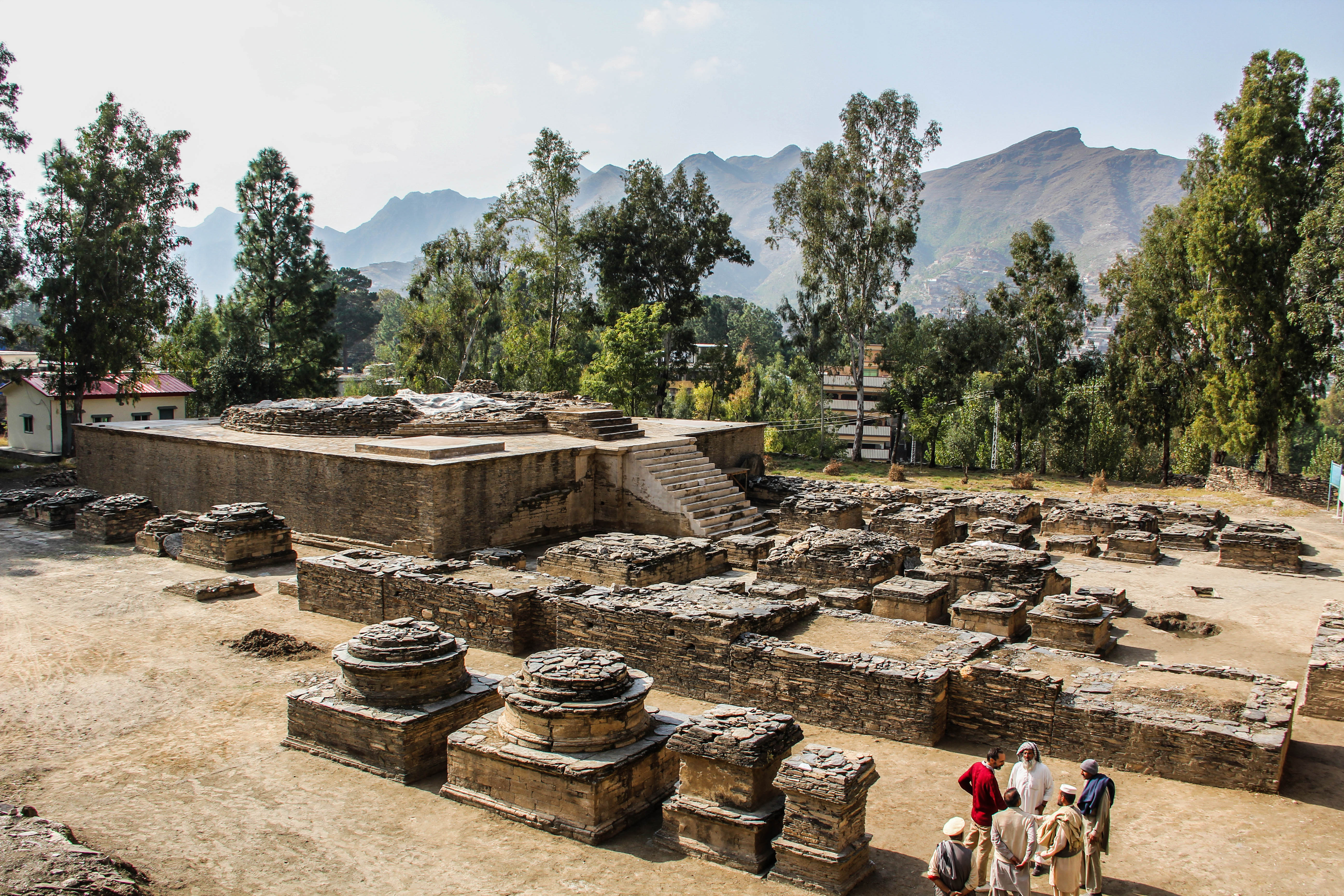
Saidu Sharif stupa

One of the most important Buddhist relics in Swat is near the museum. The stupa, which dates from the second century BC, was possibly built by the Mauryan emperor Ashoka to house some of the ashes of the Buddha. In subsequent centuries, it was enlarged five times by encasing the existing structure in a new shell.

Italian excavators working in 1955, exposed the successive layers of the stupa, each layer illustrating a stage in the evolution of building techniques.

=== Swat Museum ===
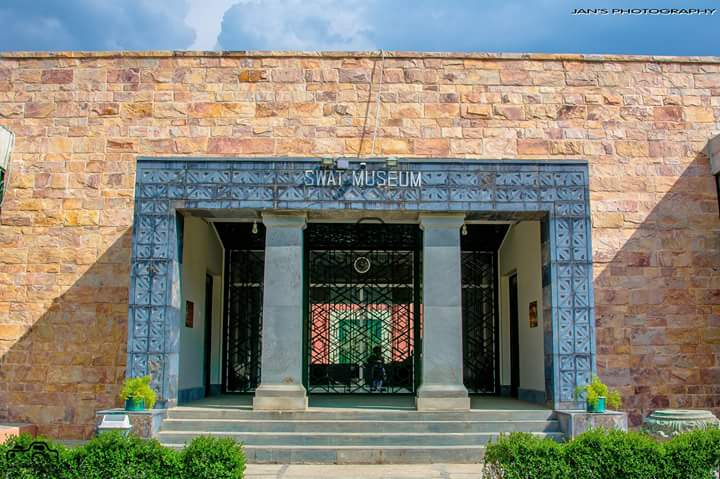
Swat Museum in Saidu Shairf

Swat Museum is a museum located on the road connecting Mingora and Saidu Sharif.

The museum contains Gandharan statuettes and friezes depicting the lives of the Buddha along with seals, small reliquaries and other treasures, mostly from Butkara No 1 and Odigram. Additionally, there are pre-Buddhist artefacts, and an ethnographic gallery with traditional carved Swati furniture, jewellery and embroideries. A recent discovery, includes a stone ‘board’ game found at the Buddhist Complex of Amluk Dara, of a sort still played in the valley today.

== Administrative divisions ==
Saidu Sharif is an administrative unit, known as union council or Ward in tehsil Babuzai, of the Swat district.

According to Khyber Pakhtunkhwa Local Government Act 2013 Swat District has 214 Wards: 170 Village Councils and 44 Neighbourhood Councils.

Saidu Sharif is Territorial Ward, which is further divided into three Neighbourhood Councils:

1. Saidu Sharif i (Neighbourhood Council)
2. Saidu Sharif ii (Neighbourhood Council)
3. Saidu Sharif iii (Neighbourhood Council)

== See also ==
- Swat District
