= Green Square =

Green Square may refer to:

- Green Square, New South Wales, in Sydney, Australia
- Martyrs' Square, Tripoli, in Libya, formerly known as Green Square
- Green Square, Mingora, in Swat District, Pakistan
- Green Square, a fictional character from the Facts with Blue series

== See also ==
- Greene Square (Savannah, Georgia)
