= Binawrai =

Village in Swat District, Pakistan

Binawrai (population c. 500) is a small village located about 35 km north of Mingora in Swat District, Khyber-Pakhtunkhwa province, Pakistan. Most of the people are farmers, and a considerable number of people live abroad and remit money to their families. Swat River is located to the west and Miadam stream to the south; as such, Binawrai is hemmed in by water from two sides.

The local language is Pashto.
