= Swat Museum =

Museum in Mingora, Pakistan

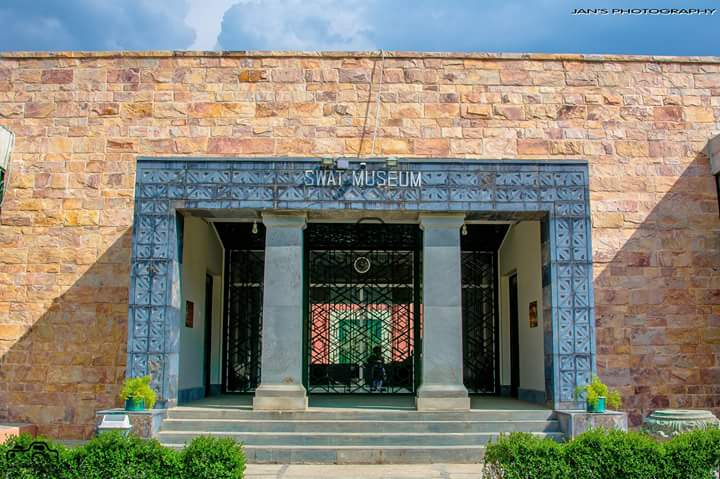
- Swat Museum
- Location: Swat District
- Coordinates: 34°45′49″N 72°21′34″E
- Type: Archaeological

Swat Museum is a museum located in Saidu Sharif, on the road connecting Mingora and Saidu Sharif in the Swat District of the Khyber Pakhtunkhwa province of Pakistan.

== History ==
The museum was conceived in 1959 under the aegis of the Italian Archaeological Mission to Swat and the Wali of Swat to contain his personal collection of artifacts. It was later expanded with the assistance of the Japanese government. However, it was badly damaged in the Kashmir earthquake in 2005. With the war between the Pakistan government and Taliban in 2007, the museum was closed and its contents were moved to Taxila, this proved lucky as a bomb exploded nearby in February, 2008 that killing many people and damaged the museum severely. The 2,700 objects were returned to the museum in July 2011, and a new seismic-resistant museum was opened on December 11, 2014.

== Collection ==
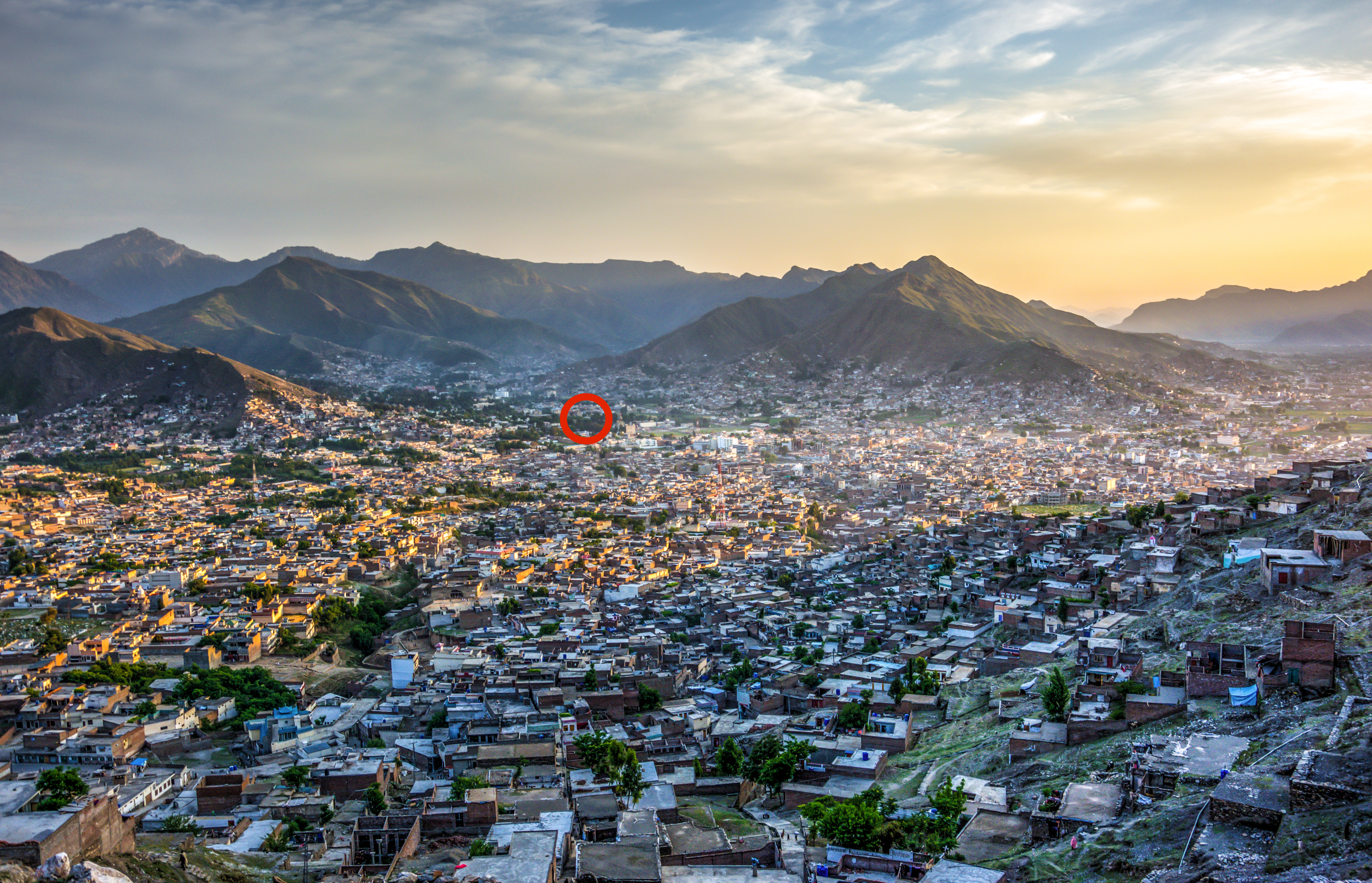
Location of Swat Museum in Saidu Sharif city.

The museum contains Gandharan statuettes and friezes depicting the lives of the Buddha along with seals, small reliquaries and other treasures, mostly from Butkara No 1 and Odigram. Additionally, there are pre-Buddhist artefacts, and an ethnographic gallery with traditional carved Swati furniture, jewelry and embroideries. A recent discovery, includes a stone ‘board’ game found at the Buddhist Complex of Amluk-Dara, of a sort still played in the valley today.
