= Allium tripterum =

Scientific classification
- Kingdom: Plantae
- Clade: Tracheophytes
- Clade: Angiosperms
- Clade: Monocots
- Order: Asparagales
- Family: Amaryllidaceae
- Subfamily: Allioideae
- Genus: Allium
- Subgenus: A. subg. Amerallium
- Species: A. tripterum

Binomial name
- Allium tripterum Nasir

Species of plant

Allium tripterum is a plant species endemic to a small region near Mingora, in northwestern Pakistan. It is a perennial herb up to 60 cm tall, with a spherical bulb up to 20 mm across. Leaves are long and narrow. Umbels are lax with only about 5-15 long-pediceled flowers. Tepals are pink or white with prominent purple midveins.
