= Khooni Chowk =

Landmark in Pakistan

Coordinates: 34.7766°N 72.3577°E

Khooni Chowk, officially known as Green Square or Green Chowk is a traffic intersection and a landmark in Mingora, Swat District, Pakistan. It is one of the most important intersections in Mingora, and there are numerous shops and establishments located around this square.

== Taliban rule ==
During the Taliban occupation of the Swat District, it became notorious as the place where the corpses of people summarily executed by the group were displayed each morning. The square thus earned the name Khooni Chowk ("Bloody Square"). The Taliban had heralded their ascendency in the area by killing the famous Pakistani dancer Shabana in the square.
