= Shabana (dancer) =

Pakistani dancer and singer

- Died: 2 January 2009; Mingora
- Cause of death: Killed by Taliban

Shabana (Urdu/Pashto:شبانه) was a Pakistani singer and dancer from Banr, Mingora, Swat, Pakistan. She was shot and killed by the Taliban militants of Swat in January 2009 at Mingora.

== See also ==
- Women in Pakistan
- Malala Yousafzai
- Farida Afridi
- Ghazala Javed
