= Khyber Pakhtunkhwa Local Government Act, 2012 =

Law in Pakistan

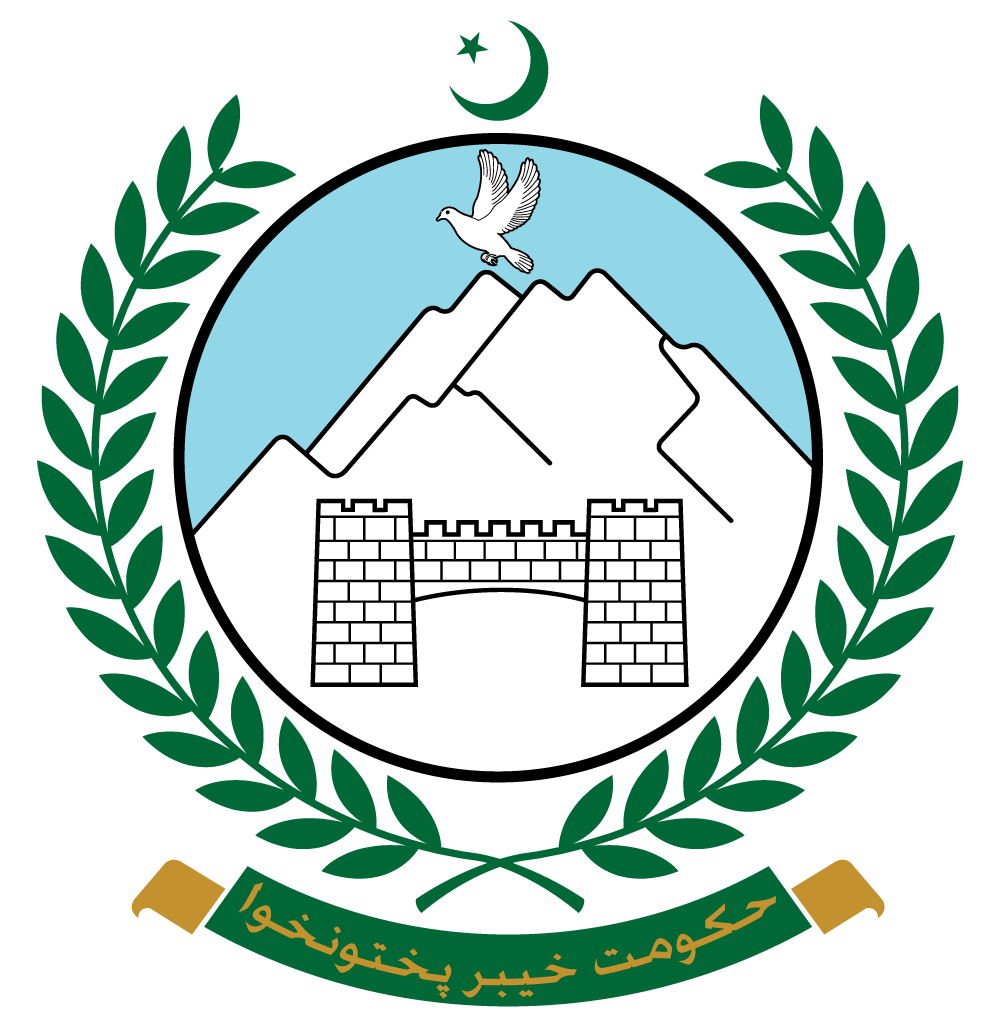

Khyber Pakhtunkhwa Assembly
- Long title: An Ordinance to construct and regulate the Local Councils in the Province of the Khyber Pakhtunkhwa and to consolidate law relating to Local Councils institutions and to provide for certain matters connected therewith and ancillary thereto
- Citation: Act No. VIII of 2012, No. PA/Khyber Pakhtunkhwa/Bills/2012/20753
- Territorial extent: Whole of Khyber Pakhtunkhwa, with power of the Government to exclude any area from any provision of the Act
- Passed by: Provincial Assembly of Khyber Pakhtunkhwa
- Passed: May 8th, 2012
- Enacted: January 1st, 2013
- Assented to: May 11th, 2012
- Repealed: October 31st, 2013 (Khyber Pakhtunkhwa Local Government Act, 2013, Act No. XXVIII of 2013, No. PA/Khyber Pakhtunkhwa/Bills/2013/10518)

Repeals
- North-West Frontier Province Local Government Ordinance, 2001, Ordinance No. XIV of 2001
- Status: Repealed

The Khyber Pakhtunkhwa Local Government Act, 2012 was an act passed by the Provincial Assembly of Khyber Pakhtunkhwa on May 8, 2012, and assented to by the Governor of Khyber Pakhtunkhwa on May 11, 2012. The act repealed the North-West Frontier Province Local Government Ordinance, 2001.

President Asif Ali Zardari approved extension of the act to the Malakand Division and the Provincially Administered Tribal Areas (PATA).
