= North-West Frontier Province Local Government Ordinance, 2001 =

Pakistani province temporary law

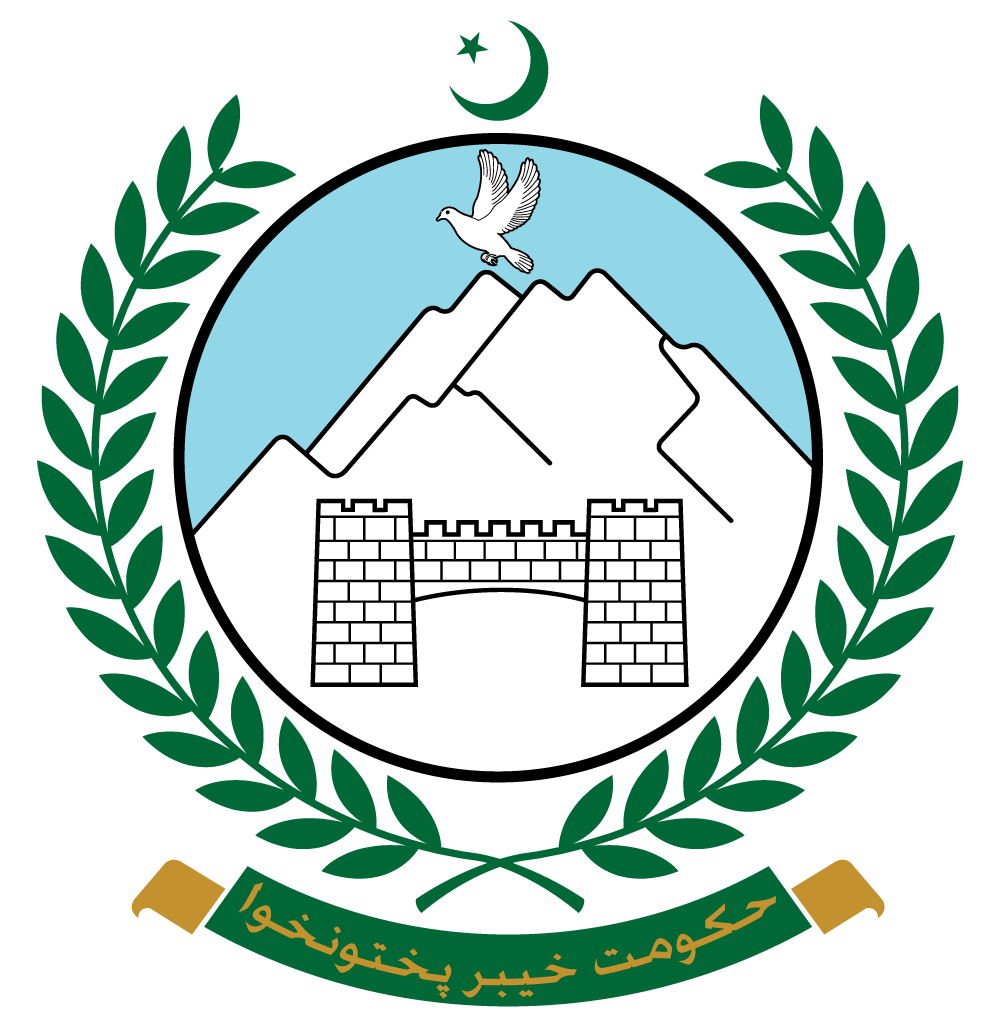

North-West Frontier Province Assembly
- Long title: An Ordinance to reconstruct and regulate the local governments
- Citation: Ordinance No. XIV of 2001
- Territorial extent: Whole of North-West Frontier Province except cantonments
- Passed by: Provincial Assembly of North-West Frontier Province
- Passed: 14 August 2001
- Repealed: 8 May 2012 (Khyber Pakhtunkhwa Local Government Act, 2012, Act No. VIII of 2012, No. PA/Khyber Pakhtunkhwa/Bills/2012/20753)
- Status: Repealed

The North-West Frontier Province Local Government Ordinance, 2001, or the Khyber Pakhtunkhwa Local Government Ordinance, 2001 was an ordinance passed by the Provincial Assembly of North-West Frontier Province (now known as Khyber Pakhtunkhwa) on 14 August 2001, as part of a series of local government ordinances prepared by the National Reconstruction Bureau passed together by each of the four provinces at the time.

The ordinance was repealed by the Khyber Pakhtunkhwa Local Government Act, 2012.
