= Shahdara, Swat =

Pakistani administrative area

Shahdara
- Union Council
- قلعہ کلے
- Country: Pakistan
- Province: Khyber Pakhtunkhwa
- District: Swat
- Time zone: UTC+5 (PST)

Shahdara (Urdu: قلعہ کلے) is an administrative unit, known as Union council, of Swat District in the Khyber Pakhtunkhwa province of Pakistan. District Swat has 7 Tehsils i.e. Khwazakhela, Kabal, Bahrain, Barikot, Babuzai, Charbagh, and Matta. Each Tehsill comprises certain numbers of union councils. There are 65 union councils in district Swat, 56 rural and also 9 urban.

== See also ==
- Swat District
