= Mingora funeral bombing =

2008 suicide attack in Pakistan

At about 8pm on 29 February 2008, a suicide bombing occurred in Mingora, Swat District, North-West Frontier Province, Pakistan. The bomber attacked the funeral of a police superintendent who had been killed along with three constables in a bombing earlier that day in Lakki Marwat, NWFP. The attack killed about 40 people - including the 16-year-old son of the superintendent - and injured dozens of others.
