= Jamila Ahmad =

Pakistani politician

Member of the National Assembly of Pakistan
- In office 2002–2007

Jamila Ahmad (Urdu: جمیلہ احمد) is a Pakistani politician who had been a Member of the National Assembly of Pakistan from 2002 to 2007.

== Political career ==
Ahmad was indirectly elected to the National Assembly of Pakistan as a candidate of Muttahida Majlis-e-Amal on reserved seat for women in the 2002 Pakistani general election.

She reportedly resigned in October 2007.
