= Mingora =

City in Swat Valley, Pakistan

Mingora: مینګورہ (Pashto); مینگورہ (Urdu)
- City
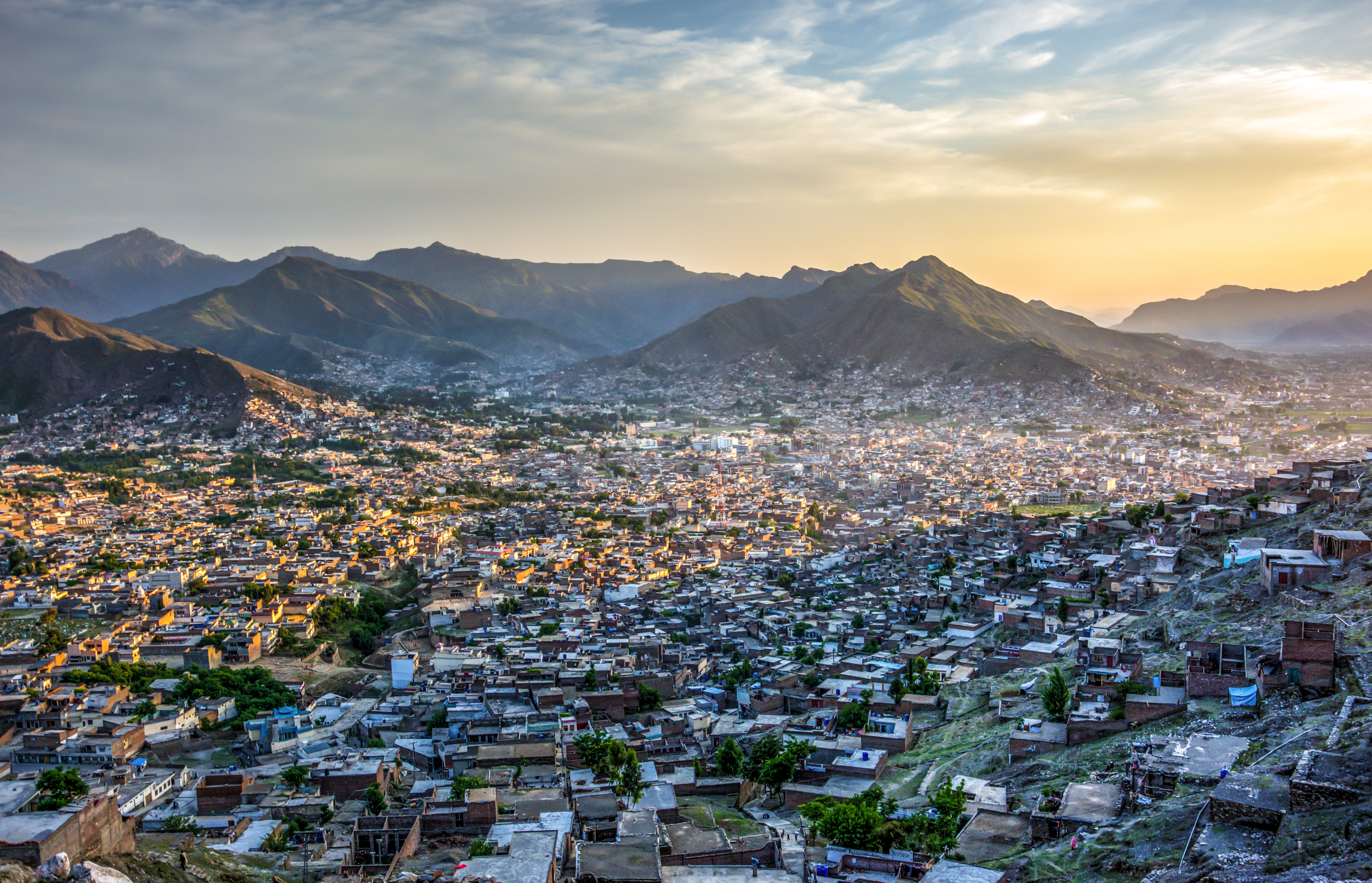
- View of Mingora

- Location of Mingora Mingora (Pakistan)
- Coordinates: 34°46′18″N 72°21′36″E
- Country: Pakistan
- Province: Khyber Pakhtunkhwa
- Division: Malakand
- District: Swat
- Tehsil: Babuzai

Government
  - Mayor: ELECTION AWAITED
- Elevation: 984 m (3,228 ft)

Population (2023)
  - City: 361,112
  - Rank: 28th in Pakistan; 3rd in Khyber Pakhtunkhwa
- Time zone: UTC+5 (PST)
- Calling code: (0946)
- Website: Mingora

Mingora (Note: Urdu: مینگورہ, Pashto: مینګورہ, Romanised: Minga Wara) is the capital city of Swat District Khyber Pakhtunkhwa, Pakistan. Located on the Swat River, it is the third largest city in Khyber Pakhtunkhwa and the 26th largest in Pakistan.

Mingora is the largest city and the epicenter of social, cultural, and economic activities in Malakand Division, and also the largest in the northern part of Khyber Pakhtunkhwa.

== History ==
The area around Mingora has long been inhabited. At Loe Banr, Butkara II and Matalai, Italian archaeologists unearthed 475 Indo-Aryan graves dated between 1520 and 170 BC and two horse skeletons. On the opposite side of the River Swat at Aligrama, near the Saidu Sharif airport, a site of Gandhara grave culture was discovered by the Italian archaeologists and dated to 1000 BC.

Buddhism arose in the region with the arrival of monks from the Gangetic plains. Under emperor Ashoka, Buddhism, specifically the Gandharan variant, became firmly established in the region which became a launching ground for Ashoka's transmission of Buddhist missionaries to the western regions from the Mediterranean and West Asia. Many Buddhist remains and carvings have been discovered near Mingora in the Jambil River Valley. At Panr, a stupa and monastery dated to the 1st century CE has been excavated. In Mingora, the 4th century Chinese Buddhist monk Faxian claimed to have seen the largest Buddhist monastery, and large carving of the foot-prints of Buddha carved on the sides of the ridges at Teerat. Excavations at the Butkara Stupa near Mingora revealed a large and imposing central stupa surrounded by more than 200 votive stupas which were discovered by Pakistani archeologist in the 20th century.

Following the collapse of Buddhist rule, the area came under the Hindu Shahis. Their rule marked the ascent of Hinduism and Hindu polities in the region once again, after centuries of Buddhist rule and domination of the area. Hindu Shahi rule came to an end with the rise of the Muslim empire of Mahmud Ghaznavi in the 11th century.

In 2007 during the rise of the Taliban insurgency, Mingora was invaded by the Taliban, largely impacting traditional culture in Mingora. A year later, the militant leader Fazlullah, then leader of Tehreek-e-Nafaz-e-Shariat-e-Mohammadi, established a pirated FM channel in the nearby Mamdheri village, approximately five kilometers away from Mingora. Fazlullah subsequently became leader of Tehrik-i-Taliban Pakistan in Swat Valley, encompassing the entirety of Mingora. The oppression of girls' education, Polio treatment, and freedom of expression became imminent throughout Mingora as a result, causing challenges for residents. Mingora's Green Square, once the hub of Mingora's social and cultural functions, became the execution grounds of Taliban opponents and dissidents, government officials, and civil workers, with corpses being hanged from electricity poles. In one instance, Shabana, a local singer and dancer, was brutally shot and killed by the Taliban with her body being dumped in Mingora's main roundabout. In 2008, a suicide bomber killed about 40 people at a funeral. Most of the city's income comes from goods at the bazaar, and tourism. The Operation Rah-e-Raast in 2009 brought Mingora back into Pakistani control.

== Demographics ==
Population

Historical population

Year	Pop.	±% p.a.
1961	15,920	—
1972	51,117	+11.19%
1981	88,078	+6.23%

Year	Pop.	±% p.a.
1998	173,868	+4.08%
2017	331,091	+3.45%
2023	361,112	+1.46%

According to 2023 census, Mingora had a population of 361,112.

== Climate ==
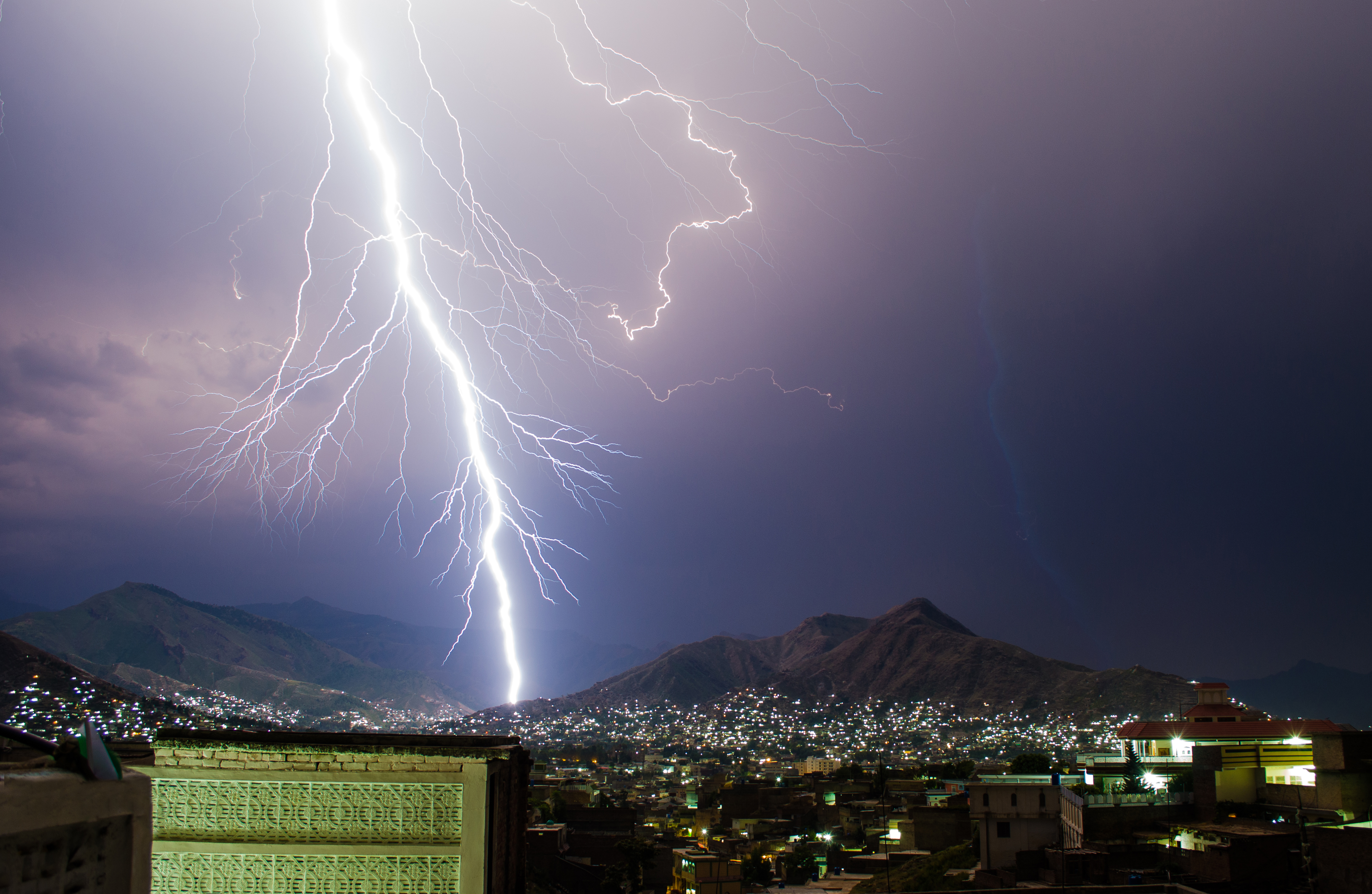
The city occasionally experiences thunderstorms

Mingora technically features a mediterranean climate (Csa) under the Köppen climate classification because June only receives 31ml of rain, even though the rest of summer is quite wet. The average annual temperature in Mingora is 19.3 °C, while the annual precipitation averages 897 mm. November is the driest month with 22 mm of precipitation, while August, the wettest month, has an average precipitation of 134 mm.

June is the hottest month of the year with an average temperature of 29.2 °C. The coldest month January has an average temperature of 7.6 °C.

Climate data for Mingora
Month	Jan	Feb	Mar	Apr	May	Jun	Jul	Aug	Sep	Oct	Nov	Dec	Year
Mean daily maximum °C (°F)	13.0 (55.4)	15.8 (60.4)	20.2 (68.4)	25.6 (78.1)	31.7 (89.1)	36.8 (98.2)	35.4 (95.7)	33.7 (92.7)	32.3 (90.1)	28.0 (82.4)	21.8 (71.2)	15.3 (59.5)	25.8 (78.4)
Daily mean °C (°F)	7.6 (45.7)	10.3 (50.5)	14.2 (57.6)	19.2 (66.6)	24.5 (76.1)	29.2 (84.6)	29.0 (84.2)	27.8 (82.0)	25.6 (78.1)	20.5 (68.9)	14.6 (58.3)	9.4 (48.9)	19.3 (66.8)
Mean daily minimum °C (°F)	2.1 (35.8)	4.8 (40.6)	8.2 (46.8)	12.7 (54.9)	17.3 (63.1)	21.6 (70.9)	22.6 (72.7)	21.9 (71.4)	18.9 (66.0)	12.9 (55.2)	7.4 (45.3)	3.5 (38.3)	12.8 (55.1)
Average rainfall mm (inches)	81 (3.2)	98 (3.9)	125 (4.9)	90 (3.5)	46 (1.8)	31 (1.2)	130 (5.1)	134 (5.3)	64 (2.5)	28 (1.1)	22 (0.9)	48 (1.9)	897 (35.3)
Source: Climate-Data.org

== Notable people ==
- Nazia Iqbal (born c. 1984), singer
- Ghazala Javed (1988–2012), singer
- Nasirul Mulk (born 1950), politician and former Chief Justice of Pakistan
- Malala Yousafzai (born 1997), Nobel Prize laureate, female education activist

== See also ==
- Swat Museum
- Ghoriwala
- Binawrai
- Malook Abad
