= Murder of Ghazala Javed =

Pakistani singer

Ghazala Javed

Background information
- Also known as: Ghazala
- Born: Ghazala Javed; January 1, 1988; Swat Valley, Pakistan
- Origin: Peshawar, Pakistan
- Died: June 18, 2012 (aged 24) Peshawar, Pakistan
- Genres: Pop, Folk
- Occupation: Singer
- Years active: 2004–2012

Ghazala Javed (Pashto: غزاله جاويد; 1 January 1988 – 18 June 2012) was a Pashtun playback singer from Swat Valley, Pakistan. She began singing in 2004 and was popular with young, progressive ethnic Pashtuns in Khyber Pakhtunkhwa. Her music was famous not only in Pakistan but also in neighbouring Afghanistan and among Pashtuns around the world.

== Career ==
Ghazala was born on 1 January 1988 in Swat Valley of Khyber Pakhtunkhwa province of Pakistan. In late 2007, the Pakistani Taliban were strengthening their grip in Swat so the young Ghazala and her family fled to the city of Peshawar. They settled in Peshawar, where Ghazala began her singing career. She subsequently recorded the songs 'Baran dy Baran dy' and 'Lag Rasha Kana'. Later in her career, she sang more melodious songs, gaining recognition among Pashtun communities in Pakistan, Afghanistan, and the diaspora.

She began performing in stage shows in Dubai and Kabul, earning between $12,000 and $15,000 for each wedding performance. According to Radio Kabul director Abdul Ghani Mudaqiq, "She was paid more than any other Pashtun artist—male or female—in Kabul... She was our most requested and popular Pashto singer." Her songs 'Za lewaney da mena', 'Za da cha khqula ta fikar wari yem', 'Kho leg rasha rasha kana' and 'Mena ba kawo Janana mena ba kawo' received positive reviews. She was nominated for a Filmfare Award in 2010 and received a Khyber Award in 2011.

== Personal life ==
Ghazala married Jehangir Khan, a property dealer from Peshawar, on 7 February 2010. She later discovered that he was already married. She separated from him and moved back in with her parents in November 2010. On 12 October 2011, she filed for divorce at a civil court in Swat. The court ruled in her favour on 4 December 2011.

== Death ==
Ghazala, along with her father, were shot dead in a drive-by shooting by gunmen on a motorcycle, on June 18, 2012. On 16 December 2013 Swat District and Sessions Court found her former husband, Jahangir Khan guilty of killing her and her father and awarded him two death sentences along with Rs 70 million in fine. On 22 May 2014 the Peshawar High Court set aside the sentence on the basis of compromise between the heirs of the two victims and Jehangir Khan.

== Discography ==
- 2009 – Ghazala Javed Vol.1
- 2010 – Ghazala Javed And [Nazia Iqbal]
- 2010 – Ghazala Javed Vol.2
- 2010 – Raza Che Rogha Okro
- 2011 – Best Of Ghazala Javed
- 2011 – Ghazala Javed Vol.3
- 2011 – Zo Spogmaii Yum
- 2012 – Zhwandon TV concert in Afghanistan

== See also ==
- Women in Pakistan
