= Neighbourhood Council (Khyber Pakhtunkhwa) =

- Neighbourhood Council (KPK)
- Country: Pakistan
- Province: Khyber Pakhtunkhwa
- Time zone: UTC+5 (PST)

Neighbourhood Council is an Administrative Unit in Khyber Pakhtunkhwa (KPK). It is notified in Khyber Pakhtunkhwa Local Government Act 2013.

Ward is similar to Union Council, But Ward is a new term and new demarcation by Khyber Pakhtunkhwa Government. While Union Councils are based upon West Pakistan Land Revenue Act, 1967 (W.P. Act No. XVII of 1967)

Ward may consist of:

- Village Council or
- Neighbourhood Council

Village Council is rural places, while Neighbourhood Councils are urban and they are near to main city or have characteristics of city.

In Khyber Pakhtunkhwa there are total 2996 Village Councils. and 505 Neighborhood Councils. While total number of Union Councils is 1001.

== See also ==
- Village Council (KPK)
- Ward (KPK)
- KPK Local Government Act 2013 (Village Council)
- Babuzai
