= Ward (Khyber Pakhtunkhwa) =

- Ward
- Country: Pakistan
- Province: Khyber Pakhtunkhwa
- Time zone: UTC+5 (PST)

Ward is an administrative unit in Khyber Pakhtunkhwa (KPK), Pakistan. It is notified in Khyber Pakhtunkhwa Local Government Act 2013.

Ward, similar to a Union Council, is a new term and demarcation by the Khyber Pakhtunkhwa Government. While Union Councils are based upon West Pakistan Land Revenue Act, 1967 (W.P. Act No. XVII of 1967)

Ward may consist of:

- Village Council or
- Neighbourhood Council

Village Council is rural places, while Neighbourhood Councils are urban and they are near to main city or have some of characteristics of city.

Each ward is considered to be a complete local government, having their own District Councilor, Tehsil Councilor, General Councilors, Peasant Councilors, Women Councilors and Youth Councilors, to represent different communities of human and to struggle for their own benefits.

In Khyber Pakhtunkhwa there are total 2996 Village Councils. and 505 Neighborhood Councils. While total number of Union Councils is 1001.

== See also ==
- Village Council (Khyber Pakhtunkhwa)
- Neighbourhood Council
- Khyber Pakhtunkhwa Local Government Act 2013 (Village Council)
- Babuzai
