= Village Council (Khyber Pakhtunkhwa) =

- Village Council (KPK)
- Country: Pakistan
- Province: Khyber Pakhtunkhwa
- Time zone: UTC+5 (PST)

Village Council is an administrative unit in Pakistan's Khyber Pakhtunkhwa province. It is notified in Khyber Pakhtunkhwa Local Government Act 2013.

Ward is same like Union Council, But Ward is new term and new demarcation by Khyber Pakhtunkhwa Government. While Union Councils are based upon West Pakistan Land Revenue Act, 1967 (W.P. Act No. XVII of 1967)

Ward may consist of:

- Village Council or
- Neighbourhood Council

Village Council is Rural places, while Neighbourhood Council are Urban and they are near to main city or have some of characteristics of City.

In Khyber Pakhtunkhwa there are total 2996 Village Councils. and 505 Neighborhood Councils. While the total number of Union Councils is 1001.

== See also ==
- Ward
- Neighbourhood Council
- Khyber Pakhtunkhwa Local Government Act 2013#Village
- Babuzai
