= Babuzai Tehsil =

Union Council in Khyber Pakhtunkhwa, Pakistan

Babuzai بابوزي
- Tehsil
- Country: Pakistan
- Province: Khyber Pakhtunkhwa
- District: Swat District

Population (2017)
  - Tehsil: 25,386
  - Urban: 18,839
  - Rural: 6,547
- Time zone: UTC+5 (PST)

Babuzai is a tehsil in Swat District, Khyber Pakhtunkhwa, Pakistan. Babuzai is named after the local Pashtun tribe of the same name, the Babuzai.

Babuzai is one of Swat District's eight tehsils, each of which comprises a number of union councils. There are 64 union councils in Swat District.

According to Khyber Pakhtunkhwa Local Government Act 2013, the Babuzai Tehsil has the two wards: VC Aba khel and VC Bharat khel/

== See also ==
- Katlang Tehsil
- Saidu Sharif
