= Swat District =

District in Khyber Pakhtunkhwa, Pakistan

Swat District سوات اولسوالۍ ضلع سوات
- District
- 1969–2025
- Map of the former district in Khyber Pakhtunkhwa
- Capital: Mingora
- Area
  - 1969–2025: 5,337 km^{2} (2,061 sq mi)
- Population
  - 1969–2025: 2,687,384
  - Type: District
- History
  - Established: 1969
  - Establishment of Upper and Lower Swat District: 2025
- Political subdivisions: 7 Tehsils
Preceded by
Swat State
- Today part of: Pakistan · Lower Swat & Upper Swat Districts of Khyber Pakhtunkhwa

Swat District (Pashto: سوات اولسوالۍ, Urdu: ضلع سوات) was an administrative district in the Malakand Division of Khyber Pakhtunkhwa, Pakistan from 1969 to 2025. The district was known for its natural sites and was a popular tourist destination. It had a population of 2,687,384 per the 2023 national census, and was the 15th-largest district of Khyber Pakhtunkhwa at the time.

Swat District was centred on the Swat Valley, usually referred to simply as Swat, which is a natural geographic region surrounding the Swat River.

== History ==
In 1947, following the Partition of British India and subsequent independence of Pakistan, Swat princely state acceded to the Dominion of Pakistan continuing as a self-governing princely state until it was officially annexed and merged into West Pakistan and later became a part of North-West Frontier Province (later Khyber Pakhtunkhwa) in 1969, forming the Swat district. The former tehsil of Buner was granted the status of a separate district in 1991. Shangla was separated into a district in 1995.

In October 2025, the government divided the Swat District into two, the Upper Swat District and (lower) Swat District.

== Geography ==
Swat's total area was 5,337 square kilometres (2,061 mi^{2}). Swat District consisted of two well-defined geographic regions, Swat Kohistan and Swat Proper. Swat Kohistan formed the larger, northern part of the district, while Swat Proper formed the lower portion of the district. In terms of administrative divisions, Swat was surrounded by Chitral, Upper Dir and Lower Dir to the west, Gilgit-Baltistan to the north, and Kohistan, Buner and Shangla to the east and southeast, respectively.

== Demographics ==
Historical population
Year	Pop.	±% p.a.
1951	283,720	—
1961	344,859	+1.97%
1972	520,614	+3.82%
1981	715,938	+3.60%
1998	1,257,602	+3.37%
2017	2,308,624	+3.25%
2023	2,687,384	+2.56%

As of the 2023 census, Swat district had 381,212 households and a population of 2,687,384. The district had a sex ratio of 104.83 males to 100 females and a literacy rate of 48.13%: 61.83% for males and 33.95% for females. 808,888 (30.11% of the surveyed population) were under 10 years of age. 794,368 (29.56%) lived in urban areas.

=== Languages ===
Languages of Swat district (2023)
1. Pashto (92.2%)
2. Kohistani (1.47%)
3. Others (mainly Gujari, Torwali, Gawri) (6.35%)

As of the 2023 census, Pashto speaking communities made up 92.18% of the population. Kohistani languages were spoken by 1.47% of the population and languages classified as 'Others', mainly Gawri, Torwali and Gujari were spoken by 6.10% of the population, and formed the majority in the Swat Kohistan region of Upper Swat.

=== Religions ===
Religion in Swat District
Religion	2017		2023	
Religion	Pop.	%	Pop.	%
Islam	2,306,813	99.92%	2,677,745	99.69%
Christianity	502	0.02%	7,219	0.27%
Hinduism	200	0.01%	117	~0%
Sikhism	—N/a	—N/a	540	0.02%
Others	1,109	0.05%	455	0.02%
Total Population	2,308,624	100%	2,686,076 (Note: Different from official population figure since it excludes sensitive areas where religion was not asked)	100%

== Economy ==
Approximately 38% of economy of Swat depended on tourism and 31% on agriculture.

=== Agriculture ===
Gwalerai, a village located near Mingora, is one of those few villages which produces 18 varieties of apples due to its agriculturally favourable temperate climate in summer. The apple produced here is consumed in Pakistan as well as exported to other countries. It is known as 'the apple of Swat'.

== Education ==
According to the Alif Ailaan Pakistan Education Rankings for 2017, Swat with a score of 53.1, was ranked 86 out of 155 districts in terms of education. Furthermore, the Swat schools infrastructure scored 90.26 which ranked it on number 31 out of 155.

== Administrative divisions ==
The seven tehsils of the Swat District in 2020.

Before its bifurcation in 2025, Swat was subdivided into seven administrative units, known as Tehsils:

Tehsil	Area (km^{2})	Pop. (2023)	Density (ppl/km^{2}) (2023)	Literacy rate (2023)	Union Councils
Behrain Tehsil	2,899	270,623	93.35	39.26%	
Matta Tehsil	684	552,431	807.65	42.54%	
Kabal Tehsil	485	480,827	991.4	49.26%	
Barikot Tehsil	419	220,148	525.41	50.87%	
Khwaza Khela Tehsil	392	307,300	783.93	42.63%	
Babuzai Tehsil	297	696,697	2,345.78	56.06%	
Charbagh Tehsil	161	159,358	989.8	50.01%	

Each tehsil comprises certain numbers of union councils. Swat had 65 union councils: 56 rural and 9 urban.

According to the Khyber Pakhtunkhwa Local Government Act, 2013, a new local governments system was introduced, in which Swat was included. This system has 67 wards, in which the total number of village councils is around 170, while neighbourhood councils number around 44.

=== Politics ===
The region elects three male members of the National Assembly of Pakistan (MNAs), one female MNA, seven male members of the Provincial Assembly of Khyber Pakhtunkhwa (MPAs) and two female MPAs. In the 2002 National and Provincial elections, the Muttahida Majlis-e-Amal (MMA), an alliance of religious political parties, won all the seats.

=== Provincial Assembly ===
Member of Provincial Assembly	Party affiliation	Constituency	Year
Sharafat Ali	Pakistan Tehreek-e-Insaf	PK-3 Swat-I	2024
Ali Shah	Pakistan Tehreek-e-Insaf	PK-4 Swat-II	2024
Akhtar khan	Pakistan Tehreek-e-Insaf	PK-5 Swat-III	2024
Fazal Hakeem Khan	Pakistan Tehreek-e-Insaf	PK-6 Swat-IV	2024
Amjad Ali	Pakistan Tehreek-e-Insaf	PK-7 Swat-V	2024
Hameed ur rahman	Pakistan Tehreek-e-Insaf	PK-8 Swat-VI	2024
Sultan e room	Pakistan Tehreek-e-Insaf	PK-9 Swat-VII	2024
Muhammad Naeem	Pakistan Tehreek-e-Insaf	PK-10 Swat-VIII	2024

== Notable people ==
- Wadud of Swat (Miangul Abdul Wadud)
- Jahan Zeb of Swat (Miangul Jahan Zeb)
- Miangul Aurangzeb
- Miangul Adnan Aurangzeb
- Mubarika Yusufzai
- Wāli of Swat
- Zebunisa Jilani
- Mahmood Khan
- Malala Yousafzai
- Ziauddin Yousafzai
- Muhib Ullah Khan
- Anwar Ali
- Nazia Iqbal
- Ghazala Javed
- Afzal Khan Lala
- Haider Ali Khan
- Jamila Ahmad
- Rahim Khan
- Nasirul Mulk
- Badar Munir
- Murad Saeed
- Shaheen Sardar Ali
- Rahim Shah
- Sherin Zada

== See also ==
- Upper Swat District
