= Khyber Pakhtunkhwa Local Government Act, 2013 =

Law in Khyber Pakhtunkhwa, Pakistan

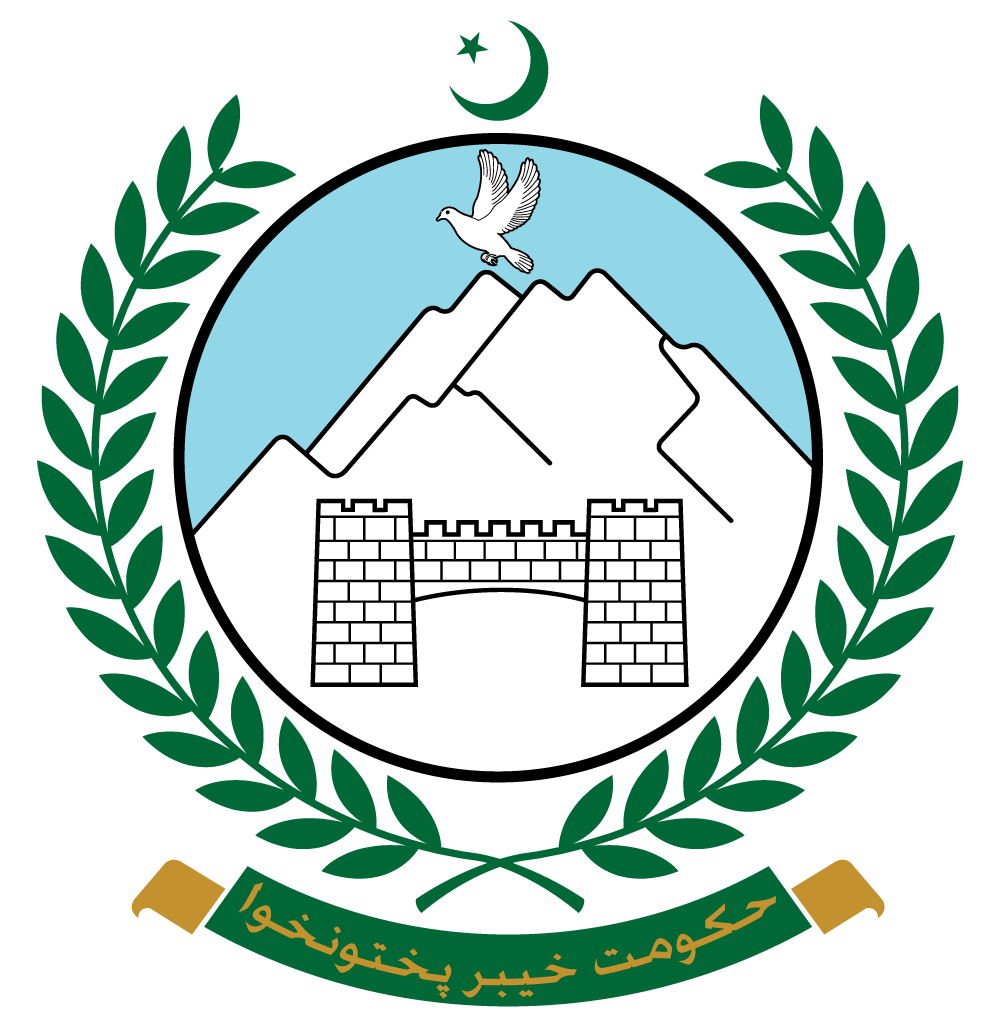

Khyber Pakhtunkhwa Assembly
- Long title: An Act to construct and regulate local government institutions in the Province of the Khyber Pakhtunkhwa and to consolidate laws relating to these institutions and to provide for matters connected therewith and ancillary thereto
- Citation: Act No. XXVIII of 2013, No. PA/Khyber Pakhtunkhwa/Bills/2013/10518
- Territorial extent: Whole of Khyber Pakhtunkhwa except cantonments or any other area excluded by the Government
- Passed by: Provincial Assembly of Khyber Pakhtunkhwa
- Passed: October 31st, 2013
- Enacted: November 5th, 2013

Repeals
- Khyber Pakhtunkhwa Local Government Act, 2012, Act No. VIII of 2012, No. PA/Khyber Pakhtunkhwa/Bills/2012/20753

Amended by
- Khyber Pakhtunkhwa Local Government (Amendment) Act, 2014, Act No. XXI of 2014; Khyber Pakhtunkhwa Local Government (Amendment) Act, 2015, Act No. XXXIV of 2015; Khyber Paktunkhwa Local Government (Second Amendment) Act, 2015, Act No. XI of 2015; Khyber Pakhtunkhwa Local Government (Third Amendment) Act, 2015, Act No. XXIX of 2015; Khyber Pakhtunkhwa Local Government (Fourth Amendment) Act, 2015, Act No. XXX of 2015
- Status: Amended

The Khyber Pakhtunkhwa Local Government Act 2013 was passed by the provincial Assembly of Khyber Pakhtunkhwa on 31 October 2013, and is published as an Act of the Provincial Legislature of the Khyber Pakhtunkhwa as No.PA/Khyber Pakhtunkhwa/Bills/2013/10518 by the Authority of Local Government Elections & Rural Development Department on 7 November 2013.

An Act; "to construct and regulate local government institutions in the Province of the Khyber Pakhtunkhwa and to consolidate laws relating to these institutions and to provide for matters connected therewith and ancillary thereto".

== Definitions ==
---In this Act, unless the context otherwise requires,-

=== District ===
“District” means a revenue district notified under the West Pakistan Land Revenue Act, 1967 (W.P. Act No. XVII of 1967);(Clause s)

=== Neighbourhood ===
"Neighbourhood Council" means a mohallah, a group of streets, lanes or roads, in areas with urban characteristics, designated as Neighbourhood by Government;(Clause f)

A Neighbourhood Council for a Neighbourhood is areas with urban characteristics(5-f).

=== Village ===
"Village or Village Council" means an integrated and contiguous human habitation commonly identified by a name and includes a Dhok, Chak, Kalay(Pashto: کلے), Goth, Gaown (Urdu: گاوں), Deh, Basti or any other comparable habitation;(Section ii)

A Village Council for a village is the rural areas(5-e).

=== Tehsil ===
"Tehsil" means a Tehsil notified under the West Pakistan Land Revenue Act, 1967 (W.P. Act No. XVII of 1967);(gg).

=== Town ===
"Town" means an area notified by the Government under section-9 to be a Town in a City District;(hh).

== See also ==
- Ward
- Village Council
- Neighbourhood Council
- Government of Khyber Pakhtunkhwa
