= Toponymy of Swat Valley =

The toponyms in the Swat Valley come from Indo-Aryan, Pashto, Persian and Arabic roots. Archaeological evidence shows that the earliest inhabitants of Swat Valley were Indo-Aryans, followed by Pashtuns in the late 15th-century. Many names in the valley come from Persian and Arabic roots as well due to post-Islamic influences.

In general, hydronyms are the most conservative of the toponyms, and hence, most of the names of rivers, lakes and other water bodies, including that of eponymous Swat River itself, have Indo-Aryan roots. Following the Yousafzai conquest of Swat, and especially the establishment of state of Swat, many of the earlier names were Pashtunised/Islamised.

Since Pashtun penetration into the valley was upstream from south, most of toponyms in lower valley are from Pashto; on the other hand, Indo-Aryan names are most common in the north, where the last surviving Indo-Aryan languages of Swat, Torwali and Gawri, are still spoken.

The common suffixes found in the names in Swat include -khwar (Pashto: 'stream', e.g. Jaba Khwar), -gram (Indo-Aryan: 'village', e.g. Odigram), and -bela (Indo-Aryan, settlement, e.g. Kedam Bela). The Indo-Aryan -gol (lit. stream) is also used for three tributaries of Swat River in north.

In case of names of peaks (oronym), the general trend of Pashto/Islamic names in south and older Indo-Aryan names in north is evident, although there are exceptions. Most prominent peaks have Pashto origins names, including that of highest peak in Swat, Falak Sar (lit. heavenly peak, from Arabic falak "sky"), while that of second highest peak, Mankial Sar, comes from an old Indo-Aryan root.

The names of pastures and mountain passes are not very old, usually being replaced recently during the era of state of Swat. Hence, most have Pashto roots, and in a few cases, Gujari (another Indo-Aryan language sparsely spoken in northern Swat) which arrived only in the early modern period in Swat.

The names of all upper streams of Swat River flowing through Swat Kohistan: Gabral, Utror, Usho, Bhandara, Palaga, Asret and Darel etc., comes from Indo-Aryan roots. While in lower Swat Valley the names of streams show a mix of Pashto or Islamic (e.g. Khawazkhela, Charbagh, Saidu, Landai etc.) and Indo-Aryan (e.g. Jolagram, Kotlai, Dadhra etc.) origins. Majority of peaks have Pashto names, although a few (e.g. Luda Sar, 4525 m; Mankial Sar, 5710 m; Tikai Sar, 4980 m) have names of Indo-Aryan origin. Similarly mountain passes have mostly Pashto-origin name, with a few exceptions (e.g. Baskaro-An, to Gilgit, Manali-An, to Dir, Palesar-An, to Kohistan etc.).
