= Fizagat =

Hill station in Pakistan

Coordinates: 34°47′31″N 72°22′00″E

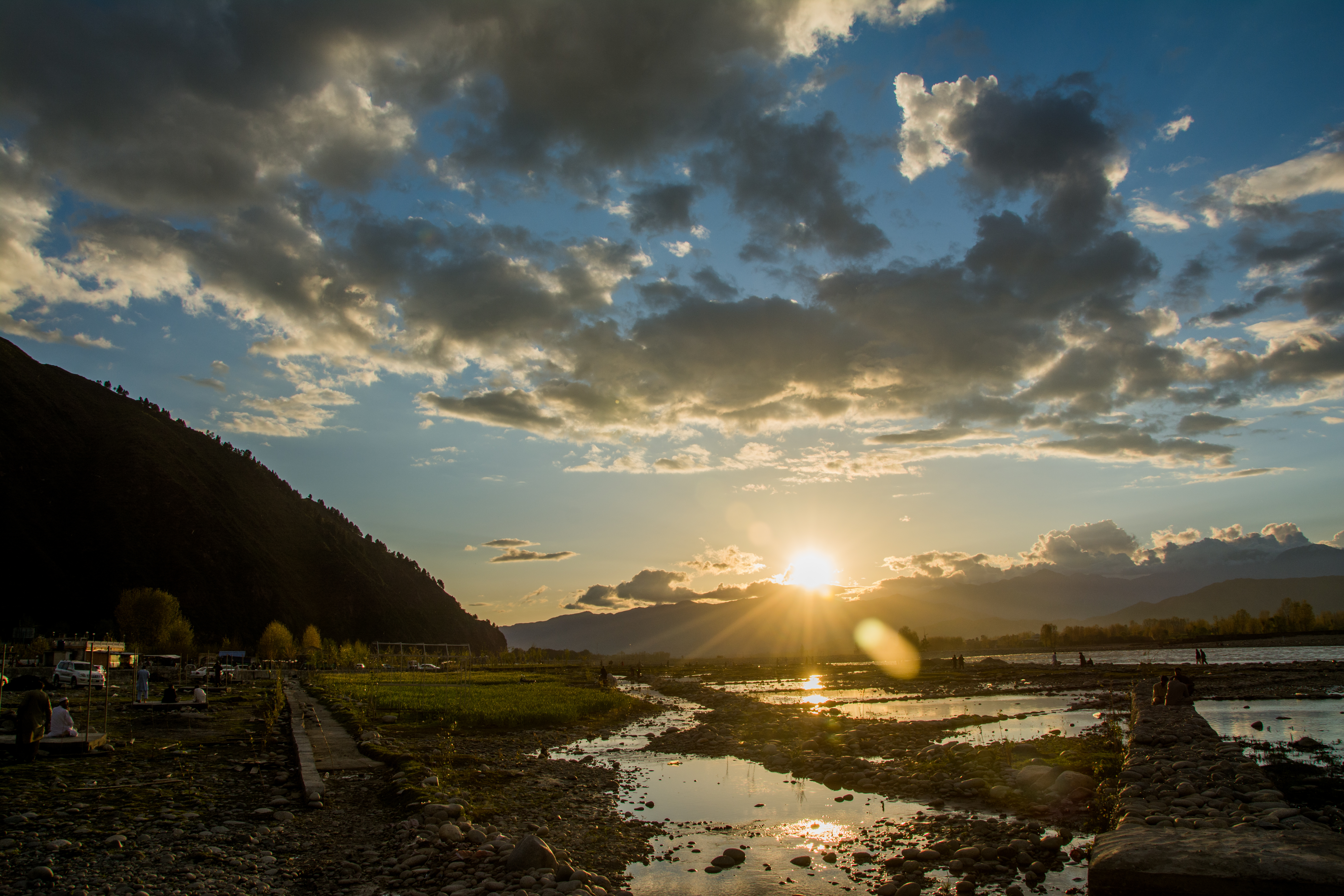
Fizagat Mingora Swatvalley

Fizagat or Hyatabad is a popular hill station located in Swat Valley of Khyber Pakhtunkhwa, Pakistan. Fizagat Recreation Park is located there.

The area is prone to flooding and residents have complained of lack of action by the government.
