= Fizagat Recreation Park =

Recreational park in the vicinity of Mingora in Pakistan

Fizagat Municipal Park
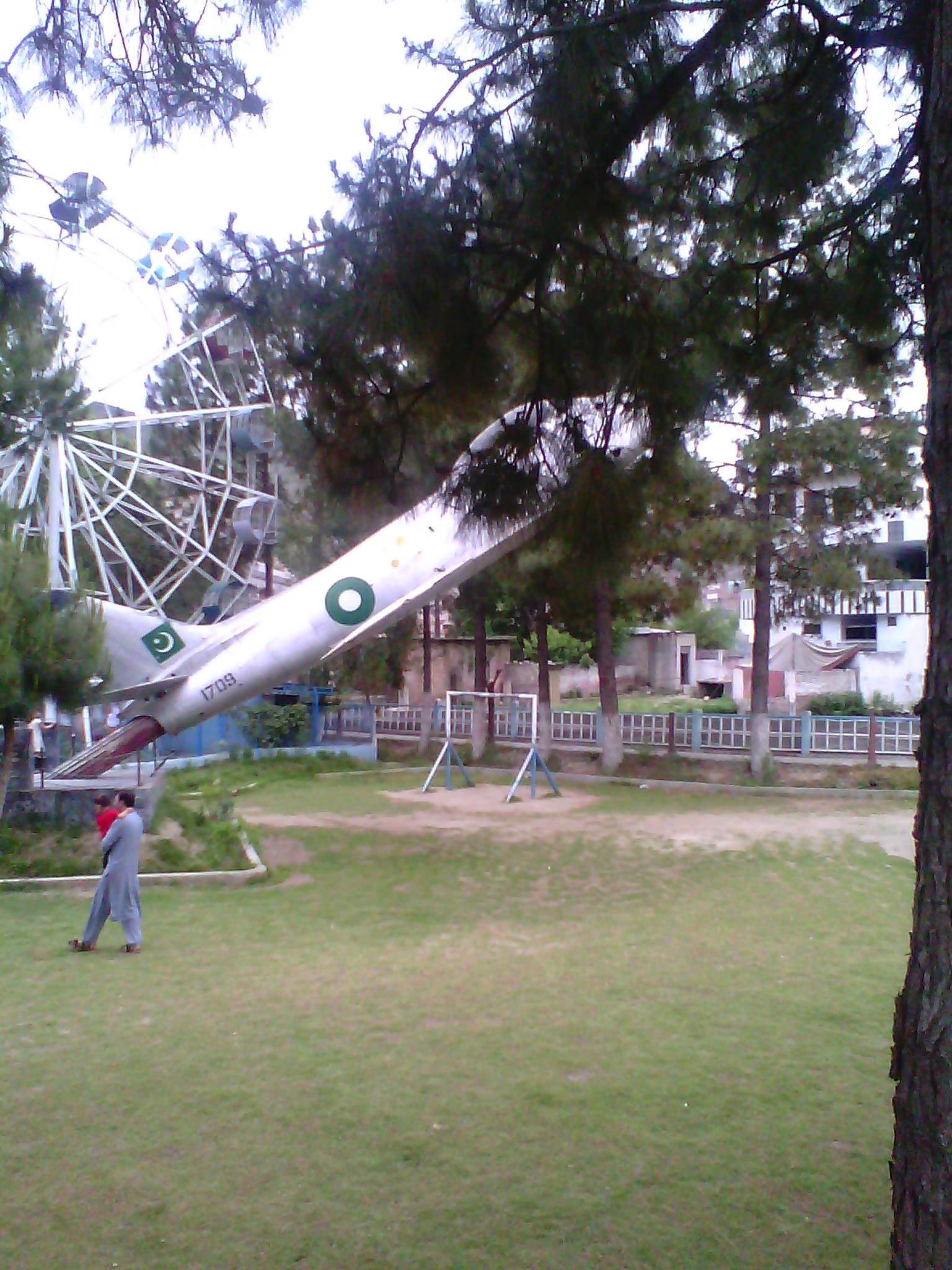

- Location within Pakistan
- Location: Khyber Pakhtunkhwa, Pakistan
- Nearest city: Mingora, Swat, Pakistan
- Coordinates: 34°47′33″N 72°22′41″E
- Established: 1984

Fizagat Park is a recreational park in the vicinity of Mingora in Pakistan. It is a popular destination for tourists visiting the valley of Swat, Khyber Pakhtunkhwa. It is situated on the bank of the Swat River at Fizagat. Its main feature is the stream of freshwater from the river Swat flowing.

== History ==
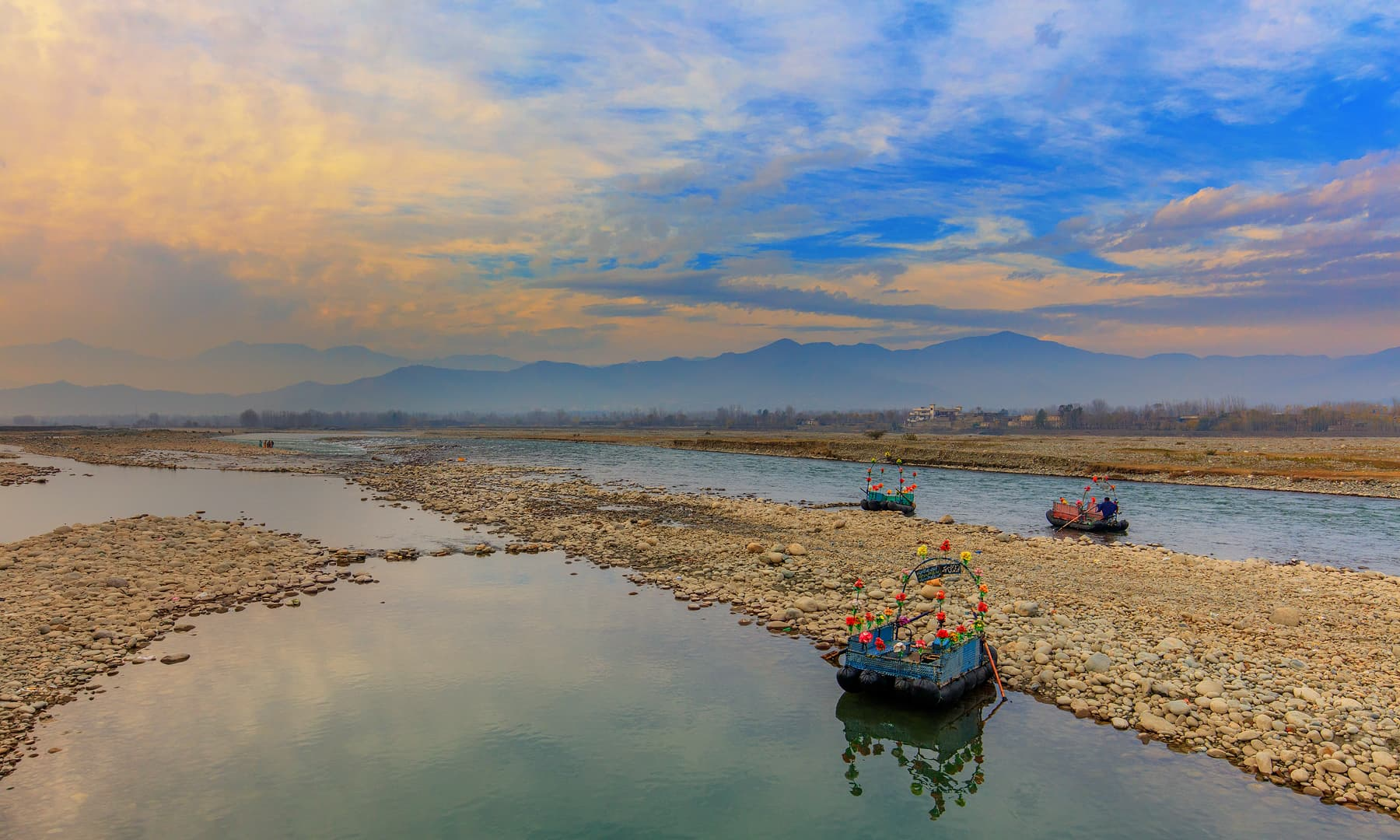
Tube boats in Fiza Gat proximity

The park was established in 1984 by then chairman of the Municipal committee of Mingora Malak Bairam Khan. During the 2010 flood, some areas of the park were damaged. Renovation began in June, 2012, performed by the Tehsil municipal administration with the financial assistance of PaaRSA. Rs 3.5 million were allocated for rehabilitation. Additional land of 35,000 ft^{2} was added to the park. The park was revamped with the cooperation of the Government of Japan in 2013. Rs 14 million had been allocated for the park’s upkeep in 2015.

On 6 July 2015, an expansion project was inaugurated. The project included planting of trees, construction of a bridge, a solar-powered illumination system, expansion and further beautification.

== Avenue of the park ==
Fizagat park is located one kilometer from Mingora, opposite the Maulana Fazlullah Islamic Center (Imam Dherai), between an emerald mine factory and the river. The area surrounding the park looks out to Swat valley. Due to its pleasant weather, hotels and resthouses cluster nearby. Tent villages are arranged around the park to house local and foreign visitors.

== Attractions ==
The park is divided into separate sections for families, women and children. A zoo, river lifts, cable cars and river boats are there.

== See also ==
- Swat, Pakistan
