= Nemogram Stupa =

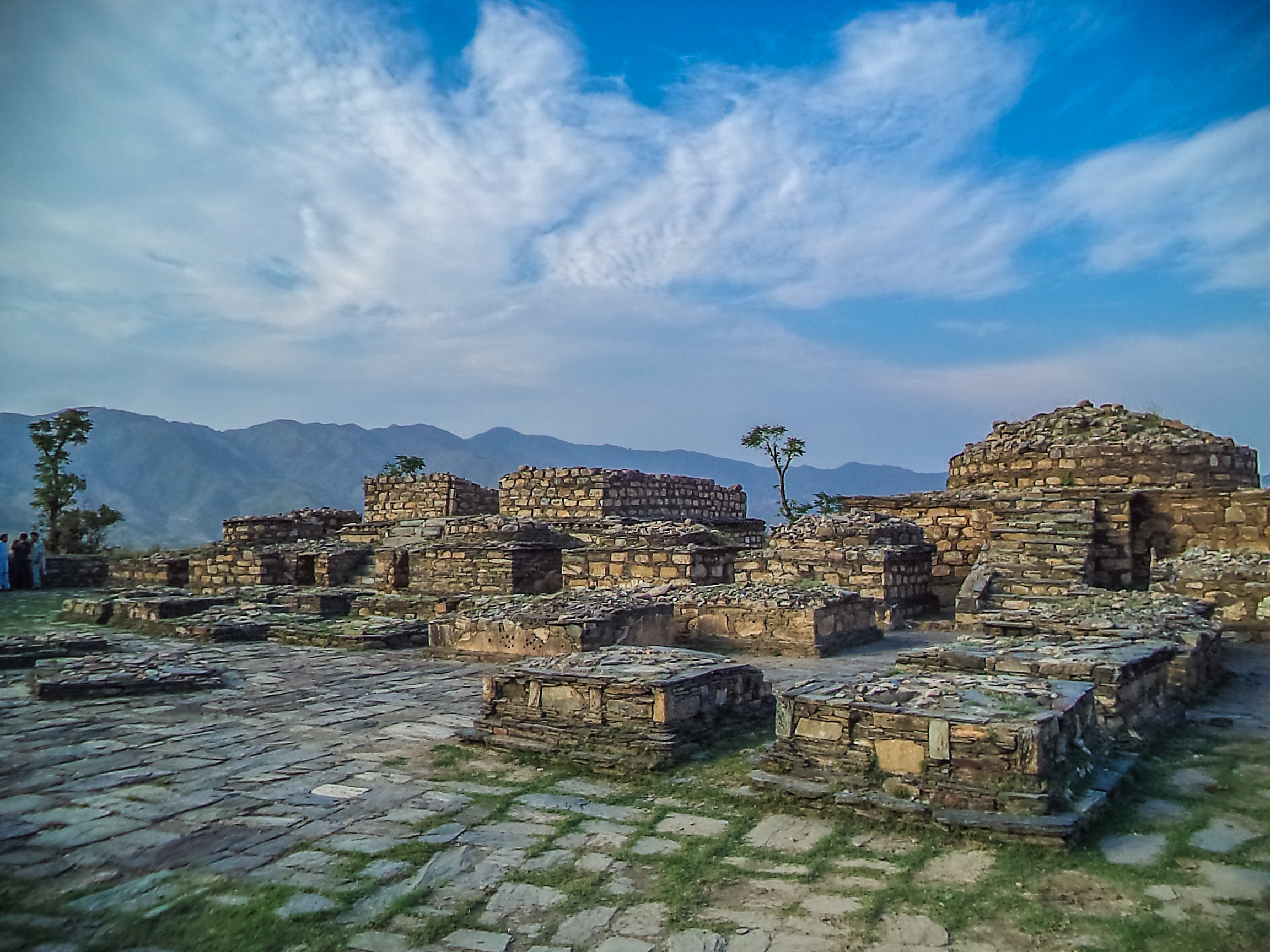

Location
- Location: Swat Valley
- Country: Pakistan
- Interactive map of Nemogram Stupa
- Coordinates: 34.7252°N 72.135°E

Nemogram stupa is located 45 km west of Saidu Sharif and 22 km from Birkot, on the right bank of Swat river in Pakistan.This site was discovered in 1966 and excavated in 1967–68. Swat (the former Uddiyana Kingdom) is rich in historical landmarks as well as natural beauty. In every direction, these are tangled in the wide valley. Aurel Stein, a British archaeologist, and Giuseppe Tucci, who was followed by other Italians, worked tirelessly to document and preserve these monuments.

There are three main stupas in row from north to south and 56 smaller stupas. There is also a monastery on the west of the main stupas. The stupas are believed to have been built in 2-3 century AD based on the discovery of coins from Kushana period. Apart from the coins and pottery of Scytho-Parthian period, a large number of stone, stucco sculptures depict various scenes of Buddhist mythology are present near the stupa. These sculptures are on display in Swat Museum. There are a large number of stone carvings and sculptures signifying the Buddhist Mythology.
