= Falak Sar =

Mountain in Hindu Kush Range, Pakistan

Falak Sar فلک سر
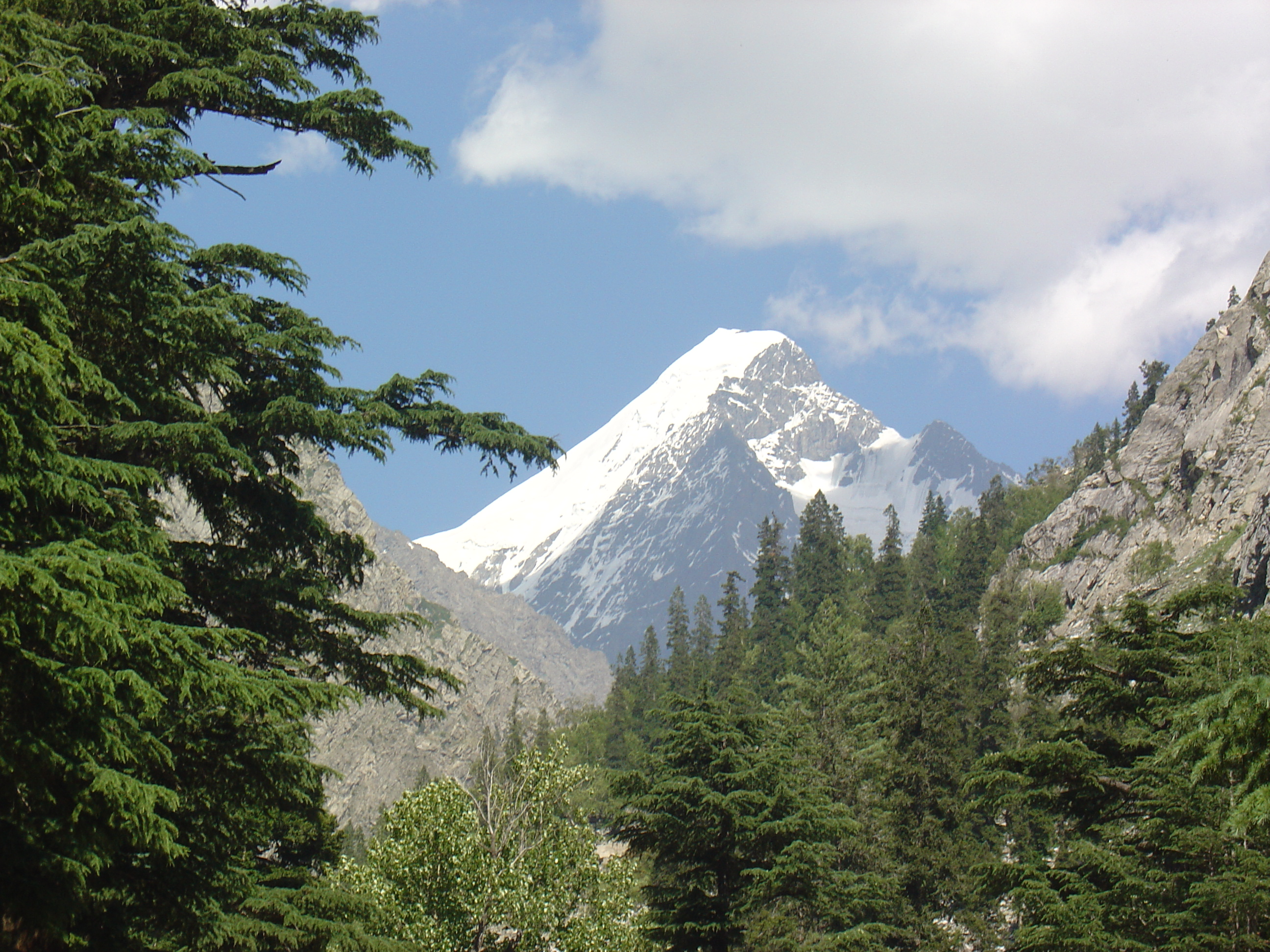
- Falak Sar, summer 2006

Highest point
- Elevation: 5,918 m (19,416 ft)
- Prominence: 1,558 m (5,112 ft)
- Listing: Ultra
- Coordinates: 35°40′58″N 72°47′07″E

Geography
- Location within Khyber Pakhtunkhwa Location within Pakistan
- Location: Swat Valley, Pakistan
- Parent range: Hindu Kush

Climbing
- First ascent: 1957 by Berry and Tyndale-Biscoe, New Zealand

Falak Sar (Urdu: فلک سر) is a 5,918 metres (19,416 ft) high mountain peak located in the Hindu Kush Range at the junction of Swat Valley and Kandia Valley in Pakistan. It is the highest mountain peak in Swat Valley, followed by Mankial Sar.

== Ascent history ==
Falak Sar is located at the border of Swat Valley and Kandia Valley in Kohistan, Pakistan. This mountain was climbed for the first time by W.K.A Berry and Cecil Hugh Tyndale-Biscoe of New Zealand in 1957 from its north ridge. The second ascent was made by Dr. Wolf Gang Stephen who also climbed Distaghil Sar and Malika Parbat.

Another ascent was made by a Japanese expedition from Yamaguchi University composed of Yoshiyuki Nagahiro and Toshiyuki Akiyama. After traveling by car from Peshawar through Saidu Sharif, capital of Swat, to Matiltan, they continued on and headed up the Falak Sar Valley, where at 11,000 feet on August 15 they established base camp. On August 20 they climbed Falak Sar (19,416 feet), which has had numerous previous ascents. After returning to Matiltan, they went through Kalam to the Amagal Valley to an advanced base at 12,000 feet. They ascended the east side above their advanced base and reached a small peak which was called Miangul Sar by the natives. They found no Miangul Sar (19,554 feet) but there was a peak called Par (c. 18,000 feet).

On August 17, 2020, Hamza Anees along with his team members Ahmed Mujtaba and Adnan Saleem became the first Pakistani to reach the summit of Falak Sar via the north ridge.

The first ski descent of Falak Sar was made from the summit by Bine Žalohar, Tom Grant and Aaron Rolph in June 2023. The international team were able to ski right from the summit, although they were forced to make three 50 m rappels on an ice field on the face.

== See also ==
- List of mountains in Pakistan
- List of ultras of the Karakoram and Hindu Kush
