= Mankial Sar =

Mountain in Pakistan

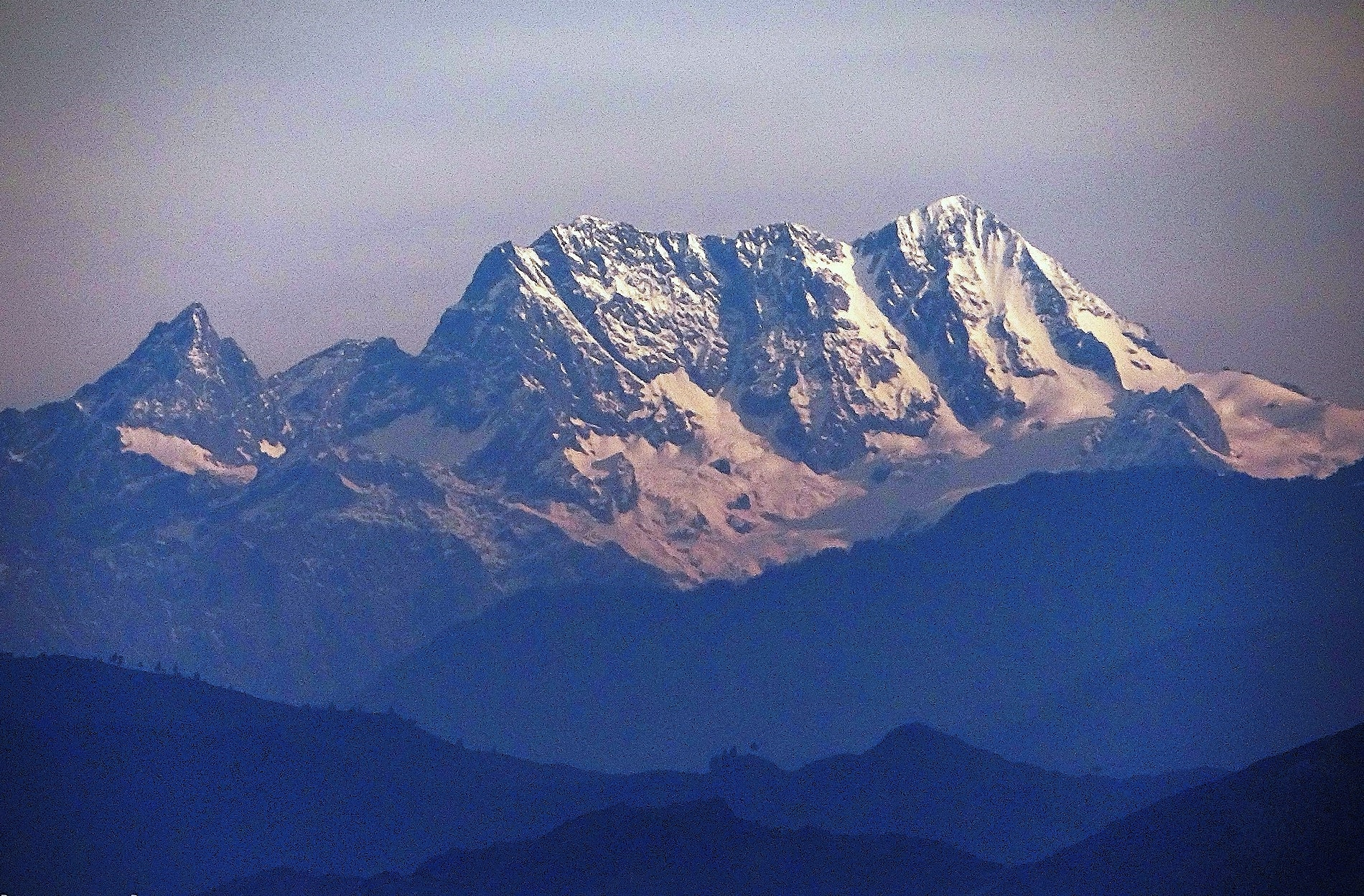
- South aspect

Highest point
- Elevation: 5,722 m (18,773 ft)
- Prominence: 1,357 m (4,452 ft)
- Coordinates: 35°25′03″N 72°43′09″E

Geography
- Location within Khyber Pakhtunkhwa Location within Pakistan
- Interactive map of Mankial Sar
- Country: Pakistan
- Province: Khyber Pakhtunkhwa
- District: Upper Swat District
- Parent range: Hindu Kush

Climbing
- First ascent: 1940

Mankial Sar, also known as Mankial Tsukai or Mankial Peak, is the second-highest peak in the Swat Valley of Pakistan, after Falak Sar.

== Description ==
Mankial Sar is a 5,722-metre (18,773-foot) glaciated summit in the Hindu Kush. The mountain is situated 80 kilometres (50 mi) north-northeast of Mingora. Precipitation runoff from this mountain's slopes drains west into the Swat River and east to the Indus River via the Kandia River. Topographic relief is significant as the north and south faces each rise 900 metres (2,952 ft) in one kilometre (0.62 mi), and the summit rises 3,920 metres (12,860 ft) above the Swat River in 11 kilometres (6.8 mi). The first ascent of the summit was made on June 28, 1940, by R. L. Holdsworth, John Martyn, Jack Gibson, and Rinsing (Sherpa porter). The fourth ascent in 1966 was beset by two fatalities: American J. R. MacArthur and German Ulrika Fürst.

== Climate ==
Based on the Köppen climate classification, Mankial Sar is located in a tundra climate zone with cold, snowy winters, and cool summers. This climate supports the Chuklelain Glacier on the southeast slope as well as several other unnamed glaciers surrounding the peak. Weather systems are forced upwards by the mountains (orographic lift), causing heavy precipitation in the form of rainfall and snowfall. July through mid-September is the monsoon season.

== Gallery ==
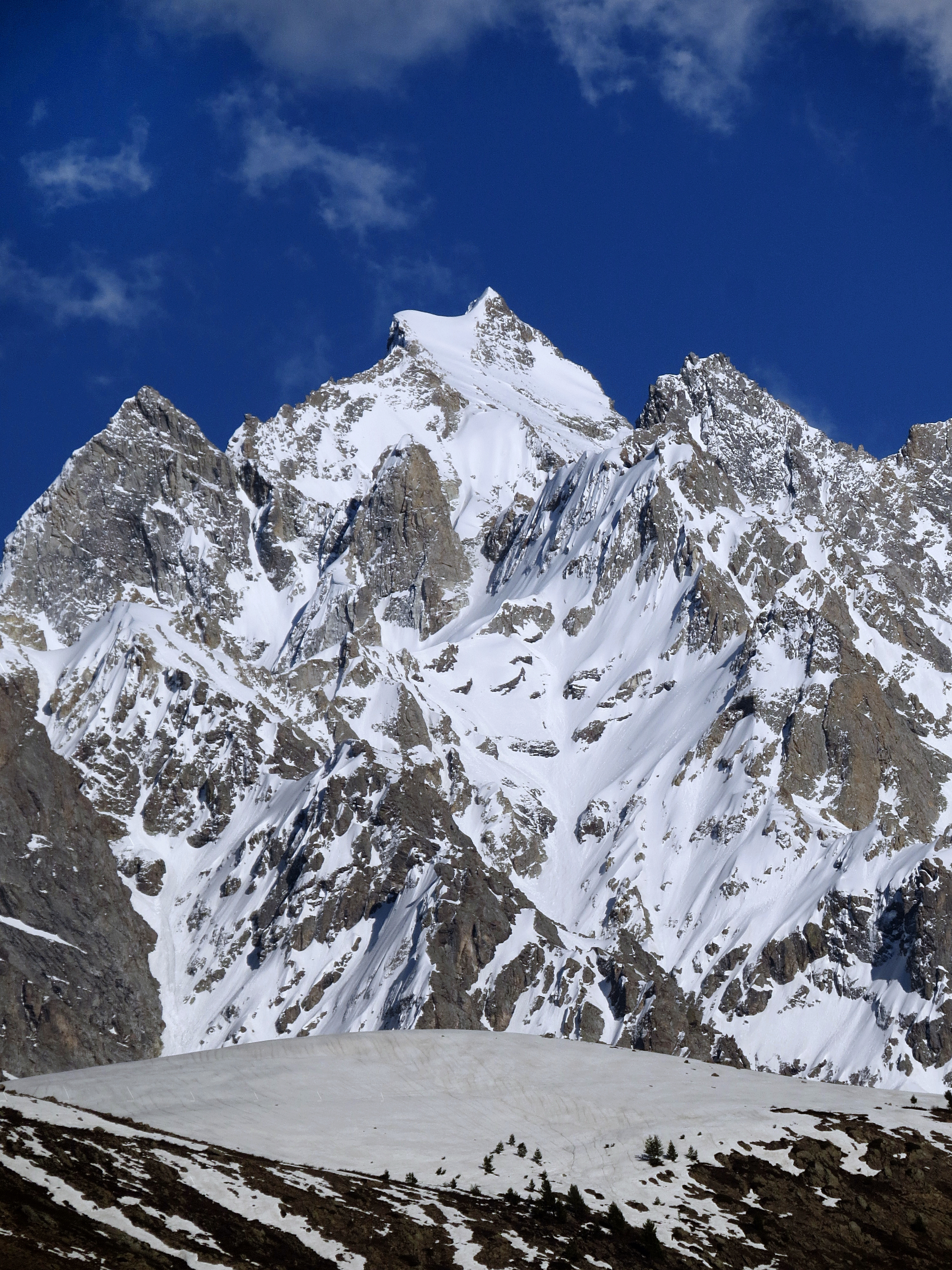
West aspect

== See also ==
- List of mountains in Pakistan
- Geography of Pakistan
