= Swat Valley =

Valley in Pakistan

- Switzerland of Pakistan
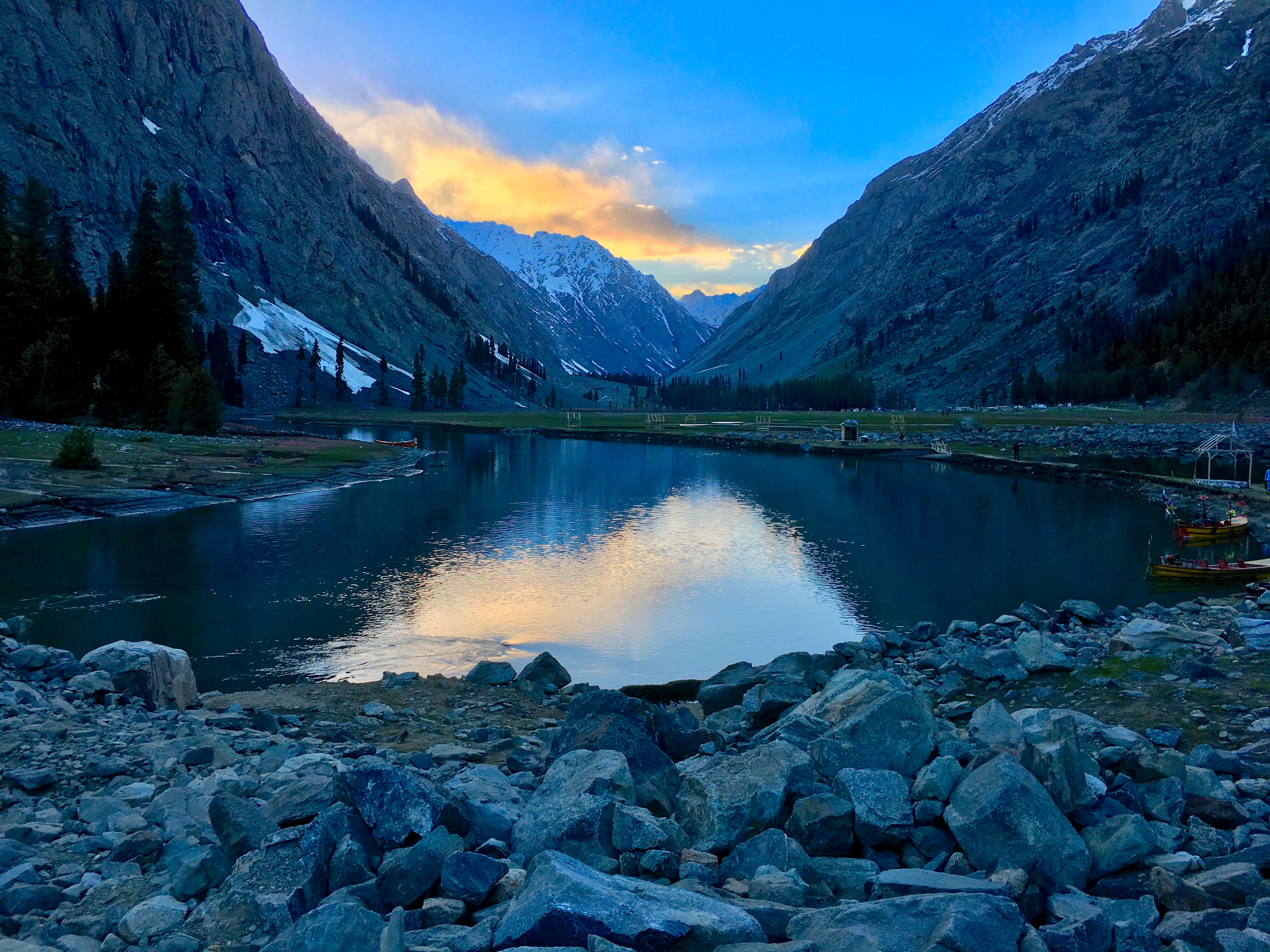
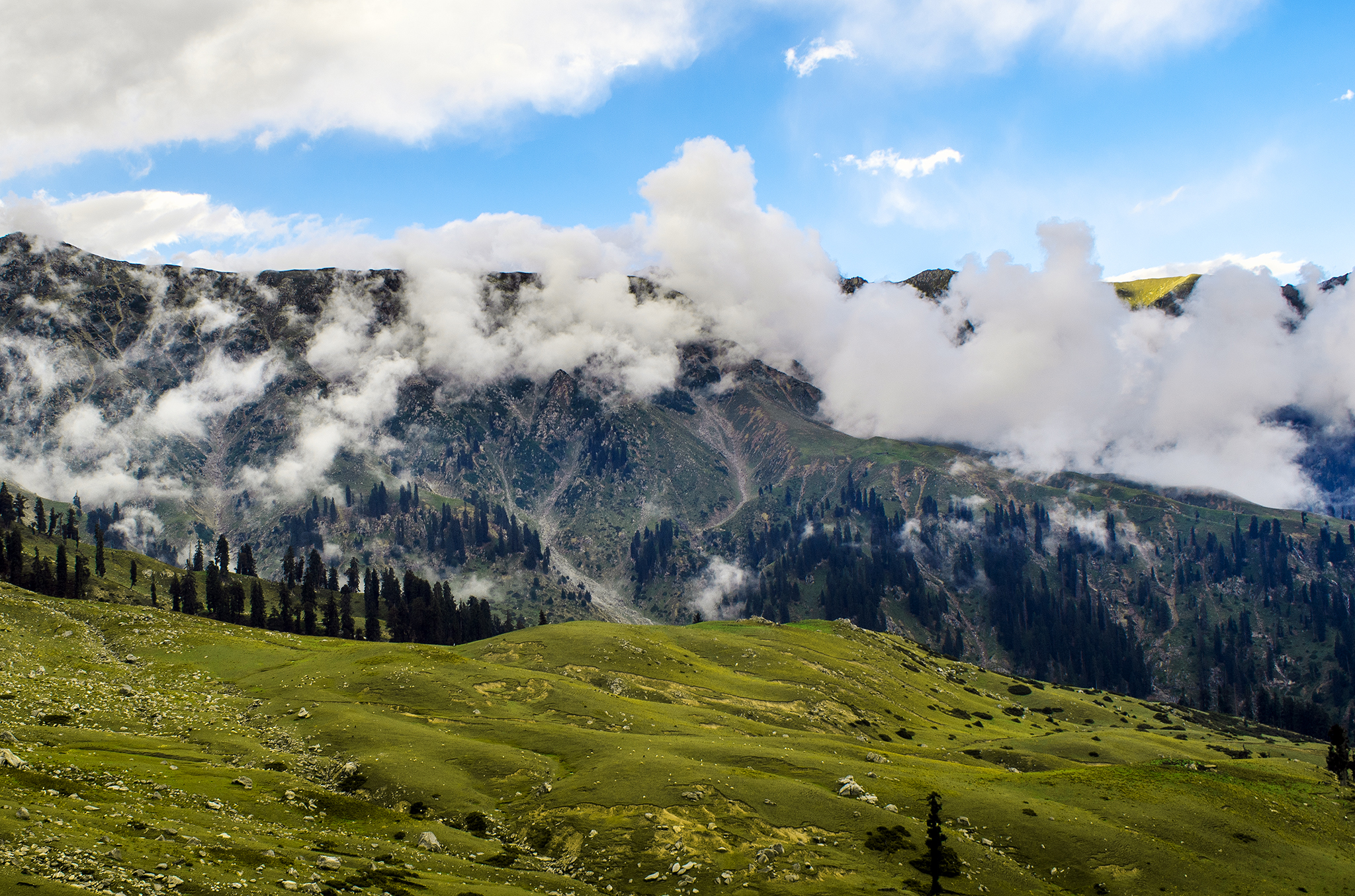
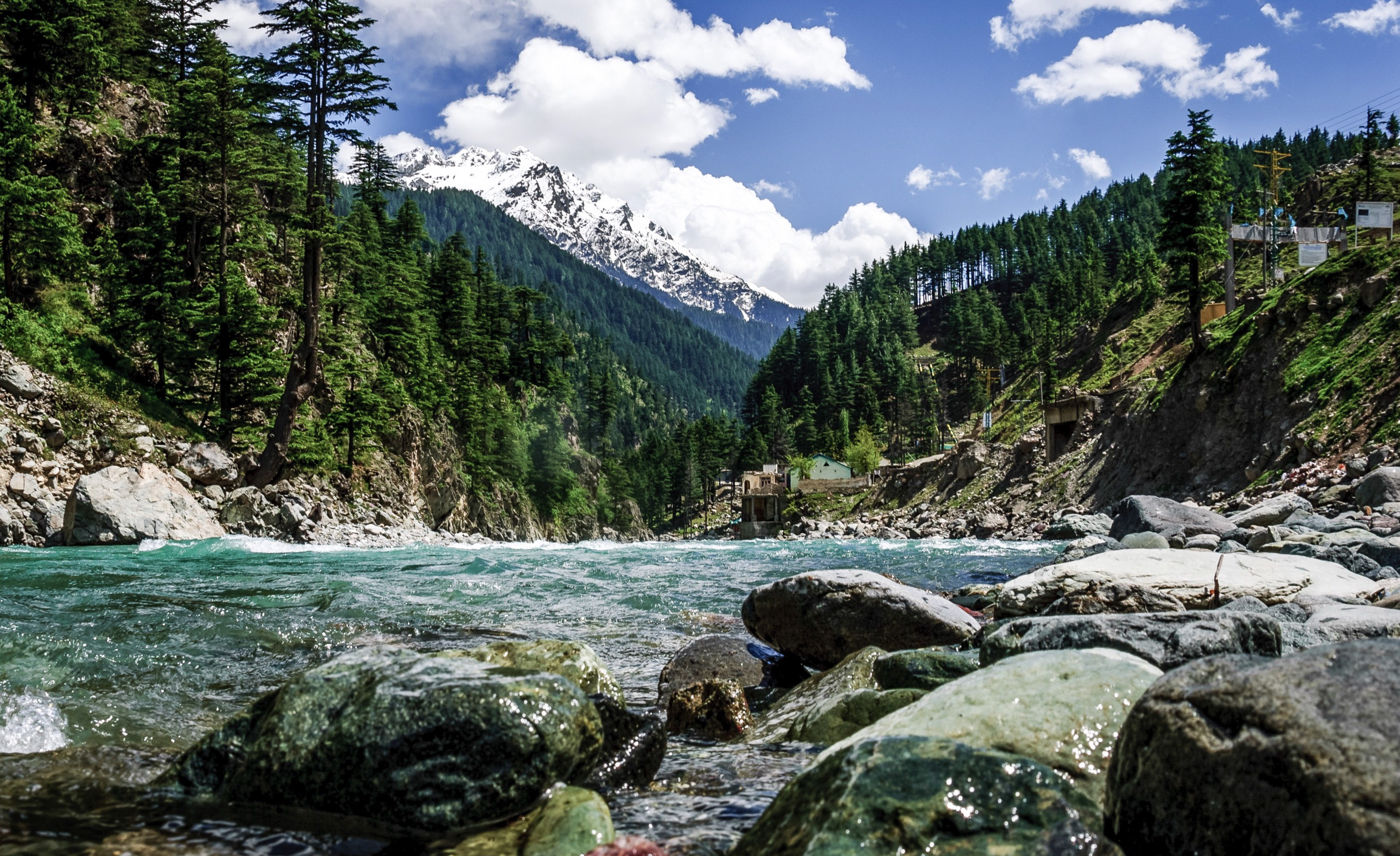
- Top: Mahodand Lake; Middle: Gabin Jabba; Bottom: Swat River

Geography
- Country: Pakistan
- State/Province: Khyber Pakhtunkhwa
- River: Swat
- Interactive map of Swat Valley

The Swat Valley is a mountainous valley located along the Swat River in northern Pakistan. Swat has an average elevation of 980 m (3,220 ft), and resultantly a considerably cooler and wetter climate compared to the rest of Pakistan. With lush forests, verdant alpine meadows, and snow-capped mountains, it is one of the most popular tourist destinations in the Khyber Pakhtunkhwa province and the country.

The early inhabitants of the valley were Indo-Aryans (also known as Daradas). The valley was a cradle of Swat culture in the second millennium BCE, and after the rise of Indo-Aryan Gandhāra civilization in the 6th century BCE, it became a major centre of early Buddhism, mainly the Gandhāran Buddhism. Swat is identified with Oḍḍiyāna in the Buddhist texts; a Buddhist dynasty known as Oḍirājas, which claimed descent from the Śākya clan of Buddha, ruled the valley in the first century CE. The Oḍi Śāhi dynasty was defeated by the Ghaznavids in the 11th century in Gandhāra, but the pockets of Buddhism persisted in the Swat Valley until the 16th century, with Tibetan monks such as Orgyan pa and Buddhaguptanātha continuing to visit it. In the early 16th-century, coinciding with the Babur's conquest of Delhi Sultanate, Swat was conquered by the Yousafzais, which saw the Pashtunization of Swat and the neighbouring areas. The older Dardic communities of Swat, Torwalis and Gawris were displaced to northern Swat.

In the early 19th century, Swat emerged as an independent state under Miangul dynasty, which descended from Saidu Baba. The State of Swat became a princely state under British suzerainty as part of the British Raj in 1918. In 1947, following the partition of Pakistan and India, Swat acceded to the Dominion of Pakistan. It continued as a self-governing princely state until it was officially annexed and merged into West Pakistan and later became a part of North-West Frontier Province (renamed as Khyber Pakhtunkhwa) in 1969. The region was seized by the Tehrik-i-Taliban in late-2007 but Pakistani control was re-established in mid-2009.

== Etymology ==
The name "Swat", of Sanskrit origin, is derived from the Swat River. The Swat River is referred to as the Suvāstu in the Sanskrit texts of Ṛgveda and in Aṣṭādhyāyī of Pāṇini, with a literal meaning "of fair dwellings". Another theory derives the word Swat from the Sanskrit word shveta (lit. 'white'), also used to describe the clear water of the Swat River. Some have suggested the Sanskrit name may mean "clear blue water." To the ancient Greeks, the river was known as the Soastus. The Chinese pilgrim Faxian referred to Swat as the Su-ho-to, while Xuanzang referred to it as Su-po-fa-su-to.

== Geography ==
Traditionally, Swat Valley is divided into two parts, Swat Kohistan, which is highly mountainous, and Swat Khas (Swat proper), which is itself divided into Koz Swat (lower Swat) and Bar Swat (upper Swat). Swat Kohistan commences from the origin of Swat River downstream until the village of Ain (also spelt Ayeen, آئین), or as per a slightly different division, until the village of Bahrain (بحرین). Upper Swat stretches from Ain/Bahrain until Landakay (لنڈاکے), while Lower Swat is situated between Landakay and Kalangai (کلنگئی), a few miles before the confluence Panjkora and Swat rivers. At the confluence of two rivers the average height of the valley is 2,000 feet (610 m), but northward it rises upto 22,000 feet (6,700 m) in Swat Kohistan. The total length of the valley is 130 miles (210 km) while the average breadth is 12 miles (19 km). Politically it is now divided among the districts of Upper Swat, Swat, Lower Dir and Malakand.

The Swat Valley is enclosed by mountains that form a natural geographic boundary for it. The Swat River, whose headwaters arise in the 5,500-to-5,800-metre-tall (18,000–19,000 ft) Hindu Kush mountain range runs through the length of the region. The main spine consists of many sub valleys such as Kalam, Bahrain, Matiltan, Utror, and Gabral. The highest peaks are Falak Sar, 5,918 m (19,416 ft), and Mankial Sar, 5,722 m (18,773 ft).

The Valley of Swat is delineated by natural geographic boundaries, and is centered on the Swat River. The valley is enclosed on all sides by mountains, and is intersected by glens and ravines. Above mountains ridges to the west is the Panjkora Valley, to the north the Gilgit Valley, and Indus River gorges to the east. To the south, across a series of low mountains, lies the wide Peshawar Valley.

The northernmost areas of Swat district are the high valleys and alpine meadows of Swat Kohistan (Swat Mountains), a region where numerous glaciers feed the Usho, and Gabral rivers (also known as the Utrar River), which form a confluence at Kalam, and thereafter form the Swat River, which forms the spine of the Swat Valley. Swat then is characterized by thick forests along the narrow gorges of the Kalam Valley until the city of Madyan. From there, the river courses gently for 160 km through the wider Yousafzai Plains of the lower Swat Valley until Chakdara.

=== Climate ===
Climate in Swat is a function of altitude, with mountains in the Kohistan region snow-clad year round. The upper areas of the region are relatively colder and often get snowfall in the winter. Drier, warmer temperatures in the lower portions in the Yousafzai Plains where summer temperatures can reach 105 °F (41 °C), although the lower plains experience occasional snow. Both regions are subject to two monsoon seasons: one in winter and the other in summer. Swat's lower reaches have vegetation characterized by dry bush and deciduous trees, while the upper areas mostly have thick pine forests.

== History ==
=== Ancient ===
The Gandhara grave culture that emerged c. 1400 BCE and lasted until 800 BCE, and named for their distinct funerary practices, was found along the Middle Swat River course. Swat, then known as Oddiyana, was a major centre of Gandhara civilization. The Gandhāra Kingdom, which emerged as an independent entity around 700 BCE, was recognized as a mahajanapada (Great Realm). Following the Achaemenid conquest of the Indus Valley, the region was incorporated as the satrapy of Gandāra. In 327 BCE, Alexander the Great fought his way to Odigram and Barikot and stormed their battlements; in Greek accounts, these towns are identified as Ora and Bazira, respectively. After the Alexandrian invasion of Swat, and adjacent regions of Buner, control of the wider Gandhara region was claimed by Seleucus I Nicator.

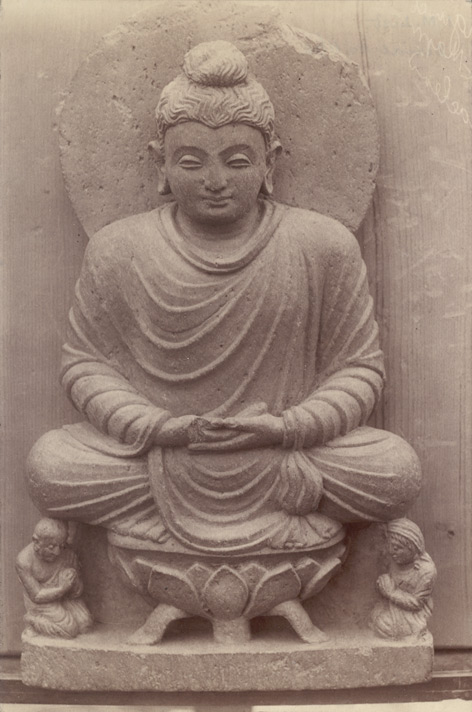
1896 photo of a Buddha statue seated on a lotus throne in Swat

In 305 BCE, the Mauryan emperor Chandragupta conquered the wider region from the Greeks, and probably established control of Swat, until their control of the region ceased around 187 BCE. It was during the rule of the Mauryan emperor Ashoka that Buddhism was introduced into Swat, and some of the earliest stupas built in the region. Following collapse of Mauryan rule, Swat came under control of the Greco-Bactrians, then the Indo-Scythians from the Central Asian Steppe.

The region of Gandhara (based in the Peshawar valley and the adjacent hilly regions of Swat, Buner, Dir, and Bajaur), broke away from Greco-Bactrian rule as the Indo-Greek Kingdom. Following the death of the most famous Indo-Greek king, Menander I around 140 BCE, the region was overrun by the Indo-Scythians, and then the Persian Parthian Empire around 50 CE. The arrival of the Parthians began the long tradition of Greco-Buddhist art.

The Parthians were ousted from Swat by the Kushans, based in the Peshawar Valley. Kushan rule began what is considered by many to be the golden age of Gandhara. Under the greatest Kushan king, Kanishka, Swat became an important region for the production of Buddhist art, and numerous Buddhists shrines were built in the area. As a patron of Mahayana Buddhism, new Buddhists stupas were built and old ones were enlarged. The Chinese pilgrim Fa-Hsien, who visited the valley around 403 CE, mentions 500 monasteries.

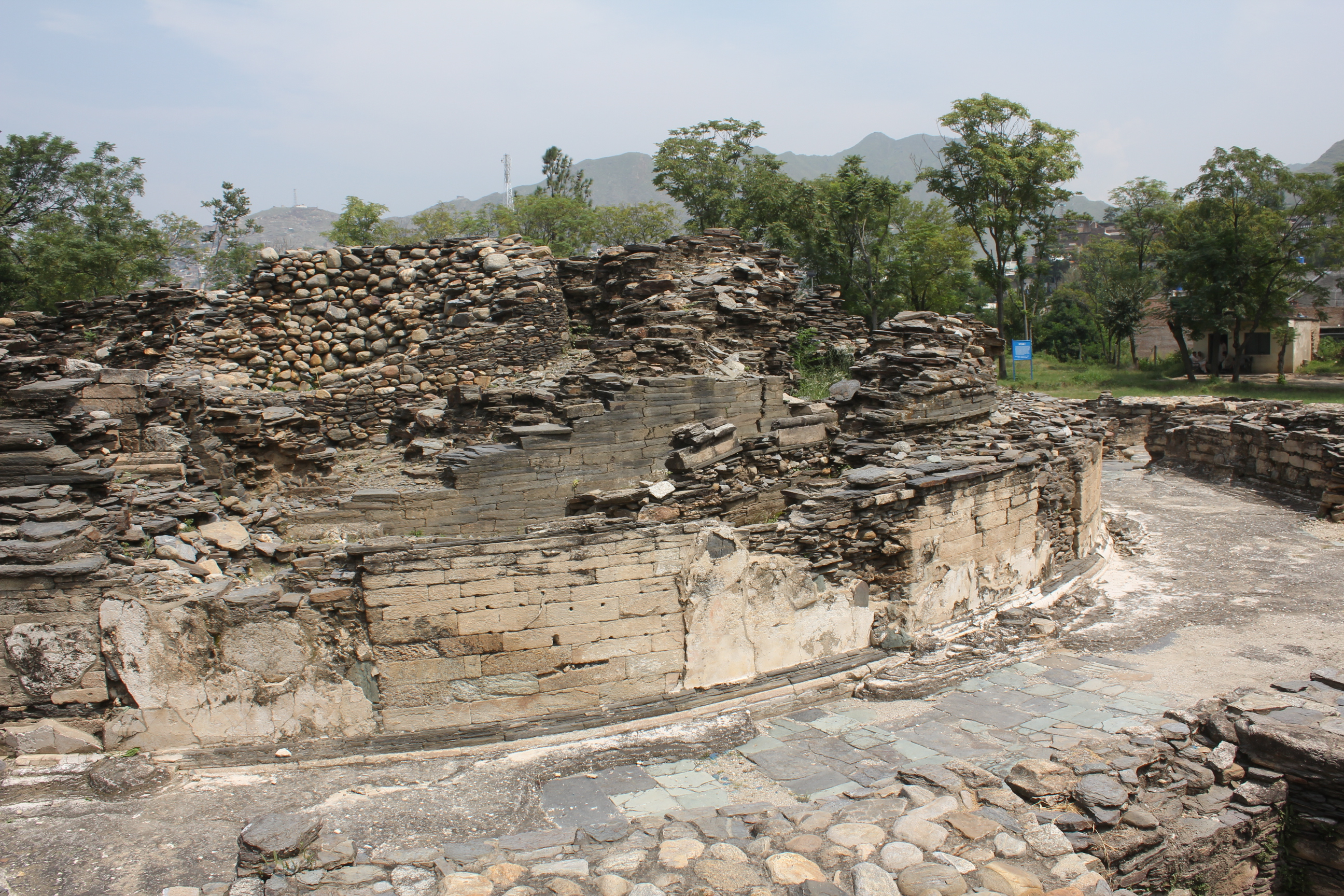
Butkara Stupa may have first been built during Mauryan rule in the 2nd century BCE.

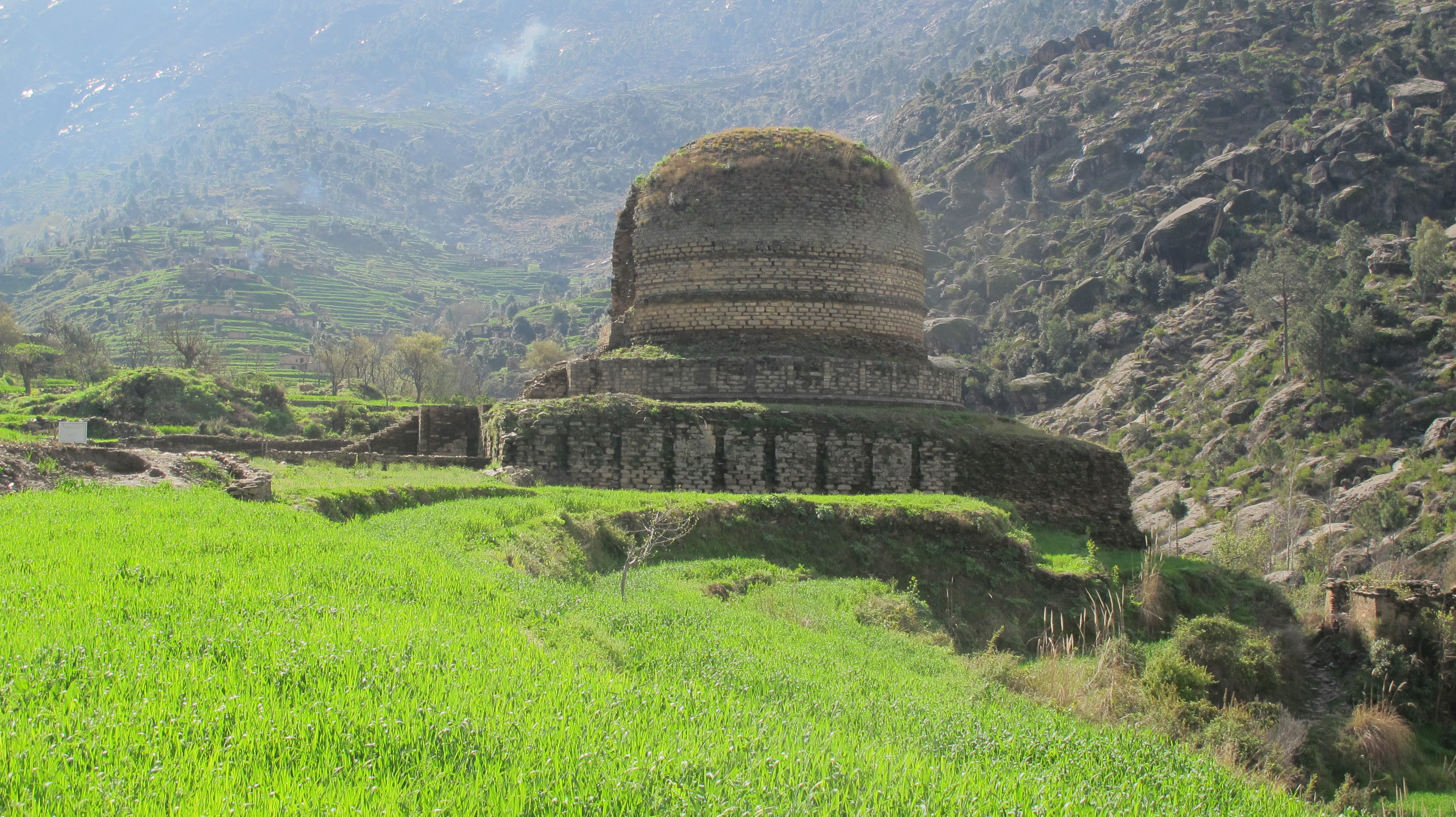
Amlukdara Stupa was built around the 3rd century CE, and is one of many Buddhist ruins in Swat.

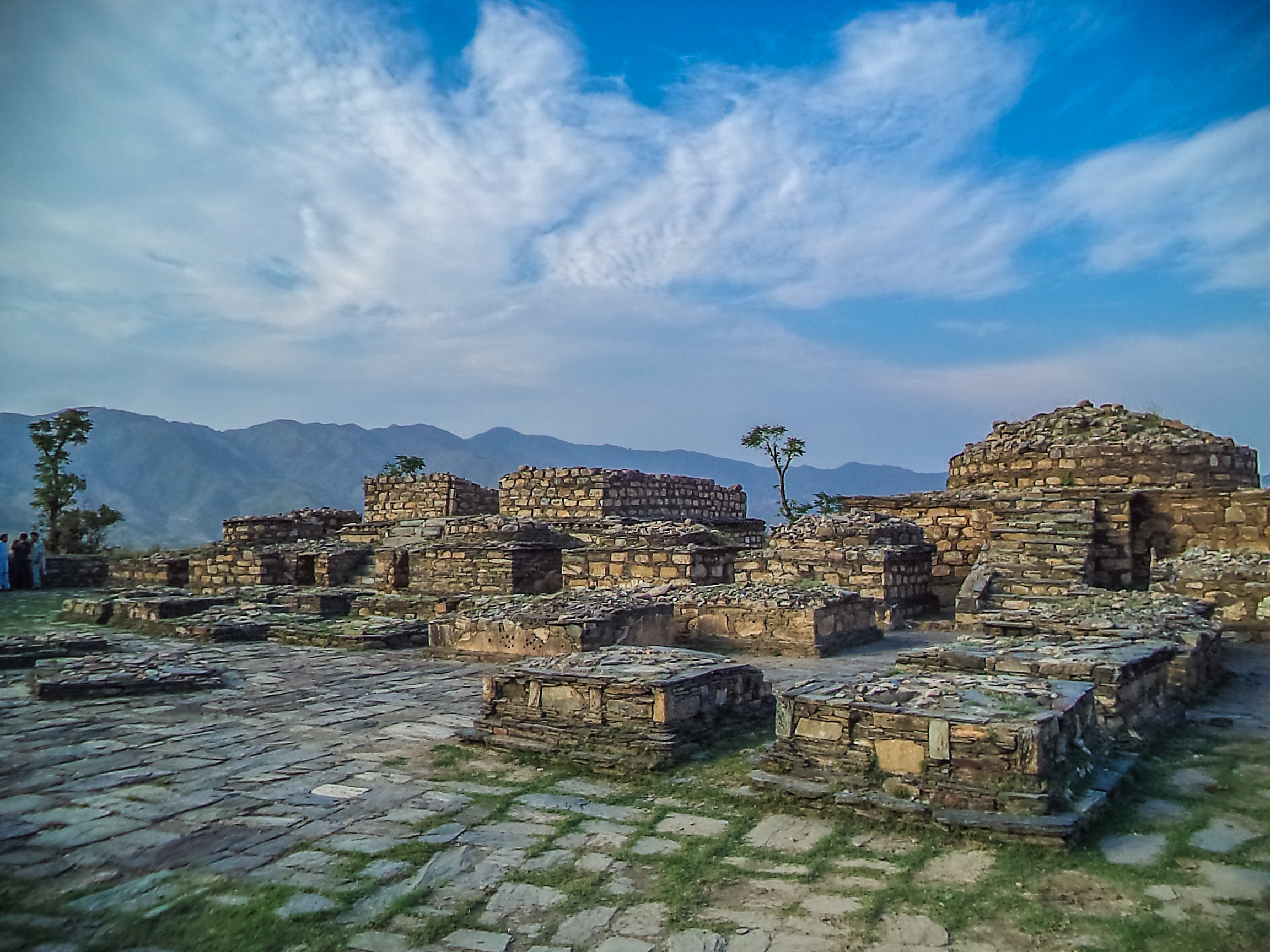
Nemogram Stupa, dating from the Kushan period c. 2-3 centuries CE, with many of its statues on display at the Swat Museum

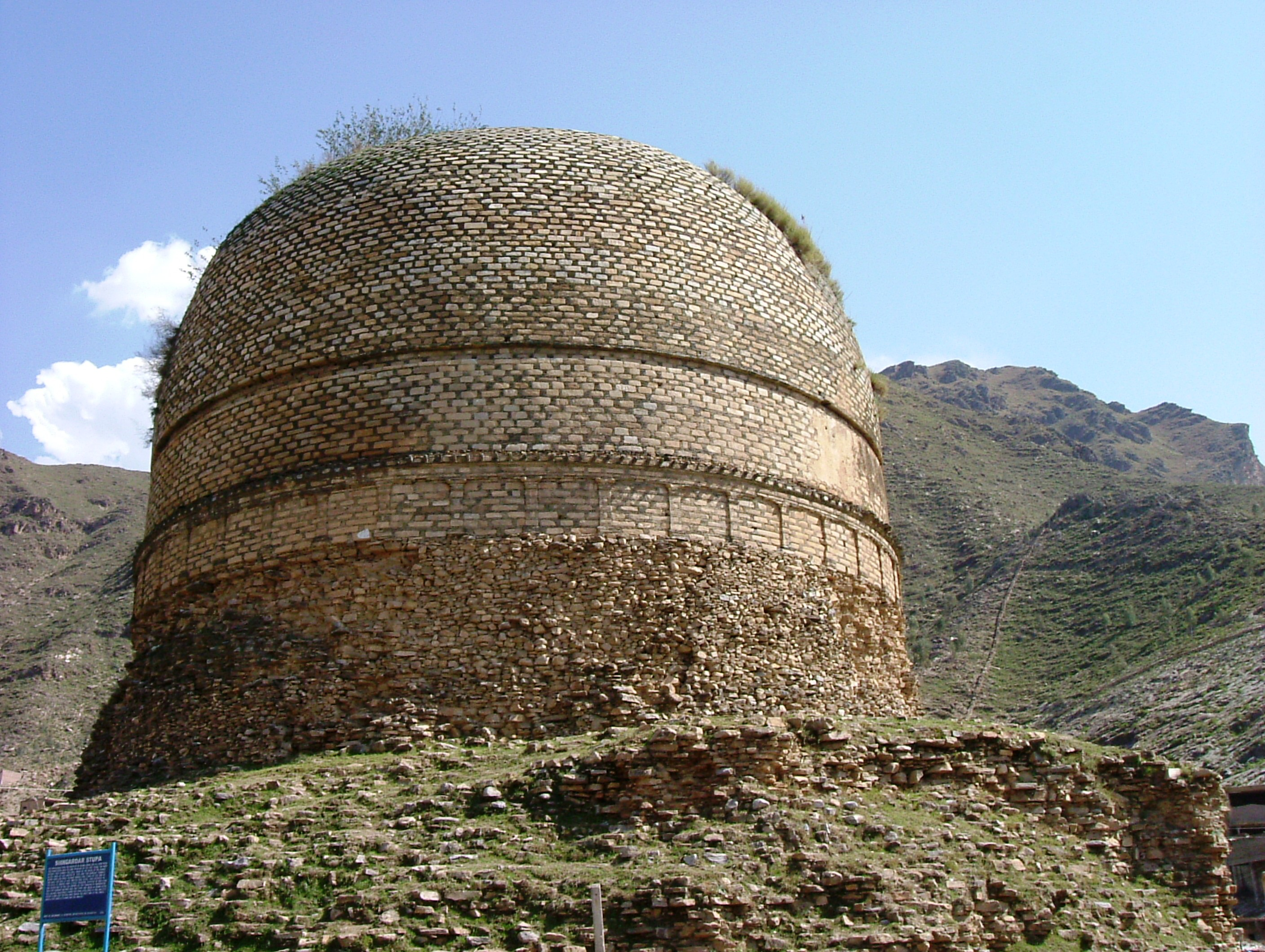
Shingardar Stupa, a 27-metre tall stupa built along the main road that enters Swat from the Peshawar Valley

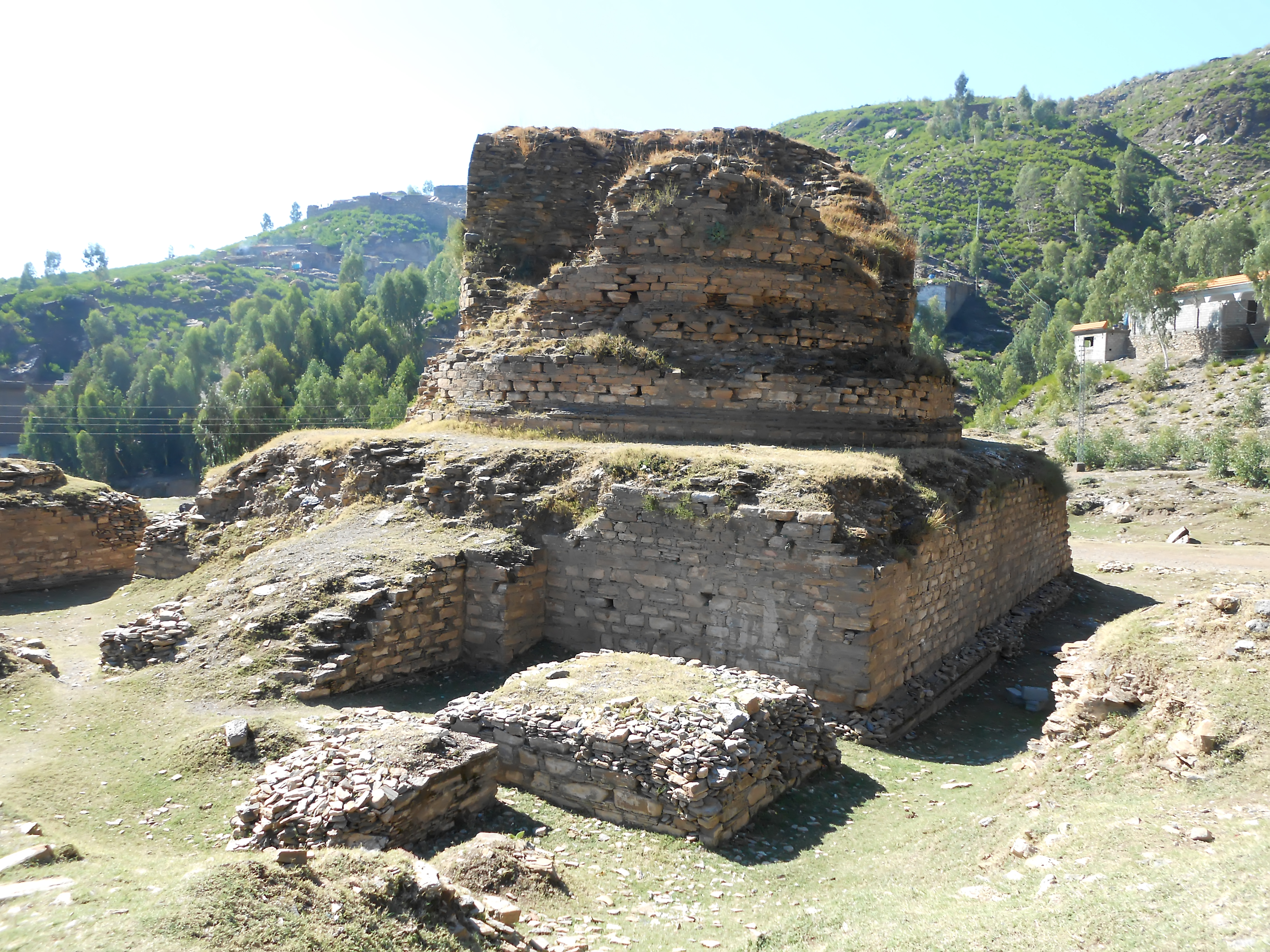
Shamozi Stupa

=== Medieval ===
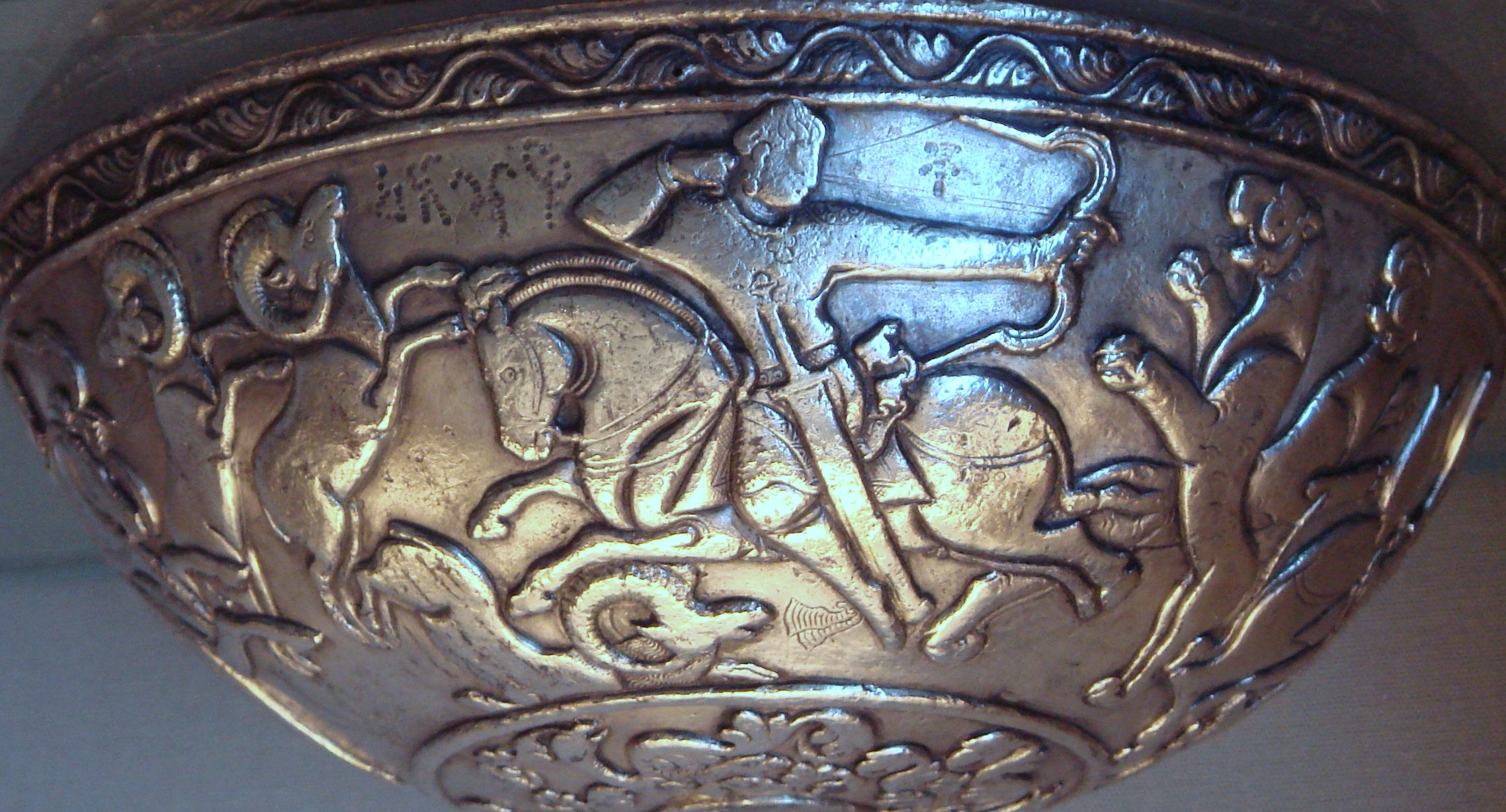
The Hephthalite bowl from Swat (5th century AD) features two Kidarite royal hunters as well as two Alchon hunters, suggesting a period of peaceful coexistence between the two entities.

Swat and the wider region of Gandhara were overrun by the Alchon Huns around about 465 CE. Under the rule of Mihirakula, Buddhism was suppressed as he himself became virulently anti-Buddhist after a perceived slight against him by a Buddhist monk. Under his rule, Buddhist monks were reportedly killed, and Buddhist shrines attacked. He himself appears to have been inclined towards the Shaivism sect of Hinduism.

In around 520 CE, the Chinese monk Song Yun visited the area, and recorded that area had been in ruin and ruled by a leader that did not practice the laws of the Buddha. The Tang-era Chinese monk Xuanzang recorded the decline of Buddhism in the region, and ascendance of Hinduism in the region. According to him, of the 1400 monasteries that had supposedly been there, most were in ruins or had been abandoned.

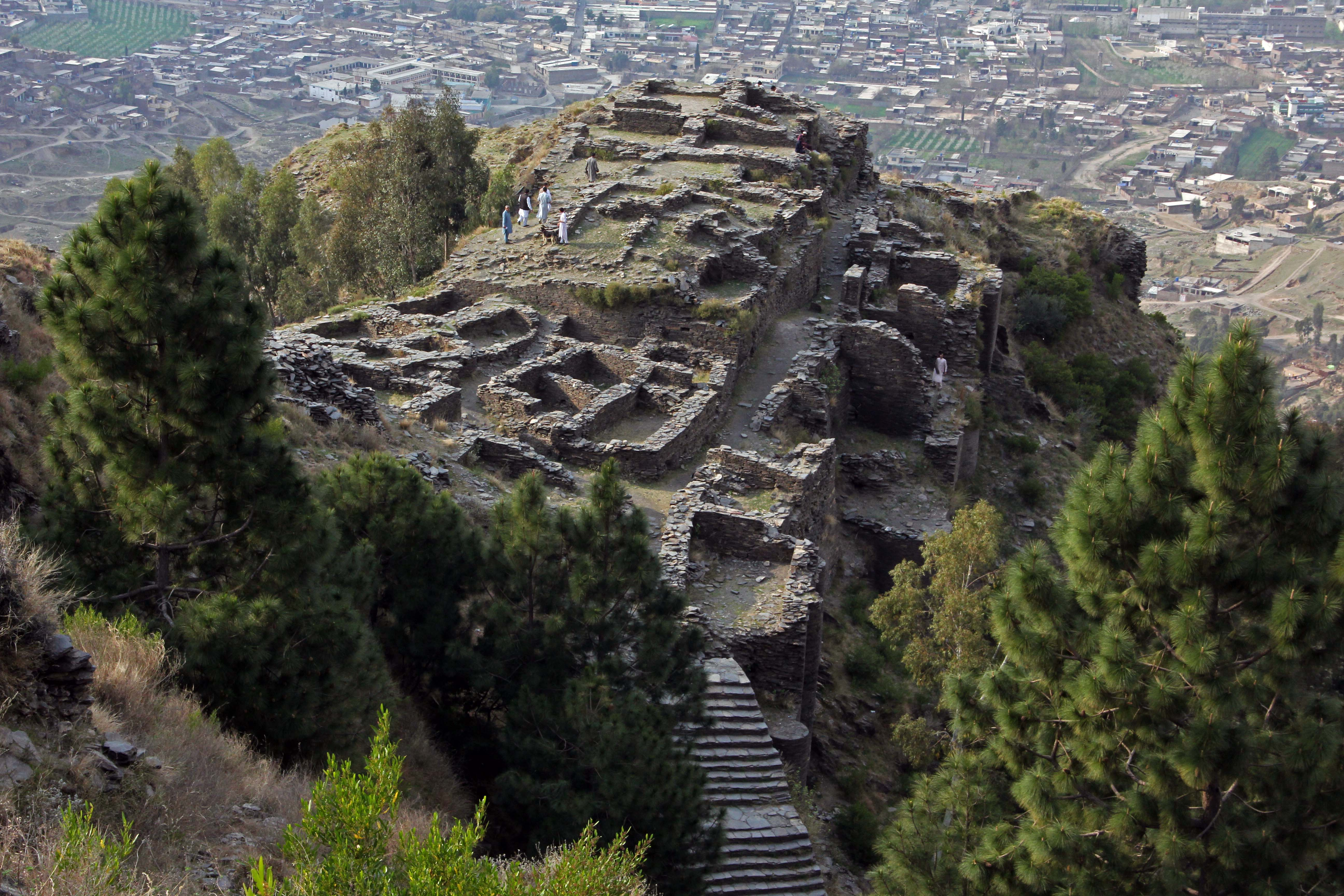
Raja Gira was the site of a fortress from which the Hindu Shahis ruled Swat.

Following the collapse of Buddhism in Swat after the Alchon Hun invasion, Swat was ruled by the Hindu Shahi dynasty beginning in the 8th century, who made their capital at Udigram in lower Swat. The Hindu Shahis are believed to belong to the Uḍi/Oḍi tribe, namely the people of Oddiyana, present-day Swat.

The Shahis built an extensive array of temples and other architectural buildings, of which ruins remain today. Under their rule, Hinduism ascended, and Sanskrit is believed to have been the lingua franca of the locals during this time. By the time of the Muslim conquests (c. 1000 CE), the population in the region was predominantly Hindu, though Buddhism persisting in the valley until the 10th century, after which the area became largely Muslim. Hindu Shahi rulers built fortresses to guard and tax the commerce through this area, and ruins dating back to their rule can be seen on the hills at the southern entrance of Swat, at the Malakand Pass.

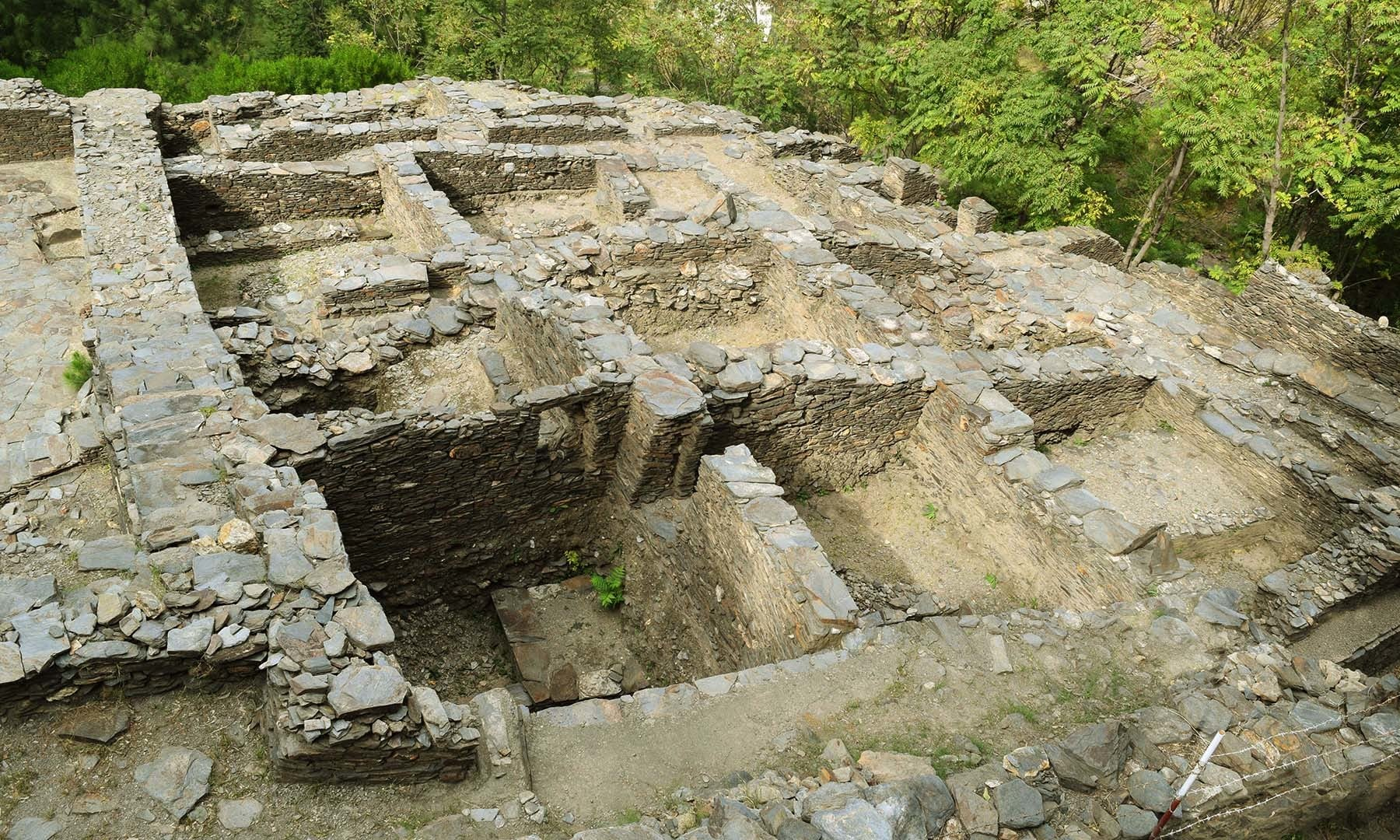
The Mahmud Ghaznavi Mosque was built in the former Hindu Shahi capital of Odigram shortly after their defeat, and dates to 1048–49 CE.

Around 1001 CE, the last major Hindu Shahi king, Jayapala was decisively defeated at the Battle of Peshawar by Mahmud of Ghazni, thereby ending 2 centuries of Hindu rule over Gandhara. The Sultanate of Swat was the last Dardic state that existed in the Swat valley between 12th and 16th centuries. It was conquered by the Yousafzai Pashtuns from west during the reign of Sultan Awes Jahangiri in 1519, resulting into the Pashtunization of Swat.

=== Modern ===
The princely state of Swat was a kingdom established in the late 19th century by the descendants of the Muslim saint Akhund Abdul Gaffur, more commonly known as Saidu Baba, that was ruled by chiefs known as Akhunds. It was then recognized as a princely state in alliance with the British Indian Empire between 1926 and 1947, after which the Akhwand acceded to the newly independent state of Pakistan. Swat continued to exist as an autonomous region until it was dissolved in 1969, and incorporated into Khyber Pakhtunkhwa Province (formerly called NWFP).

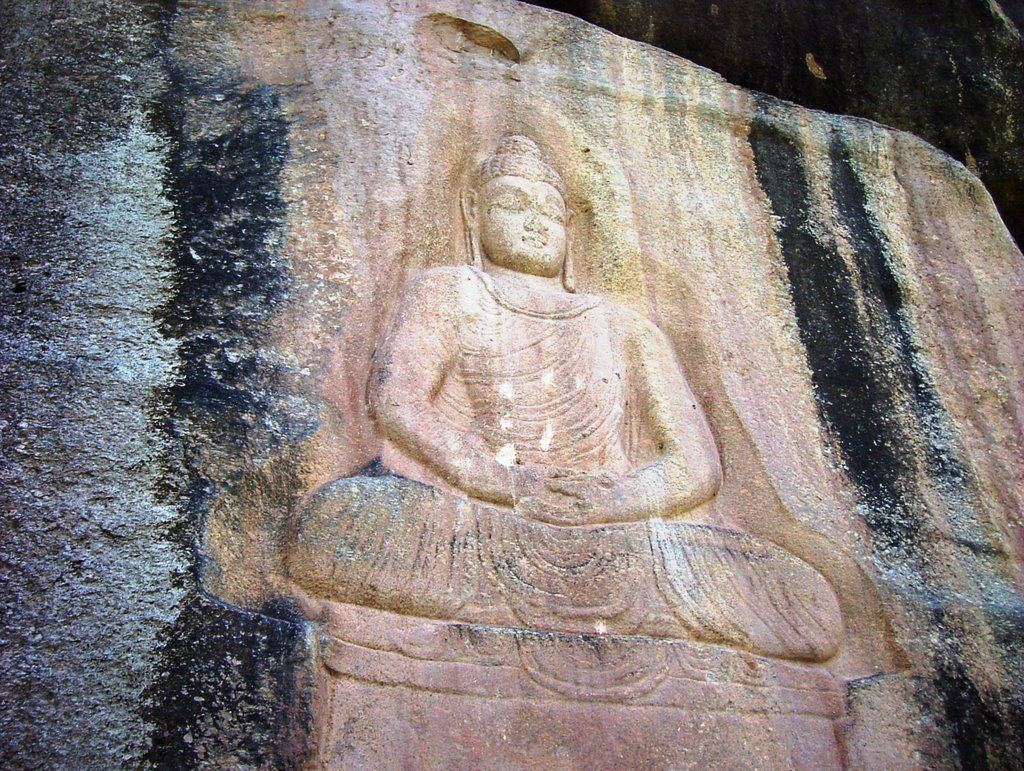
The Buddhist rock carvings of Manglawar were damaged by the Tehreek-i-Taliban, but restored with Italian aid.

The region was seized by the Pakistani Taliban in late-2007, and its highly-popular tourist industry was subsequently decimated until Pakistani control was re-established in mid-2009 after a month-long military campaign launched by the Pakistan Army. During their occupation, the group attacked Nobel laureate Malala Yousafzai in 2012, who at the time was a young school-girl who wrote a blog for BBC Urdu detailing life under Tehreek-i-Taliban rule, and their curb on girls' education.

Kushan-era Buddhist stupas and statues in the Swat Valley were demolished by the Tehreek-i-Taliban, and the Jehanabad Buddha's face was blown up using dynamite, but was repaired by a group of Italian restorers in a nine-year-long process. Looters subsequently destroyed many of Pakistan's Buddhist artifacts, and deliberately targeted Gandhara Buddhist relics for destruction. Gandhara artifacts remaining from the demolitions were thereafter plundered by thieves and smugglers.

== Demographics ==
=== Social groups ===
Main ethnic groups in the Swat Valley are:

- Gujar
- Pashtuns
- Torwali
- Gawri

=== Language ===
Main spoken languages are Pashto, Torwali, Gawri, and Gujari. During the medieval era, the now extinct Gibri and Yadri languages were also widely spoken in the region.

== Gallery ==
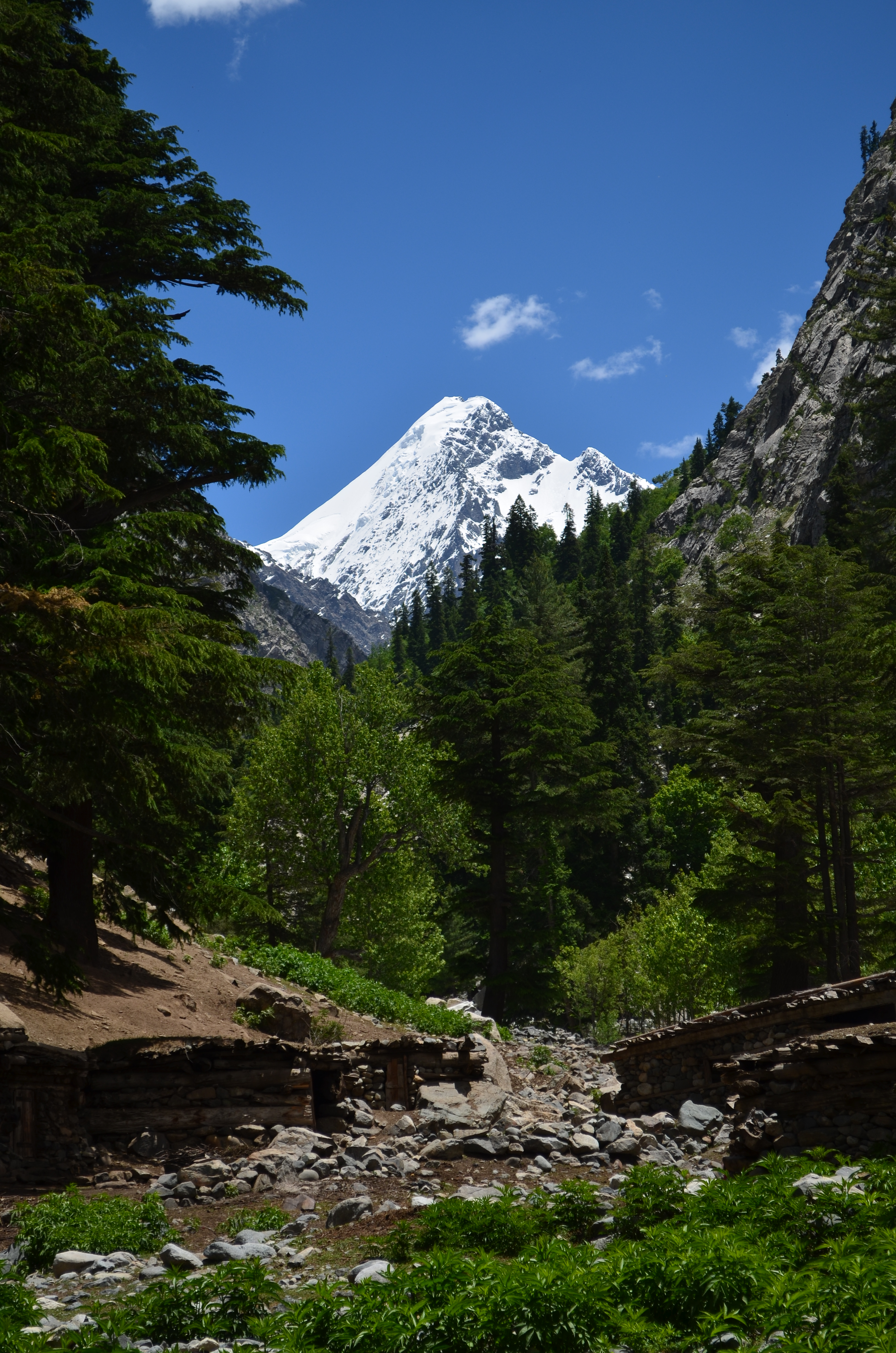
Falak Sar, Swat's tallest mountain at 5,957 metres (19,544 ft)

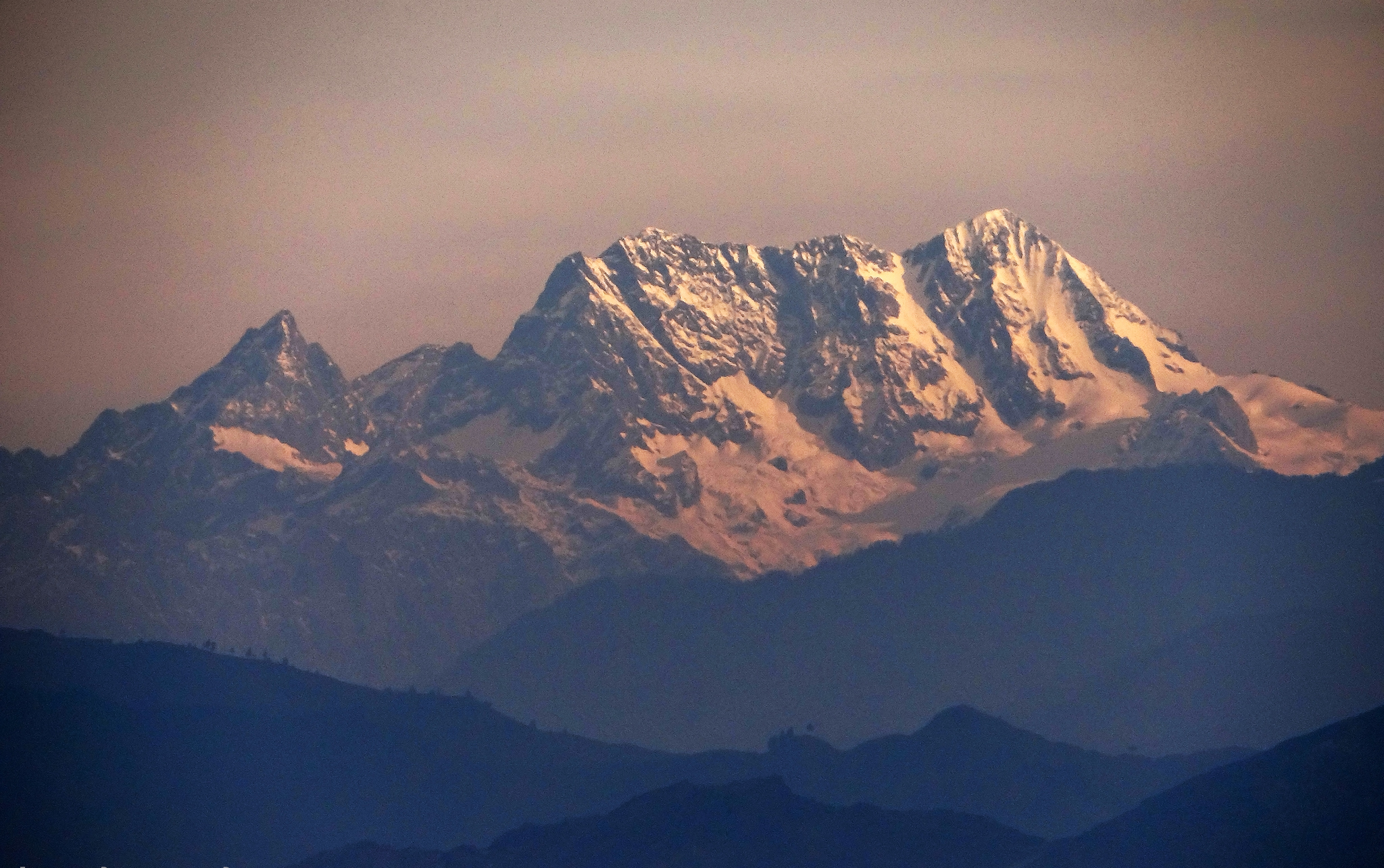
Mankial Sar, which rises to 5,700 m (18,600 ft)

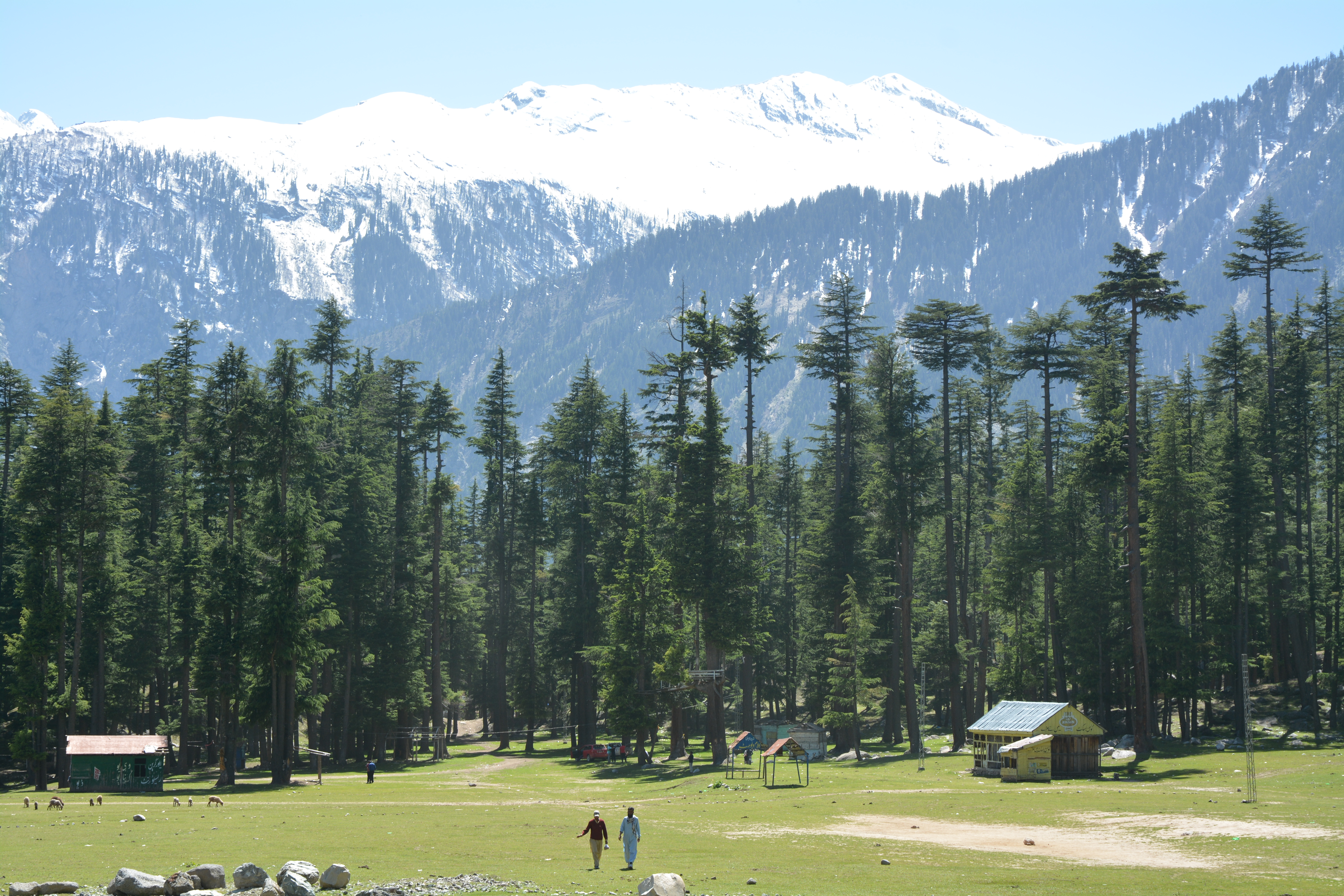
Pine forests occur in Swat at elevations over 1,500 m (5,000 ft)

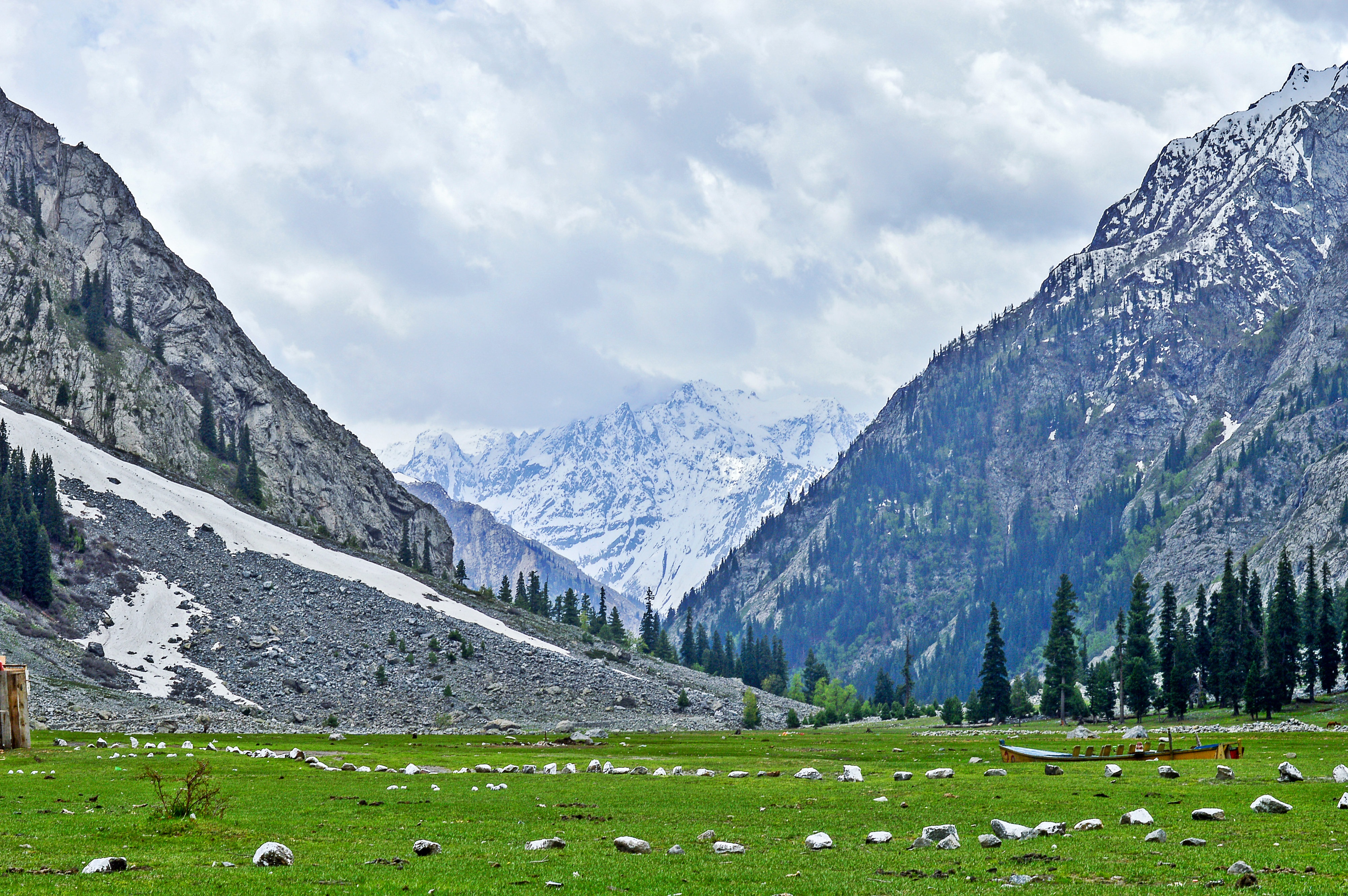
The northernmost region of Swat – a region known as Kohistan – has high alpine valley at the base of tall mountains

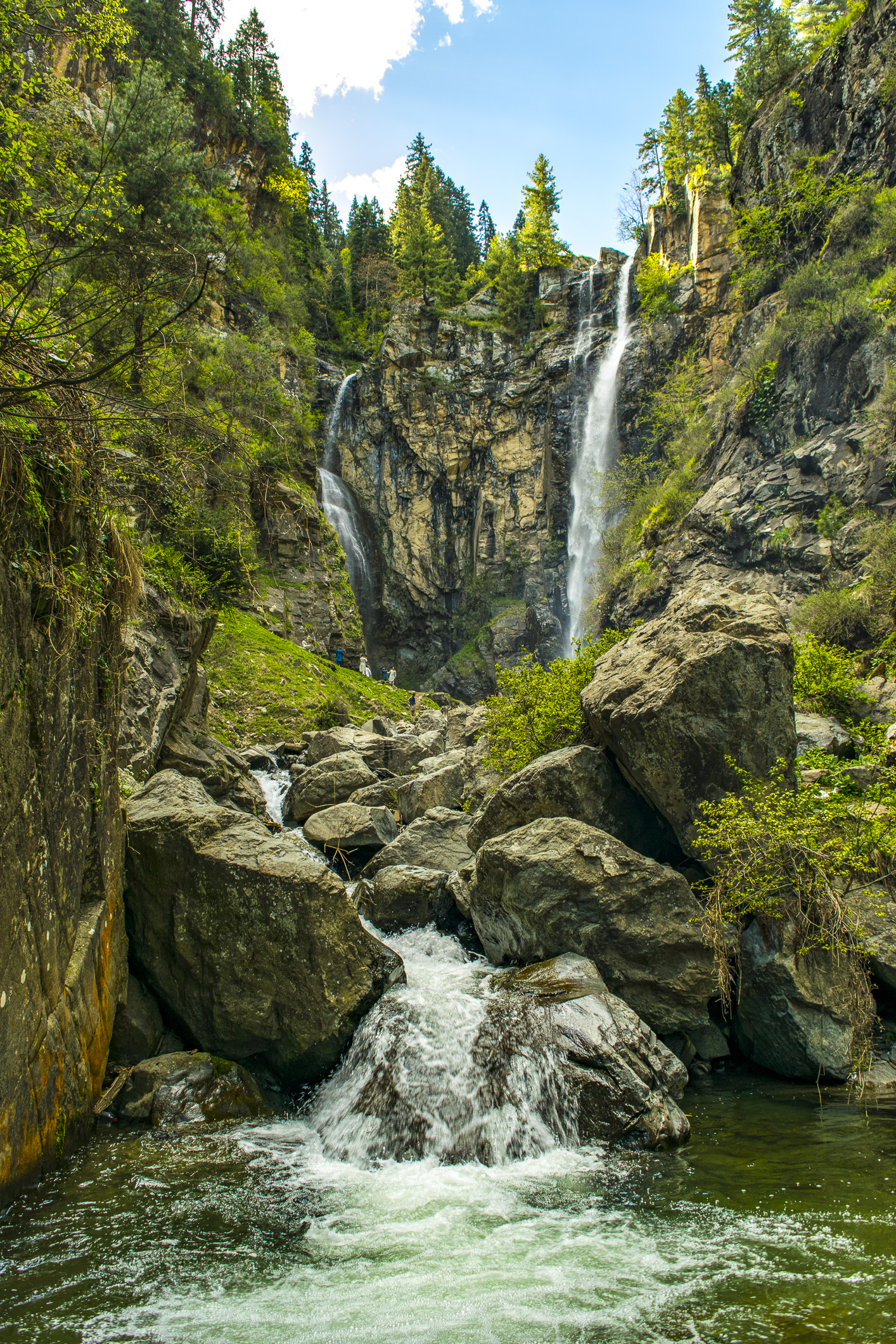
Jarogo Waterfall, in middle Swat

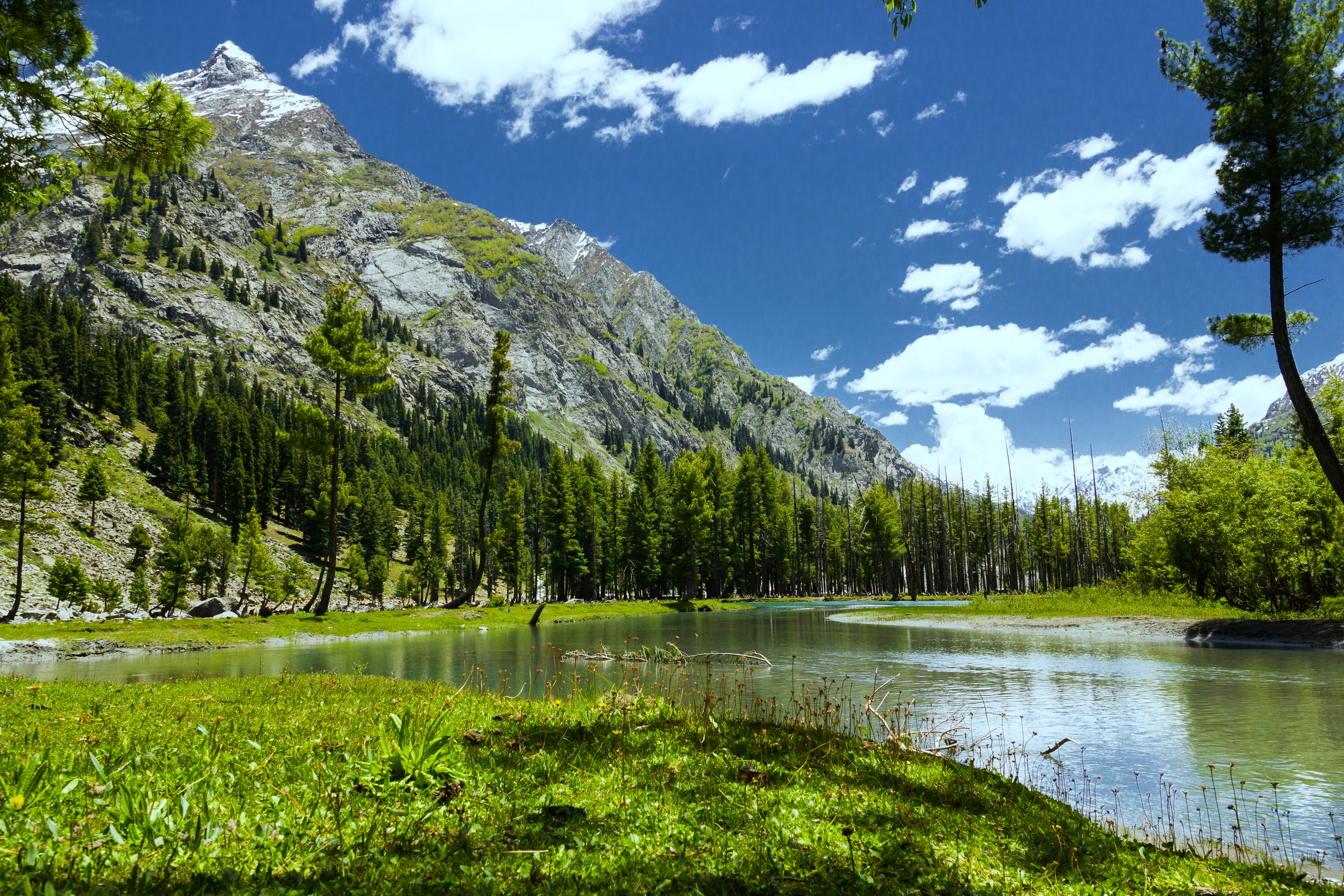
Alpine lakes, such as Mahodand Lake are found in the mountains of Swat Kohistan.

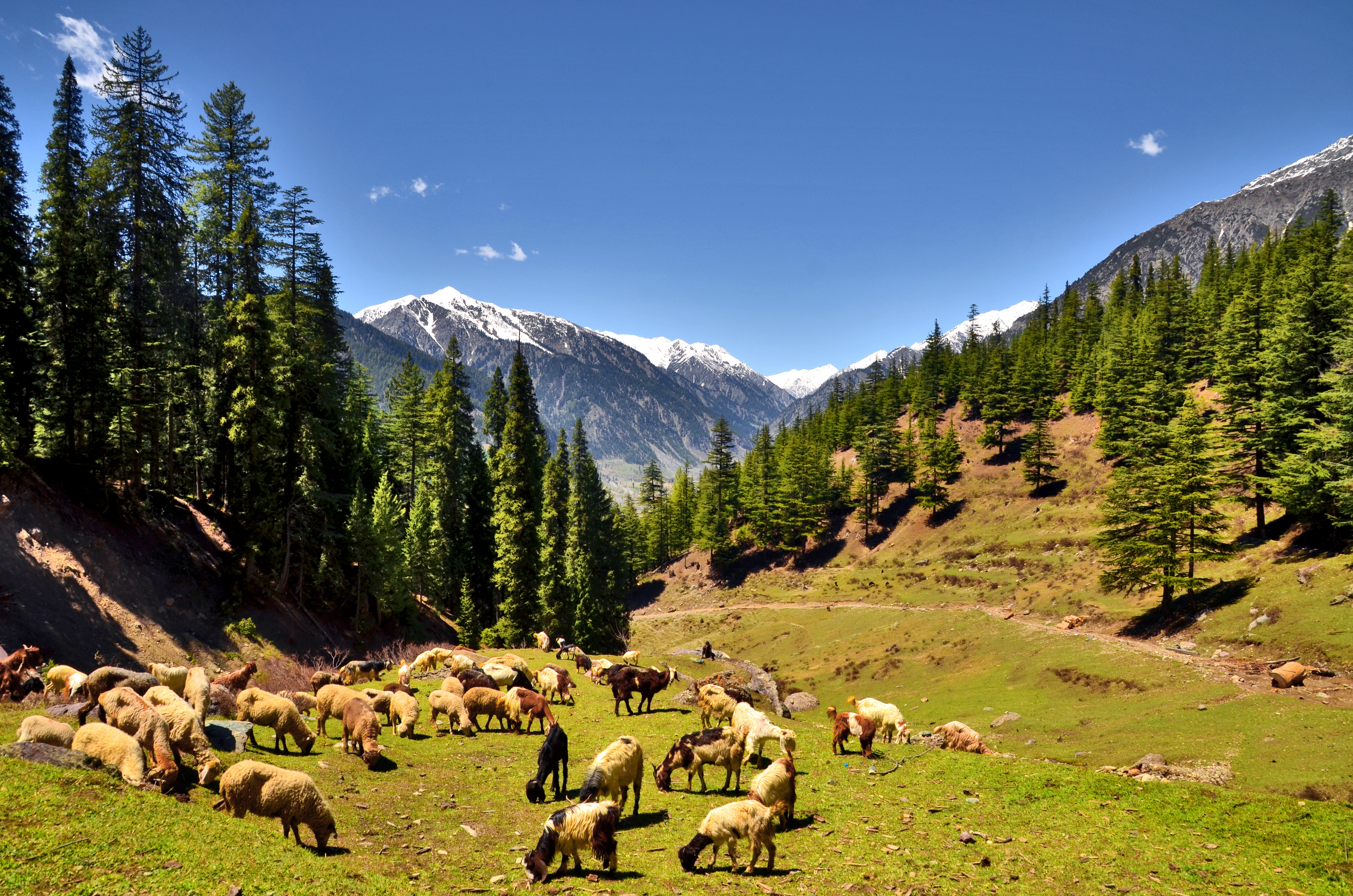
Alpine meadows in Utror

== Bibliography ==
- Alram, Michael (2014). "From the Sasanians to the Huns New Numismatic Evidence from the Hindu Kush". The Numismatic Chronicle. 174: 261–291. JSTOR 44710198.
